= Rowdy (2014 soundtrack) =

2014 soundtrack album and film score by Sai Karthik

Soundtrack album by Sai Karthik
- Released: 20 March 2014
- Recorded: 2013
- Genre: Soundtrack
- Length: 20:27
- Language: Telugu
- Label: Puri Sangeet
- Producer: Sai Karthik

Sai Karthik chronology
Paisa (2013)	Rowdy (2014)	Nuvvala Nenila (2014)

Rowdy is the soundtrack album to the 2014 film of the same name directed by Ram Gopal Varma and starring Mohan Babu, Vishnu Manchu and Shanvi Srivastava. The film's soundtrack and original score were composed by Sai Karthik and lyrics written by Kasarla Shyam. The background score was considered to be influenced by Ilaiyaraaja's music for Varma's debut film Siva (1989) and was dedicated as the tribute to the veteran composer. The music was released under the Puri Sangeet label on 20 March 2014 at Tirupati, while a separate score album was released nine days later.

== Development and production ==
Sai Karthik composed the music and the background score for the film, in his first collaboration with Varma. The songs were written by Kasarla Shyam, were performed by Karthik, Shweta Mohan, Divija Karthik, Srikanth, Sai Charan, Sampath, Aditya, Hymath, Rajesh, Bindu, Aparna, Damini, Mounima, along with Sai Karthik himself.

Varma had been a fan of background scores and considered Ilaiyaraaja's music piece for the cycle chase sequence in Siva as his all-time favorite, adding that he could not "forget the goose bumps [he] got back in 1989 when Ilaiyaraaja was scoring music for that sequence". Having been admired Ilaiyaraaja's works, he was interested in bringing back the composition to express "the great idea of the genius Ilaiyaraaja's 1989 soundtrack (of Siva) to 2014". Hence, he asked Karthik to integrate the cycle chase theme as the film's main theme and it worked well. The film's background score was also dedicated as a tribute to the veteran musician.

== Marketing and release ==
In mid-March 2014, it was announced that the film's music launch will be held at Tirupati. A one-minute song teaser of the romantic number "Nee Meeda Ottu" was released on 12 March 2014. The film's soundtrack was launched at the Sree Vidyanikethan Engineering College in Tirupati, with the cast and crew in attendance. Afterwards, the video songs of "Nee Meeda Ottu" and "Rowdy Song" were premiered at the VMax Multiplex theater and Mallikarjuna theatre, respectively.

== Track listing ==
All lyrics are written by Kasarla Shyam.

No.	Title	Artist(s)	Length
1.	"Ammorini Minchina"	Sai Karthik	03:54
2.	"Nee Meeda Ottu"	Karthik, Swetha Mohan	03:55
3.	"Rowdy Song"	Sai Karthik, Sai Charan, Sampath, Aditya	02:51
4.	"O Bullemma"	Srikanth, Divija Karthik	03:12
5.	"Mangalyam"	Srikanth	03:42
6.	"Anna Theme"	Sai Charan, Hymath, Rajesh, Bindu, Aparna, Damini, Mounima	02:53
Total length:			20:27

== Background score ==
Rowdy

Film score by Sai Karthik
- Released: 29 March 2014
- Recorded: 2013
- Genre: Film score
- Length: 48:54
- Label: 24 Frames Factory
- Producer: Sai Karthik

The film's background score was released on 29 March 2014 as a jukebox format on the 24 Frames Factory YouTube channel and other social networking sites. The score album was not released in any other audio formats.

No.	Title	Length
1.	"Krishna Intro"	3:40
2.	"Anna Intro"	2:39
3.	"Gurva Reddy Meeting"	5:15
4.	"Villain Intro"	1:03
5.	"Bhushan Intro"	1:36
6.	"Dining Table"	2:11
7.	"Vedham Gives Gyan to Bhushan"	1:31
8.	"SP Intro"	1:22
9.	"Anna and Krishna Have a Talk"	2:02
10.	"Anna Meets Bhushan"	1:43
11.	"Anna Repents"	1:18
12.	"Lakshmi Convinces Anna"	5:45
13.	"Attack on Anna"	1:21
14.	"Ananda Rao's Intro"	3:49
15.	"Gogin Rao Come to Hospital"	0:59
16.	"Second Attempt on Anna"	2:57
17.	"Attack on Krishna and Sirisha"	3:52
18.	"Psyching Bhushan"	5:04
19.	"Anna and Krishna Discuss"	0:47
Total length:		48:54

== Reception ==
A reviewer based at The Times of India wrote "Rowdy is an album that's high on energy and emotions. Sai Karthik's interesting compositions are racy and intense." Sangeetha Devi Dundoo of The Hindu wrote "The background score (Sai Karthik) suddenly gets louder with a liberal chant of mantras and at other times mellows down and subtly complements the drama." Priyak Mitra of Deccan Chronicle noted that "the re-recording is very good and the music is okay".
