= Current Theega =

- Theatrical release poster
- Directed by: G. Nageswara Reddy
- Screenplay by: G. Nageswara Reddy
- Story by: Ponram
- Based on: Varuthapadatha Valibar Sangam (Tamil)
- Produced by: Manchu Vishnu
- Starring: Manchu Manoj; Rakul Preet Singh; Jagapathi Babu
- Cinematography: Satish Mutyala
- Edited by: M. S. Rajashekhar Reddy (S. R. Shekhar)
- Music by: Achu
- Production company: 24 Frames Factory
- Distributed by: 24 Frames Factory
- Release date: 31 October 2014 (India)
- Running time: 128 minutes
- Country: India
- Language: Telugu

Current Theega (transl. Electrical wire) is a 2014 Indian Telugu-language romantic comedy action film produced by Manchu Vishnu on 24 Frames Factory banner and directed by G. Nageswara Reddy. It stars Manchu Manoj, Rakul Preet Singh and Jagapathi Babu. The film's music is composed by Achu while Satish Mutyala and S R Shekhar have taken care of the cinematography and editing respectively.

The film released on 31 October 2014. This film is a remake of the 2013 Tamil film Varuthapadatha Valibar Sangam and was a commercial success just like the original. It was later dubbed in Hindi as Don Ki Jung.

== Plot ==
Siva Rama Raju, a noted good samaritan in Parvatipuram who has a bet with Veerraju in the same village that if any one of his three daughters falls in love and elopes, he will either kill the man or cut down his ears and he takes a vow that he will marry off his daughters to the grooms of his choice, neither love marriage nor elopement. Kavita is his third daughter. Raju is a wayward youth who is deeply in love with an English teacher Sunny, at a junior college. Kavita is one of Sunny's students. Raju uses Kavita as a courier to love Sunny; as things proceed, Raju and Kavita fall in love. The rest of the story is all about what happens when they want to get married.

== Cast ==
- Manoj Manchu as Raju (Current Theega)
- Rakul Preet Singh as Kavita
- Jagapathi Babu as Siva Rama Raju
- Harish Siva as Harsha
- Vennela Kishore as Raju's friend
- Tanikella Bharani as Chandraiah
- Raghu Babu as Siva Rama Raju's henchman
- Supreeth as Veerraju
- Srinivas as Seenu
- Kamal as C.I.
- Prudhvi Raj as Prakash
- Jeeva as Siva Rama Raju's henchman
- Kadambari Kiran as constable
- Gautam Raju as constable
- Siva Reddy as orchestra singer
- Fish Venkat as Siva Rama Raju's henchman
- Tarzan as Siva Rama Raju's henchman
- Thagubothu Ramesh as Raju's friend
- Dhanraj as Raju's friend
- Jyothi as Ganamrutam
- Pavitra Lokesh as Parvati
- Satya Krishnan as a police officer
- Sunny Leone as Sunny teacher (cameo appearance)
- Sampoornesh Babu as Sunny's fiancé (cameo appearance)
- Shilpi Sharma as an item number
- Sambaa Siva as Vinay

== Production ==
Suresh Kondeti had acquired the remake rights of Varuthapadatha Valibar Sangam by October 2013.

== Music ==
Current Theega

Soundtrack album To Current Theega by Achu Rajamani
- Released: 14 September 2014
- Recorded: 2013–2014
- Genre: Feature film soundtrack
- Length: 24:57
- Language: Telugu
- Label: Junglee Music
- Producer: Achu Rajamani

Achu Rajamani chronology
Ra Ra... Krishnayya (2014)	Current Theega (2014)	Urumeen (2015)

Achu Rajamani composed the music for this film. The soundtrack consists of 7 songs and a piece of theme music whose lyrics were penned by Ramajogayya Sastry, Varikuppala Yadagiri Goud, Anantha Sreeram and Bhaskarabhatla. Manchu Manoj sang a "Devadas break up" song, which was released on 9 September 2014 along with its behind the scenes video. It was a situational break up song for the climax when the heroine dumps the hero. Nageswara Reddy and Achu suggested he sing the song, which he accepted. It received a viral response and Manoj dedicated it to all the girls who inspired him. Chinmayi sang a song named "Padahaarellainaa" penned by Anantha Sreeram.

At the end of June 2014, the makers planned to release the audio in August 2014.

The soundtrack received positive reviews from critics. The Times of India called it "a record that will take you by surprise" and rated it 3.5 out of 5. In contrast, Milliblog wrote "Karthik is fabulous in his two melodies, the bordering-on-Charukesi Pilla and the short, mellow Kallalo. The soundtrack’s highlight is Padahaarellainaa, which exploits Chinmayi’s fantastic vocals to great effect and layers many interesting sounds onto a dreamy, waltz’y melody. Barring these, this soundtrack is a step down from Achu’s recent form." The soundtrack was a chart-topper and according to Trade experts, it garnered tremendous likes and has been shared in the social media extensively within hours of its official online release who called it a "viral darling".

Original Track listing (Telugu)
No.	Title	Lyrics	Artist(s)	Length
1.	"Ammay Nadumu"	Ramajogayya Sastry	Achu Rajamani, M. M. Manasi	4:00
2.	"Current Teega (Theme Music)"	NA	NA	1:21
3.	"Kallalo Unna Prema"	Varikuppala Yadagiri Goud	Karthik	1:42
4.	"Nene Nene Current Teega"	Ramajogayya Sastry	Ranjith	3:50
5.	"Padahaarellainaa"	Anantha Sreeram	Chinmayi	3:28
6.	"Pilla O Pilla"	Ramajogayya Sastry	Karthik	4:00
7.	"Pothe Ponee Poraa"	Varikuppala Yadagiri Goud	Manchu Manoj	3:43
8.	"Yerra Yerra Cheera"	Bhaskarabhatla	Jassie Gift, Kamalaja	2:53
Total length:				24:57

All tracks are written by Kishan Paliwal

Track listing (Hindi Dubbed)
No.	Title	Artist(s)	Length
1.	"Jhakkas Hain Tu Super"	Khushboo Jain, Ravi Chowdhry, Abid Jamal	04:00
2.	"Pyaar Mein Ye Kya Hua"	Ravi Chowdhry, Abid Jamal	01:41
3.	"Pyaar Mein Jeena"	Ravi Chowdhry, Abid Jamal	01:23
4.	"Dil Haare Sajnaa"	Khushboo Jain	03:27
5.	"Zara Dekh Yaara"	Khushboo Jain, Ravi Chowdhry, Abid Jamal	00:35
Total length:			11:10

== Release ==
=== Theatrical ===
The film received an A certificate by Central Board of Film Certification due to the bold item track featuring Sunny Leone.
