= Sree Lakshmi Prasanna Pictures =

Indian film production company

- Industry: Entertainment
- Founded: Hyderabad, Andhra Pradesh in 1982
- Founder: Manchu Mohan Babu
- Headquarters: Hyderabad, India
- Key people: Manchu Mohan Babu
- Products: Films
- Owner: Manchu Mohan Babu
- Subsidiaries: 24 Frames Factory; Manchu Entertainment
- Website: SLP Pictures

Sree Lakshmi Prasanna Pictures is an Indian film production company established by Manchu Mohan Babu on the name of his daughter Manchu Lakshmi Prasanna, in 1982. The company is based in Hyderabad. The first movie was Pratigna which successfully ran for 100 Days. Some of the most popular blockbusters are ''Assembly Rowdy'', Rowdygari Pellam, Alludu Garu, Major Chandrakanth, Pedarayudu and Rayalaseema Ramanna Chowdary have made the Sree Lakshmi Prasanna Pictures (SLPP) as one of the premier film houses in the country.

== History ==
In 1993 the production company produced a film Major Chandrakanth with NTR and Mohan Babu directed by K.Raghavendra Rao. It was released on 23 April 1993. The movie became a big hit at the box office. The audience were thrilled to see NTR in such a powerful role and particularly with Punya Bhoomi naa desam song in the movie, in which he was seen in the roles of Alluri Seetharama Raju, Chathrapathi Sivaji, Veerapandy Katta Brahmanna and Subhash Chandrabose. The film had stood out as one of the masterpieces in the Telugu film industry.

== Film production ==
Year	Film	Actors	Director	Notes
1982	Prathigna			
1983	Dharma Poratam			
1984	Padmavyuham			
1984	Bhale Ramudu			
1985	Ragile Gundelu			
1985	Edadugula Bandham			
1986	Maanavudu Daanavudu			
1987	Veera Prathap			
1989	Naa Mogudu Nanke Sontham	Mohan Babu, Vani Vishwanath| |Dasari		
1990	Alludugaru	Mohan Babu, Shobana, Ramya Krishna	K. Raghavendra Rao	
1990	Maa Inti Katha			
1991	Assembly Rowdy	Mohan Babu, Divya Bharti	B. Gopal	
1991	Rowdy Gari Pellam	Mohan Babu, Shobana	K. Raghavendra Rao	
1992	Brahma	Mohan Babu, Shilpa Shirodkar		
1993	Major Chandrakanth	N. T. Rama Rao, Sharada, Mohan Babu, Nagma, Ramya Krishna	K. Raghavendra Rao	
1993	Kunti Puthrudu			
1994	Allari Police			
1994	Punya Bhoomi Naa Desam			
1995	Pedarayudu	Mohan Babu, Rajinikanth, Bhanupriya, Soundarya	Ravi Raja Pinisetty	
1997	Adavilo Anna			
1997	Collector Garu			
1998	Rayudu	Mohan Babu, Rachana, Soundarya	Ravi Raja Pinisetty	
1999	Yamajathakudu			
1999	Postman			
2000	Rayalaseema Ramanna Chowdary		Suresh Krissna	
2001	Adhipathi	Mohan Babu, Nagarjuna, Preeti Jhangiani, Soundarya	Ravi Raja Pinisetty	
2002	Tappu Chesi Pappu Koodu	Mohan Babu, Srikanth, Gracy Singh, Sujatha and Radhika Chaudhari	A. Kodandarami Reddy	
2003	Vishnu	Manchu Vishnu		
2004	Shiva Shankar		Mohan Babu, Soundaraya	
2004	Suryam	Manchu Vishnu, Celina Jaitly, Veda		
2005	Political Rowdy	Mohan Babu, Charmme Kaur, Abbas	Adi	
2005	Sri	Manchu Manoj, Tamannaah, Mohan Babu	Dasaradh	
2006	Game	Manchu Vishnu, Mohan Babu, Shobana, Parvati Melton, Shriya Saran	Ram Prasad	
2007	Raju Bhai	Manoj Manchu, Sheela	Suriya Kiran	
2008	Krishnarjuna	Manchu Vishnu, Nagarjuna, Mohan Babu, Mamta Mohandas	P.Vasu	
2008	Nenu Meeku Telusa?	Manchu Manoj, Sneha Ullal, Riya Sen	Ajay Sastry	
2009	Saleem	Manchu Vishnu, Ileana D'Cruz, Mohan Babu	YVS Chowdary	
2010	Jhummandi Naadam	Manchu Manoj, Taapsee Pannu, Mohan Babu	K. Raghavendra Rao	
2013	Pandavulu Pandavulu Thummeda	Mohan Babu, Manchu Vishnu, Manchu Manoj, Raveena Tandon, Hansika Motwani, Pranitha Subhash, Varun Sandesh, Tanish	Srivas	
2015	Mama Manchu Alludu Kanchu	Mohan Babu, Meena, Ramya Krishna, Allari Naresh, Poorna	Srinivasa Reddy	Co Production with 24 Frames Factory
2018	Gayatri	Mohan Babu, Vishnu Manchu, Shriya Saran, Nikhila Vimal	Madan (film director)	Co Production with 24 Frames Factory
2022	Son of India	Mohan Babu, Tanikella Bharani, Ali	Diamond Ratnababu	
