= Sree (film) =

2005 film by Dasaradh

- Directed by: Dasarath
- Written by: Kona Venkat (dialogues)
- Screenplay by: Gopimohan
- Story by: Dasarath
- Produced by: Manchu Lakshmi Prasanna
- Starring: Manoj Manchu; Tamannaah Bhatia
- Cinematography: S. Arun Kumar
- Edited by: Gautham Raju
- Music by: Sandeep Chowta
- Production company: Sree Lakshmi Prasanna Pictures
- Release date: 3 December 2005
- Running time: 150 minutes
- Country: India
- Language: Telugu
- Budget: est. ₹3 crore

Sree is a 2005 Indian Telugu-language action drama film directed by Dasaradh and starring Manoj Manchu and Tamannaah Bhatia (in her Telugu debut). The film received negative reviews and underperformed at the box office, despite having a good opening.

== Plot ==
Bhikshapati is the cruellest landlord in Rayalaseema. He is on his way to hunt down the family of Sandhya who stay in Bhuvaneswar. Sree grows up in Bhuvaneswar with his widowed mother. Sree falls in love at first sight with Sandhya. When things are getting right between Sandhya and Sree, Bhikshapati's men enter Bhuvaneswar. Sree rescues the family of Sandhya from Bhikshapati's men. Then he also finds out that there is some connection between his father and Bhikshapati's men. The rest of the story is about how he returns to Rayalaseema and rescues the people of village from the clutches of the feudal landlord Bikshapati.

== Cast ==
- Manoj Manchu as Sriram
- Tamannaah Bhatia as Sandhya
- Devaraj as Bhikshapati
- Sukanya as Sriram's mother
- Sunil as Subbarao
- Brahmanandam as Singer
- Naga Babu
- Raghu Babu
- Subhashini
- Jaya Prakash Reddy
- Ajay as Ravi
- Giri Babu
- Ahuti Prasad
- Paruchuri Venkateswara Rao
- Dharmavarapu Subrahmanyam
- Jeeva
- Satyam Rajesh as Sriram's friend
- Banerjee
- Rallapalli
- Khayyum as Sriram's friend
- Madhusudhan Rao

Cameo appearance

- Mohan Babu as Basawadu

== Production ==
The film began production on 11 May 2005. Tamannaah Bhatia was only 15 years old during filming.

== Music ==
The music was composed by Sandeep Chowta and released by Aditya Music. The song "Sindhura Sindhura" was shot an Annapoorna Studios in November 2005 under the choreography of Ahmed Khan.

Sree

Soundtrack album by Sandeep Chowta
- Released: 14 November 2005
- Recorded: 2005
- Genre: Soundtrack
- Length: 25:26
- Label: Aditya Music
- Producer: Sandeep Chowta

Sandeep Chowta chronology
Super (2005)	Sree (2005)	Political Rowdy (2005)

Track list
No.	Title	Lyrics	Singer(s)	Length
1.	"Prema Prema"	Bhaskarabhatla Ravi Kumar	Rajesh Krishnan, Shreya Ghoshal	4:31
2.	"Sindhura"	Bhuvana Chandra	Sandeep Chowta, Ella Pragada	4:17
3.	"Yem Pilla"	Bhaskarabhatla Ravi Kumar	Mano (singer), Anuradha Sriram	4:02
4.	"Are Chi Chi"	Bhuvana Chandra	Rajesh Krishnan, Shweta Pandit, Nikita Nigam	5:04
5.	"Mari Mari"	Bhaskarabhatla Ravi Kumar	Sowmya Raoh	1:41
6.	"Holi Holi"	Suddala Ashok Teja	Rajesh Krishnan, Sonu Kakkar, Nikita Nigam	5:51
Total length:				25:26

== Reception ==
Jeevi of Idlebrain.com wrote that "The predictable plot of the film does not leave anything fresh to the viewer. The screenplay should have been better". A critic from Full Hyderabad wrote that "on the whole, Sri is a movie to skip. Only fans of Mohan Babu might salvage something for his son". A critic from Indiaglitz wrote that "Sri, on the whole, may be a title of respect. But the film deserves little".
