= 24 Frames Factory =

Indian film production company

24 Frames Factory Private Limited
- Company type: Private
- Industry: Entertainment
- Founded: Hyderabad in 21 July 2007
- Founder: Vishnu Manchu
- Headquarters: Hyderabad, India
- Area served: India
- Key people: Vishnu Manchu
- Products: Films
- Services: Distribution; Film production TV production
- Owner: Vishnu Manchu
- Parent: Sree Lakshmi Prasanna Pictures
- Subsidiaries: Manchu Entertainment
- Website: 24 Frames Factory

24 Frames Factory is an Indian film production company established by Vishnu Manchu, son of actor, Mohan Babu in 2007 and is subsidiary of Sree Lakshmi Prasanna Pictures.

== Film production ==
Films that are produced under this banner are mostly with the actor Manchu Mohan Babu's family are;

Year	Film	Notes
2011	Vastadu Naa Raju	
2012	Dhenikaina Ready	Remake of Udayapuram Sulthan
2013	Doosukeltha	
2014	Pandavulu Pandavulu Tummeda	Co-production with Sree Lakshmi Prasanna Pictures
2014	Rowdy	Co-production with AV Pictures
2014	Anukshanam	Co-production with AV Pictures
2014	Current Theega	Remake of Varuthapadatha Valibar Sangam
2015	Singham 123	
2015	Dynamite	Remake of Arima Nambi
2015	Mama Manchu Alludu Kanchu	Co-production with Sree Lakshmi Prasanna Pictures
2021	Mosagallu	Co-production with Sree Lakshmi Prasanna Pictures
2022	Son of India	Co-production with Sree Lakshmi Prasanna Pictures
2022	Ginna	Co-production with AVA Entertainment
2025	Kannappa	Co-production with AVA Entertainment

== Film distribution ==
Year	Film
2012	Dhenikaina Ready
2013	Doosukeltha
2014	Pandavulu Pandavulu Tummeda
2014	Anukshanam
2014	Current Theega
2014	Erra Bus

== T.V production ==
- O intikatha
- Intilo Ramaiah Veedilo Krish
- Happy Days – First Session
- Lakshmi Talk Show
- Aam Aha Kma Kahaa
- Happy Days – Second Session
- Tirumala Mahatyam

== Short Film Contest ==
Vishnu Manchu started a Short Film Contest launched by his premier production house 24 Frames Factory. The jury members of this short film contest are Telugu filmmakers such as Ram Gopal Varma, Deva Katta, B.V.S.Ravi, Dasarath and writer duo Kona Venkat and Gopimohan. The duration of the competing short film should be three minutes.

The short film contest will be an annual affair, and the winners of the inaugural annual contest will be announced every year on actor-producer Mohan Babu's birthday 19 March.
