= Rowdy (2014 film) =

2014 film by Ram Gopal Varma

- Theatrical release poster
- Directed by: Ram Gopal Varma
- Written by: Ram Gopal Varma
- Produced by: R. Vijay Kumar; P. Gajendra Naidu; M. Parthasarathi Naidu
- Starring: Vishnu Manchu; Mohan Babu; Jayasudha; Shanvi Srivastav
- Cinematography: Satish Mutyala
- Edited by: Santosh Bammidi; Kamal R.
- Music by: Sai Karthik
- Production companies: 24 Frames Factory; AV Pictures
- Release date: 4 April 2014
- Running time: 109 minutes
- Country: India
- Language: Telugu

Rowdy is a 2014 Indian Telugu-language action drama film written and directed by Ram Gopal Varma. A remake of the director's Hindi film Sarkar (2005), it stars Vishnu Manchu and his father Mohan Babu with Jayasudha and Shanvi Srivastav in important roles.

Sai Karthik composed the music for this film, while Satish Mutyala handled the cinematography. The principal photography commenced on 26 December 2013 and ended on 21 February 2014 in 30 working days. It was dubbed into Hindi by the same name. The film also used sync sound and a three camera setup to reduce the work of dubbing and camera angles while in post production.

The film released on 4 April 2014 (worldwide) and 3 April 2014 (United States) in over 50 screens. Upon release, the film received positive reviews, with critics praising the narrative and the performances of Mohan Babu, Vishnu Manchu and Jayasudha. The film minted ₹11.13 crore (US$1.2 million) on the first weekend of its release. The film minted a worldwide share of ₹33 crore (US$3.4 million) at the end of the second week of its run, and was declared a box office hit.

== Plot ==
The film opens at night on a street in Hyderabad with Krishna (Vishnu Manchu) saving Sirisha (Shanvi Srivastava) from some eve-teasers and accompanying her to the hostel where she stays. On the journey, they find out that they both hail from the Rayalaseema region of Andhra Pradesh. When Sirisha asks Krishna about the details of his father, the scene shifts to Krishna's native place, where his father, a don fondly called Anna (Mohan Babu) and, with respect, Annagaru, punishes a teacher named Sankar Rao for harassing his pregnant wife for dowry on the complaint of the woman's father, Rama Rao. Anna is a sexagenarian who always thinks about the welfare of the people of Rayalaseema, and they also revere him as equal to god. He is also a powerful and influential don who controls Rayalaseema's political affairs. His close friend Ananda Rao (Paruchuri Gopala Krishna) is a politician from the ruling party. He, along with the party, extends full support to Anna to stop the Nandavaram project, which could destroy 34 villages. Meanwhile, a group of influential people working under a mysterious man tries to make the project earn crores. The group consists of KR, Vedantham Murthy aka Vedam (Tanikella Bharani), Chandi (Jeeva), and Seshagiri.

Krishna returns home, where Anna kills his opponent, Guruva Reddy (Banerjee), and appoints the latter's henchmen as his own by promising a slightly higher salary. Then, Anna's family is introduced. Anna lives with his wife Lakshmi (Jayasudha), elder son Bhushan (Kishore), and younger son Krishna. Bhushan is married and has a son, but he never loved them. Unlike his father and his dutiful, devoted brother, Bhushan is a spoiled brat who often terrorizes people in Anna's name, instilling fear in their hearts. When a young woman's brother warns Bhushan, Bhushan comes to their home, kidnaps the woman, and sexually assaults her in his farmhouse. Angry at his father and greedy for money, Bhushan joins KR's group to form the Nandavaram project. Meanwhile, Krishna and Sirisha are deeply in love. Anna's trusted henchman Ramudu finds out that she is the daughter of Gavarraju, Anna's enemy, whom he killed at Tirupathi during an assassination attempt. Though Sirisha is aware of it, she has no objection to joining his family. Anna also respects Krishna's decision to marry her and accepts their alliance.

Meanwhile, Sirisha informs Krishna in their regular meeting that her friend has been kidnapped and kept in Anna's farmhouse by Bhushan, who recently thrashed her brother. She adds that no one dared to tell Anna because of Bhushan. Krishna tells the whole matter to Anna, and when the latter finds the woman assaulted there, he apologizes to her and tells Ramudu to drop her off at her home. He also imposes a house arrest on Bhushan there forever to ensure the safety of the innocent people, but at Lakshmi's request, he lets him enter his house again. Later, Ramudu invites Anna and Lakshmi to attend his daughter's wedding, and they happily accept. However, Sirisha's brother reveals to Krishna that Anna is going to be fatally attacked on the way. At the time of the execution, firing starts at Anna's vehicle. In this confusion, Bhushan kills his wife and son, unbeknownst to anyone. Anna is severely injured and attacked by the rivals, whom Krishna kills. Anna is sent to the nearby hospital. Inspector Gogin Rao (Ravi Babu) asks Anna's men to leave the hospital because the patients and their relatives are frightened of seeing them carrying weapons. This results in a brawl between Krishna and Gogin Rao, and the former is arrested for attacking a police officer on duty.

However, it is later revealed that Gogin Rao is not as sincere as he is and actually works for KR. Sirisha goes to the police station and tells Krishna that Anna will be attacked again by the rivals' men. Krishna goes there and saves Anna from the goons. Later, as both plans fail, Bhushan goes to the hospital carrying oranges and soon leaves. However, he keeps explosives inside the oranges so that Anna dies in a blast, as suggested by KR and Vedam. Unfortunately, Lakshmi cuts them and dies in the blast. Anna, who was on the way to the room conducting medical tests, collapses and understands what happened. After Lakshmi's funeral is conducted, Krishna meets Anna; tells him that KR, Gogin Rao, Chandi, Vedam, Seshagiri, and Bhushan are the culprits; and vows to kill all of them. Krishna kills Gogin Rao by strangling him with a wire; Seshagiri by feeding him a poisoned cake; Chandi by suffocating him after locking him in a car filled with gas; Vedam by hanging him from a tree; and KR by setting him on fire. Later, Krishna meets Bhushan and tells him about the latter's plans and deeds. When Bhushan feels guilty, Krishna calls him a mad dog and shoots him.

Finally, during Lakshmi's last rites, the person behind the group is revealed as Ananda Rao. His close associates hold more than a 50% stake in the Nandavaram project. With that money, he planned to shift to the opposition party and win the elections. Since Anna would oppose it, he wanted to murder him and joined hands with KR and his group. On Anna's request, Krishna himself murders Ananda Rao. The film ends with Anna conducting Lakshmi's death rituals and Krishna appointing Ananda Rao's gunmen as his henchmen, promising a slightly higher salary, as Anna did regarding Guruva Reddy's henchmen.

== Cast ==
- Vishnu Manchu as Krishna
- Mohan Babu as Anna
- Jayasudha as Lakshmi
- Shanvi Srivastav as Sirisha
- Kishore as Bhushan
- Paruchuri Gopala Krishna as Anand Rao
- Tanikella Bharani as Vedantham Murthy aka Vedam
- Ravi Babu as Gogin Rao
- Jeeva as Chandi
- Banerjee as Guruva Reddy
- Kalicharan Sanjay

== Production ==
In mid November 2013, it was reported that Ram Gopal Varma would direct Vishnu Manchu, which was confirmed by the actor in an interaction with the press. In mid-December 2013, the project materialized, and it was also reported that Ram Gopal Varma wanted to recruit Regina Cassandra as the heroine. In the end of December 2013, Mohan Babu was said to be a part of the film, and the shooting started on 26 December 2013 after a simple launch event. The filming continued at an incredible pace, and in early January 2014, a song on Mohan Babu and 2,000 extras was shot at Ramoji Film City in Hyderabad in which the people hailed him as their supremo and godfather.

After their previous film Pandavulu Pandavulu Tummeda released and became a success at the box office, it was declared in early February that the film was titled Rowdy which was confirmed by Mohan Babu at his office contrary to the reports that the film was titled Ottu, Annagaru and Seema Lekka. At the same time, Shanvi Srivastav, who was well known for her performances in the films Lovely and Adda, was selected for a short yet essential role in the film and was paired with Vishnu. In the third week of February 2014, it was reported that the film's shoot is nearing completion at an incredible speed with a romantic song on Vishnu and Shanvi being shot in just two days.

The filming finally ended on 21 February 2014 in just 30 working days. The producers said that they had a very tough time at the time of the shooting of action sequences, because of RGV's insistence on reality. The producers spoke "Rowdy is a film, we were really passionate about". It was also reported that an 11-minute action episode on Mohan Babu and Vishnu by firmly focusing the camera on them. "The interval sequence is by far one of the best fights I have ever done. Entire Credit to RGV. He has captured great action timing and finely tuned aggression by the two lead actors in the film" said Vishnu.

The producers also hailed Ram Gopal Varma regarding the handling of sentimental scenes in the film. They said "Though the director has included lots of action and drama in the film, we admired the sentimental scenes between Mohan Babu and Jayasudha. We never expected Ram Gopal Varma to add this element with such vigour. He surprised not only me but also the lead stars, with his neat direction of the sentimental sequences. The chemistry between Mohan Babu and Jayasudha that once fluttered the hearts of moviegoers has been captured well all over again with much more intensity" in a statement issued to the IANS.

== Marketing ==
The film's first look was released on 21 February 2014 on the occasion of completion of shoot. The first look received unanimously positive response. The film's trailer released on 7 March 2014 by Vishnu himself from USA. The trailer received great positive response from all the corners though some opined that the film had shades of Ram Gopal Varma's Hindi film Sarkar. On 11 March 2014 Ram Gopal Varma unveiled the promo of the romantic song Nee Meeda Ottu. The teaser of 107 seconds, which portrayed on screen chemistry between the lead stars Vishnu Manchu and Shanvi Srivastav, garnered tremendous response in means of shares and views on social networking sites within few hours of its release.

As a part of the promotion, Ram Gopal Varma and Vishnu Manchu visited Visakhapatnam where they interacted with media and audiences at VMax Multiplex theater. The full videos of Nee Meeda Ottu and Seema Lekka along with an action sequence were shown to the media and audiences there. After receiving good response there, the team of the film including Ram Gopal Varma, Mohan Babu and Vishnu Manchu visited Mallikharjuna theatre in Hyderabad where the team interacted with media and the audiences at the theater and also projected about 10 mins of songs and scenes from the film there.

== Soundtrack ==
Sai Karthik composed the music and the background score for the film. The film's audio launch was held on 20 March 2014 at the Sree Vidyanikethan Engineering College in Tirupati, and the album was distributed under the Puri Sangeet label. On 29 March, a separate album featuring the original score was released as a tribute to veteran composer Ilaiyaraaja, whom Varma worked on Siva (1989). The cycle chase theme from Siva was integrated as the main theme for the film.

== Release ==
In early March 2014, it was reported that the film would release worldwide on 28 March 2014 clashing with Nandamuri Balakrishna's Legend. On 19 March 2014 it was officially declared that the film would release on 4 April 2014 in India and a day before i.e. on 3 April 2014 in USA. It was also reported later that the film will release with English subtitles in major markets worldwide to take full advantage of RGV film's pull across India and in the global markets. However, the leaders of Uttarandhra Joint Action Committee launched a morcha in Visakhapatnam demanding to ban the release of the movie. Alleging that the movie promotes rowdyism, the protesters stated that they will be filing a petition with the Election Commission to ban the film's release. The protesters contested that the episodes in the movie could be inflammatory. Meanwhile, the film was awarded an A certificate without any cuts from Central Board of Film Certification.

== Reception ==
The film received positive reviews from critics, though they drew comparisons and similarities with Varma's previous film Sarkar.

The Hindu gave a review stating "The film is helped hugely by good performances from Mohan Babu, Vishnu and Jayasudha. While Varma can be commended for channelising Mohan Babu’s aggression in an apt role, one wishes he hadn’t made the actor say ‘respect’ so many times that it becomes a joke. Rowdy is one of the better films from Varma is recent times but offers nothing new in content." Oneindia Entertainment gave a review stating "Overall, Ram Gopal Varma has taken the story from his Sarkar and weaved a different screenplay for Rowdy keeping Telugu audience in mind. He has also added a few commercial ingredients to it. It is a good entertainer and will be a treat for action lovers. Must watch the film for Mohan Babu fans" and rated the film 3/5. Deccan Chronicle gave a review stating "Varma’s films are always technically good and ‘Rowdy’ is no exception. The action sequences are well choreographed, especially the one where goons surround Mohan Babu. RGV, however, is still out of touch and most of the scenes and camera angles are mere repetitions of his earlier films. If you haven't seen ‘Sarkar’, you can watch ‘Rowdy’, especially for Mohan Babu's performance" and rated the film 2.5/5.

123telugu.com gave a review stating "‘Rowdy’ is an intense action thriller that makes for a good watch. If you have seen Godfather, the impact may be a little less. The movie's appeal might be limited to A centers alone. Watch the film for Mohan Babu" and rated the film 3.25/5. idlebrain.com gave a review stating "Mohan Babu is a superb actor. After M Dharmaraju MA and Rayalaseema Ramanna Chowdary, this is the most compelling character he has done in his career. It took a director of Ram Gopal Varma calibre to present Mohan Babu in a natural avatar. Plus points of the film are Mohan Babu, Vishnu Manchu, and their characterizations. On the flip side, a toned-down violence and a compelling second half would have made the movie more universal. On a whole, Rowdy is a special film that adds a feather to the cap of Mohan Babu" and rated the film 3/5. IndiaGlitz gave a review stating "If you wanted to see Mohan Babu do an Amitabh Bachchan while retaining his irreverent style, 'Rowdy' fulfills that urge. The discerning might lament it as a dumbed-down version of Sarkar, though" and rated the film 3.25/5.
