= Anukshanam =

2014 Telugu slasher film

- Theatrical release poster
- Directed by: Ram Gopal Varma
- Written by: Ram Gopal Varma
- Produced by: Vishnu Manchu
- Starring: Vishnu Manchu; Revathi; Surya; Kota Srinivasa Rao; Brahmanandam; Navdeep; Tejaswi Madivada; Madhu Shalini
- Cinematography: Nani Chamidisetty
- Edited by: Santosh Bammidi; Kamal R.
- Production company: 24 Frames Factory
- Distributed by: 24 Frames Factory (worldwide)
- Release date: 13 September 2014
- Running time: 82 minutes
- Country: India
- Language: Telugu

Anukshanam (Telugu:అనుక్షణం, English: Every second) is a 2014 Indian Telugu-language mystery thriller, and slasher film written and directed by Ram Gopal Varma, starring Vishnu Manchu and Revathi in lead roles. Ram Gopal Varma has started a new distribution system with this film by auctioning this movie through a website. Released on 13 September 2014 without an intermission, the film opened to a mixed reception, with praise for Vishnu's performance, the script and screenplay, but criticism of the gore, bloodshed and lack of characterisation. The film had a mediocre reception at the box-office.

== Plot ==
Inspired by a real-life incident, the film is based on a serial killer who sends a wave of panic across Hyderabad. The story starts with the murder of a young woman. Even as the police try to investigate the case and the news is spread all over television channels and media, more murders take place. In comes special officer, Gautam (Vishnu Manchu), who gets onto the case and attempts to figure out what could have led to the murders. Meanwhile, a series of murders take place and there is uproar among the public and pressure on police to trace the killer. The murderer is known to be a taxi driver and Gautam informs the media, but due to the pressure from the Home minister (Kota Srinivasa Rao), Gautam retracts his statement. The murders continue and Gautam advises the people not to roam outside after dark. However, the serial killer continues the murders in daylight. The serial killer is traced when he tries to murder a TV reporter. The police arrive in time to arrest him, but he escapes and in the process kills two officers. The media is later given the photo of the serial killer. The serial killer's mother is arrested and is interrogated. She reveals that when her son was a child, he killed animals in the same way he has been killing the girls. The serial killer then goes to Gautam's house and kills his wife. The serial killer is traced when he tries to murder Sailaja (Revathi) and another girl. Gautam enters the scene and tries to murder him the same way as he had murdered the girls. However, before he does that, Shailaja stops him and says he needs mental help. In the end, the serial killer is arrested by the police and Gautham walks away.

== Cast ==
- Vishnu Manchu as DCP Gautam, Crime Branch Special Officer
- Surya as Sitaram
- Revathi as Shailaja, a Psychologist
- Kota Srinivasa Rao as Harish Reddy, Home Minister
- Brahmanandam as Shailaja's brother
- Navdeep as Ajit (in a cameo appearance)
- Tejaswi Madivada as Satya, Gautam's wife
- Madhu Shalini as Asha, TV 6 News Reporter
- Sana as Sitaram's mother
- Supreeth as Giri
- Sravan as Chetan

== Reception ==
A critic from 123telugu rated the film 3 1/4 out of 5 and wrote that "On the whole, Anukshanam is surely RGV’s better films in the recent past. Interesting set up, racy narration and superb performance by Vishnu are huge assets". Jeevi of Idlebrain.com rated the film three out of five and declared "Anukshanam is a film that has chances to appeal to the movie lovers who like this genre".
