= Vishnu Manchu =

Indian actor (born 1981)

- Manchu Vishnu photoshoot 2014
- Born: Manchu Vishnuvardhan Babu; 23 November 1981 (age 44); Madras, Tamil Nadu, India
- Occupations: Actor; film producer; educationist; businessman
- Years active: 2003–present
- Spouse: Manchu Viranica (m. 2009)
- Children: 4
- Father: Mohan Babu
- Relatives: Lakshmi Manchu (sister); Manchu Manoj (half brother)

Manchu Vishnuvardhan Babu (born 23 November 1981) is an Indian actor and film producer known for his works in Telugu cinema and television. Manchu had a brief stint as a child artist with the 1985 film Ragile Gundelu. Years later, he starred in the 2003 action film Vishnu, for which he won the Filmfare Best Male Debut. He is currently serving as the president of the Movie Artists Association since 2021.

He is the co-owner of the film production house 24 Frames Factory and is an educationalist through Sree Vidyanikethan Educational Trust, founded by his father, Mohan Babu, a veteran Telugu actor. He is a founder and chairman of New York Academy, a school in Hyderabad for which his wife, Viranica, is the director and his father Mohan Babu, is the chair person. He is also the chairman of Spring Board Academy and Spring Board International Preschools which has more than 75 branches spread across Andhra Pradesh, Telangana, Tamil Nadu and Karnataka. Vishnu Manchu is the pro-chancellor of Mohan Babu University in Tirupati established in 2022 by his father Mohan Babu.

In 2007, he starred in the comedy film Dhee, which became a hit, and Manchu established his career in Telugu cinema. Manchu is one of the sponsors of the Celebrity Cricket League Telugu Warriors.

== Early life ==
Manchu Vishnuvardhan Babu was born in Madras, Tamil Nadu, India (now Chennai) to actor Mohan Babu and Vidya Devi. He grew up with his younger paternal half-brother Manoj and sister Lakshmi.

After completing schooling from the Padmaseshadri Bala Bhavan School, Manchu went on to take an engineering degree from Sree Vidyanikethan Engineering College, majoring in Computer Sciences and Information Technology. During that time, he represented the Bhaskar JNTU cricket team, and also captained the university basketball team.

== Career ==
=== 1985; 2003–2006: Early work ===
Vishnu Manchu made his acting debut as a child artist in his father Mohan Babu's 1985 film Ragile Gundelu.

He landed his first lead role in the film Vishnu (2003) directed by Shaji Kailas, for which he won the Filmfare Best Male Debut. He played a guy who wants to win his childhood love with his own merits against many hurdles. The following year, he was seen in the film Suryam (2004) in which he played a guy who aims to fulfill the last wish of his mother. Manchu made a cameo appearance as a dancer in Political Rowdy (2005), a romantic action drama.

He next appeared in the action-drama Astram (2006), as an IPS officer who has been appointed to finish off the ultras. Soon after, Manchu was cast in Game (2006), as Vijay Raj, sharing screen space with his celebrity father Mohan Babu and yesteryear heroine Shobana.

He finally got his critical breakthrough with the movie Dhee, alongside Genelia D'Souza. Released in 2007, Dhee became his first commercially successful film. It was remade in Tamil as Mirattal, in Bengali as Khokababu and in Oriya as Tu mo girlfriend. Manchu plunged into the limelight with this role.

=== 2008–present: Career fluctuations ===
He then appeared in the 2008 film Krishnarjuna, the 2009 film Saleem and the 2011 film Vastadu Naa Raju. In 2012, comedy film Dhenikaina Ready got him critical success; the film grossed 200 million at the box office. He then appeared in Doosukeltha, directed by Veeru Potla, he starred opposite Lavanya Tripathi, the film grossed 126.3 million on its first week at the box office. He then appeared along with his father, in the critically acclaimed crime film Rowdy, written and directed by Ram Gopal Varma. The film minted a worldwide share of ₹33 crore (US$3.5 million) at the end of the second week of its run, and was declared a box office hit.

Vishnu starred in G. Nageswara Reddy's Denikaina Ready, which became a hit and succeeded in changing his image. The next year, he had an opportunity to exhibit his versatility as an actor in the titular role of Veeru Potla's rom-com, Doosukeltha. The movie not only established Manchu as an actor, but also grossed more than 15 crore at the box office. His next project fared much better, when he played the Gambler Gopi in the ensemble comedy Pandavulu Pandavulu Tummeda (2014), which featured an ensemble cast of Manchu Manoj, Mohan Babu, Raveena Tandon, Hansika Motwani, Pranitha Subhash, and Varun Sandesh.

Vishnu Manchu then played the role Krishna in Rowdy (2014) alongside his father Mohan Babu. Showing his range as an actor, Manchu later portrayed DCP Goutham in the commercially unsuccessful but critically adored film Anukshanam (2014), helmed by Ram Gopal Varma. He continued as a dramatic actor in the 2014 Erra Bus, produced and directed by Dasari Narayana Rao. He then appeared in the action thriller Dynamite, directed by Deva Katta. Though they made an interesting movie along the way, they paid for it at the box office. Manchu further proved his comedic talents with the romantic comedy entertainer Eedo Rakam Aado Rakam (2015), in which he co-starred with Raj Tarun. The same year, he completed filming for Saradaa but the film remains unreleased. In 2017, he starred in Luckunnodu, which performed poorly at the box office. By the end of 2017, he had already appeared in 20 films.

His film in 2018 include the crime drama Gayatri, in which Shriya Saran and his father Mohan Babu play other important characters and the comedy film Achari America Yatra; and the political thriller Voter 2019. His next film, Mosagallu (2021), is a crossover film directed by American filmmaker Jeffrey Gee Chin based on the world's biggest IT Scam, filmed in India and USA. It features Kajal Aggarwal, Suniel Shetty, Navdeep, Naveen Chandra and Ruhi Singh apart from Manchu. It was released in March 2021 and collected a gross of 38 crores in the long run and stands as an average runner at box office.

In October 2021, he contested and won the elections of Movie Artists Association (MAA) as its president against Prakash Raj. Vishnu made the announcement about his next project titled 'Ginna' is being produced by Ava Entertainment and 24 Frames Factory which was initially planned to release in August but later released in October 2022 due to production delays.The film which was made on a budget of 20-25 crores managed to collect only 9.05 crores at the box office as an average runner.

Vishnu announced his dream project Kannappa on 18 August 2023, with the pooja cermoney at Srikalahasti temple in Andhra Pradesh. Where has Vishnu and his father Mohan Babu to co-produce the Kannappa film with a 100 crore budget and shooting began from September 2023. At Cannes 2024, after attending the premiere of Horizon: An American Saga – Chapter 1, Vishnu Manchu along with his wife Viranica Manchu and his father Mohan Babu, joined by renowned Prabhu Deva, presented a teaser of their film 'Kannappa', for a group of select audience which received a warm applause.

== Personal life ==
In 2009, Vishnu Manchu married Viranica Reddy, niece of the Y. S. Rajasekhara Reddy, the then chief minister of Andhra Pradesh. In 2011, they had twin daughters. In January 2018, they had a son and in August 2019, they had a daughter.

== Filmography ==
Key
†	Denotes films that have not yet been released

Year	Title	Role	Notes	Ref.
1985	Ragile Gundelu	Vijay's son	Child artist; credited as Master Vishnuvardhan Babu	
2003	Vishnu	Vishnu	Filmfare Best Male Debut South	
2004	Suryam	Suryam		
2005	Political Rowdy	Dancer	Cameo appearance	
2006	Astram	ACP Siddharth IPS		
2006	Game	Vijay Raj		
2007	Dhee	Srinivas "Babloo" Rao		
2008	Krishnarjuna	Arjun		
2009	Saleem	Saleem / Munna		
2011	Vastadu Naa Raju	Venky		
2012	Denikaina Ready	Suleman / Krishna Shastri	credited as Manchu Vishnuvardhan Babu	
2013	Doosukeltha	Chinna / Venkateshwara Rao		
2014	Pandavulu Pandavulu Tummeda	Vijay		
2014	Rowdy	Krishna		
2014	Anukshanam	Gautam		
2014	A day in the life of Lakshmi Manchu's feet	Himself	Short film	
2014	Erra Bus	Rajesh		
2015	Dynamite	Sivaji Krishna		
2016	Eedo Rakam Aado Rakam	Arjun		
2017	Luckunnodu	Lucky		
2018	Gayatri	Shivaji		
2018	Achari America Yatra	Krishnamachari		
2019	Voter	Gautam		
2021	Mosagallu	Arjun		
2022	Ginna	Gali Nageshwara Rao		
2025	Kannappa	Kannappa & Arjuna		

=== Other roles ===
Year	Title	Credited as		Notes
Year	Title	Producer	Writer	Notes
2003	Siva Shankar	Presenter	No	
2011	Vastadu Naa Raju	Yes	No	
2012	Denikaina Ready	Yes	No	
2013	Doosukeltha	Yes	No	
2014	Pandavulu Pandavulu Tummeda	Yes	No	
2014	Current Theega	Yes	No	
2014	Anukshanam	Yes	No	
2014	Erra Bus	Distributor	No	
2015	Singham 123	Yes	Yes	
2015	Dynamite	Yes	No	
2015	Mama Manchu Alludu Kanchu	Yes	No	
2020	Chadarangam	Yes	No	ZEE5 series
2021	Mosagallu	Yes	Story	
2022	Son Of India	Yes	No	
2025	Kannappa	No	Yes	

== Other work ==
=== Television ===
Vishnu Manchu made his foray into television by directing the 100th episode of Zee Telugu's series Happy Days. The episode achieved the highest TRP ratings among the 700 episodes of the series. Happy Days is also produced by 24 Frames Factory. He has also directed Lakshmi Talk Show or Premathoo Mee Lakshmi.

=== Producer ===
Vishnu Manchu heads the 24 Frames Factory production house which in 2014 produced Pandavulu Pandavulu Tummeda, a comedy film with an ensemble cast. He also heads ThinkSmart, which handles post-production including graphics and other elements for cinema. Atanokkade, from ThinkSmart, won the best video effects award.

=== Educationist ===
Vishnu Manchu is the director of Spring Board International Preschools. When he joined with the Sree Vidyanikethan Educational Trust set up by his father, it was already a well-established educational institution. He took charge of this institution and built them into model institutions offering value-based education to the students. He expanded and diversified it into Spring Board Academy, and became founder and chairman at the New York Academy.

Vishnu Manchu runs the Sree Vidyanikethan Educational Trust, founded by his father. The trust runs the Sree Vidyanikethan International School, Sree Vidyanikethan Degree College, Sree Vidyanikethan Engineering College, Sree Vidyanikethan College of Pharmacy, Sree Vidyanikethan College of Nursing, the Sree Vidyanikethan Institute of Management and the Sree Vidyanikethan College for Post Graduation Studies.

Apart from an actor of repute, Vishnu Manchu is the pro-chancellor of Mohan Babu University at Tirupati, founded in 2022 by his father Mohan Babu.

=== Army Green ===
Vishnu Manchu started a social unit called Army Green for promoting environmental awareness. It adopted small settlements in the vicinity of the Sree Vidyanikethan Institutions.

=== Vishnu Manchu Art Foundation ===
Vishnu Manchu set up an art foundation in Tirupati, the Vishnu Manchu Art Foundation (VMAF). Known as an institution established for the benefit and use of contemporary and gifted artists, the foundation provides a much-needed space free from any financial and commercial constraints. The main aim of the VMAF is to provide help to aspiring and talented artists to evolve the reach of their creativity. VMAF conducts a series of Make Art, Show Art and Beyond Art programmes each year.

As an art educational institution, Vishnu Manchu Art Foundation regularly hosts lectures and discussions on issues relating to the contemporary arts and artists. VMAF is a venue for art lovers and the artistic community to engage in spirited conversations with art critics and renowned academics who showcase their work at the foundation. VMAF is known for its traditional works and injection of new creative ideas and expressions.
