= Mama Manchu Alludu Kanchu =

- Movie poster
- Directed by: Srinivasa Reddy
- Screenplay by: Srinivasa Reddy
- Based on: Be Dune Saade Chaar
- Produced by: Vishnu Manchu
- Starring: Mohan Babu; Allari Naresh; Meena; Ramya Krishna; Poorna; Ali; Varun Sandesh
- Cinematography: Adusumilli Vijaykumar; B. Balamurugan
- Edited by: Gautham Raju
- Music by: Raghu Kunche; Achu Rajamani; Koti
- Production companies: 24 Frames Factory; Sree Lakshmi Prasanna Pictures
- Release date: 25 December 2015
- Country: India
- Language: Telugu

Mama Manchu Alludu Kanchu is a 2015 Indian Telugu-language action comedy film co-written and directed by Srinivasa Reddy and produced by Vishnu Manchu under the 24 Frames Factory banner. It features an ensemble cast comprising Mohan Babu, Allari Naresh, Meena, Ramya Krishna, Poorna, Ali, and Varun Sandesh. It is a remake of the Marathi film Be Dune Saade Chaar (2009) and shares continuity with the 1992 film Allari Mogudu.

The film was officially launched on 19 August 2015 and released on 25 December 2015. The film received mixed reviews from the critics.

== Plot ==
Bhaktavatsalam Naidu (Mohan Babu), who has married two women and has successfully managed to keep the secret of the other woman to both the ladies. His friend Ismail (Ali) helps him in protecting the secret. His first wife Suryakantham (Meena) has a daughter named Sruthi (Poorna) and second wife Priyamvada (Ramya Krishna) has a son Gautham Naidu (Varun Sandesh). Incidentally, the birthdays of both the boy and the girl fall on the same date and in a comedy of errors Naidu swaps the gifts. Gautham and Shruthi want to meet each other to exchange their gifts. Naidu doesn't want this to happen as his secret could be out. So, he requisitions the service of Balaraju (Allari Naresh). But Balaraju falls in love with Sruthi. The film is all about Naidu's plans to keep the secret, on one hand, to keep Balaraju away from Sruthi. Later, Naidu informs about Balaraju to his father. Actually, in Balaraju's village, there is a girl(sister of the village head) who loves Balaraju and her brother compels him to marry his sister. Naidu sends Ismail with a letter informing his father about Balraju. The girl falls in love with the first instance of Ismail. Naidu also tells Sruthi to go to Balraju house to know about Balraju. After much discussion, Sruthi accepts Balraju love. Also, balraju does not inform anything about Naidu to Sruthi. This also makes Naidu accept his love. Later series reveals why Naidu married two of them and also his wives knowing the truth.

== Cast ==
- Allari Naresh as Balaraju / Gautham
- Mohan Babu as Bhakthavatsala Naidu
- Poorna as Shruthi Naidu
- Meena as Suryakantham
- Ramya Krishna as Priyamvada
- Ali as Ismail/Bhakthavatsala Naidu
- Varun Sandesh as Goutham Naidu
- Hridaya
- Sonia Deepti as Divya
- Krishna Bhagavan as Sanyasi Rao

== Soundtrack ==
Mama Manchu Alludu Kanchu

Soundtrack album by Achu Rajamani Raghu Kunche Koti
- Released: 28 November 2015
- Genre: Film soundtrack
- Label: Junglee Music
- Producers: Achu Rajamani; Raghu Kunche; Bappa Lahiri

The audio launch of the film was held on 28 November 2015 at Hyderabad, India. The film's music is composed by Koti, Raghu Kunche and Achu Rajamani.

=== Track listing ===
No.	Title	Music	Singer(s)	Length
1.	"Thanaloni Sagabhaagaanni"	Achu Rajamani	Mano, Anitha
2.	"Tingu Tingu Rangudu"	Raghu Kunche	Raghu Kunche, Malavika
3.	"Chamma Chakka"	Koti	Kumari, Chinmayi, Priya Himesh, Tippu
4.	"Kingulanti Singamanta"	Koti	Shiva, Saicharan
5.	"Title Theme"	Achu Rajamani	Anudeep Dev, Shiva
