= Doosukeltha =

2013 Telugu-language film

- Theatrical Release poster
- Directed by: Veeru Potla
- Screenplay by: Veeru Potla; Gopimohan
- Story by: Veeru Potla
- Produced by: Mohan Babu
- Starring: Vishnu Manchu; Lavanya Tripathi
- Cinematography: Sarvesh Murari
- Edited by: Marthand K. Venkatesh
- Music by: Mani Sharma
- Production company: 24 Frames Factory
- Distributed by: 24 Frames Factory (worldwide)
- Release date: 17 October 2013
- Country: India
- Language: Telugu

Doosukeltha (transl. I will surge ahead) is a 2013 Indian Telugu-language action comedy film directed by Veeru Potla. It stars Manchu Vishnu and Lavanya Tripathi. Mani Sharma composed the music for the film. Mohan Babu produced the film under the banner of 24 Frames Factory. The film became Manchu Vishnu's biggest opener in his career. Final worldwide earnings were ₹ 200.5 million, also making it the biggest hit ever in Vishnu Manchu's overseas career.

== Plot ==
A small bet by Chinna during his childhood results in his family escaping from a village. Eventually, he grows up to become a street smart and intelligent man with a kind heart. Due to his act, the life of Alekhya also gets disturbed, and her family immediately disowns her. She grows up to become a doctor, and a chance incident gets her in touch with Chinna. He starts liking her and also protects her from some unidentified killers. However, after discovering his real identity, Alekhya puts him away. In order to repair the mistake that he did in his childhood, Chinna decides to get Alekhya back to her family, and whether that happens or not forms the rest of the story.

== Cast ==
- Vishnu Manchu as Venkateshwara Rao / Chinna / Venky / Venkanna / Fake Piccheswar
- Lavanya Tripathi as Alekhya / Chinni
- Brahmanandam as Veera Brahmam
- Pankaj Tripathi as Minister Dilleeswara Rao
- Ahuti Prasad as Chinna's father
- Rao Ramesh as Sarweshwar, Alekhya's father
- Vinaya Prasad as Dharani, Alekhya's mother
- Kota Srinivasa Rao as Sr Piccheswar Rao, Alekhya's grandfather
- Nagineedu as Chinni's grandfather
- Ali as Chinna's childhood friend
- Raghu Babu as Swamiji
- Master Bharath as Ranganna
- Shravan as Jagameshwar Rao
- Posani Krishna Murali as Avatar
- Vennela Kishore as Piccheshwar Rao Jr (Original)
- Pruthviraj as Piccheshwar's father
- Prabhakar as Badhram, Dilleeswara Rao's henchman
- Ravi Prakash as Ravi Chandra (Contract Killer)
- Hema as Dr. Sandhya
- Surekha Vani
- Praveen as Veera Bramham's Colony mate
- Sri Sudha Bhimireddy as Nurse
- Samrat Reddy as Dr. Visranth
- Annapurnamma
- Rajitha
- Ushasri
- Prabhas Sreenu
- Chitram Srinu
- Baby Annie as Young Alekhya
- Manava Koteshwar Rao as News Channel Chairman
- Ravi Teja as Narrator
- Lakshmi Manchu (Special appearance in song "Appudappudu")

== Soundtrack ==
The music was composed by Mani Sharma and released by Junglee Music. All lyrics were written by Ramajogayya Sastry.

Doosukeltha

Soundtrack album by Mani Sharma
- Released: 2013
- Recorded: 2013
- Genre: Soundtrack
- Length: 28:44
- Label: Junglee Music
- Producer: Mani Sharma

Mani Sharma chronology
Prema Geema Janta Nai (2013)	Doosukeltha (2013)	Rough (2014)

Track-List
No.	Title	Singer(s)	Length
1.	"Appudappudu"	Dinakar, Narendra	4:51
2.	"Modatti Saari"	Rahul Sipligunj, Sudhamayi	4:55
3.	"Soodimande"	Rahul Sipligunj, Sahiti	4:53
4.	"2010 Summerlo"	Sweekar Agasthi	4:55
5.	"Tandavamade Shivudae"	Shaan, Geetha Madhuri	5:08
6.	"Doosukeltha"	Dinakar, Narendra	3:28
7.	"Uggupaala Rojullone"	Geetha Madhuri	0:34
Total length:			28:44

== Critical reception ==
The film received mixed reviews from critics. The Times of India gave it a score of 2.5/5 stars stating that "The director has taken a lot of liberty with the characterisation. Nevertheless, Vishnu cruises sticking to the characterisation. If Brahmanandam is your excuse to watch the movie, please don't". Idlebrain.com wrote: "First half of the film deals with action and romance episodes. The second half has entertainment and family orientation. Doosukeltha is a film that follows commercial format of entertainment movies to a T. Plus points are Vishnu and entertainment in the second half."
