= Manchu Entertainment =

Manchu Entertainment Private Limited
- Industry: Entertainment
- Founded: Hyderabad
- Founder: Lakshmi Manchu
- Headquarters: Hyderabad, India
- Key people: Lakshmi Manchu
- Products: Films
- Services: Film production Distribution; TV production
- Owner: Lakshmi Manchu
- Parent: Sree Lakshmi Prasanna Pictures
- Subsidiaries: 24 Frames Factory

Manchu Entertainment is an Indian film production company established by Lakshmi Manchu, daughter of actor Mohan Babu.

== Film production ==
Year	Film	Language	Actors	Director	Notes
2012	Uu Kodathara? Ulikki Padathara?	Telugu	Nandamuri Balakrishna, Manoj Manchu, Deeksha Seth, Lakshmi Manchu	Sekhar Raja	
2013	Gundello Godari	Telugu	Aadhi, Sundeep Kishan, Lakshmi Manchu, Taapsee Pannu	Kumar Nagendra	
2015	Dongata	Telugu	Lakshmi Manchu, Adivi Sesh	Vamshi Krishna	

== Film distribution ==
Year	Film	Notes
2012	Uu Kodathara? Ulikki Padathara?	India

== T.V production ==
- Prematho Mee Lakshmi (2011)
