= Mohan Babu University =

University in Andhra Pradesh, India

Coordinates: 13.622°N 79.290°E

- Other name: MBU
- Former name: Sree Vidyanikethan Educational Institutions
- Motto in English: Dream. Believe. Achieve.
- Type: Private University
- Established: 1992; 34 years ago as Sree Vidyanikethan Educational Institutions; January 2022; 4 years ago as MBU
- Accreditation: NAAC; NBA
- Affiliations: UGC, AICTE-CII
- Chancellor: Dr. M. Mohan Babu
- Vice-Chancellor: P. V. Ramana (I/C)
- Location: Sree Sainath Nagar, Tirupati, Andhra Pradesh - 517102. India; ISO 9001:2015 Campus
- Language: English
- Website: mbu.asia

Mohan Babu University is a private university located in Tirupati, Andhra Pradesh. Established in 1992, formerly known as Sree Vidyanikethan Educational Institutions and currently as Mohan Babu University since January 2022, it consists of nine schools, offering academic programs at Undergraduate (UG), Postgraduate (PG), and Ph.D courses in engineering, liberal arts and basic sciences, agricultural, paramedical, commerce, media and film-academy based focused courses.

== History ==
Mohan Babu University (MBU) was established in 1992 with UGC-Colleges with potential for excellence status under the CPE scheme by the UGC, New Delhi, India and also the institution is approved by AICTE.

== Campus ==
Mohan Babu University (MBU) campus is situated in a 100-acre (40 ha) site located beside the Tirupati-Madanapalle national highway 71, and is about 19 kilometers (11.8 mi) from Tirupati bus-stand and 16 kilometers (9.9 mi) from Tirupati railway station and 32.9 kilometers (20.4 mi) from Tirupati Airport, Tirupati district.

== Schools ==
Mohan Babu University (MBU) has nine schools on its campus, which includes the following constituent schools:

- School of Engineering and Technology
- School of Computing
- School of Commerce and Management
- School of Paramedical and Health Sciences
- School of Liberal Arts and Sciences
- School of Art and Design
- School of Agriculture
- School of Media Studies
- School of Film Academy
- Centre For Distance and Online Education

== Rankings ==
The Mohan Babu University (MBU) Institutions participated in the National Institutional Ranking Framework (NIRF) 2022 and secured 165th Rank and also placed in the band excellent in ARIIA (Institute id: ARI-C-26929) rankings 2021 under the Private or Self Financing Technical Institutes category.

== See also ==
- List of institutions of higher education in Andhra Pradesh
- Sree Vidyanikethan Educational Trust
