= Gopimohan =

Indian screenplay and story writer (born 1974)

- Born: Pinnamaneni Gopi Mohan; 1 July 1974 (age 52); Gudivada, India
- Occupations: Screenplay, screenwriter
- Spouse: Praveena
- Writing career
- Pen name: Gopi, Mohan
- Language: Telugu
- Years active: 2001
- Notable works: Nuvvu Nenu, Santosham, Venky, Dhee, Dubai Seenu, Lakshyam, Swagatam, Ready, King, Namo Venkatesa, Dookudu, Baadshah, Loukyam, Dictator, Sarrainodu, Oh Baby
- Height: 5 ft 11 in (1.80 m)

Gopimohan (born Pinnamaneni Gopi Mohan) is an Indian screenplay and story writer who works in the Telugu film industry. Gopi Mohan was born in Kurumaddali village Near Vuyyuru, Krishna District of Andhra Pradesh. From childhood, he was passionate about movies.

== Career ==
Gopi Mohan worked in the direction department for N.Shankar's 1999 Telugu film Yamajathakudu and B. Gopal's 2000 Telugu film Vamsi. He assisted in script and direction for Teja's 2001 Telugu film Nuvvu Nenu.

Later he wrote the screenplay in 2002 Telugu film Santosham. He is associated with successful directors Dasaradh, Sreenu Vytla, Surender Reddy, Teja, G.Nageswara Reddy from past ten years. In the past, he has written screenplays for movies such as Santosham, Venky, Mr & Mrs Sailajakrishnamurthy, Sri, Ashok, Dhee, Dubai Seenu, Lakshyam, Swagatam, Jhummandi Naadam, Dhenikaina Ready, Greeku Veerudu, Doosukeltha, and Loukyam.

He first wrote the story in the 2008 Telugu film Ready. He wrote stories for director Sreenu Vytla films Ready, King, Namo Venkatesa, Dookudu, Baadshah. Gopi Mohan and Kona Venkat worked together for many films as script writers.

== Filmography ==
=== As an assistant director ===
Year	Title
1999	Yamajathakudu
2000	Vamsi
2001	Nuvvu Nenu

=== As screenplay writer ===
Year	Title	Notes and Ref.
2002	Santosham	
2004	Venky	Uncredited
2004	Mr & Mrs Sailajakrishnamurthy	
2005	Sri	
2006	Ashok	
2007	Dhee	
2007	Dubai Seenu	
2007	Lakshyam	
2008	Swagatam	
2010	Jhummandi Naadam	
2012	Dhenikaina Ready	
2013	Greeku Veerudu	
2013	Doosukeltha	
2014	Pandavulu Pandavulu Thummeda	
2014	Alludu Sreenu	
2014	Loukyam	
2016	Dictator	
2016	Shourya	
2019	Oh Baby	

=== As story writer ===
Year	Title	Ref.
2008	Ready	
2008	King	
2010	Namo Venkatesa	
2011	Dookudu	
2013	Shadow	
2013	Baadshah	
2015	Bruce Lee – The Fighter	
2016	Dictator	
2017	Mister	
2024	Dhoom Dham	
