= Dynamite (2015 film) =

Indian action thriller film

- Directed by: Deva Katta
- Written by: Deva Katta; B. V. S. Ravi (dialogue)
- Story by: Anand Shankar
- Based on: Arima Nambi
- Produced by: Vishnu Manchu
- Starring: Vishnu Manchu; Pranitha Subhash; J. D. Chakravarthy
- Cinematography: Satish Mutyala
- Edited by: M. S. Rajashekhar Reddy (S. R. Shekhar)
- Music by: Achu
- Production company: 24 Frames Factory
- Release date: 4 September 2015
- Running time: 142 minutes
- Country: India
- Language: Telugu

Dynamite is a 2015 Indian Telugu-language action thriller film directed by Deva Katta and produced by Manchu Vishnu under the banner 24 Frames Factory featuring himself, Pranitha Subhash, J. D. Chakravarthy in pivotal roles. It is the official remake of the Tamil film Arima Nambi (2014). Katta, however, said that he shot the film for nine days only and walked out due to creative differences. Katta was credited as the film's director nonetheless without his permission.

== Plot ==
The story begins with a girl named Anamika eating golgappas when a rich boy teases a waitress. She is distressed and asks her friends why isn't anyone helping the girl. Then a man named Shivaji, a.k.a. Shiv beats the rich boys. Anamika is impressed and asks the next day she messages him, and his friends compel him to message her for a date. She replies positively, and the two go on their first date. Anamika is impressed by Shiv's modesty. The two then get drunk, and Anamika invites him to her home. At her home, the two are about to kiss when Shiv stops and goes to the bathroom as he is excited. He hears a scream in the room and goes there to see that some goons are taking Anamika away. He follows them but loses track of them when a tanker comes in front of him. He calls the police, who shuns him off, but Swaminath, a sincere police officer, goes with him to Anamika's home where the security guard tells the cops he is lying and Anamika is in Goa for 4 days. They go to Anamika's flat, which is all set, and all the things broken during the fight are fixed. They call Anamika's father, Ranganath Dasari, who happens to be the CEO of news channel 24 and confirms the security guard's statement. Swaminath drops him home and asks him to drink less. He enters his friend's home and takes his bike. He reaches Anamika's father's home and sees the SI and the goons. The SI is alerted that Shiv is present there. They find him and are about to kill him when the Swaminath saves him. They see that Ranganath is being inquired by goons about a memory card in which a party clip is recorded. He says that the chip is with his senior reporter. The goons kill the reporter and get the card from him. The goons also kill Ranganath. A fight ensues between Shiv, the Police inspector, and the goons in which Swaminath dies in the attack.

Shiv then follows the goons and reaches the place where Anamika is held gagged. He also manages to get the chip. They both run with goons behind them. Meanwhile, the leader of the goons, Billu arrives and starts following them. Shiv and Anamika try to open the card, but it requires a password. They go to Ranganath's office to take a diary containing all the passwords. They are still unable to crack the code and thus go to a hotel to hack the code. They are about to open the video when Shiv's friend comes. It slips from his mouth that goons are following him, to which Shiv replies that he never told him about the goons. Shiv's friend reveals that the goons offered him Rs. 1 crore and at the same time, the goons arrive, and Shiv's friend is killed in a shootout. Shiv and Anamika are on the run again. They enter a mall and they come to know that the police are watching them and are on the side of goons on the order of IB minister Rishi Dev who is behind the card. Shiv asks Anamika to gather the media and hand over the card to the governor; meanwhile, he will distract the police. The police discover their location and kill a man who they assume to be Shiv. The police tell the media that Shiv used to supply drugs to Anamika, and they both killed Anamika's father and the police inspector. Meanwhile, an inspector also tells the minister about the video, and Shiv also sees the video when the central minister accidentally kills a model named Neha Sharma as she is pregnant with his child. Shiv copies the video to a pen drive while the minister kills the inspector watching the video. The minister deleted the video and thus not allowing it to be downloaded. Meanwhile, it is revealed that the minister is a candidate for being the Prime Minister. Shiv summons a meeting with the minister, where Shiv tricks him into taking a bag containing the bomb. Shiva, through a distraction, takes the minister on a train. The police are on the run. Shiv starts recording the minister while Anamika sends the link of the video to renowned news channels. Just then, the police force gathered on the spot, and they arrested Shiv. However, the video showing that the minister is saying that he killed Neha Sharma is still being telecast by a button camera which is revealed later. Seeing the video, the high command ordered the police to release Shiv and arrest the minister.

The scene then shifts to Shiv and Anamika giving Rs. 2 crore to Swaminath's daughter for her father's work, and the film ends with the two going to Shiv's home together.

== Cast ==
- Vishnu Manchu as Shivaji Krishna "Shiv"
- Pranitha Subhash as Anamika Dasari
- J. D. Chakravarthy as IB Minister Rishi Dev
- Paruchuri Venkateswara Rao as Ranganath Dasari, Anamika's father
- Yog Japee as Police Commissioner Arun Raj
- Nagineedu as S.I. Swaminath
- Praveen as Shivaji's friend
- Vidyullekha Raman as Shivaji's friend
- Ravi Prakash as C.I.
- Raja Ravindra as Guna
- Prabhas Sreenu as Hotel receptionist
- Viva Harsha as a stranger at a restaurant
- Lekha Washington as Neha Sharma (guest appearance)
- Nataša Stanković as item number "Sayam Anthisthara"

== Production ==
=== Development ===
Kalaipuli S. Thanu sold the Telugu remake rights of his production Arima Nambi to his friend including Telugu actor Mohan Babu after weeks of its release. Mohan Babu's elder son Manchu Vishnu was confirmed to play the male lead while Deva Katta was signed as a director. The film's title however was announced as Dynamite on 1 March 2015.

=== Casting ===
For his role, Vishnu planned to learn freestyle martial arts. He pierced his ears for the role on Deva Katta's request. He also had to sport a long tattoo on his left arm and said that the tattoo gave an edge to his character in the film. Vishnu underwent training in freestyle martial arts at Bangkok from mid-December 2014. Adah Sharma was reported to be the film's female lead in early November 2014. Trisha Choudury was also considered for the female lead role in mid December 2014.

She was reported to play the role of a final-year college student, and regarding her selection, Vishnu said, "We were looking for an actress who can have a classy look and she fits the bill. Her look will be a revelation in the movie. Moreover, this is the first time she's paired opposite me, so I believe that our pairing will look fresh on screen". He also added that Pranitha would join the film's sets in early January 2015.

=== Filming ===
The film's first schedule ended on 26 September 2014. The second schedule began on 1 January 2015. Vishnu wanted to complete the film as quickly as possible. By 1 March 2015, the film reached its final stages of production.

== Soundtrack ==
The audio launch of the movie was organized at Hyderabad on 6 June 2015. Vishnu Manchu's father, actor Mohan Babu, younger brother, actor Manchu Manoj, and director Dasari Narayana Rao were present at the music launch as chief guests. Only three songs were composed for the film.

Dynamite (2015 film)

Soundtrack album by Achu Rajamani
- Released: 6 July 2015
- Recorded: 2015
- Genre: Feature film soundtrack
- Language: Telugu
- Label: Junglee Music
- Producer: Achu Rajamani

Tracklist
No.	Title	Lyrics	Artist(s)	Length
1.	"Charsou Chalees"		Adnan Sami
2.	"Sayam Anthisthara"	Pothula Ravikiran	Geetha Madhuri
3.	"Ulacacharu Ullippaya"	Bhaskarabhatla	Tippu, Geetha Madhuri

== Critical reception ==
Jeevi of Idlebrain rated the film 3/5 and wrote, "Plus points of the film are basic plot, mind play and Manchu Vishnu’s performance. On the flip side, superlative action orientation and lagging screenplay should have been taken care of." Gossip Girl of The Hans India gave it 2.75/5 and wrote, "The film is a remake of a Tamil hit film. But Deva katta has tweaked the original script to suit the taste of Telugu audiences. But he has failed to add commercial elements in the film." Srivathsan Nadadhur of The Hindu wrote, "Dynamite too, has its basic focus set on being pacy, with a lack of any substantial emotion or a novel story. It’s another thing that it doesn’t scale anywhere close to its aspirations." Satish Reddy of Sakshi noted that the film's first half had some annoying scenes, while the second half was engaging.
