= Dongaata (2015 film) =

2015 film

- Theatrical release poster
- Directed by: Vamsy Krishna
- Screenplay by: Vamsy Krishna; Mohan Bharadwaj
- Produced by: Lakshmi Manchu
- Starring: Lakshmi Manchu; Adivi Sesh
- Cinematography: Samalabhasker
- Edited by: M. S. Rajashekhar Reddy (S. R. Shekhar)
- Music by: Satya Mahaveer; Sai Karthik; Raghu Kunche
- Production company: Manchu Entertainment
- Distributed by: Five Elements (Andhra & Ceded)
- Release date: 8 May 2015
- Running time: 139 minutes
- Country: India
- Language: Telugu

Dongaata (transl. Crime Game) is a 2015 Telugu-language crime comedy film, directed by Vamsy Krishna, with the screenplay written by Mohan Bharadwaj and Vamsy Krishna. The dialogues were written by Sai Madhav Burra. It stars Lakshmi Manchu and Adivi Sesh, with Brahmanandam, Madhunandan, and Prabhakar in pivotal roles. The film was released in May 2015 to positive reviews. Manchu produced the film on her Manchu Entertainment banner.

== Plot ==
Venkat (Adivi Sesh) and Vijju (Madhunandan) are protégés of Kattam Raju (Prabhakar). The three goons manage to kidnap actress Shruthi (Manchu Lakshmi) and decide to hide her in an apartment owned by Vijju's boss Brahmi (Brahmanandam). Brahmi lives in the US, but much to the kidnappers' surprise, he arrives as a private detective to solve the kidnapping case. Chaos ensues when Brahmi realizes that Shruthi has been kept at his own house. The kidnappers join him as his servants. After a few small comedy scenes, the trio keeps traveling to the main villain (Kattam Raju), and a fight ensues. After, Shruti says that she told Venkat to kidnap her as she saw her stepmother made a contract with Kattam Raju to kidnap her daughter.

It is then revealed in a flashback that Sruthi is an orphan and Venkat is her best friend. Kattam Raju and Vijju join with them, and they become friends. It is said that Sruthi promised Ragava Rao to give Rs. 100,000,000 to buy back an orphanage within 10 days. Venkat tells Vijju and Kattamraju to go to a room and stay after the money is in their hands. It is later revealed by Vijju that Venkat has dreamed since the youth of going abroad to earn money and stole the money alone, so Venkat gives money to a hawala broker and gets the key note, and stores it in a suitcase in his room. Then Sruthi calls Venkat down and talks to him about his plan of stealing money and going to Dubai.

In a post-credits scene, it is shown that Kattam Raju and Vijju managed to fake his room keys and floor level and installed remote CCTV so as to know his locker passcode and opened and stole it while Venkat was talking to Shruthi. After that, the three people bid a goodbye to him.

== Cast ==
- Lakshmi Manchu as Shruthi
- Adivi Sesh as Venkat
- Brahmanandam as Brahmi
- Madhunandan as Viju
- Prabhakar as Kattam Raju
- Prudhvi Raj as ACP Kanakambaram
- Jaya Prakash Reddy as C.I. Puliraju
- Pragathi as Jyothi
- Narsing Yadav as Baapji
- Ananth as Hotel Manager
- Paruchuri Venkateswara Rao as Elderly friend in Senior Living Home
- Giri Babu as Elderly man in Senior Living Home
- Annapurna as Elderly woman in Senior Living Home
- Prabhas Sreenu

Special appearances in song "Break Up Antu"

- Nagarjuna
- Ravi Teja
- Nani
- Rana Daggubati
- Silambarasan
- Navdeep
- Manoj Manchu
- Sudheer Babu
- Sushanth
- Taapsee Pannu

== Production ==
Vammsi Kreshna, a former assistant director of Gautham Vasudev Menon, had told Lakshmi Manchu the script of Dongaata shortly after joining her production studio as an executive producer. The film, a con-drama, was shot on a tight budget, and actors Adivi Sesh, Brahmanandam and Pragathi were signed to play supporting roles. The film was co-produced by Gandhi.

A song was shot featuring several prominent Telugu actors in cameo appearances, dancing alongside Manchu. The film's soundtrack was released at a ceremony in Hyderabad with the actress Tamannaah as the chief guest.

== Soundtrack ==
Dongaata

Soundtrack album by Sai Karthik Raghu Kunche Satya Mahaveer
- Released: 11 April 2015
- Recorded: 2015
- Genre: Soundtrack
- Length: 16:23
- Label: Manchu Music
- Producers: Sai Karthik; Raghu Kunche; Satya Mahaveer
External audio
- Official Audio Jukebox on YouTube

The music was composed by Sai Karthik, Raghu Kunche and Satya Mahaveer and released on Manchu Music.

Track list
No.	Title	Lyrics	Music	Singer(s)	Length
1.	"Dongaata Title Track"	Varikuppala Yadagiri	Sai Karthik	Sai Karthik	3:07
2.	"Yendiro Yendiro"	Varikuppala Yadagiri	Raghu Kunche	Lakshmi Manchu	4:31
3.	"Breakup Antu"	Ramajogayya Sastry	Satya Mahaveer	L. V. Revanth, Sravana Bhargavi	4:35
4.	"Andharu Andharki"	Ramajogayya Sastry	Satya Mahaveer	Vedala Hemachandra, Pranavi	4:10
Total length:					16:23

== Reception ==
=== Critical reception ===
The film won positive reviews, with Sify.com calling it a "decent movie with some nice thrills despite occasional double meaning dialogues." The critic added that Manchu "is perfect in the role of a rich spoilt movie actress". A reviewer from The Hindu also gave the film a positive review, adding it "starts off on a promising note; ends up being predictable", and that "what works for this comedy thriller though is the fact that it rests on the delicate shoulders of its heroine and does not celebrate the hero. It is an out-and-out Lakshmi Manchu show."
