= Vastadu Naa Raju =

2011 Indian Telugu-language action film by Hemant Madhukar

- Blu Ray Cover
- Directed by: Hemant Madhukar
- Written by: Marudhuri Raja
- Produced by: Vishnu Manchu
- Starring: Vishnu Manchu; Taapsee; Prakash Raj
- Cinematography: S. Gopal Reddy
- Edited by: Gautham Raju
- Music by: Mani Sharma
- Production company: 24 Frames Factory
- Distributed by: 24 Frames Factory
- Release date: 11 February 2011
- Country: India
- Language: Telugu

Vastadu Naa Raju (transl. My King will Arrive) is a 2011 Indian Telugu-language action comedy film directed by Hemant Madhukar. It stars Vishnu Manchu, who also produced the film, and Taapsee in the lead roles. While Gopal Reddy S has handled the camera, the music is composed by Mani Sharma. The film released in February 2011.

== Plot ==
Narasimha (Prakash Raj) is a rowdy whose life ambition is to become an MLA. He murders people and works as a henchman to the Home Minister Aadikeshava Rao (Sayaji Shinde) in hopes of getting the seat. Narasimha has a sister Pooja (Taapsee), whom he adores a lot, and she too loves her brother.

Venky (Vishnu Manchu) is a happy-go-lucky guy with a nice family and no problems. His ambition in life is to become a professional kickboxer. He and his father share a strong bond. When Venky goes to the shop to pick up his pictures, he accidentally takes the wrong envelope. His family sees the pictures of Pooja and thinks she is Venky's girlfriend.

Aadikeshava Rao's son Ajay (Ajay) wants to marry Pooja and tells Narasimha that he will make him an MLA if he agrees to the marriage. Narasimha quickly agrees, and Pooja too has no objection to her brother's decision. Through a series of misunderstandings, Narasimha thinks that Pooja is in love with Venky, though the two have never met. Narasimha worries that if Pooja and Venky choose each other he will not become a MLA and goes to Venky's family's coffee shop and trashes everything. He destroys Venky's sister's marriage and slaps Venky's father. Venky comes home and sees the destruction. He is confused and swears revenge on Narasimha.

Narasimha screams at his sister, and she decides to commit suicide; when she jumps into the water, Venky saves her. As it is late, he decides to drop her at her home. When Narasimha sees Pooja on Venky's bike, he thinks that they are eloping. Venky and Pooja try to explain that they do not know each other and it is a misunderstanding, but Narasimha does not listen. A fight follows. and Narasimha shoots Venky. Venky survives but kidnaps Pooja and demands an apology, and that Narasimha must fix all that he destroyed. Slowly, Pooja becomes friends with Venky, and after a little while they fall in love, but they do not know this. Pooja goes to her exam hall, and tells Venky she will tell him something after her exam. Pooja was going to say that she loves him.

Meanwhile, Venky's friends and family explain the misunderstanding to Narasimha, and he immediately apologizes and fixes all the destruction he has caused. Pooja is not able to tell Venky her feelings because her brother comes and apologizes. Now Venky does not want to create any more problems, so he denies his love for Pooja. Pooja does not want to marry Ajay, but she accepts to make her brother happy. Ajay figures out that Pooja has been kidnapped and thinks that Venky and Pooja are in love. Aadikeshava Rao then insults Pooja. This leads to a fight, and their wedding is called off. Narsimha thinks that Pooja should marry Venky, and they happily get married.

== Cast ==
- Vishnu Manchu as Venkatappa Naidu (Venky)
- Taapsee as Pooja
- Prakash Raj as Narasimha
- Sayaji Shinde as Home Minister Aadikeshava Rao
- Ajay as Ajay
- Sanjay Reddy as Venky's brother
- Sudeepa Pinky as Venky's sister
- Brahmanandam
- Satyam Rajesh as Venky's friend
- Tanikella Bharani as Venky's father
- Rama Prabha
- Pragathi
- Satya Krishnan
- Banerjee
- Jeeva as Narasimha's friend
- Narsing Yadav as Narasimha's friend
- Shiva Reddy as Siva
- Raghunatha Reddy
- Gangadhar Panday as Principal

== Soundtrack ==
Mani Sharma has composed the original score and soundtracks for the film. The audio was released on Mayuri Audio.

Vastadu Naa Raju

Soundtrack album by Mani Sharma
- Released: 2011
- Recorded: 2011
- Genre: Soundtrack
- Length: 32:13
- Label: Mayuri Audio.
- Producer: Mani Sharma

Mani Sharma chronology
Parama Veera Chakra (2011)	Vastadu Naa Raju (2011)	Shakti (2011)

Telugu Track-List
No.	Title	Lyrics	Singer(s)	Length
1.	"Hello Everybody"	Ramajogayya Sastry	Ranjith	4:27
2.	"Padha Padha"	Vennelakanti	Hemachandra, Malavika	4:13
3.	"Sadaymiya"	Vennelakanti	Ranjith, Rita	4:13
4.	"Kalagane Veyla"	Bhaskarabhatla Ravi Kumar	Sreerama Chandra, Saindhavi	4:45
5.	"Olla"	Viswa	Ranjith, Janani	4:45
6.	"Naathone Nuvvu"	Ramajogayya Sastry	Saketh, Saindhavi	5:00
7.	"Yedho Yedho"	Ramajogayya Sastry	Karthik, Chaitra	4:50
Total length:				32:13

Political Rowdy (Tamil Version)

No.	Title	Length
1.	"Chenna Pulla Savatha Pulla"	3:33
2.	"Itho Itho Itho Uillasam"	3:06
3.	"Hello Everybody"	4:24
Total length:		11:03

== Reception ==
Idlebrain wrote "Plus points of the movie are interesting screenplay and entertainment in the second half. On the flip side, The director couldn’t get it right in the first half and climax. On a whole, Vastadu Naa Raju is a decent entertainer with commercial elements packed in it." The film was dubbed in Tamil under the title Political Rowdy and was released on 17 October 2014. The film is dubbed as "Dare Devil" in Hindi.
