= Political Rowdy =

- Poster
- Directed by: Adi
- Written by: Adi; Paruchuri Brothers
- Produced by: Mohan Babu
- Starring: Mohan Babu; Abbas; Charmme Kaur; Prakash Raj; Aishwarya
- Cinematography: Mohan Chand; Amar
- Edited by: Gautham Raju
- Music by: Sandeep Chowta
- Production company: Sree Lakshmi Prasanna Pictures
- Release date: 29 September 2005
- Running time: 155 min
- Country: India
- Language: Telugu

Political Rowdy is a 2005 Indian Telugu-language film directed by Adi Narayana. The film stars Mohan Babu, Charmme Kaur, Prakash Raj, and Abbas. Mohan Babu, apart from starring in a lead role, also produced the film. The film is a remake of the Tamil movie Adi Thadi.

== Plot ==
Vithal (Mohan Babu) is a feared gangster who is unmarried at age 45 due his contempt for women. Kaveri (Charmme Kaur) is a college student who seduces Vithal to the point of him falling in love with her. However, she is in love with another man (Abbas) and only seduced him for fun. When Vithal proposes to her, she accepts out of fear.

== Cast ==
- Mohan Babu as Vithal
- Charmme Kaur as Kaveri
- Abbas as Kartik, Kaveri's boyfriend
- Prakash Raj as Pandu, Vithal's brother
- Kota Srinivasa Rao
- Brahmanandam
- Ali
- Tanikella Bharani as Vithal's uncle
- Venu Madhav
- Raghu Babu as Dasu
- Ahuti Prasad
- Aishwarya as Pandu's wife
- Vizag Prasad
- Sunil as Rohit
- Vishnu Manchu (special appearance in "Telugu Style") as Club Dancer
- Manchu Manoj (special appearance in "Telugu Style") as Club Dancer

== Soundtrack ==
Political Rowdy

Film score by Sandeep Chowta
- Released: 2005
- Recorded: 2005
- Genre: Soundtrack
- Length: 22:49

Sandeep Chowta chronology
Super (2005)	Political Rowdy (2005)	Sri (2005)

The film's music was composed by Sandeep Chowta.

No.	Title	Lyrics	Singer(s)	Length
1.	"Are Pachi Pachiga"	Suddala Ashok Teja	Hariharan	04:46
2.	"L.K.G. Dress"	SAK. Basha Sri	Mano, Sonu Kakkar	03:41
3.	"Vaddura Sodara"	Sahithi	Mano	04:29
4.	"Telugu Style"	Bhuvanachandra	Sandeep Chowta	04:34
5.	"Kallu Therichi Choosha"	Suddala Ashok Teja	Sonu Nigam, Nikita Nigam	5:09
Total length:				22:49
