= Kannappa (film) =

2025 Indian film by Mukesh Kumar Singh

- Theatrical release poster
- Directed by: Mukesh Kumar Singh
- Written by: Vishnu Manchu; Paruchuri Gopala Krishna; G. Eshwar Reddy; G. Nageswara Reddy; Thota Prasad; Akella Shiva Prasad; Mihir Bhuta
- Story by: Vishnu Manchu
- Produced by: Mohan Babu
- Starring: Vishnu Manchu; Preity Mukhundhan; Mohan Babu; R. Sarathkumar; Madhoo
- Cinematography: Sheldon Chau
- Edited by: Anthony
- Music by: Stephen Devassy
- Production companies: AVA Entertainment; 24 Frames Factory
- Release date: 27 June 2025
- Running time: 182 minutes
- Country: India
- Language: Telugu
- Budget: ₹200 crore
- Box office: ₹46 crore

Kannappa is a 2025 Indian Telugu-language epic devotional film directed by Mukesh Kumar Singh, written by Vishnu Manchu, and produced by Mohan Babu. It is based on the legend of Kannappa in Hinduism, a devotee of god Shiva who sacrificed his eyes. The film stars Vishnu Manchu in the title role, with an ensemble cast of Preity Mukhundhan, Mohan Babu, R. Sarathkumar, Madhoo, Mukesh Rishi, Devaraj, Arpit Ranka and Aishwariyaa Bhaskaran alongside Mohanlal, Prabhas, Akshay Kumar and Kajal Agarwal in special cameo appearances.

The film was formally launched on 18 August 2023. Principal photography began on 25 September 2023 in New Zealand. Kannappa was released in theatres worldwide on 27 June 2025. It received mixed to negative reviews from critics, by criticizing the screenplay, incoherent narration, direction, poor execution, VFX, technical issues, misuse of actors, unwanted romantic scenes and pacing. However, the songs and plot received praise, and the film's cast performance received mixed response. The film grossed ₹46 crore worldwide and emerged as a box-office bomb.

== Plot ==
Thinnadu, a gnostic atheist tribal hunter, is exiled after a conflict among his tribe when he openly opposes in the superstitious ritual like human slaughtering occurring in the tribe, spread by a witch named Maremma, which other tribal members believed to be important for the existence of the tribe. Problems arise when Thinnadu brutally thrashes Bebbuli, the son of their tribe's chieftain Mundadu, after Thinnadu gets to know that his intention to molest his girlfriend Nemali, thus Thinnadu's father Nathanathudu kicks Thinnadu and Nemali out of the clan. Then the sacred a divine air-powered Vayulingam is threatened by a group of evil bandits led by evil leader Kala Mukha, in which Nathanathudu was killed, Thinnadu embarks on a soul-stirring quest of faith and courage and finally, leads a war and kills Kala Mukha and his group of evil bandits. Guided by mystical encounters with divine manifestations of Lord Shiva, including Kirata and Rudra, he transcends his mortal limitations. Rudra kills Bebbuli with help of a giant python and spider, after he made a rape attempt on Nemali. In a transcendent climax of devotion, when Thinnadu was thrashed by Mahadeva Sastri, an arrogant high priest, who was hiding Vayulinga from the world as he believed that Vayulinga will became unhygienic when anyone other than him see or touch it. After a fight with Mahadeva Sastri and Bhadragana, Thinnadu selflessly offers his eyes to the Vayulingam, receiving divine forgiveness. Lord Shiva and Goddess Parvati appears, gives Thinnadu his eyes back and emerges Thinnadu as Kannappa, a devotional icon who unites the divided tribes and preserves sacred tradition.

== Cast ==
- Vishnu Manchu in a dual role as
  - Thinnadu / Kannappa, a gnostic atheist hunter and the main protagonist, who later became a devotee of Lord Shiva
    - Avram Bhaktha Manchu as Young Thinnadu
  - Arjuna
- Mohanlal as Kirata, an Avatar of Lord Shiva (special appearance)
- Akshay Kumar as Lord Shiva (special appearance)
- Prabhas as Rudra, a messanger of lord Shiva (special appearance)
- Preity Mukhundhan as Nemali, Thinnadu's wife
- Kajal Aggarwal as Goddess Parvati (special appearance)
- Mohan Babu as Mahadeva Sastri, an arrogant high priest who hides Vayulinga
- R. Sarathkumar as Nathanathudu, Thinnadu's father and the tribal cheiftain
- Madhoo as Pannaga Rani, Nemali's mother
- Mukesh Rishi as Kampadu, Mahadeva Sastri's deputy and leader of Bhadragana
- Brahmaji as Gavvaraju, Kampadu's assistant
- Brahmanandam as Pilaka, a vedic teacher assigned by Pannaga Rani to teach Nemali
- Saptagiri as Gilaka, a vedic teacher assigned by Pannaga Rani to teach Nemali
- Raghu Babu as Mallayya, Thinnadu's paternal uncle and Nathanathudu's brother
- Aishwariyaa Bhaskaran as Maremma, a witch in the tribe, who spreads superstitions among the tribes
- Devaraj as Mundadu, a cheiftain in the tribe
- Lavi Pajni as Bebbuli, Mundadu's son who lusts Nemali
- Satwika Jampa as Shivangi, Thinnadu's cousin
- Deepa Mukhundhan as a tribal lady who lost her son due to Maremma's human slaughtering
- Siva Balaji as Kumara Deva Sastri, Mahadeva Sastri's son
- Arpit Ranka as Kala Mukha, a bandit leader who try to snatch Vayulinga
- Sampath Ram as Chandudu, a cheiftain in the tribe
- Kaushal Prasad Manda as Maali, Thinnadu's childhood friend and Shivangi's boyfriend
- Surekha Vani as Nagamalli, Maremma's daughter
- Ariaana Manchu as a dancer in the song "Sri-Kala-Hasti"
- Viviana Manchu as a dancer in the song "Sri-Kala-Hasti"

== Production ==
=== Development ===
The film, based on the legend of Kannappa—a devotee of god Shiva—took nearly a decade to materialize. In December 2013, actor, screenwriter and director Tanikella Bharani told the media that he was working on the pre-production of a 14th-century period drama film titled Bhaktha Kannappa, with Sunil cast in the title role. In June 2015, actor-producer Vishnu Manchu announced that his production company, 24 Frames Factory, would partner with an American company to produce a film titled Kannappa Katha, with Bharani attached as director. According to reports, Bharani sold his screenplay of Bhaktha Kannappa to Manchu after years of trying to find a producer. Manchu then brought in additional writers to revise and adapt the script as needed. According to Manchu, the decision to move forward with the film was made in January 2023.

Kannappa was officially launched with a pooja ceremony on 18 August 2023 at Srikalahasteeswara temple in Srikalahasti. Mukesh Kumar Singh, known for directing Mahabharat (2013) on Star Plus, was brought on board as the director. The film was produced by Vishnu's father, Mohan Babu, under the companies 24 Frames Factory and AVA Entertainments. At the time of the launch, the story was reported to be developed by Paruchuri Gopala Krishna, Thota Prasad, Sainath Thotapalli, and Sai Madhav Burra. In September, Manchu stated that Parachuri, Thota, Thotapalli, V. Vijayendra Prasad, G. Nageswara Reddy, and G. Eshwar Reddy were "instrumental in developing a script". In the film's first-look poster, Manchu is listed as the writer, while the "story development" credits were attributed to Paruchuri Gopala Krishna, Eshwar Reddy, G. Nageswara Reddy, and Thota Prasad. The story is set in the second century CE. To make the dialogues more accessible to contemporary audiences, Manchu chose to avoid using chaste Telugu dialect.

=== Casting ===
Vishnu Manchu plays the title role of Kannappa, a devotee of god Shiva. In July 2019, reports suggested that Kajal Aggarwal has been cast in the female lead. However, at the film's official launch in August 2023, Nupur Sanon was confirmed for the role instead. She later exited the project in September 2023 due to scheduling conflicts. Preity Mukhundhan was subsequently announced as her replacement, marking her second Telugu film after Om Bheem Bush. The cast also includes Mohan Babu as Mahadeva Shastri, R. Sarathkumar as Nathanathudu, and Madhoo as Pannaga.

In September 2023, Mohanlal and Prabhas were confirmed to appear in undisclosed cameo roles. Nayanthara was reportedly in talks to play Parvathi. But the role eventually went to Aggarwal. Mohanlal and Prabhas were later revealed to be portraying Kirata and Rudra, respectively. According to Manchu, both actors—longtime friends of his family—agreed to join the film out of "love and respect" for his father, Babu, and declined any remuneration for their appearances. Akshay Kumar was cast as Lord Shiva, marking his second portrayal of the god after OMG 2 (2023). Manchu had envisioned Kumar in the role while writing the script, but Kumar initially declined the offer twice. It was only through the liaising of Sudha Kongara, who was directing Kumar in Sarfira at the time, that he agreed to take on the part. He also charged "a lot less than his usual fees".

=== Filming ===
Vishnu Manchu went for location scouting in New Zealand in April 2019. Initially, the crew scouted in Ireland, Scotland, Minnesota, Australia, Switzerland, and Canada in a search for the 2nd century worldbuilding, with unpolluted sky and scenic forests. Principal photography began on 25 September 2023 in New Zealand. Filming was temporarily halted in late October after Vishnu sustained an injury while performing a fight sequence, where the blades of a drone made contact with his arm. In New Zealand, the film was shot in various locations across Auckland, Rotorua, Glenorchy, Wānaka, Pukaki, and Christchurch. Reportedly, about 80 percent of the film will be shot in New Zealand. Brahmanandam completed a 15-day shoot in New Zealand.

The first schedule of filming completed on 23 December 2023, in New Zealand. On 28 February 2024, the production team announced that the second schedule has commenced in New Zealand. Prabhu Deva joined as the dance choreographer. The team then headed to Hyderabad after wrapping up this schedule. Kumar joined the shoot in April, while Prabhas arrived in May. Both their scenes were shot in Ramoji Film City, Hyderabd. With its last schedule in Ramoji Film City, the entire shoot was wrapped up. According to Manchu, most of the VFX footage was used for "godly effects", animal sequences, and in the climax. In a pre-release interview, Manchu remarked that India lacks skilled VFX producers and supervisors, admitting that he felt "embarrassed" by the state of VFX workflow witnessed during production.

== Soundtrack ==
Kannappa

Soundtrack album by Stephen Devassy
- Released: 27 June 2025
- Recorded: 2024–2025
- Genre: Feature film soundtrack
- Length: 44:18
- Language: Telugu
- Label: T-Series
External audio
- Kannappa Full Album – Telugu on YouTube

Stephen Devassy have composed the original score and songs for the film. Suddala Ashok Teja, Ramajogayya Sastry, and Sri Mani were the lyricists for the songs of the film.

No.	Title	Lyrics	Singer(s)	Length
1.	"Sri-Kala-Hasti"	Suddala Ashok Teja	Ariaana Manchu, Viviana Manchu	5:51
2.	"Om Namah Shivaya"	Suddala Ashok Teja	Shankar Mahadevan	2:25
3.	"Akasha Veedhilo" (Composed by Mani Sharma)	Suddala Ashok Teja	Hesham Abdul Wahab, Sahithi Chaganti	5:19
4.	"Hero Clan Entry Song"	Suddala Ashok Teja	L. V. Revanth	1:11
5.	"Heroine Clan Entry Song"	Suddala Ashok Teja	Aruna Mary George	1:01
6.	"Kampadu Clan Entry Song"	Suddala Ashok Teja	Ramki Velagada	1:02
7.	"Mundudu Clan Entry Song"	Suddala Ashok Teja	Kareemullah	1:09
8.	"Chandudu Clan Entry Song"	Suddala Ashok Teja	Shyam Prasad	1:03
9.	"Kirata Bit Song"	Suddala Ashok Teja	Harshavardhan Chavali, Sai Charan Bhaskaruni, Bhavani Rakesh, Pavani Vasa, Aditi Bhavaraju, Nayana Nair	0:44
10.	"Rudra Entry Song"	Suddala Ashok Teja	Deepak Blue	1:17
11.	"Alapana"	–	Aruna Mary George	1:27
12.	"Love Song"	Sri Mani	L. V. Revanth, Sahithi Chaganti	4:14
13.	"Shiva Shiva Shankara"	Ramajogayya Sastry	Vijay Prakash	5:42
14.	"Ye Devudu Kanaledhura"	Suddala Ashok Teja	Shankar Mahadevan	2:52
15.	"Mother Theme"	–	Sindhuja Srinivasa	1:01
16.	"Shiva Theme"	–	Dasari Meghana Naidu, Sai Deva Harsha, Sudarshanam	1:32
17.	"War Song"	Suddala Ashok Teja	Saicharan Bhaskaruni	3:55
18.	"Kannappa Theme"	Instrumental	–	1:08
19.	"Kannappa Theme Music - 2"	Instrumental	–	1:29
Total length:				44:18

== Release ==
The film was originally scheduled to release on 25 April 2025 in Telugu and dubbed versions of Tamil, Kannada, Malayalam, Hindi and English languages, However it was delayed due to VFX enhancement and post-production issues and was later released on 27 June 2025. On 27 May 2025, 24 Frames Factory released an official statement alleging 'Sabotage and personal vendetta', as a hard drive of the film containing footage of action sequence and critical VFX work was stolen during transit.

=== Marketing ===
At Cannes 2024, following their participation in the premiere of Horizon: An American Saga – Chapter 1, the makers unveiled their film's teaser, which received an appreciative round of applause.

=== Home media ===
The film began streaming on Amazon Prime Video from 4 September 2025.

== Reception ==
=== Critical response ===
The film has received mixed to negative reviews from critics and audience, by criticizing the screenplay, incoherent narration, direction, poor execution, VFX, technical issues, misuse of actors, unwanted romantic scenes and pacing. However, the songs and plot received praise, and the film's cast performance received mixed response.

Bollywood Hungama rated the film with three-out-of-five stars and wrote "On the whole, Kannappa triumphs largely due to its mythological appeal and a goosebumps-inducing final 20 minutes.[...] While the film’s lengthy runtime and the relatively low pre-release buzz in the Hindi belt are minor drawbacks, the film holds the potential to surprise, provided it garners strong word of mouth." Paul Nicodemus of The Times of India gave 3/5 stars and wrote "Directed by Mukesh Kumar Singh, Kannappa is a sincere attempt at retelling revered lore with visual grandeur. [...] While the film hits the dramatic notes effectively, some of the emotional layers, particularly around Thinnadu’s inner conflict and relationships, could have been explored with more depth." Kirubhakar Purushothaman of News 18 gave 2.5/5 stars and wrote "While the core story of Kannappa occupies only about one-third of the film’s runtime, the war and the romance take up the rest. There is a lot in Kannappa that echoes SS Rajamouli’s Baahubali. [...] With such decent performances, the film could have relied more on visuals and trimmed down the long monologues that feel like straight lifts from past iterations of the story." Rishil Jogani of Pinkvilla gave 2.5/5 stars and wrote "The devotional tale has a stirring climax but is hampered by a slow first half, weak visual effects, and uneven storytelling. It shall appeal to Shiva devotees but the lacklustre pacing and the shallow subplots will not let the content fly beyond its limited target audience."

Sanjay Ponnappa of India Today gave 2.5/5 stars and wrote "Kannappa falters when it comes to direction, screenplay, and execution. [...] Kannappa has its fair share of drawbacks, but from a devotional perspective, it manages to tap into the right emotions by the end." Swaroop Kodur of The Indian Express gave 2.5/5 stars and wrote "Kannappa remains incoherent for most parts, and the disjointed storytelling leaves a lasting dent in it. If the unimaginative world-building, compounded by some high-level hammy acting, becomes its chief shortcoming then the lack of narrative urgency damages things further." Aditya Devulapally of Cinema Express gave 2/5 stars and wrote "Kannappa is less about Shiva and more about the makers trying very hard to mount a legacy project. [...] What could have been a compelling modern retelling of faith and transformation becomes a bloated star showcase dressed in mythological cosplay." Sangeetha Devi Dundoo of The Hindu wrote "Kannappa had a moving legend to build upon — a tale of unwavering faith and sacrifice. But what it needed was not more star power or visual gloss, but storytelling rooted in emotional clarity and cultural texture. In striving for grandeur, it forgets to tell the story that matters."

=== Box office ===
After eleven days of its release, the film has grossed ₹39.75 crore worldwide.
