= Achu Rajamani =

- Born: Arun; Kozhikode
- Occupations: Music director, singer
- Years active: 2003–present

Arun R, credited as Achu Rajamani, is an Indian film score and soundtrack composer and singer. He has scored music for several Malayalam, Telugu and Tamil films. He made his music direction debut in the Telugu film Nenu Meeku Telusa? in 2008.

== Early life ==
Achu is the grandson of music director B. A. Chidambaranath who is considered to be among the pioneers of the Malayalam music industry. His father, Rajamani, was also a music director and was widely known as the king of background score. Rajamani has scored for more than 1000 films in Tamil, Telugu, Kannada and Malayalam languages. He is a graduate from Loyola College, Chennai.

Hailing from a musical family, Achu's natural interest was to become a pilot. He chose music over aviation and became a full-fledged musician. He also assisted prominent music director M. M. Keeravani for a few years, before he became an independent music composer.

== Career ==
Achu has worked as a keyboard programmer for 410 songs and has programmed background music for over 175 films. He is also a professional pianist and has accompanied his father playing the piano to many of his compositions. He first played keyboard for Bollywood film Chup Chup Ke (2006) directed by Priyadarshan. He was the called upon to score the background music for the Malayalam film Keerthi Chakra's sequel film Kurukshetra (2008). Achu's background music was well appreciated.

Following this short stint, Achu got his major break when he got to compose the songs and background score for the Telugu film Nenu Meeku Telusa? (2008). His next work was for the Telugu remake of the Tamil film Polladhavan, named Kurradu (2009).

Apart from composing, Achu also worked as a playback singer. His song "Take It Easy" for the Malayalam film Happy Husbands composed by M. Jayachandran was among the major hits of 2010.

In 2012, Achu released his first full-fledged Tamil soundtrack for the film Maalai Pozhudhin Mayakathilaey. The album was very well received by critics and received the Album of the Year Award. His Telugu songs Bujji Pilla and Devatha from Potugadu and Padipoya from DK Bose were the biggest hits of 2013. His songs Siru Nadai and Hey Umayaal from the movie Urumeen (2015) were also superhits of the time. His song Pondatti from the movie Golisoda 2 (2018) was in the top list in the radio charts for over 11 weeks since its release in June 2018.

Apart from composing and playback singing Achu was into professional racing from 2009 till 2012. He was also into sports events like sprint and had won numerous medals during his school days. He took a break from films to pursue his racing career from 2009 till 2012. He was also a cricketer and had played for few years. In 2015, he made his debut as an actor with the Telugu film Gaddam Gang.

== Discography ==
=== Composer ===
Year	Title	Language	Songs	Score	Notes
2008	Nenu Meeku Telusa?	Telugu	Yes	Yes	
2009	Kurradu	Telugu	Yes	Yes	
2012	Maalai Pozhudhin Mayakathilaey	Tamil	Yes	Yes	
2013	Sundaattam	Tamil	No	Yes	
2013	Om 3D	Telugu	Yes	Yes	
2013	DK Bose	Telugu	Yes	Yes	
2013	Summa Nachunu Irukku	Tamil	Yes	Yes	
2013	Potugadu	Telugu	Yes	Yes	
2013	Naa Rakumarudu	Telugu	Yes	Yes	
2014	Pandavulu Pandavulu Thummeda	Telugu	Yes	Yes	
2014	Appavin Meesai	Tamil	Yes	Yes	Film unreleased
2014	Ra Ra Krishnayya	Telugu	Yes	Yes	
2014	Current Theega	Telugu	Yes	Yes	
2015	Gaddam Gang	Telugu	Yes	Yes	Also actor
2015	Krishnamma Kalipindi Iddarini	Telugu	Yes	No	1 song
2015	Dynamite	Telugu	Yes	Yes	
2015	Ctrl-c	Telugu	Yes	Yes	
2015	Urumeen	Tamil	Yes	Yes	
2015	Mama Manchu Alludu Kanchu	Telugu	Yes	Yes	
2016	Nandini Nursing Home	Telugu	Yes	Yes	
2017	Luckunnodu	Telugu	Yes	No	1 song
2017	Yaanum Theeyavan	Tamil	Yes	Yes	
2017	Vizhithiru	Tamil	No	Yes	
2017	Puthan Panam	Malayalam	No	Yes	
2017	Venkatapuram	Telugu	Yes	Yes	
2018	Basmati Blues	English/Hindi	Yes	No	1 song ("Rama Hare Krishna")
2018	Goli Soda 2	Tamil	Yes	Yes	
2018	Marainthirunthu Paarkum Marmam Enna	Tamil	Yes	Yes	
2019	Kutty Mama	Malayalam	Yes	Yes	
2019	Kolaiyuthir Kaalam	Tamil	Yes	Yes	
2020	Velvet Nagaram	Tamil	Yes	Yes	
2020	Shadow	Kannada	Yes	Yes	
2020	Puthiya Mugam	Tamil	Yes	Yes	Film unreleased
2020	Yaadhumagi Nindraai	Tamil	Yes	Yes	Film released on ZEE5
2020	Bhanumathi & Ramakrishna	Telugu	Yes	Yes	
2021	Gaali Sampath	Telugu	Yes	Yes	
2022	Virgin Story	Telugu	Yes	Yes	
2022	Urvasivo Rakshasivo	Telugu	Yes	Yes	
2023	Month of Madhu	Telugu	Yes	Yes	
2023	Sooragan	Tamil	Yes	Yes	
2024	Tillu Square	Telugu	Yes	No	1 song
2024	Mazhai Pidikkatha Manithan	Tamil	Yes	No	1 song ("Aham Brahmasmi")
2025	Jack	Telugu	Yes	No	
2025	Gajaana	Tamil	Yes	Yes	
2025	Chiranjeeva	Telugu	Yes	Yes	
2025	Kumaara Sambavam †	Tamil	Yes	Yes	

=== As singer ===
- Aakasame Haddu (2011)
- Puthumugangal Thevai (2012)
- Naadodigal 2 (2020)
