= Dhee (film) =

2007 Indian film by Srinu Vaitla

- Film poster
- Directed by: Srinu Vaitla
- Written by: Kona Venkat (Dialogue)
- Screenplay by: Srinu Vaitla
- Story by: Kona Venkat; Additional Story: Gopimohan
- Produced by: Mallidi Satyanarayana Reddy
- Starring: Vishnu Manchu; Genelia; Srihari; Brahmanandam; Jai Akash
- Cinematography: Prasad Murella
- Edited by: Marthand K. Venkatesh
- Music by: Chakri
- Production company: Siri Venkateswara Films
- Release date: 13 April 2007
- Country: India
- Language: Telugu
- Box office: ₹11 crore distributors' share

Dhee (lit. 'Clash') (alternatively spelled as Dee) is a 2007 Indian Telugu-language action comedy film directed by Srinu Vaitla and produced by Siri Venkateswara Films. The film stars Vishnu Manchu and Genelia while Srihari and Brahmanandam play supporting roles.

The film was remade into Oriya as Tu Mo Girlfriend (2011), in Bengali as Khokababu (2012) and in Tamil as Mirattal (2012). A sequel titled D and D: Double Dose has been announced in 2020. The film won two Nandi Awards. Nani worked as an assistant director in this film before making his acting debut two years later in Ashta Chamma. The film was also dubbed and released in Hindi as Sabse Badi Hera Pheri.

== Plot ==
Srinivas "Babloo" Rao (Vishnu Manchu) is a happy-go-lucky guy who likes to have fun with his friends and always gets into trouble. Because of this, his father Narayana Rao (Chandra Mohan) gets him a job with Shankar Goud (Srihari), a local mafia head don leader. Shankar and Ballu (Supreeth), a dreaded local goon, are rivals, and Ballu is determined to kill Shankar's sister Pooja (Genelia D'Souza) to avenge his son's (Ajay) death because he murdered the couple, and now he is killed by Shankar. Babloo falls in love with Pooja, but Shankar is planning an arranged marriage for her with Ajay (Jai Akash), an NRI doctor. Babloo and Pooja elope to get married, and Babloo later saves Pooja from Ballu. The rest of the story tells how Babloo marries Pooja and how Shankar finishes Ballu to protect his sister.

In the end, Shankar lets Ajay marry another girl, and Ajay agrees and goes back to the USA. When Shankar finds out that Babloo and Pooja are falling in love with each other, Shankar and his henchmen badly beat Babloo. Srirangam Sheshadri Chary (Brahmanandam), one of Shankar's employees, calls Narayana and tells him that Shankar is trying to kill Babloo. Narayana comes and tells the goons to let Babloo go. One of Shankar's henchmen, who is also his right hand (Brahmaji), cheats him. Shankar fires Babloo and tells him to never come back because he thinks that Babloo and Pooja fell in love with each other. On the way to the wedding, one of Ballu's henchmen blocks five cars of Shankar's henchmen, and now Shankar, Pooja, and Brahmaji are trapped. When Ballu and his henchmen are there, Brahmaji gives Shankar a gun to shoot him, and he does. However, the gun does not have bullets, and Shankar is shocked to see that Brahmaji has been working for Ballu all along. Ballu tricks Shankar, and according to his plan, he planned to handover Shankar & pooja. Shankar, in a fit of rage, kills almost all of Ballu's henchmen, including Brahmaji, but he is brutally injured, and Ballu finally kidnaps Pooja.

Chary knows about this and tells Babloo that Shankar is injured and Pooja is abducted by Ballu. Ballu calls Shankar on the phone and tells them that he will kill Pooja if he couldn’t find a way to rescue pooja in three hours. Shankar tells Babloo that Babloo could marry Pooja if he kills all of Ballu's henchmen, to which he agrees. Shankar and Babloo find out that Pooja is held captive in an almost abandoned building. Babloo fights Ballu's henchmen, while Shankar fights Ballu. Shankar finally defeats Ballu. The film ends with Shankar letting Pooja marry Babloo and them doing so. Pooja also gives birth to a first child.

== Cast ==
- Manchu Vishnu as Srinivas "Babloo" Rao
- Genelia as Pooja Goud (Voice dubbed by Savitha Reddy)
- Srihari as Shankar Goud
- Bramhanandam as Srirangam Sheshadri Chary
- Chandra Mohan as Narayana Rao, Babloo's father
- Akash as Ajay
- Supreeth as Ballu, Shankar Goud's rival
- Ajay as Ballu's brother
- Sunil as Katthi
- Santhoshi as Kumari
- Delhi Rajeswari as Babloo's mother
- Chatrapathi Sekhar as Shankar Goud's henchman
- Suma Kanakala as Shankar Goud's henchman's wife
- Brahmaji as Shankar Goud's right-hand who is revealed to be Ballu's henchmen
- Tanikella Bharani as Corporator Krishna, Ballu's brother-in-law
- Jaya Prakash Reddy as Pedhanarayana, Shankar and Pooja's uncle
- Prema as Shankar Goud's wife
- Shafi as a Professional Killer
- Srinivasa Reddy as Babloo's friend
- Chitram Srinu as Babloo's friend
- Bharath Raju as Ballu's henchmen
- Master Bharath as Mani Ratnam
- Prudhvi Raj as Rowdy
- Vajja Venkata Giridhar as Police officer

== Soundtrack ==
No.	Title	Singer(s)	Length
1.	"Kanupapa Edhi"	Chakri, Suda
2.	"Thodasa Ullasam"	Venu, Revathi
3.	"Kikku Ledura"	Ranjith
4.	"Jathara"
5.	"Em Maayo Maayo"	Chakri, Suchitra
6.	"Koncham Koncham"	Chakri, Kousalya
7.	"Mirchi Mirchi"

== Reception ==
Jeevi of Idlebrain.com wrote that "On a whole, Dhee is an entertaining film". A critic from Rediff.com wrote that "Dhee is worth your money".

== Sequel ==
Director Vaitla announced the sequel of the film with Vishnu reprising his character in November 2020. The film is titled as D and D: Double Dose.

== Awards ==
Nandi Awards - 2007

- Best Screenplay Writer - Sreenu Vaitla
- Best Fight Master - Ram-Lakshman
