= Denikaina Ready =

- Movie poster
- Directed by: G. Nageswara Reddy
- Screenplay by: Gopimohan; Kona Venkat
- Story by: B. V. S. Ravi; Udayakrishnan; Sibi K. Thomas
- Based on: Udayapuram Sulthan (Malayalam)
- Produced by: Mohan Babu
- Starring: Vishnu Manchu; Hansika Motwani
- Narrated by: Prabhas
- Cinematography: Siddharth Ramaswamy
- Edited by: M. R. Varma
- Music by: Songs: Chakri; Yuvan Shankar Raja; Score: Chinna
- Production company: 24 Frames Factory
- Distributed by: 24 Frames Factory
- Release date: 24 October 2012
- Running time: 139 minutes
- Country: India
- Language: Telugu

Denikaina Ready (transl. Ready for anything) is a 2012 Indian Telugu-language action comedy film directed by G. Nageswara Reddy and produced by Mohan Babu. The film features Vishnu Manchu and Hansika Motwani in the lead roles. The film is a remake of the Malayalam film Udayapuram Sulthan. It was a commercial success at the box office. The film was remade in Bengali as Khiladi (2013).

== Plot ==
Veera Narasimha Naidu (Prabhu) is a faction leader in Kurnool, who raises his sister Saraswati (Seetha) with love and affection to make her forget the loss of their mother. Around the time of marriage, she elopes with Basha (Suman), whom she loves, which leads to the death of their father. Thus enraged, Narasimha Naidu cuts Basha's leg, which creates a rift between the two families. In a case to win the property belonging to Saraswati, Basha wins the case against Narasimha Naidu after a long 25 years. Seeing the sorrow of Saraswati, her son Sulaiman (Vishnu Manchu) vows to unite the two families and waits for a situation.

Meanwhile, on a suggestion by Sampangi Sastry (M. S. Narayana), Narasimha Naidu appoints his man Bangarraju (Brahmanandam) to find a great scholar to perform a Mahachandi Yagam. He contacts Agnihotra Narasimha Sastry (Amanchi Venkata Subrahmanyam) but as he is unavailable, he goes to the college where Krishna Sastry (Samrat Reddy), the son of Narasimha Sastry studies. Krishna Sastry, in a fit of rage (as his love interest Aparna is close to Sulaiman), shows Sulaiman to Bangarraju and tells him that he is Krishna Sastry, but prefers to be called Sulaiman. Though reluctant initially to accept, Sulaiman accepts that he is Krishna Sastry as this would be a golden chance to unite the two families. He, along with his friend David (Vennela Kishore) and a group of Brahmins (Played by Dharmavarapu Subramanyam, Master Bharath, Raghava, Kadambari Kiran, Ananth and others) goes to the palace of Narasimha Naidu.

There he manages to act well, only to be noticed by Sharmila (Hansika Motwani), daughter of Narasimha Naidu. Though she tries to screen his true colors, he escapes by his wit and timing. In an unexpected turn of events, Bangarraju visits Krishna Sastry's home to pay Sambhavana, but shockingly finds out the truth that Sulaiman is acting as Krishna Sastry. Fearing for his life, he discloses the facts and wants the Yagam to be completed as soon as possible. Sulaiman, though interested in Sharmila, considers his mother's wish very important and starts plotting various plans to intimate feelings on Saraswati in Narasimha Naidu's heart, but all goes in vain. Meanwhile, Narasimha Naidu's opponent Rudrama Naidu (Kota Srinivasa Rao) attacks Sharmila and Sulaiman saves her. Sharmila falls for him and Narasimha feels that the attack was done by Basha.

Things get worse for Sulaiman as Aparna, (Bangarraju's daughter and Krisha's lover) returns to the palace, proposes to him and warns him that if he refuses to reciprocate the feelings, she would reveal the secret. Meanwhile, Sampangi Sastry, who is in deep frustration as Bangarraju did not allow him perform the Yagam, wants to take revenge. Sulaiman plays a very clever game to hide his skin playing with the weaknesses of everyone. Everything goes smooth until Sharmila tells about her proposal of marriage with Krishna Sastry to her dad and her dad sends his brothers to talk with Krishna's Parents. Sulaiman reveals his identity to Sharmila and sets to Krishna Sastry's House. There too he plays a game with the weaknesses of Krishna Sastry's mother so that she would refer to Sulaiman as her son before Narasimha Naidu's brothers. Things get on the right path and marriage planning activities are done in full swing.

Rudrama Naidu's son wants to marry Sharmila so that he can torture her to the core. This plan disturbs him and Rudrama Naidu threatens Narasimha Sastry to leave her or else his son Krishna Sastry would be killed. Thus Narasimha Sastry summons Krishna Sastry and finds out that he neither loves Sharmila nor performed the Yagam. Sulaiman enters the scene, plays a game again, forces Narasimha Sastry to misrepresent Sulaiman as Krishna Sastry at that place. Sulaiman makes Narasimha Naidu to invite Saraswati for the marriage and Basha says that he would come to the marriage only for Sharmila. Thus when the family along with Sulaiman visit the temple, Rudrama Naidu attacks Narasimha Naidu's family and Sulaiman makes a call to Basha that he is attacked. Basha reaches there with his men and in an emotional juncture, he saves Narasimha's family and Narasimha saves Saraswati. After learning the truth that Sulaiman acted as Krishna Sastry, he asks about the reason for the fraud and Sulaiman tells him that it was to unite the two families. Thus the two families unite and Sulaiman marries Sharmila.

== Cast ==
- Vishnu Manchu as Sulaiman / Krishna Sastry
- Hansika Motwani as Sharmila
- Brahmanandam as Bangaraju
- Prabhu as Veera Narasimha Naidu
- Aishwarya Gorak as Aparna
- Suman as Basha
- Kota Srinivasa Rao as Rudrama Naidu
- Dharmavarapu Subramanyam as Malinga Sastry
- Vennela Kishore as David
- M. S. Narayana as Sampangi Sastry
- Subbaraju as Veera Narasimha Naidu's brother
- Nagineedu as Veera Narasimha Naidu's father
- Seetha as Saraswathi
- AVS as Narasimha Sastry
- Master Bharath as Raghulingam Sastry
- Ravi Prakash as Veera Narasimha Naidu's brother
- Samrat Reddy as Krishna Sastry
- Pragathi
- Satyam Rajesh
- Raghu Babu
- Chalapathi Rao as ACP K. Divakar
- L. B. Sriram
- Prabhas (voiceover) for Vishnu Manchu

== Production ==
=== Filming ===
Director G. Nageswara Reddy shot this film in Malaysia, Bangkok, and Andhra Pradesh, amongst other places.

=== Controversy ===
Based on a local court's directive, the Malkajgiri police booked cases against actors M. Mohan Babu, M. Vishnu, and director G. Nageswar Reddy for portraying Brahmins in a poor light. A student from Malkajgiri, G. Pavan Kumar, filed a petition in the court urging it to direct police to book cases against the producer, director and lead actors of Denikaina Ready for insulting the Brahmin community. Writer of the movie BVS Ravi has given a public apology through ABN channel for hurting the Brahmin community unintentionally.

== Soundtrack ==
Denikaina Ready

Soundtrack album by Chakri and Yuvan Shankar Raja
- Released: 28 September 2012
- Genre: Feature film soundtrack
- Length: 25:20
- Language: Telugu
- Label: Aditya Music
- Producer: Mohan Babu

Chakri chronology
Naa Ishtam (2012)	Denikaina Ready (2012)	Srimannarayana (2012)

Yuvan Shankar Raja chronology
Billa II (2012)	Denikaina Ready (2012)	Aadhi Bhagavan (2012)

The audio album of the film has been composed by Chakri and Yuvan Shankar Raja. The soundtrack features five tracks that belong to varied genres including a parody. The audio album was released on 28 September at the lavish Gandharva Mahal set erected for the film Uu Kodathara? Ulikki Padathara?.

Track listing
No.	Title	Lyrics	Music	Singer(s)	Length
1.	"Naalage Nenuntanu"	Ramajogayya Sastry	Yuvan Shankar Raja	Shankar Mahadevan
2.	"Pillandham Keka Keka"	Chandrabose	Chakri	Vedala Hemachandra, Parinika
3.	"Ninnu Choodakunda"	Bhaskara Bhatla	Chakri	Adnan Sami, Geetha Madhuri
4.	"Pilla Neevalla"	Anantha Sreeram	Yuvan Shankar Raja	Yuvan Shankar Raja, Shrraddha Pandit
5.	"Panche Kattuko"	Bhaskara Bhatla	Chakri	Tippu, Sravana Bhargavi

== Critical reception ==
Jeevi of idlebrain.com gave a review of 3.25/5 stating "Denikaina Ready is a comedy film with an underlying sentiment. The Interval twist is interesting. The director has succeeded in creating a typical Priyadarshan type of satire of mistaken identities. The plus points of the film are Vishnu - Brahmanandam comedy. On the flip side, the story depends on the clichéd aspect of Rayalaseema faction wars. On a whole, Denikaina Ready has enough ingredients to work at the box office. Super Good Movies gave a review of rating 3/5 stating "A Good Entertainer from Vishnu, Brahmanandam Combination. You must watch." Sify.com gave a review of rating 3/5 stating "Denikaina Ready is a time pass flick. Although it runs with formula comedy scenes, it also has some genuine comedy sequences and the film moves on with regular doses of laughs."

== Awards ==
Ceremony	Category	Nominee	Result
2nd South Indian International Movie Awards	SIIMA Award for Best Comedian (Telugu)	Master Bharath	Nominated

== Home media ==
This film is available for streaming on Sun NXT and Jiocinema.
