= Pandavulu Pandavulu Tummeda =

Pandavulu Pandavulu Tummada
- Movie poster
- Directed by: Sriwass
- Screenplay by: Kona Venkat; Gopimohan
- Story by: B. V. S. Ravi
- Produced by: Vishnu Manchu; Manoj Manchu
- Starring: Vishnu Manchu; Manoj Manchu; Varun Sandesh; Tanish; Pranitha Subhash; Hansika Motwani; Raveena Tandon; Mohan Babu
- Cinematography: M. R. Palani Kumar
- Edited by: M. R. Varma
- Music by: Achu Rajamani; Bappi Lahiri
- Production companies: 24 Frames Factory; Sree Lakshmi Prasanna Pictures
- Distributed by: 24 Frames Factory (worldwide)
- Release date: 31 January 2014
- Running time: 156 mins
- Country: India
- Language: Telugu
- Budget: ₹15 crore

Pandavulu Pandavulu Tummeda (transl. Five Pandavas are now Nine) is a 2014 Indian Telugu-language comedy drama film directed by Sriwass and featuring an ensemble cast composed of Vishnu Manchu, Manoj Manchu, Varun Sandesh, Tanish, Pranitha Subhash, Hansika Motwani, Raveena Tandon, and Mohan Babu. Manchu Vishnu and Manchu Manoj are jointly producing the film on their respective banners, 24 Frames Factory and Sri Lakshmi Prasanna Pictures. Kona Venkat, Gopimohan and BVS Ravi wrote the film's screenplay with Palani Kumar handling cinematography.

The film is partly inspired by the Hindi movie Golmaal 3. The movie also marks the return of Mohan Babu on film after a long self-imposed hiatus, sharing the screen with both his sons Vishnu and Manoj for the first time. Raveena Tandon also returned to Telugu cinema after a long hiatus with this film. The soundtrack and music on the film were composed by Bappa Lahiri and Achu. Released worldwide on 31 January 2014, the film featured Brahmanandam, Mukesh Rishi, Raghu Babu, Vennela Kishore, Supreeth Reddy, M. S. Narayana in other pivotal roles. Upon release, the film received a positive reception from critics and it was successful at both the Indian and overseas box offices.

== Plot ==
In the Andhra Pradesh-Karnataka border, there are two villages named Pandavapuram and Kauravapuram. Dharmanna is the head of Pandavapuram and is considered as the latest descendant of the Pandavas, while Suyodhana is the head of Kauravapuram and also is considered as the latest descendant of the Kauravas. As expected, Dharmanna is a good Samaritan while Suyodhana is a dangerous criminal who runs a quarry business. Similar to the tale of Mahabharata, here in this film too, Dharmanna and Suyodhana play the game of cards in which Suyodhana fails, which makes him follow the stipulation of the game - no celebration, marriage, and any good events should not be conducted for 14 years. This leaves Suyodhana swearing vengeance and exactly after 14 years, by manipulation, Suyodhana wins the game and asks Dharmanna to give his daughter's hand with his youngest son's marriage. Thus to ensure his daughter Honey's safety, Dharmanna sends her to Bangkok along with his friend and his friend's daughter. There she stays with Satya's family and starts working with her sons Vijay and Gopal in a successful boat business.

On a separate note, Naidu is a tourist guide in Bangkok, and his three sons Ajay, Varun, and Lucky are cons. Naidu, who is disciplined, punishes them for their misdeeds. On the other hand, Vijay turns into a very short-tempered man if one raises a finger towards him and always, in any case, Vijay keeps on breaking those fingers pointing him. Gopal stutters, while Lucky is a dumb person. While Vijay and Gopal emotionally blackmail Satya that they would have been happy if their father was there, Ajay, Varun and Lucky would emotionally blackmail Naidu that they would have been happy if their mother was there as she would support them and defend Naidu. Including Honey, only Naidu and Satya knew that the five men are orphans and Naidu and Satya sacrificed their love to raise them and still remained unmarried as their marriage was put on hold during their young days by Satya's father Subba Rao as Naidu was a poor man then. Honey somehow manages to unite them and get them married, and she makes arrangements to bring all the five men under one roof. Satya's sons and Naidu's sons often quarrel, until they realise they are orphans. They conceal the fact before their new parents that they knew about their identity in order not to hurt them. Vijay is in love with Honey, and when Honey is going to propose to him, Suyodhana's son-in-law Siddha reaches Bangkok along with his men and forcibly takes her back to Kauravapuram in India.

The new family learns about the game of cards, its stipulations, and consequences from Dharmanna's friend, which makes Naidu promise Dharmanna that he would bring Honey back to Pandavapuram without any violence. Thus with reference to the Virata Parva of Mahabharata, the whole family enters Suyodhana's house in disguise. First, Naidu and Varun enter into the good books of Suyodhana's elder sons Guna and Gana and then enter the house as Graharaja, a powerful astrologer and Upagraharaja, his assistant. Satya, Lucky, and Gopal enter the house as Satya Menon, a Malayali cook, and her assistants. Vijay makes an entry as Gambler Gopi, a skilled gambler and fan of Suyodhana. Meanwhile, Suyodhana's brother-in-law Bapure, a Telugu freak and over a suspicious person, and his westernized daughter Kuchala Kumari alias KuKu, whom Bapure wishes to turn into a traditional Telugu girl. Finally, Ajay makes an entry in a female attire as Mohini, Gambler Gopi's sister-in-law who loves Gopi. Ajay in the disguise of Mohini makes Guna, Gana, and Honey's would-be Gaja fall for her charms, and KuKu, who knows Mohini's real identity is in mutual love with Ajay. Though Bapure is fond of commenting and complaining about people, Graharaja fixes him in such a situation that if he does it, he would die the next moment. On the day of the marriage of Honey and Gaja, Mohini creates a brawl between the three brothers and fakes her death.

In order to escape from the clutches of Mohini's brother Mohan, a police officer, Graharaja advises to Suyodhana to conduct the marriage of Gopi and Honey so that Mohan, who is a police officer would punish Gopi for Mohini's death. Mohan turns out to be Ajay in a police uniform and since Suyodhana's family does not know about Ajay's identity, they remain silent. The marriage is conducted and after the rituals get completed, the drama is exposed to Suyodhana's family by Guna as he finds out that the corpse of Mohini thrown in the well was a doll. Naidu is shot with a gun by Suyodhana at Naidu's arm which makes the five furious. A riot happens in which Naidu and his sons emerge victorious. Finally, Bapure is forced to accept the marriage of Ajay and KuKu after he learns the truth since the couple is in love.

== Cast ==
- Vishnu Manchu as Vijay / Gambler Gopi
- Manoj Manchu as Ajay / Mohini / Mohan
- Varun Sandesh as Prem / UpaGraha Raj
- Tanish as Lucky
- Pranitha Subhash as Kuchela Kumari (Kuku)
- Hansika Motwani as Honey
- Raveena Tandon as Sathya
- Mohan Babu as Naidu / Graha Raju
- Vennela Kishore as Gopal
- Brahmanandam as Pichakuntla Paidithalli (Bapure)
- Ali as Dolly Bhai
- Dasari Narayana Rao as Subbu
- M. S. Narayana as Mastan
- Mukesh Rishi as Suryodhana
- Giri Babu as Dharmanna
- Chandra Mohan as Narayana
- Raghu Babu as Siddha
- Supreeth Reddy as Guna
- Y. Kasi Viswanath as Honey's uncle
- Bharani as Gana
- Shravan as Gaja
- Gurleen Chopra
- Thagubothu Ramesh
- Krishna Bhagawan
- Telangana Shakuntala
- Alekhya Varma

== Production ==
The film was officially launched on 23 April 2013 in Hyderabad and the launch event was graced by Dasari Narayana Rao, Lavanya Tripathi, BVS Ravi, Gopi Mohan and Kona Venkat.

=== Filming ===
Manchu Vishnu and Hansika Motwani paired up to film the first song of the movie in some landscapes and locations in Italy during the month of May in 2013.

Manoj plays three different characters in the movie and teams up with Pranitha, who plays a boisterous, fun-loving girl. She finished a brief shooting schedule in Slovenia during the same month.

Raveena Tandon, previously starring in Bangaru Bullodu, Ratha Sarathi, and Akasa Veedhilo, marks her return to the Telugu Film Industry after twelve years. She pairs up with industry veteran Dr. Mohan Babu. The pair had also finished shooting a song in Venice.

Pandavulu Pandavulu Tummeda brings landscapes from Europe including Germany, Austria, Italy, Slovenia among others. The film also features some backdrops from Bangkok.

== Box office ==
The film was released on 31 January, earning approximately ₹ 11.50 crores nett in India and about ₹ 1.06 crores nett ($1,70,000) overseas.

== Soundtrack ==
The soundtrack of the film was composed by Achu Rajamani and Bappi Lahiri. Lyrics of songs were written by Bhaskara Batla, Chandrabose and Anantha Sriram. The audio launch of the film held at the Shilpa Kala Vedika in Shilparamam, Hyderabad on 11 January 2014. Music Mania rated the soundtrack 2.5/5 and stated that the title song is better than all but that no song is worth noting.

Track listing
No.	Title	Artist(s)	Length
1.	"Pandavulu Pandavulu Tummeda"	Baba Sehgal	02:23
2.	"Guchi Guchi Nuvvu Chudakala"	Adnan Sami, Shreya Ghoshal	04:10
3.	"Chusa Nene"	Udit Narayan	04:50
4.	"Saturday Night"	Hemachandra, Charu Semvai, Jonitha	03:57
5.	"Sathemma Sathemma"	Shreya Ghoshal, Mano	03:56
6.	"Burra Girra Girra"	Achu Rajamani, Ranjitha, Srilekha Parthasarathy	03:51
Total length:			23:09

== Home media ==
This film is now available on Aha Video and Disney+Hotstar platforms
