= Supreeth Reddy =

Indian actor

Supreeth
- Other name: Supreeth Reddy
- Occupation: Actor
- Years active: 2002–present
- Height: 193 cm (6 ft 4 in)
- Spouse: Priyanka
- Children: 2

Supreeth Reddy is an Indian actor who primarily acts in Telugu-language films. He is known for his roles in films like Chatrapathi and Maryada Ramanna. He played villain and supporting roles.

He also acted in the Hindi film Rowdy Rathore, a remake of the Telugu film Vikramarkudu. He also played one of the baddies in Aamir Khan's Ghajini.

== Career ==
He was interested in films from his childhood. He was also a volleyball player in his childhood. He missed the auditions for the film Jayam. Later he was advised by director Teja to maintain an album. He acted in Pawan Kalyan's directorial debut Johnny. For the sports film Sye, directed by S. S. Rajamouli, he was trained in Rugby.

He was first selected in playing a friend of Prabhas in Chatrapathi, but his role was changed to Katraj, a villain, later. This got him a lot of name and fame, which, after that, he was typecast in many villainous roles in Telugu films. Though he got opportunities as a hero, he did not accept them. Personally, he likes the acting style of Mohan Babu and Kota Srinivasa Rao.

== Personal life ==
Supreeth is married to Priyanka and they have two sons.

== Filmography ==
Key
†	Denotes films that have not yet been released

=== Telugu films ===
Year	Film	Role	Notes
2002	Jayam		
2003	Johnny		
2004	Andhrawala		
2004	Sye	Bhikshu Yadav's henchman	
2005	Chhatrapati	Katraju	
2006	Ashok	Panda	
2006	Stalin	Malli	
2007	Dhee	Ballu	
2007	Sri Mahalakshmi		
2007	Dubai Seenu		
2007	Toss		
2007	Don	Bihar rowdy	
2008	Victory	Pandu	
2008	Ontari	Veeraraju	
2008	Ready	Narasimha	
2008	Bujjigadu	Machi Reddy's son	
2008	Nenu Meeku Telusa?		
2008	Neninthe	Yaadu	
2009	Billa	Ranjit	
2009	Sankham	Simha Gajapati Naidu	
2009	Bumper Offer	Mallikharjun	
2010	Adhurs	Pandu	
2010	Bindaas		
2010	Ragada	Bhagawan	
2010	Maryada Ramanna	Malla Suri	
2010	Brindavanam		
2011	Boss	Chotta Bhai	Kannada film
2011	Mirapakay	Linga	
2011	Dongala Mutha	The Hotel Manager	
2011	Prema Kavali	Tagore's henchman	
2011	Dookudu	Ambarpet Ganesh	
2011	Rajanna	Jagjit	
2012	Ishq	Kala	
2012	Nippu	Raja Goud's henchman	
2012	Srimannarayana	Pulakesava Reddy	
2012	Rebel	Raju	
2013	Mirchi	Karimulla	
2013	Shadow	Robert	
2013	Pandavulu Pandavulu Thummeda	Guna	
2013	Greeku Veerudu		
2013	Balupu	Poorna's henchman	
2013	Chandee	Minister's accomplice	
2013	Bhai		
2013	Baadshah	Rakhi Rasul	
2014	Yevadu	Bhukka	
2014	Bhimavaram Bullodu		
2015	Jil	Ghora	
2016	Express Raja	Binami British	
2016	Eedo Rakam Aado Rakam	Dattu	
2016	Sarrainodu	Vairam Dhanush's henchman	
2016	Jaguar	"Encounter" Shankar	
2017	Lanka	Officer Srinivas	
2017	Juliet Lover of Idiot		
2018	Gayatri	Kader	
2018	Achari America Yatra	Veeraraju	
2019	Voter	Prakash	
2019	Saaho	Alex	
2024	Saripodhaa Sanivaaram	Kaali	
2025	Mazaka		
2026	The RajaSaab	Thief	
2026	Gaayapadda Simham	Goon	

=== Tamil films ===
Year	Film	Role	Notes
2007	Veerappu	Thilla	
2011	Siruthai	Bhadra	
2016	Uyire Uyire	Uncredited role	
2024	Vettaiyan	Hanu Reddy	
2026	Karuppu	Lawyer	

=== Hindi films ===
Year	Film	Role
2008	Ghajini	Ghajini's henchman
2012	Rowdy Rathore	Titla
2019	Saaho	Alex
