= Kona Venkat =

Indian screenwriter

- Kona Venkat in September 2014 at Loukyam pre-release event
- Born: 19 February 1965 (age 61); Bapatla, Andhra Pradesh, India
- Citizenship: India
- Education: University of Pune
- Occupations: Screenwriter, film producer
- Years active: 1998–present
- Relatives: Kona Prabhakara Rao (Grand Father); Neeraja Kona (cousin)

Kona Venkat (born 19 February 1965) is an Indian screenwriter and producer known for his works in Telugu and Hindi cinema. He is known for his works in box office hits such as Alludu Seenu, Amma Nanna O Tamila Ammayi, Baadshah, Dookudu, Adhurs, Ready, Dhee, Venky, Geethanjali, Happy, Samba, Ninnu Kori and Jai Lava Kusa and has recently completed 50 films and 20 years in the film industry.

== Filmography ==
=== As a writer ===
Year	Title	Writer	Notes
1998	Satya	Dialogue	Telugu dubbed version
1998	Prematho	Dialogue	
1999	Yevaru	Dialogue	
1999	Mast	Dialogue	Telugu dubbed version
2000	Jungle	Dialogue	Telugu dubbed version
2002	Company	Dialogue	Telugu dubbed version
2003	Okariki Okaru	Story, dialogue	
2003	Amma Nanna O Tamila Ammayi	Dialogue	
2003	Ninne Istapaddanu	Screenplay, dialogue	
2003	Sivamani	Dialogue	
2004	Venky	Dialogue	
2004	Samba	Dialogue	
2004	Gayab	Yes	Hindi Film
2005	Balu	Dialogue	
2005	Bhageeratha	Dialogue	
2006	Chukkallo Chandrudu	Screenplay, dialogue	
2006	Happy	Dialogue	
2006	Shock	Story, dialogue	
2007	Dhee	Story, dialogue	
2008	Ready	Story, dialogue	
2008	Chintakayala Ravi	Yes	
2008	King	Story	
2010	Adhurs	Story	
2010	Don Seenu	Screenplay, dialogue	
2011	Dookudu	Dialogue	
2012	Denikaina Ready	Screenplay	
2013	Baadshah	Yes	
2013	Shadow	Yes	
2013	Balupu	Story	
2013	Pandavulu Pandavulu Thummeda	Screenplay	
2014	Alludu Seenu	Dialogue	
2014	Geethanjali	Screenplay, dialogue	
2014	Power	Dialogue	
2014	Loukyam	Screenplay	
2015	Pandaga Chesko	Screenplay	
2015	Akhil	Dialogue	
2015	Bruce Lee	Story	
2015	Soukhyam	Screenplay	
2015	Shankarabharanam	Yes	
2016	Dictator	Yes	
2016	Abhinetri	Dialogue	
2017	Mom	Story	Hindi Film
2017	Ninnu Kori	Screenplay	
2017	Jai Lava Kusa	Screenplay	
2020	Nishabdham	Screenplay	
2022	Ginna	Yes	
2023	Waltair Veerayya	Yes	
2024	Geethanjali Malli Vachindi	Yes	

"'Geethanjali' will remain as a milestone in the career of Anjali as 'Arundhati' for Anushka and 'Chandramukhi' for Jyothika. The film will have unexpected twists and turns. It is a very different film from all the horror thrillers which have come till now."

— Kona Venkat

=== As producer ===
He established the production company Kona Film Corporation and produced several films.

- Thoka Leni Pitta (1997)
- Nishabdham (2020)
- Gully Rowdy (2021)
- Geethanjali Malli Vachindi (2024)
- Band Melam (2026)

=== As distributor ===
- Geethanjali (2014)
- Shankarabharanam (2015)
- Abhinetri (2016)
- Sahasam Swasaga Sagipo (2016)
- Ninnu Kori (2017)
- Neevevaro (2018)

=== As director ===
His debut directional film was shelved and unreleased because of unknown reasons.

- Naan Aval Adhu (2008; Tamil)

=== As actor ===
- Endukante Premanta
- Vanaveera

== Awards ==
- Santosham Film Awards: Best Writer(2008) for the movie Ready
