= Sree Vidyanikethan Educational Trust =

Indian educational and research institute

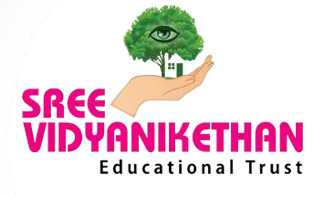
- School logo
- Motto: स्वदेशो भुवनत्रयम
- Motto in English: The triple world (Earth, sky and heaven) is one's own place.
- Type: Educational and Research institute
- Established: 1993
- Chairman: Mohan Babu
- Academic staff: More than 350
- Students: More than 10,000
- Location: Tirupati, Andhra Pradesh, India
- Campus: Urban, 240 acres (0.96 km2)
- Website: www.vidyanikethan.edu

The Sree Vidyanikethan Educational Trust, also referred to as SVET, was established in 1993 by Dr. M. Mohan Babu. who has been an actor, film producer, recipient of Padma Shri Award and former member of Rajya Sabha. The college is located 14 kilometres (8.7 mi) from Tirupati in the state of Andhra Pradesh, India. Under its aegis, SVET has several educational institutions across different disciplines.

Sree Vidyanikethan Engineering College was established in 1996 with an initial intake of 180 students to serve the cause of technical education in the backward region of Rayalaseema. The intake has increased exponentially and is 2382 in 2021-22. The College now offers 15 B.Tech programs; 4 M.Tech programs; MCA Program; and 3 Doctoral Programs. AICTE has also accorded permission for 2nd Shift Polytechnic from the academic year 2009-10 and presently 5 Diploma courses are being offered. Today, Sree Vidyanikethan Engineering College is one of the largest, most admired and sought after Institutions in Andhra Pradesh. The College is located in a sprawling campus of about 30 acres, amidst sylvan surroundings with aesthetically built infrastructure. The College is approved by AICTE and affiliated to JNTU Ananthapuramu. The College has been accorded Autonomous Status by the UGC, New Delhi since 2010-11.

== History ==
During the 1960s, Dr. M. Mohan Babu inherited a passion for learning from his father, Narayana Swamy Naidu, who was a teacher and headmaster in the Tirupati district of Andhra Pradesh. He established SVET as a center for knowledge and academic excellence for people of all nationalities, origin, religious beliefs and social background. From a student strength of 216 it has grown to become an institution with nearly 10,000, students, five colleges and two international schools and one pre-school. The trust's institutions have a cumulative full-time faculty of over 350, starting off with 10. SVET is the largest private institution in the Rayalaseema region and operates in collaboration with the Governments of India and Andhra Pradesh.

== SVET institutions ==
Institutions under Sree Vidyanikethan Educational Trust: The SVET caters to various disciplines of education, with the following being the colleges and schools under its fold.

Institution	Course	Year founded	Accreditation	Affiliation
Sree Vidyanikethan International School Tirupati	International school	1993	CBSE, IGCSE	Andhra Pradesh state board
Sree Vidyanikethan International School Hyderabad	International school	1997	CBSE	Telangana state board
Sree Vidyanikethan Degree College	Degree	1996	AICTE, NAAC	S.V. University
Sree Vidyanikethan Engineering College	Engineering	1996	AICTE, NAAC	JNTU Anantapur
Sree Vidyanikethan College of Pharmacy	Pharmacy	2004	AICTE	JNTU Anantapur
Sree Vidyanikethan College of Nursing	Nursing	2006	AP Nursing Council	Dr. NTR University
Sree Vidyanikethan Institute of Management	MBA	2007	AICTE	S.V. University
Sree Vidyanikethan Institute of Management	MCA	2009	AICTE	S.V. University and JNTU Anantapur
New York Academy	K-12	2016	-	American Curriculum(WACS)

== Logo of Sree Vidyanikethan Educational Trust ==
The logo of Sree Vidyanikethan Educational Trust is referred to as The Tree of Enlightenment.

== Campus Infrastructure ==
SVET offers dining, environmental services, housing, mail, scholarships, student employment, a resource centre, television, transportation, work-study information and copying facilities. Sports at the school include cricket, volleyball, football, basketball and tennis. A technical, management and cultural festival, Mohana Mantra, was held from 22 to 24 February 2013.

== Placement and Training ==
Sree Vidyanikethan has a placement cell that connects the individual to the industry and service organizations to update prospective employers of the talent available and secure commitments for placements.

== Mohana Mantra ==
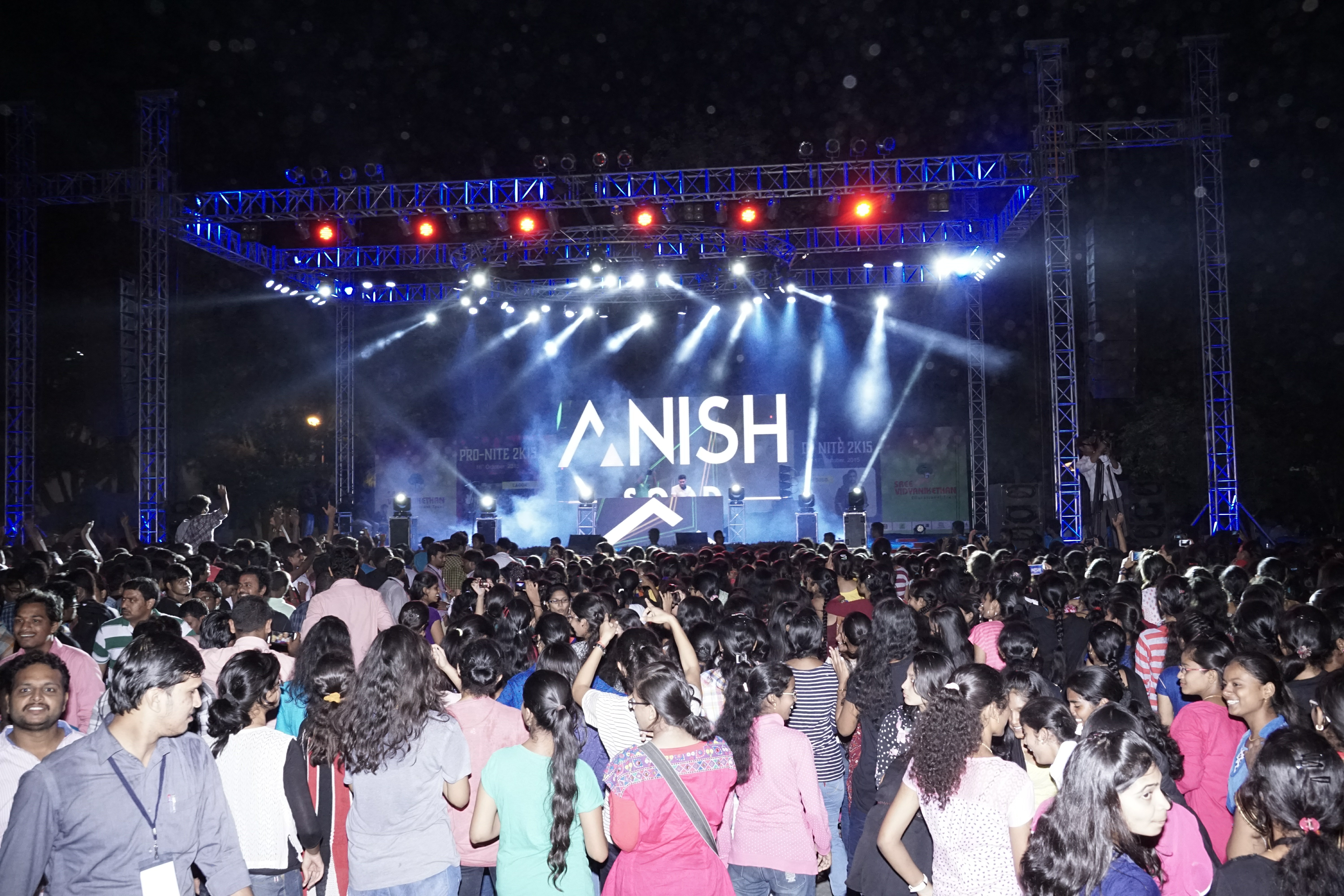

Mohana Mantra is the annual National Level Techno-Cultural fest hosted by Vidyanikethan. It includes contests and competitions, presentations, workshops, tech and non-tech quizzes, Sahiti Mantra, guest lectures, robotics, sport events, dance, singing, drama, painting and lot more. It has students from Sree Vidyanikethan and other institutions as well, who come together to showcase their talent, giving a glimpse into their future. It started in 2013 as an inter-college fest and has grown into a stage where pride is contested for, by about 50,000 students from across southern states, for 3 rewarding and fun-filled days. Website URL of the fest: http://www.mohanamantra.com/

== Dr. M. Mohan Babu Startup Fund ==
The Dr.M. Mohan Babu Startup Fund was set up in 2016 with a reward base of Rs. 1 crore. Dr. Mohan Babu has taken his commitment further by increasing the funding amount progressively for deserving ideas; to Rs. 2 crore in 2017, Rs. 3 crore in 2018, Rs. 4 crore in 2019 and Rs. 5 crore in 2020. Sree Vidyanikethan is the first education institute to come up with such an initiative.

== Financial Support ==
Sree Vidyanikethan Educational Trust has a web portal for alumni, where they can donate towards education of the less privileged. It provides free education to 25% of its deserving students and invites the less-privileged to apply for financial support and almost 13,500 students have benefited from this initiative.

== Library ==
SVET has a bibliography that comprises close to 69,000 titles, encompassing a range of periodicals like newspapers, magazines, fiction, literature, science and many more books of interest. The library is also complemented by computers with Internet access which students are free to use for any kind of research.

== Scholarships ==
Sree Vidyanikethan Educational Trust supports students by way of scholarships. These are majorly from the OBC, SC and ST communities.

== Alumni ==
There is an alumni association of those who have passed out from any of the Trust's institutions, The SVET Office of Development and Alumni Relations. In the past 25 years, SVET has grown into an alma mater for over 25,000 students from various streams.

== Extracurricular activities ==
Students of Vidyanikethan are part of rich Extracurricular activities that are designed to keep their mind, body and spirit in balance. The school has regular sessions in yoga and meditation. That aside, there are moonlight dinners, field trips and backpacking trips. For those interested in sports, there are activities intra-school competitions in Cricket, Tennis, Chess, Badminton, Rugby and several other activities.

== Annual Day ==
The birthday of the founder of the trust Dr. M. Mohan Babu is celebrated as Annual Day on 19 March every year. A pompous celebration is hosted to which with parents and celebrities are invited amidst events organized by students, teachers and members of the staff. It's a gala event that one remembers for long.
