= Mohan Babu filmography =

Indian Telugu Actor

Mohan Babu
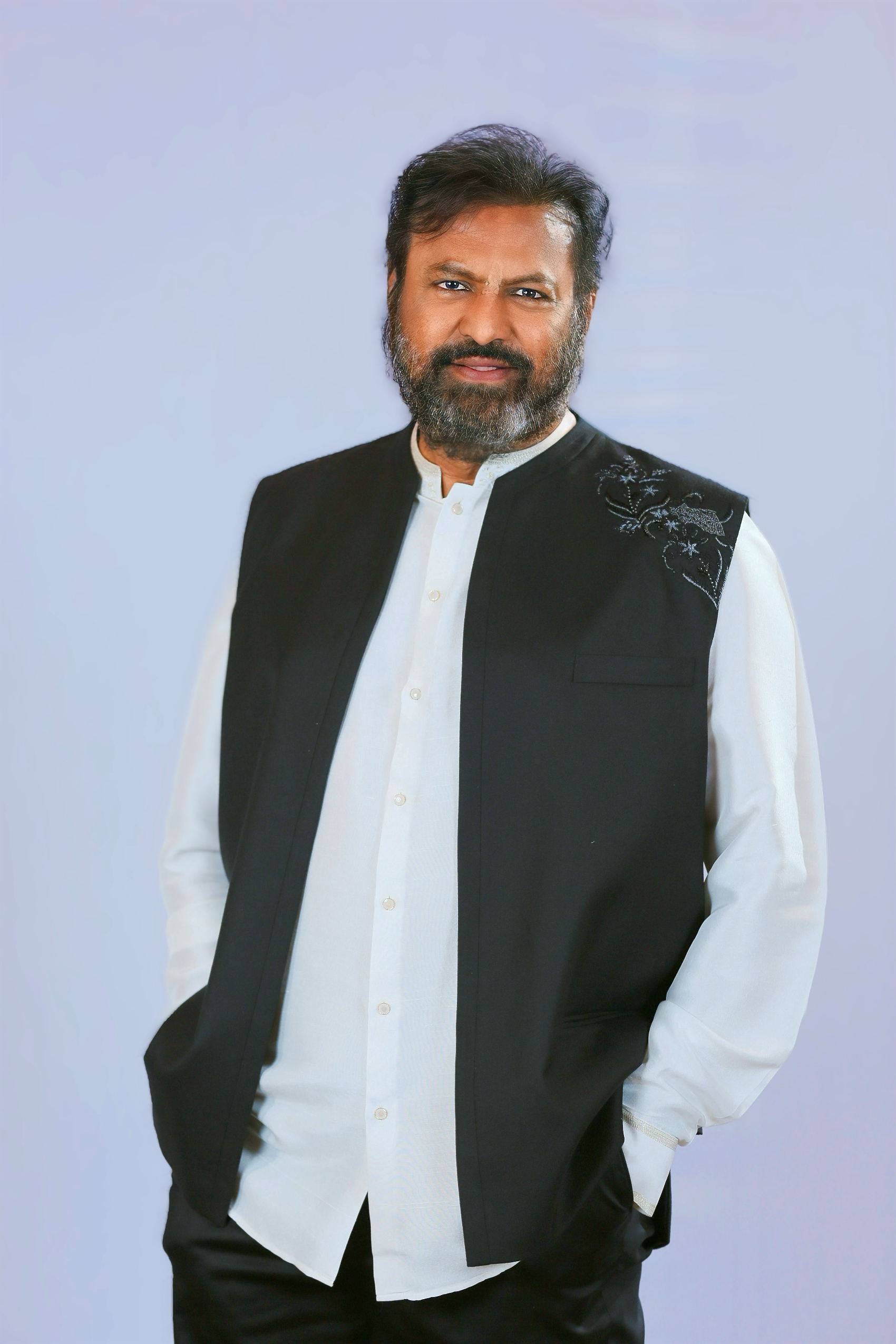
- Mohan Babu at 'V M Office' in Hyderabad

Mohan Babu is an Indian actor and producer who works predominantly in Telugu cinema. He also acted in Tamil cinema.

Born on March 19, 1952, in Modhugulapalem, Andhra Pradesh, India, Manchu Mohan Babu is a distinguished Indian actor, producer, and politician with a career spanning numerous decades. He has made substantial contributions to the Indian film industry, notably in the Telugu cinema.

In addition to his film career, Mohan Babu has engaged in politics and undertaken various social initiatives. His family includes several members who are actively involved in the film industry as well.

The following is the filmography of Indian actor and producer Mohan Babu.

== Filmography ==
=== Telugu films ===
Key
| † | Denotes films that have not yet been released |

| Year | Title | Role | Notes |
|---|---|---|---|
| 1974 | Alluri Seetarama Raju | | |
| 1974 | Kannavaari Kalalu | | |
| 1975 | Swargam Narakam | Rajesh | |
| 1976 | Bhale Dongalu | Ranga | |
| 1976 | Athavarillu | | |
| 1976 | O Manishi Thirigi Chudu | | |
| 1977 | Ardhangi | | |
| 1977 | Jeevana Teeralu | Pottu Raju | |
| 1977 | Manushulu Chesina Dongalu | | |
| 1977 | Bangaru Bommalu | | |
| 1977 | Bhale Alludu | | |
| 1977 | Dongalaku Donga | Thufan | |
| 1977 | Khaidi Kalidasu | Thufan | |
| 1977 | Kurukshetram | Sisupala | |
| 1977 | Tholireyi Gadichindi | | |
| 1978 | Chal Mohana Ranga | | |
| 1978 | Pottelu Punnamma | Hari Babu | |
| 1978 | Dongala Dopidi | Jaggadu | |
| 1978 | Gorantha Deepam | | |
| 1978 | Kalanthakulu | | |
| 1978 | Kumara Raja | | |
| 1978 | Mugguru Muggure | Raju | |
| 1978 | Nayudu Bava | Suryam | |
| 1978 | Padaharella Vayasu | Simhachalam | |
| 1978 | Rama Krishnulu | Thyagaraju | |
| 1978 | Simha Baludu | Gajapathi | |
| 1978 | Simha Gharjane | | |
| 1978 | Sivaranjani | Mohan | |
| 1978 | Vichitra Jeevitham | Surendra Nath | |
| 1979 | Shri Rama Bantu | Nagaraju | |
| 1979 | Kotta Alludu | | |
| 1979 | Andadu Aagadu | Bhujangam | |
| 1979 | Driver Ramudu | Kamal Babu | |
| 1979 | Kalyani | Raja Rao | |
| 1979 | Captain Krishna | | |
| 1979 | Dongaluku Saval | Sundaram | |
| 1979 | Maavuri Devatha | | |
| 1979 | Nindu Noorellu | | |
| 1979 | Rama Banam | | |
| 1979 | Ravanude Ramudayithe? | Poolaiah | |
| 1979 | Rangoon Rowdy | Babu | |
| 1979 | Shokilla Rayudu | | |
| 1979 | Amma Evarikaina Amma | Raja | |
| 1980 | Kottapeta Rowdy | Vaikuntham | |
| 1980 | Bhale Krishnudu | | |
| 1980 | Buchi Babu | V.P. Rao | |
| 1980 | Chesina Basalu | | |
| 1980 | Circus Ramudu | Sambaiah | |
| 1980 | Deeparadhana | Mohan | |
| 1980 | Dharma Chakram | | |
| 1980 | Gandhara Golam | | |
| 1980 | Gharana Donga | Kishore Kumar | |
| 1980 | Gopala Rao Gari Ammayi | | |
| 1980 | Guru | Ramesh | |
| 1980 | Kaksha | | |
| 1980 | Ketugadu | | |
| 1980 | Mahalakshmi | Rudraiah | |
| 1980 | Manavude Mahaneeyudu | | |
| 1980 | Paalu Neelu | | |
| 1980 | Pilla Zamindar | | |
| 1980 | Prema Kanuka | Mohan | |
| 1980 | Ragile Hrudayalu | Mohan | |
| 1980 | Sarada Ramudu | | |
| 1980 | Sardar Papa Rayudu | | |
| 1980 | Sita Ramulu | Ravi | |
| 1980 | Sujatha | | |
| 1980 | Pelli Gola | Ranga Raju | |
| 1980 | Trilok Sundari | | |
| 1981 | Kirayi Rowdylu | Koti | |
| 1981 | Chattaniki Kallu Levu | | |
| 1981 | Addala Meda | | |
| 1981 | Prema Simhasanam | Kalyan | |
| 1981 | Aggi Ravva | Inspector Suryam | |
| 1981 | Dabbu Dabbu Dabbu | | |
| 1981 | Kondaveeti Simham | Ravi | |
| 1981 | Patalam Pandu | | |
| 1981 | Premabhishekam | Dr. Chakravarthy | |
| 1981 | Satyam Shivam | | |
| 1981 | Taxi Driver | Mohan | |
| 1982 | Billa Ranga | Ranga & Rajaram (Dual role) | |
| 1982 | Patnam Vachina Pativrathalu | | |
| 1982 | Prathigna | Bharat | Also producer |
| 1982 | Gruha Pravesam | | |
| 1982 | Chandamama | | |
| 1982 | Devatha | Kamesham | |
| 1982 | Jayasudha | | |
| 1982 | Kotha Neeru | | |
| 1982 | Bangaru Koduku | Ramesh | |
| 1982 | Pralaya Rudrudu | 'Mangalavaram' Malligadu | |
| 1982 | Prathikaram | Rangadu | |
| 1982 | Sawaal | | |
| 1983 | Dharma Poratam | Mohan | Also producer |
| 1983 | Moogavani Paga | Nagaraju/Ashok Raj | |
| 1983 | Durga Devi | | |
| 1983 | Kala Yamudu | | |
| 1983 | Kurukshetramlo Seeta | | |
| 1983 | Maro Maya Bazaar | | |
| 1983 | Mayagadu | | |
| 1983 | Palletoori Pidugu | | |
| 1983 | Police Venkataswamy | | |
| 1983 | Pralaya Garjanai | | |
| 1983 | Rangula Puli | | |
| 1984 | Bhale Ramudu | | Also producer |
| 1984 | Ee Thirpu Illalidhi | | |
| 1984 | Srimathi Kaavali | | |
| 1984 | Padmavyuham | | Also producer |
| 1984 | Aada Puli | | |
| 1984 | Grihalakshmi | | |
| 1984 | Rowdy | | |
| 1984 | Sardar | | |
| 1984 | Seethamma Pelli | | |
| 1985 | Adavi Donga | | |
| 1985 | Vintha Mogudu | | |
| 1985 | Edadugula Bandham | | Also producer |
| 1985 | Illaliko Pariksha | | |
| 1985 | Maa Inti Mahalakshmi | Mohan Kumar | |
| 1985 | Kalyana Thilakam | | |
| 1985 | Kothapelli Kuthuru | | |
| 1985 | Maro Monagadu | | |
| 1985 | Nerasthudu | Nagaraju | |
| 1985 | Ragile Gundelu | | Also producer |
| 1985 | Sanchalanam | | |
| 1985 | Tirugubatu | | |
| 1986 | Maanavudu Daanavudu | | Also producer |
| 1986 | Kondaveeti Raja | | |
| 1986 | Nampalli Nagu | | |
| 1986 | Papikondalu | | Also director and writer |
| 1986 | Tandra Paparayudu | Vijaya Ramaraju | |
| 1986 | Ugra Narasimham | | |
| 1987 | Srinivasa Kalyanam | Bokka Lambodharam | |
| 1987 | Chakravarthy | Mohan Rao | |
| 1987 | Sardar Dharmanna | | |
| 1987 | Veera Prathap | | Also producer |
| 1987 | Krishna Leela | | |
| 1987 | Nene Raju Nene Manthri | | |
| 1987 | Viswanatha Nayakudu | | |
| 1988 | Dorakani Donga | Cobra and Sisupal | |
| 1988 | Yuddha Bhoomi | | |
| 1988 | Janaki Ramudu | Balavantha Rao | |
| 1988 | Khaidi No. 786 | SI Asirayya | |
| 1988 | Murali Krishnudu | Parasuram | |
| 1988 | Manchi Donga | | |
| 1988 | Atmakatha | | |
| 1988 | Brahma Puthrudu | Ranjeeth | |
| 1988 | Chinababu | Sunnam Chinna Rao | |
| 1988 | Donga Ramudu | | |
| 1988 | Intinti Bhagavatham | | |
| 1988 | Praja Pratinidhi | Dasakantha Rao | |
| 1988 | Varasudochadu | Ambaji Rao | |
| 1988 | Kaliyuga Karnudu | Adiseshu | |
| 1989 | Lankeswarudu | | |
| 1989 | Bhale Donga | Manmadha Rao | |
| 1989 | Vijay | Puligolla Pasupathi | |
| 1989 | Agni | | |
| 1989 | Bala Gopaludu | Govinda Babu | |
| 1989 | Black Tiger | | |
| 1989 | [Dhruva Nakshatram | | |
| 1989 | Koduku Diddina Kapuram | | |
| 1989 | Naa Mogudu Nanke Sontham | | Also producer |
| 1989 | Two Town Rowdy | Baba Sab | |
| 1989 | Ontari Poratam | Sivangi Sivaramakrishma | |
| 1990 | Kodama Simham | Sudigaali | |
| 1990 | Kondaveeti Donga | | |
| 1990 | Maa Inti Katha | | Also producer |
| 1990 | Yama Dharmaraju | | |
| 1990 | Alludugaru | Vishnu | Also producer |
| 1990 | Kadapa Reddamma | | |
| 1990 | Prananiki Pranam | Rasool | |
| 1990 | Prema Yuddham | Jayasimha | |
| 1991 | Rowdy Gari Pellam | Rambabu | Also producer |
| 1991 | Agni Nakshatram | | |
| 1991 | Coolie No. 1 | Gopal | |
| 1991 | Assembly Rowdy | Shivaji | Also producer |
| 1991 | Alludu Diddina Kapuram | Jaganatham | |
| 1991 | Peddintalludu | Goodala Kanna Rao | |
| 1991 | Prema Panjaram | | |
| 1992 | Brahma | Ravi Varma | Also producer |
| 1992 | Allari Mogudu | Gopal | |
| 1992 | Donga Police | Rambabu | |
| 1992 | Detective Narada | Naarada | |
| 1992 | Samrat Ashoka | Malavasimha Rudradeva | |
| 1993 | Kunti Puthrudu | Rambabu | Also producer |
| 1993 | Chittemma Mogudu | Sai Krishna | |
| 1993 | Major Chandrakanth | Shivaji | Also producer |
| 1993 | Rowdy Mogudu | Kaali | |
| 1994 | Allari Police | Venkata Ramana & Ashok (Dual role) | Also producer |
| 1994 | Punya Bhoomi Naa Desam | Bharath | Also producer |
| 1994 | M. Dharmaraju M.A. | M Dharmaraju & Satyam (Dual role) | |
| 1995 | Pedarayudu | Pedarayudu & Raja (Dual role) | Also producer |
| 1996 | Adirindi Alludu | Gopal | |
| 1996 | Soggadi Pellam | Rambabu | |
| 1997 | Adavilo Anna | Shivaji | Also producer |
| 1997 | Veedevadandi Babu | Sriram | |
| 1997 | Annamayya | Saluva Narasimha | |
| 1997 | Collector Garu | Rambabu | Also producer |
| 1998 | Raayudu | Rayudu | Also producer |
| 1998 | Khaidi Garu | Raju | Also producer |
| 1999 | Sri Ramulayya | Ramulayya | |
| 1999 | Yamajathakudu | Shivaji | Also producer |
| 2000 | Postman | Vishnu | Also producer |
| 2000 | Rayalaseema Ramanna Chowdary | Ramanna | Also producer |
| 2001 | Adhipathi | Yogendra alias Yogi | Also producer |
| 2002 | Tappu Chesi Pappu Koodu | Shivaji | Also producer Also sang a song: "Intannadantannade Gangaraju" |
| 2002 | Kondaveeti Simhasanam | Satti | |
| 2004 | Suryam | Himself | Also producer Special appearance |
| 2004 | Shiva Shankar | Shiv Shankar / Sivaji | Also producer |
| 2005 | Sri | Basavadu | Special appearance |
| 2005 | Political Rowdy | Panduranga Vithal | Also producer |
| 2006 | Game | Pandit Raghava | Also producer |
| 2007 | Yamadonga | Yamadharmaraju | |
| 2008 | Pandurangadu | Muneeswarudu | |
| 2008 | Bujjigadu | Shivanna | |
| 2008 | Krishnarjuna | Baba | Also producer Cameo appearance |
| 2009 | Saleem | Ozo alias Ogirala Jogaiah | |
| 2009 | Raju Maharaju | Chakravarthy | |
| 2009 | Mestri | | Special appearance |
| 2010 | Jhummandi Naadam | Captain Rao | |
| 2013 | Jagadguru Adi Shankara | Rudraksha Rushi | |
| 2014 | Pandavulu Pandavulu Tummeda | Naidu / Graha Raju | |
| 2014 | Rowdy | Anna Garu | |
| 2014 | A day in the life of Lakshmi Manchu's feet | Himself | Short film |
| 2014 | Yamaleela 2 | Yama Dharma Raja | |
| 2015 | Mama Manchu Alludu Kanchu | Bhaktavatsalam Naidu | |
| 2017 | Luckunnodu | Himself | Special appearance |
| 2018 | Mahanati | S. V. Ranga Rao | Special appearance |
| 2018 | Gayatri | Dasari Sivaji & Gayatri Patel | Also producer; dual role |
| 2022 | Son of India | Virupaksha | Also screenplay writer |
| 2023 | Shaakuntalam | Durvasa Maharishi | |
| 2025 | Kannappa | Mahadeva Sastry | Also producer & Special appearance |
| 2025 | Daksha: The Deadly Conspiracy | Dr. Viswamitra | Also Producer |
| 2026 | Srinivasa Mangapuram | Venkatappaya Naidu | |
| 2026 | The Paradise | Shikanja Maalik | |

=== Other language films ===
| Year | Title | Role | Language | Notes |
|---|---|---|---|---|
| 1977 | Annan Oru Koyil | Baskar | Tamil | |
| 1978 | Thai Meethu Sathiyam | Johnny | Tamil | |
| 1979 | Annai Oru Aalayam | Mohan | Tamil | |
| 1979 | Vetrikku Oruvan | Madhan | Tamil | |
| 1980 | Natchathiram | | Tamil | |
| 1980 | Ratha Paasam | Raj | Tamil | |
| 1980 | Guru | Ramesh | Tamil | |
| 1981 | Garjanai | | Tamil | Uncredited role |
| 1981 | Sneham Oru Pravaaham | | Malayalam | |
| 2020 | Soorarai Pottru | M. Bhaktavatsalam Naidu | Tamil | Amazon Prime Video film |

=== As a producer ===
This is a list of films that he produced that he did not act in.

- Vishnu (2003)
- Raju Bhai (2007)
- Denikaina Ready (2012)
- Doosukeltha (2013)

== See also ==
- List of Indian actors
- Telugu cinema
