= List of Telugu films of 1980 =

This is a list of films produced by the Tollywood (Telugu language film industry) based in Hyderabad in the year 1980.

Title	Director	Cast	Production studio
Aarani Mantalu	K. Vasu	Chiranjeevi, Kavitha, Subhashini	T. V. Films
Aatagadu	T. Rama Rao	N. T. Rama Rao, Sridevi, Jaggayya, Rao Gopal Rao	Venkateshwara Movie Creations
Adadhee Gadapa Datithe	B. S. Narayana	Rajendra Prasad	Sri Srinivasa Padmavathi Productions
Adrushtavanthudu	G. C. Shekar	Krishna, Akkineni Nageshwara Rao, Sridevi	
Agni Samskaram	G. V. Prabhakar	Chiranjeevi	Sri Sharada Enterprises
Alayam	D. Madhusudhana	Nagesh, Sharada	
Alludu Pattina Bharatam	K. Vishwanath	Krishnam Raju, Jaya Prada, Kavitha, Nagabhushanam	D. V. S. Productions
Bebbuli	V. Madhusudhana Rao	Krishnam Raju, Sujatha	
Bhale Krishnudu	K. Raghavendra Rao	Krishna, Jaya Prada, Mohan Babu, Anjali Devi	Vijaya Creations
Buchi Babu	Dasari Narayana Rao	Akkineni Nageswara Rao, Jaya Prada	Annapurna Studios
Challenge Ramudu	T. L. V. Prasad	N. T. Rama Rao, Jaya Prada	
Chandipriya	V. Madhusudhana Rao	Chiranjeevi, Sobhan Babu, Jaya Prada, Anjali Devi	Annapurna Pictures
Chesina Baasalu	K. S. R. Das	Sobhan Babu, Jaya Prada, Murali Mohan, Madhavi	Srikanth Pictures
Chuttalunnaru Jagratha	B. V. Prasad	Krishna, Sridevi, Kavitha, Rao Gopal Rao	Amrutha Pictures
Circus Ramudu	Dasari Narayana Rao	N. T. Rama Rao, Jaya Prada, Sujatha	K. C. Films International
Dharma Chakram	Lakshmi Deepak	Sobhan Babu, Jaya Prada, Mohan Babu, Prabhakar Reddy, Jayamalini	Y L N Pictures
Gaja Donga	K. Raghavendra Rao	N. T. Rama Rao, Sridevi, Jayasudha	Vijaya Durga Art Pictures
Gandhara Golam	Singeetham Srinivasa Rao	Mohan Babu, Shilpa Chakravarthy	
Gayyali Gangamma	Beeram Mastan Rao	Suryakantham, Chandra Mohan, Rajinikanth	Tirupathi International
Guru	I. V. Sasi	Kamal Haasan, Sridevi	
Harischandrudu	U. Viswesar Rao	Prabhakar Reddy, Jayachitra, Savitri	
Jathara	D. Havala Satyam	Chiranjeevi, Sreedhar, Nagabhushanam	
Kaali	I. V. Sasi	Rajinikanth, Chiranjeevi, Seema, Fatafat Jayalakshmi	Sujatha Films private Ltd
Kaksha	V. C. Guhanathan	Sobhan Babu, Sridevi, Murali Mohan, Jayachitra, Gummadi	Suresh Productions
Kaliyuga Ravanasurudu	Bapu	Surapaneni Sridhar, Rao Gopala Rao, Saradha, Murali Mohan, Deepa, Allu Ramalingaiah	Raja Lakshmi Cine Art Creations
Kiladi Krishnudu	Vijaya Nirmala	Krishna, Vijayashanti, Chandra Mohan, Pandari Bai	Sangamam Art Pictures
Kodallu Vastunnaru Jagratha	Katta Subba Rao	Sobhan Babu, Saradha, Geetha	Vishnupriyaa Productions
Kotha Jeevithalu	Bharatiraja	Suhasini, Gummadi	
Kottapeta Rowdy	P. Sambasiva Rao	Krishna, Chiranjeevi, Jaya Prada, Mohan Babu, Pandari Bai	Satya Chitra International
Love in Singapore	Baby	Ranganath, Latha, Chiranjeevi	SVS Films
Maa Bhoomi	Gautam Ghose	Sai Chand, Rami Reddy	
Mahalakshmi	Rajachandra	Sobhan Babu, Vanisri, Subhashini, Mohan Babu	Sri Kumaraswamy Films
Manavude Mahaneeyudu	P. Chandrashekar Reddy	Sobhan Babu, Mohan Babu, Sujatha	
Mayadari Krishnudu	R. Thyagarajan	Rajinikanth, Rati Agnihotri, Sujatha, Sridhar	Devar Films
Mogudu Kaavali	Katta Subba Rao	Chiranjeevi, Gayathri, Nutan Prasad	Charitra Chitra
Moodu Mulla Bandham	Muthyala Subbaiah	Sarath Babu, Rajendra Prasad, Madhavi	Gomatha Art Creations
Mosagadu	K. Raghavendra Rao	Chiranjeevi, Sobhan Babu, Sridevi	Sri Kranthi Chitra Productions
Nakili Manishi	S. D. Lal	Chiranjeevi, Sangeeta, Suneetha, Kaikala Satyanarayana	Ravi Chitra
Nayakudu Vinayakudu	K. Pratyagatma	Akkineni Nageswara Rao, Jayalalitha	
Pilla Zamindar	Singeetham Srinivasa Rao	Akkineni Nageshwara Rao, Jayasudha	Annapurna Studios
Prema Kanuka	K. Raghavendra Rao	Akkineni Nageswara Rao, Sridevi, Sujatha	Annapurna Studios
Prema Tarangalu	S. P. Chittibabu	Krishnam Raju, Chiranjeevi, Jayasudha, Sujatha	Prabhu Chitra
Punnami Naagu	Rajasekhar	Chiranjeevi, Rati Agnihotri, Narasimharaju	AVM Studios
Rakta Bandham	Aaluri Ravi	Chiranjeevi, Suvarna	Ricoh Films
Ram Robert Rahim	Vijaya Nirmala	Rajinikanth, Krishna, Chandra Mohan	
Ramudu Parasuramudu	M. S. Gopinath	Sobhan Babu, Rati Agnihotri, Latha, Pandari Bai	Suresh Fine Arts
Rowdy Ramudu Konte Krishnudu	K. Raghavendra Rao	N. T. Rama Rao, Sridevi, Nandamuri Balakrishna, Vijayalakshmi	
Sankarabharanam	K. Viswanath	J. V. Somayajulu, Chandra Mohan, Manju Bhargavi, Rajyalakshmi, Thulasi, Allu Ramalingaiah	Purnodaya Art Creations
Sannayi Appanna	Lakshmi Deepak	Sobhan Babu, Jaya Pradha, Kavitha, Allu Ramalingaiah, Nutan Prasad	Sri Ramana Chitra
Sarada Ramudu	K. Vasu	N. T. Rama Rao, Jayasudha	
Sardar Papa Rayudu	Dasari Narayana Rao	N. T. Rama Rao, Sridevi, Saradha	Sri Annapurna International
Sirimalle Navvindi	Vijaya Nirmala	Krishna, Sujatha	
Sita Ramulu	Dasari Narayana Rao	Krishnam Raju, Jaya Prada, Mohan Babu	Jayakrishna Movies
Srivari Muchatlu	Dasari Narayana Rao	Akkineni Nageswara Rao, Jaya Prada, Jayasudha	Lakshmi Films Combines
Subhodhayam	K. Viswanath	Chandra Mohan, Sulakshana, Manorama	Sri Ram Art Pictures
Superman	V. Madhusudhana Rao	N. T. Rama Rao, Jaya Prada	
Thathayya Premaleelalu	B. V. Prasad	Chiranjeevi, Geetha, Seema, Nutan Prasad, Kaikala Satyanarayana	Kaumudi Arts
Tholi Kodi Koosindi	K. Balachander	Sarath Babu, Saritha, Seema	
Ammayi Mogudu Mamaku Yamudu	Amrutha	Krishna, Rajani Sharma, Kaikala Satyanarayana	
Yedanthasthula Meda		ANR, Sujatha, Jayasudha	
Yuvatharam Kadilindi	Dhavala Satyam	Murali Mohan, Radhika	Navatharam Pictures
Vamsa Vruksham	Bapu	Anil Kapoor, Jyothi	
