= List of Telugu films of 1981 =

This is a list of films produced by the Telugu language film industry (Tollywood) in the year 1981.

== 1981 ==
Title	Director	Cast	Music	Notes
Aadavaallu Meeku Joharlu	K. Balachander	Jayamalini, Krishnamraju, Jayasudha	K. V. Mahadevan	
Aakali Rajyam	K. Balachander	Kamal Haasan, Sridevi, Ramana Murthi J.V.	M. S. Viswanathan	
Addala Meda	Dasari Narayana Rao	Mohan Babu, Murali Mohan		
Aggi Ravva	K. Bapaiah	N. T. Rama Rao, Mohan Babu, Sridevi	K. V. Mahadevan	
Agni Poolu	K. Bapaiah	Krishnamraju, Jayasudha, Jaya Prada	K. V. Mahadevan	
Alludugaru Zindabad	Subba Rao Katta	Gummadi, Sharada		
Amavasya Chandrudu	Singeetam Srinivasa Rao	Kamal Haasan, Madhavi	Ilaiyaraaja	
Antham Kadidi Aarambam	Vijaya Nirmala	Krishna, Vijaya Nirmala		
Asha Jyoti	T. Prakash Rao	Gummadi, Murali Mohan		
Babulugaadi Debba	K. Vasu	Krishnam Raju, Sridevi, Radhika	J. V. Raghavulu	
Bala Nagamma	K. Shankar	Sarath Babu, Sridevi	Ilaiyaraaja	
Bhoga Bhagyalu	P. Chandrasekhara Reddy	Gummadi, Sridevi		
Bhogimanthulu	Vijaya Nirmala	Rati Agnihotri, Anjali Devi, Krishna		
Chattaniki Kallu Levu	S. A. Chandrasekhar	Chiranjeevi, Madhavi, Lakshmi Narayan	Krishna-Chakra	
Chinnaari Chittibaau	Gopalakrishnan, K. Subba Rao			
Dabbu Dabbu Dabbu	Vijaya Baapineedu	Mohan Babu, Murali Mohan, Radhika		
Devudu Mamayya	K. Vasu	Shobhan Babu, Nagesh, Sreedhar Surapaneni		
Erra Mallelu	Dhavala Satyam	Madala Ranga Rao		
Gaja Donga	K. Raghavendra Rao	N. T. Rama Rao, Sridevi, Jayasudha	K. Chakravarthy	
Guru Sishyulu	K. Bapayya	ANR, Krishna, Sridevi, Sujatha	K. V. Mahadevan	
Illalu	T. Rama Rao	Shobhan Babu, Jayasudha, Satyanarayana Kaikala	S. Rajeswara Rao	
Jagamondi	V. Madhusudan Rao	Shobhan Babu, Rati Agnihotri, Sowcar Janaki	K. Chakravarthy	
Jeevitha Ratham	V. Madhusudan Rao	Rati Agnihotri, Shobhan Babu, Anjali Devi	K. Chakravarthy	
Kirayi Rowdylu	Kodanda Rami Reddy A.	Chiranjeevi, Mohan Babu, Radhika		
Kondaveeti Simham	K. Raghavendra Rao	N. T. Rama Rao, Sridevi, Jayanthi	K. Chakravarthy	
Maha Purushudu	P. Lakshmi Deepak	N. T. Rama Rao, Jayasudha, Sujatha		
Mudda Mandaram	Jandhyala	Poornima, Pradeep, Annapoorna, Suthivelu	Ramesh Naidu	
Nyayam Kavali	Kodanda Rami Reddy A.	Radhika, Chiranjeevi, Jaggayya	K. Chakravarthy	
O Amma Katha	Vasanta Sen	Sharada		
Oorukichchina Maata	Balaiah M.	Chiranjeevi, Sudhakar, Madhavi	M. S. Viswanathan	
Ooruki Monagadu	K. Raghavendra Rao	Raogopalrao, Krishna, Jaya Prada	K. Chakravarthy	
Pakkinti Ammayi	K. Vasu	Jayasudha, Chandra Mohan, S. P. Balasubrahmanyam		
Parvathi Parameswarulu	M. S. Koti Reddy	Chiranjeevi, Jayanthi, Prabhakar Reddy	Satyam	
Patalam Pandu		Mohan Babu		
Prema Kanuka	K. Raghavendra Rao	Akkineni Nageswara Rao, Sridevi	K. Chakravarthy	
Prema Mandiram	Dasari Narayana Rao	Akkineni Nageshwara Rao, Gummadi, Jaya Prada	K. V. Mahadevan	
Prema Natakam	Subba Rao Katta	Sharada, Chiranjeevi, Murali Mohan		
Prema Pichchi	C. V. Rajendran	Rati Agnihotri, Deepa, Kamal Haasan		
Prema Simhasanam	Dasari Narayana Rao	N. T. Rama Rao, K. R. Vijaya, Rati Agnihotri, Manju Bhargavi	K. Chakravarthy	
Premabhishekam	Dasari Narayana Rao	Akkineni Nageshwara Rao, Sridevi, Jayasudha	K. Chakravarthy	
Priya	S. P. Chitti Babu	Chiranjeevi, Radhika, Chandramohan		
Puli Bidda	V. Madhusudan Rao	Krishnam Raju, Anjali Devi, Sridevi	K. Chakravarthy	
Radha Kalyanam	Bapu	Chandramohan, Radhika, Sarath Babu	K. V. Mahadevan	
Ragile Jwala	K. Raghavendra Rao	Krishnam Raju, Sujatha, Jaya Prada	K. Chakravarthy	
Rani Kasula Rangamma	T. L. V. Prasad	Chiranjeevi, Sridevi	K. Chakravarthy	
Sandhya Ragam	A. S. Ramachandra Rao	Gummadi		
Saptapadi	Kashinathuni Vishwanath	J. V. Somayajulu, Allu Rama Lingaiah		
Satyabhama	K. Raghavendra Rao	Chandramohan, Jayasudha		
Satyam Shivam	K. Raghavendra Rao	N. T. Rama Rao, Akkineni Nageshwara Rao, Sridevi	K. Chakravarthy	
Seethakoka Chilaka	Bharathiraja	Karthik, Mucherla Aruna, Sarath Babu	Ilaiyaraaja	
Siddhalingeshwara Mahima	Hunsur Krishnamurthy			
Srirasthu Subhamasthu	Katta Subba Rao	Chiranjeevi, Saritha, Nutan Prasad		
Srivari Muchatlu	Dasari Narayana Rao	Akkineni Nageswara Rao, Jaya Prada, Jayasudha	K. Chakravarthy	
Swapna	Dasari Narayana Rao	Swapna	Satyam	
Taxi Driver	S. P. Chitti Babu	Krishnam Raju, Jaya Prada, Mohan Babu		
Tirugu Leni Manishi	K. Raghavendra Rao	Rati Agnihotri, Chiranjeevi, N. T. Rama Rao	K. V. Mahadevan	
Todu Dongalu	K. Vasu	Krishna, Chiranjeevi, Geetha	Satyam	
Tyagayya	Bapu	J. V. Somayajulu, K. R. Vijaya	K. V. Mahadevan	
Viswaroopam	Dasari Narayana Rao	N. T. Rama Rao, Jayasudha	K. Chakravarthy	
Pranaya Geetham	P. Sambasiva Rao	Chandra Mohan, Sujatha, Gummadi, Nutan Prasad		
18	Talli Kodukula Anubandham	K. S. R. Das	Sri Umayambikai Combines	
