= Himmatwala (2013 film) =

2013 Indian film by Sajid Khan

- Theatrical release poster
- Directed by: Sajid Khan
- Written by: Sajid Khan (story, screenplay); Sajid-Farhad (dialogues)
- Based on: Ooruki Monagadu by K. Raghavendra Rao
- Produced by: Ronnie Screwvala; Vashu Bhagnani
- Starring: Ajay Devgn; Tamannaah Bhatia; Paresh Rawal; Mahesh Manjrekar; Leena Jumani; Adhyayan Suman; Zarina Wahab; Anil Dhawan
- Cinematography: Manoj Soni
- Edited by: Nitin Madhukar Rokade
- Music by: Bappi Lahiri (original); Sajid–Wajid (recreated, original); Sachin–Jigar (guest); Sandeep Shirodkar (score)
- Production companies: UTV Motion Pictures; Pooja Entertainment
- Distributed by: UTV Motion Pictures
- Release date: 29 March 2013
- Running time: 150 minutes
- Country: India
- Language: Hindi
- Budget: ₹68 crore
- Box office: ₹68.87 crore

Himmatwala (transl. Brave One) is a 2013 Indian Hindi-language action comedy film written and directed by Sajid Khan and jointly produced by Ronnie Screwvala and Vashu Bhagnani. The film stars Ajay Devgn and Tamannaah Bhatia in the lead roles. Set in 1983, it is an official remake of the 1983 film of the same name by K. Raghavendra Rao, which was, in turn, a remake of the 1981 Telugu film Ooruki Monagadu. The film was theatrically released worldwide on 29 March 2013, and was critically panned and underperformed at the box office, earning 68.87 crore against a budget of 68 crore.

== Plot ==
The story, set in 1983, begins with Ravi winning a fight in a nightclub. He is known as 'Himatwala', which means 'courageous man'. He then travels to Ramnagar village, where he is reunited with his mother, Savitri, and his younger sister, Padma. They are living a miserable life.

Savitri tells Ravi that their father, Dharamurthy, was a respected and honest temple priest. However, he was framed by Sher Singh, the tyrannical landlord, who had seen him commit a murder and framed him for robbing the temple. Distraught, Ravi's father took his own life. Seeking revenge, the young Ravi tries to kill Sher Singh but fails. When their house burns down, Savitri tells Ravi to run away because Sher Singh will kill him.

Fuelled by a thirst for revenge, Ravi beats up Narayan Das, Sher Singh's manager and brother-in-law, and issues a threat to Sher Singh. The next day, Ravi publicly humiliates Sher Singh's daughter, Rekha, for having beaten up her innocent driver. In retaliation, Rekha sets a tiger on Ravi in the village. However, her plan backfires. She falls from the terrace and is about to be attacked by the animal when Ravi jumps and saves her. Rekha falls in love with Ravi, and later saves his life by thwarting her father's schemes.

Meanwhile, Ravi finds out that Padma is in love with Shakti, Narayan Das's son. They both object. However, Sher Singh informs Narayan Das that marrying Shakti to Padma would give them the upper hand over Ravi, as they could mistreat Padma to control him. Padma now knows that the man living with her is not the real Ravi, who died in a road accident. Before he died, Ravi had asked Sher Singh to look after his family. Initially upset, Padma reconciles with Ravi after he saves her life.

Shortly after Padma and Shakti marry, both father and son start to mistreat her. Seeking revenge, Ravi uses Rekha against her own father, just as she advises him to do. After Rekha tells her father, Sher Singh, that she is pregnant with Ravi's child, he begs Ravi to marry her. Ravi eventually punishes Narayan Das and Shakti by making them do all the household chores. He also wins the election for sarpanch, after which Sher Singh finally returns all the property documents that he had illegally taken from the villagers.

However, Shakti overhears Rekha and Ravi discussing the fake pregnancy and realises that Ravi is not who he says he is. Enraged by this information, Sher Singh sends twenty of his men to kill Ravi. While they are beating him, the same tiger that Ravi had previously fought appears and saves his life. Ravi then brutally beats Shakti, but as he is about to kill Sher Singh, his mother stops him. Ultimately, Sher Singh, Narayan Das and Shakti ask Ravi, Savitri, Padma and the other villagers for forgiveness.

== Cast ==
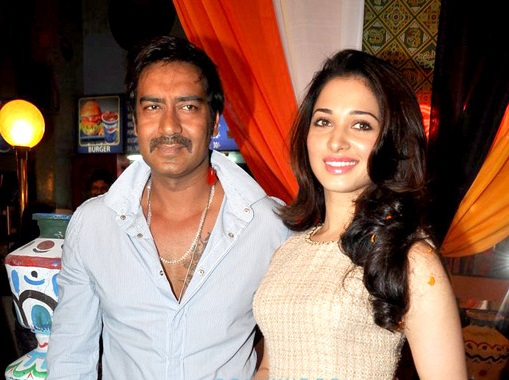
Ajay Devgn with co-star Tamannaah Bhatia during the trailer launch of their film Himmatwala

- Ajay Devgn as Ravi Verma (II) "Himmatwala" Ravi, Rekha's love interest and Ravi's friend
- Tamannaah Bhatia as Rekha Singh, Ravi (II)'s love interest and Sher Singh's daughter (Mona Ghosh Shetty as the Hindi dubbing voice)
- Paresh Rawal as Narayan Das, Sher Singh's brother-in-law, Shakti's father, and Rekha's uncle
- Mahesh Manjrekar as Sher Singh, Rekha's father
- Adhyayan Suman as Shakti Das, Narayan's son, Rekha's cousin, Padma's husband, and Ravi's brother-in-law
- Zarina Wahab as Savitri Verma, Dharamurthy's widow, Ravi and Padma's mother, and Shakti's mother-in-law
- Leena Jumani as Padma Verma/Padma Shakti Das, Savitri and Dharamurthy's daughter, Ravi's younger sister, and Shakti's wife
- Anil Dhawan as Dharamurthy Verma, Savitri's dead husband, Ravi and Padma's father, and Shakti's father-in-law

=== Cameo appearance ===
- Riteish Deshmukh as Ravi Verma, Savitri and Dharamurthy's dead son, Padma's older brother, and Ravi (II)'s friend
- Chunky Panday as Michael Jaikishan
- Surveen Chawla in the song "Dhoka Dhoka"
- Amruta Khanvilkar in the song "Dhoka Dhoka"
- Sayantani Ghosh in the song "Dhoka Dhoka"
- Rinku Ghosh in the song "Dhoka Dhoka"
- Mona Thiba in the song "Dhoka Dhoka"
- Sonakshi Sinha in the song "Thank God It's Friday"

== Music ==
Himmatwala

Soundtrack album by Sajid–Wajid
- Released: 8 February 2013
- Recorded: 2012
- Genre: Feature film soundtrack
- Length: 19:10
- Labels: Saregama, UTV
- Producer: Sajid–Wajid

Sajid–Wajid chronology
Dabangg 2 (2012)	Himmatwala (2013)	Chashme Baddoor (2013)

The soundtrack includes remakes of the songs from the original version of the film, "Taki O Taki" and "Nainon Mein Sapna". The song promo of "Naino Mein Sapna" was released on 8 February 2013. The background score was composed by Sandeep Shirodkar, while the songs are composed by Sajid–Wajid and Sachin–Jigar. Lyricist Indeevar wrote for "Taki O Taki" and "Nainon Mein Sapna", alongside Sameer Anjaan, who wrote for all the songs except a disco-based song, for which lyricist Mayur Puri wrote.

No.	Title	Lyrics	Music	Singer(s)	Length
1.	"Nainon Mein Sapna"	Indeevar	Bappi Lahiri	Amit Kumar, Shreya Ghoshal	4:20
2.	"Taki O Taki"	Indeevar	Bappi Lahiri	Mika Singh, Shreya Ghoshal	4:00
3.	"Dhoka Dhoka"	Sameer Anjaan	Sajid–Wajid	Bappi Lahiri, Sunidhi Chauhan, Mamta Sharma	4:53
4.	"Bum Pe Laat"	Sameer	Sajid–Wajid	Shaan, Soham Chakraborty, Shubh Mukherjee	2:47
5.	"Thank God It's Friday"	Mayur Puri	Sachin–Jigar	Sunidhi Chauhan	3:12
Total length:					19:05

== Release ==
The first look poster of Himmatwala film was released on 23 March 2013, whilst the trailer was released on 24 January 2013. The film was theatrically released on 29 March 2013.
