= Ooruki Monagadu =

1981 film by K. Raghavendra Rao

- Film poster
- Directed by: K. Raghavendra Rao
- Written by: Satyanand (dialogue)
- Produced by: A. Gopala Krishna
- Starring: Krishna; Jayaprada
- Cinematography: K. S. Prakash
- Edited by: Kotagiri Venkateswara Rao
- Music by: Chakravarthy
- Production company: Gopi Movies
- Release date: 11 January 1981
- Running time: 140 minutes
- Country: India
- Language: Telugu
- Box office: est. ₹2.5 crores

Ooruki Monagadu (transl. Hero of the village) is a 1981 Indian Telugu-language action comedy film directed by K. Raghavendra Rao. The film stars Krishna and Jayaprada in the lead roles. It was a commercial success at the box office and became one of the highest-grossing Telugu films of 1981.

The film marked the third collaboration between Krishna and director Raghavendra Rao, following their successful partnership in Bhale Krishnudu (1980) and Gharana Donga (1980). Ooruki Monagadu was later remade twice in Hindi as Himmatwala: first in 1983 and again in 2013.

== Plot ==
Master Dharma Murti witnesses the murder of a man at the hands of Sher Singh Bandookwala. But Sher Singh with his might, terror, and money is set free. In revenge, Bandookwala places Dharam Murti in an awkward position with a lady teacher, Menaka. Dharam Murti ashamed of this, vacates his village and abandons his wife & children.

His wife Savitri helps her son Ravi become an engineer who then resolves to fight against Bandookwala and get his father's ruined reputation back. Bandookwala has terrorised all the villagers. His daughter Rekha follows in his footsteps and grows into an insensitive woman who tries to harass people. Ravi's sister Padma has to marry Munimji's son Shakti as she is pregnant with his child. After marriage, Shakti and Bandookwala together start harassing Padma. Rekha falls in love with Ravi and decides to play the same trick against her father Bandookwala by pretending to be pregnant with Ravi's child. Ravi finds his father as a worker on a dam construction site. Ravi then presents Bandookwala guilty before the panchayat but is freed by Dharam Murti on the condition that he should show affection to the poor and treat them well. Finally, Bandookwala becomes a good man and then Ravi marries Rekha.

== Cast ==
- Krishna as Ravi
- Jayaprada as Rekha
- Chandra Mohan
- Kanta Rao
- Rao Gopal Rao
- Geetha
- Prasad Babu
- Modukuri sathyam

== Music ==
Ooruki Monagadu

Soundtrack album by K. Chakravarthy
- Released: 1981
- Recorded: 1981
- Genre: Soundtrack
- Language: Telugu
- Label: Saregama
- Producer: K. Chakravarthy

Track-List
No.	Title	Lyrics	Singer(s)	Length
1.	"Kadilirandi Manushulaithey"	Arudhra	S. P. Balasubrahmanyam
2.	"Andhaala Javvan"	Veturi	P. Susheela, S. P. Balasubrahmanyam
3.	"Moggapindhe"	Veturi	S. P. Balasubrahmanyam, P. Susheela
4.	"Idigo Tella Cheera"	Veturi	S. P. Balasubrahmanyam, P. Susheela
5.	"Buzzam Banthi"	Veturi	S. P. Balasubrahmanyam, P. Susheela
6.	"Erra Tholu"	Veturi	S. P. Balasubrahmanyam, S.P. Sailaja
