= Yuddha Bhoomi =

Yudda Bhoomi
- Directed by: K. Raghavendra Rao
- Written by: M. V. S. Haranatha Rao (dialogues)
- Produced by: K. Krishna Mohan Rao
- Starring: Chiranjeevi; Vijayashanti; Mohan Babu; Murali Mohan; Nutan Prasad; Allu Rama Lingaiah
- Cinematography: K. S. Prakash
- Edited by: Kotagiri Venkateswara Rao
- Music by: K. Chakravarthy
- Release date: 11 November 1988
- Country: India
- Language: Telugu

Yudda Bhoomi (lit. 'Battlefield') is a 1988 Telugu action film directed by K. Raghavendra Rao starring Chiranjeevi in the lead role opposite Vijayashanti with Jaggayya, Mohan Babu, Murali Mohan, Nutan Prasad and Allu Ramalingaiah playing other important roles. Bollywood actor Shakti Kapoor in his second Telugu film essayed an antagonistic role alongside Mohan Babu.

== Plot ==
An army officer comes to his village for a vacation, but seeing the bad state of his village, he stands up against the atrocities that people face because of the evil landlord.

== Cast ==
- Chiranjeevi
- Vijayashanti
- Shakti Kapoor
- Jaggayya
- Mohan Babu
- Murali Mohan
- Nutan Prasad
- Allu Ramalingaiah
- Rallapalli
- Vijayan
- Sudhakar
- Prasad Babu
- Brahmanandam
- Suthi Velu
- Telephone Satyanarayana
- Chidatala Appa Rao
- Chitti Babu
- Modukuri Satyam
- Shubha
- Mucherla Aruna
- Master Rajesh

== Soundtrack ==
Soundtrack was composed by Chakravarthy.

No.	Title	Singer(s)	Length
1.	"Abbabba Chandamama"	S. P. Balasubrahmanyam, K. S. Chithra	4:29
2.	"Veera Magadeera"	S. P. Balasubrahmanyam, K. S. Chithra	4:34
3.	"Jaali Jaali Sande Gaali"	S. P. Balasubrahmanyam, S. Janaki	4:25
4.	"Vayaso Namaha"	S.Janaki, S. P. Balasubrahmanyam	4:52
5.	"Emiti Eppudu Ekkada"	S. P. Balasubrahmanyam, S.Janaki	4:20
6.	"Gaalochi Takindamma"	S.Janaki, S. P. Balasubrahmanyam
