= Kovai Chezhiyan =

Indian senior leader

- Born: Murugesan; 29 December 1931; Kungarupalayam, Kangeyam, Tamil Nadu, India
- Died: 14 March 2000 (aged 68); Chennai, Tamil Nadu, India
- Other name: Kovai Chezhiyan
- Years active: 1931-2000
- Spouse: Kamalam Chezhiyan
- Children: Sembian Sivakumar, Madhavi, Vasuki, Kabilan
- Parents: Sellamuthu Gounder (father); Pappammal (mother)

Kovai Chezhiyan was an Indian senior leader of the Dravidian movement in the Kongu Nadu region and film producer who worked in the 1950s up to late 1990s. He was also the vice-chairman of the Tamil Nadu Planning Commission when M. G. Ramachandran was the Chief Minister. He had produced films with famous stars including Ramachandran, N. T. Rama Rao, Sivaji Ganesan, Gemini Ganesan, Sivakumar, R. Muthuraman, J. Jayalalithaa, Vijayakanth, Rajesh Khanna, Mammotty, etc. Chezhiyan, originally from Tamil Nadu, also produced Telugu and Hindi films also and was the first president of Tamil Film Producers Council. He was earlier the Honorary Secretary of the South Indian Film Chamber of Commerce. He was involved in politics and closely associated with Periyar, Anna, Kalaignar, and Ramachandran.

He was later introduced to Tamil films as a producer by his friend Kavignar Kannadasan, who initially produced films with Kannadasan as partner and later individually from the movie Sumaithangi directed by Sridhar. He produced and distributed various films in Tamil, Telugu and Hindi successfully. He was the first President of the Tamil Film Producers Council.

Kovai Chezhiyan was the founder President of Kongu Vellala Goundergal Peravai. He was elected as an MLA of Kangeyam in 1971. He was also the selection committee chairman of Tamil Nadu Agricultural University. During the later part of his life he worked tirelessly for the uplifting the folks of the Kongu region and the Kongu Vellala Gounders. He was one of the main person, who along with his colleagues got the Backward Community Status for the Kongu Vellalars who are the numerically powerful community in Western Tamilnadu, during the tenure of chief minister Kalaignar Karunanidhi.

He died on March 14, 2000. After his death in 2000, the Kongu Vellala Gounder Peravai constructed a memorial and arch in his native place at Kungarupalayam, near Kangayam in Tirupur district where thousands from Kongu region visit every year on his anniversary (14 March) to pay respects to him.

Kamalam Chezhiyan, wife of Kovai Chezhiyan died on April 24, 2021, due to age related ailments.

== Filmography ==
- Sumaithaangi (1962)
- Ooty Varai Uravu (1967)
- Kumari Kottam (1971)
- Uzhaikkum Karangal (1976)
- Circus Ramudu (1980)
- Chandamama (1982)
- Asha Jyoti (1984)
- Enakku Nane Needipathi (1986)
- Mounam Sammadham (1990)
- Azhagan (1991)
- Pudhayal(1997)
