= Satyam Sivam =

- Theatrical release poster
- Directed by: K. Raghavendra Rao
- Written by: Satyanand
- Screenplay by: K. Raghavendra Rao
- Story by: Prayag Raj
- Based on: Suhaag (1979)
- Produced by: D. Venkateswara Rao
- Starring: N. T. Rama Rao; Akkineni Nageswara Rao; Sridevi; Rati Agnihotri; Bhanu Chander; Vijaya Shanti
- Cinematography: K. S. Prakash
- Edited by: Ravi
- Music by: Chakravarthy
- Production company: Eeswari Creations
- Release date: 28 May 1981
- Country: India
- Language: Telugu

Satyam Sivam is a 1981 Indian Telugu-language action film, produced by D. Venkateswara Rao under the Eeswari Creations banner and directed by K. Raghavendra Rao. The film stars N. T. Rama Rao, Akkineni Nageswara Rao, Sridevi, Rati Agnihotri and music composed by Chakravarthy. The film is a remake of the Hindi film Suhaag (1979).

== Cast ==
- N. T. Rama Rao as Sivam
- Akkineni Nageswara Rao as Satyam
- Sridevi as Parvati
- Rati Agnihotri as Rekha
- Satyanarayana as Nagaraju
- Mohan Babu as Mohan
- Prabhakar Reddy as Seshu
- Allu Ramalingaiah as Constable Pachipulusu Paramanandam
- Mikkilineni as Dada
- Bhanu Chander as Gopal
- Tyagaraju as Kunti
- P. J. Sarma as I.G.
- Chalapathi Rao as Inspector Chalapathi Rao
- Raavi Kondala Rao as PR Pappu / Pappus Panakalu Rao
- Vijayashanti as Santhi
- Pushpalatha as Janaki
- Pushpa Kumari as Chalapati Rao's wife
- Athili Lakshmi
- Krishna Veni as Lalitha

== Soundtrack ==
Satyam Shivam

Film score by Chakravarthy
- Released: 1981
- Genre: Soundtrack
- Length: 28:43
- Label: AVM Audio
- Producer: Chakravarthy

Chakravarthy chronology
| Maha Purushudu (1981) | Satyam Shivam (1981) | Prema Kanuka (1981) |

Music composed by Chakravarthy. Lyrics were written by Veturi.

| S.No | Song title | Singers | length |
|---|---|---|---|
| 1 | "Motha Gunnavo Pillo" | S. P. Balasubrahmanyam, P. Susheela | 3:29 |
| 2 | "Andhame Andhama" | S. P. Balasubrahmanyam, S. Janaki | 4:26 |
| 3 | "Enaka Mundhu" | S. P. Balasubrahmanyam, S. Janaki | 4:25 |
| 4 | "Jambalagiri Panbakaada" | S. P. Balasubrahmanyam, P. Susheela | 3:03 |
| 5 | "Manchi Tharunam" | S. P. Balasubrahmanyam, S. Janaki, S. P. Sailaja | 5:25 |
| 6 | "Velugu Needalalo" | S. P. Balasubrahmanyam, S. Janaki, S.P.Sailaja | 4:34 |
| 7 | "Saage Nadule" | S. P. Balasubrahmanyam | 4:21 |
