= Alludugaru =

- Poster
- Directed by: K. Raghavendra Rao
- Produced by: Mohan Babu
- Starring: Mohan Babu; Ramya Krishna; Shobana; Jaggayya; Chandramohan; Kaikala Satyanarayana
- Cinematography: A. Vincent
- Music by: K. V. Mahadevan
- Production company: Sri Lakshmi Prasanna Pictures
- Release date: 28 September 1990
- Running time: 144 minutes
- Country: India
- Language: Telugu

Alludugaru or Alludu Garu is a 1990 Indian Telugu-language drama film directed by K. Raghavendra Rao and produced by Mohan Babu under Lakshmi Prasanna Films. This film stars Mohan Babu and Shobhana in lead roles, while Ramya Krishna also appeared in an important supporting role. It was commercially and critically successful running for more than 100 days. The music of the movie was composed by K. V. Mahadevan.

This film is a remake of 1988, Malayalam blockbuster film, Chithram.

== Cast ==
- Mohan Babu as Vishnu
- Shobana as Kalyani (Voice Dubbed by Roja Ramani)
- Ramya Krishna as Revathi
- Jaggayya as Ramachandra Prasad
- Chandramohan as Anandarao
- Kaikala Satyanarayana as Jailer
- Gollapudi Maruthi Rao as Purushotham
- Ananth
- Sudhakar
- Sarathi
- Chitti Babu
- Nizhalgal Ravi as Gopal

== Soundtrack ==
Soundtrack composed by K. V. Mahadevan is owned by Aditya Music.

Tracklist
No.	Title	Lyrics	Singer(s)	Length
1.	"Kondameeda Chukkapotu"	Jaladi Raja Rao	S. P. Balasubrahmanyam, K. S. Chithra	6:34
2.	"Kondalalo Nelakonna"	Annamacharya, Jonnavittula Ramalingeswara Rao	K. J. Yesudas, K. S. Chithra	4:05
3.	"Nagumomu Kanaleni"	Tyagaraja	K. J. Yesudas, Purna Chander	6:07
4.	"Ammo Ammo"	Rasaraju	S. P. Balasubrahmanyam, K. S. Chithra	4:49
5.	"Muddabanthi Navvulo"	Gurucharan	K. J. Yesudas, K. S. Chithra	4:57
Total length:				26:34

== Awards ==
- K. J. Yesudas won Nandi Award for Best Male Playback Singer for the song "Muddabanthi Navvulo".
