= Gharana Donga =

1980 Telugu action film

- Directed by: Kovelamudi Raghavendra Rao
- Written by: Jandhyala; Satyanand
- Produced by: T. Trivikrama Rao
- Starring: Krishna; Sridevi; Rao Gopala Rao; Mohan Babu
- Music by: K. Chakravarthy
- Production company: Vijaya Lakshmi Art Pictures
- Release date: 29 March 1980
- Country: India
- Language: Telugu

Gharana Donga (transl. The Proud Thief) is a 1980 Indian Telugu-language action film directed by Kovelamudi Raghavendra Rao and produced by T. Trivikrama Rao for Vijaya Lakshmi Art Pictures. A remake of the 1977 film Bengali film Nidhiram Sardar, it stars Krishna, Sridevi, Rao Gopal Rao, and Mohan Babu in lead roles. K. Chakravarthy scored and composed the film's soundtrack.

The film was released on 29 March 1980; the censor certificate dated 27 March 1980. The film, which marked the second collaboration of director Rao with Krishna after Bhale Krishnudu, turned out to be a success at the box office.

== Cast ==
The cast of the films is as follows.

- Krishna as Krishna
- Sridevi as Devi
- Rao Gopal Rao as Babu Lal
- Mohan Babu as Kishore Kumar
- Allu Ramalingaiah as Govindaiah
- Gummadi as Raghupathi, Devi's father
- Lakshmikanth as Ranga
- Mada as Krishna's assistant
- Sarathi as Krishna's assistant
- Geetha as Padma
- Pushpalatha as Parvathi, Krishna's mother
- Hema Sundar as Papa Rao, Krishna's father
- Mamatha as Bujjamma
- Chalapathi Rao as Professor, operator of counterfeit note machine
- Jayamalini
- Mukkamala as Rajaiah, Krishna's caretaker
- Chakravarthy as Seth

== Soundtrack ==
K. Chakravarthy scored and composed the film's soundtrack with the lyrics penned by Veturi Sundararama Murthy.

1. Dhimikita Dhimikita — S. P. B., P. Susheela
2. Vana Velisina — S. P. B., P. Susheela
3. Rotte Virigi — S. P. B., P. Susheela
4. O Muddu Krishna — S. P. B., P. Susheela
5. Chitikela Metikela — S. P. B., P. Susheela
6. Pampara Panasa — S. P. B., P. Susheela
