= Kotta Alludu =

- Theatrical poster
- Directed by: P. Sambhasiva Rao
- Written by: Mullapudi Venkata Ramana
- Produced by: M Satyanarayana; Suryanarayana
- Starring: Krishna; Jaya Prada; Chiranjeevi; Hema Choudhary; Mohan Babu
- Cinematography: Swamy
- Edited by: Kotagiri Gopal Rao
- Music by: K.V.Mahadevan
- Production company: Sri Siddhartha Films
- Release date: 31 May 1979
- Country: India
- Language: Telugu

Kotta Alludu (transl. New son-in-law) is a 1979 Indian Telugu-language film that stars Krishna, Jaya Prada, Chiranjeevi, Hema Chaudhary and Mohan Babu.

== Plot ==
The story revolves around themes of greed, family betrayal, and justice.

The primary conflict begins with Gummadi (playing a father figure), who possesses knowledge or ownership of Sanjeevni, a rare and valuable medicinal herb. His own son-in-law, Satyanarayana (playing the antagonist), is driven by extreme greed for this herb and the wealth it represents. In his pursuit of the herb, Satyanarayana goes as far as murdering Gummadi.

The narrative then shifts to the "new son-in-law," Hari (played by Superstar Krishna), who is married to Gummadi's eldest daughter, Leela (played by Jaya Prada). Upon discovering the treachery and the murder of his father-in-law, Hari takes it upon himself to protect the family and the legacy of the medicinal herb. The core of the movie follows Hari as he strategically outsmarts Satyanarayana and teaches him a lesson, eventually bringing justice to the family.

== Cast ==
- Krishna as Hari
- Jaya Prada as Leela
- Gummadi
- Chiranjeevi
- Hema Chaudhary
- Raja Babu
- Mohan Babu

== Production ==
- Satya Chitra Productions

== Soundtrack ==
- Pillakadu Kadamma – S.P. Balasubrahmanyam, P. Susheela
- Demudu Varame Ichadu – S.P. Balasubrahmanyam
- Adigadigo Aa Navve – S.P. Balasubrahmanyam
- Rupayee Rupayee – S.P. Balasubrahmanyam
- Ekkada Vunnaru Srivaru – P. Susheela
- Hari Hari Srikrishna – S.P. Balasubrahmanyam, P. Susheela
