= Himmatwala (1983 film) =

1983 Indian film by K. Raghavendra Rao

- Theatrical release poster
- Directed by: K. Raghavendra Rao
- Written by: Kadar Khan (dialogues)
- Screenplay by: K. Raghavendra Rao
- Story by: Satyanand
- Based on: Ooruki Monagadu by K. Raghavendra Rao
- Produced by: G. A. Seshagiri Rao; Krishna (Presents)
- Starring: Jeetendra; Sridevi
- Cinematography: K. S. Prakash Rao
- Edited by: Kotagiri Venkateswara Rao
- Music by: Bappi Lahiri
- Production company: Padmalaya Studios
- Release date: 25 February 1983
- Running time: 150 minutes
- Country: India
- Language: Hindi
- Box office: {{INR\11.5 crore}}

Himmatwala (transl. 'The brave one') is a 1983 Indian Hindi-language action comedy film directed by K. Raghavendra Rao. The film stars Jeetendra and Sridevi in the lead roles, with G. A. Seshagiri Rao producing under the Padmalaya Studios banner and Krishna presenting the film. It is a remake of the 1981 Telugu film Ooruki Monagadu, which was also directed by Raghavendra Rao and starred Krishna.

Upon release, Himmatwala became a massive commercial success, grossing ₹5 crore and emerging as one of the highest-grossing Hindi films of the 1980s. The film marked a breakthrough for Sridevi in Hindi cinema, propelling her to stardom. Her performance in the popular song "Naino Mein Sapna" was widely appreciated, with Rediff noting that while the water pots dominated the frames, it was Sridevi's bejeweled outfits and headgear that captivated the audience.

== Plot ==
Master Dharam Murti sees Sher Singh Bandookwala kill a man. However, thanks to his wealth and influence, Bandookwala is exonerated. Seeking revenge, Bandookwala falsely accuses Murti of sexually assaulting a teacher named Menaka. Murti is deeply demoralised by the incident and leaves the village, abandoning his wife and children so that they will not face the stigma of being related to him.

His wife, Savitri, works tirelessly to ensure that their son, Ravi, becomes an engineer. Ravi grows up and returns to the village as the chief engineer on the new dam construction project. Meanwhile, Bandookwala has been terrorising the villagers. His daughter Rekha follows in his footsteps by harassing people. Ravi's sister, Padma, becomes pregnant by Munimji's son, Shakti. Bandookwala wants to exploit this situation to torment Ravi.

According to his plan, Shakti marries Padma and starts to torture her. Eventually, Rekha realises how cruel her father is and falls in love with Ravi, admiring his honesty and kindness. She pretends to be pregnant, putting Bandookwala in the same position as Ravi with his sister. Ravi suddenly finds his father among the dam workers and brings him back to prove his innocence to the village council. Bandookwala is held responsible for all his wrongdoings and is due to be punished by the panchayat. However, Dharam Murti asks everyone to forgive him on condition that he reforms. Bandookwala promises to become a better person, and Rekha marries Ravi.

== Cast ==
- Jeetendra as Ravi
- Sridevi as Rekha Singh Bandookwala
- Waheeda Rehman as Savitri
- Shakti Kapoor as Shakti Gopaldas
- Kader Khan as Munim Narayandas Gopaldas
- Amjad Khan as Thakur Sher Singh Bandookwala
- Asrani as Bhushan
- Arun Govil as Govind
- Shoma Anand as Champa
- Swaroop Sampat as Padma Gopaldas
- Satyendra Kapoor as Dharam Murthy
- Sulochana Latkar as Govind's Grandmother

== Soundtrack ==
The music album was composed by Bappi Lahiri and the lyrics were penned by Indeevar.

Song	Singer
"Nainon Mein"	Kishore Kumar, Lata Mangeshkar
"Ladki Nahin Hai"	Kishore Kumar, Asha Bhosle
"Taki O Taki"	Kishore Kumar, Asha Bhosle
"Wah Wah Wah"	Kishore Kumar, Asha Bhosle
"Imtihan Imtihan"	S. P. Balasubrahmanyam

== Remake ==
A remake of the film starring Ajay Devgn and Tamannaah and directed by Sajid Khan, released under the same title on 29 March 2013. The film opened to negative reviews and became a box-office bomb.
