= Alludu Diddina Kapuram =

1991 Telugu film by Krishna

- Directed by: Krishna
- Written by: Jandhyala; Krishna
- Produced by: U. Suryanarayana Babu
- Starring: Krishna; Shobhana; Mohan Babu; B. Saroja Devi
- Cinematography: V. S. R. Swamy
- Edited by: Krishna
- Music by: Chakravarthy
- Production company: Padmavathi Films
- Release date: 14 August 1991
- Country: India
- Language: Telugu

Alludu Diddina Kapuram (transl. Family set right by son-in-law) is a 1991 Indian Telugu-language action comedy film written, edited and directed by Krishna who also played the lead role alongside Shobhana, Mohan Babu and Saroja Devi. U. Satyanarayana Babu produced the film for Padmavathi Films. The film opened to largely negative reviews and bombed badly at the box office.

== Plot ==
Ganganamma (B. Saroja Devi) is a vainglory, headstrong woman who takes authority over her property. She has a daughter Leela (Manasa) whom she pampers and a stepdaughter Seetha (Shobana) whom she mistreats. Her husband is timid and does not speak against her word. He is Seetha's and Leela's father who remarried Ganganamma after Seetha's mother passed away. Ganganamma also has a stepson Krishnamurthy (Siva Krishna) who is goodhearted and respects her. He, along with his wife and son, are frequently mistreated by her. Once, Ganganamma pesters her daughter-in-law's father about dowry money. Being from a poor family, he arranges the money and returns but dies at Ganganamma's doorstep. Meanwhile, Ganganamma's cousin Seenaiah (Gollapudi Maruti Rao) eyes her property and tries to usurp her wealth.

Upon seeing the atrocities and ill-treatment of Ganganamma towards everyone, Seetha's father goes to the city to meet his brother-in-law Viswanatham (M. Prabhakar Reddy) and consult their help. Viswanatham has a spoiled son Gautham (Krishna), a playboy and drunkard who lacks responsibility. The night Seetha's father comes to Viswanatham's house, a drunk Gautham accidentally hits him with his car. Before dying, Seetha's father explains Ganganamma's atrocities. Gautham, realizing his mistake, finally gives up his vices and also promises to set the family right.

Gautham and his good friend Panthulu (Giri Babu) head toward the village and inquire for Jagannatham (Mohan Babu), a horse-cart driver. They seek his help in playing a drama to bring Ganganamma to her senses. Initially struggling, they manage to make him play along. They pose Jagannatham as a rich multimillionaire who came to buy land in the village. Gautham poses as a villager named Bheemudu in disguise. Gautham and Seetha fall in love, while Jagannatham falls for Leela. Gautham slowly reforms Ganganamma, and also reunites her with Krishnamurthy and his family. Seenaiah tries to expose Gautham but fails. Ultimately, Seenaiah takes Ganganamma's signature on blank documents and prepares to snatch her wealth. However, Gautham, Jagannatham, and Panthulu fight off their men, but their drama is then exposed in the process. Ganganamma is injured and Seetha donates blood to save her life. Viswanatham arrives and finally reveals Gautham as his son, and Gautham reveals that Jagannatham is actually none other than Ganganamma's own nephew who was robbed of their wealth by Ganganamma the same way Seenaiah attempted. Ganganamma accepts her mistakes and reforms. The film ends on a happy note with the marriages of Gautham & Seetha and Jagannatham and Leela.

== Cast ==
- Krishna as Gautham/Bheemudu
- Shobhana as Seetha
- Mohan Babu as Jagannatham
- Saroja Devi as Ganga
- Manasa as Leela
- Siva Krishna as Krishnamurthy
- M. Prabhakar Reddy as Vishwanatham
- Kantha Rao as Seetha's father
- Gollapudi Maruthi Rao as Seenaiah
- Giribabu as Panthulu
- Disco Shanti
- Ashok Kumar
- Devadas Kanakala

== Songs ==
Chakravarthy scored and composed the film's soundtrack.

S. No.	Title	Lyricist	Singer
1.	"Idhi Mallea Masam"	Veturi Sundararama Murthy, Sirivennela Srinivasa Sastry, C. Narayana Reddy	S.P.Balasubramaniam & Swarnalatha
2.	"Ithadi Bindeku"	Veturi Sundararama Murthy, Sirivennela Srinivasa Sastry, C. Narayana Reddy	
3.	"Kasko Kanthamani"	Veturi Sundararama Murthy, Sirivennela Srinivasa Sastry, C. Narayana Reddy	
4.	"Labbudu Dibbudu"	C. Narayana Reddy, Veturi Sundararama Murthy, Sirivennela Srinivasa Sastry	
5.	"Vayassura"	C. Narayana Reddy, Sirivennela Srinivasa Sastry, Veturi Sundararama Murthy	
