= Naya Kadam =

- Poster
- Directed by: K. Raghavendra Rao
- Written by: Dialogues: Kader Khan; Presenter: A.S.R. Anjane Yulu
- Produced by: K. Raghavendra Rao; K. Mukherjee
- Starring: Rajesh Khanna; Sridevi; Jaya Prada; Padmini Kolhapure
- Cinematography: K. S. Prakash Rao
- Edited by: V. R. Kotagiri
- Music by: Bappi Lahiri
- Release date: 5 October 1984
- Running time: 180 minutes
- Country: India
- Language: Hindi

Naya Kadam (transl. New step) is a 1984 hit Indian Hindi-language drama film directed by K. Raghavendra Rao. The film stars Rajesh Khanna, Jaya Prada, Sridevi and Padmini Kolhapure. Kader Khan, Ranjeet and Om Shivpuri are featured in supporting roles. This film is a remake of Telugu film Trishulam (1982).

The film deals with the social issues of literacy, women empowerment and development and comments on the importance of literacy in the Indian villages, which is important for the progress of the country. In the film, Madhukar and Jaggu are Hitler-like tyrants who rule over a small community with an iron hand. They prefer to keep the inhabitants illiterate, so that they can continue to oppress and abuse them over time. But one young lad, Ramu, educates himself secretly with the help of the local school-master, Srikanth. Years later, Ramu has grown up and is now a formidable force to reckon with. Madhukar and Jaggu see him as a threat and soon spin a web of lies and deceit around him, leaving him with no alternative except to retreat, leaving the poor villagers once again at their mercy of their oppressors.

== Plot ==
Alok Madhukar and Jaggu are tyrants who rule over a village named Guptgaon, where most of the inhabitants are illiterate. Madhukar and Jaggu do not allow anyone to educate the children of the village. A villager named Srikant decides to start teaching the children. Madhukar tells him that he can only teach the children of the rich. He will not be allowed to teach the children of the workers or the children born into lower castes. This way Madhukar can continue to oppress the poor people. He threatens Srikant with dire consequences if his orders are not followed. A boy named Ramu lives in the village along with his widowed mother, who works as a servant in Madhukar's Bungalow with another an orphaned girl named Chanda. Ramu starts frequenting Madhukar's house and befriends his daughter Laxmi. Laxmi starts to study as she is the daughter of the rich Madhukar and seeing her, Ramu also wants to study. Ramu leaves the village with Master Srikant and goes to the city to educate himself. Years later, Ramu grows up and returns to the village. He starts to teach the villagers the importance of getting an education. He urges them to let their children to go to school.

Laxmi, who has become a college graduate, starts helping Ramu in his efforts. She also falls in love with Ramu and hopes to marry him. Laxmi is unaware that Chanda has also been in love with Ramu since childhood. Chanda takes care of Ramu's wellbeing whenever he is in the village. To bridge the gap between her and the educated Ramu, Chanda decides to learn how to read and write Hindi from Laxmi. One day she reads the diary of Laxmi and finds out about Laxmi's love for Ramu. Chanda decides to sacrifice her love as she thinks that Laxmi is more suitable for Ramu. Chanda learns that Madhukar has ordered his goon Gangu to kill Ramu. Gangu always harboured a wish to possess Chanda. Chanda offers to marry Gangu in return of Ramu's life. They secretly get married in the village temple, without telling Ramu and Laxmi. When Ramu learns of the marriage, he is worried and disappointed as Gangu is a bad person.

Madhukar decides to accept his daughter's wish to marry Ramu as he wishes to use this alliance as a way to control Ramu. Jaggu sees Ramu as a threat to his political power. He starts creating doubts in the minds of the villagers regarding Ramu's intentions as he is set to marry Laxmi who is of a higher caste. Ramu wishes to prove to the villagers that he is not using his marriage to further his social status. He decides to marry Bijli, a rape survivor who lost her mental balance as a result of the trauma of rape. This act convinces the villagers of his good intentions. Master Srikant wants to challenge Jaggu's political power by taking part in the election as a candidate, supported by Ramu and the villagers.

Madhukar, angry that Ramu did not marry his daughter, orders Gangu to murder Master Srikant. Jaggu, who had originally orchestrated the rape of Bijli, tells Gangu to abduct Bijli and bring her to him so that he can rape her and put the blame on Madhukar. Gangu injures Master Srikant. Ramu decides to take the injured Srikant to the city for treatment. After Ramu leaves for the city, Bijli is kidnapped by Gangu. Chanda tries to stop Gangu, but he stabs her to death. Bijli commits suicide as she couldn't bear the trauma of being raped again. When Ramu returns to the village, he finds both Chanda and Bijli dead. Laxmi tells him the truth behind their deaths. Ramu decides to take law in his own hands and kills Madhukar, Jaggu, and Gangu. Ramu is sentenced to prison. Laxmi continues his work in educating the villagers.

== Cast ==
- Rajesh Khanna as Ramu
- Jaya Prada as Bijli
- Sridevi as Laxmi
- Padmini Kolhapure as Chanda
- Kader Khan as Hitler Alok Madhukar
- Ranjeet as Gangu
- Om Shivpuri as Jaggu
- Satyendra Kapoor as Master Shrikant
- Jayshree Gadkar as Ramu's Mother
- Dinesh Hingoo as Chief Education Officer

== Music ==
The songs were composed by Bappi Lahiri.

Song	Singer
"Phool Jahan"	Kishore Kumar, Asha Bhosle
"Saaila Aaya"	Kishore Kumar, Asha Bhosle
"Ram Ho Kya"	Kishore Kumar, Asha Bhosle
"Zindagi Ka"	Kishore Kumar, Asha Bhosle
"Yeh Kya Hua, Kya Hua"	Asha Bhosle, S. P. Balasubrahmanyam
