= Buchi Babu (film) =

- Theatrical release poster
- Directed by: Dasari Narayana Rao
- Written by: Dasari Narayana Rao
- Produced by: Venkat Akkineni; Nagarjuna Akkineni
- Starring: Akkineni Nageswara Rao; Jaya Prada
- Cinematography: P. S. Selvaraj
- Edited by: K. Balu
- Music by: Chakravarthy
- Production company: A. A Combines
- Release date: 21 March 1980
- Running time: 155 minuted
- Country: India
- Language: Telugu

Buchi Babu is a 1980 Indian Telugu-language comedy film, produced by Venkat Akkineni, Nagarjuna Akkineni under the Annapurna Studios banner, and directed by Dasari Narayana Rao. It stars Akkineni Nageswara Rao and Jaya Prada, with music composed by Chakravarthy.

== Cast ==
- Akkineni Nageswara Rao as Buchi Babu / Maryada Ramanna
- Jaya Prada as Buchi
- Mohan Babu as V. P. Rao
- Dasari Narayana Rao as Buthula Bapaiah
- Gummadi as Buchi Babu's grandfather
- Prabhakar Reddy as Buchi Babu's father
- Murali Mohan in a cameo appearance
- Raja Babu as Buthula Bapaiah's son
- Chalam as Driver Seetapati
- Raavi Kondala Rao as Varahala Rao
- K. V. Chalam as Jayapapa's husband
- Chalapathi Rao as Geetha's father
- Raja as Rambabu
- Suryakantam as Gundabathula Achchamma
- Pushpalata as Santha
- Sujatha in a Cameo appearance
- Rama Prabha as Hema
- Geetha as Geetha
- Athili Lakshmi as Jayapapa
- Dubbing Janaki as Geetha's mother
- Nirmalamma as Buchi Babu's grandmother
- Master Harish as young Buchi Babu
- Baby Tulasi as young Buchi

== Crew ==
- Art: Bhaskar Raju
- Choreography: Saleem
- Stills: Mohanji - Jaganji
- Playback: S. P. Balasubrahmanyam, P. Susheela, S. P. Sailaja, Madhavapeddi Ramesh, Ramana, Pushpalata
- Music: Chakravarthy
- Editing: K. Balu
- Cinematography: P. S. Selvaraj
- Producer: Venkat Akkineni, Nagarjuna Akkineni
- Story - Screenplay - Dialogues - Lyrics - Director: Dasari Narayana Rao
- Banner: Annapurna Studios
- Release Date: 19 March 1980

== Soundtrack ==
Buchi Babu

Film score by Chakravarthy
- Released: 1980
- Genre: Soundtrack
- Length: 25:54
- Label: SEA Records
- Producer: Chakravarthy

Chakravarthy chronology
Sreevari Muchatlu (1980)	Buchi Babu (1980)	Pilla Zamindar (1980)

Music composed by Chakravarthy. Lyrics were written by Dasari Narayana Rao. Music released on SEA Records Audio Company.

S.No	Song title	Singers	length
1	"Gundabathula Buchamma"	S. P. Balasubrahmanyam	3:10
2	"Kangaarauthondhi"	G. Anand, P. Susheela	4:41
3	"Chandamaama"	Madhavapeddi Ramesh, P. Susheela	4:36
4	"Sitharaala Thotalo"	S. P. Balasubrahmanyam, P. Susheela	3:17
5	"Pasupupacha"	P. Susheela, S. P. Sailaja	3:31
6	"Vaalmiki Intilo"	S. P. Balasubrahmanyam	3:15
7	"Erra Koka Kattinaave"	SP. Balu, Ramana	3:24
