= Adavi Donga =

1985 Telugu film

- Theatrical release poster
- Directed by: K. Raghavendra Rao
- Written by: Paruchuri Brothers (story/dialogues)
- Produced by: Chalasani Gopi
- Starring: Chiranjeevi; Radha; Sarada; Rao Gopal Rao
- Cinematography: K. S. Prakash
- Edited by: D. Venkataratnam
- Music by: Chakravarthy
- Production company: Gopi Art Pictures
- Release date: 19 September 1985
- Country: India
- Language: Telugu

Adavi Donga (transl. Thief of the forest) is a 1985 Indian Telugu-language action drama film directed by K. Raghavendra Rao and produced by Chalasani Gopi. The film stars Chiranjeevi and Radha in lead roles. The plot follows a man raised in the forest by elephants as he seeks justice against a corrupt antagonist exploiting tribal villagers.

The film marked the first collaboration between Chiranjeevi and Raghavendra Rao as a solo lead and featured a soundtrack composed by K. Chakravarthy. Released on 19 September 1985, Adavi Donga was a major commercial success and solidified Chiranjeevi's position as a leading star in Telugu cinema. The film also began a series of successful collaborations between Chiranjeevi and Raghavendra Rao, establishing them as a celebrated actor-director duo in Telugu cinema.

== Plot ==
Viswam (Sreedhar Surapaneni) and his wife Vasundhara (Sarada) are an idealistic couple living near a forest. They are dedicated to educating the illiterate forest dwellers to improve their quality of life and earn a better livelihood. However, their efforts face opposition from Thodella Appala Naidu (Rao Gopal Rao), a local villain who exploits the poor villagers by buying their products at a low cost and selling them at a profit in the nearby town.

When Viswam and Vasundhara help the villagers recognize the value of their products and start selling directly in the town, Appala Naidu attempts to manipulate them into joining his exploitative scheme. When they reject his proposal, he decides to eliminate them. Appala Naidu frames Viswam for the murder of a tribal man and has him arrested. Meanwhile, Vasundhara manages to escape with her baby, Kalidasu (Chiranjeevi), whom she hides in the forest. Kalidasu is discovered and raised by an elephant, growing up alongside the other animals.

Years later, Radhika (Radha), a young woman, visits the forest with her friends and is attacked by Appala Naidu's goons. She is saved by Kalidasu, who later finds her to return a lost radio. The two share a romantic connection, and Radhika soon falls in love with Kalidasu. As she searches for him in the forest, she faces dangers from a tiger and a crocodile, both of which Kalidasu saves her from.

Meanwhile, a group of poachers seeks to capture an elephant but is thwarted by Kalidasu. The poachers frame him for the murder of a police officer, leading to Kalidasu's arrest. During his time in jail, Vasundhara recognizes him as her son due to a tattoo of a Sivalingam on his shoulder. However, Kalidasu is unable to understand or speak to her. Through the elephant calf, he begins to realize that Vasundhara is his mother.

Kalidasu eventually escapes from jail, defeats the police, and is reunited with Vasundhara. She vows to educate him and seek revenge against Appala Naidu. With her guidance, Kalidasu transforms into a legitimate man, and the film culminates in his pursuit of justice and revenge against the villain.

== Cast ==
- Chiranjeevi as Kalidasu
- Radha as Saroja
- Sarada as Vasundhara, Kalidasu's mother
- Sreedhar Surapaneni as Viswam, Kalidasu's father
- Rao Gopal Rao as Thodella Appalanaidu
- Ranganath as Sathish, forest officer
- Jaggayya as Vinod, Vasundhara's brother, Circle Inspector
- Allu Ramalingaiah as Avadhani
- Nutan Prasad as Kondala Naidu
- Chalapathi Rao as Puligadu
- P. L. Narayana as Sureedu
- P. J. Sarma
- Mada Venkateswara Rao
- Narra Venkateswara Rao
- Manik Irani as Rudrayya
- Telephone Satyanarayana
- Chidathala Apparao
- Varalakshmi
- Master Sandesh
- Sakuntala
- Mamatha
- Durga
- Parameswari

== Production ==
Adavi Donga was directed by K. Raghavendra Rao, a filmmaker renowned for delivering visually appealing films with commercial appeal. The film's production was notable for its ambitious scale, including elaborate action sequences and a portrayal of Chiranjeevi in a Tarzan-inspired role.

The film also broke conventions by keeping the lead character silent for the first half of the narrative, which initially raised concerns among fans. However, this approach was ultimately well received.

== Soundtrack ==
K. Chakravarthy composed the music of the film.

- "Challagali"
- "Idhi Oka Nanadanavanamu"
- "Om Namasivaya"
- "Vana Vana Vandanam"
- "Veera Vikrama"

== Release ==
Adavi Donga was released on 19 September 1985. In Hyderabad, the film premiered in four prominent theaters—Devi, Satyam, Konark, and Jyothi. It made history by screening five shows in these theaters on the day of release, the first time such an event occurred in the city.

== Reception ==
Adavi Donga received an overwhelmingly positive response from audiences and critics alike. The film grossed ₹84 lakh in its opening week, a significant achievement for the era. Its box-office performance placed it on par with films of leading actors of the time, including Krishna, who was then considered a major star.

The film's success proved Chiranjeevi's ability to carry big-budget films, attracting producers who were willing to invest in large-scale projects with him as the lead. It solidified his stardom, competing with the industry's established stars like Krishna. The film also marked the beginning of his collaboration with director K. Raghavendra Rao, which would continue to produce successful ventures in the future.
