= Simha Baludu =

- Theatrical poster
- Directed by: K. Raghavendra Rao
- Screenplay by: K. Raghavendra Rao
- Story by: D. V. Narasa Raju
- Produced by: D. Sriranga Raju
- Starring: N. T. Rama Rao; Vanisri
- Cinematography: Kannappa
- Edited by: K. A. Marthand
- Music by: M. S. Viswanathan
- Production company: Tirupathi Productions
- Release date: 11 August 1978
- Running time: 159 minutes
- Country: India
- Language: Telugu

Simha Baludu (transl. A Man with Lion's Power) is a 1978 Indian Telugu-language swashbuckler film written and directed by K. Raghavendra Rao from a story by D. V. Narasa Raju. It stars N. T. Rama Rao and Vanisri, with music composed by M. S. Viswanathan. The film was released on 11 August 1978 to negative reviews and despite the grand opening ended up as a box-office bomb.

== Cast ==
- N. T. Rama Rao as Rajendra
- Vanisri as Vani
- Rao Gopal Rao as Maharaju
- Satyanarayana as Raghunatha Nayakudu
- Mohan Babu as Gajapathi
- Tyagaraju as Bhanoji
- Mada as Govindu
- Sarathi as Vikata Kavi
- P. J. Sarma as Mahamantri
- Kakarala
- Jagga Rao
- Anjali Devi as Bhagyam
- Rama Prabha
- Jayamalini as Rani Rana Chandi
- Halam as item number
- Pallavi as Seeta

== Soundtrack ==
Simha Baludu

Film score by M. S. Viswanathan
- Released: 1978
- Genre: Soundtrack
- Length: 23:08
- Label: His Master's Voice
- Producer: M. S. Viswanathan

Music composed by M. S. Viswanathan. Lyrics were written by Veturi.

S. No	Song title	Singers	length
1	"Endammo Churukkumandhi"	S. P. Balasubrahmanyam, P. Susheela	4:16
2	"Chupulatho Udakesi"	S. P. Balasubrahmanyam, P. Susheela	4:34
3	"Sannajajuloo"	S. P. Balasubrahmanyam, L.R.Eswari	4:35
4	"O Cheli Chali"	S. P. Balasubrahmanyam, P. Susheela	5:09
5	"Ee Ganta Gana Gana"	P. Susheela	4:34
