= Circus Ramudu =

- Theatrical release poster
- Directed by: Dasari Narayana Rao
- Screenplay by: Dasari Narayana Rao
- Story by: R. K. Dharmaraju
- Produced by: Kovai Chezhiyan
- Starring: N. T. Rama Rao; Jaya Prada
- Cinematography: Kannappa
- Edited by: K. Balu
- Music by: K. V. Mahadevan
- Production company: K. C. Films International
- Release date: 1 March 1980
- Running time: 152 minutes
- Country: India
- Language: Telugu

Circus Ramudu is a 1980 Indian Telugu-language action drama film, produced by Kovai Chezhiyan on K. C. Films banner and directed by Dasari Narayana Rao. It stars N. T. Rama Rao, Jaya Prada and music composed by K. V. Mahadevan.

== Cast ==
- N. T. Rama Rao as Ramu & Raja (dual role)
- Jaya Prada as Jaya
- Sujatha as Ankamma
- Rao Gopal Rao as Bhaskar Rao
- Allu Ramalingaiah as Circus Owner Chalapathi Rao
- Mohan Babu as Sambaiah
- Prabhakar Reddy as Lawyer Yugandhar
- Tyagaraju as Zamindar Koteswara Rao
- K.V.Chalam as Paul
- Savitri as Janaki Devi
- Jayamalini as Jayamalini
- Jhansi as Tayaramma

== Soundtrack ==
Music composed by K. V. Mahadevan. Lyrics were written by Veturi.

Song title	Singers	length
"Ramudante Ramudu"	S. P. Balasubrahmanyam	4:23
"Galgal Galmandi"	S. P. Balasubrahmanyam, P. Susheela	3:08
"Aaakali Meedha"	S. P. Balasubrahmanyam, S. Janaki	3:12
"O Bojja Ganapaiah"	S. P. Balasubrahmanyam, P. Susheela	3:25
"Akka Chellelu"	S. P. Balasubrahmanyam, S. Janaki	3:04
"Suridu Sukkhitukundi"	S. P. Balasubrahmanyam, Vani Jayaram	3:21
"Amavasyaki Punnamiki"	S. P. Balasubrahmanyam	2:54
