= Rama Krishnulu =

- Theatrical release poster
- Directed by: V. B. Rajendra Prasad
- Written by: Acharya Aatreya(dialogues)
- Screenplay by: V. B. Rajendra Prasad
- Story by: Guhanathan
- Produced by: V. B. Rajendra Prasad
- Starring: N. T. Rama Rao; Akkineni Nageswara Rao; Jayasudha; Jaya Prada
- Cinematography: V. S. R. Swamy
- Edited by: A. Sanjeevi
- Music by: K. V. Mahadevan
- Production company: Jagapathi Art Pictures
- Distributed by: Annapurna Studios
- Release date: 8 June 1978
- Running time: 161 mins
- Country: India
- Language: Telugu

Rama Krishnulu is a 1978 Indian Telugu-language action drama film, produced and directed by V. B. Rajendra Prasad under his Jagapathi Art Pictures banner. It stars N. T. Rama Rao, Akkineni Nageswara Rao, Jayasudha and Jaya Prada, with music composed by K. V. Mahadevan. The film borrows shades of the Hindi film Hera Pheri (1976).

== Cast ==
- N. T. Rama Rao as Ramu
- Akkineni Nageswara Rao as Krishna
- Jaya Prada as Jaya
- Jayasudha as Lakshmi
- Satyanarayana as Kondandam
- Mohan Babu as Thyagaraju
- Allu Ramalingaiah as Jaya's father
- Raja Babu as Jaya's brother
- Jaggayya as Sakshala Sub-Inspector Satyanandam
- Kanta Rao as Ramanandam
- Anjali Devi as Chandramathi
- Pushpalatha as Meenakshi
- Dhulipala as Baba
- Mukkamala as I.G.
- K. V. Chalam as Lakshmi's brother
- Sarath Babu as Nagaraju
- Chalapathi Rao as Jaggu

== Soundtrack ==
Rama Krishnulu

Film score by K. V. Mahadevan
- Released: 1978
- Genre: Soundtrack
- Length: 26:27
- Label: EMI Columbia Audio Company
- Producer: K. V. Mahadevan

K. V. Mahadevan chronology
KD No: 1 (1978)	Rama Krishnulu (1978)	Chilipi Krishnudu (1978)

Music composed by K. V. Mahadevan. Lyrics were written by Acharya Aatreya.

S. No	Song title	Singers	length
1	"Abbabbabbo Aadavaallu"	S. P. Balasubrahmanyam, P. Susheela, Vani Jayaram, V. Ramakrishna	5:24
2	"Kanne Evaro"	S. P. Balasubrahmanyam, V. Ramakrishna	5:23
3	"Hare Rama Hare Krishna"	S. P. Balasubrahmanyam, P. Susheela, Vani Jayaram, V. Ramakrishna	3:03
4	"Navanavalade Chinnadana"	S. P. Balasubrahmanyam, P. Susheela	3:12
5	"Duppatlo Dooraaka"	V. Ramakrishna, P. Susheela	3:07
6	"Jhuy Jhuy Antunte"	S. P. Balasubrahmanyam, V. Ramakrishna	3:08
7	"Aadanaa Paadanaa"	P. Susheela, Vani Jayaram	3:10
