= Jaya Prada =

Indian actress and politician (born 1962)

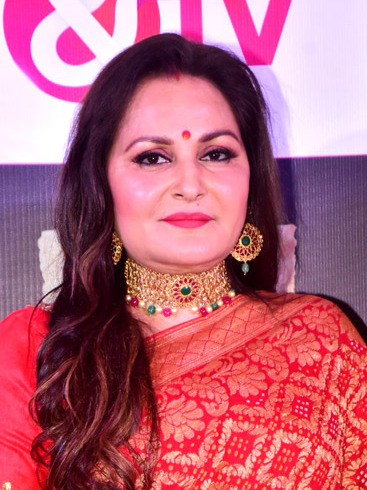
- Prada in 2019

Member of Parliament, Lok Sabha
- In office 13 May 2004 – 16 May 2014
- Preceded by: Noor Bano
- Succeeded by: Naipal Singh
- Constituency: Rampur. Uttar Pradesh

Member of Parliament, Rajya Sabha
- In office 10 April 1996 – 9 April 2002
- Preceded by: R. K. Dhawan
- Succeeded by: SM Laljan Basha
- Constituency: Andhra Pradesh

Personal details
- Born: Lalita Rani; 3 April 1962 (age 64) Rajahmundry, Andhra Pradesh, India
- Party: Bharatiya Janata Party (since 2019)
- Other political affiliations: Telugu Desam Party (until 2004); Samajwadi Party (2004–2010); Rashtriya Lok Dal (2014–2019)
- Spouse: Srikanth Nahata (m. 1986) (separated)
- Children: 1 (adopted)
- Occupation: Actress; politician

Jaya Prada Nahata (born Lalitha Rani Rao; 3 April 1962) is an Indian politician and actress, known for her works in Telugu cinema and Hindi cinema as well as in Tamil films in the late '70s, '80s and early '90s and 2000s. Jayaprada is the recipient of three Filmfare Awards South and has starred in many Telugu and Hindi films along with several Kannada, Tamil, Malayalam, Bengali and Marathi films. She left the film industry at the peak of her career, as she joined the Telugu Desam Party (TDP) in 1994 and entered politics. She was a Member of Parliament (MP) from Rampur, Uttar Pradesh from 2004 to 2014.

Some of her notable films include Anthuleni Katha (1976), Siri Siri Muvva (1976), Sita Kalyanam (1976), Adavi Ramudu (1977), Yamagola (1977), Sanaadi Appanna (1977), Huliya Haalina Mevu (1979), Sargam (1979), Ooriki Monagadu (1981), Kaamchor (1982), Kaviratna Kalidasa (1983), Sagara Sangamam (1983), Tohfa (1984), Sharaabi (1984), Maqsad (1984), Sanjog (1985), Aakhree Raasta (1986), Simhasanam (1986), Muddat (1986), Sindoor (1987), Samsaram (1988), Elaan-E-Jung (1989), Aaj Ka Arjun (1990), Thanedaar (1990), Maa (1991), Habba (1999), Shabdavedhi (2000), Devadoothan (2000), Pranayam (2011), Ee Bandhana (2007) and Krantiveera Sangolli Rayanna (2012). She won the Filmfare Award for Best Actress – Telugu for her performance in Sagara Sangamam. She has also been awarded Filmfare Special Award for her performance in Siri Siri Muvva and Anthuleni Katha.

Prada has been considered by many as the most beautiful faces to have ever graced Indian cinema including Satyajit Ray who called her "the most beautiful face on the Indian screen".

== Early life ==
Jayaprada was born Lalitha Rani Rao in a Telugu family in Rajahmundry, Andhra Pradesh. Her father, Krishna Rao, was a Telugu film financier. Her mother, Neelaveni, was a home-maker. Lalitha attended a Telugu medium school in Rajahmundry and was also enrolled in dance and music classes at an early age.

== Film career ==
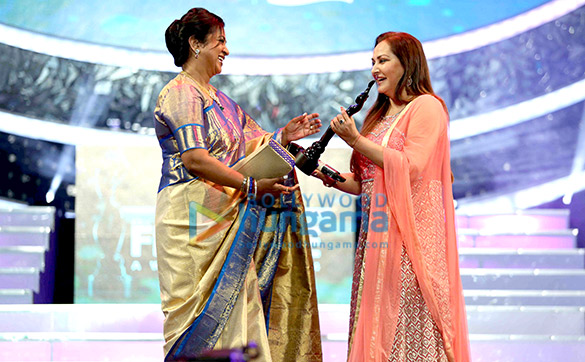
Jayaprada with actress Radhika at 62nd Filmfare Awards South.

When she was a teenager, she performed a dance at her school's annual function. A film director in the audience offered her a three-minute dance number in the Telugu film Bhoomi Kosam (1974). She was hesitant, but her family encouraged her to accept it. She was paid only 10 rupees for her work in the film, but the rushes of those three minutes of film were shown to the major figures of the Telugu film industry. Major filmmakers offered her starring roles in quality films, and she accepted them. Character actor, M.Prabhakar Reddy gave Jaya Prada her screen name and introduced her to the film industry in 1976 . ( wikipedia +1) She became a huge star in 1976 with major hit films. Director K. Balachander's black-and-white film Anthuleni Katha (1976) showcased her dramatic skills; K. Viswanath's colour film Siri Siri Muvva (1976) showed her playing a mute girl with excellent dancing skills; and her title role as Sita in the big-budget mythological film Seetha Kalyanam (1976) confirmed her versatility. In 1977, she starred in Adavi Ramudu, which broke box office records and which permanently cemented her star status. The song "Aaresukoboyi Paresukunnanu" performed by Prada and co-star N.T. Rama Rao (NTR) became a mass hit. Important filmmakers were casting her and repeating her in their films. Filmmaker Vijay introduced her to Kannada cinema in his 1977 super-hit movie Sanaadi Appanna alongside Kannada matinee idol Dr. Rajkumar. The movie is also known to be the only movie to feature shehnai rendition by Ustad Bismillah Khan. She further acted with the Kannada matinee idol in super hits like Kaviratna Kalidasa in 1983 and Shabdavedhi in 2000.

In 1979, K. Balachander repeated her in the Tamil film Ninaithale Inikkum opposite Kamal Haasan and Rajinikanth in which she played a terminally-ill patient. She continued to act in more films in Telugu opposite actors such as NTR, ANR, Krishna, Krishnam Raju and Sobhan Babu throughout the 70s and 80s. She acted in highest number of films with Krishna like Sri Rajeshwari vilas coffee club (1976), Bhale Krishnudu (1980), Ooruki Monagadu (1981), Mundadugu (1983), Prajarajyam (1983) and Singhasan (1986). K. Viswanath remade Siri Siri Muvva (1976) in Hindi as Sargam, introducing Jayaprada to Bollywood in 1979. The film was successful and she became a star there as well. She earned her first Filmfare nomination as Best Actress but couldn't capitalise on her success since she couldn't speak Hindi.

In 1981, she starred in the critically acclaimed Tamil film 47 Natkal and simultaneously made Telugu film 47 Rojulu by filmmaker K. Balachander in which Chiranjeevi played her villainous, bigamist husband. After she took Hindi lessons, director K. Vishwanath relaunched her in Hindi films, with Kaamchor where she spoke Hindi fluently for the first time. Saagara Sangamam directed by K. Vishwanath, starring Kamal Haasan proved to be a milestone in her career, winning her many accolades including Filmfare Award for Best Actress - Telugu in 1983. She was now able to consistently work in Hindi films, and earned two more Filmfare nominations as Best Actress for playing Amitabh Bachchan's endearing girlfriend in Prakash Mehra's Sharaabi (1984) and for her challenging double role in K. Vishwanath's Sanjog (1985).

Jayaprada made a successful team not just with Amitabh Bachchan and Jeetendra, but also with her immediate screen rival Sridevi, with whom she has acted in about a dozen films. Their hit Telugu film Devatha (1982), where they played sisters who made huge sacrifices for each other, was remade into the hit Hindi film Tohfa (1984). These films endeared Jayaprada to the traditional conservative section of film goers and she amassed a huge female fan following as well. It was an image that would serve her well when she started a new career as a politician. In 1985, she acted in the Malayalam film Iniyum Kadha Thudarum directed by Joshiy starring Mammootty, Baby Shalini and Ambika.

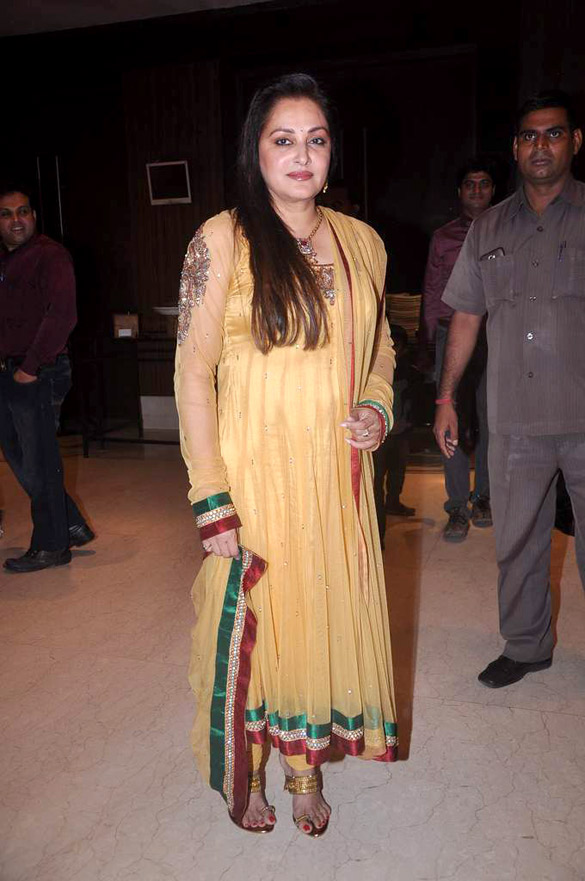
Jayaprada at the launch of T P Aggarwal's trade magazine Blockbuster

Jayaprada continued to act as a heroine mainly opposite Amitabh and Jeetendra during the early 1990s. She also acted in some significant Kannada films as the heroine. From 1994 onwards, she cut back on film assignments and got more involved with a political career on call by her co-star NTR.

In 2000, she acted in the Malayalam film Devadoothan, starring Mohanlal, directed by Sibi Malayil. The film garnered immensely popular reviews from the critics but failed at the box office. But it met with great appreciation from the audience when released in Home Media and when aired on television. his movie had evergreen hit songs. She also starred for the last time, opposite Kannada super star Dr. Rajkumar in Shabdavedi. In 2002, she stepped into the Marathi film industry by being a guest in the movie Aadhaar. Thus far, she has acted in eight languages and has completed 300 films during a 30-year film career. In 2004, she acted in Ee Snehatheerathu, a Malayalam film as Kunchacko Boban's mother. She started playing mature roles.

She also owns the Jayaprada Theater in Chennai.

In 2011, she returned to Malayalam cinema with a strong role in Pranayam, alongside Mohanlal and Anupam Kher. She played "Grace" in this film, which won her critical acclaim and several awards. Her 2012 Kannada film Krantiveera Sangolli Rayanna that saw her donning the historical role of courageous Kittur Chennamma, completed 100 days at the box office.

== Personal life ==
On 22 February 1986, she married producer Srikanth Nahata, who was already married to Chandra and had two children. This marriage stirred a lot of controversy, especially since Nahata did not divorce his wife and had a child with his first wife after marrying Jayaprada. In a 2026 interview, she said that she regretted her marriage and moved out.

== Political career ==
Jayaprada joined the Telugu Desam Party (TDP) in 1994 at the invitation of its founder N. T. Rama Rao, on the eve of the assembly elections, and rose quickly through the ranks. At that time there was speculation that she would run for election, but she preferred not to make her electoral debut, although she was offered a seat by Rao.

She campaigned in several constituencies in 1994. When Rao became the Chief minister in 1994, he appointed one of his sons-in-law Nara Chandrababu Naidu as the Revenue Minister. After Lakshmi Parvati, wife of NTR started interfering in politics several TDP leaders revolted against NTR. When all TDP leaders have met in Viceroy hotel, NTR went to convince them along with Lakshmi Parvati, which ended up TDP leaders throwing slippers on Lakshmi Parvati and NTR went between, followed by No Confidence Motion NTR was thrown out of power. Since most of the legislators had gone over to his side, the Anti Defection Law did not apply and the Telugu Desam Party label passed on to the Chandrababu Naidu side. During this period, Prada too joined the Chandrababu Naidu party. She was nominated to the Rajya Sabha representing Andhra Pradesh in 1996. She also held the post of Telugu Mahila President.

Following differences with party Supremo N. Chandrababu Naidu, she left the TDP to join Samajwadi Party. She contested from Rampur parliamentary Constituency in UP during the 2004 General election and got elected with a margin of more than 85000 votes. During her campaign for the Lok Sabha elections in 2009, she was issued a notice by the Election Commission for violating the code of conduct by distributing bindis to women in Rampur's Swar locality. On 11 May 2009, Jayaprada alleged that senior Samajwadi Party leader Azam Khan was distributing nude pictures of her. She was re-elected with a margin of more than 30,000 votes.

After she came out in open support of the former General Secretary of the Samajwadi Party, Amar Singh, Prada was expelled from the party on 2 February 2010 for allegedly indulging in anti-party activities and damaging the party's secular image. Amar Singh, along with Jayaprada floated his own political party, Rashtriya Lok Manch, in 2011, and fielded candidates in 360 of the 403 seats in Uttar Pradesh in the 2012 assembly polls. However, his party did not win a single seat in these elections. Later she, along with Amar Singh joined the RLD on 10 March 2014 and after that she got the ticket to contest from the Bijnor seat in the 2014 general elections. She, however, lost the election.

She joined the Bharatiya Janata Party in the presence of National General Secretary Bhupender Yadav on 26 March 2019. In March 2025, the Moradabad MP-MLA Court issued a non-bailable warrant against her in connection with a case involving senior Samajwadi Party leader Azam Khan.

== Artistry and legacy ==
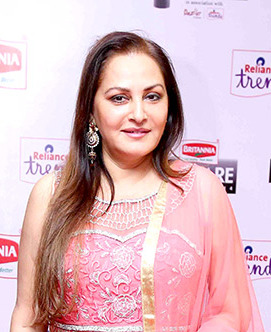
Jaya Prada in 2015

Jayaprada is regarded as one of the greatest and extremely beautiful actresses of Indian cinema. Indian director Satyajit Ray described her as one of the prettiest women in the world. Although she has acted in Bengali films, she has never worked for Ray. (She claimed that Ray had her in mind for a film, but his illness and subsequent death prevented their collaboration). In 2022, she was placed in Outlook India's "75 Best Bollywood Actresses" list. One of the highest paid actress of 1980s and 1990s, both in Hindi and Telugu films, Jayaprada appeared in Box Office India's "Top Actresses" list 10 times from 1984 to 1993 and topped of the list 3 times ranked first thrice (1984 to 1986), she was placed 5th in its "All Time Top Actresses" list and she topped its top actresses list from 1979-1994.

Writing for Filmfare, Devesh Sharma termed her as one of the "top commercial great actresses" of her era. On her Hindi debut he added, "Jaya Prada became an overnight sensation after the release of Sargam. Her classical beauty got compared to Ajanta statues and nymph of heaven. She bedazzled the Hindi film audience with her classical-based dances." Neeraja Murthy of The Hindu noted, "For over four decades, Jaya Prada has been the quintessential glamourous [sic] greatest megastar setting hearts aflutter on screen." Nibandh Vinod of News18 noted, "Jaya Prada, ruled the industry with her charm, graceful dance skills and nuanced acting chops." Filmmaker Satyajit Ray called Jayaprada as "the most beautiful face on the Indian screen". In the 2019 biopic film NTR: Kathanayakudu, actress Hansika Motwani portrayed Jaya Prada onscreen.

== Filmography ==
Year	Title	Role	Language		
1974	Bhoomi Kosam	Chelli Chandramma	Telugu		
1975	Naaku Swatantram Vachindi		Telugu		
1976	Manmatha Leelai	Kannagi	Tamil		
1976	Anthuleni Katha	Sarita	Telugu		
1976	Sri Rajeswari Vilas Coffee Club	Rajeswari	Telugu		
1976	Siri Siri Muvva	Hyma	Telugu		
1976	Seeta Kalyanam	Seeta and Goddess Lakshmi	Telugu		
1976	Prema Bandham		Telugu		
1976	Mangalyaniki Maromudi		Telugu		
1977	Bhadrakali	Gayathri	Telugu		
1977	Adavi Ramudu	Padma	Telugu		
1977	Seetha Rama Vanavasam	Sita	Telugu		
1977	Kurukshetram	Uttara	Telugu		
1977	Andame Aanandam	Padma	Telugu		
1977	Eenati Bandham Enatido		Telugu		
1977	Chanakya Chandragupta	Aasa	Telugu		
1977	Yamagola	Savithri	Telugu		
1977	Sanaadi Appanna	Basanti	Kannada		
1977	Eetharam Manishi		Telugu		
1977	Jeevitha Nauka		Telugu		
1977	Dongalaku Donga	Sunitha	Telugu		
1977	Maa Iddari Katha	Seeta	Telugu		
1977	Chakradhari	Manju	Telugu		
1978	Nayudu Bava	Malli	Telugu		
1978	Athani Kante Ghanudu		Telugu		
1978	Agent Gopi	Latha	Telugu		
1978	Dongala Veta		Telugu		
1978	Rama Krishnulu	Jaya	Telugu		
1978	Devadasu Malli Puttadu	Shanthi	Telugu		
1978	Melu Kolupu	Susheela	Telugu		
1978	Rajaputra Rahasyam	Priyadarshini	Telugu		
1978	Radhakrishna	Radha	Telugu		
1978	Kumara Raja		Telugu		
1979	Sargam	Hema Pradhan	Hindi		
1979	Huliya Haalina Mevu	Poovi	Kannada		
1979	Ninaithale Inikkum	Sona	Tamil		
1979	Andamaina Anubhavam	Sona	Telugu		
1979	Lok Parlok	Savithri	Hindi		
1979	Rangoon Rowdy	Indu/Rajani	Telugu		
1979	Dongalaku Saval	Rekha	Telugu		
1979	Kotta Alludu		Telugu		
1979	Sri Tirupati Venkateswara Kalyanam	Goddess Padmavati	Telugu		
1979	Mande Gundelu		Telugu		
1980	Challenge Ramudu	Aruna	Telugu		
1980	Bhale Krishnudu	Ratti	Telugu		
1980	Superman	Jaya	Telugu		
1980	Buchchi Babu	Buchi	Telugu		
1980	Bandodu Gundamma		Telugu		
1980	Takkar	Ganga	Hindi		
1980	Allari Bava		Telugu		
1980	Sita Ramulu	Sita	Telugu		
1980	Circus Ramudu		Telugu		
1980	Chandipriya	Chandipriya	Telugu		
1980	Ragile Hrudayalu	Seethalu	Telugu		
1980	Chesina Baasalu		Telugu		
1980	Dharm Chakram		Telugu		
1980	Sannaayi Appanna		Telugu		
1980	Kottapeta Rowdy	Radha	Telugu		
1981	Srivari Muchatlu	Radha	Telugu		
1981	Taxi Driver	Rani/Jaya	Telugu		
1981	Rahasya Goodachari		Telugu		
1981	47 Natkal	Vaishali	Tamil		
1981	47 Rojulu	Vaishali	Telugu		
1981	Ooruki Monagadu	Rekha	Telugu		
1981	Jatagadu		Telugu		
1981	Ragile Jwala	Vani	Telugu		
1981	Agni Poolu	Rukmini	Telugu		
1981	Prema Mandiram	Madhura Ranjani	Telugu		
1981	Girija Kalyanam	Girija	Telugu		
1981	Deepaaraadhana		Telugu		
1982	Madhura Swapnam		Telugu		
1982	Kaamchor	Geeta Sanghvi	Hindi		
1982	Baawri	Gayatri	Hindi		
1982	Talli Kodukula Anubandham		Telugu		
1982	Pagabattina Simham		Telugu		
1982	Meghasandesam	Padma	Telugu		
1982	Jagannatha Rathachakralu	Radha	Telugu		
1982	Dil-e-Nadaan	Asha	Hindi		
1982	Swayamvaram		Telugu		
1982	Nivuru Gappina Nippu	Rekha	Telugu		
1982	Devata	Janaki	Telugu		
1982	Krishnarjunulu		Telugu		
1982	Pralaya Rudrudu	Jaya	Telugu		
1982	Golconda Abbulu		Telugu		
1983	Sagara Sangamam	Madhavi	Telugu		
1983	Nijam Chepithe Nerama	Rajani	Telugu		
1983	Qayamat	Geeta	Hindi		
1983	Mawaali	Nisha Verma	Hindi		
1983	Mundadugu	Padma	Telugu		
1983	Kaviratna Kalidasa	Vidyadhare and Shakuntala	Kannada		
1983	Adavi Simhalu	Lalita	Telugu		
1983	Puli Bebbuli	Sita	Telugu		
1983	Siripuram Monagadu		Telugu		
1983	Amarajeevi	Lalita	Telugu		
1983	Main Awara Hoon	Bela	Hindi		
1983	Praja Rajyam		Telugu		
1984	Sardar	Vijaya	Telugu		
1984	Tohfa	Janki	Hindi		
1984	Tandava Krishnudu	Vani	Telugu		
1984	Dharm Aur Qanoon	Shanta	Hindi		
1984	Yuddham		Telugu		
1984	Mera Faisla	Nisha Dhawan	Hindi		
1984	Sharaabi	Meena	Hindi		
1984	Maqsad	Rani	Hindi		
1984	Naya Kadam	Bijlee	Hindi		
1984	Haisiyat	Sita	Hindi		
1984	Awaaz	Anu	Hindi		
1984	Bangaru Kapuram	Jaya	Telugu		
1984	Sampoorna Premayanam	Prema	Telugu		
1984	Sangeeta Samrat	Radha	Telugu		
1984	Nayakulaku Saval	Chaithanya	Telugu		
1985	Pataal Bhairavi	Rajkumari Indumati Singh	Hindi		
1985	Maha Sangramam		Telugu		
1985	Maha Manishi		Telugu		
1985	Surya Chandra	Pooja	Telugu		
1985	Sanjog	Yashoda & Asha	Hindi		
1985	Hoshiyar	Radha	Hindi		
1985	Zabardast	Mala Saigal	Hindi		
1985	Iniyum Katha Thudarum	Nimmi	Malayalam		
1985	Haqeeqat	Bharti	Hindi		
1985	Sur Sangam		Hindi		
1985	Mera Saathi	Raagini	Hindi		
1986	Krishna Garadi		Telugu		
1986	Tandra Paparayudu	Jyothirmai	Telugu		
1986	Singhasan	Alaknanda Devi	Hindi		
1986	Simhasanam	Alaknanda Devi	Telugu		
1986	Veta		Telugu		
1986	Aakhree Raasta	Mary D'Costa	Hindi		
1986	Swarag Se Sunder	Laxmi Choudhary	Hindi		
1986	Muddat	Bharti	Hindi		
1986	Pyaar Ke Do Pal	Geeta	Hindi		
1986	Aisa Pyaar Kahan	Sarita	Hindi		
1986	Ugra Narasimham	Jyothi	Telugu		
1987	Aulad	Yashoda	Hindi		
1987	Majaal	Sandhya	Hindi		
1987	Thene Manasulu	Rukmini	Telugu		
1987	Viswanatha Nayakudu	Kalavati	Telugu		
1987	Insaaf Kaun Karega	Sitara Devi	Hindi		
1987	Sindoor	Laxmi	Hindi		
1988	Mardon Wali Baat	Asha	Hindi		
1988	Samsaram	Padmavathi	Telugu		
1988	Rocky		Telugu		
1988	Ganga Tere Desh Mein	Dr.Asha	Hindi		
1988	Gangaa Jamunaa Saraswati	Saraswati	Hindi		
1988	Ghar Ghar Ki Kahani	Sita	Hindi		
1988	Kaliyuga Karnudu	Lakshmi	Telugu		
1989	Jaadugar	Meena	Hindi		
1989	Main Tera Dushman	Jaya	Hindi		
1989	Souten Ki Beti	Rukmini	Hindi		
1989	Elaan-E-Jung	Reema	Hindi		
1989	Atha Mechina Alludu	Jaya	Telugu		
1989	Kanoon Ki Awaaz	Janki Rai	Hindi		
1989	Paraya Ghar		Hindi		
1989	Hum Bhi Insaan Hain	Radha	Hindi		
1989	Gharana	Naina	Hindi		
1989	Sumangali		Telugu		
1990	Majboor	Sharda	Hindi		
1990	Zakhmi Zameen	Radha	Hindi		
1990	Aaj Ka Arjun	Gauri	Hindi		
1990	Thanedaar	Sudha	Hindi		
1990	Ekalavya		Kannada		
1990	Nyay Anyay	Rama Khanna	Hindi		
1991	Indrajeet	Shanti Devi	Hindi		
1991	Veerta	Shalu	Hindi		
1991	Maa	Mamta	Hindi		
1991	Farishtay	Special appearance	Hindi		
1992	Tyagi	Mrs. Parvati Dayal	Hindi		
1992	Aathma Bandhana	Shanti	Kannada		
1993	Insaniyat Ke Devta		Hindi		
1993	Manikantana Mahime	Kamala	Kannada		
1993	Ezhai Jaathi	Thilakavathi	Tamil		
1993	Kundan	Jyothi	Hindi		
1993	Dhartiputra		Hindi		
1993	Khal-Naaikaa	Jaya Ravi Kapoor	Hindi		
1994	Insaniyat	Shalu / Champabai	Hindi		
1994	Jeevitha Khaidi	Bhargavi	Telugu		
1994	Chauraha	Pooja	Hindi		
1995	Himapatha	Nayana	Kannada		
1995	Maidan-E-Jung	Lakshma	Hindi		
1995	Paappi Devataa	Rosie	Hindi		
1996	Pellala Rajyam	Parvati	Telugu		
1997	Jeevan Yudh	Rani	Hindi		
1997	Prema Geethe	Radha	Kannada		
1997	Lav Kush	Seeta	Hindi		
1998	Aami Sei Meye		Bengali		
1999	Velugu Needalu		Telugu		
1999	Lohpurush	Aarti	Hindi		
1999	Habba	Vishnu's Wife	Kannada		
2000	Devadoothan	Angelina Ignatious / Aleena	Malayalam		
2000	Aadhar		Marathi		
2000	Shabdavedhi	Vatsala	Kannada		
2002	Chandravamsam	Dharma Raju's wife	Telugu		
2003	Sri Renukadevi	Jogamma	Kannada		
2004	Khakee	Jaya Srivastav	Hindi		
2004	Ee Snehatheerathu	Lakshmi	Malayalam		
2006	Tathastu	Dr. Nita	Hindi		
2007	Ee Bandhana	Nandini	Kannada		
2007	Maharathi	Chamundeshwari	Telugu		
2007	Deha	Sandhya Joshi/Sandhya Desai	Hindi		
2008	Dasavathaaram	Ranjitha Kaur	Tamil		
2009	Sesh Sangat		Bengali		
2009	Raaj The Showman	Cameo	Kannada		
2010	The Desire	Gautmi's mother	Hindi-English; Chinese		
2011	Pranayam	Grace	Malayalam		
2012	Krantiveera Sangolli Rayanna	Kittur Chennamma	Kannada		
2013	Rajjo	Janki Devi	Hindi		
2018	Kinar	Indira	Malayalam		
2018	Keni	Indira	Tamil		
2018	Sarabha	Parvathamma	Telugu	Tanaj	Bengali
2023	Suvarna Sundari	Vishalakshi	Telugu		
2023	Ramachandra Boss & Co	Salma Ram	Malayalam		
2026	Hirak Ranir Deshe		Bengali		

== Television ==
Year	Title	Role	Notes	Ref(s).
	Jayapradam	Host		
2018	Perfect Pati	Rajyashri Rathore		
2021	The Kapil Sharma Show season 2	Herself as guest along with Raj Babbar and team for Punjabi movie promotion		
2021	Indian Idol	Herself		
2022	Sasural Simar Ka 2	Herself	Cameo appearance	
2022	Hunarbaaz: Desh Ki Shaan	Herself	Guest appearance	
2023	Drama Juniors 4 Telugu	Herself as judge		

== Awards and nominations ==
Nandi Awards

- Best Actress – Anthuleni Katha (1976)
- Best Actress – Meghasandesam (1982)

Filmfare Awards South

- Special Award – Siri Siri Muvva & Anthuleni Katha (1976)
- Best Actress – Telugu – Saagara Sangamam (1983)
- Lifetime Achievement Award – South (2007)
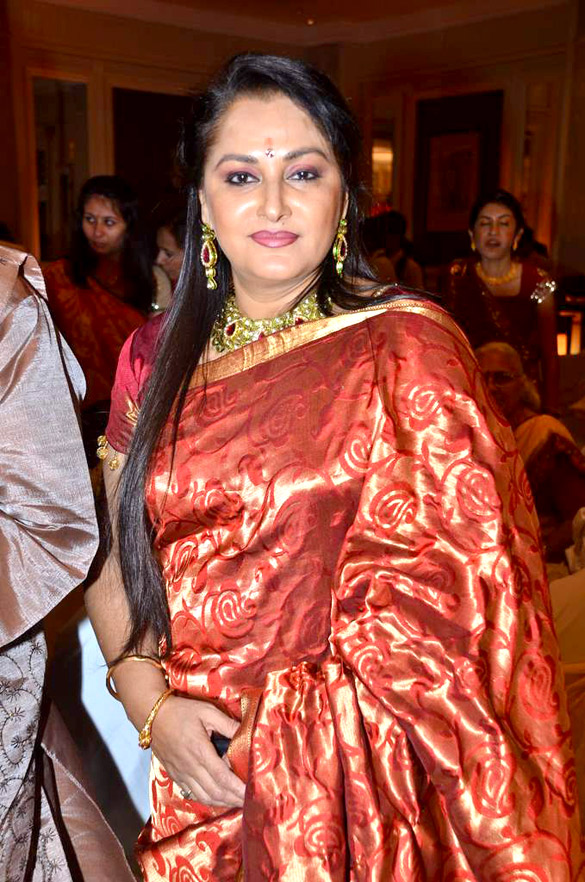
  JayaPrada was given Filmfare Lifetime Achievement Award (South) in 2007.

Filmfare Awards

Year	Artist/Work	Category	Language	Outcome
1979	Sargam	Best Actress	Hindi	Nominated
1984	Sharaabi	Best Actress	Hindi	Nominated
1985	Sanjog	Best Actress	Hindi	Nominated

=== Filmfare Awards South ===
Year	Artist/Work	Category	Language	Outcome
1976	Anthuleni Katha	Best Actress	Telugu	Nominated
1976	Siri Siri Muvva	Best Actress	Telugu	Nominated
1976	Anthuleni Katha,Siri Siri Muvva	Special Jury Award	Telugu	Won
1979	Ninaithale Inikkum	Best Actress	Tamil	Nominated
1980	Chandipriya	Best Actress	Telugu	Nominated
1981	47 Rojulu	Best Actress	Telugu	Nominated
1982	Meghasandesam	Best Actress	Telugu	Nominated
1983	Sagara Sangamam	Best Actress	Telugu	Won
1984	Sampoorna Premayanam	Best Actress	Telugu	Nominated
2000	Devadoothan	Best Actress	Malayalam	Nominated
2007	Overall Contribution to Telugu Film Industry	Lifetime Achievement Award	Telugu	Won
2011	Pranayam	Best Actress	Malayalam	Nominated
2012	Krantiveera Sangolli Rayanna	Best Supporting Actress	Kannada	Nominated

Other awards

- Uttam Kumar Award
- ANR Achievement Award (2008)
- Venus of Indian Cinema Award from TSR TV9 Film Awards (2011)

Lok Sabha
Preceded by Noor Bano	Member of Parliament for Rampur; 2004–2014	Succeeded by Dr. Nepal Singh
Rajya Sabha
Preceded by N/A	Member of Parliament for Rajya Sabha Andhra Pradesh; 1996–2002	Succeeded by N/A
