= Prema Kanuka =

- Theatrical release poster
- Directed by: K. Raghavendra Rao
- Written by: Satyanand (dialogues)
- Screenplay by: K. Raghavendra Rao
- Story by: Guhanathan
- Produced by: Venkat Akkineni; Nagarjuna Akkineni
- Starring: Akkineni Nageswara Rao; Sridevi
- Cinematography: K. S. Prakash
- Edited by: Kotagiri Venkateswara Rao
- Music by: Chakravarthy
- Production company: Annapurna Studios
- Release date: 27 June 1981
- Running time: 148 mins
- Country: India
- Language: Telugu

Prema Kanuka (transl. Gift of Love) is a 1981 Indian Telugu-language drama film, produced by Venkat Akkineni, Nagarjuna Akkineni under Annapurna Studios banner and directed by K. Raghavendra Rao. It stars Akkineni Nageswara Rao, Sridevi with music composed by Chakravarthy.

== Cast ==
- Akkineni Nageswara Rao as Raja Shekaram
- Sridevi as Sandhya
- Rao Gopal Rao as Janthuvula Jaganatham
- Satyanarayana as Bhushaiah
- Allu Ramalingaiah as All in all Anjaneyulu
- Mohan Babu as Mohan
- Prabhakar Reddy as Veeraiah
- Music Director Chakravarthy as Appa Rao
- Chalapathi Rao as Kumar
- Narra Venkateswara Rao as Jaggu
- Madhumalini as Gowri
- Manorama as Aandallu
- Subhashini as Rani
- Pushpalatha as Seeta
- Master Harish as Young Raja Shekaram

== Crew ==
- Art: G. V. Subba Rao
- Choreography: Saleem
- Fights: Raghavulu
- Dialogues: Satyanand
- Lyrics: Acharya Atreya
- Playback: S. P. Balasubrahmanyam, P. Susheela, S. P. Sailaja
- Music: Chakravarthy
- Story: Guhanathan
- Editing: Kotagiri Venkateswara Rao
- Cinematography: K. S. Prakash
- Producer: Venkat Akkineni, Nagarjuna Akkineni
- Screenplay - Director: K. Raghavendra Rao
- Banner: Annapurna Studios
- Release Date: 27 June 1981

== Soundtrack ==
Prema Kanuka

Film score by Chakravarthy
- Released: 1981
- Genre: Soundtrack
- Length: 25:17
- Producer: Chakravarthy

Chakravarthy chronology
| Premabhishekam (1981) | Prema Kanuka (1981) | Prema Simhasanam (1981) |

Music composed by Chakravarthy. Lyrics were written by Acharya Atreya.

| S.No | Song title | Singers | length |
|---|---|---|---|
| 1 | "Ayyaare Thuntarodu" | S. P. Balasubrahmanyam, P. Susheela | 3:45 |
| 2 | "Chemmaa Chekkaa" | S. P. Balasubrahmanyam, P. Susheela | 3:43 |
| 3 | "Manasula Mudi" | S. P. Balasubrahmanyam, P. Susheela | 4:23 |
| 4 | "Ee Konda Konallo" | S. P. Balasubrahmanyam, P. Susheela | 4:33 |
| 5 | "Janthar Manthar" | S. P. Balasubrahmanyam, P. Susheela | 4:22 |
| 6 | "Vanta Chesi Choopisthaa" | S. P. Balasubrahmanyam, S. P. Sailaja | 4:25 |
| 7 | "O Navamadana Raaraa" | S. P. Balasubrahmanyam, P. Susheela | 7:09 |

== Others ==
- VCDs and DVDs on - VOLGA Videos, Hyderabad
