= Bhale Krishnudu =

- Theatrical release poster
- Directed by: Kovelamudi Raghavendra Rao
- Written by: Jandhyala
- Story by: Jandhyala
- Produced by: K. KrishnaMohan Rao
- Starring: Krishna; Jaya Prada; Jaggayya; Sangeeta; Nagabhushanam; Allu Rama Lingaiah; Mohan Babu; Kaikala Satyanarayana
- Cinematography: K. S. Prakash
- Edited by: Kotagiri Venkateswara Rao
- Music by: K. Chakravarthy
- Release date: 14 January 1980
- Running time: 147 mins
- Country: India
- Language: Telugu

Bhale Krishnudu is a comedy-drama Telugu film starring Krishna. Krishna is the son of millionaire Madhav Rao. Madhav Rao's partners cheat him, which leads to his death. Krishna then has to take care of his family as well as avenge his father's death.

== Plot ==
Krishna is a son of rich person, played by Jaggayya, and Anjali Devi is his mother. Krishna is a happy-go-lucky guy who enjoys himself with his friends by giving them money for their needs and loves Sangeeta. He accidentally meets Jaya Prada, a village girl and teases her. One day Nagabhushanam, the secretary of Jaggayya tricks him and makes him sign his property papers to his name and it leads to the death of Jaggayya. Krishna's family was dragged to the road by Nagabhushanam and his allies Mohan Babu and Allu Ramalingaiah. Krishna's friends shows him empty hands when he asks their help and Sangeeta leaves him when he loses his property. Krishna starts doing daily labour to run his family with the help of Jaya Prada, who shows him the job and there he meets Satyanarayana, who tells Krishna the truth behind his families present situation and asks him to punish Nagabushanam for his actions. The rest of the story is how Krishna and Jaya Prada, with the help of Satyanarayana defeat Nagabhshanam and get back their property by falsifying their identity.

== Cast ==
- Anjali Devi as Lakshmi
- Krishna as Krishna
- Jaggayya as Madhava Rao
- Kaikala Satyanarayana as Narayana
- Jaya Prada as Ratti
- Sangeeta as Radha
- Allu Ramalingaiah as Gurunatham
- Mohan Babu
- Nagabhushanam as Karunakaram
- Sakshi Ranga Rao as Gopal Rao
- K. V. Chalam as Venu
- Halam
- Chalapathi Rao as Madhu
- Lakshmikanth as Praveen
- Mukkamala as Mesthri Yadaiah
- Kalpana Rai as Manga

== Soundtrack ==
All the songs were written by Aatreya and Veturi. All the songs were sung by P. Susheela and S. P. Balasubrahmanyam.

- "Ponna Chettu Needalo"
- "Brundavanamoka"
- "Evaru Nuvvu"
- "Muddante Vaddanake"
- "Mogali Motaga Dolu Sannayi"
- "Itikimeeda Itikeste"
