= K. Raghavendra Rao =

Indian film director (born 1942)

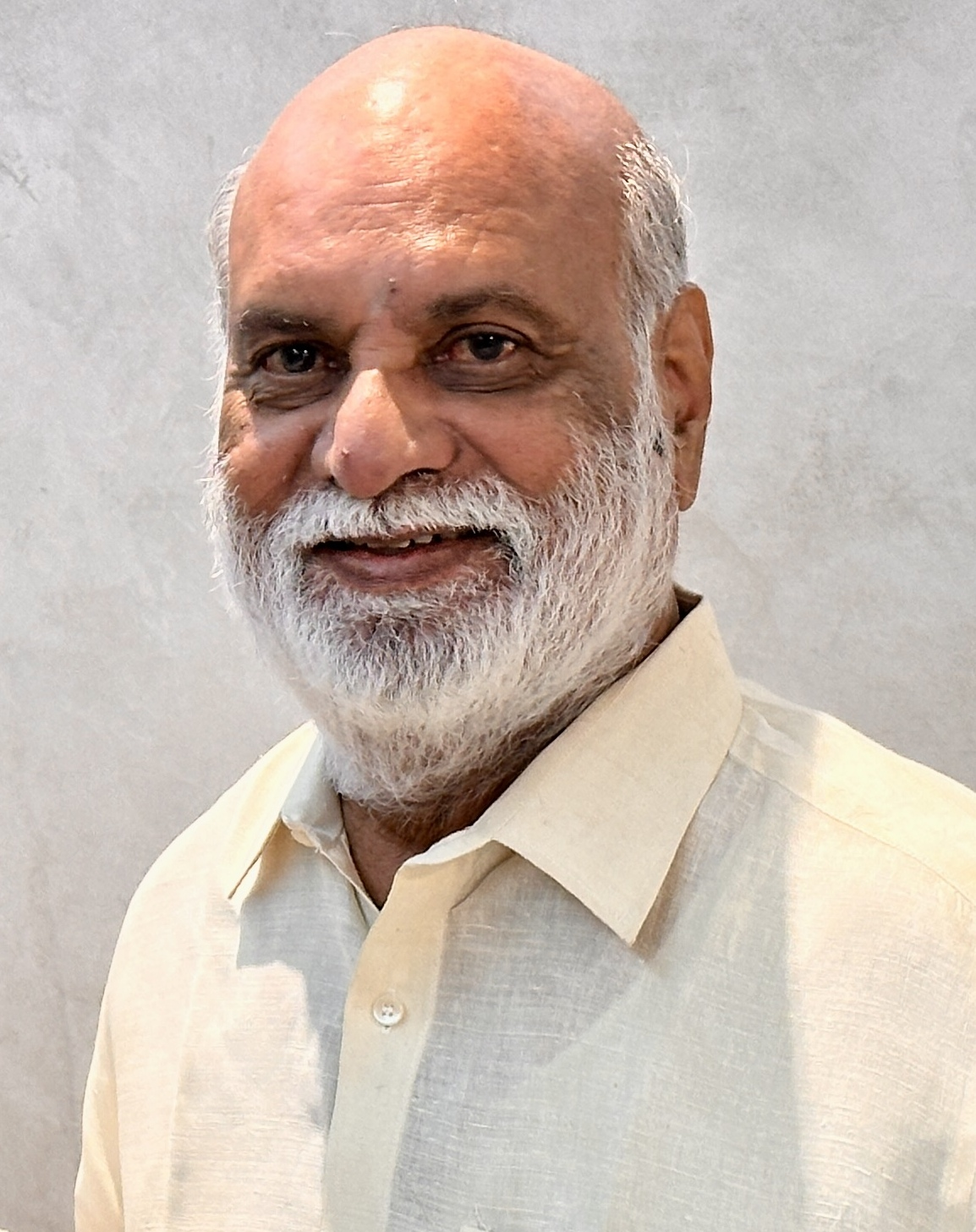
- K. Raghavendra Rao at an interview in 2018
- Born: Kovelamudi Raghavendra Rao; 23 May 1942 (age 84); Kolavennu, Madras Presidency, British India (now Andhra Pradesh, India)
- Occupations: Film director; screenwriter; choreographer; producer
- Years active: Since 1977
- Spouse: Sarala
- Children: 2, including Prakash Kovelamudi
- Parent(s): K. S. Prakash Rao (father); G. Varalakshmi (step-mother)
- Relatives: K. Bapayya (cousin); Shobu Yarlagadda (son-in-law)

Kovelamudi Raghavendra Rao (born 23 May 1942) is an Indian film director, screenwriter, choreographer, and producer known primarily for his work in Telugu cinema, besides a few Hindi film and Kannada films. Over a career spanning more than four decades, he has directed over a hundred films across various genres, including romantic dramas, romantic comedies, fantasies, melodramas, action thrillers, and biographical dramas. He has received numerous accolades, including the National Film Award, ten state Nandi Awards and five Filmfare Awards South.

Raghavendra Rao received the state Nandi Award for Best Director for his works such as Bobbili Brahmanna (1984), and Pelli Sandadi (1996). He received the Filmfare Award for Best Director – Telugu for the drama film Prema Lekhalu (1977), the fantasy film Jagadeka Veerudu Athiloka Sundari (1990), and the romance film Allari Priyudu (1993). Raghavendra Rao is known for his works in hagiographical films such as Annamayya (1997), which won two National Film Awards, and was featured at the 29th IFFI in the mainstream section. Raghavendra Rao also received the Nandi Award for Best Direction, the Filmfare Award for Best Direction for his work in the film. His other hagiographic works such as Sri Manjunatha (2001), Sri Ramadasu (2006), Shirdi Sai (2012) and Om Namo Venkatesaya (2017), received several state honours.

His mainstream works such as the 1987 social problem film Agni Putrudu, and the 1988 romantic action Aakhari Poratam, were featured at the 11th and 12th IFFI respectively in the mainstream section. In 1992, he directed the melodrama Gharana Mogudu featured at the 24th IFFI in the mainstream section. It became the first Telugu film to gross over ₹10 crore (US$1.0 million) at the box office. Next, he directed the instant hit Allari Priyudu (1993), featured at the 25th IFFI in the mainstream section. In 2004 he produced Bommalata which fetched the National Film Award for Best Feature Film in Telugu at the 53rd National Film Awards.

== Personal life ==
Raghavendra Rao was born on 23 May 1942 to veteran director K. S. Prakash Rao and Koteswaramma. He is also the father of actor turned filmmaker Prakash Kovelamudi. Raghavendra Rao was an executive member in the Tirumala Tirupati Devasthanams Board from 2015 to 2019.

== Awards and honors ==
National Film Awards

- Best Feature Film in Telugu - Bommalata (2006)

Nandi Awards

- NTR National Award - 2015
- B. N. Reddy National Award for lifetime contribution to Telugu cinema (2009)
- Best Director – Annamayya (1997)
- Best Choreographer – Pelli Sandadi (1996)
- Best Director – Pelli Sandadi (1996)
- Best Director – Allari Priyudu (1993)
- Best Director – Bobbili Brahmanna (1984)

Filmfare Awards South

- Best Director – Prema Lekhalu (1977)
- Best Director – Jagadeka Veerudu Athiloka Sundari (1990)
- Best Director – Allari Priyudu (1993)
- Best Director – Annamayya (1997)
- Lifetime Achievement Award (2002)

IIFA Awards

- Outstanding contribution to Indian cinema (2017)

SIIMA Awards

- Lifetime Achievement Award (2014)

CineMAA Awards

- Lifetime Contribution Award – (2012)
- Best Film (Jury) – Shirdi Sai – (2013)

Other Awards

- Allu Rama Lingaiah Award (2016)

== Filmography ==
Key
†	Denotes films that have not yet been released

=== Director ===
Year	Title	Language	Notes
1975	Babu	Telugu	
1976	Jyothi	Telugu	
1976	Raja	Telugu	
1977	Aame Katha	Telugu	
1977	Amara Deepam	Telugu	Remake of Tamil film Dheepam (1977)
1977	Prema Lekhalu	Telugu	
1977	Kalpana	Telugu	Remake of Hindi film Anamika
1977	Adavi Ramudu	Telugu	
1978	Padaharella Vayasu	Telugu	Remake of Bharathiraja's 16 Vayathinile (Tamil)
1978	Simha Baludu	Telugu	
1978	Radha Krishna	Telugu	
1978	KD No:1	Telugu	
1979	Driver Ramudu	Telugu	
1979	Nindu Noorellu	Telugu	
1979	Vetagaadu	Telugu	
1980	Nippulaanti Nijam	Telugu	
1980	Nishana	Hindi	
1980	Bhale Krishnudu	Telugu	
1980	Gharana Donga	Telugu	
1980	Mosagadu	Telugu	
1980	Rowdy Ramudu Konte Krishnudu	Telugu	
1981	Satyabhama	Telugu	Remake of Tamil film Mouna Geethangal
1981	Ragile Jwala	Telugu	
1981	Gaja Donga	Telugu	
1981	Ooriki Monagadu	Telugu	
1981	Tirugu Leni Manishi	Telugu	
1981	Satyam Shivam	Telugu	
1981	Prema Kanuka	Telugu	
1981	Kondaveeti Simham	Telugu	
1982	Madhura Swapnam	Telugu	
1982	Trishulam	Telugu	
1982	Justice Chowdary	Telugu	
1982	Iddaru Kodukulu	Telugu	
1982	Farz Aur Kaanoon	Hindi	
1982	Devata	Telugu	
1983	Himmatwala	Hindi	
1983	Adavi Simhalu	Telugu	
1983	Jaani Dost	Hindi	
1983	Justice Chaudhury	Hindi	
1983	Shakthi	Telugu	
1984	Tohfa	Hindi	
1984	Bobbili Brahmanna	Telugu	
1984	Kaamyab	Hindi	
1984	Naya Kadam	Hindi	
1984	Iddaru Dongalu	Telugu	
1985	Hoshiyar	Hindi	
1985	Pattabhishekam	Telugu	
1985	Adavi Donga	Telugu	
1985	Masterji	Hindi	Remake of Tamil film Mundhanai Mudichu
1985	Mera Saathi	Hindi	
1985	Agni Parvatam	Telugu	
1985	Vajrayudham	Telugu	
1986	Apoorva Sahodarulu	Telugu	
1986	Kaliyuga Pandavulu	Telugu	
1986	Dharm Adhikari	Hindi	
1986	Ravana Brahma	Telugu	
1986	Kondaveeti Raja	Telugu	
1986	Suhaagan	Hindi	
1986	Chanakya Shapadham	Telugu	
1987	Bharatamlo Arjunudu	Telugu	
1987	Sahasa Samrat	Telugu	
1987	Agni Putrudu	Telugu	
1988	Janaki Ramudu	Telugu	
1988	Donga Ramudu	Telugu	
1988	Manchi Donga	Telugu	
1988	Aakhari Poratam	Telugu	
1988	Yuddha Bhoomi	Telugu	
1989	Agni	Telugu	
1989	Rudranetra	Telugu	
1989	Ontari Poratam	Telugu	
1990	Alludugaru	Telugu	
1990	Jagadeka Veerudu Athiloka Sundari	Telugu	
1991	Coolie No.1	Telugu	
1991	Rowdy Alludu	Telugu	
1992	Sundarakanda	Telugu	
1992	Allari Mogudu	Telugu	
1992	Gharana Mogudu	Telugu	remake of the Kannada film Anuraga Aralithu
1992	Aswamedham	Telugu	
1993	Allari Priyudu	Telugu	
1993	Major Chandrakanth	Telugu	
1994	Allari Premikudu	Telugu	
1994	Muddula Priyudu	Telugu	
1994	Mugguru Monagallu	Telugu	
1995	Raja Simham	Telugu	
1995	Gharana Bullodu	Telugu	
1996	Sahasa Veerudu Sagara Kanya	Telugu	
1996	Bombay Priyudu	Telugu	
1996	Pelli Sandadi	Telugu	
1997	Annamayya	Telugu	
1997	Mere Sapno Ki Rani	Hindi	
1998	Shrimati Vellosta	Telugu	
1998	Love Story 1999	Telugu	
1998	Paradesi	Telugu	
1999	Iddaru Mitrulu	Telugu	
1999	Raja Kumarudu	Telugu	
2000	Pelli Sambandham	Telugu	
2000	Moodu Mukkalaata	Telugu	
2001	Sri Manjunatha	Kannada	Partially reshot in Telugu
2001	Aamdani Atthani Kharcha Rupaiyaa	Hindi	Remake of the Tamil film Viralukketha Veekkam
2003	Gangotri	Telugu	100th film
2005	Subash Chandra Bose	Telugu	
2005	Allari Bullodu	Telugu	
2006	Sri Ramadasu	Telugu	
2008	Pandurangadu	Telugu	
2010	Jhummandi Naadam	Telugu	
2012	Shirdi Sai	Telugu	
2017	Om Namo Venkatesaya	Telugu	

=== Actor ===
Year	Title	Role	Notes
2021	Pelli SandaD	Vasishta	Sequel of Pelli Sandadi

=== Supervisor of direction ===
Year	Title	Notes
2001	Student No.1	Directorial debut of S. S. Rajamouli
2002	Okato Number Kurraadu	Director A. Kodandarami Reddy
2004	Pallakilo Pellikoothuru	Director Suchitra Chandrabose
2021	Pelli SandaD	Director Gowri Ronanki

=== Associate director ===
Year	Title	Notes
1961	Vagdanam	Director Acharya Aatreya

=== Producer ===
Year	Title	Notes
1980	Bhale Krishnudu	
1984	Naya Kadam	Hindi film; remake of Trishulam
1993	Allari Priyudu	
1999	Iddaru Mitrulu	
2000	Pelli Sambandham	
2002	Okato Number Kurradu	
2004	Morning Raga	English film
2004	Bommalata	Won Best Film in Telugu at the 53rd National Awards

=== Presenter ===
Year	Title	Notes
2001	Student No. 1	
2002	Bobby	
2011	Anaganaga O Dheerudu	
2015	Baahubali: The Beginning	
2017	Baahubali: The Conclusion	

=== Choreographer ===
Year	Title	Notes
1996	Pelli Sandadi	

=== Television ===
- 2002: Santhi Nivasam (ETV)
- 2010: Arundathi (ETV Kannada)
- 2013: Mangammagari Manavaralu (Zee telugu)
- 2014: Soundrya Lahari (ETV)
- 2016: Koyilamma (MAA TV)
- 2017: Sye Sye Sayyare (ETV)
- 2017: Agnisakshi (Star MAA)
- 2018: Siri Siri Muvvalu (Star MAA)
- 2020: C/o Anasuya (Star MAA)
- 2021: Krishna Tulasi (Zee telugu)
