= Mohan Babu =

Indian actor

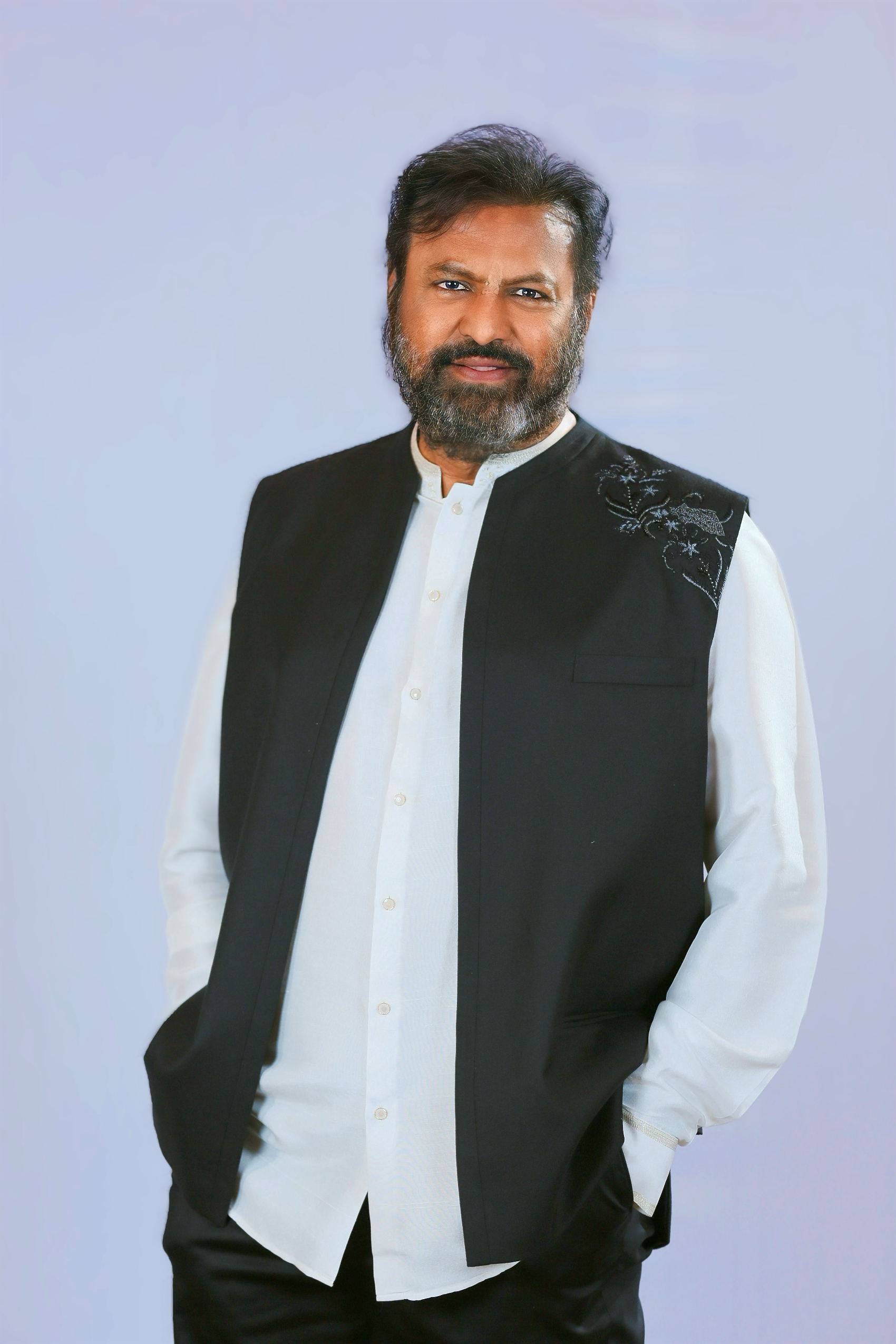
- Mohan Babu in 2024
- Born: Manchu Bhakthavatsalam Naidu; 19 March 1952 (age 74); Modhugulapalem, Tirupati, Madras State, India (now Andhra Pradesh, India)
- Education: M.G.R. Government Film and Television Training Institute; YMCA College of Physical Education
- Occupations: Actor; Film producer; Educationist; Businessman
- Political party: YSR Congress Party
- Other political affiliations: Telugu Desam Party
- Spouses: Vidya Devi (died): Nirmala Devi
- Children: Lakshmi; Vishnu; Manoj

Member of Parliament, Rajya Sabha
- In office 18 April 1995 – 2 April 2000
- Preceded by: Majji Tulasi Das
- Succeeded by: Vanga Geetha
- Constituency: Andhra Pradesh

Manchu Bhakthavatsalam Naidu, credited and also known as Mohan Babu, is an Indian actor and film producer known for his works predominantly in Telugu cinema. An alumnus of the M.G.R. Government Film and Television Training Institute, Mohan Babu has acted in more than 500 films in lead, supporting and other roles.

In 1995, he received Filmfare Award for Best Actor – Telugu for his work in the multi-starrer Pedarayudu, which also starred Rajinikanth in a pivotal role. In 2007, he received the CineMAA Award for Best Supporting Actor for his work in Yamadonga. Mohan Babu received an honorary doctorate from the University of California, Berkeley for his contribution to the field of cinema and education. He is the co-owner of production companies such as Sree Lakshmi Prasanna Pictures, 24 Frames Factory and Manchu Entertainment. In 2017, he garnered the Filmfare Lifetime Achievement Award – South. In 2017, he received the "Special Appreciation Award" for completing "forty years in cinema" at the 6th South Indian International Movie Awards.

A former physical education instructor, Mohan Babu is an educator and operates Sree Vidyanikethan Educational Institutions. He is the founder of Sree Vidyanikethan Educational Trust. In January 2022, Mohan Babu announced the Mohan Babu University would be named after himself in Tirupati at Sree Vidyanikethan Sree Sainath Nagar, formerly known as Sree Vidyanikethan Educational Institutions and he is the chancellor of the university. In 2007, he was awarded the Padma Shri for his contribution to film art.

== Early life ==
Mohan Babu was born to Manchu Narayanaswamy Naidu and Manchu Lakshmamma in the Modhugulapalem village near Tirupati.

== Career ==
Mohan Babu began his career as a Physical education instructor at the YMCA college of physical education for many years.

During this time, Mohan Babu was introduced to Dasari Narayana Rao who was then a script writer in Telugu cinema. This would pan out to become the most significant event of his career. Mohan Babu's first major breakthrough as an actor came with the 1975 film Swargam Narakam, directed by Dasari Narayana Rao. Dasari cast him as a villain in the movie and went on to achieve great success. It was after this movie that his birth name Bakthavatsalam Naidu was changed to Mohan Babu. After appearing in many films as a comedy-villain, he proceeded to star as the leading actor in Khaidi Kalidasu, Ketugadu, Gruha Pravesam, Assembly Rowdy, Allari Mogudu and many more. He appeared in a few Tamil films starring Sivaji Ganesan.

In 1978, he appeared in Sivaranjani. The movie heralded the 'villain' and also came out with many of the mannerisms. He had an outstanding mentor in the form of Dasari Narayana Rao, who guided him in the right direction and gave him the initial foundation substratum he required to do well. Mohan Babu followed this success by portraying a variety of roles in his next films such as Simha Garjana (1978), Simha Baludu (1978), Rama Krishnulu (1978), Padaharella Vayasu (1978), Nayudu Bava (1978), Shokilla Rayudu (1979) and Ravanude Ramudayithe? (1979). His roles in Patnam Vachina Pativrathalu (1982), Billa Ranga (1978), Dharma Poratam (1983), Padmavyooham (1984), Bhale Ramudu (1984) and Sanchalanam (1985), showed a diverse range, despite often playing the villain.

In October 2020, his film Son of India directed by Diamond Ratnababu was launched and was produced by Vishnu Manchu. Mohan Babu has penned screenplay for the film. The film was released in 2022.

In Dec 2025, Mohan Babu marked his 50th year in the film industry by hosting a celebration titled MB50, which was attended by prominent figures from the cinema and political spheres.

== Producer ==
As an ardent admirer of N.T. Rama Rao, in 1993, Mohan Babu produced Major Chandrakanth, starring N.T. Rama Rao and himself . The movie was directed by K. Raghavendra Rao, and went on to become a major blockbuster. The movie also celebrated its silver jubilee and stands as the last movie in N.T. Rama Rao's film career.

In his career spanning over 48 years, Mohan Babu has produced around 40 movies, with most of them turning out to be successful. He produced Kannappa movie, which bombed at the box office.

== Contributions to education ==
Mohan Babu established the Sree Vidyanikethan Educational Trust in 1993. Today, Sree Vidyanikethan runs the Sree Vidyanikethan International School, Sree Vidyanikethan Degree College, Sree Vidyanikethan Engineering College, Sree Vidyanikethan College of Pharmacy, Sree Vidyanikethan College of Nursing and Sree Vidyanikethan Institute of Management.

Mohan Babu established university in Tirupati named after him Mohan Babu University in January 2022, encompasses the educational institutions hitherto managed by the actor under the Sree Vidyanikethan Educational Trust(SVET) which he had established in 1993, and he is the founder and chancellor of the university.

== Personal life ==
Mohan Babu was married to Vidya Devi, with whom he has a daughter, Manchu Lakshmi Prasanna, and a son, Manchu Vishnu, who are both actors in the film industry. After her death, he married her younger sister, Nirmala Devi, with whom he has a son Manchu Manoj, also an actor.

== Awards and nominations ==
- In 2007, he was awarded Padma Shri for his contribution to Film art.
  - Filmfare Lifetime Achievement Award – South (2016).
  - Filmfare Best Actor Award (Telugu) – Peddarayudu (1995)
  - National geographic award (2017)
  - CineMAA Award for Best Supporting Actor – Yamadonga (2008)
- Honorary doctorate at the 26th convocation of the Dr. MGR University. in Chennai, Tamil Nadu on 5 October 2017.
- TSR Kalaparishath honoured him with the title Natavachaspathi for his valuable contribution to the Telugu cinema.
- The Glory of India International Award.
- 'Viswa Nata Sarvabhouma' title at Shilpakala Vedika in Hyderabad by Former Union Minister and filmmaker T. Subbarami Reddy.

=== Dialogue Book ===
As he completed 50 years in the film industry, the actor's popular dialogues were compiled in a book, named "Dialogue King".
