= Sridevi filmography =

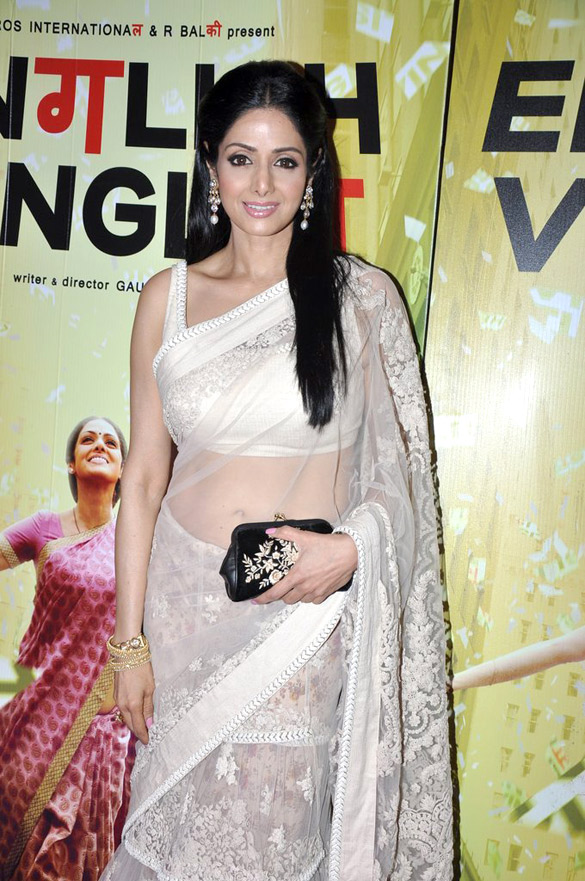
Sridevi at the premiere of her film English Vinglish in 2012

Indian actress Sridevi (1963–2018) debuted as a child in the 1967 Tamil film Kandhan Karunai at the age of four, and began playing lead roles as a child in M. A. Thirumugam’s 1969 mythological Tamil film Thunaivan. Her first role as an on-screen adult came in 1976 at the age of 13, in the Tamil film Moondru Mudichu. She then starred in 16 Vayathinile (1977) which proved to be a major breakthrough for Sridevi. Following this, she appeared in the critically acclaimed thriller Sigappu Rojakkal (1978) and the satirical drama Varumayin Niram Sivappu (1980), establishing herself as a leading female star in South Indian Cinema. Subsequently, she played a woman who suffers from Amnesia in the critically and commercially successful classic Moondram Pirai (1982). She also achieved success by starring as a female lead in the successful dramas Padaharella Vayasu (1978), Meendum Kokila (1981), Premabhishekam (1981), Vazhvey Maayam (1982) and Aakhari Poratam (1988).

In 1972, Sridevi debuted as a child artist in Hindi cinema with Rani Mera Naam, she also appeared in the film Julie (1975). Sridevi's first major role came with the drama film Solva Sawan (1979), and she emerged with wider recognition in the action film Himmatwala (1983). She established herself as a major star in top-grossing hits in Mawaali (1983), Justice Chaudhury (1983), Tohfa (1984), Maqsad (1984), Masterji (1985), Karma (1986), Janbaaz (1986) and Waqt Ki Awaz (1988). In 1986, she appeared in the snake fantasy Nagina which saw Sridevi play a shape-shifting woman. The film turned out to be the second highest-grossing film of the year. Nagina is credited as being the film which established Sridevi's position as the biggest and highest-paid female star of the 1980s. Sridevi followed this by playing a goofy crime journalist in the science fiction film Mr. India (1987), which emerged as a major critical and commercial success. She subsequently reinforced her position as the top female star of the era with Yash Chopra's musical romance Chandni (1989), as a woman at the center of a love triangle, and the slapstick comedy ChaalBaaz (1989), in which she portrayed twins. She achieved further success in the Telugu films Jagadeka Veerudu Athiloka Sundari (1990) and Kshana Kshanam (1991). The former of which was the highest grossing Telugu film to that point.

She appeared in another Yash Chopra directorial with the musical romance Lamhe (1991), in a dual role, she plays both mother and daughter. She appeared in a double role opposite Amitabh Bachchan in the epic drama Khuda Gawah (1992), which was one of the highest grossing films of the year. Sridevi's big-budget 1993 release Roop Ki Rani Choron Ka Raja was one of India's most expensive films ever made. Though the film failed at the box office. She next starred in the 1993 thriller Gumrah as a singer falsely accused of drugs smuggling in Hong Kong. In 1994, Sridevi starred in Laadla playing the villainous business tycoon Sheetal Jaitley. The last major film Sridevi starred in before she took a break from the industry was the romantic drama Judaai, released in 1997, in which the actress played a greedy housewife going to extreme lengths for money. After a 6-year hiatus, Sridevi briefly returned to the small screen in the Sahara sitcom Malini Iyer (2004–2005). After an 15-year absence from film, Sridevi starred in English Vinglish (2012), a comedy-drama. In the film, she played Shashi Godbole, a housewife who enrolls in an English-speaking course after her husband and daughter's mocking of her English skills. With the high critical acclaim and massive commercial success of English Vinglish, Sridevi became the only actress in Bollywood to make a successful comeback as a leading lady after marriage and a long hiatus. Sridevi was next seen in her home production titled Mom (2017), which marked her 300th film. In the psychological thriller film, she played a mother who sets out to avenge the rape of her daughter. Her last on-screen appearance was in the film Zero (2018) in a cameo. Throughout her career from 1967-2018 Sridevi has acted in over 300 films. which is 103 Telugu films, 84 Tamil films, 84 Hindi films, 24 Malayalam films, 5 Kannada films and 1 Television serial In Hindi.

== Telugu ==
Year	Title	Role(s)	Notes	Ref(s)
1970	Maa Nana Nirdoshi		Child artist	
1970	Agni Pareeksha		Child artist	
1970	Rowdy Rani		Child artist	
1970	Vidhi Vilasam	Jyoti	Child artist	
1971	Nenoo Manishine		Child artist	
1971	Srimanthudu		Child artist	
1971	Kathiki Kankanam		Child artist	
1971	Athalu Kodallu	Young Vanisri	Child artist	
1971	Pattindalla Bangaram	Young Bharathi	Child artist	
1971	Naa Tammudu		Child artist	
1972	Badi Panthulu		Child artist	
1972	Amma Maata		Child artist	
1972	Bala Bharatam	Dussala	Child artist	
1972	Bharya Biddalu		Child artist	
1973	Bhakta Tukaram	Kaasi	Child artist	
1973	Marapurani Manishi	Young Ammulu	Child artist	
1973	Mallamma Katha		Child artist	
1973	Meena	Young Meena	Child artist	
1975	Yashoda Krishna	Krishna	Child artist	
1975	Anuragalu	Jyoti		
1975	Devudulaanti Manishi			
1976	Ee Kalapu Pillalu			
1977	Bangarakka	Bangarakka		
1978	Padaharella Vayasu	Malli	Nominated - Filmfare Award for Best Actress - Telugu	
1979	Bangaru Chellelu	Lakshmi		
1979	Burripalem Bullodu	Jyoti		
1979	Karthika Deepam	Radha	Nominated - Filmfare Award for Best Actress - Telugu	
1979	Muddula Koduku	Radha		
1979	Vetagaadu	Roja		
1979	Samajaniki Saval			
1980	Adrushtavanthudu	Saroja		
1980	Aatagadu	Vijaya		
1980	Chuttalunnaru Jagratha	Vanaja		
1980	Kaksha	Radha		
1980	Devudu Ichchina Koduku	Rajamma		
1980	Gharana Donga	Devi		
1980	Mama Allulla Saval	Lalita		
1980	Prema Kanuka	Sandhya		
1980	Rowdy Ramudu Konte Krishnudu	Mutyam		
1980	Sardar Papa Rayudu	Vijaya		
1980	Gaja Donga	Sujata		
1980	Mosagadu	Seetha and Geetha		
1980	Ram Robert Rahim			
1981	Puli Bidda	Mala		
1981	Bhoga Bhagyalu	Radha		
1981	Aakali Rajyam	Devi		
1981	Gharana Gangulu			
1981	Gadasari Atta Sogasari Kodalu	Susheela		
1981	Guru Sishyulu	Lata		
1981	Kondaveeti Simham	Devi		
1981	Premabhishekam	Devi	Nominated - Filmfare Award for Best Actress - Telugu	
1981	Rani Kasula Rangamma	Rangamma		
1981	Illalu	Jyoti		
1981	Satyam Shivam	Parvati		
1981	Aggi Ravva	Vani		
1982	Aadi Vishnulu			
1982	Trisulam	Lakshmi		
1982	Andagaadu	Hema		
1982	Anuraga Devata	Roopa Devi		
1982	Bangaaru Bhoomi	Padma		
1982	Bangaaru Koduku			
1982	Bobbili Puli	Vijaya		
1982	Justice Chowdary	Rekha		
1982	Kalavari Samsaram	Sujatha		
1982	Krisharjunulu	Vasanti		
1982	Krishnavataram	Gauri		
1982	Bangaru Kanuka	Roopa		
1982	Vayyari Bhamalu Vagalamari Bhartalu	Indumathi		
1982	Prema Nakshatram			
1982	Devata	Lalita		
1982	Shamsher Shankar	Sujatha		
1983	Adavi Simhalu	Rekha		
1983	Kirayi Kotigadu	Gauri		
1983	Mundadugu	Bharati		
1983	Ramarajyamlo Bheemaraju	Jyoti		
1983	Sri Ranga Neethulu	Vijaya		
1983	Oorantha Sankranthi	Satya		
1983	Muddula Mogudu	Durga		
1984	Babulugaadi Debba	Radha		
1984	S.P. Bhayankar	Devi		
1984	Kanchu Kagada	Durga		
1984	Kode Trachu	Lalita		
1985	Vajrayudham	Subhadra		
1985	Pachani Kapuram	Priya		
1986	Oka Radha Iddaru Krishnulu	Radha		
1986	Jayam Manade	Kanaka Maha Lakshmi		
1986	Khaidi Rudraiah	Lata		
1987	Makutamleni Maharaju	Saroja		
1987	Maa Voori Magadu	Rajani		
1988	Maharajashri Mayagaadu	Divya		
1988	Aakhari Poratam	Pravallika	Nominated - Filmfare Award for Best Actress - Telugu	
1990	Jagadeka Veerudu Atiloka Sundari	Indraja / Rani	Nominated - Filmfare Award for Best Actress - Telugu	
1991	Kshana Kshanam	Satya	Filmfare Award for Best Actress - Telugu; Nandi Award for Best Actress	
1994	Govinda Govinda	Naveena		
1994	S. P. Parasuram	Rani		

== Tamil ==
Tamil films acted by Sridevi
Year	Title	Role(s)	Notes	Ref(s)
1967	Kandhan Karunai	Lord Murugan	Child artist	
1969	Thunaivan	Lord Murugan	Child artist	
1969	Kulavilakku		Child artist	
1969	Nam Naadu	Raja	Child artist	
1970	Penn Deivam		Child artist	
1970	En Annan	Child Thangam	Child artist	
1971	Babu	Young Ammu	Child artist	
1971	Aathi Parasakthi	Lord Murugan	Child artist	
1971	Sabatham	Lord Krishna	Child artist	
1971	Yaanai Valartha Vanambadi Magan		Child artist	
1972	Agathiyar	Lord Murugan	Child artist	
1972	Sange Muzhangu	Sivagami	Child artist	
1972	Kanimuthu Paappa		Child artist	
1972	Vasantha Maligai	Vijay's daughter	Child artist	
1973	Nanban		Child artist	
1973	Malai Nattu Mangai		Child artist	
1973	Deiva Kuzhandhaigal		Child artist	
1973	Prarthanai		Child artist	
1973	Bharatha Viilas		Child artist	
1974	Thirumangalyam	Shanthi	Child artist	
1974	Thirudi		Child artist	
1974	Engal Kuladheivam	young valli	Child artist	
1974	Avalukku Nikar Avale	young Meena	Child artist	
1975	Dasavatharam	Princess Seetha Devi	Child artist	
1976	Moondru Mudichu	Selvi	Filmfare Special Award – South; Nominated - Filmfare Award for Best Actress - Tamil	
1977	Gayathri	Gayathri		
1977	Kavikkuyil	Radha		
1977	16 Vayathinile	Mayil	Nominated - Filmfare Award for Best Actress - Tamil	
1977	Sayndhadamma Sayndhadu	Gauri		
1977	Unnai Suttrum Ulagam	Young Seetha		
1978	Ilaya Rani Rajalakshmi			
1978	Ganga Yamuna Kaveri			
1978	Taxi Driver			
1978	Rajavuketha Rani			
1978	Vanakkatukuriya Kathaliye	Shanti and Jenny		
1978	Idhu Eppadi Irukku	Menaka		
1978	Machanai Partheengala			
1978	Manidharil Ithanai Nirangala	Santha		
1978	Mudisooda Mannan	Rupa		
1978	Pilot Premnath	Premnath's blind daughter		
1978	Sigappu Rojakkal	Sarada	Nominated - Filmfare Award for Best Actress - Tamil	
1978	Priya	Priya		
1979	Arumbugal			
1979	Dharma Yuddham	Chitra		
1979	Kalyanaraman	Shenbagam		
1979	Pagalil Oru Iravu	Bindhu	Nominated - Filmfare Award for Best Actress - Tamil	
1979	Kavariman			
1979	Neela Malargal	Meena		
1979	Naan Oru Kai Parkiren			
1979	Pattakathi Bhairavan	Deepa		
1979	Sigappukkal Mookkuthi	Janaki		
1979	Lakshmi	Lakshmi		
1979	Thaayillamal Naan Illai	Bhuvana		
1980	Guru	Sujatha		
1980	Johnny	Archana		
1980	Varumayin Niram Sivappu	Devi	Nominated - Filmfare Award for Best Actress - Tamil	
1980	Vishwaroopam	Geetha		
1981	Bala Nagamma	Bala		
1981	Deiva Thirumanangal			
1981	Sankarlal	Hema		
1981	Meendum Kokila	Kokila	Filmfare Award for Best Actress - Tamil	
1981	Ranuva Veeran			
1982	Pokkiri Raja	Vanaja		
1982	Vazhvey Maayam	Devi		
1982	Moondram Pirai	Bhagyalaksmi / Vijaya / Viji	Tamil Nadu State Film award for Best Actress Nominated - Filmfare Award for Best Actress - Tamil	
1982	Thanikattu Raja	Vani		
1982	Deviyin Thirivilaiyadal			
1983	Santhippu	Geetha		
1983	Adutha Varisu	Valli / Radha		
1986	Naan Adimai Illai	Priya		
2015	Puli	Queen Yavanarani		

== Hindi ==
Year	Title	Role(s)	Notes	Ref.
1972	Rani Mera Naam	Rani	Child artist	
1975	Julie	Irene	Supporting role	
1979	Solva Sawan	Mehna		
1983	Himmatwala	Rekha		
1983	Sadma	Nehalata Malhotra	Nominated – Filmfare Award for Best Actress	
1983	Jaani Dost	Shaloo		
1983	Justice Chaudhury	Rekha		
1983	Mawaali	Julie		
1983	Kalakaar	Radha Khanna		
1984	Jaag Utha Insan	Sandhya		
1984	Akalmand	Priya		
1984	Inquilaab	Asha Nath		
1984	Tohfa	Lalita		
1984	Maqsad	Bharati		
1984	Naya Kadam	Laxmi		
1985	Sarfarosh	Vijaya		
1985	Balidaan	Uma		
1985	Masterji	Radha		
1986	Nagina	Rajni		
1986	Ghar Sansar	Radha		
1986	Aag Aur Shola	Aarti		
1986	Sultanat	Shehzadi Yasmeen		
1986	Dharm Adhikari	Priya		
1986	Bhagwaan Dada	Bijli		
1986	Aakhree Raasta	Vinita Bhatnagar		
1986	Janbaaz	Seema		
1986	Karma	Radha		
1986	Suhaagan	Janki		
1987	Watan Ke Rakhwale	Radha R. Pratap		
1987	Jawab Hum Denge	Jyoti		
1987	Aulad	Devki		
1987	Nazrana	Tulsi		
1987	Majaal	Sadhana		
1987	Mr. India	Seema Sahni		
1987	Himmat Aur Mehanat	Jyoti		
1988	Sone Pe Suhaaga	Meena		
1988	Sherni	Durga		
1988	Ram-Avtar	Sangeeta		
1988	Waqt Ki Awaz	Lata I. Prasad		
1988	Akarshan	Herself	Cameo	
1989	Nigahen: Nagina Part II	Neelam		
1989	Main Tera Dushman	Jugni		
1989	Guru	Uma/ Rama		
1989	Joshilaay	Phoolmati		
1989	Gair Kanooni	Laxmi		
1989	Chandni	Chandni Mathur	Nominated – Filmfare Award for Best Actress	
1989	ChaalBaaz	Anju/Manju	Filmfare Award for Best Actress	
1990	Pathar Ke Insan	Lata Rai		
1990	Naaka Bandi	Geeta/Seeta		
1991	Farishtay	Rasbhari		
1991	Lamhe	Pooja/Pallavi	Filmfare Award for Best Actress	
1991	Banjaran	Reshma/Devi		
1992	Khuda Gawah	Benazir/Mehndi	Nominated – Filmfare Award for Best Actress	
1992	Heer Ranjha	Heer		
1992	Aasmaan Se Gira	Forest Goddess	Special appearance	
1993	Gurudev	Sunita/Priya		
1993	Roop Ki Rani Choron Ka Raja	Seema Soni		
1993	Gumrah	Roshni Chadha	Nominated – Filmfare Award for Best Actress	
1993	Chandra Mukhi	Chandramukhi		
1994	Laadla	Sheetal Jaitley	Nominated – Filmfare Award for Best Actress	
1994	Chaand Kaa Tukdaa	Radha		
1996	Army	Geeta		
1996	Mr. Bechara	Asha		
1997	Judaai	Kajal Verma	Nominated – Filmfare Award for Best Actress	
1997	Kaun Sachcha Kaun Jhootha	Sapna Mathur		
2004	Meri Biwi Ka Jawaab Nahin	Durga	Delayed release	
2008	Halla Bol	Herself	Cameo	
2012	English Vinglish	Shashi Godbole	Partially reshot in Tamil with same title Nominated – Filmfare Award for Best Actress	
2013	Bombay Talkies	Herself	Cameo	
2017	Mom	Devki Sabarwal	Final film in a leading role National Film Award for Best Actress; Zee Cine Critics Award for Best Actor - Female; Nominated–Filmfare Critics Award for Best Actress	
2018	Zero	Herself	Cameo; Posthumous release	

== Malayalam ==
Year	Title	Role(s)	Notes	Ref(s)
1969	Kumara Sambhavam	Subramanian	Child artist	
1970	Swapnangal	Rajamma	Child artist	
1970	Sabarimala Sree Dharmashastha		Child artist	
1971	Poompatta	Sarada	Child artist	
1971	Aana Valarthiya Vanampadiyude Makan		Child artist	
1976	Abhinandanam	Lalitha		
1976	Kuttavum Sikshayum			
1976	Aalinganam	Bindu		
1976	Thulavarsham	Ammini		
1977	Aasheervaadam			
1977	Aadhya Paadam			
1977	Aa Nimisham			
1977	Anthardaaham	Prameela		
1977	Akale Aakaasham			
1977	Amme Anupame			
1977	Nirakudam	Shanta		
1977	Oonjaal	Sumitra		
1977	Angeekaaram	Sathi and Viji	first double role	
1977	Satyavan Savithri	Savithri		
1977	Vezhambal			
1978	Naalumanippookkal			
1979	Bhaaryaye Aavashyamundu			
1996	Devaraagam	Lakshmi		

== Kannada ==
Year	Title	Role(s)	Notes	Ref.
1974	Bhakta Kumbara	Mukta Bai	Child artiste	
1975	Hennu Samsarada Kannu	Susheela		
1979	Priya	Priya		

== Television ==
Year	Series	Role	Language	Ref(s)
2004–2005	Malini Iyer	Malini Iyer	Hindi	

== Bibliography ==
- Nayak, Satyarth (2019). Sridevi: The Eternal Screen Goddess. Random House. ISBN 978-0-670-09267-3.
