= Midde Rama Rao =

Midde Rama Rao also spelt as Midde Ramarao is an Indian film producer for producing some of the blockbluster hits in the Telugu film industry such as Padahaarella Vayasu, Pandanti Jeevitam, Ramarajyamlo Bheemaraju, and Goonda.

He produced the films starring heroes Krishna, Sobhan Babu, Chiranjeevi, Nandamuri Balakrishna, Mohan Babu, Sridevi, Vijayashanti and Chandra Mohan.

His movies were directed by directors including K. Raghavendra Rao, A. Kodandarami Reddy, and Relangi Narasimha Rao.

His movies Padaharella Vayasu brought stardom to Sridevi to rule Telugu film industry for more than 2 decades and Pandanti Jeevitam made Vijayashanti as a face in Telugu film industry for more than 2 decades.

== Film career ==
Having profound interest in Telugu films right from his childhood ventured in film industry as an exhibitor after discontinuing his graduation. He also constructed a touring theatre named Sushma in his village.

After his stint as an exhibitor for almost ten years he along with his brothers-in-law who were also exhibitors started producing films. Initially he started by dubbing non-Telugu movies in Telugu namely Kondaveeti Veerudu starring Gemini Ganesan from Tamil, Kaksha-Siksha starring Jaishankar from Tamil, Prachanda Veerudu starring Rajkumar from Kannada.

After the stint as dubbing films he started making straight Telugu films with Padahaarella Vayasu with Sridevi and Chandra Mohan as lead under K. Raghavendra Rao direction which happened to be sensational super hit in Telugu film industry bringing stardom to Sridevi and established Midde Rama Rao as a producer in Telugu film industry to produce several super hit movies in the coming years. After the success of this movie he started producing movies under a new banner Sree Rajyalakshmi Arts.

He remade several non-Telugu super hit movies in Telugu namely Nindu Noorellu, Palletoori Monagaadu, etc. He also made movies based on popular novels written by Yandamuri Veerendranath and Malladi Venkata Krishna Murthy such as Sampoorna Premayanam and Jhansi Rani.

== Filmography ==
The films produced by him include:

- Padaharella Vayasu
- Goonda
- Palletoori Monagaadu
- Chaadasthapu Mogudu
- Jhansi Rani
- Sampoorna Premayanam
- Nindu Noorellu
- Pandanti Jeevitam
- Prema Murthulu
- Ramarajyamlo Bheemaraju
- Gundamma Gari Krishnulu
- Nippulanti Manishi
- Pachani Kapuram
- Baaryalu Jaagratha
- Ma Voori Magadu
- Athaku Koduku - Mamaku Alludu
- Pavan Subbalakshmi Preminchukunnarata
