= Nandi Awards of 1981 =

Indian Telugu film and TV awards ceremony

Nandi Awards presented annually by Government of Andhra Pradesh. First awarded in 1964.

== 1981 Nandi Awards Winners List ==
Category	Winner	Film
Best Feature Film	Bharathiraja	Seethakoka Chilaka
Second Best Feature Film	K. Balachander	Tholi Kodi Koosindi
Third Best Feature Film	K. Bapayya	Oorukichchina Maata
