= Chavapadu =

- village
- Interactive map of Chavapadu
- Location in Andhra Pradesh, India Chavapadu (India)
- Coordinates: 16.528193°N 80.384634°E
- Country: India
- State: Andhra Pradesh

Languages
  - Official: Telugu
- Time zone: UTC+5:30 (IST)
- Vehicle registration: AP

Chavapadu is a village near Amaravati in Palnadu district of Andhra Pradesh. This village has historical significance with Vasireddy clan. Famous Telugu film actor M. Balaiah was born in this village.
