= Mannava (surname) =

Mannava (Telugu: మన్నవ) is Telugu surname. Notable people with the surname include:

- Mannava Balayya, Tollywood actor
- Mannava Srikanth Prasad, Indian cricket player
