= Sampoorna Premayanam =

1980s Indian Telugu comedy film

- Theatrical release poster
- Directed by: N. B. Chakravarthy
- Written by: Satyanand (dialogues)
- Screenplay by: N. B. Chakravarthy
- Story by: Yandamuri Veerendranath
- Produced by: Midde Rama Rao
- Starring: Sobhan Babu; Jaya Prada
- Cinematography: Kannappa
- Edited by: D. Venkataratnam
- Music by: Chakravarthy
- Production company: Sri Rajyalakshmi Art Pictures
- Release date: 1984; (Note: Sources disagree on the date of the film. 1984 or 1986.)
- Running time: 139 mins
- Country: India
- Language: Telugu

Sampoorna Premayanam (transl. Full-fledged love story) is a 1980s Telugu-language comedy film directed by N. B. Chakravarthy. Produced by Midde Rama Rao, the film stars Sobhan Babu and Jayaprada with music composed by Chakravarthy. The film was a commercial success.

== Cast ==
- Sobhan Babu as Venu
- Jaya Prada as Prema
- Rao Gopal Rao as Gopala Rao
- Satyanarayana as Jagapathi Rao
- Nutan Prasad as Dayanandam
- Rajendra Prasad as Prasad
- Suthi Veerabhadra Rao as Bhadram
- Suthi Velu as Abba Rao
- Narra Venkateswara Rao as Joshi
- Hema Sundar as Ramaiah
- K. K. Sarma
- Telephone Satyanarayana as checking inspector
- Chidatala Appa Rao as Appa Rao
- Annapurna as Parvatamma
- Silk Smitha as item number

== Soundtrack ==
Sampoorna Premayanam

Film score by Chakravarthy
- Released: 1984
- Genre: Soundtrack
- Length: 19:10
- Producer: Chakravarthy

Chakravarthy chronology
Bava Maradallu (1984)	Sampoorna Premayanam (1984)	Iddaru Kodukulu (1984)

Music composed by Chakravarthy. Lyrics were written by Veturi.

S. No.	Song Title	Singers	length
1	"Sreerasthu Madhana"	S. P. Balasubrahmanyam, P. Susheela	3:02
2	"Gaali Vaana"	S. P. Balasubrahmanyam, P. Susheela	3:57
3	"Ekkadapadithe"	S. P. Balasubrahmanyam, P. Susheela	4:08
4	"Jaabilli Medha"	S. P. Balasubrahmanyam, P. Susheela	4:25
5	"Metthagaa Pillada"	P. Susheela	3:38
