= Chuttalunnaru Jagratha =

- Theatrical release poster
- Directed by: B. V. Prasad
- Screenplay by: M. Balayya
- Story by: M. Balayya
- Produced by: Alaparthi Suryanarayana
- Starring: Krishna; Sridevi
- Cinematography: S. S. Lal
- Edited by: S. P. S. Veerappa
- Music by: M. S. Viswanathan
- Production company: Alaparthi Suryanarayana
- Release date: 8 August 1980
- Country: India
- Language: Telugu

Chuttalunnaru Jagratha (transl. Beware of relatives) is a 1980 Indian Telugu-language action comedy film directed by B. V. Prasad. The film stars Krishna and Sridevi. It revolves around a man who was framed for murder, and a lookalike who aids him in finding the true killers.

Chuttalunnaru Jagratha was released on 8 August 1980 and became a commercial success. It was remade in Tamil as Pokkiri Raja (1982) and in Hindi as Mawaali (1983), with Sridevi cast in both.

== Plot ==
An industrialist's daughter and the manager of the industrialist's factory fall in love, despite initial conflicts. The industrialist's greedy relative wants his son to marry the girl, lusting for her wealth. Father and son murder the industrialist, and the factory manager is wrongfully convicted. In prison, he meets a lookalike and they plan to bring the real killers to justice.

== Cast ==
- Krishna as Ramesh & Gangulu (Dual role)
- Sridevi
- Mikkilineni
- Nutan Prasad
- Rao Gopal Rao
- Nirmalamma
- Kavitha
- Suryakantham
- Ravi Kondala Rao
- Tiger Prabhakar as Kathula Rathi
- Balayya

== Production ==
Chuttalunnaru Jagratha was directed by B. V. Prasad and produced by Alaparthi Suryanarayana under Amrutha Films. The story and screenplay were written by M. Balayya, and the dialogues by D. V. Narasaraju. Cinematography was handled by S. S. Lal, and editing by S. P. S. Veerappa.

== Soundtrack ==
The soundtrack was composed by M. S. Viswanathan.

No.	Title	Lyrics	Singer(s)	Length
1.	"Appanna Thanamana"	Kosaraju	S. P. Balasubrahmanyam, Chorus
2.	"Rekkalu Thodigi Reparepaladi"	C. Narayana Reddy	S. P. Balasubrahmanyam, P. Susheela
3.	"Kokkorokko Bavane Oyyari Bhama"	Jaladi	S. P. Balasubrahmanyam, P. Susheela
4.	"Ammi Olammi"	C. Narayana Reddy	S. P. Balasubrahmanyam, S. Janaki
5.	"Ravayya Ramesham"	C. Narayana Reddy	S. P. Balasubrahmanyam, P. Susheela
6.	"Chikkavulera Naa Konde"	Kosaraju	S. P. Balasubrahmanyam, P. Susheela

== Release and reception ==
Chuttalunnaru Jagratha was released on 8 August 1980 and became a commercial success. The film was remade in Tamil as Pokkiri Raja (1982) and Hindi as Mawaali (1983), with Sridevi returning for both.
