= Mawaali =

1983 Indian film by K. Bapayya

- Theatrical release poster
- Directed by: K. Bapaiah
- Screenplay by: Paruchuri Brothers
- Story by: M. Balaiah
- Based on: Chuttalunnaru Jagratha (1980) by M. Balaiah
- Produced by: G. Hanumantha Rao; Krishna (Presents)
- Starring: Jeetendra; Jaya Prada; Sridevi
- Cinematography: P. Devaraj
- Edited by: K. Gopal Rao
- Music by: Bappi Lahiri
- Production company: Padmalaya Studios
- Release date: 4 November 1983
- Running time: 142 minutes
- Country: India
- Language: Hindi

Mawaali (transl. Rogue) is a 1983 Indian Hindi-language masala film, produced by G. Hanumantha Rao for Padmalaya Studios banner, presented by Krishna and directed by K. Bapaiah. The film stars Jeetendra, Sridevi, Jaya Prada and has music composed by Bappi Lahiri. The film is a remake of Telugu film Chuttalunnaru Jagratha (1980) which also starred Sridevi, but in a different role.

== Cast ==
- Jeetendra as Ramesh / Gangu (Double Role)
- Jaya Prada as Nisha Verma
- Sridevi as Julie
- Kader Khan as Ajit
- Shakti Kapoor as Ranjeet
- Aruna Irani as Laila
- Nirupa Roy as Ramesh's Mother
- Prem Chopra as Julie's Father
- Shreeram Lagoo as Goyal Verma (Nisha's Father)
- Iftekhar as Public Prosecutor

== Soundtrack ==
"Ui Amma, Ui Amma, Mushkil Yeh Kya Ho Gayi" was re-created as "Ooh La La" from The Dirty Picture.

| Song | Singer |
|---|---|
| "Rama Rama, Rama Rama" | Kishore Kumar |
| "Jhopdi Mein Charpai Manush Bina Roti Padi" | Kishore Kumar, Asha Bhosle |
| "Baap Ki Kasam, Maa Ki Kasam, Teri Kasam, Jaan Ki Kasam" | Kishore Kumar, Asha Bhosle |
| "Ui Amma, Ui Amma, Mushkil Yeh Kya Ho Gayi" | Kishore Kumar, Asha Bhosle |
| "Ek Ek Do Do" | Kishore Kumar, Asha Bhosle |
