= Meenampatti =

Village in Tamil Nadu, India

Meenampatti is a village in Virudhunagar district of the Indian state of Tamil Nadu. It is 3 kilometers away from Sivakasi.

== Notable persons ==
1. Sridevi
