= Pokkiri Raja (1982 film) =

1982 film by S. P. Muthuraman

- Theatrical release poster
- Directed by: S. P. Muthuraman
- Screenplay by: Panchu Arunachalam
- Based on: Chuttalunnaru Jagratha
- Produced by: M. Kumaran; M. Saravanan; M. Balasubramaniam
- Starring: Rajinikanth; Sridevi; Radhika
- Cinematography: Babu
- Edited by: R. Vittal
- Music by: M. S. Viswanathan
- Production company: AVM Productions
- Distributed by: Ananda Films
- Release date: 14 January 1982
- Running time: 138 minutes
- Country: India
- Language: Tamil

Pokkiri Raja (transl. Rogue King) is a 1982 Indian Tamil-language action comedy film directed by S. P. Muthuraman and written by Panchu Arunachalam. A remake of the Telugu film Chuttalunnaru Jagratha (1980), it stars Rajinikanth, Sridevi and Radhika. The film revolves around a man who was framed for murder, and a lookalike who aids him in finding the true killers. It was released on 14 January 1982 and became a commercial success, running for over 100 days in theatres.

== Plot ==
Ramesh is the manager at the office of Paranthaman, an industrialist. Paranthaman strongly suspects his relatives to be stealing from him. Ramesh finds the culprit and keeps a tight leash on everything happening at the office, thereby earning the wrath of the industrialist's relatives Venkatachalam and Chandran. Ramesh and Vanaja (Paranthaman's daughter) initially find themselves at loggerheads, but eventually fall in love. Paranthaman is happy about this development until he sees Ramesh cheating on his daughter. He fires Ramesh the very same day.

Paranthaman is murdered and Vanaja also sees Ramesh in her house that same night. Ramesh is dragged to court and, based on Vanaja's testimony, declared guilty and arrested, though he realises she was threatened into committing perjury. A month into prison, Ramesh meets Raja, a soon-to-be-released convict who looks exactly like him. Raja is a petty thief who had been arrested for breaking into Paranthaman's house, and was misidentified by Vanaja as Ramesh. Together, Ramesh and Raja plan to bring the culprits to book.

With Raja's permission, Ramesh masquerades as him for three days. Venkatachalam initially attempts to have him arrested for escaping, but fails after Raja's lover Rakkayi identifies him as Raja, and takes him. Venkatachalam approaches "Raja", not knowing it is Ramesh, and tells him about Vanaja's impending marriage to his son Chandran. Ramesh rescues Vanaja from her forced marriage, tells her about Raja, how she and her father mistook him for Ramesh, and keeps her safe at his mother's house. Venkatachalam and Chandran suspect Vanaja. Ramesh marries Vanaja at his mother's request. At the end of three days, he returns to prison and switches places with Raja, who reunites with Rakkayi and tells her about Ramesh taking his place. Ramesh eventually gets bail, courtesy Vanaja.

Chandran later reveals himself and Venkatachalam as the murderers of Paranthaman, but Raja records the entire statement on tape; after Ramesh and Raja subdue Chandran and Venkatachalam's thugs, the tape is played in court, and both killers are arrested.

== Cast ==
- Rajinikanth as Ramesh and Pokkiri Raja
- Sridevi as Vanaja
- Radhika as Rakkayi
- Y. G. Mahendran as Chandran
- Veeraraghavan
- Samikannu
- I. S. R.
- S. A. Ashokan (guest appearance)
- Manorama as Chandran's mother
- R. Muthuraman as Venkatachalam

== Production ==
Pokkiri Raja is a remake of the Telugu film Chuttalunnaru Jagratha (1980), and was Rajinikanth's first film opposite Radhika. M. Saravanan of AVM Productions expressed a desire to remake it in Tamil; he wanted Rajinikanth to play the male lead. Rajinikanth initially refused as he was unimpressed with the Telugu film and character but later relented after Saravanan requested him to act. Saravanan called Visu who, after watching the film, said it could be remade well with minor changes such as further developing Radhika's character; Panchu Arunachalam wrote the screenplay. The film was colourised using Eastmancolor. It was R. Muthuraman's final film as actor and he portrayed a negative role. Since he died before the film's release, the crew brought in a dubbing artist to imitate his voice.

== Soundtrack ==
The soundtrack was composed by M. S. Viswanathan.

Track listing
No.	Title	Lyrics	Singer(s)	Length
1.	"Kadavul Padachan"	Kannadasan	S. P. Balasubrahmanyam	5:35
2.	"Pokkirikku Pokkiri Raja"	Gangai Amaran	Malaysia Vasudevan, S. Janaki	4:42
3.	"Vaada En Machigala"	Gangai Amaran	S. P. Balasubrahmanyam, S. Janaki	4:59
4.	"Vidiya Vidiya Solli"	Kannadasan	S. P. Balasubrahmanyam, P. Susheela	4:54
Total length:				20:16

== Release and reception ==
Pokkiri Raja was released on 14 January 1982, Pongal day, by Ananda Films. It was previously scheduled for release in December 1981. The film became a commercial success, running for over 100 days in theatres. Along with Murattu Kaalai (1980), it was responsible for establishing Rajinikanth as a full-fledged action hero. Nalini Sastry of Kalki wrote S. P. Muthuraman has prepared the story as an old-fashioned masala pitch with the intention of drawing the match.

== Bibliography ==
- Ramachandran, Naman, ed. (2012). Rajinikanth 12.12.12: A Birthday Special. Kasturi & Sons Ltd.
- Ramachandran, Naman (2014) [2012]. Rajinikanth: The Definitive Biography. Penguin Books. ISBN 978-0-14-342111-5.
- Saravanan, M. (2013) [2005]. AVM 60 Cinema (in Tamil) (3rd ed.). Rajarajan Pathippagam. OCLC 1158347612.
