= Nigahen: Nagina Part II =

Nigahen: Nagina Part-II
- Theatrical release poster
- Directed by: Harmesh Malhotra
- Screenplay by: Harmesh Malhotra
- Dialogues by: Dr. Achala Nagar
- Story by: Jagmohan Kapoor
- Produced by: Harmesh Malhotra
- Starring: Sunny Deol; Sridevi; Anupam Kher; Gulshan Grover; Pran
- Cinematography: V. Durgaprasad
- Edited by: Govind Dalwadi
- Music by: Laxmikant–Pyarelal
- Production company: Eastern films
- Distributed by: Eastern films
- Release date: 11 August 1989
- Country: India
- Language: Hindi

Nigahen: Nagina Part II is an Indian fantasy film directed by Harmesh Malhotra, released in 1989. The movie stars Sunny Deol, Sridevi, Anupam Kher and Gulshan Grover. It is the sequel to the Sridevi's Nagina.

== Plot ==
Following the events in Nagina, Nigahen follows the story of Neelam, the daughter of Rajiv and Rajni, and her boyfriend, Anand. After the tragic car accident of her parents, Neelam is raised by her grandfather in the city and is finally brought back to her ancestral home in the country, as a young adult (who bears a striking resemblance to her mother Rajni). There, Neelam encounters and fancies Anand, a man who was kidnapped as a child by the powerful tantric, Gorakhnath. Gorakhnath is revealed to be the disciple of Bhaironath, who tried to reveal Rajni's identity in Nagina. Claiming to have amnesia of the events, Anand woos Neelam, and she falls in love with him. Little does Neelam know that Anand does not have amnesia and is working for Gorakhnath. The tantric has set his eyes on a powerful gem (Mani), which grants the one who possesses it great powers. The only person who knows its whereabouts is Neelam, who unbeknownst to her, was hypnotized by her late mother's guardian snakes into going to the old temple from the original story and locating the gem (an event witnessed by Gorakhnath).

Ultimately, Anand inadvertently falls in love with Neelam and reveals that he is cursed by Gorakhnath. If Gorakhnath ever catches him, he will turn him into a snake and entrap him and tells Neelam that she will never be safe with him. The story culminates with Neelam inheriting the powers of her late mother. Neelam breaks Gorakhnath's curse, freeing Anand forever. Anand reveals his truth to Neelam and they profess their love for each other. They get married and fight Gorakhnath together. They manage to kill Gorakhnath and live happily ever after.

== Cast ==
- Sunny Deol as Anand – Neelam's boyfriend, later husband
- Sridevi in a dual role as
  - Neelam – Anand's girlfriend, later wife
  - Rajni – Neelam's mother
- Anupam Kher as Gorakhnath – Bhaironath's disciple
- Gulshan Grover as Kumar
- Pran as Raja sahab – Neelam's grandfather
- Aruna Irani as Gayatri
- Anjana Mumtaz as Shanti Devi – Anand's mother
- Jagdeep as Munshi
- Amrish Puri as Bhaironath's voice
- Rishi Kapoor (archive footage) as Rajiv – Rajni's husband, Neelam's late father

== Music and soundtrack ==
Nigahen

Soundtrack album by Laxmikant–Pyarelal
- Released: 1989
- Venue: Mumbai
- Studio: Mehboob
- Genre: Feature film soundtrack
- Length: 32:39
- Language: Hindi
- Label: T-Series
- Producer: Laxmikant–Pyarelal

The music of the film was composed Laxmikant–Pyarelal and the lyrics of the songs were penned by Anand Bakshi. The full album is recorded by Anuradha Paudwal, Kavita Krishnamurthy, Mohammed Aziz and Suresh Wadkar.

#	Title	Singer(s)
1	"Dil Se Nikal Kar Dil Ko Gayee Hain"	Suresh Wadkar, Anuradha Paudwal
2	"Kise Dhoondta Hai Pagal Sapere"	Anuradha Paudwal
3	"Khel Wohi Phir Aaj To Khela"	Kavita Krishnamurthy
4	"Saawan Ke Jhoolon Ne"	Mohammed Aziz
5	"Saara Saara Din Tum Kaam Karoge"	Kavita Krishnamurthy
