= Neramu Siksha =

- Theatrical release poster
- Directed by: K. Viswanath
- Written by: Samudrala; Modukuri Johnson (dialogues)
- Screenplay by: K. Viswanath
- Story by: M. Balayya
- Based on: Crime and Punishment by Fyodor Dostoevsky
- Starring: Krishna; Bharathi; M. Balayya; Kaikala Satyanarayana; Kanta Rao
- Edited by: S. P. S. Veerappa
- Music by: S. Rajeswara Rao
- Release date: 27 July 1973
- Country: India
- Language: Telugu

Neramu Siksha (transl. Crime and punishment) is a 1973 Indian Telugu-language film directed by K. Viswanath who co-wrote the film with M. Balayya. The film is an adaptation of Fyodor Dostoevsky's Crime and Punishment (1866). The film received positive reviews from critics. The film was remade in Tamil as Needhikku Thalaivanangu (1976) and in Hindi as Shikshaa (1979).

== Plot ==
Vijay is the son of a rich business couple, Rajasekharam and Santamma. Bharathi is also a daughter of another rich man, Narayana Rao. Krishna has grown up without knowing or facing any problems and gets a new car. While driving in competition with his friend Satyam, he accidentally kills Chinnayya's brother and blinds Chinnayya. Somehow this incident comes to the knowledge of Rajasekharam and he confronts Vijay and throws him out of house.

Vijay then ends up as one of the servants at Narayana Rao's home. He also gets to know Chinnayya and his family. He realizes the intensity of his mistake and vows to make Chinnayya and his family's life better. Chinnayya on the other hand, vows to kill the person responsible for his brother's death and his blindness. Knowing about his fate in the hands of Chinnayya, Vijay keeps helping them. Finally, Chinnayya learns about Vijay and forgives him.

== Cast ==
- Krishna as Vijay (Vinay/Devudayya/Pichayya)
- Bharathi as Sujatha
- M. Balayya as Chinnayya
- Kaikala Satyanarayana as Satya Murthy
- Kanta Rao as Rajasekharam
- Rao Gopal Rao as Narayana Rao
- Mada as Pujari
- Dr. Sivaramakrishnayya as Doctor
- Arja Janardhana Rao
- Krishna Kumari as Janakamma
- Pandari Bai as Santamma
- P. R. Varalakshmi as Prabha
- Pushpa Kumari as Kantham
- Master Visweswara Rao as Budugu
- R. Narayana Murthy as Villager (special appearance in the song "Ramuni Bantunura")

== Soundtrack ==
- "Chesina Papam Needi Chitikina Bratukinkokaridi" (Lyrics: Devulapalli Krishnasastri) – S.P. Balasubrahmanyam
- "Daagudu Muta Dandakor"- S.P. Balasubrahmanyam, B.R. Latha, Bhaskar Sr
- "Emandi Saaru O Batlaru Doragaru"- S.P. Balasubrahmanyam, S. Janaki
- "One Two One Two" - S. P. Balasubrahmanyam, G. Anand
- "Ramuni Bantunura"- S. P. Balasubrahmanyam
- "Vesavu Bhale Veshalu" - P. Susheela
