= Ramarajyamlo Bheemaraju =

- Theatrical release poster
- Directed by: A. Kodandarami Reddy
- Written by: Satyanand (dialogues)
- Screenplay by: A. Kodandarami Reddy
- Story by: Vasundhara
- Produced by: Midde Rama Rao
- Starring: Krishna; Sridevi
- Cinematography: A. Venkat
- Edited by: D. Venkataratnam
- Music by: Chakravarthy
- Production company: Sri Rajyalakshmi Art Pictures
- Release date: 28 July 1983
- Running time: 150 mins
- Country: India
- Language: Telugu

Ramarajyamlo Bheemaraju is a 1983 Indian Telugu-language action film directed by A. Kodandarami Reddy. It stars Krishna and Sridevi, with music composed by Chakravarthy. It is produced by Midde Rama Rao under the Sri Rajyalakshmi Art Pictures banner.

== Cast ==
- Krishna as Bheemaraju / Krishna Raja Kumar
- Sridevi as Jyothi
- Rao Gopal Rao as Ramaraju
- Satyanarayana as Lakshmipathi
- Allu Ramalingaiah as Kailasam
- Jaggayya as Raghupati Raja
- Chandra Mohan as Ramudu
- Rajendra Prasad as Satish
- Suthi Veerabhadra Rao as Veerabhadrayya
- Suthi Velu as Kanaka Rao
- Rallapalli as Rajayya
- KK Sarma as Priest
- Chalapathi Rao as Polayya
- Mallikarjuna Rao as Rangadu
- Sangeeta as Sundari
- Sivaranjani as Seeta
- Nirmalamma as Suvachala

== Soundtrack ==
Ramarajyamlo Bheermaraju

Film score by Chakravarthy
- Released: 1983
- Genre: Soundtrack
- Length: 25:38
- Producer: Chakravarthy

Chakravarthy chronology
Adavi Simhalu (1983)	Ramarajyamlo Bheermaraju (1983)	Shakti (1983)

The music was composed by Chakravarthy, with the lyrics written by Veturi.

S. No.	Song title	Singers	length
1	"Chuputhone Chudakunda"	S. P. Balasubrahmanyam, P. Susheela	4:12
2	"Kukulu Kulokoyemma"	S. P. Balasubrahmanyam, P. Susheela	4:00
3	"Anaado Neeku Naaku"	S. P. Balasubrahmanyam, P. Susheela	3:47
4	"Tapatapa Tadisina Koka"	S. P. Balasubrahmanyam, P. Susheela	4:17
5	"Katha Cheputani"	S. P. Balasubrahmanyam, P. Susheela	4:16
6	"Kaboyi Sreemathi"	P. Susheela, S. P. Sailaja	5:06
