= Mannava Balayya =

Indian actor, filmmaker (1930–2022)

M. Balayya
- Born: 9 April 1930; Chavapadu, Guntur district, British Raj
- Died: 9 April 2022 (aged 92); Hyderabad, Telangana, India
- Occupations: Actor; writer; director; producer
- Years active: 1957–2022
- Children: 3

Mannava Balayya (9 April 1930 – 9 April 2022) was an Indian actor, writer, director, and producer known for his work in Telugu cinema. He appeared in 300 films during his career.

== Early life and career ==
Mannava Balayya was born in Chavupadu, Amaravathi mandalam, Guntur district to Mannava Annapurnamma and Guravayya Chowdary. He studied Engineering B.E. (mechanical) at Guindy Engineering College in Chennai. Inspired by the drama during his college days, Balayya ventured into movies with guidance from Tapi Chanakya.

He made his debut as an actor with Ethuku Pai Ethu, a social film directed by Tapi Chanakya and made by Sarathi Studios. Films such as Parvati Kalyanam established him as an actor. He acted in nearly three hundred films and established Amrutha Films in 1970.

He penned a play, Nalupu Telupu, later made into Chelleli Kapuram, for which he received the Gold Nandi Award from the Andhra Pradesh Government. He also penned films, including Neramu Siksha and Annadammula Katha. He was awarded the Raghupathi Venkaiah Award in 2012.

== Filmography ==
This is partial filmography of M. Balayya. Please help by expanding it.

=== Actor ===
Year	Title	Role	Ref.
1958	Ettuku Pai Ettu		
1958	Parvathi Kalyanam	Lord Shiva	
1959	Bhagya Devata	Doctor	
1959	Manorama		
1960	Chivaraku Migiledi	Prakash Rao	
1960	Kumkuma Rekha		
1961	Krishna Prema	Lord Krishna	
1962	Mohini Rukmangada		
1962	Sri Srikakula Andhra Mahavishnuvu Katha		
1963	Irugu Porugu	Ramu / Johnny	
1964	Babruvahana	Balarama	
1964	Bobbili Yudham	Dharmarayudu	
1964	Vivaha Bandham		
1964	Manchi Manishi	DSP	
1965	Pandava Vanavasam	Arjuna	
1966	Shri Krishna Pandaviyam	Yudhishthira	
1966	Paduka Pattabhishekam	Bharata	
1966	Mohini Bhasmasura	Narada	
1966	Monagallaku Monagadu		
1966	Palnati Yudham		
1968	Nene Monaganni		
1970	Lakshmi Kataksham	Vinayadandudu	
1970	Suguna Sundari Katha	Shiva	
1971	Vikramarka Vijayam		
1972	Bala Bharatam	Mahendra	
1972	Korada Rani	Rani's (Jyothi Lakshmi) brother-in-law	
1973	Neramu Siksha	Chinnaiah	
1974	Alluri Seetharama Raju	Ghantam Dora	
1975	Annadammula Katha	Satyam	
1976	Bhakta Kannappa	Lord Shiva	
1976	Ramarajyamlo Raktapasam		
1977	Kurukshetram	Yudhishtira (DharmaRaja)	
1977	Chiranjeevi Rambabu	Raghavaiah	
1978	Sahasavanthudu	Srinivasa Rao	
1980	Bebbuli	Temple Priest	
1980	Thathayya Premaleelalu		
1983	Nijam Chebithe Nerama	Commissioner of Police	
1986	Tandra Paparayudu		
1986	Simhasanam		
1987	Jaganmatha	Lord Shiva	
1988	Prithviraj	Kameswara Rao	
1990	Doctor Bhavani		
1992	Peddarikam	Sukanya's father	
1992	Alexander		
1993	Ankuram	Sindhura's father	
1993	Radha Saradhi		
1993	Kaliyugam		
1993	Major Chandrakanth		
1993	Gaayam	Chari	
1994	Pachcha Toranam		
1994	Neram		
1994	Yamaleela	Brahma	
1994	Gharana Alludu	Prakash Rao	
1994	Yes Nenante Nene	D.I.G.	
1995	Muddayi Muddugumma		
1995	Real Hero		
1995	Telugu Veera Levara	Ramaraju's father	
1996	Sarada Bullodu	Chief Engineer	
1996	Bombay Priyudu		
1996	Jabilamma Pelli		
1997	Korukunna Priyudu	Vijay's father	
1997	Annamayya	Narayana Suri	
1997	Allari Pellikoduku		
1997	Bobbili Dora		
1997	Pelli Sandadi		
1998	Suprabhatam	Vasundhara's father	
1998	Gamyam	Police Commissioner	
1998	Pandaga		
1998	Yuvaratna Rana		
1998	Sri Ramulayya		
1998	Choodalani Vundi		
1998	Sreevarante Maavare		
1999	Sambayya		
2000	Sivanna		
2002	Manmadhudu	Abhiram's grandfather	
2002	Tappu Chesi Pappu Koodu	Zamindar Bhupathi	
2002	Dhanalakshmi I Love You		
2003	Okariki Okaru	Swapna's grandfather	
2004	Malliswari	Ram Mohan Rao	
2004	Seshadri Naidu		
2004	Mass	Anjali's grandfather	
2006	Veedhi		
2006	Bharati	Bharati's grandfather	
2007	Yamagola Malli Modalayindi		
2008	Pandurangadu		
2008	Adivishnu		
2008	Ekaloveyudu		
2009	Neramu Siksha	Judge	
2009	Mitrudu	Aditya's grandfather	
2010	Prasthanam	Dasaradha Rama Naidu	
2011	Sri Rama Rajyam	Vasishta	
2012	Devaraya	Mahamamthri Thimmarusu	
2013	Ramachari	Chief Minister Harishchandra Prasad	

=== Producer ===
Year	Movie title	Actors	Info
1971	Chelleli Kapuram	Sobhan Babu, Vanisri, Nagabhushanam	Also Story Writer
1973	Neramu Siksha	Krishna, Bharati	Also Story Writer
1975	Annadammula Katha		
1977	Eenati Bandam Yenatido	Krishna, Jaya Prada	Music: S. Rajeswara Rao
1978	Prema Paga	Murali Mohan	
1980	Chuttalunnaru Jagratha	Krishna, Sridevi	
1981	Oorukichina Maata	Chiranjeevi, Madhavi, Kavitha	
1983	Kirayi Alludu	Krishna, Jayasudha, Satyannarayana	
1986	Pasupu Taadu	Mannava Tulasiram Prasad, Sarath Babu, Radha	
1987	Allari Paandavulu	Mannava Tulasiram Prasad, Ashwini	Music: Raj–Koti

=== Director ===
Year	Movie title	Actors	Info
1983	Nijam Chebite Nerama?	Krishnam Raju, Jaya Prada	
1984	Maha Manishi		Story Writer and Screenplay
1986	Pasupu Tadu		Story Writer and Screenplay
1994	Police Alludu		

=== Story writer ===
Year	Movie title	Actors
1971	Chellili Kapuram	Sobhan Babu, Vanisri
1973	Neramu Siksha	Krishna, Bharati
1981	Chuttalunnaru Jagratha	Krishna
1985	Wafadaar	Rajinikanth, Shakti Kapoor
1986	Pasupu Tadu	

== Awards ==
- Nandi Award for Second Best Story Writer – Oorukichchina Maata (1981)

== See also ==
- Raghupathi Venkaiah Award
