= Malini Iyer =

Indian sitcom series

- Genre: Comedy
- Created by: Satish Kaushik; Sanjay Chhel; Nikhil K. Saini
- Written by: Sanjay Chhel
- Directed by: Satish Kaushik
- Starring: see below
- Theme music composer: Himesh Reshammiya
- Opening theme: "Malini Iyer" by KK and Sapna Mukherjee
- Country of origin: India
- Original language: Hindi
- No. of seasons: 1
- No. of episodes: 184

Production
- Producer: Boney Kapoor
- Cinematography: Bashir Ali
- Camera setup: Multi-camera
- Running time: 23 minutes

Original release
- Network: Sahara One
- Release: 19 January 2004 – 11 January 2005

Malini Iyer is an Indian sitcom that aired on Sahara One starring Sridevi. The series is produced Boney Kapoor and directed by Satish Kaushik. The series premiered on 19 January 2004.

== Overview ==
The story revolves round the life of a south Indian Tamil Brahmin girl, Malini Iyer who marries a Punjabi guy, and now how she manages to bring both the cultures together. The problems arises when Malini moves to Punjab with her husband, where she has to follow a different culture and rituals altogether. However, she retains her individuality while she loves the family she married into. As a woman of values and principles, she takes utmost care in following the customs and rituals of both sides, the South and North.

== Cast ==
- Sridevi Kapoor as Malini Iyer
- Mahesh Thakur as Pankaj Sabharwal
- Nasirr Khan as Anthony
- Vinay Pathak
- Tanushree Kaushal
- Kamlesh Oza as Bobby Agarwal
- Pallavi Dutt
- Sunila Karambelkar As Naagin
- Nupur Alankaar Shrivastav
- Dilip Joshi as Ram Jane
