= Oorukichina Maata =

Oorukichchina Maata
- Theatrical release poster
- Directed by: M. Balayya
- Written by: D.V. Narasa Raju (Dialogues)
- Screenplay by: M. Balaiah
- Produced by: Suryanarayana Alaparthi; Venkat Rao Mannava
- Starring: Chiranjeevi; Sudhakar; Madhavi; Kavitha
- Cinematography: S.S. Lal
- Music by: M. S. Viswanathan; Lyricists-; C. Narayana Reddy; Jhaladhi
- Production company: Amrutha Films
- Distributed by: Amrutha Films
- Release date: 21 June 1981 (India)
- Running time: 139 minutes
- Country: India
- Language: Telugu

Oorukichina Maata (transl. Promise made to the village) is a 1981 Telugu-language drama film written and directed by M. Balayya starring Chiranjeevi, Sudhakar, Madhavi, and Kavitha. The film was remade in Tamil as Oorum Uravum (1982) starring Sivaji Ganesan. The film won two Nandi Awards.

== Cast ==
- Chiranjeevi as Ramudu
- Sudhakar as Koti Nagulu
- Madhavi as Roopa
- Kavitha as Sita
- Narayana Rao as Gireesham
- Kanta Rao as Pratapa Rao
- Giribabu as Forest Guard
- Srilakshmi as Roopa's friend
- Raavi Kondala Rao as priest
- Mada Venkateswara Rao as Daivadheenam
- Vankayala Satyanarayana as Raghavulu
- Jhansi as Chukkamma

== Soundtrack ==
1. "Aadindhi Ooru", singers S.P. Balu, P.Susheela, lyricist C. Narayana Reddy
2. "Choopullo Chuttesi", singers: S.P. Balu, P. Susheela. lyricist C. Narayana Reddy
3. "Horugalilo", lyricist C. Narayana Reddy
4. "Kodi Koose Podde Poddu", lyricist C. Narayana Reddy
5. "Pairagali Paita Laguthunte", singers S.P. Balu, P. Susheela, lyricist Jaladi Rajarao
6. "Vachi Poraa Rangaa", lyricist C. Narayana Reddy

== Awards ==
Nandi Awards - 1981

- Third Best Feature Film - Bronze - M. Balayya
- Second Best Story Writer - M. Balayya
