= Nagina (1986 film) =

1986 Indian film by Harmesh Malhotra

- Theatrical Release Poster
- Directed by: Harmesh Malhotra
- Written by: Story: Jagmohan Kapoor; Dialogues: Dr. Achala Nagar
- Screenplay by: Ravi Kapoor
- Produced by: Harmesh Malhotra
- Starring: Sridevi; Rishi Kapoor; Komal Mahuvakar; Amrish Puri; Prem Chopra
- Cinematography: V. Durga Prasad
- Edited by: Govind Dalwadi
- Music by: Laxmikant-Pyarelal
- Production company: Eastern Films
- Release date: 28 November 1986
- Country: India
- Language: Hindi
- Box office: ₹13 crore (equivalent to ₹193 crore or US$20 million in 2026)

Nagina is a 1986 Indian fantasy romance film, produced and directed by Harmesh Malhotra, with a screenplay written by Ravi Kapoor and story by Jagmohan Kapoor. The film stars Sridevi as Rajni, a Nāginī who marries a civilian to avenge the death of her spouse at the hands of an evil saint. It also stars Rishi Kapoor, Komal Mahuvakar, Amrish Puri, Sushma Seth and Prem Chopra. Then dubbed in Telugu as Naagini.

Nagina was theatrically released on 28 November 1986. Upon its release, it was a widespread success, grossing over ₹13 crore at the box office, becoming the second-highest-grossing Indian film of 1986. The success of the film proved to be one of the biggest blockbusters of the year. And a major watershed moment in Indian cinema, as the film, despite being a woman-centric movie, became a massive commercial success. Nagina is credited as being the film which established Sridevi's position as the biggest female star of the 1980s. A sequel to the film was released; Nigahen: Nagina Part II (1989), but failed commercially. Today, Nagina is considered one of Sridevi's finest performances.

== Plot ==
Rajiv, who hails from a wealthy land-owning family, returns from abroad after completing his education and lives in a palatial home with his mother, who would like him to marry a beautiful young woman named Vijaya Singh, the only daughter of Thakur Ajay Singh. Rajiv, however, meets and falls in love with Rajni, who is an orphan without connections. When Rajiv informs his mother of his intent to marry Rajni, she refuses to give her blessings, but relents after a favourable meeting with Rajni. But Thakur Ajay Singh, who has been managing Rajiv's family estate for years hoping his daughter will marry Rajiv one day, does not like that. He sends his goons to kill Rajni but she is saved by two snakes. The marriage is arranged, and they enjoy their marriage. One day, Bhairo Nath, a sadhu capable of controlling snakes, arrives at their home and senses a strange presence. When he sees Rajni he informs Rajiv's mother that Rajni is an Ichchadhari Naagin, a female shape-shifting venomous Cobra who has married Rajiv to avenge the death of her spouse during Rajiv's childhood. Rajni's real form is revealed to Rajiv's mother and she is shocked but Rajni promises her that no harm will come to her family due to Rajni. Rajiv is attacked by Thakur Ajay Singh's goons and he is in critical condition in hospital. Bhairo Nath sends a snake to kill Rajiv, in hospital, Rajni transforms into he snake form and fights off the snakes eventually killing him.

One day as Rajiv's mother is returning from a visit to Bhero Nath, she finds Rajni in her car and is scared of her. Rajni tells her the truth why she can't leave Rajiv. Years ago at Rajiv's sixth birthday in an old mansion's Ruins, he was bitten by a snake and died. Bhero Nath, who happened to be passing by arrived and charmed the same snake back and boy woke up. But before he realized that the snake was an Ichchadhari Naag who possessed not only shape shifting ability but also a powerful gem, he is surrounded by people who chant in praise of miracle he performed. He is unable to chase the snake. The snake was Rajni's spouse, and Bhero Nath took his life and put in Rajiv's body. That is why Rajiv had nightmares as a child and was sent abroad. Upon his return, Rajni's plan was to kill him and have his soul re-transferred to her spouse's body but seeing his mother's love for him she abandons her plan and instead married him as he still had soul of her spouse. The Old temple still has the dead body of her snake spouse which is protected by the two snakes who have always been protecting Rajni as well.

Still not convinced, Rajiv's mother sends him away and invites Bhairo and his disciples to capture and take Rajni away. Unknown to her, Bhero has an agenda - to get the information about the gem (Mani) from Rajni. In order to change into her snake form, Rajni sways to the tunes of a snake charmer's flute. However, when Rajiv comes into the house, Rajni escapes to the old Haweli, only to be caught by Bhairo. To end his plan, Rajni throws the dead body of her snake spouse into the fire. An enraged Rajiv engages in a fight with Bhairo, who is bitten by two snakes and dies. But as he takes his last breath, he prays that Rajni be transformed into a woman from a snake which is granted.

Rajiv and Rajni live happily ever after.

== Cast ==
- Sridevi as Rajni an Ichchadhari Naagin
- Rishi Kapoor as Rajiv
- Komal Mahuvakar as Vijaya Singh
- Amrish Puri as Bhairon Nath
- Sushma Seth as Rajiv's mother
- Prem Chopra as Thakur Ajay Singh, Vijaya's father
- Guddi Maruti as Bhanumati, Munshiji's wife
- Jagdeep as Munshiji
- Viju Khote as Mahaveer Singh, Ajay Singh's henchmen
- Pinchoo Kapoor as advocate
- Lalita Kumari as Bhanumati's mother, Munshiji's mother-in-law
- Baby Guddu as Child Rajiv

== Soundtrack ==
The music for the 1986 movie Nagina was released by T-Series. The label is also known as Super Cassettes Industries Ltd. The film's music was provided by Laxmikant-Pyarelal. Lyrics were written by Anand Bakshi. The soundtrack contained a total of five songs, one of which was a duet and the rest were all solo numbers. There is also a song called “Aaj Kal Yaad Kuch Aur Rehta Nahin” which isn’t in the film’s soundtrack but it was filmed on sridevi rishi and included in the movie

=== Hindi version ===
All lyrics are written by Anand Bakshi

Track list
| No. | Title | Singer(s) | Length |
|---|---|---|---|
| 1. | "Tune Bechain Itna Ziada Kiya" | Mohammed Aziz, Anuradha Paudwal | 5:36 |
| 2. | "Main Teri Dushman Dushman Tu" | Lata Mangeshkar | 7:03 |
| 3. | "Balma Tum Balma Ho Mere Khali" | Kavita Krishnamurthy | 6:16 |
| 4. | "Bhooli Bisri Ek Kahani" | Anuradha Paudwal | 6:57 |
| Total length: | | | 32:22 |

=== Telugu version ===
Lyrics were written by Rajasri and Gona Vijayaratnam.

Track list
| No. | Title | Lyrics | Singer(s) | Length |
|---|---|---|---|---|
| 1. | "Murise Bangaru (Tune Bechain Itna Ziada Kiya)" | Rajasri | Mano, Swarnalatha | 5:42 |
| 2. | "Rare Raja (Rara Raja) - (Bhooli Bisri Ek Kahani)" | Gona Vijayaratnam | K. S. Chithra | 5:44 |
| 3. | "Prema Prema (Balma Tum Balma Ho Mere Khali)" | Rajasri | Swarnalatha | 4:29 |
| 4. | "Manthrala Yamuda (Main Teri Dushman Dushman Tu)" | Gona Vijayaratnam | K. S. Chithra | 7:13 |
| Total length: | | | | 23:09 |

== Release ==
=== Reception ===
According to Taran Adarsh, Nagina turned out to be the biggest blockbuster of the year, with Box Office India stating that Sridevi remained "the undisputed No.1". The movie was appreciated for its screenplay, dialogues and direction. Named one of the best snake fantasy films by Yahoo, Times of India ranked Nagina as one of the 'Top 10 Snake Films of Hindi Cinema'. Sridevi's climax dance number "Main Teri Dushman" also remains one of the best snake dances in Bollywood with Desi Hits calling it "one of Sridevi's most iconic dance numbers... that still gives fans goose bumps" and iDiva describing it as "the stuff of movie legends".

In 2013, Sridevi was given the Filmfare Special Award for her performances in Nagina as well as Mr. India (1987) to recognise her work at that time.

=== Box office ===
The film was a commercial success, grossing approximately ₹4.75 cr.

=== Sequel ===
This movie was followed by a sequel in 1989 called Nigahen: Nagina Part II.

== Technical specifications ==
| Runtime | 2 hr 23 min 03 Sec (143 min 03 Sec) |
| Audio mix | Mono |
| Color | Color (Eastmancolor) |
| Aspect Ratio | 1.37 : 1 |
| Laboratory | Film Center, Mumbai, India |
| Negative Format | 35 mm |
| Printed Film Format | 35 mm |

== Legacy ==
According to the Bengali author Suman Sen, Nagina was the main inspiration to write his novel Sarpa Manav: Nagmoni Rohosyo. The author also had mentioned the film's name in a small part.
