= Kalavari Samsaram =

- Theatrical release poster
- Directed by: K. S. Rami Reddy
- Written by: D. V. Narasa Raju (dialogues)
- Screenplay by: K. S. Rami Reddy
- Story by: Maadireddy Sulachana
- Based on: Agni Pariksha (Novel)
- Produced by: Donepudi Brahmaiah
- Starring: Krishna; Sridevi
- Cinematography: V. S. R. Swamy
- Edited by: V. Dinesh; K. Nageswara Rao; Satyam
- Music by: K. V. Mahadevan
- Production company: Maheswari Combines
- Release date: 3 December 1982
- Running time: 128 mins
- Country: India
- Language: Telugu

Kalavari Samsaram (transl. Wealthy Family) is a 1982 Telugu-language drama film directed by K. S. Rami Reddy. It stars Krishna and Sridevi, with music composed by K. V. Mahadevan. The film is based on Maadireddy Sulachana's Agni Pariksha (Novel).

== Cast ==
- Krishna as Vishnu
- Sridevi as Sujatha
- Satyanarayana as Kodandaramayya
- Allu Ramalingaiah as Chalapathi
- Giri Babu as Raghu
- Sudhakar as Uday
- Rajendra Prasad as Rajeev
- Sakshi Ranga Rao as Subbaramayya
- Potti Prasad as Gumastha
- Haranath as Vasanthi's brother
- Telephone Satyanarayana as Doctor
- Madan Mohan as Raghavayya
- Geetha as Vasanthi
- Pandari Bai as Kanthamma
- Suryakantam as Vasanthi's mother
- Rohini as Sudha
- Jayamalini as item number
- Shubha as Sarala
- Jhansi as Suseelamma
- Athili Lakshmi as Kamalamma
- P. R. Varalakshmi as Sumathi
- Kakinada Shyamala as Sujatha's sister
- Nirmalamma as Sujatha's mother

== Music ==
Kalavari Samsaram

Film score by K. V. Mahadevan
- Released: 1983
- Genre: Soundtrack
- Length: 16:46
- Label: His Master's Voice
- Producer: K. V. Mahadevan

K. V. Mahadevan chronology
Krishnavataram (1982)	Kalavari Samsaram (1983)	Ekalavya (1982)

Music was composed by K. V. Mahadevan. Audio soundtrack was released on His Master's Voice.

S.No	Song title	lyrics	Singers	length
1	"Sankuraathri Pandaga"	Acharya Aatreya	S. P. Balasubrahmanyam	4:10
2	"Macchaleni Chandamaamaa"	Veturi	S. P. Balasubrahmanyam, P. Susheela	4:30
3	"Kasikasi Katnam"	Veturi	S. P. Balasubrahmanyam, P. Susheela	4:14
4	"Iddaramokatai"	Veturi	S. P. Balasubrahmanyam, P. Susheela	4:07
5	"Rasikudavani"	Narala Rami Reddy	S. Janaki	3:45
