= 16 Vayathinile =

1977 film by Bharathiraja

- Theatrical release poster
- Directed by: Bharathirajaa
- Written by: Bharathirajaa
- Produced by: S. A. Rajkannu
- Starring: Kamal Haasan; Sridevi; Rajinikanth
- Cinematography: P. S. Nivas
- Edited by: R. Bhaskaran
- Music by: Ilaiyaraaja
- Production company: Sri Amman Creations
- Distributed by: Sri Amman Creations
- Release date: 15 September 1977
- Running time: 139 minutes
- Country: India
- Language: Tamil
- Budget: ₹5 lakh

16 Vayathinile (Note: The title was alternatively spelt as 16 Vayathinile!) (transl. At age 16; read as Pathinaaru Vayathinile) is a 1977 Indian Tamil-language romantic drama film co-written and directed by Bharathiraja (in his directorial debut). The film stars Kamal Haasan, Sridevi, and Rajinikanth, with Gandhimathi, Sathyajith and Goundamani in supporting roles. It focuses on the strengths and vulnerabilities of Mayil (Sridevi), a 16-year-old schoolgirl, and the challenges she faces and overcomes.

The film was originally titled Mayil, and was set to be funded by the National Film Development Corporation of India. When they backed out, it was picked up by S. A. Rajkannu who produced it under his banner Shri Amman Creations, and eventually retitled. 16 Vayathinile became the first Tamil film to be shot predominantly outdoors; Tamil films were primarily filmed in Madras studios. Its soundtrack album and background score were composed by Ilaiyaraaja, with cinematography by P. S. Nivas. P. Kalaimani wrote the film's dialogue.

16 Vayathinile was released on 15 September 1977, and was distributed by Rajkannu himself since no distributor was willing to buy it. Although written off by the media as an experimental film that would fail, the film received critical praise for Bharathiraja's script, Ilaiyaraaja's music and the performances of Haasan, Sridevi and Rajinikanth. It was commercially successful, with a 175-day theatrical run. It won numerous awards, including the National Film Award for Best Female Playback Singer for S. Janaki; the Filmfare Award for Best Actor (Tamil) for Haasan and Special Commendation Award for Performance for Sridevi; and four State Awards, including Best Director for Bharathiraja and Best Actor for Haasan.

16 Vayathinile attained cult status in Tamil cinema and is considered a trendsetter of films depicting realistic portrayals of rural life. Making stars of its director and lead actors, it was remade in Telugu as Padaharella Vayasu (1978), in Hindi as Solva Sawan (1979), and in Malay as Melati Putih (1984).

== Plot ==
Mayil is a 16-year old schoolgirl who lives in a village with Kuruvammal, her mother. Kuruvammal also takes care of a limping orphan who is dismissively called "Chappani" (Lame) by the villagers and does whatever he can to earn a living. Mayil's ambition is to become a teacher, and she hopes to marry a sophisticated, educated man; although Chappani is in love with her, she does not reciprocate his love.

Sathyajith, an urban veterinarian, arrives in the village to work and falls in love with Mayil. Believing that Sathyajith is the right person for her, Mayil falls in love with him, to the point of refusing an opportunity to attend a teacher-training course in Madras to remain with him. Despite loving Sathyajith, she does not allow him to exploit her sexually, which disappoints him. Never intending a serious relationship with Mayil, he proceeds to his native place to marry another woman. When Mayil begs Sathyajith not to leave her, he says he befriended her for pleasure—not marriage.

A dejected Mayil confesses about her relationship with Sathyajith to Kuruvammal, who quickly plans to betroth her to someone else. The village ruffian Parattaiyan—who lusts for Mayil—spreads rumours about her relationship with Sathyajith. Because of this, Mayil's engagement plans are halted and nobody from the village is willing to betroth her. Unable to bear the shame, Kuruvammal dies and leaves Chappani to take care of Mayil.

Chappani takes good care of Mayil, cheering her up when she needs it. She warms to Chappani, making him more confident and assertive and grooming him and his manners, to the surprise of many in the village. Mayil tells him to slap anyone calling him "Chappani" and to respond only to those addressing him by his name, Gopalakrishnan. When Sathyajith and Parattaiyan dismissively call him "Chappani", Gopalakrishnan slaps them. Mayil and Gopalakrishnan celebrate his newfound courage. An insulted Parattaiyan later beats Gopalakrishnan badly. Mayil saves him and spits on Parattaiyan in revenge.

Mayil decides to marry Gopalakrishnan, and sends him to the nearby town for buying wedding supplies. Learning of Gopalakrishnan's absence, Parattai goes to Mayil's house and tries to rape her. Gopalakrishnan returns to Mayil's house and pleads with Parattaiyan to leave her. When Parattaiyan refuses, Gopalakrishnan kills him with a rock and is arrested. He promises Mayil that he will return, and she waits every day for him.

== Cast ==
- Kamal Haasan as Gopalakrishnan (Chappani)
- Sridevi as Mayil
- Rajinikanth as Parattaiyan
- Gandhimathi as Kuruvammal
- Sathyajith as Sathyajith
- Goundamani as Koothu
- Gemini Rajeshwari as Velaiyamma
- K. Bhagyaraj as a village physician (uncredited)

== Production ==
=== Development ===
Bharathiraja planned to write and direct a black-and-white film titled Mayil that would be funded by the National Film Development Corporation of India (NDFC), but according to him, the NFDC withdrew "at the last minute" without specifying a reason. The project was eventually picked up by S. A. Rajkannu who produced it under his banner Sri Amman Creations. Mayil was eventually re-titled 16 Vayathinile, and marked Bharathirajaa's screenwriting and directorial debut. Its dialogue was written by P. Kalaimani. P. S. Nivas was signed as cinematographer and R. Bhaskaran as editor. Chitra Lakshmanan and K. Bhagyaraj worked as assistant directors. The latter provided suggestions for scenes and dialogues. The film was launched at AVM Recording Studios.

=== Casting ===
When the film was in development in black-and-white, Bharathiraja envisioned Nagesh in the role of Chappani. After it was changed to colour, he wanted Lakshmanan to sign Kamal Haasan for the role of Chappani, expecting to pay Haasan ₹15,000 (Note: The exchange rate in 1977 was 8.7386 Indian rupees (₹) per 1 US dollar (US$)) since the actor had received ₹17,000 (Note: The exchange rate in 1975 was 8.3759 Indian rupees (₹) per 1 US dollar (US$).) for Aayirathil Oruthi (1975). When Haasan asked for ₹30,000, Lakshmanan suggested that Bharathiraja offer the role to Sivakumar since the production unit could not afford Haasan's request; however, Bharathiraja saw Haasan as the ideal choice and agreed to pay him ₹27,000. In 2017, Haasan recalled, "Years ago, a man sporting a soiled dhoti and shirt came to my office to narrate a script. Had I turned the offer down on the basis of his dirty clothes, I wouldn't have been here talking to you. After listening to the script, I realised that he was such a genius and the movie was the cult classic [16 Vayathinile], and he was none other than ace Bharathiraja sir".

Rajinikanth was cast as the village ruffian Parattaiyan. Bharathiraja stated in 2013 that although had finalised ₹3,000 as the salary for Rajinikanth after the actor initially charged ₹5,000, he was ultimately paid ₹2,500. Some years later, he stated that Rajinikanth's salary was lower than Haasan's due to him not being an established star then but claimed uncertainty about the exact salary details. However, in another interview, he said ₹3,000 was the actor's final pay. 16 Vayathinile marked Rajinikanth's first appearance in a colour film. Since the actor was not fluent in Tamil at the time, Bhagyaraj read him his lines and Rajinikanth repeated them until he mastered them. For the role of Mayil, Bharathiraja initially wanted a 16-year-old girl, but after meeting 14-year old Sridevi, offered her the role, which he said would be down-to-earth and de-glamourised; to his surprise, Sridevi readily accepted. Bharathiraja said Sridevi's eyes had the "dreamy sparkle" that he envisioned the character Mayil with.

For the role of Mayil's mother Kuruvammal, Bharathiraja wanted someone who could speak the village dialect fluently and chose Gandhimathi for her acting style. Receiving a salary of ₹150, Bhagyaraj was initially considered for the veterinarian's role but declined as he wanted to concentrate on directing; despite that, he still made a cameo appearance in the film. The role of the veterinarian went to newcomer Shabbir Ahmed, who was given the screen name Sathyajith during post-production. His scenes were shot in ten days. Sathyajith was not well-versed in Tamil at the time of auditioning but dubbed in his own voice, even though Bharathiraja offered to have someone else dub for him. Haasan, Sridevi, Rajinikanth and Gandhimathi were credited by their character names in the opening credits, rather than their actual names.

=== Filming ===
Shot mainly in Mysore and Kollegal, 16 Vayathinile was the first Tamil film made predominantly outdoors and no sets were used. Due to budgetary constraints the crew could not afford a camera which could film slow motion and Sridevi had to run in slow motion for the song "Chendoora Poove". For his character, Haasan grew his curly hair long and wore lungis and khadi high-buttoned shirts. Bharathiraja also recalled that he showed a "handsome Kamal Haasan in an ugly way" as he wanted to prove that characters need not always be attractive, and to break this stereotype in the film industry.

In 2017 at a SICA function, Haasan recalled that he and Bharathiraja desired to take the film's cinematography like Ryan's Daughter (1970), but they did not have the required budget. Bharathiraja wanted a speckled hen for a scene, but as Bhagyaraj could not find one, he coloured a white hen with ink. The scene where Mayil spits on Parattai required several takes before Rajinikanth insisted that Sridevi actually spit on him for real.

While Bharathiraja wanted the film to follow a linear narration, it was Bhagyaraj's idea to begin the film with a flashback sequence. After the film completed its shoot, it was screened at least 20 times for the distributors, and the narrative switched every time between the linear and non-linear versions. Eventually, Rajkannu himself released the film, with the flashback narrative. A sequence featuring faulty lip sync was retained in the final cut after going unnoticed.

== Themes ==
16 Vayathinile focuses on rural Tamil Nadu, and the vulnerabilities of Mayil. Film critic Naman Ramachandran compared Parattaiyan to Rajinikanth's character Kondaji from Katha Sangama (1975), stating, "Like in that film, Rajinikanth is a card-playing wastrel with henchmen in tow. Just like the Thimmaraya character in Katha Sangama runs errands for Kondaji, here Chappani/Gopalakrishnan performs services for [Parattaiyan], but the similarity ends there because Thimmaraya is evil and Chappani is good." He also described 16 Vayathinile as the first film when a villainous character played by Rajinikanth does not have a change of heart or get away without being punished: "Here he pays for his deeds with his life." Saraswathy Srinivas of Rediff.com called Parattaiyan an "extension" of Rajinikanth's negative character from Moondru Mudichu (1976), but said that "the villainy is more pronounced and transparent here."

Film scholar Swarnavel Eswaran Pillai noted that the film was marked by "ambiguous and dark protagonists, new subjectivity, [and] avoidance of clichéd and cathartic closures". Kumuthan Maderya, writing for Jump Cut, described 16 Vayathinile as a "neo-nativity" film — a story set in rural Tamil Nadu, valorising the rustic and foregrounding the lives of villagers. Ashis Nandy, in his 1998 book The Secret Politics of Our Desires, noted that doctors in Tamil films like 16 Vayathinile are always viewed with "a bit of suspicion" and remain complete outsiders "capable of seducing women and polluting the community".

== Music ==
The soundtrack album and background score for 16 Vayathinile were composed by Ilaiyaraaja with lyrics by Kannadasan, Gangai Amaran and Alangudi Somu. The soundtrack consisted of four songs, that blends folk and Western classical music, and released under the EMI Records label.

== Release ==
=== Theatrical ===
16 Vayathinile was released on 15 September 1977. Rajkannu released the film himself after no distributors were willing to buy it. Although written off by the media as an experimental film that would fail, it became a commercial success, running for over 175 days in theatres, and becoming a silver jubilee film. (Note: A silver jubilee film is one that completes a theatrical run of 175 days (25 weeks).) The film earned $1 million at the box office according to a 2010 estimate by the magazine South Scope, and Rajkannu went into hiding to avoid income-tax raids.

=== Critical reception ===
The film received critical acclaim, with praise for Bharathiraja's script, Ilaiyaraaja's music and the performances of Haasan, Sridevi and Rajinikanth. The Tamil magazine Ananda Vikatan, in its review dated 9 October 1977, gave the film 62.5 marks out of 100, their highest rating for a Tamil film. The reviewer praised the film for representing village life with realism, and for avoiding the cliché of (studio) court and police station in its climax, but criticised the error in focusing. After seeing the film, Rajinikanth's mentor, the director K. Balachander wrote in a letter of appreciation to Bharathiraja, "You have hit the bull's eye". The writer of a Film Focus article in Tribune stated in 1983, "[Kamal Haasan] by his youthfulness alone has many years ahead of him to adorn the Tamil and Hindu screens, and going by his brilliance in Pathinaru Vayathinile, could even, displace [Sivaji Ganesan] with the passage of time" The reviewer concluded by describing "Sendhoora Poove" as a "silver lined melody that paced the film and added to its brilliance. Do not miss it at any cost."

=== Accolades ===
At the 25th National Film Awards, S. Janaki won the National Film Award for Best Female Playback Singer. At the 6th Filmfare Awards South, Haasan won the Filmfare Award for Best Actor – Tamil, and Sridevi won the Special Commendation Award for Performance at the same ceremony. The film won four Tamil Nadu State Film Awards: Best Director, Best Actor (Haasan), Best Music Director (Ilaiyaraaja) and Best Female Playback Singer (Janaki). Rajinikanth won the Arima Sangam Award for Best Actor.

== Remakes ==
16 Vayathinile was remade in Telugu by K. Raghavendra Rao as Padaharella Vayasu (1978) and in Hindi by Bharathiraja as Solva Sawan (1979), with Sridevi reprising her role in both. It was also remade by M. Raj in Malay as Melati Putih (1984). In October 2009, actor Ganesh revealed that he and his wife bought the remake rights of 16 Vayathinile for Kannada.

== Legacy ==
"I am [Bharathiraja's] very first fan ... These are not empty words. Before 16 Vayathinile's release, when he showed me the film, I wrote him a letter of appreciation. That's why I say that I'm his first fan and proud to be so."

— Director K. Balachander, on Bharathiraja

16 Vayathinile is considered a cult film and a landmark in Tamil cinema, diverging from traditional Tamil films of the time. (Note: Tamil films were mostly made in studios in Chennai till then.) With Annakili (1976), the film was a trendsetter for realistic portrayals of rural life, and made superstars of Sridevi, Haasan, and Rajinikanth, as well as boosting Goundamani's popularity. Outdoor shooting of films slowly started to increase after the release of 16 Vayathinile, but also led to decline of films shot in studios. According to Naman Ramachandran and S. Shiva Kumar of The Hindu, Haasan's performance was considered a tour de force by critics since he was typecast as a romantic hero at that time. The dialogue "Idhu Eppadi Irukku?" (How’s this then?), spoken by Parattaiyan, became very popular; IANS and Rediff included it on their lists of lines popularised by Rajinikanth. Manisha Lakhe, writing for Forbes India, noted that 16 Vayathinile "paved the way for unkempt villains who had a singularly disgusting laugh." A digitally remastered version of the film was being planned for a late 2013 release; although its trailer was released in October that year, the version failed to see a theatrical release.

In July 2007, S. R. Ashok Kumar of The Hindu asked eight Tamil directors to list their all-time favourite Tamil films; seven–C. V. Sridhar, K. Balachander, Mahendran, K. Bhagyaraj, Mani Ratnam, K. S. Ravikumar and Ameer–named 16 Vayathinile. According to Ratnam, the film was "memorable for its script, high standard and realism." South Scope included Haasan's performance on its list of "Kamal's best performances" in July 2010. S. Shiva Kumar of The Hindu included the film on his December 2010 list of "Electrifying Rajinikanth-Kamal Haasan films" with Moondru Mudichu (1976), Avargal (1977) and Aval Appadithan (1978). In April 2013 News18 included the film on its list of "100 greatest Indian films of all time", saying that it was a "decisive move away from the studio-bound productions and paved the way for successful integration of subaltern themes and folk arts into mainstream commercial cinema." In August 2015, News18 included the film in its list of "10 performances that make [Sridevi] the 'Last Empress' of Indian cinema". In November the same year, Daily News and Analysis included the film in its list of "Films you must watch to grasp the breadth of Kamal Haasan's repertoire".

In Bharathiraja's second directorial venture Kizhakke Pogum Rail (1978), a character named "Mayil" and her husband "Chappani" are mentioned, which journalists interpreted as the 16 Vayathinile characters, making this the first attempt in Tamil cinema to launch a shared universe. 16 Vayathinile was spoofed in Murattu Kaalai (2012) by Vivek, whose character Saroja is called "Mayil" by Cell Murugan's character (a veterinarian similar to Sathyajith's character in the film). In Sivaji: The Boss (2007), Vivek's character delivers one of Rajinikanth's catchphrases and concludes with "Idhu eppadi irukku?" (transl. How’s this then?). The film's title and characters have inspired other film titles such as Parattai Engira Azhagu Sundaram (2007), Mayilu (2012) and 36 Vayadhinile (2015). 16 Vayathinile was also used as the title of Bharathiraja's son Manoj's debut studio album.

== Bibliography ==
- Khorana, Sukhmani (2013). Crossover Cinema: Cross-Cultural Film from Production to Reception. Routledge. ISBN 978-0-415-63092-4.
- Nandy, Ashis (1998). The Secret Politics of Our Desires: Innocence, Culpability and Indian Popular Cinema. Palgrave Macmillan. ISBN 1-85649-516-7.
- Nayak, Satyarth (2019). Sridevi: The Eternal Screen Goddess. India: Penguin Random House. ISBN 9789353056780.
- Rajadhyaksha, Ashish; Willemen, Paul (1998) [1994]. Encyclopaedia of Indian Cinema. British Film Institute and Oxford University Press. ISBN 0-19-563579-5.
- Ramachandran, Naman (2014) [2012]. Rajinikanth: The Definitive Biography (2nd ed.). Penguin Books. ISBN 978-81-8475-796-5.
- Swaminathan, Roopa (2003). Kamalahasan, the consummate actor. Rupa & Co. ISBN 9788129103031.
