= Bala Bharatam =

- Theatrical release poster
- Directed by: Kamalakara Kameshwara Rao
- Written by: Samudrala Jr.
- Produced by: Mahija Prakasa Rao
- Starring: S. V. Ranga Rao; Anjali Devi; Baby Sridevi; S. Varalakshmi; Haranath; Master Prabhakar; Mikkilineni; Dhulipala; Kanta Rao
- Music by: Saluri Rajeshwara Rao
- Release date: 7 December 1972
- Country: India
- Language: Telugu

Bala Bharatam is a 1972 Indian Telugu-language Hindu mythological film in which most of the characters are played by children, including a 9-year-old Sridevi and Master Prabhakar.

The plot is the from the Mahabharata's story of Pandavas and Kauravas during their childhoods.

== Cast ==
- Baby Sridevi as Dussala
- Anjali Devi as Kunti
- Kanta Rao as Pandu Raju
- S. V. Ranga Rao as Bhishma
- Master Prabhakar as Duryodhana
- Dhulipala as Sakhuni
- Mikkilineni as Dhritarashtra
- S. Varalakshmi as Gandhari
- Haranath as Narada
- M. Balayya as Mahendra
- Rajanala as Yama Dharma Raja
- Rao Gopal Rao as Pataala Loka Adhipati
- Sivakumar as Vishnu
- Chandrakala as Madri
- Kaikala Satyanarayana as Kamsa
- Nagayya as Sandeepani Maharshi
- C. H. Narayana Rao as Drona
- Malladi as Kripacharya
- Thyagaraju as Drupada
- P. J. Sarma as Brihaspathi
- Aka V Subbarao as Thatha aryaka
- Master Visweswara Rao

== Soundtrack ==
- "Aadenoi Nagakanyaka Choodaloi Veerabalaka" –
- "Bhale Bhale Bhale Bhale Pedabava" –
- "Maanavude Mahaneeyudu Shaktiyutudu Yuktiparudu" –
- "Narayana Nee Leela Navarasabharitam" –
- "Taarangam Taarangam Taandavakrishna Taarangam" –
- "Vindu Bhojanam Pasandu Bhojanam" –
