= Solva Sawan =

1979 Indian romantic drama film

- Promotional poster
- Directed by: Bharathirajaa
- Written by: Bharathirajaa
- Produced by: A. S. R. Anjaneyulu
- Starring: Amol Palekar; Sridevi
- Cinematography: P. S. Nivas
- Edited by: K. Gopala Rao; K. Venkateswara Rao
- Music by: Jaidev
- Distributed by: Chaitanya Films
- Release date: 28 March 1979
- Running time: 140 minutes
- Country: India
- Language: Hindi

Solva Sawan (lit. 'Sixteenth Spring') is a 1979 Indian Hindi-language romantic drama film directed by Bharathirajaa. The film stars Amol Palekar and Sridevi, with Dina Pathak and Kulbhushan Kharbanda in supporting roles. It is a remake of Bharathiraja's own Tamil film 16 Vayathinile (1977), which also starred Sridevi. The film marked Sridevi's debut as a leading actress in Hindi cinema following an already successful and established career in South Indian cinema. She was 15 years old during the making of the film. Unlike the original, the film was a critical and commercial failure.

== Plot ==
Mehna is a 16-year-old girl filled with ambitions of becoming a teacher. She is an intelligent woman living in a small community and experiences great love when sees the new vet who has come to visit. Many are impressed by this charming young fellow who has entered the village. He seems to be a wealthy, prosperous man and soon develops a relationship with Mehna. Mehna, who is deep in love, sacrifices her opportunity to study in the teaching college course to spend time with him. Little does she know that he has not yet revealed his true colours when he leaves her and retires from the village when she refuses to commit to him.

Mehna's distant cousin is intellectually disabled, and because he is lame, he is taken advantage of and isolated by the society. He is secretly in love with Mehna, and when he sees her in love with the vet, he is jealous and upset. After being shunned by the vet, Mehna has a new perspective on life and begins to accept Palekar's character, encouraging him to defend himself against those who constantly mock him. When a rowdy villager attempts to rape Mehna, Mehna's cousin kills him by throwing a brick at his head. The cousin is arrested for murder, and the film concludes with Mehna waiting at a train station for his return.

== Cast ==
- Amol Palekar as Mehna's Cousin
- Sridevi as Mehna
- Kulbhushan Kharbanda as Rowdy Villager
- Madhukar
- Dina Pathak
- Adil Amaan

== Production ==
Kamal Hassan, who felt that 16 Vayathinile (1977) deserved a Hindi remake, told Amol Palekar, that only he could do justice to the film. Palekar saw 16 Vayathinile and was insistent that Sridevi reprise her role in Solva Sawan, so he approached her at her residence. She was initially skeptical to act in the film.

== Soundtrack ==
The music was composed by Jaidev, and lyrics were written by Naqsh Lyallpuri.

Track listing
No.	Title	Singer(s)	Length
1.	"Bua Bakri Layi Haandi"	Anuradha Paudwal, K. J. Yesudas	5:19
2.	"Goriya Ho Goriya"	K. J. Yesudas, Vani Jairam	5:31
3.	"Sarra Rara Rara Dhol Kahin Par Baaj"	Vani Jairam	6:26
4.	"Pi Kaha"	Vani Jairam	6:02
Total length:			23:18
