= Poompatta (film) =

1971 Indian Malayalam film directed by BK Pottekkad

- Poster
- Directed by: B. K. Pottekkad
- Screenplay by: B. K. Pottekkad
- Story by: Karoor Neelakanta Pillai
- Produced by: V. M. Sreenivasan
- Starring: Sridevi; Prema; Sankaradi; T. R. Omana
- Cinematography: N. Karthikeyan
- Edited by: N. R. Natarajan
- Music by: G. Devarajan
- Production company: Ambili Films
- Release date: 12 March 1971
- Country: India
- Language: Malayalam

Poompatta (transl. Butterfly) is a 1971 Indian Malayalam-language children's film, directed by B. K. Pottekkad (in his debut) and produced by V. M. Sreenivasan. Based on a short story by Karoor Neelakanta Pillai, the film stars Sridevi, Prema, Sankaradi and T. R. Omana. It was released on 12 March 1971. Sridevi won the Kerala State Film Award for Best Child Artist for her performance in this film.

== Plot ==
Sarada becomes an orphan after her mother dies due to an illness. She is raised by her stepmother, who ill-treats her.

== Cast ==
- Sridevi as Sarada
- Prema as Janaki
- Sankaradi as Astrologer
- Paul Vengola
- Nellikode Bhaskaran
- Ragini

== Soundtrack ==
The music was composed by G. Devarajan with lyrics by Yusufali Kechery.

| Song | Singers |
|---|---|
| "Arimullachedi" | Renuka |
| "Manathaarileppozhum" | P. Leela, Renuka |
| "Paadunna Painkilikku" | K. J. Yesudas |
| "Shibiyennu Peray" | P. Madhuri |
