= Padaharella Vayasu =

- Directed by: K. Raghavendra Rao
- Written by: Satyanand (dialogues)
- Story by: Bharathiraja
- Based on: 16 Vayathinile (Tamil)
- Produced by: Angara Sathyam
- Starring: Chandra Mohan; Mohan Babu; Sridevi; Nirmalamma
- Cinematography: K. S. Prakash
- Music by: K. Chakravarthy
- Release date: 31 August 1978
- Running time: 140 minutes
- Country: India
- Language: Telugu

Padaharella Vayasu (transl. 16 years of age) is a 1978 Indian Telugu-language romantic drama film starring Chandra Mohan, Sridevi and Mohan Babu. Directed by K. Raghavendra Rao, it is a remake of the Tamil film 16 Vayathinile (1977), which also starred Sridevi. Like the original, the film was a success, completing 100 days in almost every theatre it was shown in.

== Plot ==
This film revolves around a 16-year-old girl, Malli. She is a recent high school graduate (10th pass) with exceptional scores. She is an attractive, intelligent woman living in a small society, filled with ambitions of becoming a teacher. A new veterinarian arrives at the village hospital. Many are impressed by this charming young fellow; he seems to be wealthy and prosperous. Malli is deeply attracted to the doctor, and he, too, in turn seems to reciprocate her feelings. Malli sacrifices her opportunity to study in the teaching college course to spend time with him. But she sees his true colors when he tries to force himself on her. Malli refuses his advances. The doctor dumps her, insulting her by calling her an ignorant villager, and leaves the village.

Malli's mother also passes away after finding out about her daughter's affair and her failure to get any match arranged for Malli. Her only remaining family is her distant cousin Gopalakrishna, a village simpleton who is taken advantage of and isolated by society. He is secretly in love with Malli and is jealous and upset about the veterinarian. Another important character is the village rowdy Simhachalam, who also has an eye on Malli. With no other hope, Malli gets support from Gopal and turns him into a good person, and gradually falls in love with him. Malli asks Gopal to make arrangements for their marriage. Gopal goes to town. Meanwhile, Simhachalam attempts to rape Malli, but Gopal arrives on time and kills Simhachalam. He is sentenced to jail for the murder, and Malli waits for him. In the end, it is shown that Gopal gets released from jail and marries Malli.

== Cast ==
- Chandramohan as Gopal
- Sridevi as Malli
- Mohan Babu as Simhachalam
- Nirmalamma as Gangamma
- Navakanth as the doctor

== Production ==
Producer Midde Rama Rao bought the remake rights of Tamil film 16 Vayathinile at the cost of ₹1.25 lakh (equivalent to ₹34 lakh or US$36,000 in 2023). Sobhan Babu showed interest in the character, but the character was ultimately played by Chandra Mohan. Rajinikanth expressed interest in reprising his role from the original, but Mohan Babu was selected as he was better known in Telugu cinema. Sridevi reprised her role from the original after attempts to sign Jayasudha were unsuccessful. Navakanth portrayed the role of doctor. The film's composer, Chakravarthy, dubbed his voice for him. The film features a different climax from the original.

The film was completed in four months. Overall, with all expenses for rights and remunerations, the film cost makers ₹10.5 lakh (equivalent to ₹2.9 crore or US$300,000 in 2023), and they got a table profit of ₹6 lakh (equivalent to ₹1.6 crore or US$170,000 in 2023). The film celebrated a hundred-day run in almost all centers where it was released.

== Soundtrack ==
The music, largely Carnatic, was composed by K. Chakravarthy. Although Chakravarthi is the music director, the main song "Sirimallepoovaa Sirimallepoovaa" tune was originally composed by Ilaiyaraja in the Tamil version.

Song	Singer
"Sirimallepoovaa Sirimallepoovaa"	S. Janaki
"Sirimallepoovaa Sirimallepoovaa-2"	S. Janaki
"Puvvulaanti Malli Pushpinchenamma"	Chorus
"Vayasanta Mudupugatti Vastantale Adukundaam"	S. Janaki
"Kattukathalu Nenu Cheppi Navviste"	S. P. Balasubrahmanyam, S. Janaki
"Pantachelo Paalakanki Navvindi"	S. P. Balasubrahmanyam, S. Janaki
