= Sridevi =

Indian actress (1963–2018)

- Sridevi in 2014
- Born: Shree Amma Yanger Ayyapan; 13 August 1963; Meenampatti, Madras, India
- Died: 24 February 2018 (aged 54); Dubai, United Arab Emirates
- Occupation: Actress
- Years active: 1967–2018
- Works: Full list
- Spouse: Boney Kapoor (m. 1996)
- Children: Janhvi Kapoor; Khushi Kapoor
- Family: Surinder Kapoor family
- Honours: Padma Shri (2013)

Sridevi Kapoor (née Shree Amma Yanger Ayyapan; 13 August 1963 – 24 February 2018), known mononymously as Sridevi, was an Indian actress who worked in Telugu, Tamil, Hindi, Malayalam, and Kannada language films. Cited as the "first female superstar" of Indian cinema, she was the recipient of various accolades, including a National Film Award, Seven Filmfare Awards (a Filmfare Lifetime Achievement Award, Three Filmfare Awards, Three Filmfare Awards South), Tamil Nadu State Film Awards, a Kerala State Film Award, and a Nandi Award. Sridevi's career spanned over 50 years in a wide range of genres. She was known for her reticent and introverted off-screen personality, but headstrong and outspoken on-screen persona, often playing strong-willed women. In 2013, Sridevi was honoured with the Padma Shri, the country's fourth highest civilian honour.

Sridevi made her debut as a child in the 1967 Tamil film Kandhan Karunai at the age of four, and began playing lead roles as a child in M. A. Thirumugam's 1969 mythological Tamil film Thunaivan. Her first role as an on-screen adult came in 1976 at age 13, in the Tamil film Moondru Mudichu. She soon established herself as a leading female star of South Indian Cinema, with roles in such films as 16 Vayathinile (1977), Sigappu Rojakkal (1978), Padaharella Vayasu (1978), Varumayin Niram Sivappu (1980), Meendum Kokila (1981), Premabhishekam (1981), Vazhvey Maayam (1982), Moondram Pirai (1982), Aakhari Poratam (1988), Jagadeka Veerudu Athiloka Sundari (1990) and Kshana Kshanam (1991).

Sridevi's first starring role in Hindi cinema came with the drama film Solva Sawan (1979), and she received wider recognition for the action film Himmatwala (1983). She emerged a leading Hindi film star with several successes, including Mawaali (1983), Justice Chaudhury (1983), Tohfa (1984), Maqsad (1984), Karma (1986), Mr. India (1987), Waqt Ki Awaz (1988) and Chandni (1989). She received praise for her performances in Sadma (1983), Nagina (1986), ChaalBaaz (1989), Lamhe (1991), Khuda Gawah (1992), Gumrah (1993), Laadla (1994), and Judaai (1997). Following a hiatus, she played the title role in the television sitcom Malini Iyer (2004–2005). Sridevi returned to film acting with the comedy-drama English Vinglish (2012) and had her 300th and final film role in the crime thriller Mom (2017). She earned acclaim for both performances, and for the latter was posthumously awarded the National Film Award for Best Actress.

On 24 February 2018, she was found dead in her guest room at the Jumeirah Emirates Towers Hotel in Dubai, United Arab Emirates, with the cause cited as accidental drowning. News of her death featured prominently in Indian and international media. She was married to film producer Boney Kapoor, with whom she had two daughters, actresses Janhvi and Khushi Kapoor.

== Life and career ==
=== 1963–1975: Early years and work ===
Sridevi was born as Shree Amma Yanger Ayyapan on 13 August 1963 in Meenampatti village near Sivakasi, Tamil Nadu, India to Ayyapan and Rajeswari. Her father was a lawyer from Sivakasi while her mother was from Tirupati, Andhra Pradesh. Sridevi's native language was Telugu, and she was fluent in Tamil. She has a sister and two step-brothers.

"I lost out on going to school and college life, but I got into the film industry and worked without a gap – from child actor, I went straight to heroine. There was no time to think and I was grateful for it."

— Sridevi, The New Indian Express, 2013

Sridevi started her career as a child actor at the age of four in the Tamil movie Kandhan Karunai in 1967. Subsequently, she played the role of young Muruga in Thunaivan, which was her first breakthrough as child artist. Actress Sowcar Janaki opined that her "sharp features, sparkling eyes and innocent smile would be more than a handful for the role." Sridevi made her debut in Telugu cinema as a child artist with the 1970 film Maa Nanna Nirdoshi. Baby Sridevi's performance in Poompatta (1971) in Malayalam won her the Kerala State Film Award for Best Child Artist. Kandhan Karunai (1967), Nam Naadu (1969), Prarthanai (1970), Babu (1971), Badi Panthulu (1972), Bala Bharatam (1972), Vasantha Maaligai (1972) and Bhakta Kumbara (1974) are the most notable films of her career as a child artist. In 1972, Sridevi debuted as a child artist in Bollywood with Rani Mera Naam directed by K. S. R. Das. She also appeared in the film Julie, where she played the younger sister to the protagonist Lakshmi. She acted with Jayalalithaa in Thirumangalyam, Kandan Karunai and Aathi Parasakthi.

=== 1976–1982: Success in South India ===
Sridevi's lead roles in Telugu include Padaharella Vayasu, Konda Veeti Simham, Vetagaadu, Sardar Paparayudu and Bobbili Puli. With Akkineni Nageswara Rao, she appeared in movies such as Premabhishekham, Bangaru Kanuka and Prema Kanuka as well as with Krishna in Kalavari Samsaram, Adavi Simhalu, Gharana Donga, Kirayi Kotigadu, Pachani Kapuram, and Ram Robert Rahim. She acted with Chiranjeevi in Jagadeka Veerudu Athiloka Sundari, S. P. Parasuram. She acted with Nagarjuna in Aakhari Poratam (1988), and Govinda Govinda (1993). Her performance in the 1992 Ram Gopal Varma directed Kshana Kshanam won her the Filmfare Award for Best Actress – Telugu and the Nandi Award for Best Actress. Sridevi has acted in a total of 95 Telugu language films.

In 1976, Sridevi landed her first leading role in the Tamil film Moondru Mudichu directed by K. Balachander. She followed it with a number of films with Kamal Haasan and Rajinikanth. Sridevi's first release of 1977 was Gaayathri, followed by Kavikkuyil and 16 Vayathinile, where she played the role of a young girl who is caught between her 2 lovers. She also starred in the film's Telugu remake Padaharella Vayasu in 1978. Her subsequent notable films included Bharathi Raja's Sigappu Rojakkal, S. P. Muthuraman's Priya, Karthika Deepam, Johnny, Varumayin Niram Sivappu and Aakali Rajyam. She acted with N. T. Rama Rao in Vetagaadu, Sardar Papa Rayudu, Bobbili Puli, Justice Chowdhary and Aatagadu. She acted alongside Sivaji Ganesan in Sandhippu, Kavari Maan and the Sri Lanka-filmed coproduction Pilot Premnath.

Sridevi debuted as child artist in Kannada with Bhakta Kumbara (1974) directed by Hunsur Krishnamurthy. Her other films as a child artist in Kannada included Bala Bharatam and Yashoda Krishna. She was also a part of Hennu Samsarada Kannu (1975), directed by A. V. Seshagiri Rao. Sridevi also acted as lead opposite Ambareesh in Priya (1978), produced by S. P. Muthuraman. She entered Malayalam films as a child actor with Kumara Sambhavam in 1969, followed by I. V. Sasi's Abhinandanam. Her notable Malayalam films as the lead heroine were Thulavarsham, directed by N. Sankaran Nair in 1976, and M. Masthan's Kuttavum Shikshayum, a remake of the Tamil film Pennai Nambungal with Kamal Haasan starring opposite her.

She next appeared in the Malayalam releases like Aa Nimisham, Angeekaaram and Satyavan Savithri directed by P.G. Viswambharan. In 1981, she starred in the Tamil film Meendum Kokila which won her the Filmfare Award for Best Actress – Tamil. In 1982, Sridevi starred in Moondram Pirai playing a woman suffering from retrograde amnesia and went on to win the Tamil Nadu State Film Award for Best Actress. She was paired with Kamal Haasan in 27 films across languages.

=== 1983–1986: Hindi film debut and success ===
Sridevi made her debut as a heroine in Hindi films in Solva Sawan in 1979. 4 years later, she was signed to star opposite Jeetendra in Himmatwala (remake of Telugu film Ooruki Monagadu (1981)). The film released in 1983, and was one of the highest-grossing Hindi films of the year. It established Sridevi in Bollywood. Her dance number "Nainon Mein Sapna" became a rage with Rediff stating that "the water pots may have dominated most frames in 'Nainon Mein Sapna', but it was Sridevi's bejewelled outfits and headgears that stole the show". She followed with Tohfa, which was the highest-grossing Hindi film of 1984. The film established Sridevi as one of the leading actresses of Bollywood, with Filmfare magazine declaring her "Unquestionably #1" on their cover.

The pair of Jeetendra-Sridevi did 16 films together of which Himmatwala (1983), Jaani Dost (1983), Justice Chaudhry (1983), Mawaali (1983), Akalmand (1984), Tohfa (1984), Balidaan (1985), Aulad (1987), Suhaagan (1986), Ghar Sansar (1986), Dharm Adhikari (1986), Sone Pe Suhaaga (1988) were successful, and Aag Aur Shola (1986), Himmat Aur Mehanat (1987), Sarfarosh (1985) were flops.

However, it was Sadma (1983) which brought Sridevi widespread critical acclaim. A remake of her Tamil film Moondram Pirai, Sadma is included in iDiva's list of '10 Must Watch Movies That Weren't Blockbusters'. Sridevi's performance as a child-woman suffering from amnesia was called by Indian Express "a milestone in her illustrious career". Sridevi also featured in the Mid-Day's list of 'Challenging Roles played by Bollywood Actors' describing her act in the film as "her best performance ever". In 2012, Adil Hussain, Sridevi's co-star in English Vinglish revealed that he became a fan of the actress after watching her in Sadma. The Sridevi-Kamal Hassan pair also appeared on the CNN-IBN 2012 list of 'Greatest Romantic Couples on Celluloid'. The film earned Sridevi her first Filmfare nomination for Best Actress.

Sridevi had successful pairing with Rajesh Khanna in films such as Naya Kadam (1984), Maqsad (1984), Masterji (1985) and Nazrana (1987). In 1986, came the snake fantasy Nagina which saw Sridevi play a shape-shifting woman. The film turned out to be the second highest-grossing film of the year, with Box Office India stating that Sridevi remained "the undisputed #1". It was also named one of the best snake fantasy films by Yahoo. Times of India ranked Nagina as one of the 'Top 10 Snake Films of Hindi Cinema'. Sridevi's climax dance number "Main Teri Dushman" also remains one of the best snake dances in Bollywood, with Desi Hits calling it "one of Sridevi's most iconic dance numbers... that still gives fans goose bumps" and iDiva describing it as "the stuff of movie legends". Nagina is credited as being the film which established Sridevi's position as the biggest female star of the 1980s, rivalling male stars like Amitabh Bachchan and Dharmendra. Besides Nagina, 1986 also saw Sridevi giving box-office hits in Subhash Ghai's multi-starrer Karma and Feroz Khan's Janbaaz. According to CNN-IBN's Bollywood Blockbusters, "Sridevi's popularity grew so much that despite having a guest appearance in Janbaaz, she completely overshadowed the film's lead heroine Dimple Kapadia."

=== 1987–1991: Stardom ===
Sridevi followed the success of Nagina by playing a goofy crime journalist in the science fiction film Mr. India (1987) opposite Anil Kapoor, which was described by Rediff as "one of the most iconic films of its time". Directed by Shekhar Kapur, it became one of the highest grossing hits of the year and also found a place in Hindustan Times' list of 'Top 10 Patriotic Films of Hindi Cinema'. While the trade famously joked that the film should have been named Ms. India, Rediff also stated that "Sridevi was a complete show-stealer in the film". Sridevi's imitation of Charlie Chaplin in the film was described by The Times of India as "the most hilarious act she has ever done". Rediff also featured Sridevi in its list of 'Super 6 Comic Heroines' stating that "her mobile face expressions could give Jim Carrey sleepless nights" and that "her biggest plus point is her ability to be completely uninhibited in front of the camera".

The dance number "Hawaa Hawaai", cited by The Times of India as "one of the unforgettable numbers of Sridevi", also became a popular nickname for the actress. Besides comedy, Sridevi featured in the video for the song "Kaate Nahin Kat Te"; Filmfare described Sridevi as "truly a goddess in a blue sari". Rediff also featured the song in its list of 'Top 25 Sari Moments' praising Sridevi's "ability to look erotic even when she's covered from head-to-toe". For Mr. India, Sridevi commanded ₹1.1 million, making her the highest paid Indian actress. Box Office India states that with the success of Mr. India, Sridevi "continued her domination" over her contemporaries Jaya Prada and Meenakshi Sheshadri.

1989 saw the release of the Yash Chopra's romantic musical saga Chandni, with Sridevi playing the title role. The film emerged as one of the biggest blockbusters of 1989. Cited by The Times of India as "one of the most watched films of Indian cinema", the film also reaffirmed Sridevi's position as the top female star of the 1980s. She was also paid ₹1.5 million for the lead role. While she topped the Hindustan Times' list of Yash Chopra's 'Top 5 Heroines', CNN-IBN also ranked her first on a similar list, saying "Yash Chopra immortalized Sridevi as the perfect Chandni". India Today and NDTV also included her in such lists, stating that the film established Sridevi "as the nation's sweetheart". The Tribune wrote: "Leena Daru scored a winner again when she created the 'Chandni Look' for Sridevi. Every street corner sold the salwar-kameez and dupatta that gave the heroine a refreshingly understated look, rarely seen on the Indian screen", Sridevi's dance number "Mere Haathon Mein Nau Nau Choodiyaan" proved also popular with audiences, and she also lent her voice to the film's popular title-track.

The same year, Sridevi also starred in the slapstick comedy ChaalBaaz, which had her play a double role of twin sisters separated at birth. Filmfare ranked her performance #4 in its list of '80 Iconic Performances of Hindi Cinema', stating that "Sridevi's penchant for giggles and her ability to look distinctly tearful when required polishes these performances to perfection. Hell, she made Sunny Deol and Rajinikanth look like sidekicks in the film". The Times of India article 'Bollywood's Hit Double Roles' wrote, "Sridevi's performance had rocked the box office". Rediff featured the film in its countdown of "25 Best Double Roles in Bollywood" saying "What you don't realise until you have seen Chaalbaaz is just how incredible Sridevi is at depicting both ends of the spectrum", and that the film "cemented her position as an actress with a killer comic timing". Speaking to The Indian Express about Sridevi's act in ChaalBaaz, the director Pankaj Parashar said "She proved her range with the movie and after that she got lots of offers which saw her in a double role". Her slapstick rain dance "Na Jaane Kahaan Se Aayi Hai" became successful with The Times of India describing it as "a Sridevi classic where she simply looked wow with her chirpy expressions and rain drops kissing her cheeks." Sridevi garnered Best Actress nominations at Filmfare for both Chandni and ChaalBaaz in 1989, winning for the latter.

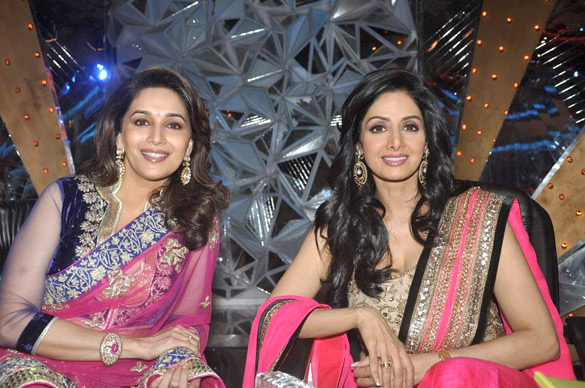
Sridevi (right) with actress Madhuri Dixit on season 5 of Jhalak Dikhhla Jaa (2012)

Chopra then cast Sridevi in his 1991 intergenerational musical romantic drama Lamhe. The Times of India included it in its list of 'Top 10 Films of Yash Chopra' describing it as a tale of "love transcending the boundaries of time and space" while Rediff called it "Quite easily one of his most definitive films, Chopra surpassed his own findings of romance with the insightful, lovely Lamhe." Sridevi played both the roles of mother and daughter in what iDiva described as "another double role but it was unlike any played before." Hailed by Rediff as "one of the most remarkable films of her career... often considered a film way ahead of its time", Sridevi's folk dance number 'Morni Baga Ma' also became a rage and was placed among the 'Top 5 Songs' of Yash Chopra by Hindustan Times. Lamhe was an underwhelming success at the box-office, but received widespread critical acclaim and has become a cult classic over the years. Talking about the film, critic Rachel Dwyer wrote in her biography of the film-maker "Chopra's own favourite film, Lamhe (Moments (1991)), divided the audience on a class basis: it was hugely popular with metropolitan elites and the overseas market, which allowed it to break even, but it had a poor box-office response (largely lower-class, especially the repeat audience) because of its supposed incest theme". The Hindu reported that "With shades of incest, Lamhe caused more than a flutter and remained the talk of the town", while Sridevi herself admitted in an interview with Rajeev Masand that she found the subject "too bold". Though the film flopped at the box-office, with Rediff describing its failure as "one of those bizarre, unexplained moments of cinema", Lamhe picked up 5 Filmfare trophies including Best Film and a second Best Actress trophy for Sridevi. Her popular Rajasthani costumes in the film also won designer Neeta Lulla her first National Film Award for Best Costume Design.

=== 1992–1997: Continued success ===
In 1992, Sridevi starred in the epic drama Khuda Gawah opposite Amitabh Bachchan. The actress played a double role again as an Afghan warrior Benazir and her daughter Mehndi. Shot mostly in Mazar-i-Sharif, Afghanistan, it did good business with BBC reporting that "it ran to packed houses for 10 weeks in Kabul". Khuda Gawah still remains popular in Afghanistan and Rediff reported that the film is "in great demand after the reopening of cinema halls in the country" in 2001. For Khuda Gawah, Sridevi earned ₹2.5 million for the role. At Filmfare, the film picked up the Best Director trophy, while Sridevi earned a nomination for Best Actress. During the production of Jurassic Park in 1992–93, acclaimed Hollywood director and producer Steven Spielberg approached Sridevi for a small role in the film. However, Sridevi, after evaluating the stature of the role, refused the offer.

Sridevi's big-budget 1993 release Roop Ki Rani Choron Ka Raja was one of India's most expensive films ever made. Though the film failed at the box office, Sridevi was appreciated with Times of India calling her disguise in a comedy scene "the best ever South Indian role played by any actress". She next starred in the 1993 thriller Gumrah, opposite Sanjay Dutt. Directed by Mahesh Bhatt, the actress played a singer falsely accused of drugs smuggling in Hong Kong. Bollyspice stated in its 'Sridevi Retrospective' that "Despite great performances from the rest of the cast, Gumrah was really Sridevi's film. She managed to exemplify female emotion and robustness to a great degree that you remember the film largely for her significant contribution towards it," Her performance earned her another nomination for Best Actress at Filmfare.

In 1994, Sridevi teamed up with Anil Kapoor again in Laadla playing business tycoon Sheetal Jaitley. The character, described by Times of India as "rude, dominant and very competitive" brought her yet another Best Actress nomination at Filmfare. She acted in her comeback film in Malayalam in 1996 – Bharathan's Devaraagam, a love story in which she starred opposite Aravind Swamy.

The last major film Sridevi starred in before she took a break from the industry was the romantic drama Judaai, released in 1997. Along with Anil Kapoor and Urmila Matondkar, the actress played a greedy housewife going to extreme lengths for money. Talking about her swan-song, critic Subhash K. Jha wrote that Sridevi "left us with the most stunning hurrah in Judaai. A terrible film that I've watched countless times to see her play the money-minded harridan who 'sells' her husband to Urmila Matondkar. Who but Sridevi could carry of such an outrageous role with such enthusiastic élan?!" while Bollyspice stated that "She used her polished acting skills to illustrate her character's greed and individualism at such a grotesque level." Judaai earned Sridevi her eighth Best Actress nomination at Filmfare. In 1996, Sridevi married Boney Kapoor of the famed Bollywood royalty, the Kapoor family. During the years 1996–97, her mother was suffering from brain cancer-induced complications. After her mother's death in 1997, Sridevi went on a hiatus from the film industry.

=== 2004–2018: Comeback, television debut and final roles ===
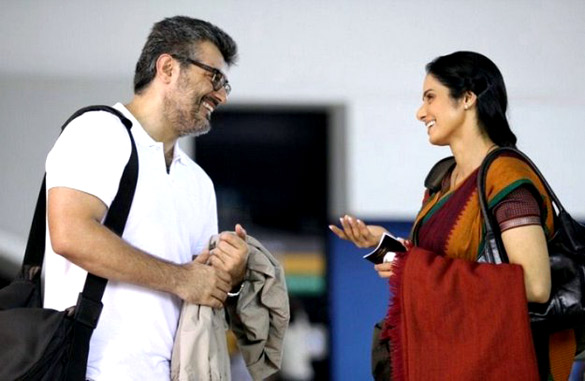
Sridevi with Ajith Kumar on the sets of film English Vinglish in 2012

After a 6-year hiatus, Sridevi briefly returned to the small screen in the Sahara sitcom Malini Iyer (2004–2005). She also appeared on Jeena Isi Ka Naam Hai (2004) and as a judge in the TV show Kaboom (2005). She performed a medley of some of her musical numbers at the 52nd Filmfare Awards in 2007. She was also a member of the board of directors at the Asian Academy of Film & Television.

On 19 September 2009, Sridevi appeared on the Sony TV show 10 Ka Dum. On 13 May 2012, Sridevi appeared on the Star Plus talk-show Satyamev Jayate.

Sridevi had also developed a passion for painting. In March 2010, her paintings were sold by an international art auction house with the money raised being donated.

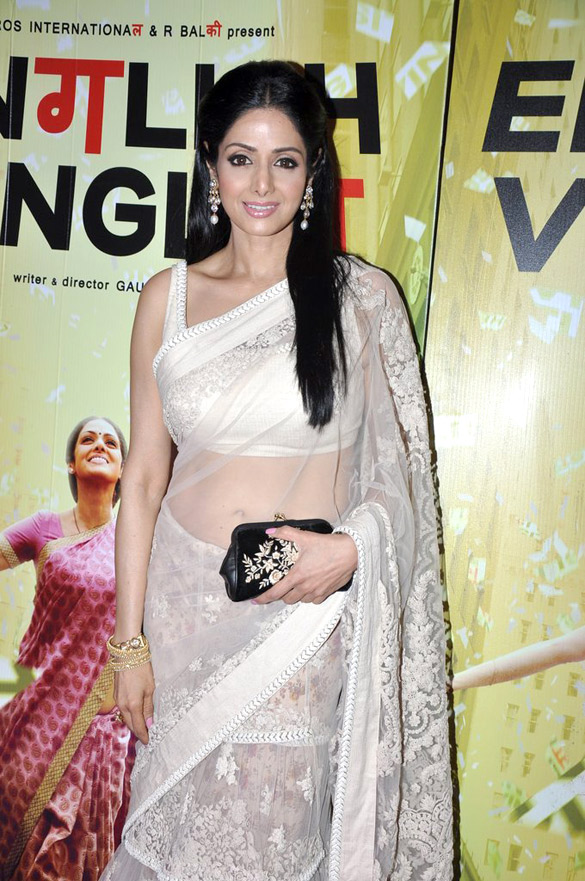
Sridevi at the premiere of English Vinglish in 2012

After a 15-year absence from film, Sridevi starred in English Vinglish (2012), a comedy-drama helmed by debutante director Gauri Shinde. In the film, she played Shashi Godbole, a housewife who enrolls in an English-speaking course after her husband and daughter's mocking of her English skills. The film and Sridevi's performance received widespread critical acclaim. The Times of India called it "easily one of the best films of 2012!" and Sridevi's performance "a masterclass for actors." Raja Sen of Rediff found the film "a winner all the way [...] Sridevi excels in fleshing out her character", and critic Subhash K. Jha said Sridevi "makes the contemporary actresses, even the coolest ones, look like jokes... If you watch only 2 films every year make sure you see English Vinglish twice!" Rajeev Masand of CNN-IBN wrote Sridevi delivers "a performance that is nothing short of perfect [...] It's warm and fuzzy, and leaves you with a big smile on your face." "Sridevi doesn't miss a beat. Her performance is a triumph!", added the critic Anupama Chopra. Komal Nahta said she "makes the best comeback in Bollywood history and delivers a landmark performance."

With the high critical acclaim and massive commercial success of English Vinglish, Sridevi became the only actress in Bollywood to make a successful comeback as a leading lady after marriage and a long hiatus. Gauri Shinde featured her in the Financial Times 2012 list of '25 Indians To Watch'. She topped Rediff.com's annual listing of the "Bollywood's Best Actresses" in 2012; the website wrote English Vinglish "is a simple film where things are credible, never melodramatic" and Sridevi "always judges the tone right. It's the sort of performance younger actresses should learn from." Sridevi was declared the most-admired Bollywood actress of 2012 in a mobile survey conducted by Vuclip, the world's largest mobile research company. She was nominated for several awards, including her ninth nomination for Best Actress at Filmfare. Following an appearance during the song "Apna Bombay Talkies" in the film Bombay Talkies (2013), Sridevi starred in the Tamil fantasy action adventure film Puli (2015), which became her last Tamil film before her death in 2018.

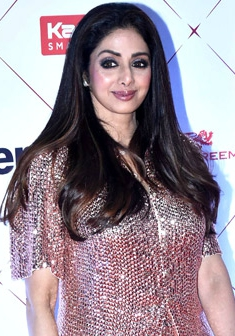
Sridevi at the HT Style Awards in January 2018

Sridevi was next seen in her home production titled Mom (2017), which marked her 300th film. In the psychological thriller film, she played a mother who sets out to avenge the rape of her daughter. Sridevi said that as a mother and an artiste, she empathised with her character's rage, and found it hard to be in a normal state during the filming. Mom was released on 7 July 2017 to highly positive reviews, with critics widely appreciating Sridevi's performance. The Times of India and The Indian Express added Sridevi "demonstrates why she is the high-priestess of Indian cinema" and that she "needs only a twitch or a glance to prove that she is a powerhouse and there are several scenes she lifts by just being there." For her performance, Sridevi received the National Film Award for Best Actress and earned nominations for Best Actress and Best Actress (Critics) at Filmfare and the Screen Award for Best Actress. At the time of her death, Sridevi was not shooting for any upcoming films and her last on-screen appearance was in Aanand L. Rai's film Zero (2018) in a cameo. Sridevi had signed the 2019 period romantic drama Kalank, produced by Karan Johar; however, due to her demise she was replaced by Madhuri Dixit. Another film she had signed, was to play a cameo role in the Malayalam film Sree Sree Devaraagam, a sequel to Sridevi's own 1996 film Devaraagam, was subsequently shelved after her death in 2018.

== Personal life ==
Sridevi was always accompanied by her mother Rajeswari or by her sister Srilatha to the film sets during shooting of her films between 1972 and 1994. The politician Sanjay Ramasamy has been married to her sister Srilatha since 1989.

Sridevi campaigned for her father when he contested the Sivakasi constituency in 1989 assembly elections, but eventually lost in the elections. Her father died in 1990 of heart attack, while she was shooting for Lamhe. Her mother died in 1996, as a result of the complications suffered from an operation that she underwent in 1995 on a brain tumour at Memorial Sloan Kettering Cancer Center in New York. The neurosurgeon operated on the wrong side of her brain destroying her vital tissues of vision and recent memory. This was widely reported in US media at that time which then led to a successful court battle and prompted then President Bill Clinton's proposal of a program for hospitals to disclose their medical errors.

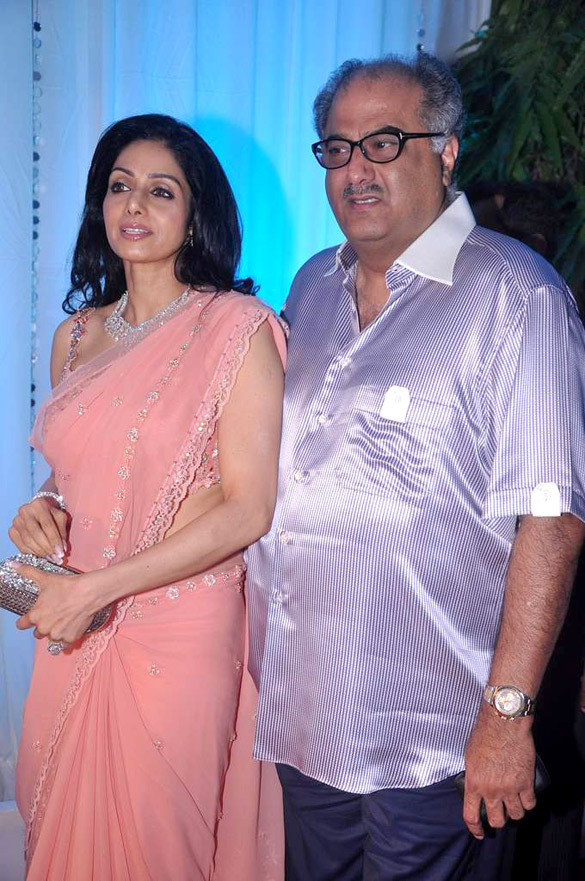
Sridevi with her husband Boney Kapoor at Esha Deol's wedding reception in 2011

Sridevi was extremely discreet about her privacy and rarely gave interviews or discussed her private life in them. In 1996, she married producer Boney Kapoor. Their children are Janhvi (born 1997), and Khushi (born 2000), both film actresses.

Despite being known for her portrayals of a strong, vivacious and exuberant woman on-screen, Sridevi was an extremely introverted and reserved person off-screen. CNN-IBN correspondent Rajeev Masand says; "I have never known anyone who was so painfully shy, so quiet off-screen, who just transformed into a force of nature when the cameras came on. She was an interviewer's nightmare, but the movie-buff's dream". Commenting on her reserved nature, Firstpost says; "Behind the glamorous heroine with twinkling, magical eyes and a stunning face, was an inherently shy woman, often mistaken as arrogant. The truth is she was shy. Having begun to act when she was just 4, she did not complete formal education or get much of a chance to interact with kids of her own age. Consequently, she developed a strong dislike for crowds and noise."

Boney Kapoor shared that Sridevi didn't speak to him for six months after he proposed, as he was married with two kids at the time. Despite the initial rejection, he eventually convinced her, and they married soon after.

== Death and funeral ==
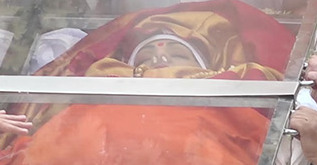
Mortal remains of Sridevi lying in a casket during funeral procession in February 2018

On 20 February 2018, Sridevi and her younger daughter Khushi had flown to Al Jazirah Al Hamra in Ras Al Khaimah, United Arab Emirates, to attend the wedding of her husband's nephew Mohit Marwah. She decided to spend a couple of days in Dubai to shop for her elder daughter Janhvi's 21st birthday, after the wedding. Her husband Boney Kapoor was not present with them on the wedding day, as he had to attend a meeting in Lucknow on 22 February. However, he had already planned a surprise visit to his wife, with whom he spoke on the morning of 24 February, when she told him that "Papa (that's how Sridevi addressed Boney), I'm missing you." According to Boney, he took a 15:30 flight to Dubai and reached Jumeirah Emirates Towers Hotel around 18:20 in Room 2201 where Sridevi was staying. She and Boney briefly met, chatted for 30 minutes or so and decided to have dinner. Sridevi went to bathe and get dressed for dinner, while Boney waited in the living room. After 15–20 minutes, around 19:00, he called out to her as they were getting late but did not get a response.

Sridevi was pronounced dead on 24 February 2018 at 19:00 GMT in her hotel room where her husband had found her. At first, it was announced by her brother in-law Sanjay Kapoor to the Indian media that the cause of death was a cardiac arrest, but an investigation into her death began early Sunday morning around 2:30, and the case was transferred to Dubai Public Prosecution by Dubai Police, where General Department of Forensic Evidence, Dubai revealed that the cause of death was "accidental drowning". The toxicology report later also revealed that traces of alcohol were found in her body, and water was found in her lungs.

After rumours that news of her death was an Internet hoax, Sanjay Kapoor confirmed her death. Her fans, co-stars and other Bollywood stars posted condolences on Twitter to mourn the death. After a few days of police investigation, on 27 February, Sridevi's case was closed, and on the night of that day, her body was flown back to Mumbai, India. Ashraf Thamarassery helped bring back her body to India by her husband and her stepson, Arjun Kapoor, on a private jet belonging to Anil Ambani. Her funeral took place on 28 February, at the Vile Parle Seva Samaj Crematorium in Mumbai. The final rites were performed by her husband Boney Kapoor. Sridevi was cremated with state honours and also received a gun salute at her funeral. Her pyre was lit by her husband. On 3 March, Sridevi's ashes were flown into Tamil Nadu via Chennai by her husband and her two daughters Janhvi Kapoor and Khushi Kapoor and later taken to and immersed in the sea off the coast of Rameswaram.

=== Tributes and reactions ===
The film industry, friends, and fans responded to her death through social and other media outlets. Her husband, Boney Kapoor, wrote: "To the world, she was their Chandni, the actor par excellence, their Sridevi, but to me, she was my love, my friend, mother to our girls, my partner. To our daughters, she was their everything, their life. She was the axis around which our family ran." The Prime Minister of India, Narendra Modi lamented the death of Sridevi. On social media, he stated: "Saddened by the untimely demise of noted actor Sridevi. She was a veteran of the film industry, whose long career included diverse roles and memorable performances. My thoughts are with her family and admirers in this hour of grief. May her soul rest in peace." President Ram Nath Kovind wrote: "Shocked to hear of passing of movie star Sridevi. She has left millions of fans heartbroken. Her performances in films such as Moondram Pirai, Lamhe and English Vinglish remain an inspiration for other actors. My condolences to her family and close associates."

Many from the film community and Sridevi's close relatives paid homage to her at Celebration Sports Club in Lokhandwala and at her funeral. Thousands of fans took to streets to pay their respects. Police had to resort to lathi-charge to control the fans who gathered for the procession from Celebration Sports Complex to the crematorium. The crowd was said to number more than 7,000.

Sridevi's funeral is estimated to have attracted the fourth-highest number of mourners, ranking below the three previous biggest funeral processions of non-political film personalities Kishore Kumar, Mohammed Rafi and Rajesh Khanna in India from the Hindi film industry.

== Legacy and influence ==
Sridevi is highly regarded for her range as an actor, critics have commended, particularly her comedic abilities and her skills as a dancer. During the 1980s, Sridevi was the highest-earning woman in the Indian entertainment industry. For her role in Mr. India (1987), she was paid a then-unprecedented ₹11 lakhs (equivalent to ₹150 lakhs in 2026; ~US$1,820,000 in 2025), making her the highest-paid Indian actress ever when adjusted for inflation. In a 2013 national poll conducted by CNN-IBN on the occasion of the centenary of Indian cinema, Sridevi was voted "India's Greatest Actress in 100 Years", and she placed #10 in a UK poll, "100 Greatest Bollywood Stars", in the same year. In 2012, Sridevi was placed at No. 2 by NDTV in the listing of "The most popular Bollywood actresses of all time". Sridevi featured in Box Office India's Top Actresses list from 1983 to 1993 and topped of the list five times (1987 to 1991).

An epitaph in Firstpost pointed out that Sridevi had been sufficiently important as an actor to be able to refuse parts in movies, and The News Minute called her "a pathbreaker in many ways". The Guardian called her "the undisputed queen of Indian Cinema".

"If Sridevi had no other identity beyond the films that she did, the audiences probably have no concept of films in India without her. Irrespective of the era you were born in or the actors you liked, the cosmos of Hindi film fans is divided into two distinctive groups of those like Sridevi and the others. Unlike most other iconic stars that, in a way, took over from their predecessors, Sridevi never really replaced anyone and perhaps it is this aspect that makes her unique and peerless."

— Firstpost on the influence of Sridevi.

Film critic Sukanya Verma described Sridevi as "one-of-a-kind". She wrote, "Sridevi's biggest plus point is her ability to be completely uninhibited in front of the camera." Sridevi is cited by media publications as a fashion icon. Her taste in clothes was varied and ranged from stylish casual to opulently majestic. She made her debut as a fashion model in 2008. The actress modelled clothes for designers Priya and Chintan at the Lakme Fashion Week. The next year, she displayed the work of jewellery designer Queenie Dhodhy at the HDIL India Couture Week. She worked at Lakme Fashion Week again in 2010, and at Delhi Couture Week 2012, showing clothes designed by Sabyasachi Mukherjee.

She has also appeared on the cover of several fashion magazines. In 2007, she was featured on the cover of Hi Blitz with the tagline "The Goddess Returns". In 2011, she featured on the cover of Marie Claire, and in 2012, she was on the cover of L'Officiel. In 2013, Sridevi appeared on the cover of Vogue, which was mentioned in Hindustan Times, The Times of India, and India Today.

Sridevi received the 'Ultimate Diva' award at the Ciroc Filmfare Glamour & Style Awards in 2015.

Sridevi's performances, acting style and technique have been influential and have inspired numerous actresses including Divya Bharti, Juhi Chawla, Karisma Kapoor, Kajol, Rani Mukerji, Preity Zinta, Kareena Kapoor Khan, Priyanka Chopra Jonas, Katrina Kaif, Vidya Balan, Anushka Shetty, Deepika Padukone, Alia Bhatt, and Soumitrisha Kundu, who have cited her as an inspiration. In a piece for Time magazine, Priyanka Chopra wrote, "Everyone wanted her and wanted to be like her. She could be childlike, grown-up, funny, serious, beguiling, sexy—she was the ultimate actor. [...] She was my childhood, and one of the big reasons I became an actor."

Sridevi is one of the very few actors who was praised by her veterans, peers and the next generation actors alike. Senior actress Jamuna called Sridevi "an icon of South Indian film industry". Actor Salman Khan mentioned that the actress was "bigger than Khans, Kapoors and Kumars". Commenting on her acting style, actor Shah Rukh Khan noted that she was a "complete artiste", and that "he had learnt a lot from her". "You know she has this whole process of being able to see herself while she is performing", he said.

In the Telugu biopic NTR: Kathanayakudu, Sridevi was portrayed by Rakul Preet Singh.

In a highly exceptional move, the actress became one of the few people from the Indian entertainment industry to be accorded with full state honours usually reserved only for current and former prime ministers, union and state ministers. Sridevi was included in 2018 In Memoriam section during the 90th Academy Awards ceremony. On the occasion of Sridevi's birthday on 13 August 2019, Madame Tussauds Singapore has announced that a wax statue would soon be dedicated to her. The statue is a replica of Sridevi's look in the iconic song, "Hawaa Hawaai" from Mr. India. Her daughters, Janhvi Kapoor and Khushi Kapoor were present at the ceremony accompanied by her husband, producer Boney Kapoor.

In 2018, author and journalist Lalita Iyer wrote a biography on her. In 2019, author and screenwriter Satyarth Nayak wrote a biography of Sridevi. The book, Sridevi: The Eternal Screen Goddess, was published by Penguin Random House. It received positive reviews in The Times of India and The Hindu, and was also reviewed in India Today, The Week, Mid-Day, Vogue India, and Firstpost.

== Awards and honours ==
Year	Notable work	Award	Category	Result	Ref.
1971	Poombatta	Kerala State Film Awards	Best Child Artist	Won	
1976	Moondru Mudichu	Filmfare Awards South	Best Actress – Tamil	Nominated	
1977	16 Vayathinile	Filmfare Awards South	Best Actress – Tamil	Nominated	
1977	16 Vayathinile	Filmfare Awards South	Special Award	Won	
1978	Sigappu Rojakkal	Filmfare Awards South	Best Actress – Tamil	Nominated	
1978	Padaharella Vayasu	Filmfare Awards South	Best Actress – Telugu	Nominated	
1979	Karthika Deepam	Filmfare Awards South	Best Actress – Telugu	Nominated	
1980	Varumayin Niram Sivappu	Filmfare Awards South	Best Actress – Tamil	Nominated	
1981	Moondram Pirai	Tamil Nadu State Film Awards	Best Actress	Won	
1981	Premabhishekam	Filmfare Awards South	Best Actress – Telugu	Nominated	
1982	Meendum Kokila	Filmfare Awards South	Best Actress – Tamil	Won	
1983	Moondram Pirai	Filmfare Awards South	Best Actress – Tamil	Nominated	
1984	Sadma	Filmfare Awards	Best Actress	Nominated	
1986	Nagina	Filmfare Awards	Special Award	Won	
1987	Mr. India	Filmfare Awards	Special Award	Won	
1988	Aakhari Poratam	Filmfare Awards South	Best Actress – Telugu	Nominated	
1990	ChaalBaaz	Filmfare Awards	Best Actress	Won	
1990	Chandni	Filmfare Awards	Best Actress	Nominated	
1990	Jagadeka Veerudu Athiloka Sundari	Filmfare Awards South	Best Actress – Telugu	Nominated	
1991	Kshana Kshanam	Filmfare Awards South	Best Actress – Telugu	Won	
1991	Kshana Kshanam	Nandi Awards	Best Actress	Won	
1992	Lamhe	Filmfare Awards	Best Actress	Won	
1993	Khuda Gawah	Filmfare Awards	Best Actress	Nominated	
1994	Gumrah	Filmfare Awards	Best Actress	Nominated	
1995	Laadla	Filmfare Awards	Best Actress	Nominated	
1998	Judaai	Filmfare Awards	Best Actress	Nominated	
1998	Judaai	Screen Awards	Best Actress	Nominated	
2013	English Vinglish	Filmfare Awards	Best Actress	Nominated	
2013	English Vinglish	Screen Awards	Best Actress	Nominated	
2013	English Vinglish	Zee Cine Awards	Best Actress (Jury's Choice)	Nominated	
2013	English Vinglish	Star Guild Awards	Best Actress	Nominated	
2013	English Vinglish	Star Guild Awards	President Honor	Won	
2013	English Vinglish	International Indian Film Academy Awards	Best Actress	Nominated	
2013	English Vinglish	BIG Star Entertainment Awards	Most Entertaining Actress in a Social – Drama Film	Won	
2013	English Vinglish	Stardust Awards	Best Actress – Drama	Won	
2013	English Vinglish	Hello Magazine Hall of Fame Awards	Outstanding Performance of the Year	Won	
2013	English Vinglish	NDTV Indian of the Year	Entertainer of the Year	Won	
2013	English Vinglish	IRDS	Best Performance	Won	
2013	English Vinglish	Jagran Film Festival	Best Actress	Won	
2018	Mom	Zee Cine Awards	Best Actress (Jury's Choice)	Won	
2018	Mom	Zee Cine Awards	Best Actress (Viewer's Choice)	Nominated	
2018	Mom	Screen Awards	Best Actress	Nominated	
2018	Mom	GQ Awards India	Excellence in Acting	Won	
2018	Mom	Lux Golden Rose Awards	Power Packed of the Year	Won	
2018	Mom	Masala! Awards Dubai	Outstanding Performance	Won	
2018	Mom	Filmfare Awards	Best Actress	Nominated	
2018	Mom	Filmfare Awards	Best Actress (Critics)	Nominated	
2018	Mom	Bollywood Film Journalists Awards	Best Actress	Won	
2018	Mom	National Film Awards	Best Actress	Won	
2018	Mom	International Indian Film Academy Awards	Best Actress	Won	
2018	—N/a	International Indian Film Academy Awards	Honorary Award	Honoured	
2019	—N/a	Filmfare Awards	Lifetime Achievement Award	Honoured	
2025	—	Filmfare Awards	Cine Icon Awards (1980s)	honoured	

=== Civilian awards ===
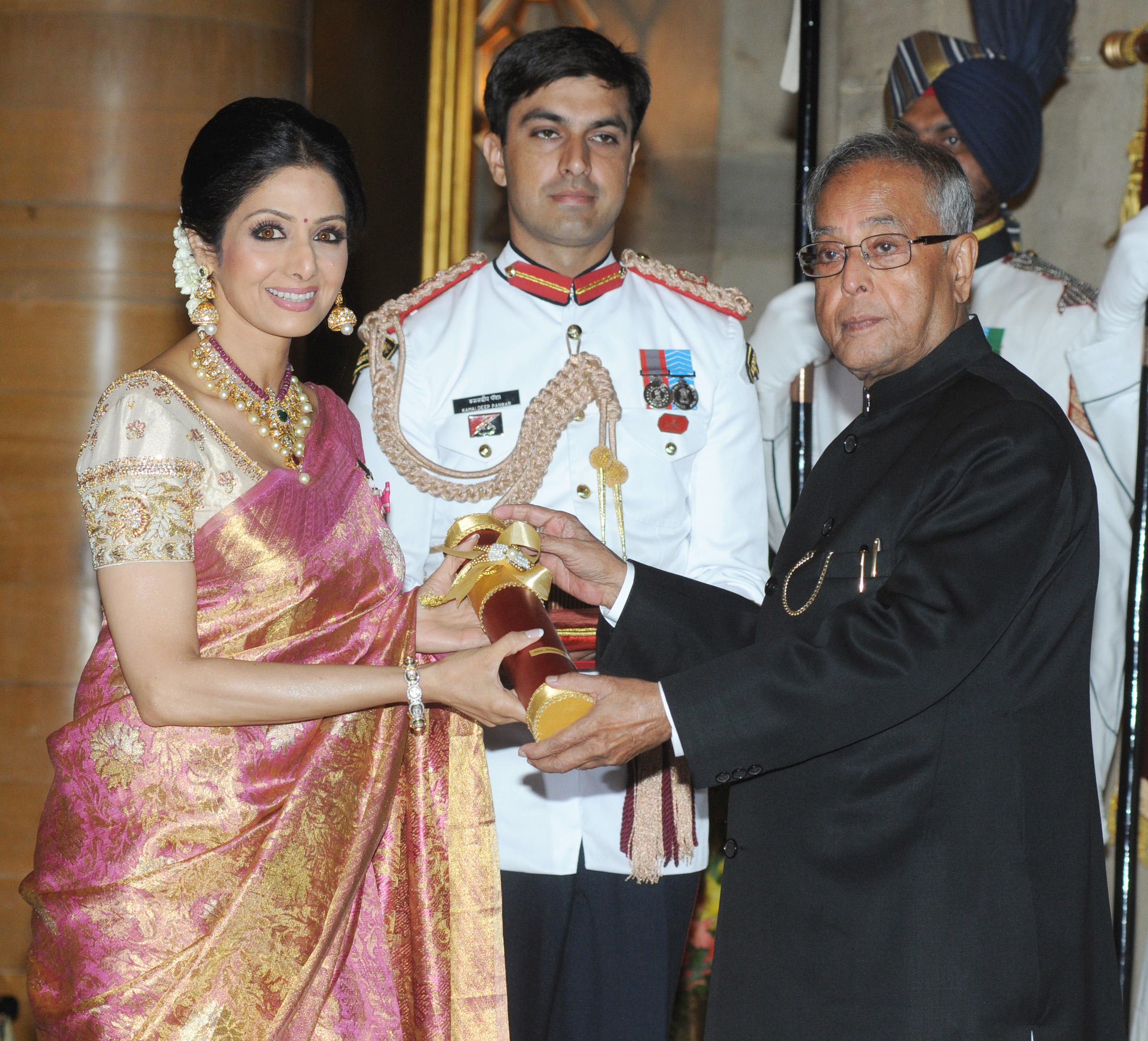
President Pranab Mukherjee presenting the Padma Shri award to Sridevi, at an investiture ceremony, at Rashtrapati Bhavan, in New Delhi on 5 April 2013

- 1991 – "Order of Afghanistan" for Khuda Gawah
- 2013 – Padma Shri – India's fourth-highest civilian award from the Government of India

=== Special honours ===
- 1990 – Smita Patil Memorial Award for her contribution to Indian Cinema
- 1997 – Kalasaraswathi Award by the government of Andhra Pradesh
- 2003 – Lachchu Maharaj Award
- 2003 – Vamsee International Award for her contribution in Indian Cinema
- 2003 – MAMI Award in Contribution to Indian Cinema
- 2008 – FICCI "Living Legend in Entertainment Award"
- 2009 – Special Honour at 33rd Cairo International Film Festival for Contribution to Hindi Cinema
- 2013 – Honoured by the government of Kerala for her contribution to Cinema
- 2013 – Ranked No. 4 among Bollywood's female actresses and was placed No. 10 in the overall list in a UK poll celebrating 100 years of Indian cinema '100 Greatest Bollywood Stars' published by British Asian weekly newspaper 'Eastern Eye'
- 2013 – Voted 'India's Greatest Actress of All Time' in CNN-IBN Poll
- 2013 – President of India 'Medallion of Honour' for contribution to 100 Years of Indian Cinema
- 2014 – Inspiring Icon Award from Sathyabama University, Chennai
- 2018 – Asian Award for Contribution to Cinema
- 2018 – 71st Cannes International Film Festival Titan Reginald F. Lewis Icon Award
- 2018 – Outstanding Achievement in Cinema at The Asian Awards
- 2019 – ANR National Award for 2018
- 2023 – Google Doodle released for her 60th birth anniversary
