= List of alumni of St. Stephen's College, Delhi =

An alumnus of St Stephen's College, Delhi is called a Stephanian. Alumni of the college include distinguished economists, CEOs of Fortune 500 companies, scientists, mathematicians, historians, writers, bureaucrats, journalists, lawyers, politicians including several Members of Parliament (MP) in India, as well as the Heads of State of four countries, and sportspersons including a number of olympians and international athletes. The names in this list are presented in alphabetical order of surname/family name. This is not an exhaustive list.

== Politicians ==
- Nuruddin Ahmed (1904–1975), barrister, three-time Mayor of Delhi and Padma Bhushan recipient
- Salim Ahmed Salim, former Prime Minister of Tanzania
- S. Jaishankar, IFS, former Foreign Secretary of India, current Minister of External Affairs of India
- Mani Shankar Aiyar, MP, former Cabinet Minister
- Ranjib Biswal, Member of Parliament, Rajya Sabha
- Amir Chand Bombwal, freedom fighter
- Prodyut Bora, BJP IT cell founder
- Brij Krishna Chandiwala, Indian freedom fighter and social worker; political associate of Mahatma Gandhi
- Swapan Dasgupta, former Rajya Sabha MP
- Lala Har Dayal, Indian nationalist revolutionary and freedom fighter
- Sandeep Dikshit, MP
- Jarbom Gamlin (1961–2014), former Chief Minister of Arunachal Pradesh
- Gopalkrishna Gandhi, IAS, former Governor of West Bengal
- Indrajit Gupta (1919–2001), Longest serving Lok Sabha MP (11 times) and former Home Minister of India
- Amit Jogi, member of Janta Congress Chhattisgarh
- Najeeb Jung, IAS, former Lieutenant Governor of Delhi.
- Salman Khurshid, former MP, External Affairs Minister, former Law Minister
- Sucheta Kripalani, former Chief Minister of Uttar Pradesh; India's first woman Chief Minister
- Ashwani Kumar, former Additional Solicitor General of India, Rajya Sabha MP
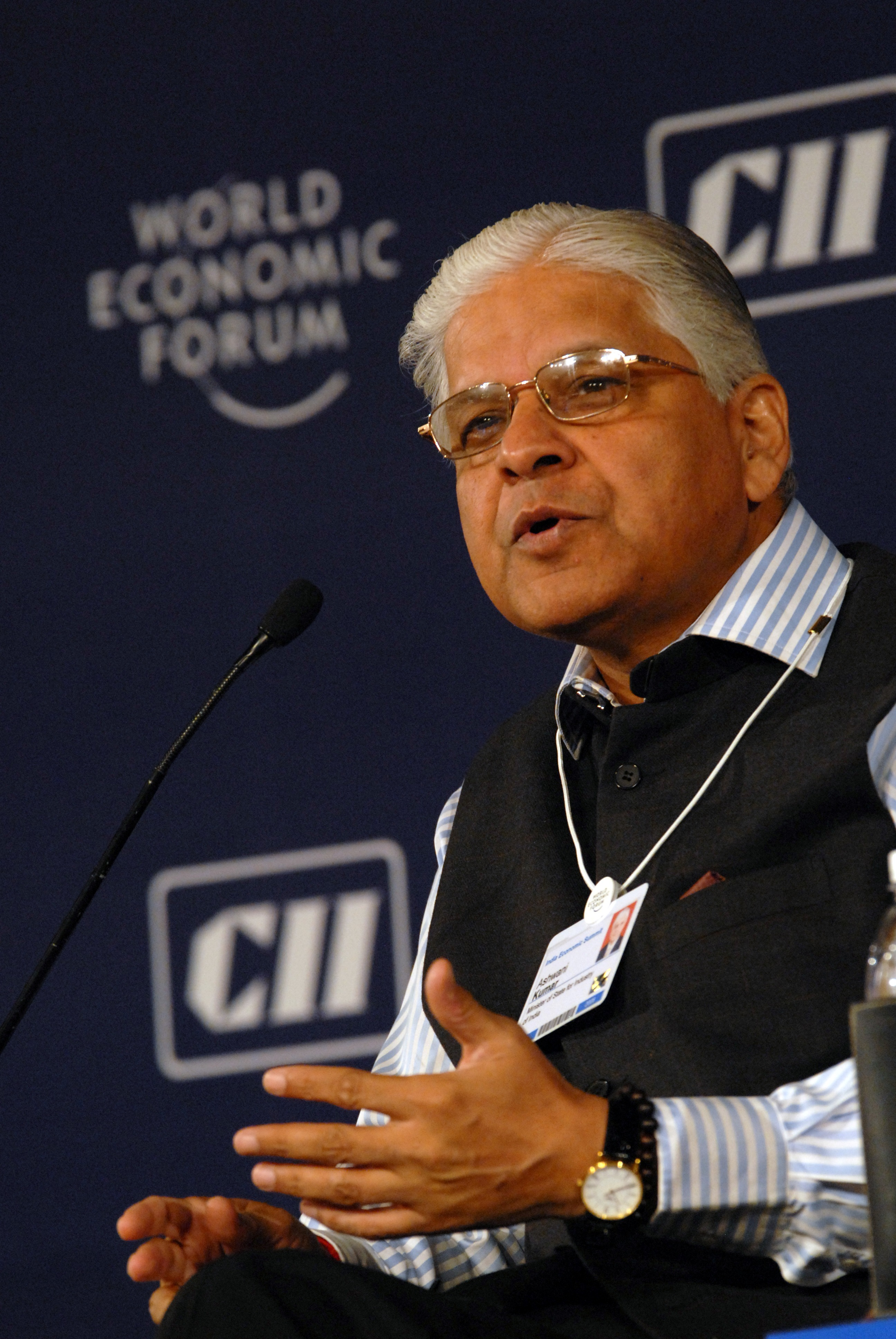
  Ashwani Kumar
- Atishi Marlena Singh, former Chief Minister of Delhi
- Chandan Mitra, former Rajya Sabha MP
- Sangay Ngedup, former Prime Minister of Bhutan
- Oommen Chandy, former MLA, former Chairman of the National Outreach Cell of Indian Youth Congress, former Chief Minister of Kerala
- Naveen Patnaik, former Chief Minister of Odisha
- Sachin Pilot, MLA, former Deputy Chief Minister of Rajasthan, former Union Minister
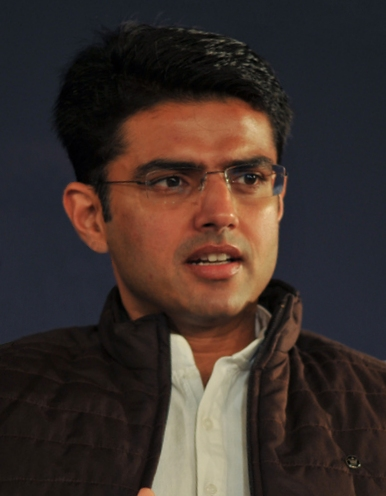
  Sachin Pilot
- Chhotu Ram (1881–1945), pre-partition politician, knighted in 1937
- Kapil Sibal, MP, former Law Minister of India
- Kalikesh Narayan Singh Deo, Lok Sabha MP, leader of the Biju Janata Dal
- Lakshman Singh, 5 term Member of Parliament
- Natwar Singh, MP, former Foreign Minister of India
- R.K. Singh, IAS, former Home Secretary to the Government of India, Minister of State (Independent Charge) for Power and Renewable Energy, Minister of State for Skill Development and Entrepreneurship
- Virbhadra Singh, former Chief Minister of Himachal Pradesh
- Vikramaditya Singh, Cabinet Minister of Himachal Pradesh Legislative Assembly
- Shashi Tharoor, MP, former Minister of State, former Under-Secretary-General of the UN

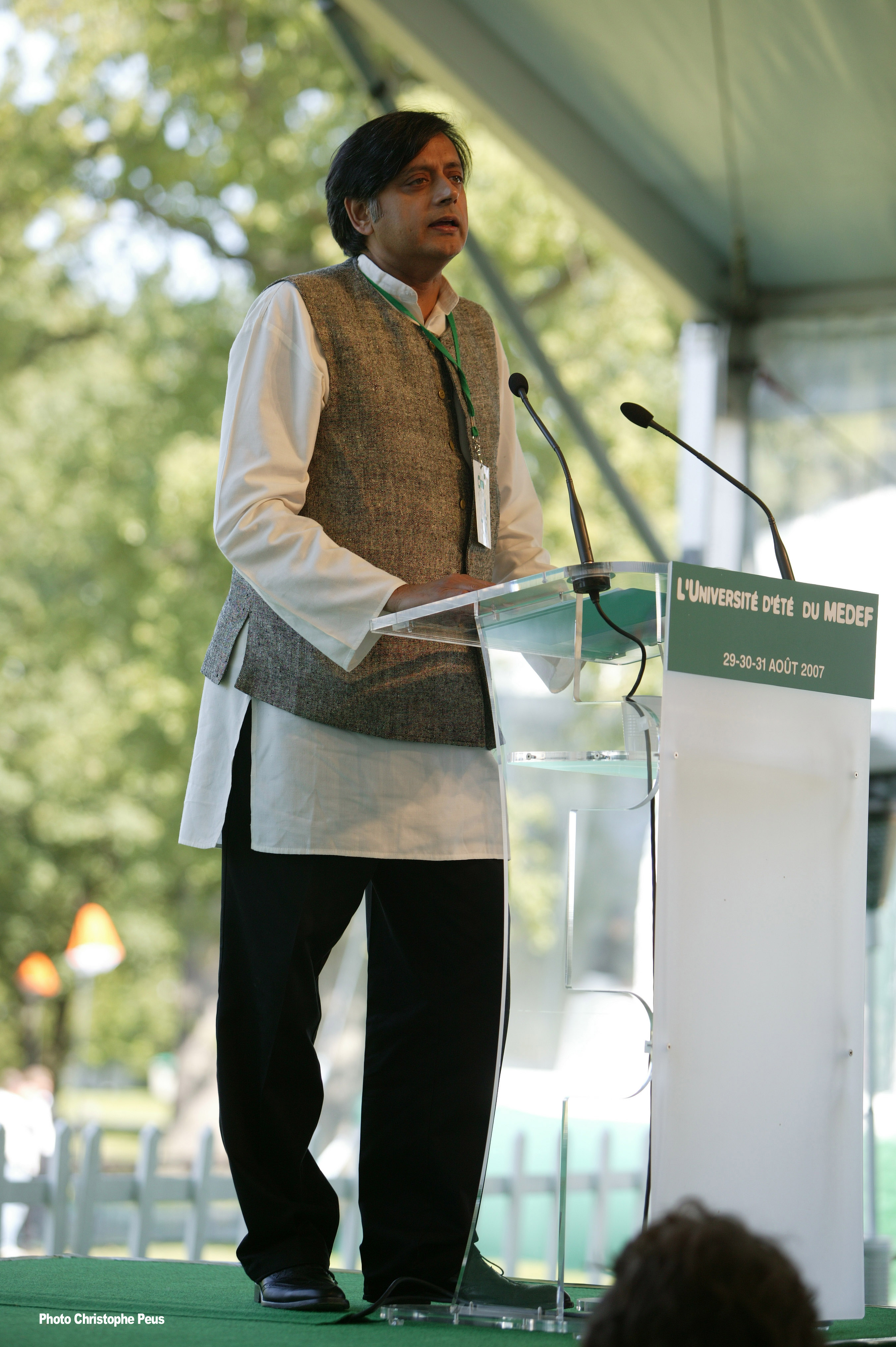
Shashi Tharoor

- Jigme Thinley, former Prime Minister of Bhutan
- Savita Vaidhyanathan, American politician; mayor of Cupertino, California
- Khandu Wangchuk, former Prime Minister of Bhutan
- Sitaram Yechuri, former General Secretary of Communist Party of India (Marxist)
- Bashir Hussain Zaidi, CIE, member of the first Lok Sabha; former Vice-Chancellor of Aligarh Muslim University
- Muhammad Zia-ul-Haq (1924–1988), former President of Pakistan

== Law ==
- Badar Durrez Ahmed, former Chief Justice (Acting) of the Delhi High Court
- Bishwajit Bhattacharyya, former Additional Solicitor General of India
- Dhananjaya Y. Chandrachud, 50th Chief Justice of India
- Ranjan Gogoi, 46th Chief Justice of India (2018–2019)
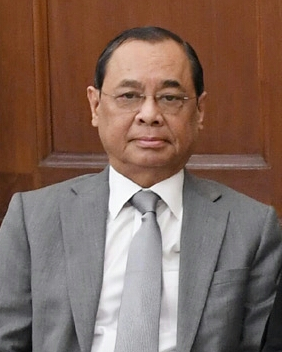
  Ranjan Gogoi
- Bhupinder Nath Kirpal, 31st Chief Justice of India
- Sanjay Kishan Kaul, Judge, Supreme Court of India
- Sanjiv Khanna, 51st Chief Justice of India, Supreme Court of India
- Hima Kohli, Judge, Supreme Court of India
- Madan Lokur, Judge, Supreme Court of India
- Karuna Nundy, lawyer, Supreme Court of India
- Vikramajit Sen, Judge, Supreme Court of India
- Abhishek Singhvi, Senior Advocate, Supreme Court of India; Rajya Sabha MP from West Bengal

== Bureaucrats ==
- Parag Jain, IPS, Secretary of Research & Analysis Wing External Intelligence Agency of India
- Montek Singh Ahluwalia, economist; Deputy Chairman of the Planning Commission; former Finance Secretary
- Pramod Chandra Mody (IRS), 13th Secretary General of the Rajya Sabha
- Javeed Ahmad, IPS, Director of National Institute of Criminology and Forensic Sciences, and former Director General of Uttar Pradesh Police
- Yamini Aiyar, Chief Executive and President of Centre for Policy Research
- Asaf Ali (1888–1953), Indian ambassador to the US, Governor of Odisha
- Pratyaya Amrit, IAS, Principal Secretary in Government of Bihar
- Jaimini Bhagwati, IFS officer and World bank economist
- Ajay Bisaria, IFS, High Commissioner of India to Canada
- M. N. Buch, IAS officer and urban planner, helped develop modern Bhopal”
- Pulok Chatterji, IAS, Principal Secretary to the Prime Minister of India (2011–2014)
- Navin Chawla, former chief election commissioner of India
- Shaktikanta Das, 25th Governor of the Reserve Bank of India
- Parvez Dewan, IAS officer
- Vijay Keshav Gokhale, 32nd Foreign Secretary of India
- Deepak Gupta, Chairman Union Public Service Commission
- Wajahat Habibullah, first Chief Information Commissioner of India
- Salman Haidar, IFS, Foreign Secretary of India
- Lieutenant General Syed Ata Hasnain, high-ranking officer of the Indian Army
- Gulrez Hoda, IAS officer
- Parameswaran Iyer, IAS, led Swachh Bharat Mission
- S. Jaishankar, IFS, Foreign Secretary of India, current External Affairs Minister of India
- Ajay Narayan Jha, former Finance Secretary and member of Fifteenth Finance Commission
- Ashok Kamte (1965–2008), officer of Indian Police Services, killed in action during 26/11 attack.
- Amitabh Kant, CEO of NITI Aayog (2016–incumbent)
- Vijayendra Nath Kaul, former Comptroller and Auditor General of India (2002–2008)
- Amit Khare, IAS, Principal Secretary (Finance), Government of Jharkhand
- Rahul Khullar, IAS Officer, former Chairman Telecom Regulatory Authority of India
- Neeraj Kumar, IPS, Former Delhi Police Commissioner
- VJ Kurian, Former managing director of Cochin International Airport and Addl. Chief Secretary Govt of Kerala
- Ved Marwah, officer of IPS
- Rajiv Mehrishi, IAS, Comptroller and Auditor General of India, former Home Secretary and Finance Secretary of India
- Shivshankar Menon, IFS, former National Security Adviser of India
- Vinay Mittal, Chairman Union Public Service Commission
- Monika Kapil Mohta, Ambassador of India to Switzerland
- Nirmal Kumar Mukarji, officer of ICS
- Anshu Prakash, IAS, former Chief Secretary of Delhi
- Vinay Sheel Oberoi, IAS officer
- Armstrong Pame, IAS officer
- S. Y. Quraishi, former Chief Election Commissioner of India
- MK Ranjitsinh, IAS, former Chairman of the Wildlife Trust of India
- Aftab Seth, eminent IFS officer
- Ajit Seth, 30th Cabinet Secretary of India
- Kamalesh Sharma, IFS, 5th Secretary General of the Commonwealth of Nations
- Harsh Vardhan Shringla, 33rd Foreign Secretary of India
- A P Singh, former director of CBI
- Alwyn Didar Singh, former secretary general of FCCCI
- N. K. Singh, chairman of Fifteenth Finance Commission of India
- Taranjit Singh Sandhu, IFS, current Indian Ambassador to the United States
- Pradeep Kumar Sinha, IAS, Cabinet Secretary of India
- Ravi Sinha, Director of the Research and Analysis Wing (RAW)
- Yashvardhan Kumar Sinha, former High Commissioner of India to the United Kingdom
- Rakesh Sood, eminent IFS officer
- Vikram Sood, former director of the Research and Analysis Wing (RAW)
- Prajapati Trivedi, economist and first Secretary, Performance Management Division, Cabinet Secretariat
- Alok Verma, Former Director of Central Bureau of Investigation
- Asim Arun Indian Police Service
- S. Krishnan, IAS, Secretary, Ministry of Electronics and Information Technology

Ajay Yadav, Indian Administrative Service, 2010 batch, Tamil Nadu cadre.

== Business ==
- Ashok Alexander, former director, McKinsey & Company & Head, Bill & Melinda Gates Foundation
- Rahul Bajaj, chairman, Bajaj Group
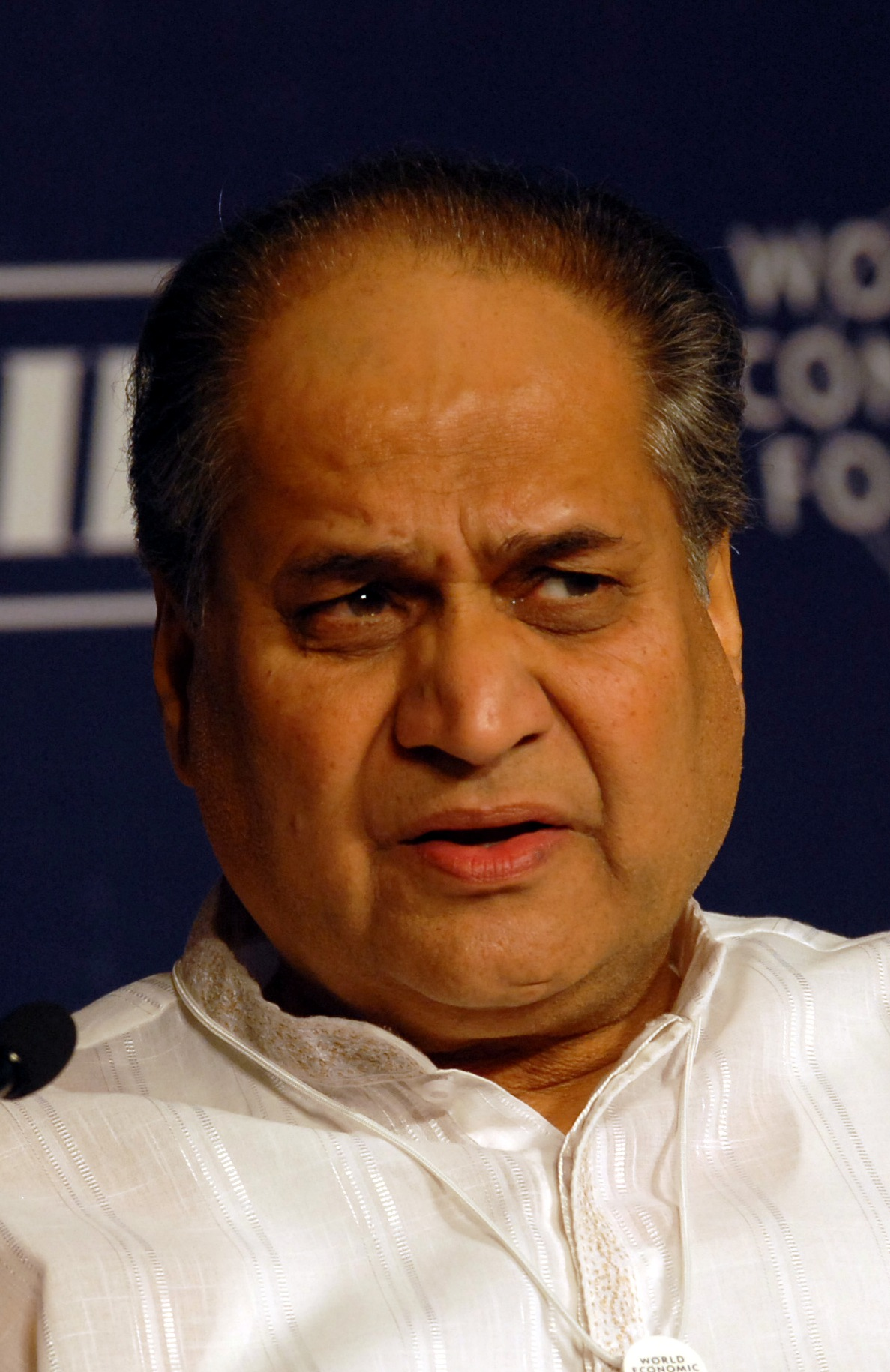
  Rahul Bajaj
- Ajaypal Singh Banga, former CEO of MasterCard
- Sarthak Behuria, former Chairman Indian Oil Corporation
- Sanjeev Bikhchandani, Internet entrepreneur, founder Info Edge, founder Ashoka University
- Sanjay Dalmia, Chairman Dalmia Group
- Dinesh Dayal, Chief Operating Officer at L'Oréal India
- Srini Gopalan, CEO of T-Mobile US
- Piyush Gupta, CEO, DBS Bank
- Deep Kalra, founder and CEO of MakeMyTrip
- Jagdish Khattar, IAS, former managing director, Maruti Suzuki
- Siddhartha Lal, CEO, Eicher Motors
- Arun Maira, former Chairman Boston Consulting Group
- Vikram Singh Mehta, former CEO of Shell India
- Ivan Menezes, CEO of Diageo
- Piyush Pandey, Executive Chairman and Creative Director, Ogilvy and Mather India and South Asia
- Vipul Ved Prakash, Internet entrepreneur and co-founder of Topsy and Cloudmark
- Deepak Puri, founder, chairman and managing director of Moser Baer
- Dev Sanyal, CEO of VARO Energy Group, Switzerland and former group executive committee member, bp plc, London
- Bharat Ram, industrialist, former chairman and Managing Director Delhi Cloth & General Mills
- Madan Mohan Sabharwal, business executive, social worker and Padma Shri awardee
- Malvinder Mohan Singh, co-founder, Fortis Healthcare
- Shivinder Mohan Singh, co-founder, Fortis Healthcare
- Janmejaya Sinha, Chairman Boston Consulting Group
- Vikram Talwar, Founder & CEO EXL Service
- Gautam Thapar, Chairman Avantha Group
- Ashok Vemuri, former CEO Conduent and iGATE

== Performing arts ==
- Niret Alva, television producer
- Siddhartha Basu, quiz master
- Kabir Bedi, actor
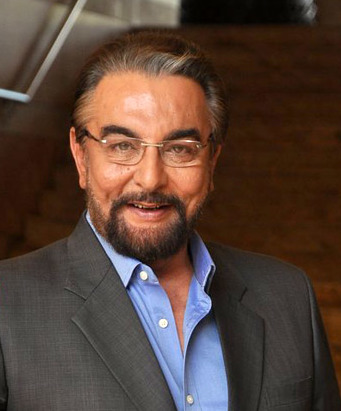
  Kabir Bedi
- Pankaj Butalia, documentary filmmaker
- Richa Chadha, actress
- Safdar Hashmi, founding member of Jana Natya Manch
- Shekhar Kapur, director and producer
- Amit Khanna, triple National Film Award winning producer, founder chairman of Reliance Entertainment
- Arunima Kumar, kuchipudi dancer
- Raam Reddy, director, Thithi
- Parikshit Sahni, actor
- Divya Seth, actor
- Roshan Seth, actor
- Rajeev Siddhartha, actor
- Chandrachur Singh, actor
- Konkana Sen Sharma, actor
- Suraj Sharma, actor

== Writers, poets, artists and critics ==
- Saeed Ahmad Akbarabadi (1908–1985), Indian Islamic scholar
- Upamanyu Chatterjee, IAS, author
- Kanika Dhillon, author and screenwriter
- Yashica Dutt, writer
- Mahmood Farooqui, prominent Urdu poet, performer and director
- Rajmohan Gandhi, biographer, recipient Sahitya Akademi Award
- Amitav Ghosh, author
- Ramachandra Guha, author
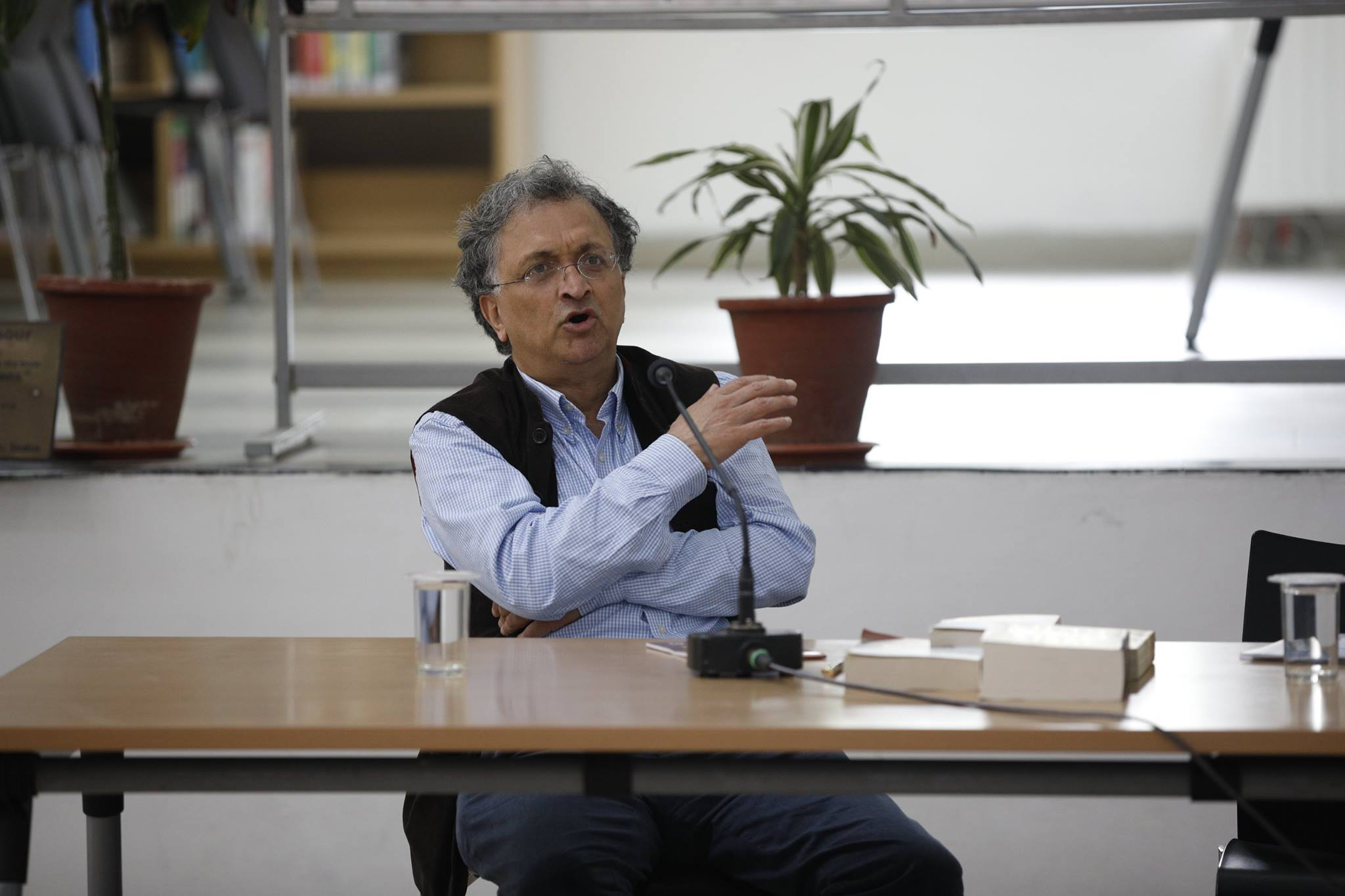
  Ramachandra Guha
- Mukul Kesavan, historian, novelist and political and social essayist
- Rajiv Malhotra, author, philanthropist, intellectual, writer
- Mammen Mathew, Chief Editor of the Malayala Manorama, Padma Shri awardee
- Anurag Mathur, author and journalist
- Rajiv Mehrotra, writer, television producer-director, documentary film maker
- Ningombam Bupenda Meitei, essayist and poet in English and Meitei languages
- Satyarth Nayak, Author of Sridevi: The Eternal Screen Goddess and The Emperor's Riddles and Screenwriter for Sony TV epic historical series Porus
- Makarand Paranjape, novelist and poet
- Janice Pariat, author, first Sahitya Akademi Award recipient for English literature from Meghalaya
- Prem Behari Narain Raizada, calligrapher and writer of the Constitution of India
- Maroof Raza, Defence analyst, writer, and educationalist
- Raam Reddy, author, filmmaker
- Allan Sealy, writer, finalist Booker Prize
- Krishna Kant Shukla, physicist, musician, poet, ecologist and educator
- Khushwant Singh (1915–2014), author
- Parismita Singh, author, illustrator, graphic novelist
- Ashok Vajpeyi, Hindi poet, essayist, and chairman, Lalit Kala Akademi India's National Academy of Arts, Govt of India
- Nirmal Verma, writer, novelist, activist and translator
- Ramkumar Verma (1905–1990), Hindi poet

== Art ==
- Shakti Maira, artist, sculptor, writer
- Rajeev Sethi, art curator, scenographer, designer
- Ram Kumar, artist, awarded Padma Bhushan

== Academics ==
=== Social Sciences and Humanities ===
Economics

- Kusum Ailawadi, economist; Professor of Marketing at Tuck School of Business, Dartmouth College
- Amit Bando, economist; inaugural executive director, International Partnership for Energy Efficiency Cooperation (IPEEC), OECD
- Kaushik Basu, economist; former Senior Vice President and Chief Economist of the World Bank; former CEA to the Government
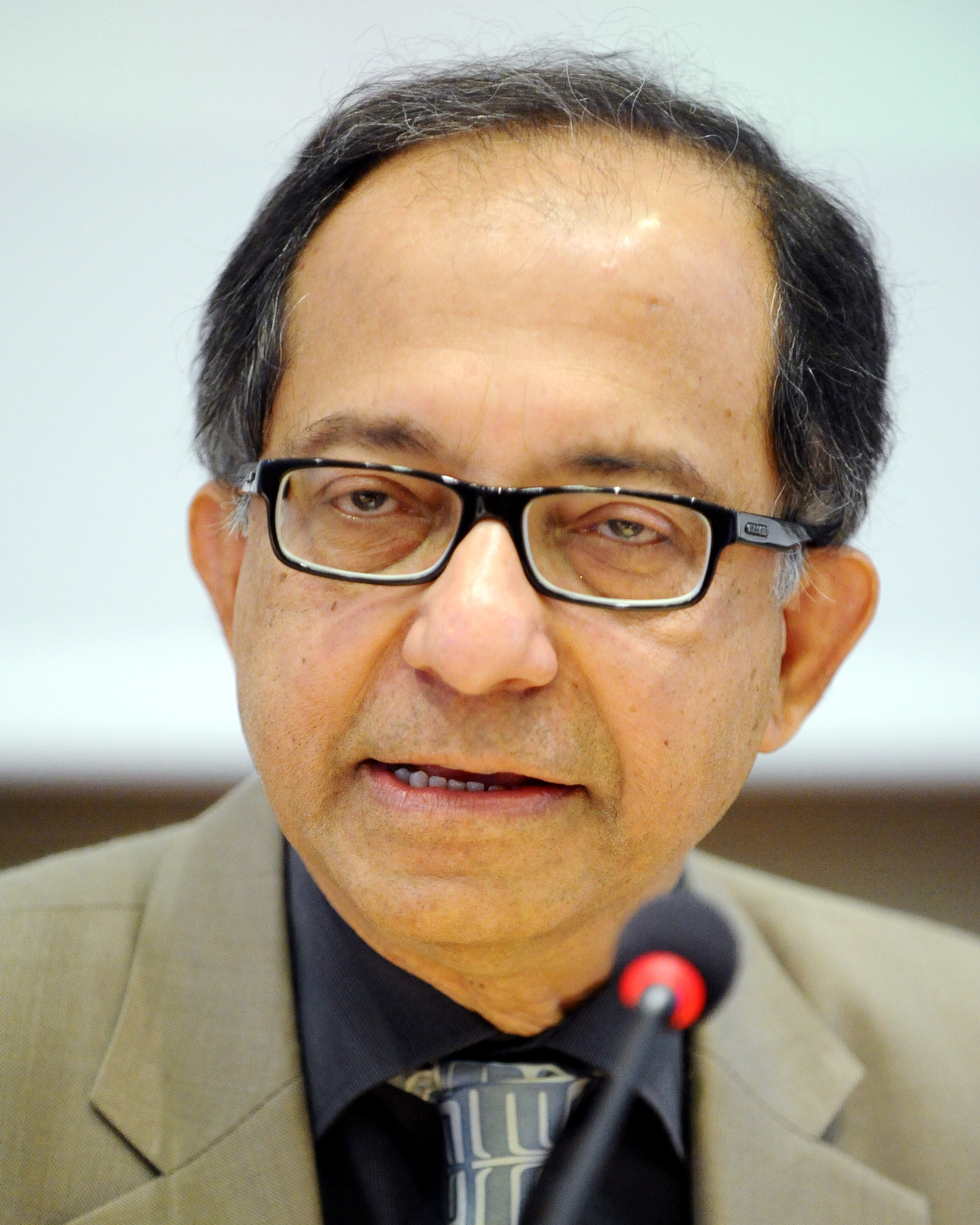
  Kaushik Basu
- Bhaskar Chakravorti, economist; Dean, The Fletcher School at Tufts University
- Ajay Chhibber, economist; first Director General of the Independent Evaluation Office, Government of India
- Siddhartha Chib, econometrician; Fellow of the American Statistical Association and professor at Washington University in St. Louis
- Pradeep Dubey, game theorist and professor at Yale University
- Indermit Gill, economist; Senior Vice President and Chief Economist of the World Bank
- Ranjay Gulati, organizational behaviour scholar, Professor of Business Administration at the Harvard Business School
- Sanjay Jain, development economist; Senior Fellow in the Department of Economics at the University of Oxford
- Rajiv Kumar, economist, vice-chairman of the NITI Aayog
- Deepak Lal (1940 – 2020), economist; former President of Mont Pelerin Society
- Shailendra Raj Mehta, economist, president and director of MICA
- Deepak Nayyar, economist; former Chief Economic Advisor to the Government of India
- Rohini Pande, development economist; professor at Yale University
- Manoj Pant, Director Indian Institute of Foreign Trade
- Prabhat Patnaik, Marxist economist
- Sunder Ramaswamy, development economist, Inaugural Vice Chancellor of Krea University
- Abhijit Sen, former member of planning commission
- Arunava Sen, economist; recipient of the Infosys Prize
- Mihir Shah, former member of planning commission
- Arvind Subramanian, economist; former Chief Economic Advisor to the Government of India
- Bhaskar Vira, economist and geographer; professor of Political Economy, Head of Department of Geography, University of Cambridge
- Arvind Virmani, economist; former Chief Economic Advisor to the Government of India
- Hitendra Wadhwa, professor at Columbia Business School.

History

- Basudev Chatterji, historian; former chairperson of the Indian Council of Historical Research
- Nayanjot Lahiri, historian; recipient of the Infosys Prize
- Amrita Narlikar, Fellow, Darwin College, Cambridge
- Gyanendra Pandey, former chair of the Department of Anthropology at Johns Hopkins University
- Upinder Singh, historian; recipient of the Infosys Prize
- Sanjay Subrahmanyam, economic historian; recipient of the Infosys Prize, Dan David Prize; Professor at UCLA
- Ishtiaq Hussain Qureshi; Pakistani historian
- Chetan Singh, historian; former director of the Indian Institute of Advanced Studies
- Hari Sen, historian

Philosophy

- Divya Dwivedi, philosopher
- Shaj Mohan, philosopher

=== Natural and Mathematical Sciences ===
- Siva Athreya, mathematician and Shanti Swarup Bhatnagar laureate
- Raghu Raj Bahadur, theoretical statistician; formerly Professor at University of Chicago; considered "one of the architects of the modern theory of mathematical statistics"
- V. Balakrishnan, theoretical physicist
- Utpal Banerjee, molecular biologist; Distinguished Professor at UCLA; Fellow of the American Academy of Arts and Sciences
- Charusita Chakravarty, chemical physicist and Shanti Swarup Bhatnagar laureate
- Eknath Prabhakar Ghate, mathematician and Shanti Swarup Bhatnagar laureate
- Suraj N. Gupta, theoretical physicist
- Naeem Ahmad Khan, Pakistani nuclear physicist; former secretary Pakistan Atomic Energy Commission
- Deepak Kumar (1946–2016), physicist and Shanti Swarup Bhatnagar laureate
- Krishna Kumar (chemist), chairman, Department of Chemistry, Tufts University (2006–2009; 2012–2018)
- Satish Chandra Maheshwari (1933–2019), molecular biologist and Shanti Swarup Bhatnagar Prize recipient
- Venkatesh Narayanamurti, physicist, former Dean of the School of Engineering and Applied Sciences at Harvard University
- Pran Nath, particle physicist, recipient Alexander von Humboldt Prize
- Neelakantha Bhanu Prakash, the "fastest human calculator in the world"
- Ramamurti Rajaraman, theoretical physicist, Shanti Swarup Bhatnagar laureate, Leo Szilard Awardee, former Co-chair International Panel on Fissile Materials
- Vaidyeswaran Rajaraman, computer pioneer, Padma Bhushan recipient and Shanti Swarup Bhatnagar laureate
- Kamalini Ramdas, Professor of Management Science and Operations and Deloitte Chair in Innovation & Entrepreneurship at London Business School
- Anupam Saikia, mathematician, Cambridge Math Wrangler
- Dinesh Singh, mathematician, 21st Vice-Chancellor of the University of Delhi
- Manik Varma, computer scientist, Shanti Swarup Bhatnagar laureate

== Media and journalism ==
- Shiv Aroor, editor and anchor at India Today
- Raghav Bahl, former director of Network 18, founder of The Quint
- Shereen Bhan, managing editor of CNBC-TV18 and World Economic Forum's Young Global Leaders 2009
- Ajit Bhattacharjea (1924–2011), newspaper editor, the Hindustan Times, The Times of India and The Indian Express
- Vikram Chandra, former CEO, NDTV Group
- Arvind Narayan Das, Founding Editor, Biblio
- Parag Kumar Das, human rights activist and Assamese journalist assassinated in 1996
- David Devadas, journalist, writer and columnist; expert on Kashmir conflict
- Saba Dewan, documentary film maker
- Barkha Dutt, television journalist, columnist, group editor with NDTV
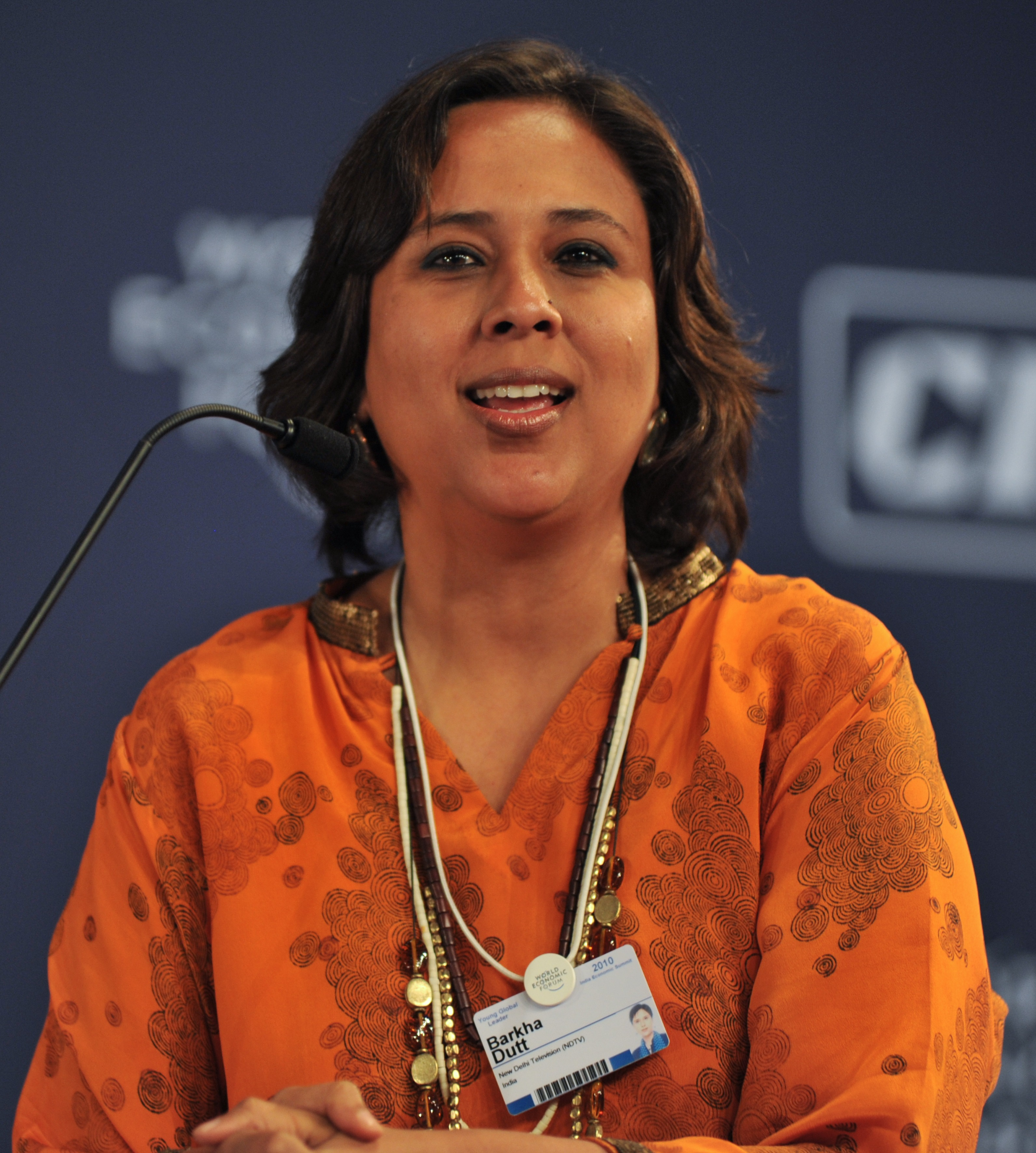
  Barkha Dutt
- Bhaskar Ghose, former Secretary, Ministry of Information and Broadcasting, former Director General of Doordarshan
- Sagarika Ghose, journalist, news anchor and author
- Samir Jain, Vice-chairman of The Times Group (Bennett, Coleman & Co. Ltd.)
- Prem Shankar Jha, economist, journalist and writer
- Novy Kapadia, football journalist, critic and commentator
- Siddharth Kak, documentary filmmaker and creator of TV show Surabhi
- Ritu Kapur, media entrepreneur
- Arun Shourie, journalist, author and politician; winner of the Ramon Magsaysay Award
- Sonia Singh, editorial director of NDTV
- Aman Sethi, journalist and writer; editor-in-chief of HuffPost India
- Sreenath Sreenivasan, former Dean Columbia School of Journalism
- Paranjoy Guha Thakurta, journalist, writer, and documentary maker; former Editor, Economic and Political Weekly
- George Verghese (1927–2014), editor of the Hindustan Times and The Indian Express, winner of the Ramon Magsaysay Award

== Sports ==
- Neha Aggarwal, Olympian
- Kirti Azad, Cricketer, winner of the 1983 Cricket World Cup
- Ajeet Bajaj, mountaineer, part of first father-daughter duo to scale Mount Everest
- Ranjit Bhatia, Olympian
- Unmukt Chand, Captain of the Indian U-19 Cricket team; Winner of the 2012 Under-19 Cricket World Cup
- Anjum Chopra, former Captain of Indian Women Cricket Team
- Michael Dalvi, Indian Cricketer
- Hari Dang, educationist and mountaineer
- Ashok Gandotra, Indian Cricketer
- Arun Lal, Indian Cricketer
- Mirza Masood, Olympic Gold Medalist
- Vijay Mehra, Emirati cricketer
- Jaspal Rana, Gold Medallist at the 1994 Asian Games & 1998 Commonwealth Games
- Sandeep Sejwal, Olympian
- Akanksha Singh, Captain, India Women's National Basketball Team
- Karni Singh, Olympian
- Mansher Singh, Olympian
- Ranjit Singh, Olympian
- Randhir Singh, Olympian; Indian representative to the International Olympic Committee
- Mandip Singh Soin, mountaineer, explorer, Fellow of the Royal Geographical Society

== Social Work ==
- John Dayal, human rights and Christian political activist
- Vrinda Grover, lawyer, researcher, and human rights and women's rights activist
- Shabnam Hashmi, founder ANHAD
- Harsh Mander, former IAS officer, human rights activist
- Sanjit Roy, social activist and educator; founder Barefoot College

== Faculty ==
This list includes notable faculty members who served at St. Stephen’s College, Delhi, but did not receive any degree from the college. This is not an exhaustive list.

- Mohammad Amin, historian; Padma Bhushan Awardee
- Charles Freer Andrews, educator, social reformer, and activist for Indian Independence
- Prabhu Lal Bhatnagar, mathematician, known for Bhatnagar–Gross–Krook operator; Padma Bhushan Awardee
- Virander Singh Chauhan, scientist; worked on genetic engineering and biotechnology; known for contributions to the development of a recombinant vaccine for malaria
- Gopi Chand Narang, poet and literary critic; Padma Bhushan Awardee
- S. K. Rudra, first Indian principal of St Stephen's College, Delhi
- Percival Spear, OBE (1901–1982); historian of modern South Asia
- Valson Thampu, former Principal; served from 2009 to 2016
- Anil Wilson, former Principal; served from 1991 to 2007
