= Adutha Varisu =

1983 film by S. P. Muthuraman

- Theatrical release poster
- Directed by: S. P. Muthuraman
- Screenplay by: Panchu Arunachalam
- Story by: Nabendu Ghosh
- Produced by: Dwarakish
- Starring: Rajinikanth; Sridevi
- Cinematography: Babu
- Edited by: R. Vittal
- Music by: Ilaiyaraaja
- Production company: Dwarakish Chitra
- Release date: 7 July 1983
- Running time: 135 minutes
- Country: India
- Language: Tamil

Adutha Varisu (/əduθə vɑːrɪsu/ transl. The next heir) is a 1983 Indian Tamil-language action drama film written by Panchu Arunachalam and directed by S. P. Muthuraman. The film stars Rajinikanth and Sridevi. It is a remake of the 1972 Hindi film Raja Jani, which itself is a remake of the 1965 Bengali film Rajkanya. The film was released on 7 July 1983.

== Plot ==
Zamindar Rathnakumar of Somanathapuram and his family are pursued by Muthukaruppan and his soldiers, who seek vengeance for the death of Muthukaruppan's brother, Jambulingam. In the attack, Muthukaruppan kills Rathnakumar and his wife, Mallikadevi, leaving their six‑year‑old daughter Radha an orphan. Rathnakumar’s courtier, Vijay, rescues Radha and attempts to flee, but he is ambushed, and Radha is thrown into the river.

Twelve years later, Queen Rajalakshmi, the zamindar's mother, mourns the disappearance of her granddaughter Radha, the rightful heir. The will stipulates that if Radha is not found within the next six months, the entire wealth will transfer to a trustee for public welfare. Diwan Rajalingam hires Kannan, a small‑time bounty hunter, to locate a girl who can impersonate Radha and claim the throne, thereby allowing Rajalingam to seize the wealth after Rajalakshmi’s death. After months of searching, Kannan comes across a nomadic girl, Valli, a tribal dancer whose facial features resemble those of the missing Radha. Canning a way to secure Valli's cooperation, Kannan enlists his colleague to pretend to assault her, staging a fake murder. He then "rescues" Valli from the attackers on a train, gaining her trust. Valli moves into Kannan's house, concealing the murder. Kannan's cook, Ramanna, advises Valli to develop feelings for Kannan, hoping that love will keep her there permanently.

Kannan feeds Radha false information, warning her that the police are hunting her for the murder of her abuser, and insists she must begin impersonating Radha. With no alternative, Valli agrees. Over the next month, Kannan trains her in language, etiquette, dress, and body language, grooming her to play the lost heiress. Valli falls in love with Kannan, but he, harboring a deep distrust of women, rejects her affection. Valli demands that he give up his drinking; Kannan, swayed by her insistence, promises to cut back. Later, after learning how Kannan has molded her for the ruse, Valli feels betrayed and leaves, accusing him of being obsessed with money. Ramanna intercepts her, revealing Kannan's tragic past: his former friend Sundaram swindled him out of ₹400,000 (equivalent to ₹6.8 million or US$70,000 in 2023) for a business venture, and his lover Usha abandoned him when his fortunes fell. Disillusioned, Kannan turned to ruthless money‑making and shut himself off from love.

Ramanna pleads with Valli to continue the charade, warning that Kannan will relapse into alcoholism if she abandons him, noting that he was happy only when Valli was around. Valli, hoping Kannan might eventually recognize her love, agrees to play as Radha. Kannan and Rajalingam succeed in convincing Rajalakshmi that Valli is her long‑lost granddaughter, Radha. Rajalakshmi summons the courtier Vijay, Pratap, Radha's former teacher, and Dr. Gowtham for verification. After their tests, they all confirm that the girl claiming to be Radha is genuine. To remove any lingering doubt, Rajalakshmi asks what Radha's favorite childhood instrument was; Valli, playing the part, sits at a piano and performs, solidifying Rajalakshmi's belief. The sight of the piano triggers an unexplainable feeling in Valli. Ramanna suggests she make Kannan jealous by getting close to Pratap, hoping to awaken his possessiveness. Meanwhile, Valli's tribal foster parents are captured by Pratap and Rajalingam and thrown in jail.

At a public ceremony, Rajalakshmi announces the property transfer and the engagement of Radha and Pratap, sparking Kannan's jealousy. Kannan's ex‑lover, Usha, appears as a dancer, and it's revealed that she and Pratap are in a relationship. Usha pressures Pratap to marry her, but he refuses, citing the wealth he would gain. Usha threatens to expose their affair to Rajalakshmi, prompting Rajalingam to kill her. Kannan falls back into drinking, but a change of heart makes him confess his love for Radha. Radha admits she only pretended to love Pratap to manipulate Kannan. They plan a midnight escape, but Rajalingam overhears them, arrests Kannan, and has him tortured in prison, threatening Radha to stay silent or Kannan will die. Wedding preparations move forward, and Rajalingam uses a body double, Veeraiyan, wearing a mask to impersonate Kannan and avoid suspicion.

In prison, Kannan learns from Valli's tribal foster parents that Valli truly is the real Radha. They orchestrate an escape, and Kannan, disguised as a spiritual guru, infiltrates the palace, beats Veeraiyan (the fake Kannan), and takes his place, gaining Rajalingam's trust. Meanwhile, a dying Rajalakshmi reveals the hidden treasury's location to Radha, prompting Rajalingam and Pratap to follow them. Thinking Kannan is still the impostor, they approach the treasury, where Rajalakshmi finally discovers Rajalingam's treachery. Kannan engages in a fierce battle with Veeraiyan, Rajalingam, Pratap, and Rajalingam's guards. Rajalingam accidentally stabs his son Pratap while trying to defend the treasure. Rajalingam reveals to Rajalakshmi that he hired Kannan and Valli to impersonate Radha, unaware that Valli was the genuine princess Radha.

Ramanna arrives with Valli's foster parents and explains that they rescued the toddler Radha from the river and raised her as their own daughter, Valli, without knowing her true identity. As proof, they present the lion‑inscribed pendant, the zamindari heirloom from Radha's chain. Ramanna goes to fetch the police to arrest Rajalingam. The film concludes with Rajalakshmi blessing the marriage of her granddaughter Radha to Kannan.

== Cast ==
- Rajinikanth as Kannan
- Sridevi as Radha / Valli
- Raveendran as Pratap
- Silk Smitha as Usha
- V. K. Ramasamy as Valli's foster father
- Cho Ramaswamy as Ramanna
- Senthamarai as Diwan Rajalingam
- V. Gopalakrishnan as Vijay
- C. L. Anandan as Veeraiyan
- S. V. Ramadas as Muthukaruppan
- S. S. Chandran in a special appearance as Kannan's colleague
- S.R. Veeraraghavan as Dr. Gowtham
- LIC Narasimhan as Sundaram
- S. Varalakshmi as Rajalakshmi
- Manorama as Valli's foster mother
- Vasantha in a cameo appearance as Mallikadevi, Rathnakumar's wife
- Jaishankar in a special appearance as Rathnakumar

== Production ==
Adutha Varisu is a remake of the 1972 Hindi film Raja Jani, which itself was loosely based on the 1956 American film Anastasia (1956). The film was produced by Dwarakish. The filming was held at Udaipur, Rajasthan.

== Soundtrack ==
The soundtrack was composed by Ilaiyaraaja. The disco song "Aasai Nooru Vagai" was remixed by Yuvan Shankar Raja for Kurumbu (2003). The song "Dan Dana Dan" from the Hindi film Department (2012) too was adapted from "Aasai Nooru Vagai".

Track listing
No.	Title	Lyrics	Singer(s)	Length
1.	"Pesa Koodathu"	Panchu Arunachalam	S. P. Balasubrahmanyam, P. Susheela	4:35
2.	"Vaa Raja Vandhu Paaru"	Vaali	S. Janaki	4:26
3.	"Vaazhga Raja Vaazhga Rani"	Panchu Arunachalam	S. P. Sailaja, S. Janaki	4:30
4.	"Kaveriye Kavikuyiley"	Panchu Arunachalam	S. P. Balasubrahmanyam, S. Janaki	4:35
5.	"Aasai Nooru Vagai"	Panchu Arunachalam	Malaysia Vasudevan	4:31
6.	"Ennaiah ABC"	Vaali	S. P. Balasubrahmanyam, S. Janaki	4:28
Total length:				27:05

== Release and reception ==
Adutha Varisu was released on 7 July 1983 and become hit at the box office. The overseas rights for the film were bought by R. B. Choudary's Super Good Films. Kalki criticised the film for lack of originality.

== Bibliography ==
- Nayak, Satyarth (2019). Sridevi: The Eternal Screen Goddess. India: Penguin Random House. ISBN 9789353056780.
- Ramachandran, Naman (2014) [2012]. Rajinikanth: The Definitive Biography. New Delhi: Penguin Books. ISBN 978-0-14-342111-5.
