= Taxi Driver (1978 film) =

- Theatrical release poster
- Directed by: N. S. Manian
- Written by: N. S. Manian
- Produced by: T. R. Seenivasan
- Starring: Jaishankar; M. R. Radha; Sridevi; Srikanth; S. A. Ashokan
- Cinematography: N. Balakrishnan
- Edited by: G. Radha Krishnan
- Music by: M. S. Viswanathan
- Production company: Charu Chitra Films
- Release date: 18 August 1978
- Country: India
- Language: Tamil

Taxi Driver is a 1978 Indian Tamil-language film directed and written by N. S. Manian. The film stars Jaishankar, M. R. Radha, Sridevi, Srikanth and S. A. Ashokan. It was released on 18 August 1978, and emerged a success.

== Cast ==
- Jaishankar
- M. R. Radha
- Sridevi
- Srikanth
- S. A. Ashokan
- Praveena Bhagyaraj
- V. Gopalakrishnan
- Suruli Rajan
- A. Karunanidhi
- Vennira Aadai Moorthy
- Pandari Bai
- Manorama
- Oru Viral Krishna Rao
- Pakoda Kadhar
- T. K. S. Natarajan

== Production ==
Taxi Driver is the 150th film for Jaishankar as an actor. It was colourised via Eastmancolor.

== Soundtrack ==
The music was composed by M. S. Viswanathan. The song "Idhu Raja Gopura Deepam Alla" is set in the Carnatic raga known as Revati, and "Sugamana Sindhanyil" is set in Bowli. The song "Santhi My Holy Angel" sung by Vani Jairam and S. P. Balasubrahmanyam attained popularity.

All lyrics are written by Kannadasan.

Track listing
No.	Title	Singer(s)	Length
1.	"Sugamana Sindhanaiyil"	S. P. Balasubrahmanyam, S. Janaki
2.	"Santhi My Holy Angel"	S. P. Balasubrahmanyam, Vani Jairam
3.	"Ragasiyasurangathil"	S. P. Balasubrahmanyam, L. R. Eswari
4.	"Edhu Raaja Gopura Deepam"	S. P. Balasubrahmanyam, M. S. Viswanathan

== Critical reception ==
Anna wrote that, despite having a clichéd plot and scenes, the direction and cinematography make it a watchable film. The Indian Express felt the director's good intentions about taxi drivers being exploited were marred by "plots and counter-plots" and that he "often vacillates and seems to concentrate on a vague love story" while calling the comedy insipid and music as disappointing but praised M. R. Radha for sustaining the film.

== Bibliography ==
- Nayak, Satyarth (2019). Sridevi: The Eternal Screen Goddess. Penguin Random House. ISBN 9789353056780.
- Sundararaman (2007) [2005]. Raga Chintamani: A Guide to Carnatic Ragas Through Tamil Film Music (2nd ed.). Chennai: Pichhamal Chintamani. OCLC 295034757.
