= Hitendra =

Hitendra is an Indian masculine given name. Notable people with the name include:

- Hitendra Wadhwa
- Hitendra Thakur
- Hitendra Narayan
- Hitendra Kanaiyalal Desai
- Hitendra Nath Goswami
