= EXL Service =

American multinational professional services

ExlService Holdings, Inc.
- Type: Public
- Traded as: Nasdaq: EXLS; S&P 400 component
- Founded: April 1999; 27 years ago
- Founders: Vikram Talwar; Rohit Kapoor
- Headquarters: New York City, U.S.
- Key people: Rohit Kapoor (chairman and CEO)
- Services: Data analytics and digital operations and solutions company
- Revenue: ▲US$2,087.6 billion (2025)
- Number of employees: 68,000+
- Website: www.exlservice.com

EXL is a global data and AI company that offers services and solutions to reinvent client business models, drive better outcomes and unlock growth with speed. The company is headquartered in New York and has 68000+ professionals in locations throughout the United States, Europe, Asia, Latin America, Australia and South Africa.

EXL was co-founded in 1999 by Vikram Talwar and Rohit Kapoor.

== Leadership ==
After formation in 1999, Vikram Talwar was chief executive officer (CEO) and vice-chairman. Rohit Kapoor is now chairman and CEO. Previously, Kapoor was vice chairman and president.

== Acquisitions ==
In August 2001, Conseco acquired EXL and operated it as a wholly owned subsidiary. In 2002, Oak Hill Capital Partners and FTVentures acquired the company from Conseco. The company's stock started trading on the NASDAQ exchange on October 20, 2006, under the symbol EXLS.

Shortly before EXL's debut on NASDAQ, it started down the path of growth through acquisitions with the purchase of the peer company Inductis. This acquisition was aimed at diversifying the revenue stream for EXL; prior to acquisition, 90% of EXL's revenues were from business process outsourcing (BPO), while after, BPO accounted for 70% with the balance in research and analytics and advisory services.

In 2011, EXL expanded their delivery footprint in Eastern Europe and South East Asia through acquisition of OPI.

In 2013, in reaction to the establishment of the Affordable Care Act and its mandate that all Americans acquire health insurance, EXL was reported to have planned a major run of acquisitions in the United States healthcare industry. At the time of this report in 2013, EXL drew roughly 10% of its revenues from the healthcare industry.

In 2014, EXL expanded into Latin America through a strategic joint venture with CT&S through which EXL's technology experience would be combined with CT&S's local knowledge and brand image. This joint venture also supported the growing customer base of EXL for Spanish-language services.

In 2018, EXL acquired SCIOInspire Holdings, expanding its healthcare analytics capabilities.

In 2021, EXL acquired Clairvoyant, adding scale in data, AI, and cloud engineering.

In 2024, EXL announced the acquisition of ITI Data, a data management solutions firm that works with the world's largest banks, financial services and healthcare companies.

In 2026, EXL completed the acquisition of iMerit, an AI model training and reinforcement learning leader.

== Fact sheet ==
Year	Revenue (million $)	Employees
2003	9 (est)	
2005	27.7	
2006		5,500
2007		8,200
2012	443	20,000
2014	525	
2015	628.5	
2016	686.0	25,000
2017	762.3	28,000
2018	883.1	>29,000
2019	991.3	>31,000
2021	1,120.0	>37,000
2022	1,412	>45,000
2023	1,631	>54,000
2024	1838.4	>59,000
2025	2087.6	>65,000

=== Acquisition history ===
2026

EXL completed the acquisition of iMerit, an AI model training and reinforcement learning leader, on August 03, 2026.

2024

EXL announced the acquisition of ITI Data, a data management solutions firm that works with the world's largest banks, financial services and healthcare companies on August 1, 2024.

2021

EXL acquired Clairvoyant, a global data, AI, and cloud services firm, on December 20, 2021. Clairvoyant specializes in data engineering and cloud enablement, further supporting EXL's clients in insurance, healthcare, banking and financial services, and retail.

2018

EXL acquired SCIOInspire Holdings, a healthcare analytics company on July 2, 2018. The company, known as SCIO Health Analytics, specializes in healthcare data and analytics, with a focus on payment integrity and fraud, waste, and abuse.

==== 2015 ====
EXL acquired RPM Direct LLC and RPM Data Solutions, LLC (collectively, "RPM") on 23 March 2015. RPM specializes in analyzing large consumer-data sets to segment populations, predict response rates, forecast customer lifetime value, design and execute targeted, multi-channel marketing campaigns, especially in areas of healthcare and insurance. The purchase was made in $47 million cash plus contingent cash consideration of up to $23 million and about 122,131 shares of restricted stock.

==== 2014 ====
In July, EXL purchased the business process consultancy Blue Slate Solutions, which specialized in "optimizing business processes in the Healthcare industry".

In August, EXL acquired a majority stake (51%) in the business process outsourcing unit of Carvajal Technologia y Servicios (CT&S), thereby establishing a joint-venture between the two companies which would directly provide services to clients in Latin America as well as oversee global delivery of EXL's Spanish-language services.

==== 2012 ====
In October, EXL acquired Landacorp, a provider of healthcare technology.

==== 2011 ====
In May, EXL had entered into a definitive agreement to acquire Outsource Partners International for US$90 million, one of the last standing pure play Finance & Accounting Outsourcing (FAO) service providers. Despite the reduction in pure play FAO service providers, at the time there were over 20 companies providing FAO services as part of their portfolio.

==== 2010 and before ====
In July 2006, EXL acquired Inductis for $20 million. Inductis and EXL both had expertise and services in the same areas, were similarly structured, and were headquartered in the United States with services delivered primarily out of India.

== Locations ==
EXL has offices US, UK (London), Dublin, Ireland, India, Philippines, Czech Republic, Romania, Bulgaria, Colombia, Australia, Ireland and South Africa.

== Competition ==
Around 2006, EXL's primary competitors were Genpact, IBM and Accenture.

As of 2013, EXL was one of the three companies offering business process outsourcing services and listed on stock exchanges in the United States, the other two being Genpact and WNS Global Services. WNS started trading in the United States in July 2006, three months before EXL joined the NASDAQ exchange.

== See also ==
- Outsourcing
