= Madan Mohan Sabharwal =

Indian social worker

Shri Madan Mohan Sabharwal OBE
- Born: 21 August 1922; Bikrampur, Dhaka, India
- Died: 10 March 2018 (aged 95)
- Occupations: Social worker Business executive
- Known for: HelpAge India
- Spouse: Suchitra
- Children: 6
- Awards: Padma Shri; Vayoshreshtha Samman

Shri Madan Mohan Sabharwal OBE, (21 August 1922 – 10 March 2018) was an Indian business executive, social worker and a former president of the HelpAge India. Born on 21 August 1922, he graduated in Economics from the St. Stephen's College, Delhi before starting a career which saw him holding senior positions at several business enterprises. He has served such companies as Dunlop India, Bata India, Britannia Industries, Indian Oxygen Limited, Needle Industries India and Precision Electronics Ltd as the chairman and has been a member of the board of directors of Oil India Limited, National Aluminium Company, Federal-Mogul Goetze (India), Avery India, Fibre Glass Pilkington Limited and Ranbaxy Laboratories. In 1980, he joined HelpAge India, became its president in 1986 and is associated with the organization as its president emeritus. He sits in the boards of Nutrition Foundation of India and the National Council for Older Persons.

Sabharwal was awarded the Officer of the Most Excellent Order of the British Empire in 1998 by the British Government. The Government of India awarded him the fourth highest civilian honour of the Padma Shri, in 2008, for his contributions to society. He is also a recipient of the Lifetime Achievement Award of the International Conference on Geriatrics and Gerontology (2004) and the Vayoshreshtha Samman of the Ministry of Social Justice and Empowerment (2012).

== See also ==
- HelpAge India
- List of alumni of St. Stephen's College, Delhi
