= Satish Chandra Maheshwari =

Indian botanist (1933–2019)

- Born: 4 October 1933 (age 92); Jaipur, Rajasthan, India
- Died: 12 June 2019; Jaipur, Rajasthan, India
- Education: University of Delhi; Yale University
- Known for: Plant molecular biology
- Awards: 1972 Shanti Swarup Bhatnagar Prize; J. C. Bose Gold Medal; IBS Birbal Sahni Gold Medal; Goyal Award
- Scientific career
- Fields: Plant physiology; Biochemistry; Plant Molecular biology
- Workplaces: St. Stephen's College, Delhi; California Institute of Technology; Oxford University; Harvard Biological Laboratories; Jaipur National University
- Doctoral advisor: B. M. Johri

Satish Chandra Maheshwari (4 October 1933 – 12 June 2019) was an Indian botanist and a former professor at the University of Delhi. He is known for his contributions to the fields of plant physiology and plant molecular biology. Maheshwari is an elected fellow of the Indian Academy of Sciences, the Indian National Science Academy and the National Academy of Sciences, India. The Council of Scientific and Industrial Research, the apex agency of the Government of India for scientific research, awarded him the Shanti Swarup Bhatnagar Prize for Science and Technology, one of the highest Indian science awards, in 1972, for his contributions to biological sciences. He died from lung cancer on June 12, 2019.

== Biography ==
S. C. Maheshwari, born on 4 October 1933 in Jaipur in the Indian state of Rajasthan, did his schooling in Jaipur and, later, in Dacca (in the present day Bangladesh). He moved to India along with his family after the Indian independence in 1947 and graduated in botany (hons) from St. Stephen's College of the University of Delhi after which he secured his master's (MSc) and doctoral (PhD) degrees from the same university. Maheshwari's post-doctoral research was on the embryology of duckweeds under B. M. Johri and he started his career at his alma mater as a member of the faculty of science in 1954. After 4 years of service, Maheshwari obtained a Fulbright Smith Mundt Fellowship in 1959 and traveled to the US to where he continued his research at Yale University and California Institute of Technology. Returning to India, he resumed his career at Delhi University and served as a professor there as well as at Jaipur National University till his superannuation from service. In between, Maheshwari worked as a visiting scientist at Oxford University, as a Homi Bhabha Fellow at Harvard Biological Laboratories, USA during 1973–74, as a visiting professor at Yale University during 1981–82 and as a guest scientist at the International Centre for Genetic Engineering and Biotechnology.

== Legacy ==
One of the first significant contributions of Maheswari was the discovery of RNA polymerase activity in chloroplasts which he accomplished during his early stint at California Institute of Technology while working with Robert S. Bandurski and their researches revealed the presence of DNA in organelle. In 1966, he, along with Sipra Guha Mukherjee, developed a new high-speed culture technique for producing homozygous pure lines of haploid plants which is now in practice for crop improvement and for commercial production of horticultural and ornamental plants. Maheshwari's researches on plant growth hormones returned new protocols for the isolation of cytokinins and gibberellins and elucidated the function of salicylic acid during the flowering period. His work assisted in genetic engineering of plants and in the phytochrome control of plant metabolism.

Maheswari is the founder of the Department of Plant Molecular Biology at Delhi University, the first such department in India, where he established a unit for Plant Cell and Molecular Biology, another first in the country. Here, he is known to have led a group of scientists in the field of photobiology and in researches on rice chromosomes and their DNA sequencing. Maheshwari's researches have been detailed in over 200 articles and in a book, Signal Transduction in Plants: Current Advances, co-edited with Sudhir Kumar Sopory and Ralf Oelmüller. He has mentored 30 scholars in their MPhil, doctoral and post-doctoral researches and Sipra Guha Mukherjee (1938–2007), noted biologist, was one among them. (Note: Sipra Guha Mukherjee was his associate in researches on haploid development.)

== Awards and honors ==
Maheswari was awarded the Shanti Swarup Bhatnagar Prize, one of the highest Indian science awards, by the Council of Scientific and Industrial Research in 1972. He also received several other honors including the Goyal Prize, J. C. Bose Gold Medal and Birbal Sahni Gold Medal of the Indian Botanical Society. A Homi Bhaba Fellow, Maheshwari was elected as a fellow by the Indian Academy of Sciences in 1975 and three years later, Indian National Science Academy also elected him as their fellow. He is also an elected fellow of the National Academy of Sciences, India (1979). Maheshwari's project, Survey and Synthesis the information in the area of molecular Biology of Plant Development and Differentiation, was selected for the Jawaharlal Nehru Fellowship in 1981 and the University of Hyderabad awarded him the Doctor of Science degree (honoris causa) in 2013.

== Selected bibliography ==
- S. C. Maheshwari; Nirmala Maheshwari; S. K. Sopory (January 2001). "Genomics, DNA chips and a revolution in plant biology" (PDF). Current Science. 80 (2).
- S. C. Maheswari (December 2007). "Sipra Guha Mukherjee (1938–2007)" (PDF). Current Science. 93 (12).
- S.K. Sopory; Ralf Oelmüller; S.C. Maheswari (6 December 2012). Signal Transduction in Plants: Current Advances. Springer Science & Business Media. ISBN 978-1-4615-1365-0.

== See also ==
- RNA polymerase
- Haploidy
- Cytokinins
- Gibberellins
- List of alumni of St. Stephen's College, Delhi
- List of University of Delhi people
