= HelpAge India =

Indian organization

- Founded: 1978
- Founder: Mr. Jackson Cole, Samson Daniel
- Type: 12A, 80G
- Purpose: Helping the Elderly
- Location: C-14 Qutab Institutional Area, New Delhi-110016, India
- Region served: India
- Website: www.helpageindia.org

HelpAge India is an Indian organization focused on the issues affecting older people and provides programs related to their welfare. Established in 1978, it serves vulnerable older people through programs supporting their well-being.

== History ==
HelpAge India began in the late 1960s when a Speaker of the Lok Sabha visited a counterpart in the House of Commons of the United Kingdom, who was also honorary secretary of Help the Aged. He came back with plans to setup something similar in India.

In March 1974, when Jackson Cole, founder of HelpAge International, visited India, philanthropist Samson Daniel, approached him for financial assistance to establish a member organization in Delhi. Cole instead offered training in fundraising. After a three-month training course in London, Daniel and his wife returned to India and organized a sponsored walk with schoolchildren in Delhi. In 1975, HelpAge International recruited additional staff to cover Bombay, Madras, and Calcutta.

HelpAge India is one of the founding members of HelpAge International, having 97 member countries representing the cause of the elderly at the United Nations. It is closely associated with Help the Aged, UK and has received a recognition from the United Nations for "Dedicated service in support of the United Nations Programme on Ageing". HelpAge India is also a full member of the International Federation on Ageing.

In April 1978, HelpAge India was registered in Delhi. Within three months it became autonomous as financial support ceased from the UK. Soon after, in July, the society was awarded Certificates of Exemption under Sections 12A and 80G of the Income Tax Act, 1961.

In 2020, HelpAge India received the UN Population Award for the care of elderly disadvantaged persons and senior citizens, a first for an NGO institution in India, in recognition of its work on population issues and efforts in the realization of rights of older persons in India since its inception.

== Programs ==
HelpAge India runs various programs serving the disadvantaged elderly:

Mobile Healthcare Units (MHU): This program provides healthcare to elders and their communities. The core of the program is a sponsored Mobile Healthcare Unit (MHU). This Unit provides primary healthcare to older persons in need, while also educating the community on preventive healthcare. Each MHU has a doctor, pharmacist and, social worker. There are more than 159 Mobile Healthcare Units working in 24 states, providing 2.9 million free treatments. They usually employ retired medical practitioners. The organization also supports self-reliance among elder people through the formation of Elder-Self-Help-Groups in rural India which supports 95,584 older persons through 7415 Elder-Self-Help Groups in 16 States.

Restoration of Vision: In India 62% elderly suffer from cataract blindness. Selected eye hospitals carry out surgeries with HelpAge India's support-a-Gran ration program which provides Homecare support to bedridden patients. All surgeries are performed only in base hospitals and not in makeshift camps. Since 1980, this program has benefitted more than 9 lakh elders, restoring their sight & dignity.

Cancer and Palliative Care: Cancer treatment in India can be costly and a majority of elders are not covered by any form of medical insurance. HelpAge India provides palliative care to end-stage cancer patients, in partnership with various cancer hospitals and organizations. Over 99,000 treatments have been supported since 1998.

Geriatric Physiotherapy: Under this program, elders with musculoskeletal diseases such as back pain, arthritis, paralysis, and other age-related mobility challenges are treated. The aim is to improve elder mobility levels and support daily living. The services are provided through stationary physiotherapy clinics and mobile services, to elders living in remote communities and homes for the aged.

Student Action for Value Education (SAVE): HelpAge works with schools across the country to promote awareness among students for respect towards the elderly. The organization also runs a school advocacy program focused on treating elders with love, care, and respect.

Digital Literacy for Elders: HelpAge has started an easy 'Digital Literacy' program introducing elders to digital tools through Digital Literacy workshops. Partner institutions, organizations, and volunteers are encouraged to conduct basic tutorials for elders.

== Awards and recognition ==
- United Nations Population Award in 2020.
- Shri Madan Mohan Sabharwal, former President Emeritus of HelpAge India was a recipient of:
  - Order of the British Empire (1998).
  - Padma Shri (26/01/2008).
