= Outsource Partners International =

Discontinued entity

- Company type: Private
- Industry: Outsourcing
- Founded: 2002; merger of a big four accounting firm's business process outsourcing (BPO) division and itAccounts
- Successor: EXL Service
- Headquarters: New York City, United States
- Key people: Clarence Schmitz (Chairman and CEO); Kishore Mirchandani (President); Glen Baker (CIO); George Evans (Managing Dir.-Bus.Dev.); Vince Sparrow (Sr. Managing Dir.); Brad Prock (Managing Dir.); Bryan MacQuarrie (Managing Dir.); Robert Klein (Managing Dir.)
- Services: Business process outsourcing Payroll administration Benefits administration General accounting Tax compliance Control & risk management
- Revenue: ▲$76 millionUSD (2011)
- Number of employees: 3700
- Website: www.opiglobal.com

Outsource Partners International (OPI) was acquired by EXL in June 2011. The acquisition marked the end of F&A outsourcing of OPI. OPI was a multinational company with headquarters in New York, NY and Los Angeles, CA. It operates from more than a dozen global locations throughout the US, UK, India, Bulgaria, and Malaysia. OPI was formed in 2002 through the acquisition of big four accounting firm's Business Process Outsourcing (BPO) division and itAccounts, a finance and accounting BPO company with an offshore F&A outsourcing facility in Bangalore, India. It offers finance, accounting and tax outsourcing services.

== Growth plan ==
Outsource Partners International (OPI) is an outsourcing company specializing in finance and accounting outsourcing (FAO) services. The company was originally established in 2002 through the acquisition of a big four accounting firm's (KPMG) Business Process Outsourcing (BPO) division and itAccounts. OPI handles companies' routine, recurring transactions as well as complex processes such as regulatory compliance, preparation of financial statements and SEC reporting. Through its onsite-offshore approach, key members of client staff transfer to OPI, yet remain onsite to interact with client executives and other departments. Additional services include revenue processing; vendor and payment processing; payroll and benefits administration; general accounting; financial reporting; fixed assets and capital accounting; cost and inventory accounting; regulatory compliance reporting; and management reporting. OPI also offers tax co-sourcing and tax outsourcing for data entry and tax from preparation. Clients are typically involved in the service, manufacturing, technology, retail, energy and not-for-profit industries. While its clients range in size from US$100 million to multi-billion dollar organizations, they average US$76 million in annual revenues. Its clients are both publicly traded and privately owned. Clients span cross-industry, including:

•Agriculture •Business Services •Consumer Products •Consumer Services •Education Products & Services •Energy & Utilities •Entertainment & Leisure •Financial Services •Healthcare •Hotels & Motels •Manufacturing •Media •Not For Profit •Real Estate •Retail •Technology •Telecommunications •Transportation & Logistics

OPI has grown to include 15 offices and service centers across the United States, United Kingdom, India, Bulgaria, and Malaysia. Its 3,700 employees occupy more than 500,000 square feet (46,000 m^{2}) of office space.

== Locations ==
=== North America ===
- Atlanta
- Chicago
- Dallas
- Houston
- Washington DC

=== Asia Pacific ===
- Bangalore
- Kochi
- Delhi
- Kuala Lumpur
- Noida (NCR)

=== Europe ===
- London
- Sofia
- Varna
