= Vaidyeswaran Rajaraman =

Indian computer scientist (1933–2025)

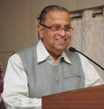
- Born: 8 September 1933; Erode, Madras Presidency, British India (now Tamil Nadu, India)
- Died: 8 November 2025 (aged 92); Bengaluru, Karnataka, India
- Education: St Stephen's College, Delhi; Delhi University; MIT; IISc Bangalore; University of Wisconsin-Madison
- Occupations: Computer scientist Academic; Author
- Years active: Since 1961
- Known for: Computer science academics and literature
- Awards: Padma Bhushan; Shanti Swarup Bhatnagar Prize; Om Prakash Bhasin Award; Homi Bhabha Prize; IISc Rustom Choksi Award; INAE Lifetime Contribution Award; IISc Distinguished Alumnus Award; CSI Lifetime Achievement Award

Vaidyeswaran Rajaraman (8 September 1933 – 8 November 2025) was an Indian computer scientist, academic and writer known for his pioneering efforts in the field of Computer Science Education in India. He is credited with the establishment of the first academic program in computer science in India, which he helped initiate at the Indian Institute of Technology, Kanpur in 1965. An elected fellow of all the Indian science academies, he was a recipient of Shanti Swarup Bhatnagar Prize, the highest Indian award in Science and Technology category for young scientists and several other honors including Om Prakash Bhasin Award and Homi Bhabha Prize. The Government of India awarded him the third highest civilian honor of the Padma Bhushan, in 1998, for his contributions to science.

== Life and career ==
Computer Centre at IIT Kanpur

Born on 8 September 1933 to Ramaswami Vaidyeswaran and Sarada at Erode in a part of Madras Presidency that is now the south Indian state of Tamil Nadu, Rajaraman married Dharma in 1964. He passed the HSC examination as a student of first batch of Madras Education Association (now known as DTEA) Higher Secondary School, New Delhi, in 1949. Rajaraman was awarded a scholarship by Delhi University after passing the All India Entrance Scholarship Examination and graduated with BSc (Hon) in Physics from St. Stephen's College of University of Delhi in 1952 and continued his higher studies at Indian Institute of Science, Bangalore (IISc) to obtain a Diploma of IISc (Electrical Communication Engineering) in 1955. He stayed on at IISc and designed and constructed non-linear units for an analogue computer and applied it for solving a number of engineering problems for which he was awarded an associateship by IISc in 1957. He was awarded an overseas scholarship by the government of India and joined Massachusetts Institute of Technology, Cambridge from which he obtained his MSc degree in Electrical Engineering in 1959. Thereafter, he enrolled himself at University of Wisconsin-Madison and did research on adaptive control systems, obtaining a PhD in 1961. He started his career as an Assistant Professor of Statistics at the University of Wisconsin-Madison. In 1962, he returned to India to work as an Assistant Professor of Electrical Engineering at Indian Institute of Technology, Kanpur (IITK). He went as a visiting Assistant Professor of Electrical Engineering at University of California, Berkeley during period 1965–66.It was during this time that he shifted his focus to then nascent discipline of computer science.

Supercomputer Education and Research Centre, IISc, Bangalore

In early 1965, with encouragement by H. K. Kesavan, Head of Electrical Engineering Dep't at IIT Kanpur, Rajaraman and his colleagues initiated a new MTech program with Computer Science as an option, the first time the subject was offered as an academic discipline in India. Later, he helped introduce a doctoral program, and a group led by him pioneered the use of decision tables in development, debugging, and optimization of complex computer programs. He initiated the first BTech program at IITKanpur in 1978 with an initial batch of 20 students. He became a Senior Professor at IITKanpur in 1974 and stayed there till 1982. He moved to Indian Institute of Science, Bangalore and developed low-cost parallel computers and a supercomputing facility of which he served as chairman from 1982 to 1994. During his tenure at IITKanpur and IISc, he guided 30 students in their doctoral studies. He published over 70 scientific papers in national and international peer-reviewed journals and 23 text books, including the first on computer programming published in India titled

- Principles of Computer Programming
- Computer Programming in FORTRAN 90 and 95
- Computer Oriented Numerical Methods, 3rd ed.,
- Analog Computation and Simulation,
- Analysis and Design of Information Systems, 3rd ed.,
- Computer Basics and C Programming,
- Computer Programming in C,
- Computer Programming in FORTRAN 77 (With an Introduction to FORTRAN 90), 4th ed.,
- Essentials of E-Commerce Technology,
- Introduction to Information Technology, 3rd ed.,
- Fundamentals of Computers, 6th ed.,
- Parallel Computers—Architecture and Programming, 2nd ed.,
- Computer Organization and Architecture,
- Digital Logic and Computer Organization,
- Introduction to Digital Computer Design, An, 5th ed.,
- Fundamentals of Computers

among others. His PhD thesis was on the Theory of parameter-perturbation adaptive and optimizing control systems and S.M. thesis was on Effects of Parameter Variations in Linear Amplifiers. He wrote a monograph, History of Computing in India: 1955-2010, on the invitation of IEEE Computer Society in 2014. It details the history of Information Technology in India.

Rajaraman, besides developing parallel computers, contributed in the development of real-time control system for Bhilai Steel Plant, designed the training modules for Tata Consultancy Services (TCS), and designed computer science curriculum for All India Council for Technical Education (AICTE), the national council for technical education in India. He was a member of the Electronics Commission during 1979–82. During his tenure in the Electronics Commission he chaired a committee which recommended the introduction of a new academic programme called Master of Computer Applications(MCA) for BSc and BCom students foreseeing the impending human resource shortage for the IT industry. This was a unique program in India. He was a council member of the Indian National Science Academy (INSA) from 1986 to 1988. He served as a consultant to Bharat Electronics (BEL), TCS, Electronics Corporation of India Limited (ECIL), Steel Authority of India Limited (SAIL) and Kerala Venture Capital. He chaired a committee set up by the Science Advisory Council to the Prime Minister in 1987 that recommended establishing Centre for the Development of Advanced Computing (CDAC) to design and develop supercomputers in India using parallel computing technology. He was a member of CDAC's governing council in its formative years. He was TataChem professor at IISc from 1991 to 1994 and the IBM Professor of Information Technology at Jawaharlal Nehru Centre for Advanced Scientific Research (JNCASR) from 1994 to 2001. He was a member of the board of directors of CMC Ltd., Canbank Computer Services Ltd., Encore Software Ltd., and IIIT, Kerala. He was a member of the Technical Advisory Panel of the Government of Karnataka from 1985 to 2014. During his tenure he advised the government on computerization of land registration (Bhoomi Project), Kaveri project of the stamps and registration department for computerising registration of urban properties, computerizing the court systems and many important e-governance projects. His hobbies included listening to classical Karnatik and Western music and reading fiction and non-fiction books.

Rajaraman died in Bengaluru on 8 November 2025, at the age of 92.

== Awards and honours ==
Rajaraman received Shanti Swarup Bhatnagar Prize, the highest Indian science and technology award for young scientists, in 1976, for his contributions in optimizing the use of decision tables and his pioneering work in computer science. This was followed by Homi Bhabha Prize in 1984 and the Indian Society of Technical Education Award for Excellence in Teaching in 1988. He was awarded Om Prakash Bhasin Award of the Shri Om Prakash Bhasin Foundation and Rustom Choksi Award of the Indian Institute of Science in 1993. The Government of India included him in the Republic Day Honours list in 1998 for the civilian award of the Padma Bhushan. The Indian National Academy of Engineering honored him with the Lifetime Contribution Award in Engineering in 2005 and he received the Distinguished Alumnus Award of the Indian Institute of Science in 2014. He had also delivered several award orations including the S.H. Zaheer Medal (1998) of the Indian National Science Academy and is a recipient of the Lifetime Achievement Award of the Computer Society of India, Dataquest, and Systems Society of India.

The Indian Academy of Sciences elected Rajaraman as its fellow in 1974 and the Indian National Science Academy and the National Academy of Sciences, India followed suit in 1982 and 1990 respectively. He was also an elected fellow of the Indian National Academy of Engineering, and has held the fellowships of the Computer Society of India (1974) and the Institute of Electronics and Telecommunication Engineers. The Bengal Engineering and Science University and the Indian Institute of Technology Kanpur have conferred the degree of Doctor of Science (honoris causa) on Rajaraman.

== See also ==
- Supercomputers
- Decision table
- List of University of Wisconsin–Madison people
- List of alumni of St. Stephen's College, Delhi
- List of Massachusetts Institute of Technology alumni
