= Manoj Pant =

Indian economist

Chancellor of Indian Institute of Foreign Trade
- In office 2017–2022
- Preceded by: Surajit Mitra
- Succeeded by: Rakesh Mohan Joshi

Personal details
- Born: India
- Citizenship: Indian
- Education: (B.A.) St Stephen's College, Delhi (M.A.) Delhi School of Economics; Delhi University (PhD) Southern Methodist University
- Occupation: Professor of International Trade

Manoj Pant is an Indian economist specialising in International Trade and is currently a visiting professor at Shiv Nadar University, he served as the Chancellor of Indian Institute of Foreign Trade from 2017-2022. Prior to that, he was a full-time professor at the Centre for International Trade and Development, Jawaharlal Nehru University, where he taught international trade theory. Before that he taught economics at Delhi University.

== Education ==
Pant has obtained his undergraduate degrees from St. Stephen's College, Delhi and his master's degree from Delhi School of Economics both under affiliation with Delhi University. He has done his Ph.D. at Southern Methodist University, Dallas, Texas, USA.

== Publications ==
Pant used to be a regular newspaper contributor writing for The Economic Times on trade, investment and competition issues. He has published two books and over a dozen articles.
