= Kamalini Ramdas =

British academic

Academic background
- Education: University of Pennsylvania (PhD, 1995); Delhi University; St Stephen's College, Delhi(B.S., 1986)

Academic work
- Discipline: Operations Management; Healthcare; Management Science
- Institutions: London Business School; University of Virginia; University of Texas at Austin

Kamalini Ramdas is a Professor of Management Science and Operations and Deloitte Chair in Innovation & Entrepreneurship at London Business School, with expertise in the areas of innovation, entrepreneurship, and operations management. Ramdas' research examines innovative approaches, including service innovation, operational innovation, and business model innovation, to accelerate value creation in various service and manufacturing industries.

== Career ==
Kamalini Ramdas earned her BS in mathematics from St. Stephen's College, Delhi University in 1986, M.S. in operations research from University of Delaware in 1989, and PhD in operations management from the Wharton School of University of Pennsylvania in 1995. Prior to joining London Business School in 2008, Ramdas served as Associate Professor of Business Administration at University of Virginia Darden School of Business. She was also on the faculty of McCombs School of Business of The University of Texas at Austin.

At London Business School, Ramdas is a Professor of Management Science and Operations and Deloitte Chair in Innovation & Entrepreneurship. She also serves as the Subject Area Chair of Management Science & Operations.

Between 2019 and 2020, she served as President of the Manufacturing and Service Operations Management Society (MSOM), one of the largest societies of the Institute for Operations Research and the Management Sciences (INFORMS).

== Academic work ==
Ramdas is known for her work in innovation, entrepreneurship, and operations management. Her work has found applications in a wide range of industries, including healthcare, telecommunication, consumer packaged goods, and assembled products.

In particular, she is a pioneering scholar in innovation in healthcare delivery, known internationally for her work in shared medical appointments. In 2011, she was invited to present her work on innovation in healthcare delivery at the World Economic Forum in Davos.

She serves or has served on the editorial board of major operations management journals, including Management Science, Manufacturing & Service Operations Management, IEEE Transactions on Engineering Management, and Productions and Operations Management.

== Publications ==
According to Google Scholar, Ramdas' 10 most widely cited papers are:

- Fisher, Marshall; Ramdas, Kamalini; Ulrich, Karl (1999). "Component Sharing in the Management of Product Variety: A Study of Automotive Braking Systems". Management Science. 45 (3): 297–315. doi:10.1287/mnsc.45.3.297. ISSN 0025-1909.
- Ramdas, Kamalini (2009). "Managing Product Variety: An Integrative Review and Research Directions". Production and Operations Management. 12 (1): 79–101. doi:10.1111/j.1937-5956.2003.tb00199.x. ISSN 1059-1478.
- Ramdas, Kamalini; Spekman, Robert E. (2000). "Chain or Shackles: Understanding What Drives Supply-Chain Performance". Interfaces. 30 (4): 3–21. doi:10.1287/inte.30.4.3.11644. ISSN 0092-2102.
- Ramdas, Kamalini; Sawhney, Mohanbir S. (2001). "A Cross-Functional Approach to Evaluating Multiple Line Extensions for Assembled Products". Management Science. 47 (1): 22–36. doi:10.1287/mnsc.47.1.22.10667. ISSN 0025-1909.
- Laseter, T.M.; Ramdas, K. (2002). "Product Types and Supplier Roles in Product Development: An Exploratory Analysis". IEEE Transactions on Engineering Management. 49 (2): 107–118. doi:10.1109/TEM.2002.1010879. ISSN 0018-9391. S2CID 7115319.
- Fisher, Marshall; Ramdas, Kamalini; Zheng, Yu-Sheng (2001). "Ending Inventory Valuation in Multiperiod Production Scheduling". Management Science. 47 (5): 679–692. doi:10.1287/mnsc.47.5.679.10485. ISSN 0025-1909.
- Ramdas, Kamalini; Randall, Taylor (2008). "Does Component Sharing Help or Hurt Reliability? An Empirical Study in the Automotive Industry". Management Science. 54 (5): 922–938. doi:10.1287/mnsc.1070.0791. ISSN 0025-1909.
- Ramdas, Kamalini; Fisher, Marshall; Ulrich, Karl (2003). "Managing Variety for Assembled Products: Modeling Component Systems Sharing". Manufacturing & Service Operations Management. 5 (2): 142–156. doi:10.1287/msom.5.2.142.16073. ISSN 1523-4614. Archived from the original on 28 April 2019.
- Parker, Chris; Ramdas, Kamalini; Savva, Nicos (2016). "Is IT Enough? Evidence from a Natural Experiment in India's Agriculture Markets" (PDF). Management Science. 62 (9): 2481–2503. doi:10.1287/mnsc.2015.2270. ISSN 0025-1909. S2CID 14480050.
- Ramdas, Kamalini; Darzi, Ara; Jain, Sanjay (2020). "'Test, re-test, re-test': using inaccurate tests to greatly increase the accuracy of COVID-19 testing". Nature Medicine. 26 (6): 810–811. doi:10.1038/s41591-020-0891-7. ISSN 1078-8956. PMC 7215136. PMID 32398878.
