= Gulrez Hoda =

Indian civil servant

Personal details
- Born: 30 January 1953 (age 73) Purnia, Bihar
- Profession: Social activist, bureaucrat
- Website: hikmatfoundation.org

Gulrez Hoda (born 30 January 1953) is a 1977 batch Indian Administrative Service (IAS) officer and a former member of the Bihar State Planning Board.

After World Bank, Mr Hoda established Hikmat Foundation to support girls education in remote and impoverished areas in Bihar.

== Early life ==
Mr Hoda was born in Purnia, Bihar. He received his bachelor's degree in Economics in 1972 from St. Stephen's College, Delhi, first master's degree in Economics in 1975 from Delhi School of Economics and second master's degree in Finance from George Washington University in 1996.

== Civil Service career ==
Mr Hoda joined the Indian Administrative Service in 1977 during his service tenure he has hold several important posts. He served as District Officer and State Secretariat in the Government of Assam for 9 years. He was Secretary in Department of Forestry & Soil Conservation in the Government of Meghalaya for 2 years after which he worked in Ministry of Finance as Director of Fund-Bank Division in the Department of Economic Affairs under the leadership of the then Finance Minister of India Dr. Manmohan Singh.

He was Adviser to Executive Director with World Bank Group for 4 years. Subsequently from 1996 to 2013 he worked with International Finance Corporation started as a Principal Investment Officer, He later became Director of Infrastructure and Natural Resources in Europe, Central Asia, Middle East & North Africa with International Finance Corporation.
