= Manik Varma (computer scientist) =

Indian computer scientist

- Education: St Stephen's College, Delhi; Delhi University; University of Oxford
- Awards: Shanti Swarup Bhatnagar Prize for Science and Technology (2019)
- Scientific career
- Fields: Computer Science Computer Vision; Machine Learning Computational Advertising
- Workplaces: Microsoft Research India Indian Institute of Technology Delhi; MSRI University of California, Berkeley
- Thesis: Statistical approaches to texture classification (2004)
- Doctoral advisor: Andrew Zisserman
- Website: http://manikvarma.org/

Manik Varma is an Indian computer scientist and a Distinguished Scientist and Vice President at Microsoft Research India. He has an adjunct professor position at the Indian Institute of Technology Delhi.

== Education ==
He completed his undergraduate degree in Physics from St. Stephen’s College, Delhi. He was a Rhodes Scholar and earned his PhD from the University of Oxford under the guidance of Andrew Zisserman working on Texture Classification in Computer Vision. He also held a post-doctoral fellowship at the Mathematical Sciences Research Institute, Berkeley before joining Microsoft Research.

== Career ==
He conducts research in the fields of Machine Learning, Artificial Intelligence and Information Retrieval. In 2013, he started and popularized a new area in machine learning called Extreme Classification (also known as Extreme Multi-label Classification). Extreme Classification focuses on Multi-Label Classification at the scale of millions of labels and helps rethink traditional problems of ranking and recommendation. Extreme Classification is thriving in both academia and industry with product integrations in Bing and Amazon. Manik Varma along with his colleagues at MSR India also proposed another paradigm in machine learning called Edge Machine Learning to enable machine learning predictions on tiny IoT devices with as little as 2 KB of RAM assisting in low-energy, low-latency and privacy preserving applications of AI. In the past, he worked on statistical approaches to texture classification, object detection, multiple kernel learning and ranking.

== Recognition ==
He was awarded the Shanti Swarup Bhatnagar Prize for Science and Technology for his contributions to Engineering Sciences in 2019. His research works won the WSDM Best Paper award and BuildSys Best Paper Runner-Up award in 2019. The following year, he became a laureate of the Asian Scientist 100 by the Asian Scientist. He has been elected a Fellow of the Association for Computing Machinery, the Indian National Science Academy and the Indian National Academy of Engineering. He has also held a Visiting Miller Professorship at the University of California, Berkeley. He is associate editor-in-chief for the IEEE Transactions on Pattern Analysis and Machine Intelligence.
