= Kusum Ailawadi =

American economist

- Born: Kusum Lata Ailawadi
- Education: Delhi University (BS); Indian Institute of Management (MBA); University of Virginia (PhD)
- Occupations: Economist; Professor

Kusum Lata Ailawadi is an American economist. She is currently the Charles Jordan 1911 TU'12 Professor of Marketing at Tuck School of Business, Dartmouth College.

== Education ==
- B.Sc. in physics (Honors), St. Stephen's College, Delhi University, 1982
- M.B.A., Indian Institute of Management, 1984
- Ph.D. in marketing, University of Virginia Darden School of Business, 1991
