= Dinesh Dayal =

Dinesh Dayal is the current executive director and Chief Operating Officer at L'Oréal India.

Dayal joined the L’Oréal Group in 1984 in France where he began his career as a Management Trainee and held numerous roles in finance, marketing and operations. Subsequently, he was put in charge of expanding the L’Oréal business in South Asia. In 1990, he came to India as marketing director to set up the India business for L’Oréal in association with an Indian partner.

In 1994, he played a key role in establishing L’Oréal India as a 100% subsidiary of the L’Oréal Group and in 2000 he was appointed as Chief Operating Officer. He was also Director of L’Oréal's Luxury Products Division during its start up phase. He has launched brands such as Lancôme, Kiehl's, Giorgio Armani, Ralph Lauren and Diesel in India. He is also a member of the company's board of directors in India. He has had a stint as GM – Finance and Operations of L’Oréal's Thailand operations.

Dayal is a Physics graduate from St. Stephen's College (New Delhi) and has an MBA degree from INSEAD, France. An avid Scuba Diver; he is married and has two children.
