= Siva Athreya =

Indian mathematician (born 1971)

Siva Ramachandran Athreya
- Born: 1971 (age 54–55); India
- Education: St Stephen's College, Delhi; Delhi University; University of Washington
- Awards: Shanti Swarup Bhatnagar Prize for Science and Technology
- Scientific career
- Fields: Probability theory
- Workplaces: Indian Statistical Institute, Bangalore, Tata Institute of Fundamental Research, Mumbai.
- Doctoral advisor: Krzysztof Burdzy

Siva Ramachandran Athreya (born 1971) is an Indian probability theorist specialising in statistical physics and population biology.

He graduated in mathematics from St Stephen's College, Delhi, went to the Indian Statistical Institute in Kolkata and Bangalore where he completed his master's, and obtained his PhD degree from the University of Washington in 1998 under the supervision of Krzysztof Burdzy. He was awarded the Shanti Swarup Bhatnagar Prize for Science and Technology in 2012, the highest science award in India, in the mathematical sciences category.

He has co-written the book, "Probability and Statistics with Examples using R" (along with Deepayan Sarkar and Steve Tanner).
