= Hitendra Wadhwa =

Indian-American entrepreneur, educator and speaker

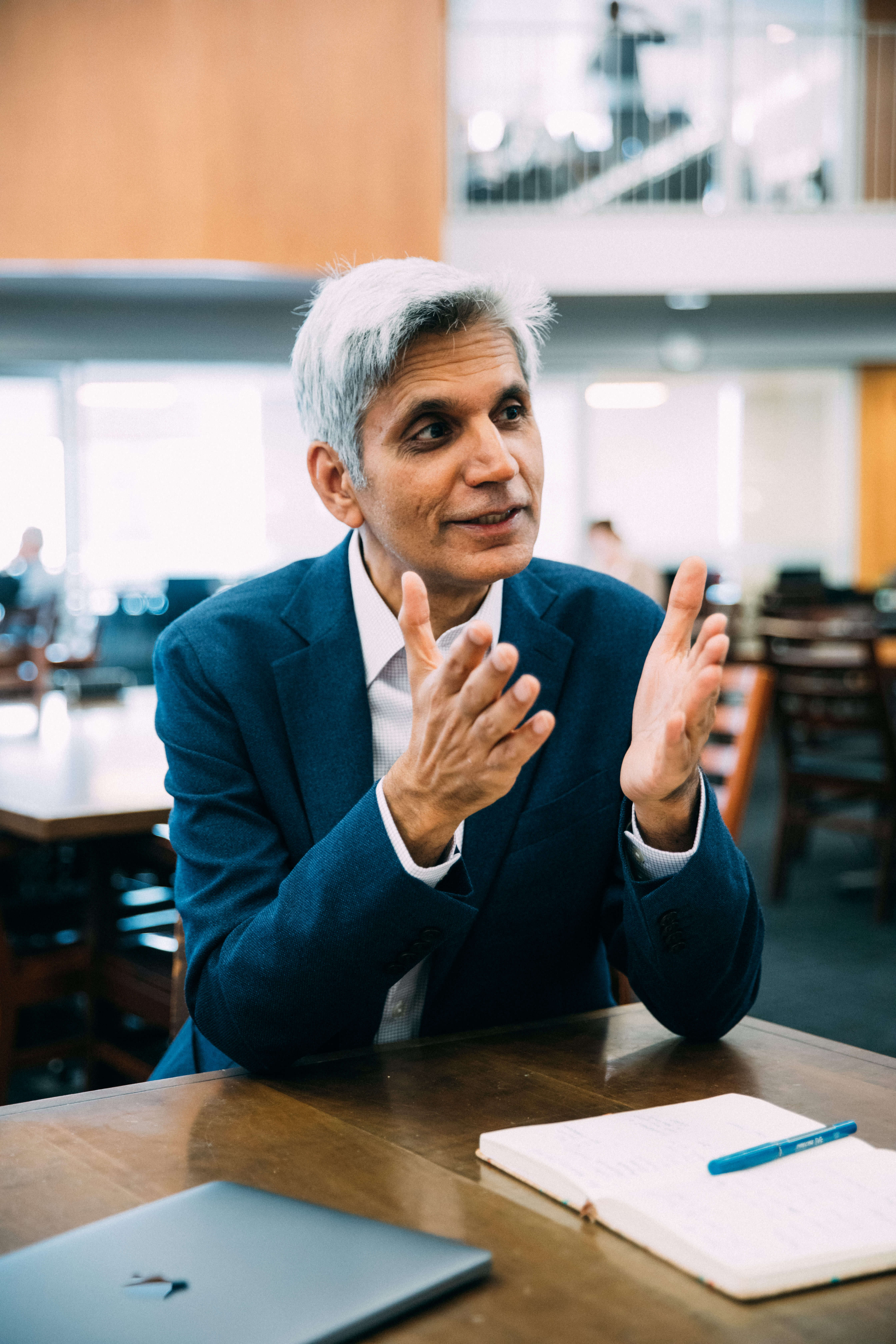
- Born: Hitendra Kumar Wadhwa; January 25, 1967 (age 59); Chandigarh, India
- Occupations: Businessman, educator
- Years active: 2004–present

Academic background
- Education: St. Stephen's College; Delhi University (B.A.); MIT (MBA), (PhD)
- Website: www.hitendra.com www.mentora.institute

Hitendra Wadhwa (born January 25, 1967) is an Indian-American businessman and educator. Wadhwa is currently a professor at Columbia Business School. He is the founder of the Mentora Institute.

== Early life and education ==
Wadhwa was born in Chandigarh, India, to Puran Chand Wadhwa and Nirmal (née Sarup).

Wadhwa received a bachelor's degree in mathematics from St. Stephens College, University of Delhi in 1988. He then received an M.B.A. and a Ph.D. in management science from Sloan School of Management at Massachusetts Institute of Technology (MIT) by 1996. Wadhwa’s doctoral research focused on optimizing price decisions for retail products with seasonal demand patterns.

== Career ==
Wadhwa became a consultant at McKinsey & Company, a global management consulting firm, in 1996. In 1999, after raising $10 million in venture capital, he founded Paramark, a marketing optimization technology startup in Silicon Valley. The company was acquired by NewWorldIQ in 2002. Wadhwa also founded a consulting firm, Delphinity, in 2002, which through a series of mergers became Mentora Institute.

Wadhwa first began teaching as a PhD. student at MIT in the 1990s. From 2004-2006, he served as an adjunct professor in Marketing at Wharton School of the University of Pennsylvania.

Wadhwa became a professor at Columbia Business School in 2006. In 2007, Wadhwa oversaw Columbia Business School’s alliance with the Indian Institute of Management Ahmedabad.

=== Mentora Institute ===
In 2011, Wadhwa launched the Mentora Institute to provide in-person and online leadership training and coaching for corporate executives. Teachings at the Mentora Institute are largely based on Wadhwa’s “Inner Mastery, Outer Impact” model originally developed at Columbia Business School. Wadhwa and the Mentora Institute launched the Mentora Foundation in 2021.

=== Publications ===
Wadhwa's book, Inner Mastery, Outer Impact was released on June 7, 2022.
