= Sridevi: The Eternal Screen Goddess =

2019 biography by Satyarth Nayak

- Author: Satyarth Nayak
- Language: English
- Subject: Sridevi
- Genre: Biography
- Published: 22 December 2019
- Publisher: Random House
- Publication place: India
- Pages: 296
- ISBN: 978-0-670-09267-3
- OCLC: 1138654065

Sridevi: The Eternal Screen Goddess is a biography by author and screenwriter Satyarth Nayak that chronicles the life and career of Indian actress Sridevi. Consisting of ten chapters, it describes her birth in 1963 in Egmore, her acting career in both the North and South Indian film industries, her marriage in 1996 to the film producer Boney Kapoor, with whom she has two daughters, and her death by accidental drowning in 2018. Published by Random House on 16 December 2019, the book was a success both commercially and critically, and reviewers commended it for the writing and comprehensiveness.

After authoring the mystery novel The Emperor's Riddles (2014) and scripting the historical television series Porus (2017–2018), Nayak wanted to experiment in writing a biography. 2017 was the year of Sridevi's 300th film, Mom; the news of the milestone aroused him to choose the actress as his next subject. Discussion of the book was started the same year, but writing started in mid-2018—following her death in February 2018—and was finished in around 1 1/2 years. In research, Nayak used his personal collection of film magazines and interviewed approximately 70 people, including her family members, her contemporaries and her friends.

== Summary ==
Sridevi was born on 13 August 1963 in Egmore. She got her first film role in the Tamil-language film Thunaivan (1969), portraying the Hindu God Kartikeya. She then appeared in more South Indian films, with her Malayalam and Telugu debuts Kumara Sambhavam (1969) and Maa Nanna Nirdoshi (1970), respectively. In Bollywood, she made her debut with Rani Mera Naam (1972), and followed it by a debut in the Kannada cinema with Bhakta Kumbara. The book also covers her commercially and critically successful films such as Moondru Mudichu (1976), 16 Vayathinile (1977), Sigappu Rojakkal (1978), Sadma (1983), Mr. India (1987), Chandni (1989), ChaalBaaz (1989), Kshana Kshanam (1991), and Lamhe (1991). In 1996, she married the film producer Boney Kapoor, with whom she has two children (including Jahnvi). After having children, Sridevi took a sabbatical from full-time acting. She had her comeback in English Vinglish (2012) and her last starring role came with Mom (2017). The book also details her death by accidental drowning on 24 February 2018.

== Background and writing ==
"Such was her stardom that she towered above her male co-stars and became the 'hero' of her films ... Her legacy spans fifty years and five languages and yet there was no book chronicling these ... I guess Sridevi's massive body of work was intimidating for most writers and I glad my book got to celebrate the female megastar."

— Satyarth Nayak on Sridevi

2017 marked the release of Sridevi's 300th film, the crime thriller Mom, for which she won her only Best Actress trophy at the National Film Awards. At that time, the author Satyarth Nayak had left Mumbai for Delhi and planned to explore a new genre for his next project, having written the mystery novel The Emperor's Riddles (2014) and scripted the historical television series Porus (2017–2018). The news of her milestone aroused Nayak to write about the actress. Calling himself an "ardent admirer" of Sridevi, whom he described as "a true pan-Indian megastar", Nayak's first encounter with Sridevi happened in 2012, while she was promoting for her comeback film, English Vinglish in Delhi, and had become an unforgettable experience for him.

Nayak was surprised to learn there were no biographies on her written at the time, and considered writing it would be a "blissful experience" for him. In 2017, he met her husband, Boney Kapoor, to discuss her biography. Coinciding with Jahnvi's signing of her debut film, Dhadak (2018), Sridevi notified him to start the project after the film was released. However, her sudden death in February 2018 changed his mind. Nayak recounted that he was initially ready to remove the "Sridevi Book" folder from his laptop until his friend texted him to keep the ideas, as her death meant the book would have a last chapter. He added, "While the initial idea of this book had been discussed with her and Boney sir, post her untimely demise, it's now taken the shape and form of a tribute to her inspiring cinematic journey. I am grateful to both Boney sir and Penguin for turning my vision into reality."

The writing of the book, originally titled Sridevi: Girl Woman Superstar, started in mid-2018 and was finished in 1 1/2 years. Nayak revealed that Kapoor was his huge supporter throughout the process and helped him to get access to anyone ready to interview. Nayak conducted meetings with over 70 people, including Sridevi's film contemporaries, her friends, her family members, and those who were present in Dubai, where she died. He stated he tried watching Sridevi's films as many as he could to "ensure a comprehensive documentation of her journey." In research, he used his personal collection of film magazines from the 1980s and 1990s, which contain her interviews from various stages of her career, and considered them "her voice in [the] book." Kapoor recommended Kajol to write the foreword, to which Nayak agreed. According to Nayak, the foreword needed to be written by a younger individual who works in the Indian film industry to give comprehension of how Sridevi being her inspiration, and Kajol fit the requirements.

== Release and reception ==
Sridevi: The Eternal Screen Goddess was published by Random House on 16 December 2019 on hardcover, and was declared a commercial success. Two more versions, on Amazon Kindle and audiobook, were released on 20 December that year and 12 February 2021, respectively. Upon release, the book has generated widespread acclaim from critics, who generally praise Nayak's writing and its comprehensiveness. Priyanka Bhadani of The Week, referring to the book as a "convincing retelling," complimented his effort in researching for it and concluded the review by saying, "even if the tone of the book is adulatory to an extent, it is a sincere effort in putting together the life of an actor who remained an enigma till the end." Writing for the Khaleej Times, Sadiq Saleem described it as an "eye-opening book," calling it "no less than a treasure for any cine-goer."

The Hindu's Ramya Kannan wrote that the book is more like a hagiography than a biography. Reviewing ambivalently the book for India Today, Jai Arjun Singh found Nayak's writing repetitive when starting his sentences by words such as, "Watch how..." Singh criticised his selectiveness in examining her performances, claiming that Nayak avoided those that have more negative reviews. The Times of India believed his journalistic career contributed with giving him enough insights about Sridevi, and Priyanka Chandani of The Asian Age said that it is full of her anecdotes. In the words of Gautam Chintamani from Firstpost, "... the actor's all-round brilliance is meticulously encapsulated, bringing forth episodes from her life that reveal a great deal about the person she was." Mid-Day's Mayank Shekhar called the book well-researched and "entirely fan-zoned."

== Publication history ==
Region	Release date	Format	Publisher	Ref.
India	16 December 2019	Hardcover	Random House	
India	20 December 2019	Amazon Kindle	Random House	
India	12 February 2021	Audiobook	Random House	

== Sources ==
- "65th National Film Awards" (PDF). dff.nic.in (Press release). Directorate of Film Festivals. p. 21. Archived from the original (PDF) on 6 June 2017.
- Bhadani, Priyanka (21 January 2020). "Decoding an enigma". The Week. Archived from the original on 12 July 2020.
- Bhandari, Kabir Singh (5 April 2020). "Sridevi, the Eternal Screen Goddess and 'female' Bachchan who fought for equality in Bollywood". Hindustan Times. Archived from the original on 30 December 2021.
- Chandani, Priyanka (21 January 2020). "Decoding Sridevi". The Asian Age. Archived from the original on 12 August 2020.
- Chhibber, Mini Anthikad (22 April 2020). "Satyarth Nayak book on Sridevi explores the actor's career". The Hindu. Archived from the original on 7 May 2020.
- Chintamani, Gautam (7 February 2020). "Adulatory but insightful, Satyarth Nayak's biography of Sridevi goes deep into the world of the late superstar". Firstpost. Archived from the original on 27 April 2021.
- Chopra, Yashna (2 December 2019). "Deepika Padukone's ivory Anamika Khanna sari is perfect for a day wedding". Vogue India. Archived from the original on 21 April 2021.
- Gupta, Joydeep Sen (4 February 2021). "'Some got emotional when speaking about Sridevi': Satyarth Nayak". Khaleej Times. Archived from the original on 31 December 2021.
- Kannan, Ramya (14 March 2020). "'Sridevi, the Eternal Screen Goddess' review: Chronicle of a distant life". The Hindu. Archived from the original on 23 June 2020.
- "Micro review: 'Sridevi: The Eternal Screen Goddess' by Satyarth Nayak". The Times of India. 4 January 2020. Archived from the original on 6 April 2020.
- Nayak, Satyarth (16 December 2019). Sridevi: The Eternal Screen Goddess. Random House. ISBN 978-0-670-09267-3.
- Nayak, Satyarth (20 December 2019). Sridevi: The Eternal Screen Goddess. Random House. ASIN B082P2X26X.
- Nayak, Satyarth (12 February 2021). Sridevi: The Eternal Screen Goddess. Random House. ASIN B08W8M9SS2.
- Nayak, Satyarth (3 May 2020). "Sridevi of many parts". Hindustan Times. Archived from the original on 4 October 2021.
- Raiyani, Pria (18 February 2020). Chawla, Saurabh (ed.). "Blockbuster biographer: Satyarth Nayak". Storizen. Vol. 8, no. 47. pp. 8–17.
- Radhakrishnan, Manjusha (4 February 2021). "Bollywood film icon Sridevi's life and legacy decoded in new book". Gulf News. Archived from the original on 24 February 2021.
- Roy, Lachmi Deb (23 December 2019). "Satyarth Nayak on his book, 'The Eternal Screen Goddess', a novel based on the legendary actress, Sridevi". Outlook. Archived from the original on 24 December 2019.
- Roy, Priyanka (20 March 2020). "Author Satyarth Nayak documents everything that made Sridevi 'eternal'". The Telegraph. Archived from the original on 31 December 2021.
- Saleem, Sadiq (25 February 2020). "Sridevi: The Cinderella whose clock struck twelve too soon". Khaleej Times. Archived from the original on 31 December 2021.
- Shekhar, Mayank (26 February 2020). "Mystique that lives on still". Mid-Day. Mumbai, India. Archived from the original on 26 February 2020.
- Singh, Jai Arjun (10 June 2020). "Short review – Sridevi: The Eternal Screen Goddess". Jabberwock. Archived from the original on 8 May 2021.
