= Vikram Talwar =

Indian businessman

Vikram Talwar is an Indian businessman who co-founded EXL Service.

== Biography ==
In 1970, Talwar obtained his MBA from the Indian Institute of Management, Ahmedabad, India. At the age of 25, he migrated to San Francisco, United States, and worked for Bank of America in various capacities in nine Asian countries, including as a Country Manager in India from 1970 to 1996. In 1991, he was among the youngest senior Vice Presidents of the bank.

After 26 years of service with the bank, Talwar worked as chief executive officer and managing director at Ernst & Young in India from 1998 to 1999. He quit Ernst & Young to start his own firm, Exl Service Holdings, Inc., with Rohit Kapoor, a colleague from Bank of America in April 1999.

Talwar served Exl in various capacities—as a Chief Executive Officer from April 1999; as Chief Executive Officer and Vice Chairman of company's board of directors from November 2002 to April 2008; as Executive Chairman from May 2008 to April 2011; and as a Chairman from April 2011 to February 2014. He retired on 5 May 2014.

In an interview to Sudhir Chowdhary, a The Financial Express correspondent, he said "one is never too old to embark on a new adventure in life," and "Life is never perfect. You make plans, they have to be changed. But you keep moving, keep flowing along. I myself am trying to figure out how to reinvent myself from next month onwards".
