= The Emperor's Riddles =

2014 novel by Satyarth Nayak

- Author: Satyarth Nayak
- Cover artist: Sonali Lal
- Language: English
- Genre: mystery, thriller
- Publisher: Amaryllis
- Publication date: February 2014
- Publication place: India
- Media type: Print (Paperback)
- Pages: 406
- ISBN: 9381506450

The Emperor's Riddles is a mystery thriller debut novel by Indian author Satyarth Nayak. The novel consists of a present-day trail of cryptic riddles scattered across India that must be solved one by one to unveil an ancient Indian secret. This journey plays out in the context of an esoteric legend involving one of the most iconic Emperors of the history of India. The book was first released at the New Delhi World Book Fair in February 2014. It turned out to be a bestselling thriller with the media calling it "a hit with young readers".

== Plot synopsis ==
The novel opens with the bizarre murder of historian Ram Mathur at the Ganga ghat in Varanasi. As his daughter Sia, her close friend Om Patnaik, and TV producer Jasodhara investigate the killing, they find a series of cryptic riddles scattered across the country that they must crack one by one to reach a final enigma.

Meanwhile, Chief Officer Parag Suri and journalist Alia Irani are chasing the killer branded as "Scorpion" by the media due to his choice of weapon, a poisoned syringe. At the same time a holy Buddhist Bhikkhu urges his young Samanera Tathagata to make an important journey that promises to alter his life.

Parallel to this is a second storyline which tells the story of the life of a young prince in Ancient India who becomes one of the most celebrated Emperors in history, and who envisions a secret project which could affect the entire world.

== Characters ==
- Om Patnaik – esoteric writer and family friend who is called upon the event of Ram Mathur's murder and joins his daughter Sia to crack the cryptic riddles and solve the mystery
- Sia Mathur – daughter of murdered historian Ram Mathur who joins Om Patnaik on the trail of riddles towards the final revelation
- Ram Mathur – historian in Sarnath and Sia's father who is brutally murdered
- Jasodhara – Television documentarian who assists Om and Sia in solving the mysterious riddles and penetrate the mystery
- Parag Suri – Chief Inspector investigating Mathur's murder and similar serial murders afoot
- Alia Irani – journalist who joins Suri in tracking the killer and solving the mystery
- Tathagata – Buddhist Samanera who walks the trail to see the 'Sights'
- Bhikkhu – the Buddhist monk who directs Tathagata
- The Emperor – the man at the heart of the legend

== Development and publication ==
The idea for The Emperor's Riddles was born out of a random Internet search by Nayak after reading the Dan Brown thriller Angels & Demons to find out if there was something similarly esoteric and mysterious hidden in the history of India. The surfing yielded an obscure but fascinating conspiracy theory involving one of the greatest Emperors of ancient India. Nayak was intrigued by the Emperor's legend and the imperial secret believed to be still alive and functioning and decided to capture this story. The first draft took about six months and was ready in 2011. The manuscript was accepted by Red Ink Literary Agency and subsequently underwent another round of editing. Nayak received publishing offers from Rupa & Co. and Amaryllis and he eventually signed the deal with Amaryllis in 2012. The book was first released at the New Delhi World Book Fair in February 2014.

== Themes ==
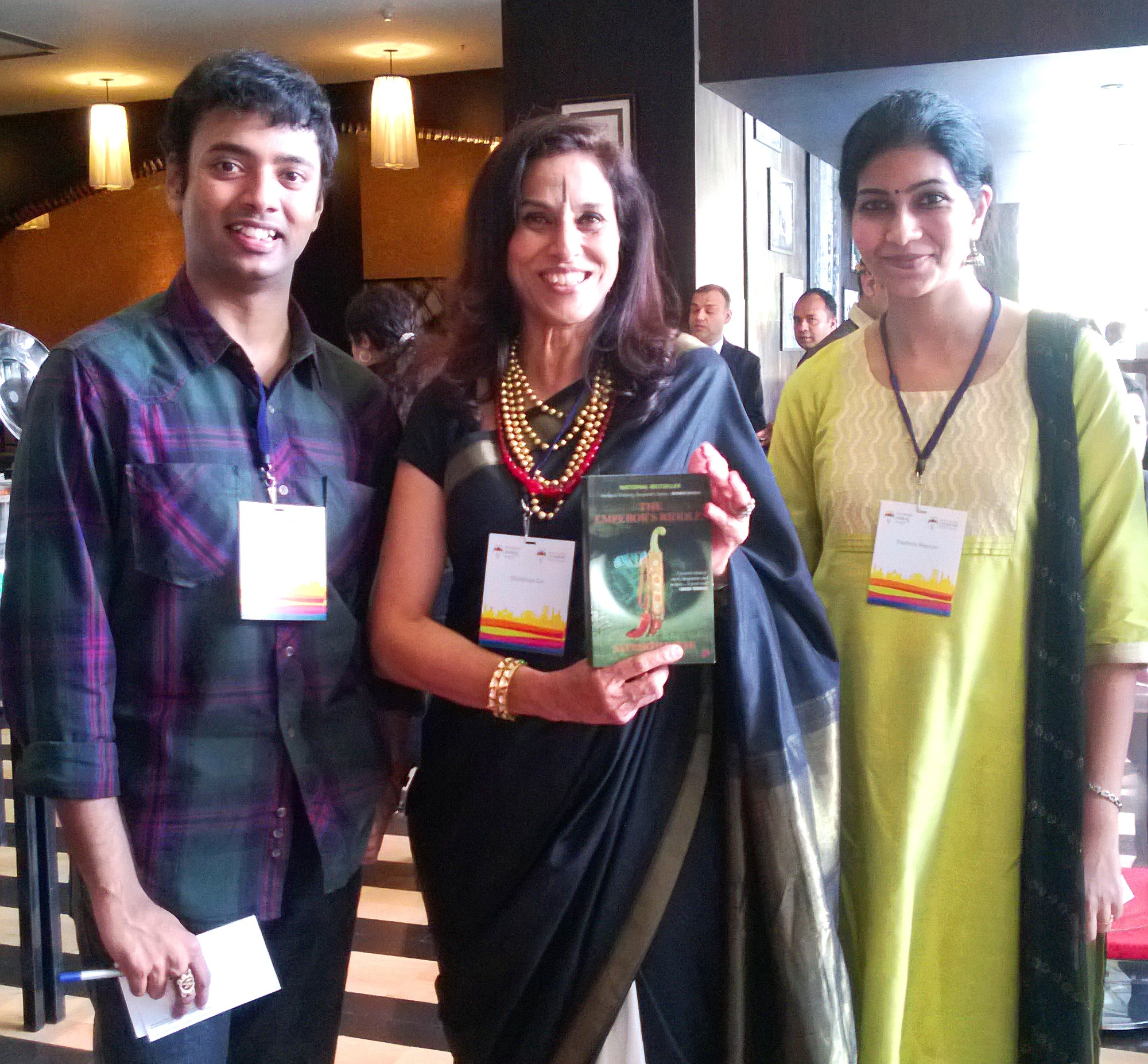
Satyarth Nayak with Shobha De at Bangalore Lit Fest 2014

The human quest for answers is the central theme of the book. The characters are on a personal quest and the final destination may or may not be as per their expectations. More than the answers, it's the pursuit itself that matters. Where one ends, another begins. The riddles in the thriller based on Indian history and mythology also become successively complicated and difficult to heighten the mystery. They also symbolize the everlasting human quest for truth.

Buddhism plays an important role in the book. This is probably one of the first Indian thrillers to predominantly use Buddhist mythology, philosophy and iconography. Structurally the book is divided into three sections titled Buddham, Dhammam and Sangham based on the concept of Triratna.

Ancient science and technology is also a crucial theme. The book explores the great scientific advancement made in Ancient India investigating the technological literature and artifacts believed to be far more futuristic than present day gizmos. The Book Geeks review states that "Satyarth Nayak has taken our rich ancient knowledge of science and converted it into a historical fiction".

== Reception ==
The Emperor's Riddles was met with a positive response. The book earned acclaim from other mystery writers, with Amish Tripathi calling it "a fantastic blend of myth, imagination and mystery", and Ashwin Sanghi describing it as "Intelligent, Intriguing, Imaginative, Intense". While Times of India called it a "history meets mystery", Hindustan Times called it "a gripping tale of intrigue" and lauded the book for its "taut narration and interesting climax". HT Brunch magazine included the book in its Summer Reading List of 2014, calling it "a celebration of our great Indian civilisation and its scientific genius" and recommending it for those who like "riddles and cool mythological references". Yahoo praised the book as an "extraordinary tale of riddles". The Hindu described it as a "concoction of mystery, thriller, legend" and a "national bestseller" while The Pioneer lauded how "history is being explored by the new-age writers like never before". The New Indian Express declared the thriller "a hit with young readers" and said it "opened a completely different avenue for budding writers to experiment with". While English Vinglish director Gauri Shinde called the book "an acclaimed thriller" via Twitter, the SpectralHues book review said the thriller's "shock twist towards the end makes you feel so ignorant" and that "a Christopher Nolan of the West or our very own Anurag Kashyap can pretty well give it a thought to bring The Emperor’s Riddles to life on screen".

== Comparisons with Dan Brown ==
Since its release, The Emperor's Riddles has been likened to the mystery novels of Dan Brown. In an interview with Times of India, Nayak stated that "the fact that the book's earning comparisons with Dan Brown is overwhelming" and "If Brown has codes, my book has riddles."

== Film adaptation ==
The novel has received an interest from a Bollywood scriptwriter to convert it into a film. Nayak has stated that he will also be collaborating on the screenplay.

== Awards ==
- Shri Award for Men Achievers (Literature) 2016

== See also ==
- The Mahabharata Secret
- A Short Film based on Nine Unknown Men
