= Satyarth Nayak =

Indian author and screenwriter (born 1981)

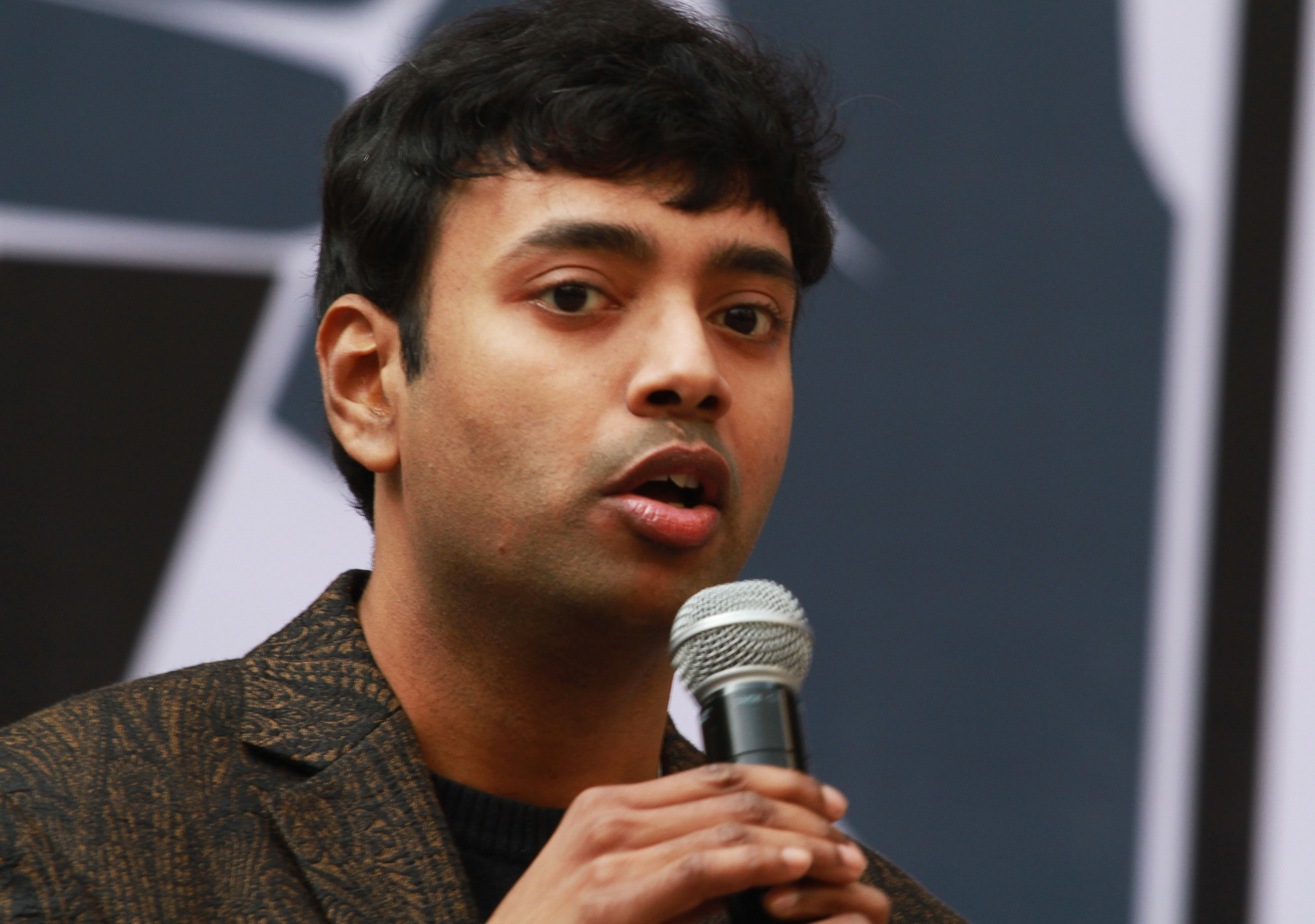
- Nayak in 2015
- Born: 29 October 1981 (age 44); Cuttack, Odisha, India
- Occupations: Author, screenwriter
- Writing career
- Notable works: The Emperor's Riddles; Sridevi: The Eternal Screen Goddess; Porus

Satyarth Nayak (born 29 October 1981) is an Indian author and screenwriter known for his bestselling novel The Emperor's Riddles, authoring the biography of Sridevi and for scripting Sony's historical television epic Porus. The Emperor's Riddles was a thriller that the media called "a hit with young readers". Porus was one of the most expensive and acclaimed shows on Indian television. Satyarth's biography of screen Sridevi titled Sridevi: The Eternal Screen Goddess published in 2019 by Penguin Random House was highly praised. Nayak has been named one of the Top 51 Indian authors to follow on Facebook.

== As author ==
=== The Emperor's Riddles ===
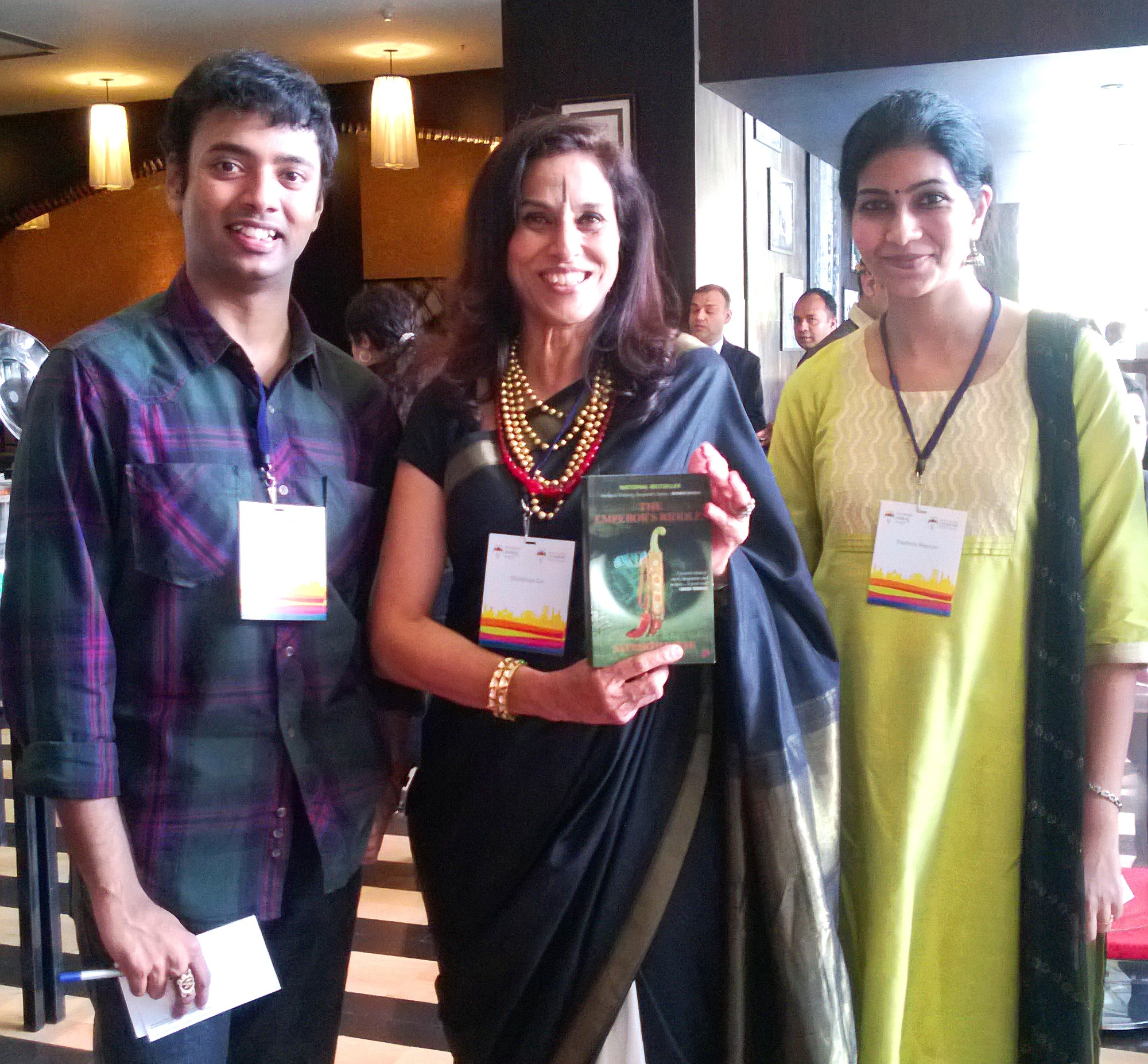
Satyarth with Shobha De at Bangalore Lit Fest 2014

The idea for The Emperor's Riddles was born out of a random Internet search by Nayak after reading the Dan Brown thriller Angels & Demons to find out if there was something similarly esoteric and mysterious hidden in the history of India. The yielded a conspiracy theory involving one of the greatest Emperors of ancient India. Nayak was intrigued by the Emperor's legend and the imperial secret believed to be still alive and functioning and decided to capture this story. The first draft took about six months and was ready in 2011. The manuscript was accepted by Red Ink Literary Agency and subsequently underwent another round of editing. The book was published by Amaryllis in 2012. The book was first released at the New Delhi World Book Fair in February 2014. The book was praised by other mystery writers, with Amish Tripathi calling it "a fantastic blend of myth, imagination and mystery", and Ashwin Sanghi describing it as "Intelligent, Intriguing, Imaginative, Intense". While The Times of India called it a "history meets mystery", Hindustan Times called it "a gripping tale of intrigue" and lauded the book for its "taut narration and interesting climax". HT Brunch magazine included the book in its Summer Reading List of 2014, calling it "a celebration of our great Indian civilisation and its scientific genius" and recommending it for those who like "riddles and cool mythological references". Yahoo praised the book as an "extraordinary tale of riddles". The Hindu described it as a "concoction of mystery, thriller, legend" and a "national bestseller" while The Pioneer lauded how "history is being explored by the new-age writers like never before". The New Indian Express declared the thriller "a hit with young readers" and said it "opened a completely different avenue for budding writers to experiment with". While English Vinglish director Gauri Shinde called the book "an acclaimed thriller" via Twitter, the SpectralHues book review said the thriller's "shock twist towards the end makes you feel so ignorant" and that "a Christopher Nolan of the West or our very own Anurag Kashyap can pretty well give it a thought to bring The Emperor's Riddles to life on screen". Since its release, The Emperor's Riddles has been likened to the mystery novels of Dan Brown. In an interview with The Times of India, Nayak stated that "the fact that the book's earning comparisons with Dan Brown is overwhelming" and "If Brown has codes, my book has riddles."

=== Venom ===
Venom also won positive reviews. Times of India said that "the pure imagination behind the tale is riveting and the different elements of contemporary India the author includes just makes it more than a mytho-fiction", and Free Press Journal said that the book "slowly (but positively) spreads its poisonous tentacles of a gripping thriller that keeps readers hooked while checking on Google for the mythology references. It's thrilling!"

=== Sridevi: The Eternal Screen Goddess ===
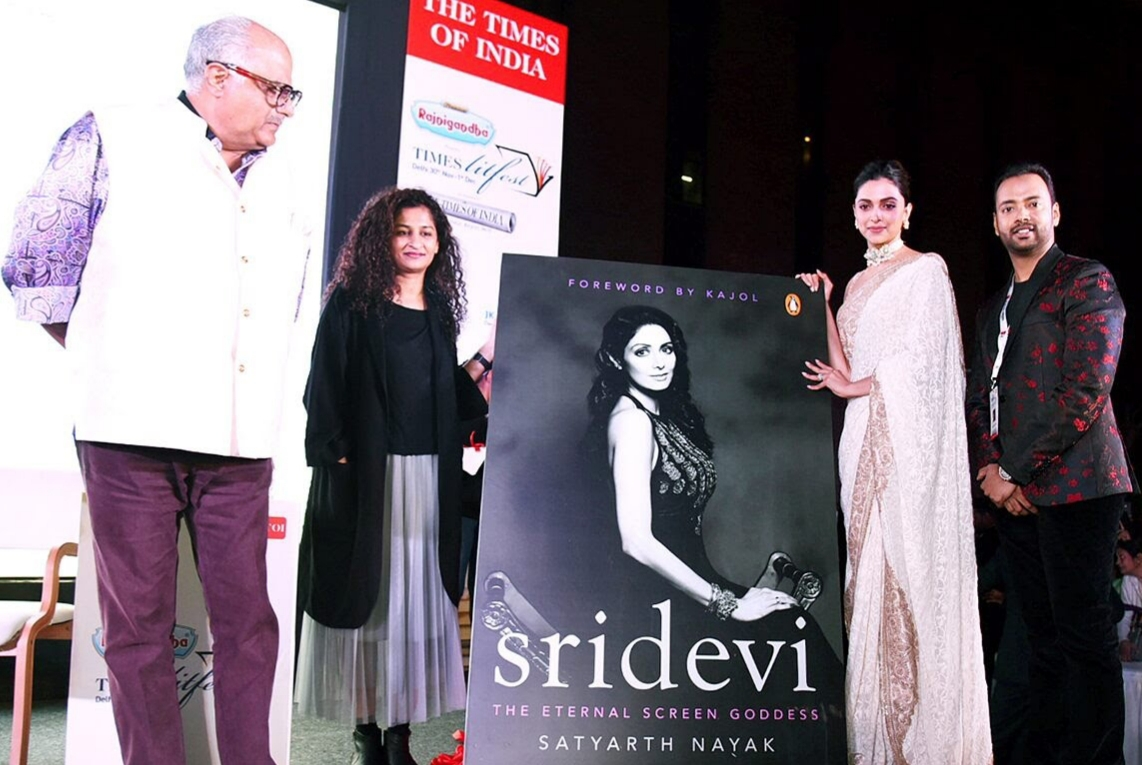
Delhi Launch

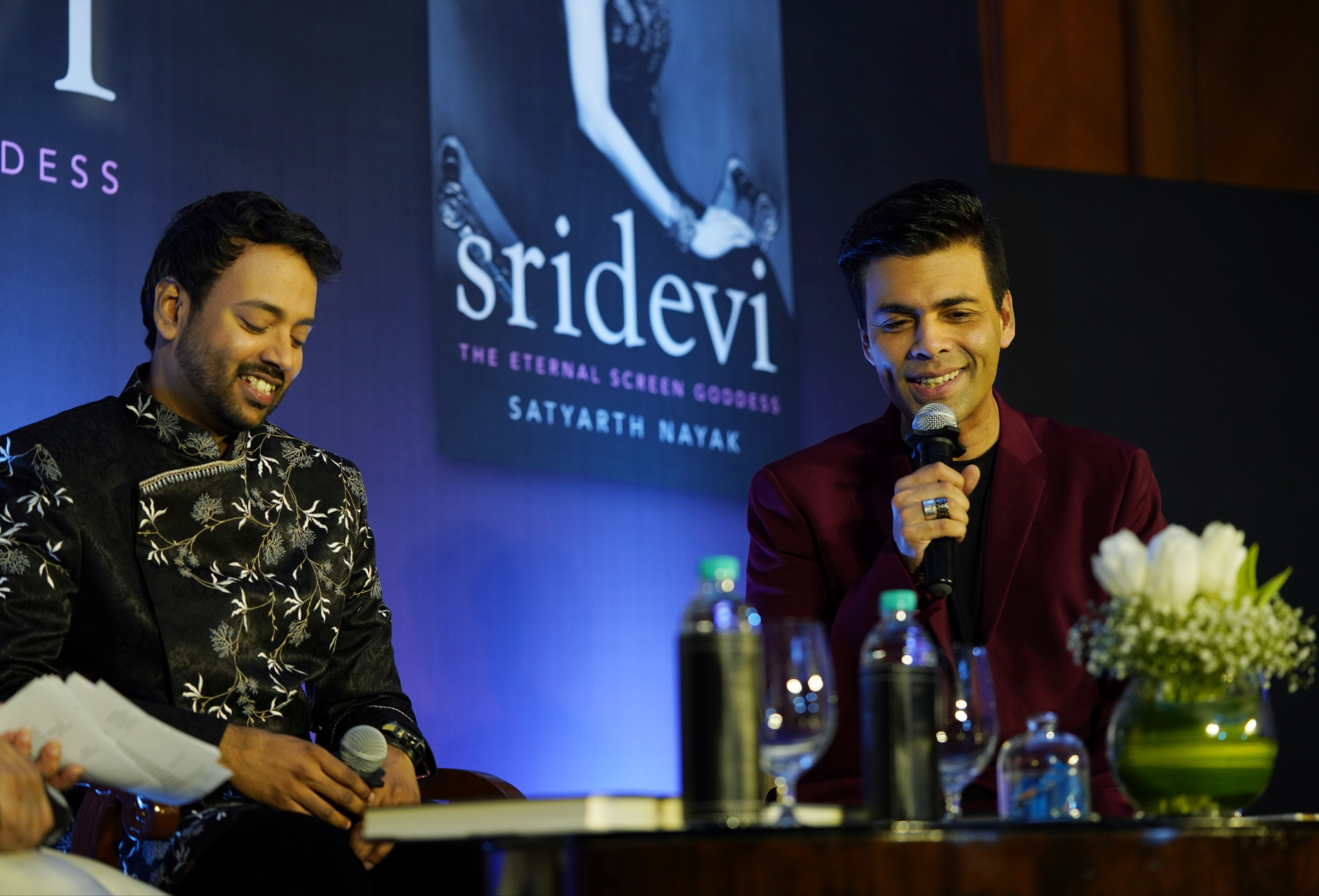
Satyarth Nayak with Karan Johar

In 2019, Nayak announced his first non-fiction book on India's superstar Sridevi. The book Sridevi: The Eternal Screen Goddess was published by Penguin Random House and backed by Boney Kapoor. The Times of India called it "a treat for any Bollywood fan" and The Hindu called it "an eminently readable account". India Today described it as "rooted in honest love for its subject", and The Week as "a convincing retelling of the actor's life". Mid-Day described it as "diligently researched, deeply felt". Vogue India called it "a rare insight into Sridevi" and Firstpost praised it as "that one work of literature one might seek out to decode Sridevi".

=== 100 Tales from the Puranas ===
In July 2020, Nayak announced his first book on Indian mythology titled 100 Tales from the Puranas to be published by Westland Press. Deepthi Talwar from Westland Press told the media "We're very excited about the collection that Satyarth has put together. He takes us through popular legends and lesser known stories from the Puranas, delving into the minds of several characters to psychoanalyse their actions." In October 2020, The Telegraph featured the book on their list of highly anticipated books of 2021 saying "Dabbling into Indian mythology this time, he promises to write stories from the Puranas that still find resonance in today's time and impart the wisdom that can find relevance in our lives. Deep research has always been the base of Nayak's books so one can hope that this time too, he will not disappoint." After Westland Press closed down in 2022, the book was then acquired by HarperCollins India who issued the statement that "We at Harper are excited to be publishing Satyarth's upcoming book based on the Puranas. The magnum opus will be a treat for fans of Indian mythology."

== As screenwriter ==
=== Porus ===
In 2017, Nayak joined Swastik Productions to write the screenplay for Porus based on the story of Porus (King of Pauravas) and Alexander The Great ( King of Macedonia). The show aired from 27 November 2017 to present on SET India. It is India's most expensive series with a budget of INR 500 crores (US$70 million). It became India's first Global-TV series and also first Indian series to reach Japan. It has been dubbed and subbed in many languages and is already sold to over 11 countries and 14 territories. In Sri Lanka, it airs on Sirasa TV, dubbed into Sinhala under the name Digvijaya. The rights to the drama have also been sold to Thailand, Malaysia, Cambodia, Myanmar, Laos, and Vietnam. It is also dubbed in Tamil as Maaveeran which currently airs on Sun Life channel, Sun TV network from October 2018 onwards. The Malayalam version is titled Porus which currently airs on Surya TV from January 2019.

== Awards ==
- Youth Inspiration Award (Literature) 2017
- Shri Award for Men Achievers (Literature) 2016
