= Ram Charan filmography and awards =

Performances and awards of Indian actor

Ram Charan filmography
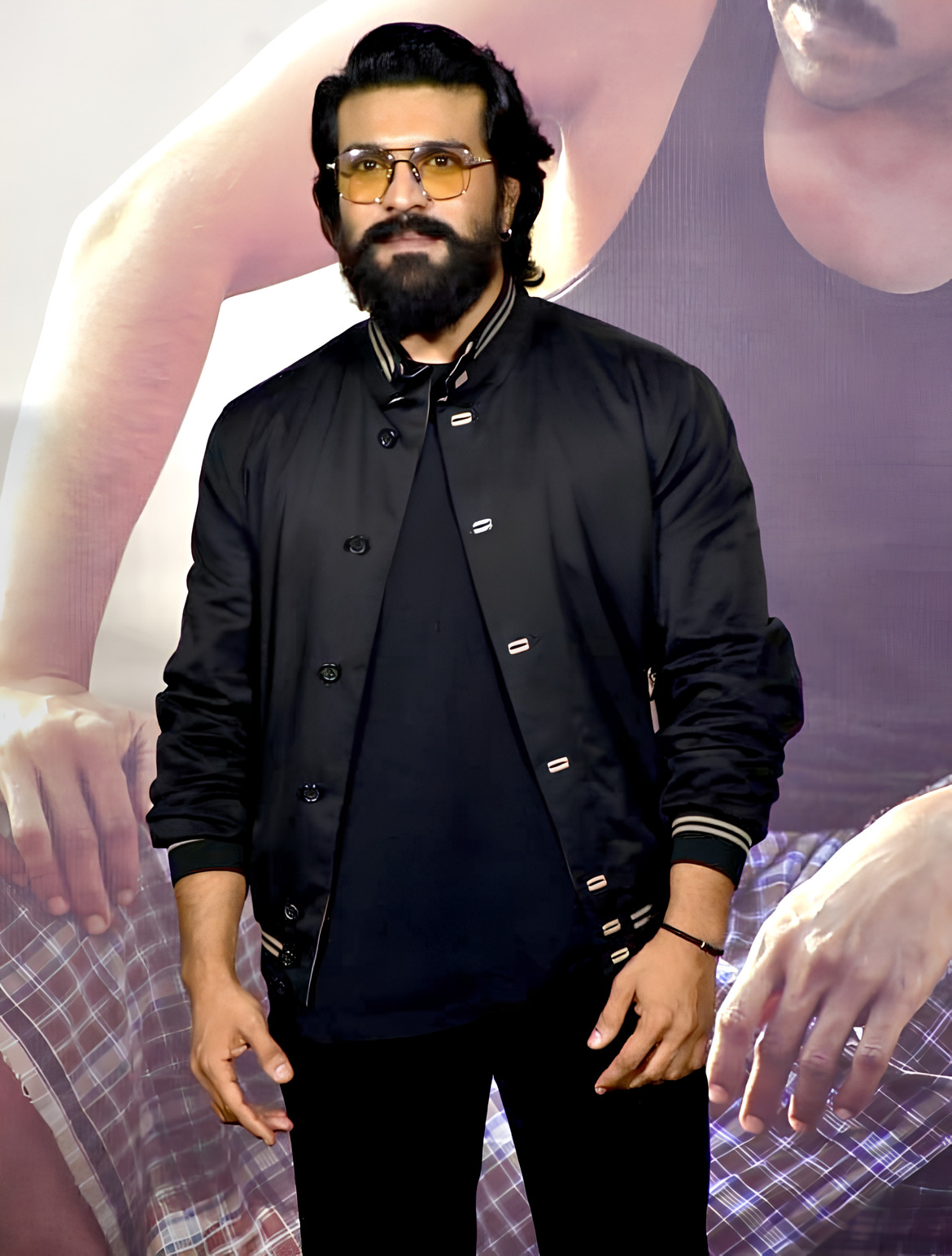
- Charan in 2024
- Film: 17

Ram Charan is an Indian actor and producer who works predominantly in Telugu cinema. He is one of the highest paid south Indian actors. He made his acting debut with Chirutha (2007), a box office hit, winning the Filmfare Award for Best Male Debut – South. He rose to prominence starring in S. S. Rajamouli's fantasy action film Magadheera (2009), the highest-grossing Telugu film of all time at the time, winning the Filmfare Award for Best Actor – Telugu. His notable works include Orange (2010), Racha (2012), Naayak (2013), Zanjeer (2013), a remake of the 1973 movie of the same name, Yevadu (2014), Govindudu Andarivadele (2014), and Dhruva (2016). Charan then starred in the blockbuster Rangasthalam (2018), winning his second Filmfare Award for Best Actor – Telugu. His career highest-grossing movie as a solo lead is Rangasthalam (2018). He also starred in commercially unsuccessful films like Vinaya Vidheya Rama (2019) and Game Changer (2025). He also starred as one of the leads in S. S. Rajamouli's blockbuster film RRR (2022) and made an extended cameo appearance in Acharya (2022).

In 2016, Charan launched his own production house Konidela Production Company, which has notably backed Khaidi No. 150 (2017) and Sye Raa Narasimha Reddy (2019).

== Film ==
=== As an actor ===
- Note: All films are in Telugu, unless otherwise noted.

Key
†	Denotes films that have not yet been released

Year	Title	Role	Notes	Ref.
2007	Chirutha	Charan		
2009	Magadheera	Kaala Bhairava / Harsha (Note: Charan performed dual roles in the film.)		
2010	Orange	Ram		
2012	Racha	Raj		
2013	Naayak	Charan "Cherry" / Siddharth Naayak		
2013	Zanjeer	ACP Vijay Khanna	Also shot in Hindi; Singer for "Mumbai Ke Hero" (Telugu version only)	
2014	Yevadu	Satya / Charan		
2014	Govindudu Andarivadele	Abhiram		
2015	Bruce Lee: The Fighter	Karthik / Bruce Lee (Note: Ram Charan played a single character with two or more names.)		
2016	Dhruva	ASP K. Dhruva IPS		
2017	Khaidi No. 150	Himself	Special appearance in the song "Ammadu Lets Do Kummudu"	
2018	Rangasthalam	Chelluboina Chitti Babu		
2019	Vinaya Vidheya Rama	Konidela Ram		
2022	RRR	Alluri Sitarama Raju		
2022	Acharya	Comrade Siddha		
2023	Kisi Ka Bhai Kisi Ki Jaan	Himself	Hindi film; Cameo appearance in the song "Yentamma"	
2025	Game Changer	Ram Nandan / Appanna		
2026	Peddi	Peddi		
TBA	Untitled RC17 film †	TBA		

=== As a producer ===
Year	Title	Ref.
2017	Khaidi No. 150	
2019	Sye Raa Narasimha Reddy	
2022	Godfather	
TBA	The India House †	

== Television ==
Year	Title	Role	Network	Notes	Ref.
2024	Modern Masters: S. S. Rajamouli	Himself	Netflix	Documentary film	
2024	RRR: Behind and Beyond	Himself	Netflix	Documentary film	

== Awards and nominations ==
Ram Charan awards and nominations
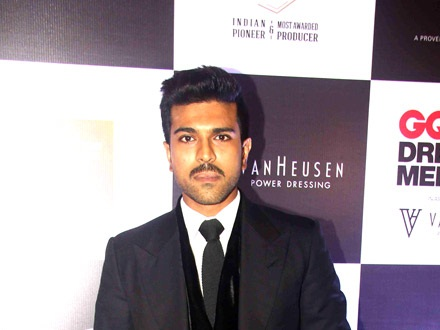
- Ram Charan at GQ India Awards 2016
Awards and nominations
Award	Wins	Nominations

Totals (Note: Certain award groups do not simply award one winner. They acknowledge several different recipients, have runners-up, and have third place. Since this is a specific recognition and is different from losing an award, runner-up mentions are considered wins in this award tally. For simplification and to avoid errors, each award in this list has been presumed to have had a prior nomination.)
- Wins: 13
- Nominations: 17

Year	Award	Category	Film	Result	Ref
2008	Nandi Awards	Special Jury Award	Chirutha	Won	
2010	Nandi Awards	Special Jury Award	Magadheera	Won	
2014	Zee Cine Awards	Best Male Debut	Zanjeer	Nominated	
2008	Filmfare Awards South	Best Male Debut – South	Chirutha	Won	
2010	Filmfare Awards South	Best Actor – Telugu	Magadheera	Won	
2012	Filmfare Awards South	Best Actor – Telugu	Racha	Nominated	
2013	Filmfare Awards South	Best Actor – Telugu	Naayak	Nominated	
2024	Filmfare Awards South	Best Actor – Telugu	RRR	Won	
2016	Filmfare Awards South	Best Actor – Telugu	Dhruva	Nominated	
2019	Filmfare Awards South	Best Actor – Telugu	Rangasthalam	Won	
2019	South Indian International Movie Awards	Best Actor (Telugu)	Rangasthalam	Won	
2010	Santosham Film Awards	Best Actor	Magadheera	Won	
2015	Santosham Film Awards	Best Actor	Govindudu Andarivadele	Won	
2016	Asiavision Awards	Youth Icon of India	—N/a	Won	
2010	CineMAA Awards	Best Actor – Male	Magadheera	Won	
2019	Zee Cine Awards Telugu	Best Actor in a Leading Role – Male	Rangasthalam	Won	
2023	Critics' Choice Super Awards	Best Actor in an Action Movie	RRR	Nominated	
2023	Filmfare Awards South	Best Actor in a Leading Role – Male	RRR	Won	
2023	South Indian International Movie Awards	Best Actor in a Leading Role – Male	RRR	Nominated	
