= Peddi =

2026 Indian film by Buchi Babu Sana

- Theatrical release poster
- Directed by: Buchi Babu Sana
- Written by: Buchi Babu Sana
- Produced by: Venkata Satish Kilaru; Ishan Saksena
- Starring: Ram Charan; Shiva Rajkumar; Janhvi Kapoor; Jagapathi Babu; Divyenndu
- Cinematography: R. Rathnavelu
- Edited by: Navin Nooli
- Music by: A. R. Rahman
- Production companies: Vriddhi Cinemas; IVY Entertainment
- Release date: 4 June 2026
- Running time: 189 minutes
- Country: India
- Language: Telugu
- Budget: ₹300−350 crore (Note: Attributed to multiple sources)
- Box office: ₹330–336.85 crore (Note: Peddi's reported worldwide grosses vary between ₹330 crore (Deccan Herald, Cinema Express) – ₹336.85 crore (Outlook India))

Peddi is a 2026 Indian Telugu-language sports action drama film written and directed by Buchi Babu Sana. Produced by Venkata Satish Kilaru under Vriddhi Cinemas and co-produced by Ishan Saksena under IVY Entertainment and presented by Mythri Movie Makers and Sukumar Writings, it stars Ram Charan in the titular role, alongside Shiva Rajkumar, Janhvi Kapoor and Jagapathi Babu.

The film was announced under the working title of RC16 in March 2024, with the official title being announced as Peddi in March 2025. Principal photography commenced in Mysuru on 22 November 2024, with filming taking place in Hyderabad, Colombo, Kanyakumari, and Pune. Filming concluded by the end of April 2026. The original score and soundtrack are composed by A. R. Rahman.

The film was released theatrically on 4 June 2026 in standard, IMAX, 4DX, D-Box, ScreenX, ICE, PXL, MX4D, Dolby Cinema, and EPIQ formats to mixed reviews, with praise for Ram Charan, Shiva Rajkumar, and Jagapathi Babu's performances and criticism for some scenes featuring Janhvi Kapoor, the screenplay, and the film's runtime. The film received mixed reviews from critics but was a commercial success at the box office and became the highest grossing Telugu film of 2026, however, it underperformed significantly in other pan-Indian regions and overseas markets.

== Plot ==
In 2016, a National Sports Ministry Official is reprimanded by the minister following India's poor performance at the Olympic Games. While touring a town in Andhra Pradesh, the official observes local youth demonstrating an exceptional dedication to athletics, all attributing their inspiration to an individual named Peddi. Intrigued, the official embarks on an arduous trek through forests and hills to reach a remote, nameless hilltop village to uncover Peddi's history.

Past: The narrative shifts to 1994 in a marginalized and undocumented tribal hamlet in the Vizianagaram region. The villagers face systemic social discrimination, economic exploitation, and violence from neighboring upper-caste landlords. Appalasoori, a resident of the hamlet, has spent three decades petitioning the government to have the village legally recognized, named, and granted a railway station to establish connectivity with the outside world. Peddi, another villager and Appalasoori's companion, works as an aata coolie (sports laborer) possessing unmatched cricketing skills. He participates in regional tournaments for wages and maintains an undefeated record. During this period, he develops a romantic relationship with Achiyamma, the daughter of a local politician. When Rambujji, the nephew of her father's political rival, attempts to publicly humiliate Achiyamma by disrobing her skirt, Peddi intervenes, leading to a violent altercation. In retaliation, Rambujji orchestrates Peddi's public humiliation during a local tournament, ensuring his defeat. Despite the loss, Peddi retains the admiration of the local public. Gournaidu, a veteran wrestler seeking to revive Vizianagaram's endangered traditional wrestling, recognizes Peddi's athletic potential and offers to train him, though Peddi initially declines.

The village suffers a severe setback when a child dies in the forest while the community is trekking back to work. A devastated Appalasoori presents his petitions to the local minister, only to be harshly rebuffed and humiliated. Driven to despair, Appalasoori commits suicide by stepping in front of a speeding train. Outraged by his death, Peddi and the villagers vandalize the railway tracks by setting them on fire, resulting in a brutal police intervention. Recognizing the systemic helplessness of his community, Peddi resolves to secure a legal identity for the village and approaches Gournaidu for training. Undergoing rigorous preparation, Peddi successfully advances through local and state-level wrestling competitions.

As he positions himself for a national victory, an envious rival, Veerabhadra inflicts a severe, career-threatening leg injury upon him. Despite the impairment, Peddi reaches the tournament semi-finals. However, Bhadra tells Ratan Sisodia's camp about him injuring Peddi's leg and to target his leg. Yet, in the semis, Peddi wins but faints. Upon awakening, he learns that the injury has rendered him permanently unfit for wrestling. Refusing a compensatory government desk job, Peddi separates from Achiyamma and travels to Delhi to meet the National Railways Minister. The minister dismisses his appeals, mocking his physical condition and labeling his injury an excuse.

Desperate to force a bureaucratic resolution, Peddi deliberately amputates his damaged leg, acquires a running blade prosthetic, and undergoes a grueling physical transition into a para-track athlete. In 1996, He enters and wins a national track race, using his post-match victory speech to publicize his village's lack of legal recognition and the ongoing hardships of his people. The broadcast is watched tearfully by his villagers, Achiyamma - who has publicly proclaimed herself his wife - and a reformed Rambujji, who was moved by Peddi's determination. Confronted with widespread public pressure, the central government officially recognizes the village and commissions a railway station. Although the government offers to name the station after him, Peddi requests that the village be renamed "Appalavalasa" in honor of Appalasoori. He returns home to a celebratory welcome, reconciling with his mother and Achiyamma.

Present: In the present day, the inspired government official resolves to implement a national initiative to identify and nurture grassroots sports talent in remote villages across India.

== Cast ==
- Ram Charan as Peddi
- Shiva Rajkumar as Gournaidu, Peddi's wrestling coach and mentor
- Janhvi Kapoor as Achiyamma, Peddi's love interest later wife
- Jagapathi Babu as Appalasoori
- Rao Ramesh as Subhadra Raju, Achiyamma's father
- Rajatava Dutta as a Police officer
- Tinnu Anand as Vishnukant Tiwari, Youth Affairs and Sports Minister
- Boman Irani as Kiran Singh Baiswal, a National Sports Ministry Official
- Ravi Kishan as Ranadheer Sisodia, Gournaidu's rival (Voice Dubbed by P. Ravi Shankar)
- Divyenndu as Ram Bujji
- Upendra Limaye as Phirangi, Villager Coolie
- John Vijay as Ammathalli
- Sooraj Pops as Kurumaiah, Peddi's friend
- Ravi Mariya as a Home Minister
- Zakir Hussain as Alok Kumar Mehta, Union Railway minister
- Rajesh Sharma as Indian Government Official
- Hareesh Peradi as MLA
- Raghu Babu as a Station Master
- VTV Ganesh as a Bank Manager
- Satya as Thulam, Peddi's friend
- Chitram Seenu as Ranga, Gournaidu's assistant
- Tarak Ponnappa as Veerabhadra, Gournaidu’s Wrestling player
- Rajeev Pillai as Ratan Sisodia, Randheer Sisodia's Son
- Viji Chandrasekhar as Gangamma, Peddi's mother
- Srikanth Iyengar as Bhaskar Rao, Ram Bujji's uncle
- Ajay Ghosh as Paidappa
- Aadukalam Naren as Sivakrishna Naidu
- Chammak Chandra as Ailu, Achiyamma's assistant
- Prabhas Sreenu as Cricket Commentator
- Kishore Kumar Poliemera as Wrestling Commentator
- Shibin Raghav as Thalari Ambrose, Fast bowler
- Naveen Neni as Loud Sesh, Photographer
- Mahesh Achanta as locomotive pilot
- Nandagopal as locomotive pilot
- Srinivas Vadlamani as Betting Man
- Balagam Sanjay as Keshava, Paidappa’s Wrestling player
- Viva Raghav as Achiyamma’s match
- Vishu Reddy as Bobbili, Ram bujji’s rival
- Trinadh Varma as Ram bujji’s gang member
- Yash Puri as Vimanam, Bobbili’s gang member
- Gopi Gavireddy as Bobbili’s gang member
- Giridhar Vajja as Selection Officer
- Shruti Haasan as Balla Adilakshmi, in item number the song "Hellallallo" (special appearance)

== Production ==
=== Development ===
In late-November 2022, Ram Charan confirmed his collaboration with Buchi Babu Sana for his next film. It was produced by Vriddhi Cinemas and Sukumar Writings, with Mythri Movie Makers serving as distributors. The film's crew and actors who were playing pivotal characters in the film were announced through individual publicity posters. Accordingly, R. Rathnavelu was announced as the cinematographer. In January 2024, A. R. Rahman was brought on board to compose the background score and music to the film. The production house scheduled auditions across Vizianagaram, Salur, Srikakulam, and Visakhapatnam to rope in additional talent. The project was officially launched by Chiranjeevi on 20 March 2024 under the working title RC16, described as a "rural, emotional and rustic journey." Charan underwent a physical transformation under fitness coach Shivoham Bhatt, and learned the Vizianagaram dialect for his role.

=== Casting ===
Ram Charan was announced as the main lead. Shiva Rajkumar confirmed joining the film in January 2024. Janhvi Kapoor was announced as the female lead on 6 March 2024. Jagapathi Babu and Divyenndu joined the cast in November 2024. Vijay Sethupathi was offered a role but declined it, choosing to pivot away from father-figure roles similar to his character in Sana's Uppena (2021). Boman Irani joined the cast in December 2025, and Shruti Haasan was roped in for a special song appearance in April 2026.

=== Filming ===
Principal photography commenced in Mysuru on 22 November 2024. The director posted his picture with the film's script in front of the Chamundeshwari Temple. Aalim Hakim was brought in to design multiple looks for Charan. Kapoor prepared for her character in Hyderabad through December 2024. Filming occurred at the Bhoot Bungalow in Hyderabad for ten days, and an intense action sequence was filmed near Moula Ali across five days in April 2025.

In May 2025, production designer Avinash Kolla and his team constructed a massive set replicating a 1980s coastal town in the outskirts of Hyderabad. By October 2025, around 60% of filming was done, including a romantic song shot in Sri Lanka. Additionally, a track titled "Chikiri" choreographed by Jani Master was filmed in Savalya Ghat near Pune. In December 2025, a crucial fight sequence choreographed by Sham Kaushal was executed at a steel factory in Hyderabad. Following a minor injury sustained by Charan during an action scene in March 2026, principal photography formally concluded at the end of April 2026.

== Music ==
The soundtrack and original score were composed by A. R. Rahman, who finished three tracks by March 2024. Global music distribution rights were acquired by T-Series for ₹35 crore (US$3.7 million).

The single tracks were dropped sequentially: "Chikiri Chikiri" released on 7 November 2025, followed by "Rai Rai Raa Raa" on 2 March 2026. The third single "Hellallallo" debuted on 24 May 2026, and the final promotional song, "Massa Massa," released on 28 May 2026.

== Release ==
=== Theatrical ===
Peddi released globally on 4 June 2026 across various formatting options including IMAX, 4DX, D-Box, ScreenX, ICE, PCX, PXL, MX4D, Dolby Cinema, and EPIQ. It encountered multiple delays from its original window of 27 March 2026 due to pending post-production work. The film was released simultaneously in Telugu, Tamil, Hindi, Kannada, and Malayalam. It received a 12A certification from the British Board of Film Classification and a U/A classification from India's CBFC following slight dialogue adjustments.

=== Distribution ===
The theatrical distribution rights were managed by Mythri Movie Distributors LLP in the Nizam region for ₹63 crore. Jio Studios took over the distribution rights across North India, while Kishore Films distributed the movie in Karnataka. Think Studios oversaw operations in Tamil Nadu and Kerala, and Hombale Films distributed the project in international overseas territories.

=== Marketing ===
The title and initial theatrical layout were launched in March 2025. A short one-minute first-glimpse preview was launched on 6 April 2025, revealing Charan's rugged appearance. The final full-length theatrical trailer launched on 18 May 2026 during a promotional tour event hosted in Mumbai.

=== Home media ===
Post-theatrical digital streaming rights were purchased under an exclusive rights agreement with Netflix. The film began streaming on Netflix from 9 July 2026.

== Reception ==
=== Box office ===
The film brought in ₹135.36 crore worldwide on its first opening day, including ₹82.49 crore in domestic markets. It surged past the global gross milestone of ₹233 crore across its initial extended opening weekend, with Indian domestic box office returns pulling in ₹187 crore. Following its second week of tracking, the worldwide collection reached ₹320 crore. It concluded its theatrical run with a worldwide gross estimated to be ₹330–336.85 crore.

=== Critical reception ===
Peddi received mixed reviews from critics.

Neeshita Nyayapati of Hindustan Times gave the film 3.5/5 stars and wrote, "Where the film falters is when it relies on scenes that add nothing to the story beyond the same old masala. Nonetheless, the film is a win for both Buchi and Ram." Suhas Sistu of The Hans India gave 3.5/5 stars and wrote, "While a few commercial elements and certain character portions feel slightly stretched, the strong emotional core, inspiring message, and powerful performances make Peddi an engaging and satisfying big-screen entertainer."

T Maruthi Acharya of India Today gave the film 3/5 stars and wrote, "Peddi is ultimately one of those films where emotion frequently defeats logic. The difference is that it does so with remarkable conviction. Latha Srinivasan of NDTV awarded the film 3/5 stars, writing that despite minor script downfalls, it remains viable due to Ram Charan's powerful lead portrayal and emotional delivery. Divya Shree of The Times of India gave 3/5 stars and wrote, "Overall, despite occasional lags, underwritten supporting characters Peddi remains an engaging watch, driven by Ram Charan's performance and an emotionally resonant fight for identity, recognition and belonging."

Yashaswini Sri of The Indian Express offered a 2.5/5 star appraisal, indicating that while Sana introduces a strong premise and Charan excels, the pacing stumbles from uneven thematic distribution. Vinamra Mathur of Firstpost gave the film 2.5/5 stars and wrote, "Oh yes, Peddi is also a fluid and fascinating dancer who moves faster than the speed of light. He can do just about anything; only if he knew how not to be distasteful to the woman he loves, and rescue an engrossing idea from a forgettable palimpsest of Chandu Champion, Dangal, and The Karate Kid." Suresh Kavirayani of Cinema Express gave 2.5/5 stars and wrote, "Ultimately, Peddi belongs entirely to Ram Charan, whose performance carries the film from start to finish."

Sajan Shrijith of The Week gave the film 2/5 stars and wrote, ""Peddi" feels like a weird mishmash of several films we have seen before. It feels so derivative. Aside from a certain 'twist' in the third act that interestingly subverts the conventional Telugu 'mass hero' archetype, there are bits of "Pushpa", "Sarpatta Parambarai" and, to some extent, Charan's own "Rangasthalam"". Bollywood Hungama gave the film 2/5 stars and wrote, "On the whole, Peddi rests on Ram Charan’s terrific performance and a few massy, clapworthy scenes. However, the film suffers due to substandard writing, laughable developments and a stretched narrative." BVS Prakash of Deccan Chronicle gave 2 out of 5 stars and wrote, "Despite a strong performance from Ram Charan and a touching climax, Peddi fails to realize its potential due to a weak screenplay, forced commercial elements, and lack of emotional engagement."

Conversely, Sreeju Sudhakaran of Rediff rated it a more critical 1.5/5 stars, stating that the project's commentary on societal inequities was ultimately overshadowed by structural commercialization, excessive hero worship, and runtime bloat. Sangeetha Devi Dundoo of The Hindu wrote, "If only Peddi had matched its ambition with sharper writing, it might have been truly memorable. Instead, it remains a messy, uneven drama held together by a committed lead performance and a stirring musical score."

Scroll.in wrote, "Ram Charan is especially impressive in the scenes in which Peddi wills his body into performing miracles. Well suited to play a folk hero in a contemporary epic, Ram Charan is committed to Peddi’s most nonsensical moments." Sruthi Ganapathy Raman of Hollywood Reporter wrote, "Peddi does have a problem of the excesses and suffers from an overstretched climax. But by the end we don't really mind. It's the good bits that remain."

== Controversy ==
Following its theatrical release, the film drew widespread criticism over the perceived objectification of Janhvi Kapoor's character, Achiyamma. Viewers, critics, and several members of the film industry objected to certain scenes, camera angles, close-up shots and non-consensual romantic encounter arguing that they objectified the character and undermined her role in the story. The backlash triggered broader discussions on the representation of women in Indian cinema. In response, director Buchi Babu Sana issued a public apology, stating that the filmmakers had no intention of disrespecting women and acknowledging that some scenes had caused discomfort. He announced that the controversial portions would be modified or removed, emphasizing that "every woman deserves to be portrayed with dignity."

== See also ==
  - Ram Charan filmography
  - Buchi Babu Sana
  - Game Changer (film),
