= RRR: Behind and Beyond =

2024 Indian documentary film

- Official poster
- Produced by: D. V. V. Danayya
- Cinematography: Suresh Sarangam
- Edited by: Sirisha Akshintala
- Music by: Kaala Bhairava
- Production company: DVV Entertainment
- Distributed by: Walls & Trends
- Release date: 20 December 2024
- Running time: 97 minutes
- Country: India
- Languages: English; Telugu

RRR: Behind and Beyond is a 2024 Indian documentary film about the production of 2022 epic action drama film RRR. The documentary was shot during pre-production and filming and it was intended as a "behind-the-scenes" documentary for the film.

The film was envisioned by Vajja Krishna Chaitanya, Sriharsha Chundru and Pradeep Meka of Walls & Trends. It was released on 20 December 2024.

== Plot ==
The film explores the origin, writing and other production phases of the film. The lead cast and crew including S. S. Rajamouli, M. M. Keeravani, Chandrabose, N. T. Rama Rao Jr., Ram Charan, V. Vijayendra Prasad, A. Sreekar Prasad, Prem Rakshith, Sabu Cyril, K. K. Senthil Kumar and others were featured and discussed about its production.

== Release ==
RRR: Behind and Beyond was released on 20 December 2024 in limited movie theaters. It was later released on Netflix on 27 December 2024.

== Reception ==
Aditya Devulapally of The New Indian Express gave a positive review stating "RRR: Behind and Beyond is a testament to the genius of SS Rajamouli and his team. It's a love letter to the art of filmmaking, showcasing the sweat, precision, and passion that go into creating a cinematic masterpiece". Times Now's Raisa Nasreen also had a similar opinion and felt "RRR is a visual spectacle, and RRR: Behind and Beyond serves as a testament to the magic created by the film".

The Times of India rated it 3.5 out of 5 and stated "Acting as a guidebook to the film, the documentary provides insights into the painstaking efforts and ingenuity involved in its making, serving as a valuable guide for viewers to understand and appreciate the blockbuster on a deeper level". India Today opined that the film "excels in celebrating the larger-than-life visuals and global success of RRR, it leans heavily on a celebratory tone, often skimming over the challenges".

== See also ==
- Modern Masters: S. S. Rajamouli
