= Dhruva (2016 film) =

2016 Indian film by Surender Reddy

- Theatrical release poster
- Directed by: Surender Reddy
- Screenplay by: Surender Reddy; Deepak Raj; Madhusudhan
- Dialogues by: Vema Reddy
- Story by: Mohan Raja; Suresh-Balakrishnan
- Based on: Thani Oruvan by Mohan Raja
- Produced by: Allu Aravind; N. V. Prasad
- Starring: Ram Charan; Arvind Swamy; Rakul Preet Singh; Navdeep
- Cinematography: P. S. Vinod
- Edited by: Naveen Nooli
- Music by: Hiphop Tamizha
- Production company: Geetha Arts
- Distributed by: Geetha Arts
- Release date: 9 December 2016
- Running time: 165 minutes
- Country: India
- Language: Telugu

Dhruva is a 2016 Indian Telugu-language action thriller film directed by Surender Reddy and produced by Allu Aravind under his banner Geetha Arts. A remake of the Tamil film Thani Oruvan (2015), it follows Dhruva, an IPS officer who wants to arrest Siddharth Abhimanyu, a wealthy scientist, who uses secret medical and illegal practices for profit. It stars Ram Charan in the title role alongside Aravind Swamy (who reprises his role from the original version), Rakul Preet Singh, and Navdeep in pivotal roles.

The launch and principal photography of the film took place in February 2016; filming took place in Hyderabad and Jammu and Kashmir. The film features music composed by Hiphop Tamizha, the cinematography was handled by P. S. Vinod and editing was done by Navin Nooli, respectively. The film was released worldwide on 9 December 2016, after multiple postponements. It received positive reviews praising the cast performances (particularly Ram Charan and Arvind Swamy), writing, direction, action sequences and cinematography.

== Plot ==
In 1980, Chengalarayudu, a devoted low-level party member, is working for a party meeting when his wife goes into labour. The party's cunning regional leader happens to arrive nearby and lends his car to take her to hospital, but she safely gives birth inside it. In 1995, their son Venkanna tops his state exams but witnesses the party leader murdering a rebel. Venkanna takes the blame and goes to juvenile prison, making it appear that he committed the murder and securing an MLA seat for his father.

By 2016, Dhruva, a trainee IPS officer, and his friends help capture a kidnapping gang. His girlfriend Ishika discovers their secret activities. After they witness the murder of social activist Ramarao, Dhruva uncovers a criminal network led by scientist Siddharth Abhimanyu, who is actually Venkanna.

Now an ASP, Dhruva discovers Siddharth's illegal medical operations and confronts him. Siddharth's father, now a Health Minister in the minority government headed by the party leader, who is now CM of Andhra Pradesh, supports his son's unethical practices. Dhruva learns that Angelina, a Swiss pharmaceutical company owner and activist, is to be assassinated on 3 October. He seeks to prevent this by arresting Dheeraj Chandra, Irfan Ali and Jayanth Suri and making generic medicines for life-threatening diseases available cheaply in India. He uses Ishika as Angelina's body double, foiling the first attempt, but Dhruva and a fellow officer are later shot and Angelina is killed by a disguised assassin. Abbas, Irfan's brother, subsequently kills the assassin.

While Dhruva recovers in hospital, Siddharth has an electronic bug (GPS and audio transmitter) implanted in his chest during surgery, allowing him to monitor Dhruva's movements and conversations. Dhruva receives evidence against Siddharth from Akshara, a scientist who was killed for opposing him, but his friend Gautham is killed while retrieving the evidence. After discovering the bug, Dhruva and Ishika realise they must pretend to deceive Siddharth, who consequently abandons plans to kill Ishika and Preethi. Once the bug is removed, Dhruva kidnaps Abbas, obtains his SD card, records his statement and drugs him in retaliation for Gautham's death, manipulating Siddharth into killing him while Dhruva gathers evidence against the network.

Ishika informs Preethi of Siddharth's plans, prompting her to swap a speech file. Chengalarayudu fakes a stroke under political pressure, and the ruling party gives him 24 hours to resign or face dismissal. Dhruva obtains the CM's permission to arrest Siddharth. Siddharth then has his father killed and threatens the CM with accusations of revenge if action is taken against him. Nevertheless, Dhruva arrests Siddharth at his father's state funeral.

Siddharth is tricked into confessing, allowing Dhruva's team to dismantle his criminal network. Dhruva reveals that Akshara is credited with the medicine's patent and that it will be released as a generic drug. It is also revealed that Chengalarayudu survived, having been saved by Dhruva's team, and that the public funeral was actually for Gautham. Dhruva makes a deal to spare Siddharth's life in exchange for information on his associates and gives him a bulletproof vest to fake his death during transport. However, VIPs arrange to kill Siddharth. When one approaches him, Dhruva attacks him and discovers Siddharth is not wearing the vest. Preethi fatally shoots Siddharth, who tells Dhruva before dying that he hid all the evidence on an SD card inside the vest.

== Cast ==
- Ram Charan as ASP K. Dhruva IPS
- Arvind Swamy as Dr. Siddharth Abhimanyu alias Venkanna, Chengalarayudu's son (Voice dubbed by Vedala Hemachandra)
- Rakul Preet Singh as Dr. Ishika, a Forensic expert; former IPS officer; Dhruva's love interest
- Navdeep as Gowtham IPS, Dhruva's friend
- Posani Krishna Murali as Home Minister Changalarayudu, Siddharth's father
- Sayaji Shinde as Dheeraj Chandra
- Abhinaya as Dr. Akshara
- Nassar as Chief Minister of Telangana
- Farah Karimaee as Preethi, Sidharth's girlfriend
- Ali Reza as Ranveer Singh IPS, Dhruva's friend
- Randhir Gattla as Karan IPS, Dhruva's friend
- Vidyullekha Raman as Ishika's friend
- Himaja as Ishika's friend
- Saurav Chakrabarti as Abbas Ali, Irfan Ali's younger brother
- Madhusudhan Rao as Irfan Ali, Abbas Ali's elder brother
- Janaki Sabesh as Rajyalakshmi, Ishika's mother
- Ajay Rathnam as Subramaniam IPS, Ishika's father
- Surya as Ramaswamy
- C. V. L. Narasimha Rao as KMR
- Danielle Pires as Angelina
- Ram Karthik as Kamal
- Chatrapathi Sekhar as Chain Snatcher

== Production ==
=== Development ===
In September 2015, producer D. V. V. Danayya had bought the remake rights of Thani Oruvan (2015), for a sum of ₹5.5 crore (US$570,000), and announced that either Mahesh Babu or Ram Charan will play the lead role, with the latter being finalized, as Charan was impressed about the script. While, Surender Reddy, Vamshi Paidipally, Mohan Raja, the director of the original film, were supposed to helm the remake, Surender was chosen as the film's director. In an interview with, The Times of India, Surender revealed that, it took him three months to complete the script, with two months for adapting the script in Telugu, and another month for the final draft being prepared. Following the poor performance of Charan's Bruce Lee: The Fighter, Danayya stepped out of producing the venture, and subsequently Allu Aravind, bankrolled the project under the home studio Geetha Arts, collaborating with charan for the second time after Magadheera (2009). The film was tentatively titled as Rakshak, before the title Dhruva was announced. For his role in the film Ram Charan, had undergone rigorous training with an array of fitness experts. Singer Vedala Hemachandra provided voiceover for Arvind Swamy.

=== Casting ===
Ajith Kumar and R. Madhavan were both offered to play Swamy's role from the original, however, they both declined. Rajasekhar had also been approached for the role, but also declined. Arvind Swamy was later chosen to reprise his role from the original film. Sources claimed that, Swamy had charged ₹1 crore (US$100,000) as remuneration. Shruti Haasan, was cast as the female lead, reprising Nayanthara's role, collaborating with Charan after Yevadu (2014), however due to schedule conflicts, she opted out of the project and was replaced by Rakul Preet Singh. Navdeep was cast as one of Charan's friends.

Hiphop Tamizha, who composed for the original film, were signed to compose the soundtrack for the film. Aseem Mishra, who worked in Bajrangi Bhaijaan (2015), was initially chosen as the film's cinematographer, but due to his inavailability, was replaced by P. S. Vinod. Naveen Nooli, Rajeevan and Nagendra were chosen as the editor, production designer and art director respectively. The stunt sequences were choreographed by Ravi Varma. Bosco-Caesar, who previously worked for Charan in Orange (2010), choreographed the song sequences.

=== Filming ===
The film was scheduled to be launched on 16 January 2016, however, the launch was tentatively delayed to 10 February 2016. The film was launched at the office of the production house Geetha Arts on 18 February 2016, and it was announced that the regular shooting of the film would commence on 22 February 2016. However, the principal photography was commenced without Ram Charan, and it was announced that he would join the shooting from 1 March 2016. As the second schedule of the film was scheduled to be held on 10 March, Ram Charan undergone image makeover and look tests for the film, and was reported to join the sets from 14 March 2016.

On 11 May 2016, the makers planned for a shooting schedule in Jammu and Kashmir, to film an important sequence and a song, and it also reported that Ram Charan may join the schedule. Later Ram Charan and Rakul Preet moved to Kashmir, for its second schedule, which was completed on 29 June, Following the second schedule, the team moved to Hyderabad, in July 2016 to shoot important sequences, and later planned to shoot the songs in August. An exclusive making video of the film was released, in which Ram Charan was performing risky stunts, all by himself, without using any body doubles.

In August 2016, the makers revealed that, the talkie portion of the film has been completed, and later planned to shoot two songs, along with the completion of post-production works. A special set for the introduction song of the film was erected on a huge scale. For the song shoot, Ram Charan reportedly got training himself under Sultan and Dangal fame bodybuilder Rakesh Udiyar. The song shoot was completed on late October. Later, Aravind Swamy completed his portions for Dhruva. The song "Pareshanura" was shot at the Krabi Islands in Thailand, which featured Ram Charan and Rakul Preet Singh. The song "Neethoney Dance" was filmed at a huge set erected at Annapurna Studios, which was choreographed by Bosco-Caesar duo. Following the song shoot, the principal photography was wrapped up on 11 November 2016.

== Music ==
The soundtrack album and background score was composed by Hiphop Tamizha marking their debut in Telugu. The album features five tracks written by Chandrabose and Varikkuppala Yadagiri. The album was directly made available to stores and online by Aditya Music after plans for an audio launch being cancelled. While the songs are newly composed, the song "Theemai Dhan Vellum" from the original film, was reused in Telugu, titled "Manushi Musugulo Mrugam Neney Ra" released on 7 December 2016 on Sony Music India.

== Release ==
=== Theatrical ===
Ram Charan planned to release the film on 7 October 2016, coinciding with the Dusshera festival, but the makers postponed its release to avoid clash with Naga Chaitanya-starrer Premam (2016); later pushed its release to 25 November 2016, which clashes with the Telugu version of Sivakarthikeyan-starrer Remo (2016), however, the release was postponed. The producers claimed that the 2016 Indian banknote demonetisation, has postponed the film's release. The makers finally announced that the film will be released worldwide on 9 December 2016. The film completed, the censor formalities on 21 November 2016.

=== Marketing ===
Ram Charan released the pre-look of the film on 12 August 2016, The first look of the film was released on the occasion of Independence Day, 15 August 2016. The teaser was initially supposed to be released on 5 September 2016, coinciding with Vinayaka Chathurthi. However, the teaser was released on 11 October 2016, coinciding with Dusshera. The teaser crossed 1 million views within 24 hours of its release. The making video of the film was released in October 2016. The theatrical trailer of the film was released on 25 November 2016, and crossed 5 million views within release. The pre-release event of the film was held on 4 December 2016, at Yousufguda Police Lines in Hyderabad, where the promo videos of two songs "Pareshanura" and "Neethoney Dance" was released. The promo of "Neethoney dance" featured appearances of Chiranjeevi, Allu Arjun, Allu Sirish, Akhil Akkineni, Shruti Hassan, producer Allu Arvind, directors Koratala Siva and V. V. Vinayak respectively.

== Reception ==
=== Box office ===
Within first week, the film earned ₹85.4 crore (US$8.9 million) worldwide,

=== Critical response ===
The Times of India, gave 4 out of 5 stars and stated "Dhruva promises to be an edge-of-the-seat entertainer and it delivers impeccably. You won't find yourself looking away from the screen through the two-hour-forty-minute runtime. A remake done right." Firstpost gave 3 out of 5 stating "Dhruva is an edgy action thriller tale about a smart cop (Ram Charan) pitched against an evil mastermind scientist (Arvind Swamy) and is a very well adapted remake of Thani Oruvan." The Indian Express gave 3.5 out of 5 stating "This film has three stars -- its hero Ram Charan Teja, its powerful villain Arvind Swamy and its script."

The Hindu rated "‘Dhruva’ leaves you with the feeling of having read a fast-paced, unputdownable thriller."

In contrast, Hindustan Times rated 4 out of 5 stars and commented "Ram Charan's performance is so physically and mentally fit that it scream for attention while Arvind Swamy balances his viciousness and cunning intellect equally, which is enough to destroy any protagonist. Perfect combination for the film." Deccan Chronicle gave 3.5 out of 5 stars and stated: "Dhruva's makers had a ready, proven, super-hit script in front of them which is pretty fruitful."
