= Game Changer (film) =

2025 Indian film by Shankar

- Theatrical release poster
- Directed by: Shankar
- Screenplay by: Shankar
- Dialogues by: Sai Madhav Burra
- Story by: Karthik Subbaraj
- Produced by: Dil Raju; Shirish
- Starring: Ram Charan; Kiara Advani; Anjali; S. J. Suryah; Srikanth; Sunil; Jayaram; Samuthirakani
- Cinematography: Tirru
- Edited by: Shameer Muhammed; Ruben
- Music by: Thaman S
- Production company: Sri Venkateswara Creations
- Distributed by: see below
- Release date: 10 January 2025
- Running time: 165 minutes 151 minutes (trimmed version)
- Country: India
- Language: Telugu
- Budget: ₹350–500 crore (Note: While Times Now stated that the film was made on a budget of over ₹350 crore, The Economic Times, and Business Today both published that the film cost ₹400 crore to make. Box Office India stated that the film was made on a budget of ₹425 crore while Daily News and Analysis stated that the film was made on a budget of ₹500 crore.)
- Box office: est. ₹195 crore

Game Changer is a 2025 Indian Telugu-language political action drama film directed by Shankar, in his Telugu debut, and produced by Dil Raju under Sri Venkateswara Creations. The film stars Ram Charan in dual roles, alongside Kiara Advani, Anjali, S. J. Suryah, Srikanth, Sunil, Jayaram and Samuthirakani. The film featured original score and soundtrack was composed by Thaman S. While cinematography and editing were handled by Tirru and Shameer Muhammed and Ruben respectively.

The film was officially announced in February 2021, with its title revealed in March 2023. Principal photography began in October 2021 and wrapped in July 2024, following multiple production delays. Filming took place across various locations in India, as well as international destinations including Japan, China, Malaysia, Cambodia and New Zealand.

Game Changer was released on 10 January 2025, coinciding with the festival of Sankranthi. The film received mixed to negative reviews from critics, was and faced criticism from trade analysts and viewers over box office manipulation, specifically the opening day collection poster was accused of inflating figures by ₹100 crore compared to actual numbers. It went on to become a major box office failure.

== Plot ==
Ram Nandan successfully clears the UPSC exam to become a District Magistrate and is posted to Visakhapatnam, Andhra Pradesh. However, on his way to his posting, he is attacked by a gang sent by his former college rival, "Sand" Simha, who is involved in illegal sand mining under the protection of Minister Bobbili Mopidevi. Mopidevi is the son of Chief Minister Bobbili Sathyamoorthy and the younger brother of Home Minister Bobbili Munimanikyam. Though Mopidevi aspires to become the Chief Minister, he fears that the position will go to his elder brother due to seniority.

Upon assuming office, Ram summons the district's wrongdoers for a meeting and pleads with them to stop their illegal activities. When they mock him, he takes action by raiding their bases of operations, a rice trading factory, exposing the adulteration of rice. He subsequently seals the factory and demolishes a mall built on illegal land by one of the wrongdoers. He then remembers his past with his ex lover.

Past: Ram was initially pursuing an MBBS degree but had severe anger issues, particularly when witnessing injustice. His love interest, Deepika, disapproved of his aggressive nature and encouraged him to pursue civil services through the UPSC exam, specifically advising against joining the Indian Police Service, due to his violent nature. Unfortunately, Ram misses the IAS cutoff by six marks and becomes an IPS officer, leading Deepika to leave him. Eventually, he reappears for the exam, qualifies as an IAS officer, and begins searching for Deepika.

Present: After years apart, Ram finally finds Deepika living in an old-age home, and they rekindle their love. During a political rally for the CM's party, a mentally challenged elderly resident, Parvathy, unexpectedly interrupts the event and begins revealing Sathyamoorthy's past crimes. As she speaks, Sathyamoorthy is shocked to see her and suffers a fatal heart attack, but not before forgiving her for exposing his misdeeds. When Mopidevi attempts to attack Parvathy, Ram defends her and humiliates Mopidevi in front of the crowd by slapping him, causing a major political scandal. Furious at his father's betrayal after he dismisses him for corruption, Mopidevi murders Sathyamoorthy and uses public sympathy to become the next Chief Minister. Meanwhile, Ram is suspended for attacking Mopidevi and is later arrested on fabricated charges just before his wedding with Deepika. As Sathyamoorthy's funeral pyre is about to be lit, the media airs his final statement, in which he publicly endorses Ram as the next Chief Minister. Shocked by the revelation, the people rally behind Ram. Around the same time, Sabha, a veteran political figure, reveals to Ram that he is the biological son of Appanna, the original founder of Abhyudhyam Party, Sathyamoorthy's political party, and a revered leader. The past is reveled

Past: Many years ago, Appanna and his wife, Parvathy, had protested against corruption, refusing bribes from industrialists. However, his trusted allies, Sathyamoorthy and Mukundha, betrayed him, choosing personal power over principles. When Appanna attempted to dissolve the party, they murdered him, leaving Parvathy mentally unstable while Ram was separated from her as a child. To cover up the crime, Sathyamoorthy killed Mukundha and raised Mukundha's sons—Mopidevi and Munimanikyam—as his own.

Present: With this revelation, Ram reunites with his biological mother and prepares to assume the Chief Ministership, but Mopidevi refuses to withdraw his complaint against Ram, making him ineligible for the position. Ram steps down and is suspended from the government under charges of misusing the Goonda Act. Mopidevi assumes power as the new CM, but soon faces severe opposition from IAS officers across the country, who demand Ram's reinstatement. Eventually, Ram is appointed as the Election Commission Officer, and state elections are announced to take place in two months, restricting Mopidevi's ability to make policy changes. To discredit Ram, Mopidevi approaches the Election Commission, attempting to prove that Ram is the biological son of Appanna and Parvathy, accusing him of bias and claiming that he is secretly working to revive his father's party. Ram denies the allegations, stating that his adopted parents are his only real family, prioritizing the fairness of the elections over his own identity. Parvathy is brought in for confirmation, but when she claims Ram as her own son, he publicly denies it, citing her mental condition as unreliable evidence. Heartbroken, Parvathy later learns about DNA testing and, realizing its implications, commits suicide by jumping into a vat of sulfuric acid, devastating Ram. The elections proceed, but Mopidevi and his allies attempt to rig the results by destroying voting machines. Ram thwarts their efforts and ensures the machines reach the counting center safely. In the post-credits scene, the newly revived Praja Abhyudhyam Party, led by Sabha and inspired by Appanna's original principles, wins by a landslide, and Ram is elected as the new Chief Minister of Andhra Pradesh.

== Cast ==
- Ram Charan in a dual role as:
  - District collector ASP Dr. H. Ram Nandan IAS, IPS officer of Andhra Pradesh, Chief Electoral Officer, Later Chief Minister of Andhra Pradesh
  - Appanna, Ram's father and the founder of Abhyudayam Party
- Kiara Advani as Dr. Deepika, Ram's love interest-turned-wife
- Anjali as Parvathy, Appanna's wife and Ram's mother
- S. J. Suryah as Bobbili Mopidevi, Acting Chief Minister of Andhra Pradesh
- Srikanth as Bobbili Sathyamurthy, Bobbili Mopidevi's father and Chief Minister of Andhra Pradesh
- Jayaram as Bobbili Munimanikyam, Bobbili Mopidevi's elder brother and Home Minister of Andhra Pradesh
- Samuthirakani as Sabha, Appanna's companion and Sathyamurthy's best friend
- Sunil as "Side" Satyam, Ram Nandan's assistant and step brother
- Naveen Chandra as "Sand" Simha, Bobbili Mopidevi's deputy and Ram's rival from college
- Rajeev Kanakala as Mukundha, Appanna's friend; Munimanikyam and Mopidevi's biological father
- Naresh as Ram's adoptive father
- Vennela Kishore as an eve teaser
- Achyuth Kumar as Professor K. P., Deepika's father
- Subhalekha Sudhakar as a senior party worker
- Prudhvi Raj as Bobbili Mopidevi's assistant
- Raghu Babu as a party worker
- Priyadarshi Pulikonda as Ram's friend
- Satya as Ram's friend
- Venkatesh Kakumanu as Ram's friend
- Chaitanya Krishna as Ram's friend
- Harsha Chemudu as Ram's friend
- Sudharshan as Ram's friend
- Rocket Raghava as Munimanikyam's supporter
- Praveena as Ram's adoptive mother
- Racha Ravi as a local goon
- Kishore Kumar Polimera as Appanna's companion
- Viswant Duddumpudi as Raghav, Ram's adoptive brother
- Ananya Sharma as Ram's adoptive sister
- Rohini Reddy Noni
- Gautham Raju as a traffic police constable
- Ajay Ghosh as Biyyam Bhimarao
- Krishnudu as Mall Malleshwarao
- Raghu Karumanchi as a local goon
- Naga Mahesh as Police SP
- Gundu Sudarshan as a Yoga trainer
- Srikanth Iyengar as a College Professor
- Sekhar
- Thotapalli Madhu
- Duvvasi Mohan as Reporter
- Kadambari Kiran as a police officer
- Yashika Aannand as a bystander near "Side" Sathyam
- Akshaya Naik
- Mounika Reddy as Deepika's friend
- Gangavva as Villager
- Mallika
- Banerjee as Chief Secretary P. Mallikarjuna Rao
- Sreedhar Reddy Nalla
- Vadlamani Srinivas as plate manufacturer
- DD Srinivas
- Pradeep Kabra as Chotu
- Rajsekhar Aningi as a reporter
- Pawon Ramesh
- TSR Srinivasan as a voter
- Brahmanandam as District Collector Kalyana Sundaram (cameo)

== Production ==
=== Development ===
The production of Indian 2 faced significant delays following an on-set accident, compounded by the nationwide COVID-19 lockdown in India, which created uncertainty about the film's resumption. During this time, director S. Shankar shifted his focus to other projects and began developing a script for a potential multi-starrer film intended for a multi-language release, with Yash considered for one of the leading roles.

Shankar eventually collaborated with Dil Raju's Sri Venkateswara Creations, which had initially planned to produce Indian 2 before stepping away, with Lyca Productions taking over. On 12 February 2021, the production house officially announced the project, with Ram Charan confirmed as the lead. The film was tentatively titled RC15 and SVC50, referencing Charan's 15th film as an actor and the production company's 50th project. Although initial reports suggested it would be a historical action film, it was later clarified to be a political action drama. The official title, Game Changer, was unveiled on 27 March 2023, coinciding with Charan's birthday.

In December 2024, it was reported that the film was produced on a budget of ₹300–400 crore. Ram Charan was paid ₹65 crore for his role, while Shankar adopted a revenue-sharing model, taking a smaller advance and opting to receive a substantial share of the film's profits as remuneration to support its production.

=== Pre-production ===
"Just because these films deal with politics, people boil down the issues spoken about to just one word: corruption. But there are different facets to it; there are different kinds of governance, and in this film, we have tried to explore the powers and boundaries of an IAS officer [...] as a story evolves, it might shape up to carry a few resemblances to real life, but we didn't design the character based on a single person."

— Shankar on developing the story of Game Changer

Game Changer was initially developed as an interim project during the COVID-19 pandemic lockdown, along with the adaptation of Veera Yuga Nayagan Velpari (2019), based on the ruler of Parambu nādu Vēl Pāri, by author-politician S. Venkatesan, a spy thriller which demanded shooting in foreign locales and science fiction action film that needed a fresh face in the leading role and extensive visual effects. Due to the restrictions of film production in that period, he wanted something different that would be produced on a restricted budget and felt that the process of adapting another director's story that excited him. He listened to the narration of numerous directors and finalized on the original story written by Karthik Subbaraj.

Shankar also expressed his interest on doing a Telugu film, attributed to the success of the Telugu-dubbed versions of his films. Speaking to Bhuvanesh Chandar of The Hindu, he added: "I approached it the usual way I do all my films. But because it's my first straight Telugu film, and since the story demanded it, I had to inculcate Telugu culture, lifestyle and traditions." Sai Madhav Burra contributed to the dialogues, while lyricist Vivek and Farhad Samji did the same for its Tamil and Hindi versions. Vivek and S. Venkatesan also contributed to the screenplay with Shankar.

Initially, Anirudh Ravichander and Shankar's norm composer A. R. Rahman, were reported to score the music for the film, but on Dil Raju's request, Thaman S was chosen to compose the film's music, in his first collaboration with the director. Tirru was signed on as the cinematographer, also in his first time association with the director. Editor Shameer Muhammed, action choreography duo Anbariv and production designer Avinash Kolla were recruited as a part of the technical crew. Dance choreographers of the film include Prabhu Deva, Jani Master, Prem Rakshith, Bosco Martis, Ganesh Acharya, and Sandy.

=== Casting ===
Charan reportedly played dual role as a father and son. Shankar complimented that Charan had a "suppressed explosive energy" within, further adding "His performance reflects this; even when he subtly conveys something, you feel a power surging, ready to explode. He knows where to keep it low-key and how to unleash this energy when the scenes require it from him."

In late February, it was reported that South Korean actress Bae Suzy would play the female lead pairing opposite Charan, in her Indian film debut. Afterwards, Rashmika Mandanna was considered to play the female lead, before Kiara Advani was finalized for that role in July 2021; this would mark her second collaboration with Charan after Vinaya Vidheya Rama (2019). Anjali was cast in a pivotal role, while Sunil, Srikanth, Jayaram, and Naveen Chandra were all confirmed to be a part of the film during their presence at the puja ceremony. S. J. Suryah was confirmed to be part of the film in September 2022, playing the antagonist.

=== Filming ===
The film was formally launched with a muhurat shot on 8 September 2021 at Annapurna Studios in Hyderabad with a traditional pooja ceremony attended by Ranveer Singh, Chiranjeevi, and S. S. Rajamouli. Principal photography began on 22 October 2021 and the first schedule was completed in the first week of November. Filming took place in Maharashtra at Pune, Satara and Phaltan. Later that month, the second schedule began with a song shoot that was held for 10 days, at a specially erected set in Ramoji Film City. The song, which also included international dancers, was choreographed by Jani Master. The Times of India reported that nearly ₹23 crore (US$2.5 million) was spent on the song. During the schedule, the team also shot a 7-minute action sequence. Anbariv and others were hired to design these action sequences in the film.

The third schedule for the film commenced in February 2022. Planned for about 20 days, the shoot took place in Andhra Pradesh at Rajahmundry, Kakinada, Kovvur and other nearby places of West Godavari and East Godavari districts. Later the same month, it was reported that filming for Indian 2, also directed by Shankar, which the production was halted for two and a half years, would take place after wrapping up the film shoot. Charan took a break from filming to take part in the success celebrations of RRR and returned to filming in April. He and Advani began a 20-day schedule at Amritsar in April, to film their college portions. For undisclosed reasons, R. Rathnavelu joined the unit in Amritsar to complete the remaining portions in place of Tirru. In May, the crew shot a schedule in Visakhapatnam.

By July 2022, 60% of the filming was completed with Shankar intending to wrap up filming by December. Earlier the same month, a massive song involving around 1000 dancers was shot in Punjab and Hyderabad. After the song shoot, an action sequence involving 1200 fighters was planned. In August, Shankar confirmed that he would be shooting both Game Changer and Indian 2, simultaneously. The filming was planned to resume in early September in Hyderabad and Visakhapatnam. In November 2022, 10 days of a schedule was filmed in New Zealand, where the team picturized an expensive song across multiple exotic locations in the country.

In February 2023, filming resumed with a few scenes shot at Gandhi Institute of Technology and Management, Visakhapatnam, followed by Simhachalam and Charminar. A few pictures of scenes from the set were leaked online during the filming at the university. In March 2023, a song involving 100 dancers, choreographed by Prabhu Deva, was shot. In April 2023, Shankar revealed that he would be shooting the climactic scenes soon. On 26 April 2023, filming of the climactic scenes started under the supervision of Anbariv, in a special set in Shamshabad. Charan shot high combat scenes with 1200 fighters for the same. On 9 May, filming of the climax was wrapped. In July, an action sequence choreographed by Anbariv was wrapped in Hyderabad. Mysore schedule was started on 23 November, and was wrapped early December. In late December, a short schedule in Hyderabad, featuring Srikanth, Samuthirakani, S. J. Suryah, and others was wrapped up. The final schedule was completed in July 2024. In December 2024, it was reported that the filming lasted for 240 days, in which Ram Charan's portion were reportedly shot for 192 days.

=== Post-production ===
In an interview, editor Shameer Muhammed told that the film was initially 7 to 7.5 hours long, which he trimmed down to 3.5 hours before another editor joined the project and shortened it even further. He also shared that his experience working with Shankar was "terrible".

== Marketing ==
The film's first look and title was revealed on 27 March 2023, coinciding with Charan's birthday. The teaser of the film was released on 9 November 2024 in Lucknow. The official trailer was released on 2 January 2025.

== Music ==
The soundtrack is composed by Thaman S, in his first musical collaboration, along with his third overall collaboration, with Shankar, after making his acting debut in Boys (2003), and Eeram (2009), which was produced by Shankar. It also marks the fourth time Shankar is working with another music composer besides his regular collaborator, A. R. Rahman. The audio rights for the film were acquired by Saregama.

The soundtrack featured seven songs, with lyrics written by Anantha Sriram, Ramajogayya Sastry, Kasarla Shyam and Roll Rida. Four of them—"Jaragandi", "Raa Macha Macha", "Naa Naa Hyraanaa" and "Dhop"—were released as singles, prior to the album's release on 4 January 2025.

== Release ==
=== Theatrical ===
Game Changer was theatrically released on 10 January 2025, coinciding with Sankranti weekend, in standard and IMAX, 4DX, Dolby Cinema, and Qube EPIQ formats. Apart from the original Telugu language, it was also released in the Tamil and Hindi languages. In the United Kingdom, as with the rest of the world, the film was initially released on the same day; however, in a version which was classified 12A by the British Board of Film Classification (BBFC) for moderate violence, threat, reference to suicide and sexual violence.

Previously, the film was announced to release on Christmas 2024, but due to unfinished post-production work it was eventually postponed to the current date due to Viswambhara being delayed due to production delays.

=== Distribution ===
The Tamil dubbed version of the film is being distributed by Adityaram and T. Muruganantham, under SVC Adityaram Movies and Rockfort Entertainment. Anil Thadani of AA Films acquired the distribution rights of the dubbed Hindi version for North India.

=== Home media ===
The digital distribution rights of the film were acquired by Amazon Prime Video for ₹105 crore. The film began streaming on Amazon Prime Video from 7 February 2025 in Telugu and dubbed versions of Tamil, Malayalam and Kannada languages. The Hindi dubbed version began streaming on ZEE5 from 7 March 2025.

== Reception ==
=== Critical response ===
Rachit Gupta of Filmfare rated the film 3.5/5 and wrote, "In essence, Game Changer is an unmistakable Shankar creation fuelled and delivered with Ram Charan's charisma." The Hans India also rated the film 3.5 out of 5, calling the performances of Ram Charan and Anjali as "powerhouse" and "strong impact" respectively, and noted, "Game Changer stands out as a solid political drama with exceptional performances, making it a must-watch". Paul Nicodemus of The Times of India gave 3/5 stars and wrote, "Overall, Game Changer is a well-executed commercial film. Shankar's grand scale and Ram Charan's brilliant performance, combined with strong supporting roles and technical excellence, make it a compelling watch for enthusiasts of the genre". The critic also praised the performance of Anjali and S. J. Suryah. Bollywood Hungama rated the film 3.0/5 and wrote, "Game Changer is yet another mass-appealing anti-corruption saga from Shankar that works due to the clapworthy moments, twists and turns, relatable goings-on and performances of Ram Charan and S. J. Suryah."

Prathamesh Jadhav of The Free Press Journal rated Game Changer 3/5 stars, calling it a grand and entertaining political drama with standout performances from Ram Charan and Anjali. Sashidhar Adivi of Times Now gave 3/5 stars and wrote, "With style and swag in abundance, Game Changer is like the quintessential masala entertainer. The film serves up a little bit of everything in its narrative — action, drama, music, romance, exotic locations and sentiment. The screenwriting could have been better." Avad Mohammad of OTTplay gave 3/5 stars and wrote, "Ram Charan shines in this social drama that has a predictable plot, narrated in a decent manner."

Sangeetha Devi Dundoo of The Hindu described Ram Charan's portrayal of Appanna as "Ram Charan's best performance after Rangasthalam." She remarked, "Director Shankar's latest has fun segments featuring Ram Charan and SJ Suryah, but the hasty narrative leaves little room for emotional heft." Avinash Ramachandran of The Indian Express gave 2.5/5 stars and wrote, "Game Changer is essentially a lot of nice segments that are stitched together in the hope that it would make a good film. Now, individually, these segments have a sense of purpose, but together, they sometimes become incoherent due to the lack of focus."

Janani K of India Today gave 2.5/5 stars and wrote, "It is high time that Shankar rethinks his way to grandeur filmmaking. [...] Game Changer presents potential ideas but falls short in delivering a lasting impact." Sudhir Srinivasan of Cinema Express gave 2.5/5 stars and wrote, "But here's the thing: a three-hour canvas of hero-uses-rules-to-thwart-villains can only stretch so far without fraying, especially when the film itself doesn't treat it too much reverence." Kirubhakar Purushothaman of News18 gave 2.5/5 stars and wrote, "While mainstream Indian cinema has changed significantly in terms of style and content, Shankar's constant bet on his old ideas seems to be surprising. A lot remains the same in this film, which is ironically titled Game Changer."

Saibal Chatterjee of NDTV gave 2/5 stars and wrote, "Game Changer is never found wanting in the matter of giving plausibility a wide berth and finding easy answers to complex conundrums. The film has a second half that is far better than the first, but taken together they do not add up." BVS Prakash of Deccan Chronicle gave 2/5 stars and wrote, "Director Shankar has to give up his old ideas and come back with refreshing story which doesn't have any shade or resemblance to his earlier blockbusters."

Amit Bhatia of ABP Live gave 2/5 stars and wrote, "Game Changer' fails to live up to its grand title. While Ram Charan's performance is a saving grace, the predictable storyline, over-the-top execution, and lack of originality weigh the film down." Vinamra Mathur of Firstpost gave 2/5 stars and wrote, "In Game Changer, filmmaker Karthik Subbaraj gets the credit for the story. Of course, it's not as unwatchable as Satyameva Jayate 2 or Indian 2, but is that genuinely a compliment?" Neeshita Nyayapati of Hindustan Times wrote, "Game Changer is strictly average, even as you're rooting for it to be something more. It succeeds in staying focused on what it sets out to do - call out corruption in Indian politics - but gives you nothing more. And after Shankar's last outing, Indian 2, maybe that's a win."

=== Box office ===
The film had an estimated worldwide gross of ₹195 crore. It faced criticism from trade analysts and viewers over box office manipulation, specifically the opening day collection poster was accused of inflating figures by ₹100 crore compared to actual numbers.
