= G. V. Sudhakar Naidu =

Indian actor

- Occupations: Actor, director
- Years active: 1998–present

G. V. Sudhakar Naidu is an Indian actor and director, who has worked predominantly Telugu films. He also contested for Gajuwaka constituency and from congress in 2014 general elections.

He is more well known in the Telugu film industry as G. V. rather than Sudhakar Naidu.

== Filmography ==
=== As director ===
- Hero (2008)
- Ranga The Donga (2010)

=== As actor ===
==== Telugu ====
- Anthapuram (1998)
- Balaram (2000)
- Ayodhya Ramayya (2000)
- Suri (2000)
- Itlu Sravani Subramanyam (2001)
- Chinna (2001)
- Seema Simham (2002)
- Chandravamsam (2002)
- Vasu (2002)
- Indra (2002)
- Okkadu (2003)
- Simhadri (2003)
- Tiger Harischandra Prasad (2003)
- Samba (2004)
- Andhrawala (2004)
- Athanokkade (2005)
- Narasimhudu (2005)
- Nayakudu (2005)
- Happy (2006)
- Ranam (2006)
- Asadhyudu (2006)
- Pokiri (2006)
- Pournami (2006) as Pournami's stalker
- Annavaram (2006)
- Aadavari Matalaku Arthale Verule (2007)
- Chirutha (2007)
- Kantri (2008)
- Ranga The Donga (2010)
- Brahmi Gadi Katha (2011)
- Oosaravelli (2011)
- Sudigadu (2012)
- Okkadine (2013)
- Chandee (2013)
- Yevadu (2014)
- Legend (2014)
- Poga (2014)
- Dictator (2016)
- Sarrainodu (2016)
- Jakkana (2016)
- Hyper (2016)
- Appatlo Okadundevadu (2016)
- Jaya Janaki Nayaka (2017)
- Vinaya Vidheya Rama (2019)

==== Tamil ====
- Thavasi (2001)
- Gajendra (2004)
- Pachchak Kuthira (2006)
- Pokkiri (2007)
- Kuruvi (2008)

==== Kannada ====
- Durgi (2004)
- Kalasipalya (2004)
- Mandya (2006)...Bhadrayya's aide
- Police Story 2 (2007)

==== Hindi ====
- Durga (2002)
- Wanted (2009)
- R... Rajkumar (2013)

==== Bhojpuri ====
- Nirahua No. 1 (2009)
