= Vinaya Vidheya Rama =

2019 Indian film by Boyapati Srinu

- Theatrical release poster
- Directed by: Boyapati Srinu
- Written by: Story & Screenplay: Boyapati Srinu; Additional Screenplay: Jayakrishnan TC; Dialogues: M. Rathnam
- Produced by: D. V. V. Danayya
- Starring: Ram Charan; Vivek Oberoi; Kiara Advani; Prashanth
- Cinematography: Arthur A. Wilson; Rishi Punjabi
- Edited by: Kotagiri Venkateswara Rao
- Music by: Devi Sri Prasad
- Production company: DVV Entertainments
- Release date: 11 January 2019
- Running time: 144 minutes
- Country: India
- Language: Telugu
- Box office: est.₹94 crore

Vinaya Vidheya Rama (transl. The Obedient and Loyal Rama) is a 2019 Indian Telugu-language action comedy drama film co-written and directed by Boyapati Srinu and produced by D. V. V. Danayya. The film stars Ram Charan, Vivek Oberoi, Kiara Advani and Prashanth. The music was composed by Devi Sri Prasad. The film revolves around Konidela Ram, an angry young man who sets out to destroy a dictator in Bihar, after the lives of his loved ones are threatened and his elder brother gets killed.

The film was released on 11 January 2019 along with dubbed versions in Tamil and Malayalam. The film was panned by critics and audience alike and ended up a box-office bomb. Following the commercial failure of the film, Charan penned an apology letter to his fans.

== Plot ==
Konidela Ram Charan alias Ram is an infant, who is adopted by four brothers: Konidela Bhuvan Kumar, Sekar, Raju and Madhunandan. At a young age, Ram kills a kidnapper, who wanted to kill them as they became witnesses to his crimes. When Dr. Konidela Subramanyam learns about this, he decide to raise them as their children.

Years later, Ram leads a happy life with his brothers, sister-in-laws and their children. Bhuvan is now a chief election commissioner with Ram, along with Sekar, Raju, and Madhunandan as his subordinates. Ram later falls in love with Sita, the daughter of woman's right activist, Puppy, and soon they get engaged. Ballem Balaram is an aspiring politician, who tries to bribe Bhuvan as the former had seized his black money. However, Bhuvan refuses, which infruriates Balaram and threatens him, but Ram threatens him back in front of the media.

Balram's brother-in-law Pandem Parasuram ask Bhuvan to apologise, but Ram threatens and thrashes him. Humiliated, Parasuram approaches Shankar, an encounter specialist. Shankar takes Ram's family hostage. Ram reaches the spot to apologise Parasuram, but encounters goons from Bihar, sent by the dictator Raja Bhai. After executing all of them, Gayathri Devi, Ram's elder sister-in-law and Bhuvan's wife questions Ram about the happenings.

Past: Bhuvan is actually sent to Bihar as the election commissioner, who travels to Bihar with his subordinates. Ram travels to Gujarat with his family and Sita in order to visit a temple. When Bhuvan reaches Bihar, they are captured and brought to Raja Bhai. Bhuvan calls Ram, who was at the airport. Ram manages to reach the spot and finishes 300 men single-handedly, where he gets captured and taken to Raja Bhai. A fight ensues where Bhuvan gets stabbed by Raja Bhai and Ram severely wounds Raja Bhai, thus sending him to a coma. Bhuvan succumbed to his injuries, leaving Ram and his brothers devastated.

Present: Gayathri is devastated upon learning this, and tells Ram to take her to Bhuvan's pyre and later to Raja Bhai. Raja Bhai recovers from coma, and Gayathri challenges him to fight Ram burns. The enraged Ram fights Raja Bhai's henchmen and soon decapitates Raja Bhai with a sword attached to a tree, thus avenging Bhuvan's death. Ram and Sita reunites along with his family.

== Cast ==
- Ram Charan as Konidela Ram
- Vivek Oberoi as Raja Bhai Munna
- Kiara Advani as Konidela Sita "Papa", Ram's wife
- Prashanth as Konidela Bhuvan Kumar
  - Master Charan Ram as young Konidela Bhuvan Kumar
- Sneha as Konidela Gayatri Devi, Bhuvan's wife and Ram's eldest sister-in-law
- Aryan Rajesh as Konidela Sekhar, Ram's second brother
- Madhumitha as Sekhar's wife and Ram's 2nd sister-in-law
- Ravi Varma as Konidela Raju, Ram's third brother
- Himaja as Raju's wife and Ram's third sister-in-law
- Madhunandan as Konidela Madhu, Ram's fourth brother
- Praveena as Sailaja, Konidela Madhu's wife and Ram's fourth sister-in-law
- Mukesh Rishi as Pandyam Parasuram
- Harish Uthaman as Ballem Balaram, Parasuram's brother-in-law
- Mahesh Manjrekar as Chief Minister of Bihar, Prabhunathed
- Chalapathi Rao as Konidela Subramanyam; foster father of five brothers including Bhuvan Kumar and Ram
- Jayaprakash as Chief Minister of AP
- Saleem Baig as Ranjit Singh, Raja Bhai's henchmen
- Hema as Madhavi "Puppy", Sita's mother
- Prudhvi Raj as Dharmendra, Sita's father
- G. V. Sudhakar Naidu as Raja Bhai's goon
- Priyadarshini Ram as encounter specialist Shankar
- Esha Gupta as Sharanya (special appearance in song "Ek Baar" and extended cameo)

== Production ==
Rishi Punjabi, who worked with Boyapati Sreenu on Sarrainodu and Jaya Janaki Nayaka, was the initial cinematographer. He shot half of the film before opting out, due to scheduling conflicts. As a result, Arthur A. Wilson completed the rest of the portions. It was his fourth collaboration with Boyapati Sreenu after Bhadra, Simha, and Dammu. A.S. Prakash worked as the production designer of the film marking his third collaboration with Boyapati Srinu after Simha (film) and Legend (2014 film).

The film also marks the return of Tamil actor Prashanth in Telugu films after nearly 25 years following Tholi Muddhu (1993).

== Music ==
The music was composed by Devi Sri Prasad in his fourth collaboration with Boyapati after Bhadra, Tulasi, Legend and Jaya Janaki Nayaka and his third collaboration with Charan after Yevadu and Rangasthalam.

Telugu track list (Original Track)
| No. | Title | Lyrics | Singer(s) | Length |
|---|---|---|---|---|
| 1. | "Thandaane Thandaane" | Sri Mani | M. L. R. Karthikeyan | 4:20 |
| 2. | "Thassadiyya" | Sri Mani | Jaspreet Jasz, M. M. Manasi | 4:26 |
| 3. | "Ek Baar" | Sri Mani | Devi Sri Prasad, Ranina Reddy | 4:19 |
| 4. | "Rama Loves Sita" | Sri Mani | Simha, Priya Himesh | 3:54 |
| 5. | "Amma Nanna" | Ramajogayya Sastry | Kaala Bhairava | 3:24 |
| Total length: | | | | 20:23 |

Tamil track list
| No. | Title | Lyrics | Singer(s) | Length |
|---|---|---|---|---|
| 1. | "Thandaane Thandaane" | Sugumar Ghaneshan | M. L. R. Karthikeyan | 9:11 |
| 2. | "Thassadiyya" | Sugumar Ghaneshan | Yazin Nizar, Surmukhi Raman | 4:24 |
| 3. | "Ek Baar" | Sugumar Ghaneshan | Yazin Nizar, Hari Priya | 3:01 |
| 4. | "Rama Loves Sita" | Sugumar Ghaneshan | Jagadish, Surmukhi Raman | 3:54 |
| 5. | "Amma Appa" | Sugumar Ghanesha | Yazin Nizar | 1:40 |
| Total length: | | | | 20:26 |

Malayalam track list
| No. | Title | Lyrics | Singer(s) | Length |
|---|---|---|---|---|
| 1. | "Thandaane Thandaane" | Siju Thuravoor | M. L. R. Karthikeyan | 4:11 |
| 2. | "Romeo Juliet" | Siju Thuravoor | Yazin Nizar, Ala B Bala | 4:24 |
| 3. | "Ek Baar" | Siju Thuravoor | Yazin Nizar, Ala B Bala | 4:01 |
| 4. | "Rama Loves Sita" | Siju Thuravoor | Sreeraj Sahajan, Ala B Bala | 3:54 |
| 5. | "Amma Nee Aranenu" | Siju Thuravoor | Yazin Nizar | 1:40 |
| Total length: | | | | 18:16 |

== Release ==
Vinaya Vidheya Rama was released worldwide on 11 January 2019 coinciding with the Sankranthi weekend.

== Reception ==
The film received negative reviews from both critics and audience. On the review aggregator website Rotten Tomatoes, 0% of 5 critics' reviews are positive, with an average rating of 2.3/10.

Sangeetha Devi Dundoo of The Hindu wrote "Vinaya Vidheya Rama is a unique film that needs to be watched, especially for aspiring screenwriters and directors to know how not to write or make a film". The Times of India gave 1.5 out of 5 stars stating "Boyapati becomes a pale shadow of himself as a storyteller. The problem with Vinaya Vidheya Rama isn't the deja vu factor but the fact that the filmmaker takes the audiences and cinematic liberties for granted". India Today gave 2 out of 5 stars stating "Vinaya Vidheya Rama has a meaty story which could have been made into an entertaining commercial actioner. But no, Boyapati Srinu had bigger plans with the film. A plan so big that the story defies gravity, logic, et al(and others)".

The Indian Express gave 1 out of 5 stars stating "Vinaya Vidheya Rama is like watching a Balakrishna action film on steroids. Clumsy and unconvincing screenplay". The New Indian Express gave 1.5 out of 5 stars stating "If there is a plot and a story that is worth a notice, then it is lost between all the fights, songs, dances and random elevation dialogues". Hindustan Times gave 0.5 out of 5 stars stating "The film itself feels dated. It is a mess that even Ram Charan – with all the weird stunts -- cannot punch his way out of". Firstpost gave 1.5 out of 5 stars stating "Realism has absolutely no place in the world of Vinaya Vidheya Rama".
