= Chirutha =

2007 Indian film by Puri Jagannadh

- Theatrical release poster
- Directed by: Puri Jagannadh
- Written by: Puri Jagannadh
- Produced by: C. Aswani Dutt
- Starring: Ram Charan; Neha Sharma; Prakash Raj; Ashish Vidyarthi
- Cinematography: Shyam K. Naidu
- Edited by: M. R. Varma
- Music by: Mani Sharma
- Production company: Vyjayanthi Movies
- Release date: 27 September 2007
- Running time: 151 minutes
- Country: India
- Language: Telugu
- Box office: ₹25 crore distributors' share

Chirutha (transl. Cheetah) is a 2007 Indian Telugu-language action comedy film directed by Puri Jagannadh and produced by C. Aswani Dutt under Vyjayanthi Movies. The film stars debutants Ram Charan and Neha Sharma, alongside Prakash Raj, Ashish Vidyarthi, and Sayaji Shinde in supporting roles. Music for the film was composed by Mani Sharma, with cinematography by Shyam K. Naidu. The story follows Charan, a young man on a mission of vengeance against Mattu Bhai, a crime lord responsible for the deaths of his parents. This film is an unofficial copy/remake of Swept Away (2002 film) directed by Guy Ritchie.

The film began production in early 2007 and was shot extensively in Thailand. Released worldwide on 27 September 2007, Chirutha received positive reviews from critics and was a commercial success. It set the record as the highest-grossing Telugu film for a debut actor collecting a distributor's share of ₹25 crore at the box office until it was surpassed by Uppena in 2021. Ram Charan's performance earned him the Filmfare Award for Best Male Debut – South and a Nandi Special Jury Award.

== Plot ==
An auto driver witnesses Mattu Bhai, murdering a news reporter and helps the cops to arrest Mattu Bhai. That night, Mattu Bhai and his henchmen attack the auto driver and his family where they kill the auto driver and injures his wife but the auto driver's son Charan survives. Charan's mother is critically injured, and Charan and his uncle lack the money for her operation. The local mafia leader's son commits a crime and offers Charan a deal. To pay for his mother's surgery, Charan falsely confesses to the crime and gets imprisoned.

Twelve years later, Charan gets released from prison and learns from his uncle Venkateswara Rao that his mother has died. Charan meets Sanjana, the daughter of Karthikeya, a wealthy business magnate. Ajay, a cop, helps Charan obtain a passport and Charan leaves for Bangkok to join a travel agency recommended by his uncle. Sanjana and her friends arrive in Bangkok as tourists where Charan works as a tour guide. Charan seems irritable around Sanjana as she is a annoying spoiled brat. When Biku, a gangster and his henchmen bother Sanjana, Charan saves her and becomes her bodyguard.

A few days later, Biku's men attack Sanjana again and Charan rescues her. They escape on a water bike but it runs out of gas leaving them stranded in the sea. They swim to a nearby island, where Charan initially teases Sanjana but later confesses his love for her. Karthikeya and others believe Charan has kidnapped Sanjana as they discovered Charan's criminal record. Karthikeya organizes a search party to find Sanjana. Charan spots a helicopter but Sanjana, who now loves Charan, does not want to be found fearing her father’s disapproval. Charan reveals his past

Past: Charan arrived at Bangkok to kill Mattu Bhai, who runs a notorious crime network in Bangkok and other cities. Charan had tried to kill Mattu Bhai at a bar, but he escaped and stopped coming to Bangkok.

Present: While Charan and Sanjana have a chat, an army of black assassins arrives and a fight ensues. Karthikeya arrives in a helicopter. Sanjana runs to her father, explaining that Charan saved her. When Sanjana admits that she loves Charan, Karthikeya orders his men to kill Charan. Charan is knocked unconscious, but is later rescued by a company member. Sanjana argues with her father and runs back to Charan. Karthikeya contacts Charan, revealing that his mother is actually alive and that his uncle had lied about her death. Karthikeya offers to trade Charan's mother for Sanjana. Charan brings Sanjana to the arranged meeting spot, telling her that his mother has no one else while Sanjana still has her father. Karthikeya takes Sanjana and releases Charan's mother. Meanwhile, Mattu Bhai sees the photos of Charan and Sanjana on TV and recognizes Charan where he instructs Biku to kidnap Sanjana. During the exchange, a shootout occurs and Karthikeya's men are killed while Biku escapes with Sanjana. Karthikeya, who is shot in the leg, acknowledges Charan's love for his mother and urges him to rescue Sanjana. Charan leaves his mother with Karthikeya and chases Biku. Biku's men capture Charan and take him to the island, where Mattu Bhai and Biku are hiding. Mattu Bhai lets Charan and Sanjana escape, intending to hunt them. Charan kills Mattu Bhai’s men including Biku and lures Mattu Bhai into a trap. Charan finally kills Mattu Bhai in the same manner in which Mattu Bhai killed Charan's father. Charan and Sanjana return to their home.

== Cast ==
- Ram Charan as Charan, Sanjana's love interest
  - Akash Puri as Young Charan
- Neha Sharma as Sanjana, Charan's love interest
- Prakash Raj as Karthikeya, Sanjana's father
- Ashish Vidyarthi as Mattu Bhai
- Tanikella Bharani as Venkateswara Rao, Charan's uncle
- Sayaji Shinde as ASP Ajay IPS
- Raghu Babu as Thief
- Brahmanandam as Krish
- Ali as Nachimi
- Daniel Balaji as Biku, Mattu Bhai's son
- Dharmavarapu Subramanyam as Subramanyam, Sanjana's PA
- M. S. Narayana as Babi, Charan's boss
- Venu Madhav as Charan's jailmate and friend
- G. V. Sudhakar Naidu as Jailer
- Uttej as Charan's colleague in Bangkok
- Srinivasa Reddy as Constable
- Bandla Ganesh as Charan's colleague in Bangkok
- Pragathi as Charan's mother
- Surya as Auto Driver, Charan's father
- Satyam Rajesh as Watchman
- Khayyum as Charan’s friend
- Babloo as Charan's colleague in Bangkok

== Production ==
The film had completed its Bangkok schedule and also the Hyderabad schedule. The unit again left for Bangkok for the final schedule. After the launch and a few days of shooting at Bangkok, the unit returned to Hyderabad. In May 2007, a fight sequence was shot in a huge set was erected at a cost of around ₹70 lakhs at Annapurna Studios under the supervision of Vijayan. Later, the unit left for Bangkok to continue its shooting there. The introductory song was choreographed at Hyderabad under the dance direction of Raghava Lawrence in August.

== Soundtrack ==
Chirutha

Soundtrack album by Mani Sharma
- Released: 22 August 2007
- Recorded: 2007
- Genre: Soundtrack
- Length: 32:14
- Language: Telugu
- Label: Aditya Music
- Producer: Mani Sharma

Mani Sharma chronology
Lakshyam (2007)	Chirutha (2007)	Athidhi (2007)

Mani Sharma composed the film's soundtrack and score. The audio of the film was released on 22 August 2007. The soundtrack received huge response and cassettes and CDs were sold quickly.

Track-List
No.	Title	Lyrics	Singer(s)	Length
1.	"Yamaho Yama"	Sirivennela Seetharama Sastry	Tippu	4:57
2.	"Love U Raa"	Ramajogayya Sastry	Deepu, Rita, Sravana Bhargavi	4:50
3.	"Endhuko Pichi Pichi"	Bhaskarabhatla Ravi Kumar	N. C. Karunya, Sooraj Santhosh, Ranjith, Devan Ekambaram, Naveen Madhav, Chakri	4:31
4.	"Chamka Chamka"	Viswa	Ranjith, Geeta Madhuri	5:07
5.	"Maro Maro"	Bhaskarabhatla Ravi Kumar	Rahul Nambiar, Suchitra	4:41
6.	"Kannethi"	Kandikonda	Mallikarjun	1:47
7.	"Ivala"	Kandikonda	KK, Sunitha Upadrashta	4:28
8.	"Innallu"	Kandikonda	Usha	1:49
Total length:				32:21

== Release ==
The film was initially slated to release on 22 September 2007 but postponed to 27 September 2007. The film released in 708 screens including 532 in Andhra Pradesh, 44 in Karnataka, 4 in Tamil Nadu, 3 in Odisha and 115 overseas. Chirutha collected a first day distributors' share of nearly ₹3.81 crore (US$410,000). In Chennai, it debuted at number 1 and averaged 100% collections from 3 screens in its opening weekend.

=== Home media ===
The film is available on YouTube. Broadcasting rights acquired by Zee Telugu and streaming rights sold to ZEE5 & Prime Video.

== Reception ==
Chirutha received generally positive reviews from critics.

Y. Sunita Chowdary of The Hindu mentioned that: "Chiruta is garnished well with commercial trappings. You'll find an adequate dose of romance, sentiment and dollops of violence" and praised Charan's performance that he "earn some serious brownie points for effortless dancing and fights." Sify appreciated Charan's performance stating that "Ram Charan has rendered excellent performance in the dance and stunts departments [..] He looks smart and promising". Idlebrain rated the film 3 out of 5 stating "The first half of the film is alright. The second half slows down a bit. The plus points of the film are Ram Charan Teja, songs and fights. On the flip side a better heroine and a better second half would have done wonders to the film".

=== Box office ===
Chirutha collected a share of 12 crores in AP alone for 7 days. The film collected ₹22.08 crore (US$2.4 million) share in 50 Days and declared as a Box Office Hit worldwide. Chirutha completed 50 Days in 178 direct centres and 15 other shifted centres. the film completed 100 days in 38 direct centres.

== Dubbed versions ==
The film was dubbed into Tamil as Siruthai Puli. On 14 September 2012 the movie was released in the Malayalam dubbed version named Cheetah.
