= Buchi Babu Sana =

Indian filmmaker (born 1982)

- Born: 15 February 1982 (age 44); Uppada, Andhra Pradesh, India
- Occupations: Film director; screenwriter
- Years active: 2021–present

Buchi Babu Sana is an Indian film director and screenwriter who works in Telugu cinema. He made his directorial debut with the film Uppena, which won the Best Feature Film in Telugu at the 69th National Film Awards.

== Filmography ==
Key
†	Denotes films that have not yet been released

Year	Title	Notes	Ref.
2021	Uppena	Directorial debut	
2026	Peddi		

== Awards and nominations ==
Award	Category	Work	Result	Ref.
National Film Awards	Best Feature Film in Telugu	Uppena	Won	
Filmfare Awards South	Best Director – Telugu	Uppena	Nominated	
SIIMA Awards	Best Debut Director – Telugu	Uppena	Won	
Sakshi Excellence Awards 2021	Debutant Director of the Year	Uppena	Won	
