= Modern Masters: S. S. Rajamouli =

- Directed by: Raghav Khanna; Tanvi Ajinkya
- Music by: Rohit Kulkarni
- Country of origin: India
- Original language: English

Production
- Producers: Sameer Nair; Deepak Segal; Anupama Chopra
- Cinematography: Nikunj Singh
- Editor: Sanyukta Kaza
- Running time: 74 minutes
- Production companies: Applause Entertainment; Film Companion Studios

Original release
- Network: Netflix
- Release: 2 August 2024

Modern Masters: S. S. Rajamouli is a 2024 Indian English-language documentary film directed by Raghav Khanna and Tanvi Ajinkya. The film revolves around filmmaker S. S. Rajamouli and events related to his film career and also how he created the genre of pan-india film. Produced by Applause Entertainment and Film Companion Studios, it was premiered on Netflix on 2 August 2024.

== Cast ==
- S. S. Rajamouli
- Anupama Chopra

Special appearances

- N. T. Rama Rao Jr.
- Prabhas
- Ram Charan
- Karan Johar
- James Cameron
- M. M. Keeravani
- S. S. Kanchi
- V. Vijayendra Prasad
- K. Raghavendra Rao
- Rama Rajamouli
- Shobu Yarlagadda
- S. S. Karthikeya
- M. M. Srivalli (voice-over only)
- Rana Daggubati
- Joe Russo

== Production ==
The documentary was announced on Netflix in January 2023. Principal photography took place in Hyderabad, Tokyo and Los Angeles. The teaser was released on 17 January 2023, followed by the trailer on 21 July 2024.

== Release and reception ==
Modern Masters: S. S. Rajamouli was released on 2 August 2024 on Netflix.

Shubhra Gupta of The Indian Express gave the film 2.5/5 stars. Arjun Menon of Rediff.com rated the film 4/5 stars. The film was reviewed by Devansh Sharma for Hindustan Times and Sangeetha Devi Dundoo for The Hindu.
