= Ram Charan =

Indian actor and film producer (b. 1985)

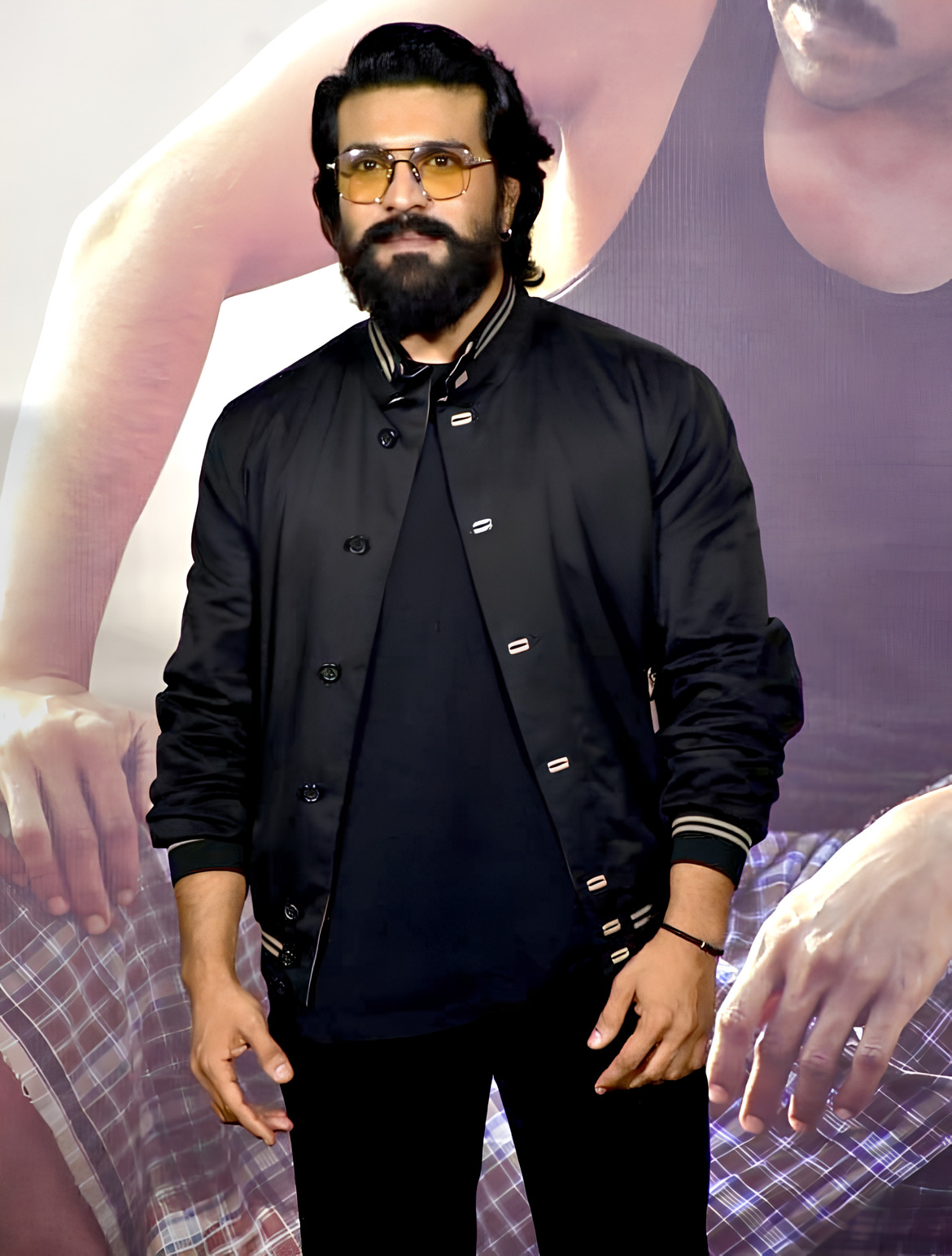
- Ram Charan in 2025
- Born: Konidela Ram Charan; 27 March 1985 (age 41); Madras, Tamil Nadu, India
- Occupations: Actor; film producer; entrepreneur
- Years active: 2007–present
- Organization(s): Konidela Productions; V. Mega Pictures
- Works: Full list
- Spouse: Upasana Kamineni (m. 2012)
- Children: 3
- Father: Chiranjeevi
- Relatives: Pawan Kalyan (uncle); Shobana Kamineni (mother-in-law); Allu Arjun (first cousin); Allu Aravind (maternal uncle)
- Family: Konidela–Allu family
- Awards: Full list

Konidela Ram Charan (born 27 March 1985) is an Indian actor, film producer, and entrepreneur who primarily works in Telugu films. He is one of the highest-paid actors in Telugu cinema and is also known for his dancing. He has featured in Forbes India's Celebrity 100 list since 2013. Charan is the recipient of several awards, including four Filmfare Awards and two Nandi Awards.

Charan made his acting debut with the action film Chirutha (2007), a box office hit, winning the Filmfare Award for Best Male Debut – South. He rose to prominence starring in S. S. Rajamouli's fantasy action film Magadheera (2009), the highest-grossing Telugu film of all time at the time of its release, winning the Filmfare Award for Best Actor – Telugu. He went on to star in notable films such as Orange (2010), Racha (2012), Naayak (2013), Yevadu (2014), Govindudu Andarivadele (2014), and Dhruva (2016).

Charan achieved further commercial success with action thriller Rangasthalam (2018), winning his second Filmfare Award for Best Actor – Telugu, and RRR (2022), which currently ranks as the fifth-highest-grossing Indian film of all time and his highest grosser; the latter film earned him international recognition, including a nominations at the Critics' Choice Super Awards for Best Actor in an Action Movie, and getting honoured for his performance at the Indian Film Festival of Melbourne (IFFM) 2024, and achieving his third Filmfare Award for Best Actor - Telugu.

In 2016, Charan launched his own production house Konidela Production Company, which has notably backed Khaidi No. 150 (2017) and Sye Raa Narasimha Reddy (2019). Beyond his film career, he owns the polo team Hyderabad Polo and Riding Club and was a co-owner of now defunct airline service TruJet.

== Early life and family ==
Ram Charan was born in Madras (now Chennai) in a Telugu family to actor Chiranjeevi and his wife Surekha on 27 March 1985. His family hails from Mogalthur and Palakollu in the West Godavari district of Andhra Pradesh. His maternal grandfather was the noted comic actor Allu Ramalingaiah. He has two siblings — an older sister Sushmita and younger sister Sreeja.

Ram Charan was educated at Padma Seshadri Bala Bhavan, Chennai, Lawrence School, Lovedale, The Hyderabad Public School, Begumpet. He started a Bachelor of Commerce at St. Mary's College, Hyderabad but eventually dropped out. He also attended Kishore Namit Kapoor's acting school in Mumbai. He was presented with an honorary doctorate from Vels University, Chennai in April 2024.

== Acting career ==
=== 2007–2009: Debut and breakthrough ===
In 2007, Charan made his film debut as the leading actor in Chirutha, an action film directed by Puri Jagannadh which completed 50 days in 178 direct cinemas and 15 other shifted cinemas. He played the role of Charan, an ex-convict seeking to kill his father's murderer. Rediff.com praised his performance, stating: "Ram Charan is quite promising. Dance and action appear to be forte. He is rather graceful in the dance numbers. He also stays clear of any oblique reference to his star father by way of dialogue or adopting any particular mannerism or style." His performance in the film earned him the Filmfare Award for Best Male Debut – South and the Nandi Special Jury Award.

After the release of his second film, the fantasy film Magadheera (2009), Charan established himself as one of the leading contemporary actors in Tollywood. The film, in which he played dual roles, was directed by S. S. Rajamouli, and Charan's performance was critically acclaimed. The Times of India stated that "Ram Charan returns as a valiant soldier and breathes life into the larger-than-life role with ease. He showcases his horse-riding and dancing skills to perfection." IndiaGlitz commented: "Charan has come up with a mature performance and he has carried the film very well. Both his characters were done justice, and he reminded of his father at many places." Magadheera grossed over ₹150 crores worldwide and held the record of being the highest-grossing Telugu film until 2013 before it was surpassed by Attarintiki Daredi. The film received six Filmfare Awards including two awards – Filmfare Award for Best Actor – Telugu and the Nandi Special Jury Award for Charan.

=== 2010–2013: Career fluctuations ===
Charan starred in Bommarillu Bhaskar's urban romance Orange in 2010 as Ram, a NRI living in Australia. Although the film didn't perform well at the box office, critics praised the storyline and performance by Charan. Jeevi of Idlebrain felt that Charan didn't try to stick to stardom and is not willing to repeat the mistakes performed by other stars. Over the years, it became a cult film and received appreciation from the audience. In her article for Film Companion, Alekhya Devarakonda compared his character to Howard Roark of 1943 novel The Fountainhead. Following a year-long absence from the screen, he next appeared in Racha (2012), directed by Sampath Nandi. He played the role of "Betting Raj", a gambler. The film completed a 100-day run in 38 centres across Andhra Pradesh on 13 July 2012. Racha's final share for its distributors was ₹45 crore (equivalent to ₹93 crore or US$9.6 million in 2026). His performance in the film earned him acting nominations at the Filmfare and SIIMA award ceremonies. Sify stated, "Both, actor Ram Charan and his director Sampath Nandi play a safe game by following the same pattern of earlier mass-masala movies." Radhika Rajamani of Rediff criticised the plot of the film, but praised Charan's performance in action sequences and dance moves. IndiaGlitz wrote: "He shows flashes of Chiru-ness more than he ever did in the past; be it his baritone or demeanor, he is a megastar in effect. Helped by a strong script, he could have been much better." The film was released on 5 April 2012 and was declared a commercial success.

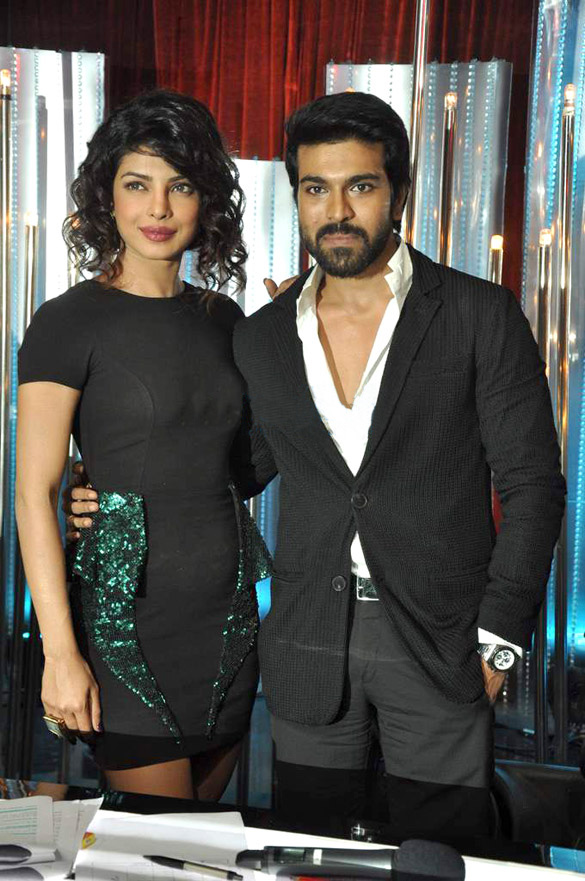
Charan with Priyanka Chopra during promotions of their film Zanjeer in 2013

Charan had two films released in 2013. His first release was Naayak, directed by V. V. Vinayak, in which he played a dual role, once again after Magadheera. Writing to The Times of India, Karthik Pasupulate wrote that "Ram Charan did a great job, though there was no variation shown between the two characters." It opened to mixed critical reviews and became a commercial success. The film brought him two nominations – the Filmfare Award for Best Actor – Telugu and the SIIMA Award for Best Actor (Telugu), once again, with a Best Actor award at TSR – TV9 National Film Awards. The same year he made his Hindi cinema debut alongside Priyanka Chopra in the Telugu-Hindi bilingual film Zanjeer, a remake of the 1973 film of the same name. He played the role of ACP Vijay Khanna who swears vengeance on his parents' killer. Charan made his debut as a playback singer with the song "Mumbai Ke Hero", composed by Chirrantan Bhatt, from the album Thoofan, the Telugu version of Zanjeer. Rediff called it as "an unforgivably bad remake." Film critic Rajeev Masand criticised his performance writing that he "comes off as stiff as a wax statue in his Bollywood debut, with barely any emotion, forget brooding anger." Amid huge expectations, the film became a box-office bomb.

=== 2014–2015: Continued career ===
The following year saw Charan with two releases. Yevadu (2014), directed by Vamsi Paidipally is the third film in which he played the dual role, one who has received a face transplant of the other and becomes the target of underworld gangs because of the mistaken identity. The Central Board of Film Certification gave the film an 'A' certificate because of its violent action sequences. Bangalore Mirror wrote that "For Ram Charan, Yevadu is essential to establish his status after Thoofan tanked at the box office. His character has two shades, and he tries his best to bring variations. He dances like there is no tomorrow and the choreography is a delight to watch." A critic of Sify compared Charan's performance to his earlier films – Nayak and Thoofan and commented that he has done a fairly good job here. Y. Sunita Chowdhary of The Hindu felt that Charan did well in the dance sequences than his acting in the role.

His second release of the same year was the family drama Govindudu Andarivadele. The film features him as a NRI from the United Kingdom. The film opened to mostly positive reviews from critics, and grossed over ₹40 crore (equivalent to ₹70 crore or US$7.2 million in 2026) at the box office. Sangeetha Devi Dundoo commented that he has given his best performance after Magadheera. Similarly Suresh Kaviyarani of the Deccan Chronicle too praised him and cited Charan's performance as "good" and "subtle".

He next played an IB Officer and a stunt performer in the Srinu Vaitla's action comedy film Bruce Lee: The Fighter (2015). Charan hired Priyanka Chopra's trainer Samir Jaura in mid-July 2014 to get into shape for this film by following an intensive training program designed by Jaura, lasting for four-five months along with a strict diet. He also began learning Karate for his role in mid May 2015. For the role, he sported a tattoo of Bruce Lee on his hand. The film collected more than ₹12.66 crore, on its opening day, registering the highest opening day collection of Ram Charan's film. Over days the film didn't performed well at the box office and was declared as a box-office bomb, with a budget of ₹60 crore. Sangeetha Devi Dundoo of The Hindu once again criticised Charan's performance and wrote that "Charan dances like a dream, as always, and shows marked improvement as an actor. But what he needs is a project that will not belittle the huge fan base in the garb of masala."

=== 2016–2018: Commercial success and established actor ===
He next appeared in 2016 the action thriller film Dhruva (2016), where he played as an IPS officer. The film follows the story of Dhruva, an IPS officer who wants to arrest Siddharth Abhimanyu (played by Arvind Swami), a wealthy scientist, who uses secret medical and illegal practices for profit. A remake of the Tamil film Thani Oruvan (2015), the film opened to positive reviews and emerged as a commercial success at the box office, collecting over ₹85 crore (US$8.8 million) in 21 days. Krishna Vamsi of The Indian Express wrote that "From his physique to his fights, he makes you hark back to Magadheera." The Times of India's Srividya Palaparthi added "Ram Charan looks his fittest best. As an actor, Ram Charan impresses in all the scenes that required high emotion. And as for the scenes where he had to be elevated as the hero, they will not disappoint his fans." He performed his own stunts in the film. He received his fourth nomination for the Filmfare Award for Best Actor – Telugu for his performance in the film. Charan made a cameo appearance in "Ammadu Let's Do Kummudu" song from the film Khaidi No. 150 (2017), alongside his father Chiranjeevi, Devi Sri Prasad, and Kajal Aggarwal. The film marked the comeback of his father into the mainstream cinema after Shankar Dada Zindabad (2007).

In 2018, he appeared in the Sukumar's directed period action-drama Rangasthalam, which earned him particular praise for his performance as Chitti Babu, a semi-deaf villager, with several critics deeming it to be his career-best performance. The film also emerged as a major commercial success, becoming the highest-grossing Telugu film of the year, with a gross collection of over ₹216 crores. Set in the 1980s in the Konaseema region of Andhra Pradesh, the film explores various themes including caste-based honour killings, brahminical patriarchy and good versus evil. The film was featured on several year-end best films' charts. Nagarjuna Rao of Gulf News wrote that "There comes a career-best for all actors at some point of time. Rangasthalam could well be Ram Charan's" Subhash K. Jha of The Free Press Journal commented Teja transforms in front of our eyes, adding "It is almost like watching a magic show where the entire appearance of the actor undergoes a sea change as we gawk in open-mouthed amazement." After a long time, Ram Charan won several accolades including his second Filmfare Award for Best Actor – Telugu and the SIIMA Award for Best Actor – Telugu. In her article 5 Best Performances of Ram Charan Teja, S Behara of The Indian Express included Charan's performances in the films Chirutha (2007), Magadheera (2009), Orange (2010), Dhruva (2016) and Rangasthalam (2018). In March 2018, Rajamouli confirmed that Charan would feature as one of the leads alongside N. T. Rama Rao Jr. in his next film.

=== 2019–present: Career expansion ===
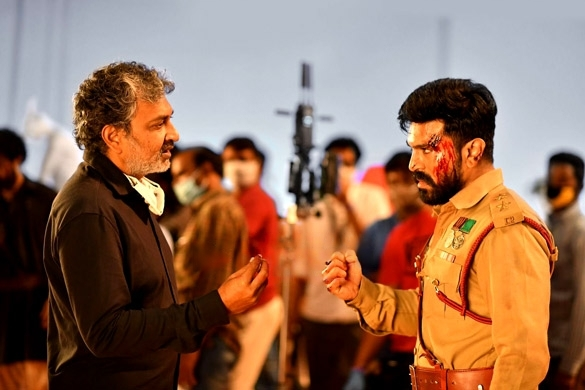
Ram Charan on the sets of RRR with S. S. Rajamouli

He next appeared in the action film Vinaya Vidheya Rama (2019), directed by Boyapati Srinu, alongside Kiara Advani and Vivek Oberoi. The film opened to negative reviews, receiving criticism for the improper action scenes and screenplay, consequently didn't perform well at the box office. Writing for The Hindu, Sangeetha Devi stated: "Whatever made Ram Charan sign up for this loud, mind-numbing film after Rangasthalam? ". India Today's Janani K felt that, Charan need to start from scratch due to the film. As a result of the film's failure at the box office, Charan wrote an open apology to his fans. The same year, in March, it was announced that he would portray Alluri Sitarama Raju in S. S. Rajamouli's directorial RRR, co-starring N. T. Rama Rao Jr. The film was released in March 2022 with widespread acclaim from both Indian and other foreign critics. His performance in the film received particular praise. Shubhra Gupta of The Indian Express wrote "The film casts not just one super-star, but two of them – Jr NTR and Ram Charan. The biggest super-star among them all is SS Rajamouli and the audience also saved the loudest 'taalis' (claps) for him". The film has also become the third highest-grossing Indian film and the second highest-grossing Telugu film worldwide, with him getting a Critics' Choice Super Best Actor in an Action Movie nomination and his third Filmfare Award for Best Actor – Telugu.

He starred alongside his father Chiranjeevi in Acharya (2022) directed by Koratala Siva. Chiranjeevi confirmed that Charan would be doing the role in June 2020.

Ram Charan starred in the film Game Changer, directed by S. Shankar and produced by Dil Raju under Sri Venkateswara Creations. The film was released on 10 January 2025, and received mixed reviews from critics, underperforming at the box office. It became available for streaming on Amazon Prime Video on 7 February 2025.Ram Charan starred in the sports action drama Peddi, directed by Buchi Babu Sana. The film was released on 4 June 2026.

== Other work ==
Charan is an equestrian. The Hans India reported that he had learnt horse-riding in his childhood. In September 2011, he started his own polo team Ram Charan Hyderabad Polo Riding Club. He also served on the board of directors of Maa TV. In 2009, he became a spokesperson for Pepsi's advertisement campaigns.

Turbo Megha Airways Private Limited was incorporated in March 2013, with Charan and Vankayalapati Umesh as promoters. In early July 2015, the airline adopted the brand name TruJet. It received its air operator's certificate for regional operations from the Directorate General of Civil Aviation on 7 July 2015. He is also the spokesman and co-owner of the obstacle running series Devil's circuit.

Charan started his own film production company Konidela Production Company in 2016. The first film produced from the studio is his father Chiranjeevi's 150th film Khaidi No. 150 (2017). The film grossed over ₹164 crore at the box office, on a budget of ₹50 crore. Following the success of the film, he again collaborated with his father and produced Sye Raa Narasimha Reddy (2019) with a production budget of ₹270–300 crore.

In May 2023, he announced a partnership with Vikram Reddy, of UV Creations, to launch the production house, V Mega Pictures. Within the same month, V Mega Pictures announced its collaboration with Abhishek Agarwal Arts, for the production of their first film, The India House, starring Nikhil Siddharth and Anupam Kher as Shyamji Krishna Varma.

In 2025, Charan was selected as the brand ambassador of Archery Premier League.

=== Philanthropy ===
Charan often organises blood donation camps. On 26 May 2021, Charan launched oxygen banks along with his father Chiranjeevi, through Chiranjeevi Charitable Trust. Started initially in Anantapur and Guntur districts of Andhra Pradesh, they were later launched various other regions in India, including Telangana. These were launched due to the shortage of oxygen cylinders, ventilators and concentrators, during the second wave of COVID-19 pandemic in India.

== Personal life ==
Ram Charan is married to Upasana Kamineni, the vice-chairman of Apollo Charity and Chief Editor of B Positive magazine. Kamineni is the daughter of Shobana Kamineni and the granddaughter of Prathap C. Reddy, founder and executive chairman of India's first corporate hospital chain, Apollo Hospitals. They were engaged in December 2011, and subsequently married on 14 June 2012 at the Temple Trees Farm House in Hyderabad. According to an article published by NewsX, both Charan and Upasana were friends until ninth grade in the same school at Chennai, Tamil Nadu. On 20 June 2023, the couple had their first child, a daughter. On 31 January 2026, the couple gave birth to twins – a boy and a girl. The couple has named their newborns as Shivram and Anveera Devi.

=== Religious beliefs ===
Ram Charan takes part in the 41-days-long Ayyappa Deeksha (Vratham), which is done on a yearly basis in Sabarimala, Kerala. He started this practice in 2008. Charan stated that "this spiritual living is like a detox holiday for him to de-stress, take healthy and simple food and maintaining inner peace from his chaotic shooting schedules and uncertain mundane things" and said that his father Chiranjeevi had inspired him in following the deeksha.

== In the media ==
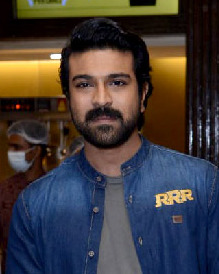
Charan during the promotions of RRR

Charan was featured in GQ India's Best Dressed Men list in 2016. He is popularly referred as the "Mega Power Star" in the media. The title is the combination of "Mega Star" [of his father Chiranjeevi] and "Power Star" [of his uncle Pawan Kalyan]. He has appeared in Forbes India's Celebrity 100 list since 2013. He was ranked twelfth on the Times' 50 Most Desirable Men for the year 2012, twenty-third in 2013, thirtieth in 2014, thirty-eighth in 2015. After a break of three years, he was again featured on the list in 2019 at eighteenth position.

At an event held in January 2016 in Hyderabad, novelist Yandamuri Veerendranath commented that "Charan is surviving on his father Chiranjeevi's popularity". Upon the release of Japanese dubbed version of Magadheera in Japan, Charan received wide popularity in the region. Japanese food company Ezaki Glico printed Charan's photo on their biscuit packets. Belonging to a film family, he admitted that "No two people are born with the same calibre and can achieve the same stardom", regarding nepotism in the film industry. In July 2022, Raveena Tandon said that "Yash, Prabhas and Ram Charan are now pan-Indian names". As of August 2024, he is one of the most-followed Telugu actors on Instagram.
