= Qube Cinema Technologies =

Indian film and television technology company

- Industry: Film, TV Technology
- Predecessor: Real Image Media Technologies
- Founded: Chennai, India (1 January 1986)
- Founder: Senthil Kumar, Jayendra Panchapakesan
- Headquarters: Chennai, Tamil Nadu, India
- Products: Qube XP, Qube Wire, QubeMaster Pro
- Number of employees: 950
- Subsidiaries: Qube Cinema, Inc.
- Website: Official website

Qube Cinema Technologies is an Indian company operating in film and television technology. It provided digital non-linear editing and digital cinema sound to the Indian market in the 1990s. The company then began work in digital cinema products and deployment during the early years of the century.

== History ==
Started in 1986 as Media Artists Pvt. Ltd. in Chennai (then Madras), India, the company was renamed to Real Image Media Technologies Pvt. Ltd. in the early 2000s after the merger of Real Image Pvt. Ltd. and JS Films into Media Artists Pvt. Ltd. Media Artists continued to be a brand of the company's audio post-production facilities until early 2017 but the primary focus of the company then moved to digital cinema and as of January 2018, the company's Qube digital cinema systems were installed in about 3760 screens in India. In 2017, the company was renamed to Qube Cinema Technologies Pvt. Ltd. and in November 2017, it announced the signing of a definitive agreement to merge with UFO Moviez Ltd. but after significant procedural roadblocks in the process at the NCLT Mumbai, the merger was called off in early 2019.

The first technology the company brought to India was computer-based non-linear editing with the Media Composer editing system from Avid Technology in 1993. Subsequently, the company brought digital cinema sound to India in a partnership with DTS in 1995.

In 2005, the company launched its own digital cinema system under the brand name Qube. Qube Cinema, Inc. was set up in the US as a subsidiary of Real Image Media Technologies and markets the digital cinema technology of the parent company worldwide.

Qube Cinema was originally founded by Jayendra Panchapakesan and Senthil Kumar to sell and support technology products for the broadcast and cinema industries in India. Qube Cinema has 7 offices across India and a subsidiary in Los Angeles, Qube Cinema, Inc. The Qube product line is established globally, with about 7,000 installations across 48 countries so far and has digital cinema operations in 4,000 cinema screens across India. In August 2011, Qube provided servers and technical support for the fourth year to the Venice Film Festival.

In March 2011, Qube introduced a 4K integrated media block (IMB) that is Ethernet-based, allowing exhibitors to have their storage servers within or outside of their theater. It allows for central storage in multiplex theatres and is designed to work with any digital projection system that supports an IMB. In September 2011, Qube introduced QubeMaster Xpress 2, for digital cinema mastering.

Starting in 2012, Qube Cinema began installing its d-cinema servers and IMBs in Giant Screen theaters. In January 2012, Qube held the first public demonstration of 4K 3D streaming from a single server when they installed a d-cinema system at the Moody Gardens MG 3D Theater in Galveston, Texas. The transition of the Moody Gardens theater from 70 mm film to digital 3D used a Barco NV projector and Qube XP-I server and Xi IMBs. This installation was followed, in March 2012, by one at the Houston Museum of Natural Science, which became the first commercial installation of the Qube Cinema single-server 4K 3D system when it upgraded the museum's Giant Screen Theatre from 70 mm film to digital cinema. And, in October, Qube Cinema partnered with Global Immersion to install its d-cinema system at the Giant Screen theatre of the Peoria Riverfront Museum. In May 2012, Qube introduced server software capable of synchronizing multiple IMBs, making 4K 3D projection possible for theatre owners. In August 2013, Qube partnered with D3D Cinema to install its single-server True 4K 3D system at the newly renovated Air Force Museum Theater at the National Museum of the United States Air Force. In January 2014, Qube Cinema released software updates that added support for Dolby Atmos surround sound as well as Barco Auro 11.1 sound to its flagship XP-I and XP-D servers.

In November 2014, the company was listed by iSPIRIT (Indian Software Product Industry Roundtable), a non-profit think tank, in its top 30 index of Indian software product companies.

Apart from providing digital cinema in India and selling the Qube digital cinema technology worldwide, the company also masters Indian feature films into the digital cinema format.

Intel Capital, the venture capital arm of Intel Corporation, Nomura, the Japanese bank, and StreetEdge Capital, a U.S. based investment partnership, were amongst the investors in Qube Cinema Technologies.

== EPIQ ==
EPIQ, launched in 2019, is an Indian premium-large-format (PLF) system that competes with IMAX. The auditoriums use Barco 4K RGB laser projection, Dolby Atmos immersive sound and a 1.89-to-1 wall-to-wall screen; selected Indian and Hollywood titles are re-mastered in 4K specifically for the format.

As of July 2025 the following EPIQ sites are in regular operation:

- V EPIQ, Sullurpet, Andhra Pradesh – inaugurated 29 August 2019 and billed as the largest screen in South Asia.
- Broadway Megaaplex, Coimbatore, Tamil Nadu – opened 3 July 2023 and is the largest screen in the state.
- Palaxi Cinemas, Kozhikode, Kerala – Kerala’s first EPIQ auditorium, opened 25 January 2024.
- Radiance Cinema, Madurai, Tamil Nadu – 50 ft × 27 ft “R-EPIQ” screen launched 2 September 2024.
- Vetri E-Square, Thanjavur, Tamil Nadu – India’s first multiplex with two EPIQ auditoria (65 ft × 34 ft and 61 ft × 32 ft), soft-opened January 2025.
- AAA Cinemas, Hyderabad, Telangana – houses the first EPIQ Luxon direct-view HDR LED screen (Screen 2), inaugurated 16 June 2023.
- ART Cinemas, Hyderabad, Telangana – the state's first EPIQ auditorium, opened July 31, 2025.

The EPIQ roadmap includes ten screens across Telangana and Karnataka under a 2024 partnership with Asian Cinemas.

=== EPIQ Luxon HDR LED ===
EPIQ Luxon adapts the PLF branding to a direct-view LED cinema wall that meets emerging DCI HDR brightness and contrast targets. The first installation opened in June 2023 at AAA Cinemas, Hyderabad, and is currently the only commercial LED screen in South India that operates under a PLF label.

== Qube Wire ==
Qube Wire is the company’s cloud-based distribution and KDM platform. It was commercially launched at CinemaCon 2017, offering global KDM automation and optional electronic or hard-drive delivery of DCPs.

- Scale – By early 2025 the network served ‘‘over 5,000’’ cinemas in 51 countries following Qube Cinema’s acquisition of US-based MetaMedia.
- Coverage – Prior to the deal the service already delivered content to 135 countries and generated more than 2.3 million KDMs annually.
- Notable uses – Qube Wire handled the global, sub-one-week distribution of the multi-version blockbuster Baahubali 2 (2017), sending ~200 GB packages to dozens of territories via its peer-to-peer mesh.

The platform is accessible to distributors through a web dashboard and REST API, while exhibitors can ingest content via a lightweight theatre appliance or direct network transfer.
