= Yevadu =

2014 Indian film by Vamshi Paidipally

- Theatrical release poster
- Directed by: Vamshi Paidipally
- Written by: Vakkantham Vamsi; Vamshi Paidipally
- Dialogues by: Abburi Ravi
- Produced by: Dil Raju
- Starring: Ram Charan; Allu Arjun; Shruti Haasan; Kajal Aggarwal; Amy Jackson
- Cinematography: C. Ramprasad
- Edited by: Marthand K. Venkatesh
- Music by: Devi Sri Prasad
- Production company: Sri Venkateswara Creations
- Release date: 12 January 2014
- Running time: 166 minutes
- Country: India
- Language: Telugu
- Budget: ₹35 crores

Yevadu (transl. Who is he?) is a 2014 Indian Telugu-language action thriller film co-written and directed by Vamsi Paidipally. The film stars Ram Charan, Allu Arjun, Shruti Haasan, Kajal Aggarwal and Amy Jackson, with Jayasudha, Sai Kumar, Rahul Dev and Brahmanandam play supporting roles. The film was produced by Dil Raju under the banner Sri Venkateswara Creations. Devi Sri Prasad composed the film's music, while Marthand K. Venkatesh was the film's editor. Vakkantham Vamsi co-wrote the film's script with Paidipally.

The core plot was partially inspired by John Woo's 1997 American film Face/Off, and revolves around two strangers, Satya and Charan. The film was made on a budget of ₹35 crore, and was officially launched on 9 December 2011. Principal photography began on 27 April 2012 and lasted until 22 July 2013. The majority of the film was shot in Visakhapatnam and Hyderabad, mostly in Ramoji Film City, while two songs were shot in Switzerland and Bangkok.

Yevadu was released on 12 January 2014 during the festival of Sankranthi after several delays. The film received positive reviews from critics, and was commercially successful, grossing over ₹89 crore at the box office, with a distributor's share of ₹47.1 crore, becoming one of the highest grossing Telugu films of 2014.

== Plot ==
Young couples Satya and Deepthi, living in Visakhapatnam, are in a threat, after a dreaded don named Veeru Bhai lusts Deepthi. Upon their parents' suggestion, Deepthi and Satya escape and board a bus to Hyderabad, but the bus is stopped unexpectedly and boarded by Veeru's right hand man Deva, Veeru's brother Ajay and his henchman Inspector Sravan. Deva slits Deepthi's throat and killed her in front of Satya, and fatally stabs Satya. Before the three leave, they set fire to the bus, leaving Satya to his death.

However, Dr. Sailaja saves Satya by transplanting a new face, which bring a new life, along with a new face and skin. 10 months later, Satya awakes from his coma, which shocks him as he has a different face. Under the pseudonym as Ram, Satya returns to Visakhapatnam where he meets a model named Sruthi, whom Veeru lusts now. Befriending Sruthi, he takes advantage of his new unknown face, and lures Deva to a under-constructed apartment where Satya kills him. A photo of Deva is discovered by ACP Ashok Varma, which has been marked as 1.

Ram files a report on Deepthi with the police, stating that she has been missing for ten days. Since Sravan knows that Deepthi was killed ten months earlier, he becomes suspicious of Ram and follows him to a mall, where Satya kills him. During the investigation on Sravan's death, Ram presents himself to Varma as an eyewitness. When asked to provide a description of the killer, Ram describes his former face. Ram then manipulates Ajay to fall for Sruthi.

Ram sends some compromising pictures of Ajay and Sruthi to Veeru. Ram then convinces Ajay that the only way for him to be with Sruthi and free from Veeru's ire is to kill him, which would also allow Ajay to gain his brother's position. However, Veeru's henchmen kill Ajay and later Veeru gets killed by Ram after revealing his true identity. He apologizes to Sruthi for using her and departs from Visakhapatnam. On the way, a mysterious person named Raja attacks Satya, but is later killed. Suspecting that the attack might have something to do with his new face, Satya visits Dr. Sailaja. When they meet, Sailaja confesses that she has given Satya the face of her deceased son, Charan; she then goes on to explain the circumstances surrounding Charan's death.

Past: Charan is a happy-go-lucky rich graduate who hangs out with his friends and girlfriend Manju. One of his friends, Shashank, questions the local don, Dharma, regarding his illegal acquisition of lands by exploiting the neighbourhood. Threatened, Dharma kills Shashank, after which Charan begins to raise support among the local population to revolt against Dharma. Again threatened, Dharma approaches another one of Charan's friends, Sharath, promising to establish his political career if he kills Charan.

Charan and Sharath go to Visakhapatnam to attend a wedding. On their return, they board the same bus as Satya and Deepthi. When the bus was stopped, Sharath pulls a knife on Charan and the two engage in a fight. Veeru's men simultaneously enter the bus. Deepthi is killed inside the bus while Charan and Sharath's struggle has led them outside the bus, where Charan is stabbed to death. Charan's body is sent to Sailaja, who after observing Satya's urge to live decides to transplant her son's face onto Satya, rather than simple plastic surgery. Before Sailaja could inform Satya about Charan, Satya had left the hospital.

Present: Leaving Sailaja, Satya visits the neighbourhood, under the guise of Charan. After meeting the locals, he decides to avenge Charan's death. First, he meets Sharath in a political meeting, using the shock of Charan seemingly being alive, makes him kill Dharma. Satya makes the slum people follow Sharath to Dharma's house. Sharath stabs Dharma, who in turn kills Sharath. However, the villagers followed by Satya, teamup and kills Dharma. Later, Satya meets Manju as Charan.

== Cast ==
- Ram Charan / Allu Arjun as Charan / Sathya / Ram
- Shruti Haasan as Manju, Charan / Sathya's girlfriend
- Kajal Aggarwal as Deepthi, Sathya / Charan's girlfriend
- Amy Jackson as Shruthi
- Jayasudha as Dr. Shailaja, Charan's mother
- P. Sai Kumar as Dharma
- Rahul Dev as Veeru Bhai
- Ajay as Ajay, Veeru Bhai's brother
- Murali Sharma as ACP K.Ashok Varma IPS
- Kota Srinivasa Rao as Veeraraju, a corrupt central minister, and Dharma's partner
- Brahmanandam as Brahmi, Satya's illegal tenant
- Shashank as Shashank
- Raja Chembolu as Sharath Kunal
- John Kokken as Deva, Veeru Bhai's aide
- Surya as Venkat, Manju's father
- Vennela Kishore as Kishore, Charan's friend
- Subbaraju as Raja, Dharma's henchman
- Supreeth as Bhukka, Dharma's right hand
- G. V. Sudhakar Naidu as Kaka, local rowdy head who hits Shashank
- Amit Tiwari as Charan's college mate
- Prabhas Sreenu as Kaki, Deva's henchman
- L. B. Sriram as Musloda, Shashank's father
- Chatrapathi Sekhar as Shankar, a reporter
- Surekha Vani as Gayathri
- Raghu Karumanchi as One of the Local Rowdy Group
- Sravan as Inspector Shravan
- Chandra Mohan as Chandra Shekhar Rao, Deepthi's father
- Sana as Lakshmi, Deepthi's mother
- Narsing Yadav as Narasimha, a Property dealer
- Scarlett Mellish Wilson as a bar dancer (cameo appearance in the item song "Ayyo Paapam")
- Jani Master (cameo appearance in the song "Freedom")

== Production ==
=== Development ===
Dil Raju wanted to produce a technically driven film and selected a script written by Vamsi Paidipally. Raju announced the project officially in early October 2011, as well as announcing that Ram Charan would star as the film's protagonist. The project would be produced under the banner Sri Venkateswara Creations, with the details, including its cast and crew, announced shortly thereafter. Before sharing the script with Charan, Paidipally worked on it for nearly two months, choosing the action genre after having directed family dramas like Brindavanam (2010). Devi Sri Prasad was confirmed as the film's music director in early November 2011, marking his first collaboration with both Paidipally and Charan. The music sittings were held at Goa.

The film's production was officially launched on 9 December 2011, in Hyderabad; the film's title was announced as Yevadu and a first look poster was unveiled on the same day. Paidipally based his screenplay from a story written by Vakkantham Vamsi. Anand Sai was the film's art director and completed his work by September 2013. Abburi Ravi contributed to the dialogues. C. Ram Prasad was the film's cinematographer, while Marthand K. Venkatesh was the film's editor.

=== Casting ===
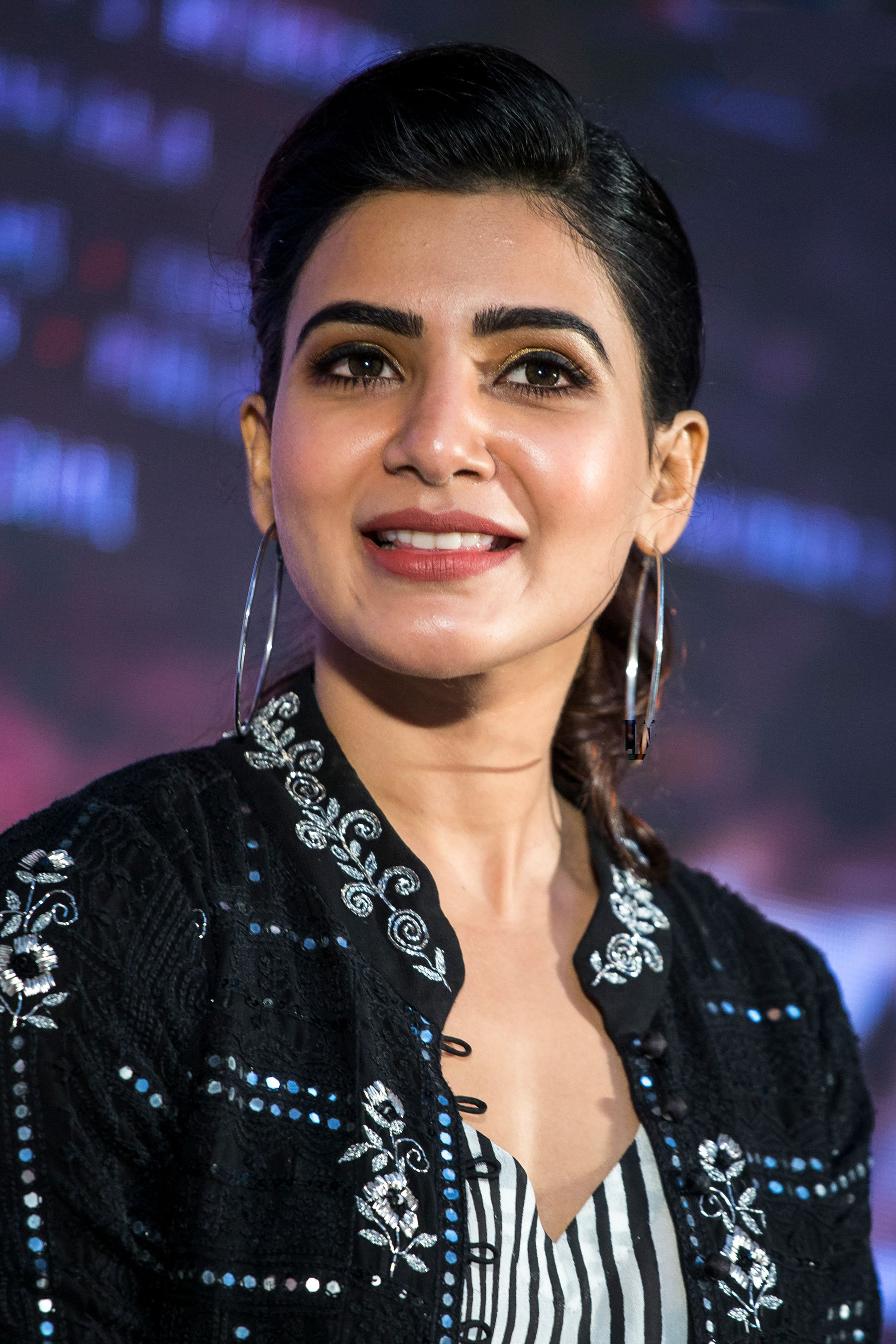
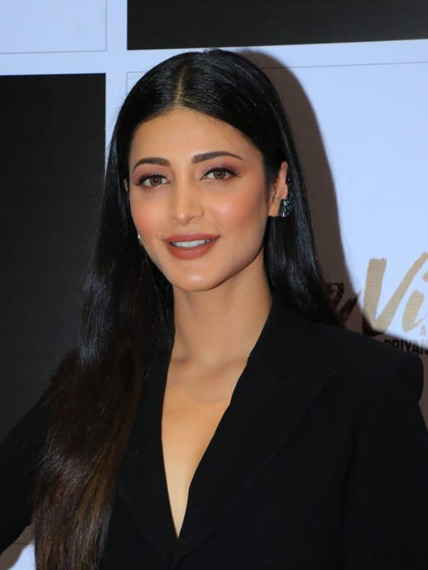
Samantha Ruth Prabhu (top) was cast as the main female lead but was subsequently replaced by Shruti Haasan (bottom) due to creative differences.

Ram Charan was signed as the protagonist in the film in October 2011. Allu Arjun was cast for a crucial cameo appearance along with Kajal, in a role which would bring a twist in the film; the producers wanted an energetic and spirited actor in the part. Samantha Ruth Prabhu was selected to play the female lead to be paired with Charan, and was expected to join the production in October 2012. For the other pairing with Charan, in his alter-ego role, Amy Jackson was selected to play the role of Sruthi. This marked her debut in Telugu cinema, and she participated in various workshops to prepare herself for the role before joining the shoot. Jackson revealed that she was afraid to be seen as a glamorous young woman aiming to be an actress; she worked hard to get her diction right and called the workshop an orientation programme to get her used to the Telugu language. For her role, she practised yoga, functional training, and went for jogs in and around Bandra bandstand in Mumbai, before rejoining the film's sets in Hyderabad.

Kajal Aggarwal was signed for a cameo appearance and was paired with Arjun. Her inclusion was in doubt due to scheduling conflicts, but she eventually accepted the role, calling it a short and sweet one. Shweta Bhardwaj was approached to perform an item number in early May 2012, which she confirmed the news at the time, but added that although she was approached, she was not officially cast in the film. Scarlett Mellish Wilson was selected for an item number, which was supposed to be her first in Telugu; However the film, Cameraman Gangatho Rambabu, was released earlier, making it her debut.

Samantha walked out of the project in mid-November 2012 due to creative differences. She was subsequently replaced by Shruti Haasan, who was reportedly paid a remuneration of ₹60 lakh, but her participation was delayed due to scheduling problems. P. Sai Kumar was signed as the main antagonist. Lyricist Sirivennela Seetharama Sastry's second son, Raja, was signed for a supporting role. Arjun's character in the film was reported to be severely injured in a fight and was to be presented as Charan after repeated plastic surgeries to his face. His character's name was revealed as Sathya, and it was speculated that he would be a police officer in the film. Murali Sharma was selected for a supporting role. Shashank and Prabhas Sreenu were seen in cameo roles.

=== Filming ===
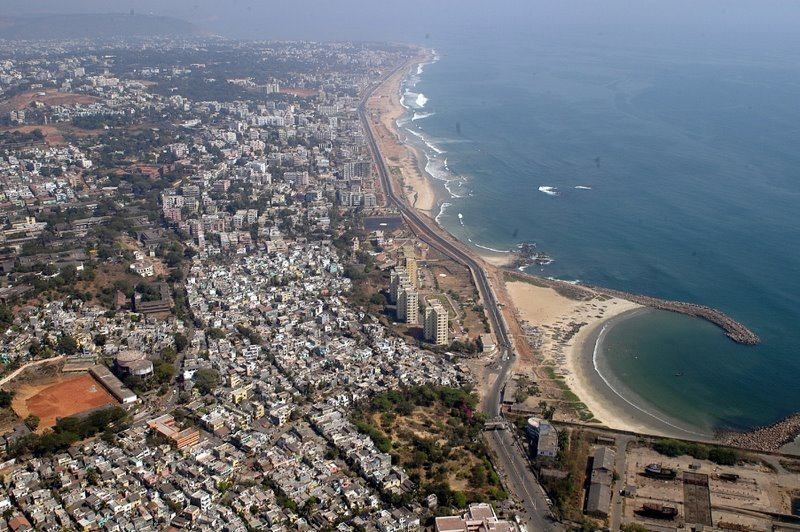
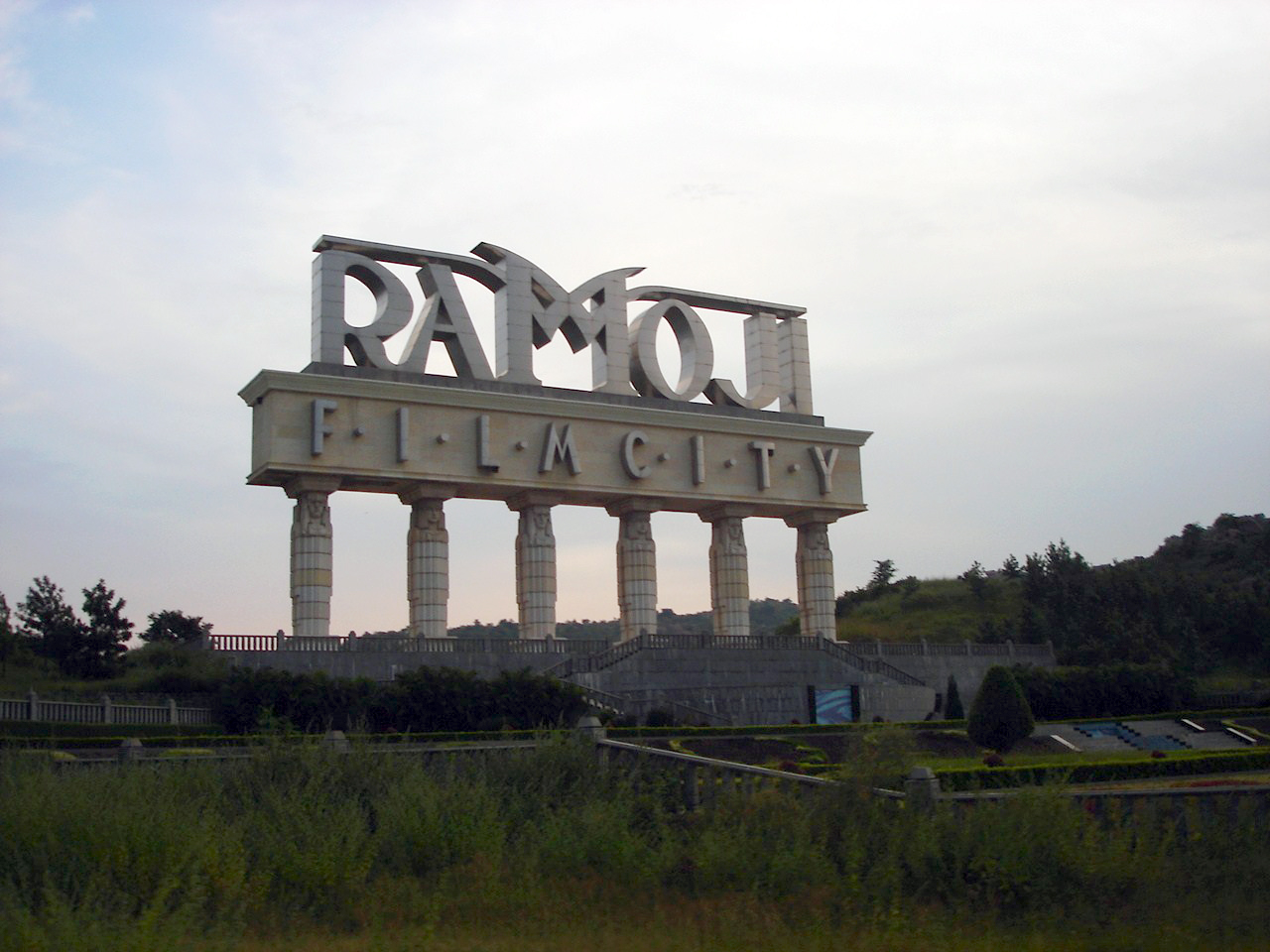
Visakhapatnam (top) and Ramoji Film City (bottom), where the film was significantly shot

Principal photography began on 27 April 2012. Ram Charan was involved in two projects simultaneously, Yevadu and Zanjeer (2013). After completing initial filming on Zanjeer, Charan joined the cast and crew of Yevadu on 8 May 2012, to shoot the item number, as well as scenes featuring him, Amy Jackson, and others. After this first phase of production, Charan was scheduled to go back to Bangkok to complete the filming schedule of Zanjeer, before rejoining the Yevadu production on 7 August 2012. Filming continued in Hyderabad until mid-September 2012 after which production moved to Visakhapatnam on 14 September 2012. By early October 2012, 40 percent of the film was completed, consisting mostly of the first half. Shruti Haasan joined the film's sets on 24 January 2013.

After a short break, filming recommenced on 5 March 2013, and by the end of the month, 90 percent of the film's speaking sequences were completed. Several action sequences were shot at Ramoji Film City in mid April 2013, under the supervision of Peter Hein. By then, the portions containing Arjun and Aggarwal were almost complete. The film's team left for Switzerland on 20 May 2013, to film a song sequence. Charan and Haasan were on location in Zurich, Switzerland to film one of the songs, which was completed by 27 May 2013.

Primary filming recommenced on 29 May 2013, in Hyderabad, with Amy Jackson rejoining the production. The filming was expected to be wrapped up by 20 June 2013. In mid-June 2013, a song featuring Charan was shot at Keesara Stretch, Ramoji Film City. Later, a song choreographed by Shekhar, and featuring Charan and Haasan was shot at Annapurna 7 Acres Studio. Meanwhile, a song featuring Charan and Jackson was shot in Bangkok. The song Freedom which was choreographed by Johnny, was shot in early July 2013 at Ramoji Film City.

Principal photography came to an end on 22 July 2013 after the completion of Haasan's scenes. However, in mid-August 2013, some parts of the film were reportedly re-shot and new scenes were added, in an effort to speed up the pace of the film, after the completion of censor formalities.

== Themes and influences ==
Despite the film's writer, Vamsi, denying it in early June 2013, many critics believed the film was heavily inspired from John Woo's 1997 action film, Face/Off, as well as bearing similarities to the Telugu films Chatrapathi (2005) and Vikramarkudu (2006), both directed by S. S. Rajamouli. While critic Sangeetha Devi Dundoo called the film a combination of Face/Off and Vikramarkudu, another critic, Karthik Pasupulate, wrote, "This movie this isn't a rip off of Face/Off. We don't have filmmakers who have the required creativity and technical know how to make half decent adaptation of that 1997 action thriller. The director just borrows the central idea to dish out another silly revenge drama."

== Music ==
Devi Sri Prasad composed the film's soundtrack, which consists of six songs. Ramajogayya Sastry penned the lyrics for two songs, while Sirivennela Seetharama Sastry, Chandrabose, Krishna Chaitanya and Sri Mani each wrote the lyrics for one song. Aditya Music acquired the audio rights. The release of the soundtrack was postponed multiple times, due to the delay in the film's release. Later, the audio was officially launched at Shilpakala Vedika in Hyderabad on 27 September 2013 where the star crew of the film attended the launch with Chiranjeevi as the main guest.

The audio received positive reviews. The Times of India gave a review stating "Devi Sri Prasad has come up with an album that is high on the beat and low on melody but plays to the galleries unabashedly, blending multiple genres. Though there isn't one stand-out song, the album has an overriding happy vibe about it. It isn't a record that you will cherish for long, but might just swing along while it lasts" and rated the album 3/5.

== Release ==
=== Theatrical ===
The film was initially slated for a 14 July 2013 release, which was Charan's first wedding anniversary. After few delays, the film's release date was announced as 31 July 2013 to coincide with the fourth anniversary of Ram Charan's 2009 film Magadheera. After several delays, the film was rescheduled to open the same day as Pawan Kalyan's Attarintiki Daredi, but was postponed again to 21 August 2013. The Central Board of Film Certification gave the film an 'A' certificate because of its violent action sequences. However, due to protests in Seemandhra over the Telangana State formation, the release of both the films were delayed. Raju scheduled the release on either Diwali or Christmas 2013, again postponing the release from 10 October to avoid another release conflict with Attarintiki Daredi. Due to piracy issues, Attarintiki Daredi released on 27 September 2013 which forced Yevadu to enter the theatres as a December release.

Dil Raju confirmed that the film's original and Malayalam dubbed version would release simultaneously on 19 December 2013. Regarding the film's release, Dil Raju said "I'm planning to release the film on Dec 19 if the Telangana bill is not passed. I haven't decided on postponing the film, but if the bill is passed and it is likely create some agitation, then I plan to release the film during Sankranti next year in January". The makers announced that the movie would release on 10 January 2014, however during the theatrical trailer launch, the makers announced the new release date as 12 January 2014 a Sankranti release clashing with 1: Nenokkadine, Veeram and Jilla at the worldwide box office. Sathyam Cinemas distributed the film in Chennai, where it released in 16 screens. A special paid premier show was held on 11 January 2014 at 9:00 pm and the money made from the premier show was donated to the construction of Lord Venkateswara Swamy temple in Mallepally.

Bhadrakali Prasad acquired the film's Tamil dubbing rights under his banner Bhadrakali Films. The Tamil dubbed version was titled Magadheera after the 2009 Telugu film of the same name. The film's dubbing activities commenced in July 2015.

=== Marketing ===
The film posters were designed by Anil and Bhanu of AB Core Design. The first-look poster was unveiled on 24 March 2013, featuring Charan with a rugged look. The first-look teaser of 36 seconds was unveiled on 27 March 2013. The theatrical trailer was launched on 27 September, along with the film's soundtrack, and received a positive response from the audience. The promos for the songs "Nee Jathaga Nenundali", "Oye Oye" and "Pimple Dimple" were released on 10, 25 and 31 October 2013, respectively. The 16 second promo for the song "Freedom" was unveiled on 31 December 2013, which received positive reviews.

Dil Raju started the film's promotional activities 12 days before the film's release, and planned an advertisement campaign on television, newspapers, magazines, and movie portals. Charan released the second trailer of 85 seconds on 3 January 2014, at the Sandhya 70MM theatre in RTC X Roads. Hindustan Unilever became associated with the film by paying ₹1 crore for co-branding activity in terms of hoardings, television, radio, and print. MediaCorp did the marketing tie-ups for the film. The film's official app was launched on 5 January 2014. While promoting the film, Shruti Haasan was admitted to the Apollo Hospital in Hyderabad, and underwent treatment for suspected food poisoning. The promo of the song "Cheliya Cheliya" was unveiled on 7 January 2014.

The film's crew visited Tirumala Temple on 17 January 2014, and made obeisance to Venkateswara, before interacting with the audience at Group Theatres. A press meet addressing the audience was held at Vijayawada on the next day, with Vamsi, Dil Raju, Sai Kumar, Shashank, L. B. Sriram, Raja and others in attendance. The promo of the song "Ayyo Paapam" was unveiled on 13 March 2014.

=== Controversy ===
The All India Film Employees Confederation mandated that all regional film productions employ at least 70 per cent local stuntmen. When the Chennai stunt masters, FEFSI Vijayan and Stunt Silva, failed to comply with this mandate, Andhra Pradesh stuntmen obstructed the film's production.

K. Nagendra Prasad, a former councillor of Yemmiganur in Kurnool district, lodged a complaint with the police regarding a poster, alleging that it featured an image of a half-nude Amy Jackson. Suits were filed, naming Ram Charan, Amy Jackson, Dil Raju, the film's presenter Anitha, co-producer Sirish, the photographer, and the owner of the Raghavendra theatre which screened the film, citing section 292 of the IPC, as well as section 3 of the Indecent Representation of Women (Prohibition) Act of 1986. Vamsi defended that Jackson's still used in the poster was from a song sequence which had no obscenity in it and called the charges baseless. Justice K. G. Shankar of the High Court stayed the criminal cases on 28 July 2014.

Just before the release of Race Gurram (2014), stills of Shruti Haasan from the song Pimple Dimple, taken from obscene angles, were leaked on the internet. Shruti received huge criticism for the photos, while some called it a cheap publicity stunt. Regarding them, she said that those stills were neither pre-approved by the production house nor her and were shot during a song shoot and called the leakage a breach of trust. She filed a FIR in Hyderabad. CID began investigation in May 2014. They questioned administrators of the websites which uploaded the photos, and the photographers who reportedly supplied the photos to them. However, it was uncertain whether uploading the photographs, since they were taken in a public place, could be termed as illegal, and sought a legal opinion on how to go about the investigation.

=== Home media ===
The film's television rights were acquired by Star Maa for an undisclosed price. The film registered a TRP rating of 10.14 during its television premiere. The television rights of the dubbed Malayalam version, Bhaiyya My Brother, were sold to Mazhavil Manorama for ₹65 lakh, which was the highest price ever paid for a Telugu film dubbed in Malayalam. The Indian DVD and Blu-ray were marketed by Aditya Videos, and were released in June 2014. The television rights for the Hindi version were sold to Sony Max.

== Reception ==
=== Box office ===
==== India ====
The film became the biggest opener for Ram Charan by collecting ₹8.65 crore on its first day, making the film with the fourth highest opening day grosses of all time, surpassing 1: Nenokkadine. While the film's trade witnessed a drop on its second day, earning ₹4 crore, it improved on its third day, earning ₹4.5 crore, bringing its three-day total to ₹17.38 crore, overtaking the totals of 1: Nenokkadine and Ramayya Vasthavayya (2013). The film collected a distributor share of ₹20 crore in four days at AP Box office. The film collected ₹27.85 crore in six days, surpassing the first week share of Seethamma Vakitlo Sirimalle Chettu, and was expected to surpass its first week worldwide share of ₹33.5 crore. The film also established a first week record in Nellore, and the east and west areas of Andhra Pradesh and Karnataka, by collecting ₹1.63 crore, ₹2.67 crore, ₹2.22 crore and ₹4.06 crore, respectively. However, it missed a first week record in Ceded and Visakhapatnam by a small margin. It also took the second spot in the list of the top 10 films with highest first week shares from AP.

The film collected ₹33.75 crore in 9 days, and more than ₹6 crore from other areas, including Karnataka, the rest of India, and overseas territories, enabling it to cross the ₹40 crore mark at the worldwide Box office, becoming Ram Charan's fourth film to cross that mark. The film grossed ₹35.5 crore in 11 days. The film collected ₹36.32 crore by the end of its second week at the AP Box office and ₹44 crore worldwide. The film collected ₹37.6 crore in 16 days at AP Box office, and was expected to reach the ₹50 crore mark worldwide. The film completed a 25-day run in early February 2014, collecting more than ₹38 crore at the AP Box office. The film collected ₹39.34 crore at the AP Box office and ₹47.1 crore worldwide during its lifetime, and was declared as one of the Ram Charan's biggest hits.

==== Other territories ====
According to Taran Adarsh, the film collected ₹1.46 crore in its opening weekend in the United States. In its first five days in the US, the film collected ₹2.2 crore. By the end of its second week, the film's performance was disappointing; and it only collected a total of $330,000 as of 20 January 2014, while 1: Nenokkadine collected $1 million during that same span of time. Overseas, the film grossed a total of ₹1.7 crore share during its lifetime.

=== Critical response ===
According to International Business Times India, the film received "decent feedback" from critics.

Y. Sunita Chowdary of The Hindu felt that the film was made only for the mass audience. She criticised the film's revenge sequences, calling them "non-stop and prolonged" but praised Devi Sri Prasad's music and C. Ram Prasad's cinematography. Sridhar Vivan of Bangalore Mirror gave the film 3 out of 5 stars and wrote, "For those watching Yevadu, the first half ends quite shockingly as the director tries to wrap up the movie in the first leg itself. It is a treat for Cherry's fans and for others, it's strictly average stuff". He felt that the violence, lack of comedy and a predictable turn of events affected the film's narration.

Sify also rated the film 3 out of 5 and wrote, "Yevadu provides novelty in the beginning episodes promising a different commercial film but ends up as a regular revenge drama. Has many clichéd moments but it is also a film that works to some extent. A masala fare".

Karthik Pasupulate of The Times of India was yet another to rate the film 3 out of 5, but he criticised its blatant similarities to Face/Off. He added that the action choreography was "undecipherable" and called Sai Kumar's character as "one of the most over the top villain characters ever" adding that he would certainly "break the outer limit of the human hearing threshold".
