= List of Telugu films of 2014 =

This is a list of Telugu-language films released in the year 2014.

== Box office ==
Highest-grossing films of 2014
Rank	Title	Production company(s)	Worldwide gross	Share	Ref.
1	Race Gurram	Sri Lakshmi Narasimha Productions	₹110 crore (US$11 million)	₹59.4 crore	
2	Yevadu	Sri Venkateswara Creations	₹89 crore (US$9.2 million)	₹47.1 crore	
3	Govindudu Andarivadele	Parameswara Art Productions	₹72 crore (US$7.5 million)	₹41crore	
4	Legend	14 Reels Entertainment Vaaraahi Chalana Chitram	₹61 crore (US$6.3 million)	₹39.4 crore	
5	Manam	Annapurna Studios	₹62 crore (US$6.4 million)	₹40crore	
6	Aagadu	14 Reels Entertainment	₹61 crore (US$6.3 million)	₹34.15 crore	
7	1: Nenokkadine	14 Reels Entertainment	₹51 crore (US$5.3 million)	₹28.95 crore	
8	Rabhasa	Sri Lakhsmi Narasimha Productions Sri Sai Ganesh Productions	₹47 crore (US$4.9 million)	₹27.75 crore	
9	Power	Rockline Entertainments	₹45 crore (US$4.7 million)	₹26 crore	
10	Alludu Seenu	Sri Lakshmi Narasimha Productions	₹43 crore (US$4.5 million)	₹24.55 crore	

== January–June ==
Opening		Title	Director	Cast	Production house	Ref
J A N	1	Celebrity	KVM Krishna	Ammu Prasad, Viswadha, Bindu, Deepesh Reddy, Sai Kanth	VMoksha Media	
J A N	1	Kshatriya	K. Uday Chandu	Srikanth, Kumkum, Kota Srinivasa Rao, Rao Ramesh	AVM Movies	
J A N	10	1: Nenokkadine	Sukumar	Mahesh Babu, Kriti Sanon	14 Reels Entertainment	
J A N	12	Yevadu	Vamsi Paidipally	Ram Charan Teja, Allu Arjun, Kajal Agarwal, Shruti Hassan, Sai Kumar, Amy Jackson	Sri Venkateswara Creations	
J A N	12	Manasunu Maaya Seyake	Suresh P Kumar	Prince, Sethu, Richa Panai, Disha Pandey, Manobala	Full House Entertainment	
J A N	24	Love You Bangaram	Goverdhan Reddy	Rahul Haridas, Shravya		
J A N	25	Emo Gurram Egaravachu	Chandra Siddhartha	Sumanth		
J A N	31	Heart Attack	Puri Jagannadh	Nithiin, Adah Sharma	Puri Jagannadh Touring Talkies	
J A N	31	Pandavulu Pandavulu Tummeda	Sriwass	Mohan Babu, Manchu Vishnu, Manchu Manoj, Raveena Tandon, Hansika Motwani, Pranitha Subhash	Sree Lakshmi Prasanna Pictures	
J A N	31	Medaram Jathara	Sheshidhar	Suman	Bellam Suresh Babu	
F E B	7	Paisa	Krishna Vamsi	Nani, Catherine Tresa, Siddhika Sharma, Charanraj, Bharath Reddy, Tabar	Yellow Flowers	
F E B	7	Malligadu Marriage Bureau	Uday Raj	Srikanth, Brahmanandam, Manochitra	Haritha Entertainments	
F E B	7	Dil Deewana	Thumma Kiran	Raj Arun Reddy, Rohit Reddy, Abha Singhal, Neha Deshpande	Sri Bhavana Films	
F E B	14	Hum Tum	Ram Bimana	Manish, Simran, Nikhil Chakravathi, Aishwariya, M. S. Narayana, Dharmavarapu Subramanyam	Apple Studios	
F E B	14	Love Dot Com	Raja Vannem Reddy	Arya Sandeep, Neethi Taylor, Dharmavarapu Subramanyam	Franch Pictures	
F E B	21	Naa Rakumarudu	T. Satya	Naveen Chandra, Ritu Varma	Harivillu Creations	
F E B	21	Alibaba Okkade Donga	Phani Prakash	Ali, Suja Varunee, Allari Naresh (Voice-over)	Kamal Cine Creations	
F E B	28	Bhimavaram Bullodu	Udayasankar	Sunil, Ester Noronha	Suresh Productions	
F E B	28	Basanti	Chaitanya Dantuluri	Raja Goutham, Alisha Baig	Start Camera Pictures	
M A R	7	Bangaru Kodipetta	Raj Pippalla	Navdeep, Swati Reddy, Santhosh, Ram	Guru Films	
M A R	7	Nuvve Naa Bangaram	Ram Venky	Sai Krishna, Sheena Shahabadi, Nisha Kothari, Suman	Sri Dhanalakshmi Movies	
M A R	7	To Let 4 Bachelors Only	Ramana Geddam	Kiran, Kalyan, Bharadwaj, Madhu, Sirisha, Latha, Narasing	Kingdom Movies	
M A R	14	Hang Up	Hyder Bilgrami	Sudhakar Komakula, Natalie Rout		
M A R	14	Yuddham	Bharathi Ganesh	Tarun Kumar, Yami Gautam, Srihari	Vishaka Talkies	
M A R	15	Hrudayam Ekkadunnadi	Vi Anand	Krishna Madhav, Anusha, Samskruthy Shenoy	Kriti Media; Hima Creations	
M A R	21	Veta	Ashok Alle	Tarun Kumar, Srikanth, Jasmin Bhasin, Madhurima	Teja Cinemas	
M A R	21	Savior	Irene Thalluri	Noel Sanjith, Siyona Sneha, Johnny Lever, Surya, Rama Prabha, Goutham Raj, Melkote	Jesus Saves Souls Ministries	
M A R	28	Eduru Leni Alexander	Raja Reddy	Taraka Ratna, Komal Jha, Kumkum	P. L. K. Productions	
M A R	28	Legend	Boyapati Srinu	Nandamuri Balakrishna, Jagapathi Babu, Radhika Apte, Sonal Chauhan, Kalyani	14 Reels Entertainment, Varahi Chalana Chitram	
M A R	28	Boy Meets Girl Tholiprema Katha	Vasanth Dayakar	Siddharth, Nikkitha, Kanika Tiwari	Sri Dhanalakshmi Movies	
M A R	28	Special Class	K. R. Venki	Harish, Ananya Thakur, Vaibhav, Allari Subhashini	Swasthik Films	
A P R	4	Rowdy	Ram Gopal Varma	Mohan Babu, Vishnu Manchu, Jayasudha, Shanvi	24 Frames Factory; A. V. Pictures	
A P R	4	Vichakshana	Deepak Nyathi	Dheeraj, Padmini, Nandeeshwar Goud, Jayapradha, JayaLakshmi, Surender Goud, PadmaJayanthi, Mukesh, Rizwan, Dharmender	Asha Ram Creations	
A P R	4	Hrudaya Kaleyam	Steven Shankar	Sampoornesh Babu, Ishika Singh, Kavya Kumari	Amrutha Productions	
A P R	11	Race Gurram	Surender Reddy	Allu Arjun, Shruti Hassan, Shaam, Ravi Kishan, Prakash Raj, Mukesh Rishi, Brahmanandam	Sri Lakshmi Narasimha Productions	
A P R	18	Laddu Babu	Ravi Babu	Allari Naresh, Poorna, Bhumika Chawla, Brahmanandam, M. S. Narayana, Ali	Maharadhi Films	
A P R	18	Avatharam	Kodi Ramakrishna	Richard Rishi, Radhika Kumaraswamy, Bhanupriya	Arundhathi Art Films	
A P R	18	Prathighatana	Tammareddy Bharadwaja	Charmy Kaur, Reshma Rathore, Raghu Babu, Posani Krishna Murali, Krishna Bhagawan	Charita Chitra	
A P R	18	Prabhanjanam	Bhaskara Rao Vendrati	Ajmal Ameer, Sandesh, Aarushi, Panchi Bora, Nassar, Kota Srinivasa Rao	Chaitanya Art Creations	
A P R	25	Chandamama Kathalu	Praveen Sattaru	Krishnudu, Lakshmi Manchu, Chaitanya, Saikumar, Naresh	AK Entertainers	
A P R	25	Prathinidhi	Prashanth Mandava	Nara Rohit, Shubra Aiyappa, Sree Vishnu, Kota Srinivasa Rao, Jaya Prakash Reddy, Posani Krishna Murali, Ravi Prakash	Sudha Cinemas	
A P R	25	Galata	Krishna	Srinivas, Haripriya, Saikumar, Nagendra Babu, Ali	Creative Pixels	
M A Y	1	Anaamika	Sekhar Kammula	Nayantara, Vaibhav Reddy, Pasupathy	Endemol India	
M A Y	1	Kotha Janta	Maruthi	Allu Sirish, Regina Cassandra, Posani Krishna Murali, Rao Ramesh	Geetha Arts	
M A Y	9	Hrudaya Kaleyam (Re-released)	Steven Shankar	Sampoornesh Babu, Ishika Singh, Kavya Kumari	Amrutha Productions	
M A Y	10	April Fool	Krishnaswamy Srikanth Iyengar	Jagapati Babu, Bhoomika Chawla, Gulshan Grover, Randhir Reddy	Kartaal Productions	
M A Y	10	Pyar Mein Padipoyane	Ravi Kumar Chavali	Aadi, Shanvi Srivastava	Sri Sathya Sai Arts	
M A Y	17	Amrutham Chandamamalo	Gunnam Gangaraju	Srinivas Avasarala, Harish, Vasu Inturi, Sivanarayana, Dhanya Balakrishna, Suchitra	Just Yellow Media	
M A Y	23	Manam	Vikram Kumar	Akkineni Nageswara Rao, Nagarjuna, Akkineni Naga Chaitanya, Shriya Saran, Samantha	Annapurna Studios	
M A Y	30	Green Signal	Vijay Maddhala	Revanth, Shilpi Sharma		
M A Y	31	Prema Geema Jantha Nai	Subbu R. V.	Sreeram Chandra, Mannara Chopra, Chalapathi Rao, Bhanuchander	Subham Creations	
J U N	1	Kamalatho Naa Prayanam	Narasimha Nandi	Sivaji, Archana Veda Sastry		
J U N	6	Ulavacharu Biryani	Prakash Raj	Prakash Raj, Sneha, Urvashi, Samyuktha Horanadu	Duet Movies	
J U N	6	Veedu Chaala Worst	Venkat Pampana	Taraka Ratna, Nandan, Neeraj, Swapna	S.L.N.S Films	
J U N	13	Jump Jilani	E. Satti Babu	Allari Naresh, Isha Chawla, Swathi Deekshith, Posani Krishna Murali, Raghu Babu	Venkateshwara Art Productions	
J U N	13	Jabilli Kosam Akasamalle	Raj Narendra	Sri Hari, Anoop Tej, Smrithika Acharya	UV Creations	
J U N	20	Oohalu Gusagusalade	Srinivas Avasarala	Naga Shourya, Rashi Khanna	Varahi Chalana Chitram	
J U N	20	Maine Pyar Kiya	Pradeep Madugula	Pradeep Ryan, Isha Talwar, Madhumitha	Unify Entertainers	
J U N	27	Autonagar Surya	Deva Katta	Naga Chaitanya, Samantha Ruth Prabhu, Saikumar	Sri Venkateswara Creations	
J U N	27	Inka Emi Anukoleduu	Sreekara Babu	Rahman, Deshpathi, Shreeraj, Archana		

== July–December ==
Opening		Title	Director	Cast	Production house	Ref
J U L	4	Ra Ra... Krishnayya	Mahesh. P	Sundeep Kishan, Jagapathi Babu, Regina Cassandra, Kalyani, Tanikella Bharani	SVK Cinemas	
J U L	4	Aa Aiduguru	Anil Gurudu	Kranthi Kumar, Tanishq Reddy, Kranthi Reddy, Shashi, Krishna Teja	Prem Movies	
J U L	11	Drushyam	Sripriya	Venkatesh, Meena, Nadhiya, Naresh	Suresh Productions, Rajkumar Theaters Pvt Ltd., Wide Angle Creations	
J U L	12	Ice Cream	Ram Gopal Varma	Navdeep, Tejaswi Madivada	Bheemavaram Talkies	
J U L	25	Alludu Seenu	V.V. Vinayak	Bellamkonda Sreenivas, Samantha, Prakash Raj, Pradeep Rawat, Brahmanandam	Sri Lakshmi Narasimha Productions	
A U G	1	Run Raja Run	Sujeeth	Sharwanand, Seerat Kapoor, Adivi Sesh, Sampath Raj, Jayaprakash	UV Creations	
A U G	1	Adavi Kaachina Vennela	Akki Vishwanadha Reddy	Arvind Krishna, Meenakshi Dixit, Richard Rishi, Pooja Ramachandran	Moonlight Dreams	
A U G	1	Maaya	Neelakanta	Harshvardhan Rane, Avanthika, Nagababu	Shirdi Sai Combines	
A U G	1	Gallo Telinattunde	D. Venkat Suresh	Ajay, Kousalya	CH. Vamsi Krishna Srinivas, Venkat Rao	
A U G	1	Chatting	T.S.Kamal	Abhinaya Krishna, Sunitha	Sidduluri Lavanya, Chandrasekhar	
A U G	8	Galipatam	Naveen Gandhi	Aadi, Erica Fernandes, Kristina Akheeva	Sampath Nandi Team Works	
A U G	8	Nuvvala Nenila	Trinadha Rao Nakkina	Varun Sandesh, Poorna	Amogh Creations	
A U G	8	Janmasthanam	Om Sai Prakash	Sai Kumar, Roopika, Pavani	Suvan Rai Productions	
A U G	9	Geethanjali	Raj Kiran	Anjali, Brahmanandam, Srinivasa Reddy	M.V.V.Satyanarayana	
A U G	15	Lovers	Harinath	Sumanth Ashwin, Nanditha	Maya Bazaar Movies	
A U G	22	Nee Jathaga Nenundali	Jaya Ravindra	Sachiin J Joshi, Nazia Hussain, Rao Ramesh	Parameswara Art Productions	
A U G	22	Kiraak	Harik Devabhakthuni	Aniruddh, Chandini Tamilarasan	Hit Talk Pictures	
A U G	29	Rabhasa	Santosh srinivas	Jr. NTR, Samantha Ruth Prabhu, Pranitha Subhash, Brahmanandam, Sayaji Shinde	Sri Lakshmi Narasimha Productions	
S E P	5	Boochamma Boochodu	Revan Yadu	Sivaji, Kainaz Motivala, Brahmanandam, Posani Krishna Murali	Sneha Media and Hezen Entertainments	
S E P	5	Ganpati Bappa Morya	Ramu Kumar ASK	Srinadh, Rajasekhar, Mallesh, Riteesh		
S E P	5	Raj Mahal	Appaji Konda	Suryanath, Sravan, Jeeva, Surya, Tarjan, Sandeepthi, Ria	Ch. Suryanath	
S E P	5	Weekend Love	Nagu Gavara	Thrigun; Supriya Shailja; Srihari; Srinivasa Reddy; M. S. Narayana	Dristhi Entertainments	
S E P	12	Power	K. S. Ravindra	Ravi Teja, Hansika, Regina Cassandra, Brahmanandam, Prakash Raj, Mukesh Rishi, Sampath Raj, Ajay, Subbaraju, Harish Uthaman	Rockline Venkatesh	
S E P	12	Boy Friend Leni Ammayi Unda	Shiva Nagu	Bhavani Agarwal, Mega Supreme, Kanchana Maitra	Lakkaraju Radha Rajeshwari	
S E P	13	Anukshanam	Ram Gopal Varma	Vishnu Manchu, Navdeep, Tejaswi Madivada, Madhu Shalini, Revathi	Vishnu Manchu	
S E P	19	Aagadu	Srinu Vaitla	Mahesh Babu, Tamannaah, Sonu Sood, Rajendra Prasad, Ashish Vidyarthi, Nassar, Brahmanandam	14 Reels Entertainment	
S E P	26	Loukyam	Sriwass	Gopichand, Rakul Preet Singh, Brahmanandam, Mukesh Rishi, Rahul Dev, Sampath Raj	Bhavya Creations	
O C T	1	Govindudu Andarivadele	Krishna Vamsi	Ram Charan, Kajal Agarwal, Srikanth, Prakash Raj	Parameswara Art Productions	
O C T	10	Romeo	Gopi Ganesh	Sairam Shankar, Adonika, Ravi Teja	Dorai Swamy	
O C T	10	Paathasala	Mahi V. Raghav	Nandu, Anu, Priya, Sirisha, Sai Kiran, Shiva, Sashaank	Rakesh Mahankali, Pavan Kumar Reddy	
O C T	10	Dikkulu Choodaku Ramayya	Trikoti	Naga Shourya, Sana Makbul, Ajay, Indraja	Varahi Chalana Chitram	
O C T	17	Oka Laila Kosam	Vijay Kumar Konda	Naga Chaitanya, Pooja Hegde	Annapurna Studios	
O C T	24	Karthikeya	Chandoo Mondeti	Nikhil Siddharth, Swati Reddy, Tanikella Bharani, Rao Ramesh, Kishore, Jayaprakash	Magnus Cine Prime Banner	
O C T	31	Current Theega	Nageshwara Reddy	Manchu Manoj, Rakul Preet Singh, Jagapati Babu	24 Frames Factory	
N O V	7	Jaihind 2	Arjun Sarja	Arjun Sarja, Simran Kapoor, Surveen Chawla, Rahul Dev	Sri Rama Films International	
N O V	7	Brother of Bommali	B. Chinni Krishna	Allari Naresh, Karthika Nair	Siri Cinema	
N O V	7	Joru	Kumar Nagendra	Sundeep Kishan, Rashi Khanna, Priya Banerjee, Brahmanandam, Sayaji Shinde	Ashok	
N O V	7	Parampara	Madhu Mahankali	Naresh, Aamani, Raavi Kondala Rao	Dhruthi Media Limited	
N O V	9	Poga	Shankar Marthand	Navdeep, Madhu Shalini		
N O V	14	Erra Bus	Dasari Narayana Rao	Manchu Vishnu, Catherine Tresa, Brahmanandam, Dasari Narayana Rao	Taraka Prabhu Films	
N O V	14	Pilla Nuvvu Leni Jeevitham	A. S. Ravi Kumar Chowdhary	Sai Dharam Tej, Regina Cassandra, Jagapati Babu, Prakash Raj, Sayaji Shinde	Geetha Arts; Sri Venkateswara Creations	
N O V	14	Atreya	Shanthikumar Chilumula	Aditya, Anuhya, Sri Raj, Jeeva, Meenakshi	START Help Foundation Dotcom Art Creations	
N O V	21	Ice Cream 2	Ram Gopal Varma	J. D. Chakravarthy, Naveena, Tanikella Bharani, Jeeva	Tummalapalli Rama Satyanarayana	
N O V	21	Rowdy Fellow	Krishna Chaitanya	Nara Rohit, Vishakha Singh, Nandini Rai, Rao Ramesh	T. Prakash Reddy	
N O V	21	Naa Bangaaru Talli	Rajesh Touchriver	Siddique, Anjali Patil, Lakshmi Menon, Rathna Shekar Reddy	Sun Touch Productions	
N O V	21	33 Prema Kathalu	Siva Ganesh	Vivek, Sunitha Marasiar, Sravani	Friends Film Profiles	
N O V	28	Yamaleela 2	S. V. Krishna Reddy	Dr.K.V.Satish, Diah Nicolas, Sadha, Mohan Babu, Brahmanandam, Nisha Kothari, Sayaji Shinde, Ali, Ashish Vidyarthi	Krishvi Films	
N O V	28	Rough	C. H. Subba Reddy	Aadi, Rakul Preet Singh, Srihari, Raghu Babu	Sridevi Entertainments	
N O V	28	Ala Ela	Aneesh Krishna	Rahul Ravindran, Bhanu Sri Mehra, Vennela Kishore, Shaani Salman, Khushi, Heebah Patel	Ashoka Creations	
N O V	28	Sri Vasavi Kanyaka Parameswari Charitra	Sripada Ramachandra Rao	Suman, Ramya Krishna		
D E C	5	Chakkiligintha	Vema Reddy	Sumanth Ashwin, Rehana	Mahi's Entertainments Pvt Ltd	
D E C	5	Lakshmi Raave Maa Intiki	Nandyala Ravi	Naga Shourya, Avika Gor	World Cinema	
D E C	5	The End	Rahul Sankrityan	Yuva Chandraa, Sudhir Reddy, Gazal Somaiah, Pavani Reddy	Friday Films	
D E C	5	Vundile Manchi Kalam Mundu Mundura	Arun Daasyam	Sudhakar Komakula, Avantika Mohan	Aam Aadmi Pictures	
D E C	12	Choosinodiki Choosinanta	Anil Vatupalli	Sivaji, Nagendra Babu, Leslie Tripathy		
D E C	13	Ee Varsham Sakshiga	Ramana Mogili	Varun Sandesh, Haripriya	Rahul Movie Makers	
D E C	13	Saheba Subramanyam	Sasikiran Naryana	Dilip Kumar, Priyanka Gor, Rao Ramesh	Indo English Productions	
D E C	19	Panchabhoothalu Sakshiga	Kalicharan Maadina	Kalicharan, Manashwini, Chitram srinu, Bindu	Sri Jagannadha Creations	
D E C	19	O Manishi Katha	Radha Swamy Avula	Jagapati Babu, Kalyani	Om Shiv Films	NA
D E C	24	Mukunda	Srikanth Addala	Varun Tej, Pooja Hegde, Prakash Raj	Leo Productions	
D E C	25	Chinnadana Nee Kosam	A. Karunakaran	Nithiin, Mishti, Nassar, Naresh, Sithara, Ali	Shresht Movies	

== Notable deaths ==
Important personalities who died during the year
Month	Date	Name	Age	Profession	Notable films	Ref.
January	22	Akkineni Nageswara Rao	89	Actor, Producer	Maya Bazaar, Samsaram, Bratuku Theruvu, Aradhana, Donga Ramudu, Dr. Chakravarthi, Ardhaangi, Mangalya Balam, Illarikam, Shantinivasam, Velugu Needalu, Dasara Bullodu, Bharya Bhartalu, Dharmadata, Batasari, College Bullodu, Sitaramayyagari Manavaralu	

== See also ==
- List of Telugu films of 2013
- Lists of Telugu-language films
- List of Telugu films of 2015
