= Balupu =

2013 Indian film by Gopichand Malineni

- Film poster
- Directed by: Gopichand Malineni
- Screenplay by: Gopichand Malineni
- Story by: Kona Venkat; K. S. Ravindra
- Produced by: Prasad Vara Potluri
- Starring: Ravi Teja; Shruti Haasan; Anjali; Prakash Raj
- Cinematography: Jayanan Vincent
- Edited by: Gautham Raju
- Music by: S. Thaman
- Production company: PVP cinema
- Release date: 28 June 2013
- Running time: 143 minutes
- Country: India
- Language: Telugu

Balupu (transl. Arrogance) is a 2013 Indian Telugu-language action comedy film written and directed by Gopichand Malineni. The film is produced by Prasad Vara Potluri under his PVP cinema banner. The film stars Ravi Teja, Shruti Haasan, Anjali, and Prakash Raj along with Adivi Sesh, Ashutosh Rana, and Brahmanandam in supporting roles.

Released on 28 June 2013, the film went on to become a major commercial success at the box office, grossing over ₹61 crore with a distributor's share of ₹30 crore. It was the seventh highest-grossing Telugu film of 2013 and became Ravi Teja's highest-grossing movie up until that point until the release of Krack, which was also directed by Mallineni and also had Haasan alongside Teja. S. Thaman also returned to compose the music.

Balupu was remade in Bengali as Herogiri (2015). Balupu is currently set to be remade in Kannada as Trishulam.

== Plot ==
Ravi works as a collection agent of ICICI bank in Bangalore and leads a happy life along with his friends and his father Mohan Rao. Mohan Rao wishes to see Ravi married soon although Ravi is against it. One day, Ravi is informed that one of his friends, Seenu has attempted suicide. Upon inquiring, Ravi finds out that his friend fell in love with a girl named Shruti. Shruti and her uncle Crazy Mohan, have a habit of cheating gullible young men in the name of love - including Seenu. Ravi decides to teach them a lesson.

Ravi enters their life as a gullible youngster after Shruti "falls in love with him", he starts torturing them. Crazy Mohan's attempts to make Ravi go away prove in vain. Crazy Mohan hatches a plan, telling Shruti to ask Ravi to marry her, thinking that Ravi will get cold feet and they would be rid of him. Ravi, guessing their next move, also comes with a marriage proposal to Shruti. The pair, then, approach Mohan Rao and tell him that Ravi is in love with Shruti and that he has proposed to her. They assume that this would enrage Mohan Rao, but Mohan Rao accepts the proposal heartily. However, Shruti was already engaged to Rohit by her father sometime in the past. Their entire act of "cheating gullible young men" was just so that Shruti could have fun spending the last few days before getting married while Crazy Mohan can profit from it. One day, Ravi saves Shruti from some goons and finally comes clean to Shruti as he believes that things have gone too far. He advises her not to play with people's feelings in future. Shruti finds herself falling in love with Ravi and informs Ravi's father Mohan Rao.

Mohan Rao leaves the final decision to Shruti's father and guarantees that they would not face any problem in the future from Ravi, whatever the decision on their proposal. On the other hand, Rohit's mother, in a fit of anger warns Shruti that she would torture her after the marriage. Listening to both of them, Shruti's father, realizes his mistake and fixes Shruti's marriage with Ravi. A humiliated Rohit's mother calls her brother Poorna, a dreaded don in Vizag. After arriving at the wedding venue with his henchmen, Poorna recognises that Ravi and Mohan Rao are his former nemesis Shankar and Nanaji. While Ravi is fighting with the goons, Poorna stabs Mohan Rao, kidnaps Shruti and flees away to Vizag. After admitting Mohan Rao to the hospital, Ravi starts narrating his past.

Past: Nanaji was a dreaded gangster with an established crime empire in Vizag, while Poorna was still trying to establish his own regime. In view to destroying Nanaji's empire, Poorna takes the help of Shankar, a young upstart, and makes him a partner-in-crime. Shankar, with his aggressiveness and cleverness, starts destroying the empire of Nanaji. Meanwhile, he falls in love with Dr. Anjali, without knowing the fact that she was Nanaji's daughter. Shankar lies to her that he is a struggling musician and soon Anjali reciprocates his love. Knowing this, Poorna's elder son Babji, who always had a grudge against Shankar, attempts an attack on Anjali, only to be killed by Nanaji. At this point, she learns about Shankar's true identity. She pleads to both Shankar and Nanaji to leave the syndicate, and Shankar agrees.

Enraged by his son's death, Poorna instructs Shankar to kill Nanaji and Anjali. However, Shankar refuses and informs him that he has decided to quit. Kaasi, Poorna's younger son, advises Poorna to inform Nanaji that Shankar has kidnapped Anjali and will kill her. Nanaji, angered by this news, gathers his men and rushes to kill Shankar. Meanwhile, Shankar, having truly given up crime and wishing to marry Anjali, decides to approach Nanaji along with Anjali to seek his blessings. Nanaji on spotting them both, rushes to meet them head on. Kaasi too arrives at the same spot with his own men and attacks Nanaji's men. Thinking that they are all in league with Shankar, Nanaji retaliates and soon a feud takes place. In the ensuing chaos, Kaasi shoots Anjali, fatally wounding her. Enraged, Shankar promptly kills Kaasi and rushes to the hospital with Anjali. Anjali with a few moments left, reveals the truth to her father and requests him to leave the life of crime. Nanaji and Shankar, overcome with grief at the loss of Anjali's death, decide to leave Vizag for Bangalore to lead a normal life as Ravi and Mohan Rao.

Present: Shruti's father rushes to the hospital and tells Ravi/Shankar that Shruti is kidnapped by Rohit. Ravi reaches Vizag and orchestrates a plan and with the help of Shruti, Mohan Rao/Nanaji, Dr. Savitri and his friends, Ravi manages to kidnap Rohit. Poorna along with Shruti, reaches the spot where they are to make an exchange of Rohit for Shruti. However, after the exchange, Poorna reveals that he never believed in Ravi's act and he just went along with his story to trap Ravi and Mohan Rao. A final fight ensues and Ravi finally defeats Poorna, and tells him to leave the life of crime, and marries Shruti.

== Cast ==
- Ravi Teja as Ravi / Shankar alias Balupu Shankar
- Shruti Haasan as Shruti
- Anjali as Dr. Anjali
- Prakash Raj as Mohan Rao / Nanaji (Ravi's adopted father and Anjali's father)
- Adivi Sesh as Rohit (Shruti's fiancé) and Poorna's Nephew
- Ashutosh Rana as Vizag Poorna
- Brahmanandam as Crazy Mohan alias Fulka
- Ali as Dr. Savitri
- Nassar as Shruti's father
- Brahmaji as Suri
- Sana as Rohit's mother
- Adithya Menon as Ranga, Nanaji's brother
- Raghu Babu as Nanaji's henchman
- Rao Ramesh as A. R. Naidu
- Srinivasa Reddy as Ravi's friend
- Venu as Ravi's friend
- Jaya Prakash Reddy as CI Basava
- Ajay as Babji
- Shafi as Kaasi
- Chatrapathi Sekhar as Shekhar
- Satyam Rajesh as Seenu, Ravi's friend
- Supreeth as Poorna's henchman
- Prabhas Sreenu as Rohit's henchman
- Fish Venkat as Poorna's henchmen
- Raghu Karumanchi as Poorna's henchmen
- AVS
- Surekha Vani
- Praveen as Ravi's friend
- Gundu Sudarshan as Mohan Rao's friend
- Thagubothu Ramesh as Shankar 's Die heart Fan
- Archana Shastry as herself
- Lakshmi Rai as herself (special appearance in song "Lucky Rai")

== Production ==
=== Development ===
Gopichand Malineni and Ravi Teja together announced that their collaboration is set for a new film whose name was revealed later. In August 2012, it was announced that the filming would begin from October 2012. The film's muhurtam was held on 26 October 2012 in a quiet ceremony held at producer Potluri's office. A few of the film's songs were canned in Lisbon, Portugal thus making it the first Telugu film shot in Portugal. In an interview to the Portugal media, Ravi Teja, Shruti Haasan and Gopichand Malineni thanked the Portugal tourism board and the local crew for their support. In May, Gopichand Malineni responded about the delay in the film's shooting, stating "Balupu has been delayed due to fight masters and fighters union problems. Now Ram-Laxman masters have got Hyderabad union card and we are on the way." For the first time in his career, Ravi Teja sang a song, thus making this film his debut as a singer, adding yet another feather in his cap. As on 4 June, The post-production works were reported to be running in full-swing at breakneck speed.

=== Casting ===
Ravi Teja was signed to play the protagonist and his role was said to be a highly energetic one with a rugged look sporting a beard, similar to his look in his previous film Venky. This film was the next film of Ravi Teja with PVP Cinemas after the 2003 film Veede. Shruti Haasan has been recruited to play one of the female leads opposite Ravi Teja. She told IndiaGlitz that she would be playing a comedy role in the film and this will be her first attempt at comedy. For the first time in her career in Tollywood, she will be seen in a glamorous role. S. Thaman, who previously worked with Gopichand Malineni for Bodyguard, was recruited as the music director for this project. Kona Venkat penned the script for the film. In October, Anjali was recruited as the second female lead, after signing for Seethamma Vakitlo Sirimalle Chettu. After impressing everyone as a spoilt-brat in Panjaa, Adivi Sesh was recruited for a pivotal role in this film. Apparently, It was reported that Anjali is playing the role of a medical student in this film. Ashutosh Rana, who previously worked with Ravi Teja for Venky, was recruited to play one of the antagonists. Brahmaji was also recruited to play a vital role in the film. Meanwhile, Brahmanandam's character name was revealed to be "Crazy Mohan" and his role was said to be one of the biggest assets of the film. In May, it was reported that Lakshmi Rai would make a special appearance in the film. In June, it was reported that prominent Telugu comedian Ali would essay the role of Dr. Savitri, a male/female doctor, which was said to be one of the highlights of the film.

=== Filming ===
The film shooting started on 13 November 2012 and had a silent shoot and in December, the film has completed its first schedule in which the scenes between Ravi Teja, Bramhanandam and Sruthi Hassan were shot. In the end of December, it was reported that shooting is currently progressing near Simhachalam and it was reported that the film is reportedly set in the backdrop of Vizag and some important scenes are being shot right now on Ravi Teja and Anjali. Later, it was told that the film has completed about 50% of the shoot and the work is going on at a good pace.

The next schedule started in Hyderabad in January 2013 where scenes featuring Ravi Teja and Shruti Haasan were shot, which was confirmed by the actress on Twitter. The film's shooting was put on hold temporarily due to Gopichand Malineni's wedding and after a brief gap, the film's next schedule began in the end of February at Hyderabad, where some important scenes were canned between Ravi Teja and Shruti Haasan. In March, the song "Patikella Chinnadi" was shot on Ravi Teja and Shruti Haasan in Ramoji Film City and sources reported that Shruti Haasan will be seen in glamorous attire in that song. After the song's completion, the unit had its shoot at Appa Junction in Hyderabad for some crucial scenes at a very fast pace. After the completion of the major schedules, The film unit proceeded for the shooting of the remaining songs. Later it was known that few songs would be canned in Lisbon, the capital city of Portugal. After a shoot of ten days in Lisbon, the unit moved to Algarve, a region in the southern part of Portugal, to shoot a couple of songs on Ravi Teja and Shruti Haasan. After completing 2 songs under the choreography of Raju Sundaram, The unit returned from Portugal nearly on 20 April 2013.

The final schedule began at Hyderabad in the month of May. On 18 May, Some scenes were canned at Lingampally railway station in Hyderabad. After completion of the schedule nearly on 18 May, the unit proceeded to Bangkok for canning some crucial scenes. After completing a long schedule in Bangkok, the unit resumed its shooting in Nanakramguda, where some crucial scenes on Ravi Teja and Shruti Haasan were shot. The film unit then canned the song "Lucky Lucky Rai" on Ravi Teja and Lakshmi Rai at Bangkok. It was informed that Sekhar master is choreographing that song and shooting will go on till 15 June, with which the shooting of the film will be complete. Finally, shooting came to an end on 15 June.

== Soundtrack ==
Balupu

Soundtrack album by S. Thaman
- Released: 1 June 2013
- Recorded: 2012–2013
- Genre: Feature film soundtrack
- Length: 19:53
- Language: Telugu
- Label: Junglee Music
- Producer: S. Thaman

S. Thaman chronology
Tadakha (2013)	Balupu (2013)	Pattathu Yaanai (2013)

The music was composed by S. Thaman. This film marks Thaman's second venture with Gopichand Malineni after Bodyguard and also his sixth venture with Ravi Teja. Sirivennela Sitaramasastri and Bhaskarabhatla penned the lyrics for the songs. Ravi Teja also sung a song in this film. The film had its audio launch in Hyderabad International Convention Centre at Hyderabad on 1 June 2013.

Track list
No.	Title	Lyrics	Artist(s)	Length
1.	"Kajal Chellivaa"	Bhaskarabhatla	Ravi Teja, S. Thaman	3:54
2.	"Evaindho"	Sirivennela Sitaramasastri	S. P. Balasubrahmanyam, Geetha Madhuri	4:03
3.	"Lucky Lucky Rai"	Bhaskarabhatla	M. M. Manasi, Simha	3:52
4.	"Padipoyanila"	Anantha Sreeram	Megha, Suchith Suresan	3:07
5.	"Pathikella Chinnadi"	Bhaskarabhatla	Mika Singh, Ranina Reddy	4:00
6.	"Hello Boys and Girls"	Bhaskarabhatla	Ravi Teja	0:57
Total length:				19:53

=== Reception ===
The audio got a positive response. APHerald.com gave a review stating "Over all Balupu audio sounded as a mix of a new and old track from Thaman’s previous movies." Telugucinema.com gave a review stating "All in all, Balupu is different in Thaman's repertoire and has songs that are easy to like. Thaman has come up with songs that would help the film. Has mass numbers as well as a melody number. The right mix of songs. Best album in Ravi Teja's career in the recent times."

== Release ==
Initially, the film was slated for a worldwide released on 302 screens on 21 June 2013. But due to delays in post-production of the film, the release date was shifted to 28 June 2013. The film would have a premiere on 27 June 2013 in all the overseas countries. Though it was rumoured that the film would be delayed further, the unit confirmed its release on 28 June 2013. The film was submitted to the Central Board of Film Certification on 24 June 2013. The film was awarded an A certificate by the Board after the objectionable dialogue was removed. The film released in 70 screens across USA, making it the biggest release of Ravi Teja there. With a massive release in AP, the film was also released in and around Chennai on 16 Screens.

=== Marketing ===
It was reported in the first week of January that the first look posters and stills would be released on 26 January 2013, thus coinciding with Ravi Teja's birthday, but the logo and teaser of Balupu were launched at a function organized in Marigold Hotel at Greenlands, Hyderabad on 25 January 2013. Ravi Teja launched the teaser, while PVP's executive director Rajeev Kamineni launched the logo. The audio launch was held on 1 June 2013 at HICC Novotel in Hyderabad. It was organised by Shreyas Media, a popular event organizing company. The cost of organizing was ₹ 3.5 million, which was well-received, both in terms of TRP's and public response, making it one of the successful events organized by them. For the first time ever, Ravi Teja and Shruti Hassan performed live on stage along with S. Thaman, which elevated the event to Bollywood and Hollywood standards. The theatrical trailer, which was released on the same day generated an unusually positive response from the public. From 18 June 2013, the character sketches of Ali, Srinivasa Reddy, Satyam Rajesh, Pradeep, Thagubothu Ramesh, Ashutosh Rana, Lakshmi Rai, Adivi Sesh, Anjali, Prakash Raj, Shruti Haasan, Brahmanandam, Ravi Teja were displayed at idlebrain.com, the official web partners of the film in images with a countdown till 28 June 2013 which was told as a unique promotion. Moreover, the posters of the film were decorated on 3 trains, covering all parts of Andhra Pradesh nearly on 26 June 2013, which was also a unique promotion activity.

=== Pre-release revenues ===
Noted producer and distributor Dil Raju bought the Nizam area rights of the film for a reported fancy prize. The overseas rights were secured by BlueSky for a fancy price. Zee Telugu bought the satellite rights of the film. The Australian distribution rights of this film, along with Sahasam, were secured by Sai Manali and Lorgan Entertainment. The film had a great pre-release business in USA, with 33 centers in USA were closed within 48 to 72 hours of press note and remaining in final stages of closing, with all Non USA centers closed as on 21 June 2013.

=== Controversy ===
On 20 June 2013 Mr. Dronamraju Ravikumar, representative of the A. P. Brahmana Seva Sangha Samakhya, alleged that the trailer of the film contained derogatory remarks against Brahmins. The representatives of Brahmin organizations demanded the removal of trailers from all TV channels, thus submitting a formal complaint to the Censor Board and the Film Chamber with an intention of necessary action by the Censor Board since the film was not censored by that time. On the other hand, Gopichand Malineni stated that his intention was not to hurt anyone's feelings but just to conclude the controversy in a positive manner in this film and concluded saying that the Brahmin organizations are invited to watch the film before it gets censored. After showing the film to the irked community, the producer of the film sent a letter to Regional Censor Board Officer stating that he is going to delete the entire scene from the film to avoid controversies.

=== Reception ===
Jeevi of idlebrain.com gave a review of rating 3.25/5 stating "Ravi Teja whose previous hit was released in January 2011 didn't find success at the box office despite having seven films in a span of 2 and half years. Balupu will provide oxygen to his career. Balupu has all ingredients with a dominating portion of entertainment to become a decent hit. You can watch it." The Times of India gave a review stating "The first half of the film looks pretty entertaining with good comedy, emotions and interval bang. Kona Venkat's comic drama style coupled with Gopichand Malineni's well-shot action sequences hogged the limelight in the second half, where the story gets into the flash back. Powerful dialogues, emotions and nice comedy might engage the audience." APHerald gave a review of rating 2.25/5 stating "Balupu is not a complete action entertainer, but watchable once for Ravi Teja-Brahmi comedy."

=== India ===
The film had a good start at the domestic box office, collecting ₹38.9 million (US$400,000) on its first day. The film collected a share of ₹93.1 million (US$970,000) in 3 days, with a collection of ₹26 million (US$270,000) on the second day and ₹28 million (US$290,000) on the third day in Andhra Pradesh. The film collected ₹ 4025,000 in 3 days in Tamil Nadu, which is the highest collection for a Ravi Teja film in Tamil Nadu till date, hence being declared a Super Hit at both Andhra Pradesh and Tamil Nadu Box offices respectively, breaking Ravi Teja's previous records held by Kick, Don Seenu and Mirapakay. The film continued its pace by collecting ₹150 million (US$1.6 million) at the end of the first week and with steady collections in the second week even after finding a stiff competition from Singam, the successful dubbed version of Suriya's Singam II. The film completed a successful 50 day run in 85 direct centers, collecting a gross of over ₹550 million (US$5.7 million) all over the state.

=== Overseas ===
At the US box office, the film collected ₹05.6 million (US$58,000) in three days, entering the list of the top 20 grossers in the US at 18th position, minting more than Ghanchakkar, which was released on more screens and collected ₹03.1 million (US$32,000). The film collected ₹17.6 million (US$180,000) in its first weekend, which was more than the closing businesses of his previous hits; Kick (with ₹11.9 million (US$120,000)), Don Seenu (with ₹12.6 million (US$130,000)) and Mirapakay (with ₹14.8 million (US$150,000)) respectively. The film continued its pace in spite of heavy competition from other big releases by collecting ₹26 million (US$270,000) at the end of the second week, however failing to beat the record set by Baadshah, which collected ₹40 million (US$420,000) at that point of time, however subjected to the number of screens it was released. The film collected a total of ₹26.9 million (US$280,000) at the end of its third week.

== Remake ==
The film which was being remade in Kannada as Ravichandra starring Upendra and Ravichandran was shelved after partial completion of shooting. However, the movie was re-launched with title Trishulam. In 2015, the film was remade in Bengali as Herogiri.
