= Gopichand Malineni =

Indian filmmaker (born 1980)

- Born: Gopichand Malineni; 13 March 1980 (age 46); Boddulurivaripalem, Andhra Pradesh, India
- Occupations: Film director, screenwriter
- Years active: 2010-present
- Spouse: Sri Satya (m. 2013)

Gopichand Malineni (born 13 March 1980) is an Indian film director and screenwriter who works in Telugu cinema. After working as an assistant director in many films, Malineni made his directional debut in 2010 with the action comedy film Don Seenu. He went on to direct films such as Bodyguard, Balupu, Pandaga Chesko, Winner, Krack and Jaat.

== Early life ==
Gopichand Malineni was born and brought up in Boddulurivaripalem village near Ongole of Prakasam district, Andhra Pradesh. His family hails from the same village. His primary education was done at Sarada Niketan School Prakasam District and upper primary at VR College in Nellore. He discontinued his education in 12th class and entered the film industry shortly afterwards. His friends and family were a huge support to him then. He married Sri Satya on 14 February 2013. His son, Satvik, made his acting debut in Krack (2021) as a child actor.

== Career ==
In his early career, Malineni worked as a Camera assistant for programmes telecast by ETV in Warangal. He was appreciated for his work in ETV News.

Malineni started his career in the film industry as a camera assistant for the movie Hello I Love You directed by Veera Shankar. He then worked as an assistant in the direction department for the movie Police starring Srihari in the lead role. He worked for four films with Srihari and later worked with E.V.V. Satyanarayana for two films, with Sreenu Vaitla in Venky (2004), Andarivaadu (2005), Dhee (2007), with A. R. Murugadoss in Stalin (2006), with Sriwass in Lakshyam (2007), and Meher Ramesh in Kantri (2008) and Billa (2009).

He made his directorial debut with Don Seenu starring Ravi Teja and Shriya Saran in the lead and it was one of the biggest hit films in 2010. In 2012 he directed Bodyguard with Venkatesh and Trisha on the lead. In 2013 he directed a film Balupu starring Ravi Teja, Shruti Haasan and Journey fame Anjali under the production of PVP Cinema, this movies was known as the comeback film of Ravi Teja. The film was released on 28 June 2013. Balupu was Malineni's second film with Ravi Teja after Don Seenu. The film received positive reviews from critics. and was successful at the box office. Later, Malineni established his name in the industry with other hits like, Pandaga Chesko, starring Ram Pothineni and Rakul Preet Singh in lead roles. This movie was another hit for Malineni and a comeback for Ram Pothineni. In 2017, Malineni made a flop with Winner starring Sai Dharam Tej and Rakul Preet Singh in lead role.

== Filmography ==
Key
†	Denotes films that have not yet been released

Film
Year	Film	Notes
2010	Don Seenu	Also credits for story and co-screenplay
2012	Bodyguard	Remake of Body Guard; also credits for screenplay
2013	Balupu	
2015	Pandaga Chesko	
2017	Winner	Also credits for screenplay
2021	Krack	Also credits for story and screenplay
2023	Veera Simha Reddy	Also credits for story and screenplay, Santosham Best Director Award
2025	Jaat	Debut in Hindi cinema; also credits for story and co-screenplay
2026	Dada †	

Cameo appearances

- Stalin (2006)
- Lakshyam (2007) as sales person
- Winner (2017) as biker
