= Rama Rama Krishna Krishna =

- Official film poster
- Directed by: Sriwass
- Produced by: Dil Raju
- Starring: Ram Pothineni; Arjun; Priya Anand; Bindu Madhavi
- Narrated by: Jr. NTR
- Cinematography: Sekhar V. Joseph
- Edited by: Marthand K. Venkatesh
- Music by: M. M. Keeravani
- Production company: Sri Venkateswara Creations
- Distributed by: Sri Venkateswara Creations
- Release date: 14 May 2010
- Running time: 161 minutes
- Country: India
- Language: Telugu

Rama Rama Krishna Krishna is a 2010 Telugu language action comedy film directed by Sriwass of Lakshyam fame and produced by noted producer Dil Raju. It stars Ram Pothineni, Arjun, Priya Anand and Bindu Madhavi in the lead roles, whilst Vineet Kumar, Nassar, Brahmanandam, Pragathi and Sayaji Shinde play pivotal roles with Gracy Singh appears in a cameo appearance. The music was composed by M. M. Keeravani with cinematography by Sekhar V. Joseph and editing by Marthand K. Venkatesh. Upon the film's release on 14 May 2010, it received mixed reviews with critics mainly praising Pothineni's and Sarja's performance. It fared well at the box office.

== Plot ==
The movie starts in Mumbai when mafia leader Ashok Deva is on an unending war with his opponent Pawar. Deva has a cute family with two sisters Sirisha and Priya, wife Gauthami, and right-hand man Shiva. Gauthami is killed by Pawar and his group on her birthday, and she takes a last word from her husband to leave this violence and lead a peaceful life away from mafia.

Deva respects her words. He, his sisters, and Shiva leave to a small village called Gandhipuram in East Godavari district to start a new life, but Pawar and his group think that Deva is dead. Chakrapani is the head of this village with two sons, Anand and Ramakrishna.

Ramakrishna is a notorious guy in the village who bashes up the bad and respects his father’s principles. He is chased by a woman named Nandu. Anand, on the other hand, is a medico who is in love with his classmate Sirisha (Deva’s sister). Feared of their parents not accepting their marriage, both of them elope to their uncle Subba Rao’s residence in Mumbai. Ramakrishna, Priya, and Shiva reach Mumbai in search of this eloped couple only to get targeted by mafia again. Pawar wants to finish Shiva and Priya but are saved by Ramakrishna who later knows about Deva's flashback.

Ramakrishna now takes on the responsibility of his brother’s marriage with Sirisha and brings them back to Gandhipuram but to be continuously chased by this mafia. At last when both the families agree for the marriage of Ramakrishna with Priya and Anand with Sirisha, here comes back mafia Pawar to take the movie to the climax.

== Cast ==
- Ram Pothineni as Rama Krishna
- Arjun as Ashok Deva
- Priya Anand as Priya
- Bindu Madhavi as Nandu
- Vineet Kumar as Pawar
- Nassar as Chakrapani,(Rama Krishna's father)
- Prerna Khanna as Shirisha
- Pragathi as Rajyam (Rama Krishna's mother)
- Sayaji Shinde as DIG in Mumbai Police
- Brahmanandam as Subba Rao alias L.S.R
- Amit Tiwari as Pawar’s son
- Banerjee as Ravi (Deva's brother-in-law)
- Srinivasa Reddy as Jilani
- Brahmaji as Pawar's Brother
- Hema
- Pruthvi Raj as Satthi Babu
- Praveen as Boat Incharge
- Chatrapathi Sekhar as Shiva
- Bharath Raju as Kannababu
- Gracy Singh as Gauthami (cameo appearance)

== Soundtrack ==
Rama Rama Krishna Krishna

Soundtrack album by M. M. Keeravani
- Released: 18 April 2010
- Genre: Feature film soundtrack
- Language: Telugu
- Label: Aditya Music
- Producer: M. M. Keeravani

M. M. Keeravani chronology
| Lahore (2010) | Rama Rama Krishna Krishna (2010) | Vedam (2010) |

The soundtrack was composed by M. M. Keeravani, All lyrics were given by Anantha Sriram and released worldwide by Aditya Music. The album featured six tracks:

Track list
| No. | Title | Artist(s) | Length |
|---|---|---|---|
| 1. | "Rama Rama Krishna Krishna" | Karthik, Ranjith | 4:37 |
| 2. | "Ola Ulala" | Tippu, Chaitra | 4:24 |
| 3. | "Lera Chanti" | Karthik, chorus | 4:09 |
| 4. | "Count Down" | Chaitanya | 3:17 |
| 5. | "Endhukila" | M. M. Keeravani, Karthik, Geetha Madhuri | 5:02 |
| 6. | "Thu Go Jilla" | Daler Mehndi, Chaitra H. G. | 4:35 |

== Critical reception ==
A critic from The New Indian Express wrote "The camera work is okay and not comparable to strides made in the Telugu film industry these days. Editing could have been sharper. ‘Rama Rama Krishna Krishna’ is another average fare. See the film only if you have no alternative".

== Release ==
The film was released on 14 May 2010. It was dubbed later into Tamil as Gandhipuram and in Hindi as Nafrat Ki Jung by Goldmines Telefilms pvt ltd.
