= Winner (2017 film) =

- Movie Poster
- Directed by: Gopichand Malineni
- Screenplay by: Gopichand Malineni
- Story by: Veligonda Srinivas
- Produced by: Nallamalupu Srinivas (Bujji); Tagore Madhu
- Starring: Sai Dharam Tej; Rakul Preet Singh; Jagapati Babu
- Narrated by: Rana Daggubati
- Cinematography: Chota K. Naidu
- Edited by: Gowtham Raju
- Music by: S. Thaman
- Production companies: Sri Lakshmi Narasimha Productions; Leo Productions
- Release date: 24 February 2017
- Running time: 150 minutes
- Country: India
- Language: Telugu

Winner is a 2017 Indian Telugu-language action comedy film jointly produced by Nallamalupu Srinivas (Bujji) and Tagore Madhu on Sri Lakshmi Narasimha Productions and Leo Productions banner and directed by Gopichand Malineni. Starring Sai Dharam Tej, Rakul Preet Singh, Jagapati Babu and music composed by S. Thaman.

Production began in March 2016 and principal photography commenced in August 2016 in Hyderabad, other shooting locations included Kyiv, Lviv, Istanbul, Ooty and Bangalore. The film was released worldwide on 24 February 2017.

== Plot ==
Siddu manages to gain Sitara love by helping her to participate and win the National Championship. Siddhu also wins the race and reunites with his father (who has learnt the truth from Dharmendra Reddy's PA), and thrashes Aadhi. Dharmendra Reddy realizes his mistake and reunites with Siddu and Mahendra, thus becoming a Winner in challenge and life.

== Cast ==
- Sai Dharam Tej as Siddharth Reddy
- Rakul Preet Singh as Sitara
- Jagapati Babu as Mahendra Reddy
- Thakur Anoop Singh as Aadhi (Duplicate Siddharth Reddy)
- Mukesh Rishi as Dharmendra Reddy
- Aadarsh Balakrishna as Rich kid
- Priyadarshi Pullikonda
- Ali as Horseman Babu / Peter Hens
- Vennela Kishore as Padma
- Pruthviraj as Singham Sujatha
- Raghu Babu as Dharmendra Reddy's P.A.
- Suresh as Rajeev Reddy, Sitara's father
- Raghu Karumanchi
- Mukhtar Khan as K.R.
- Shekar
- Rakesh Varre
- Apoorva Srinivasan as Lakshmi
- Surya
- Sivanarayana
- Bithiri Sathi as himself
- Ranam Venu as Constable
- Duvvasi Mohan as Constable
- Kalyani as Lakshmi (Mahendra Reddy's first wife)
- Sonia Agarwal as Mahendra Reddy's wife
- Priya as Rajeev Reddy's wife and Sitara's mother
- Hari Teja as Hariteja
- Anasuya Bharadwaj as Anasuya (special appearance in a song)
- Mouryani as Lakshmi (Mahendra Reddy's daughter)
- Master Charith as Young Siddu

== Music ==
Winner

Soundtrack album by S. Thaman
- Released: 2017
- Recorded: 2017
- Genre: Soundtrack
- Length: 22:18
- Label: Aditya Music
- Producer: S. Thaman

S. Thaman chronology
Jaguar (2016)	Winner (2017)	Shivalinga (2017)

The background score and soundtrack album is composed by S. Thaman.

Track-List
No.	Title	Lyrics	Singer(s)	Length
1.	"Sitara"	Ananta Sriram	Yazin Nizar, Sanjana	4:39
2.	"Pichonne Ayipoya"	Sri Mani	Deepak, Christopher Stanley, Sai Charan	4:50
3.	"Suyaa Suyaa"	Ramajogayya Sastry	Anurag Kulkarni, Suma Kanakala	4:03
4.	"Naa B C Centerlu"	Bhaskarabhatla Ravi Kumar	Nakash Aziz, Sharmila, Anthara	4:16
5.	"Bhajarangabali"	Ramajogayya Sastry	M. L. R. Karthikeyan, Naveen Madhav, SriKrishna, Aditya Iyengar, Sarath Santhosh, Hymath, Arun	4:46
Total length:				22:18

== Reception ==
Jeevi of Idlebrain.com gave a rating of 3 out of 5. Srividya Palaparthi of The Times of India rated the film 2.5 out of 5 and called it "typical Tollywood commercial potboiler". Suhas Yellapantula of The New Indian Express rated it 1/5 and called out the "shoddy filmmaking and a purposeless, disjointed script".
