= Race Gurram =

2014 Indian film by Surender Reddy

- Theatrical release poster
- Directed by: Surender Reddy
- Written by: Story: Vakkantham Vamsi; Screenplay: Surender Reddy; Dialogues: Vema Reddy
- Produced by: Nallamalupu Srinivas (Bujji); Venkateswara Rao
- Starring: Allu Arjun; Shruti Haasan; Shaam; Ravi Kishan
- Cinematography: Manoj Paramahamsa
- Edited by: Gautham Raju
- Music by: S. Thaman
- Production company: Sri Lakshmi Narasimha Productions
- Release date: 11 April 2014
- Running time: 163 minutes
- Country: India
- Language: Telugu
- Budget: est. ₹52 crore
- Box office: est. ₹100-110 crore

Race Gurram (transl. Race Horse) is a 2014 Indian Telugu-language action comedy film co-written and directed by Surender Reddy and produced by Nallamalupu Srinivas (Bujji), under Sri Lakshmi Narasimha Productions. The film stars Allu Arjun and Shruti Haasan while Shaam and Ravi Kishan play supporting roles. S. Thaman composed the music. Cinematography and editing were done by Manoj Paramahamsa and Gautham Raju respectively.

Principal photography began on 13 May 2013 in Hyderabad with the entire shoot completed on 22 February 2014. The film released worldwide on 11 April 2014 to positive reviews. The film marked Allu Arjun's first film to gross over ₹100 crore. With a distributor's share of ₹59.4 crore, the film emerged as highest grossing Telugu film of that year. It went on to earn Filmfare Awards for Best Actor, Best Actress and Best Playback Singer – Male.

== Plot ==
Ram and Lakshman "Lucky" are brothers and polar opposites. While the former is an honorable ACP, the latter is an unemployed, happy-go-lucky guy who is constantly at odds with his brother. Madhali Siva Reddy is a mercenary turned politician. Ram is determined to prevent Siva Reddy's participation in the upcoming elections following the death of his friend ACP Sameer who was investigating Siva Reddy.

One day, Lucky meets Sweety (Spandana), daughter of an industrialist Bheem Prakash, in an elevator. He notices that she doesn't react to anything, maintaining the neutral expression on her face without reacting no matter what happens. When she refuses to look scared during a bank robbery, even after being threatened with a gun, Lucky asks her why she is like this. Spandana says that she feels all emotions 'inside'. Her father, Bheem Prakash, taught her to be in control of her emotions. Lucky, who has fallen for Spandana, calls it rubbish, and vows to bring a change in her.

After meeting Lucky on a regular basis, she learns to show her emotions and reciprocates his love. Ram learns of Lucky's relationship and informs Prakash that his daughter is roaming with a lazy and spoilt guy as retribution for a previous prank. Prakash instantly dislikes Lucky, and tells him that he cannot marry his daughter. Lucky and Ram have a serious fight, where Lucky is slapped by his mother for the first time. Shaken and enraged, he steals Ram's jeep, which had incriminating evidence against Siva Reddy. Lucky is then attacked by Siva Reddy's men, who mistake him to be Ram, and the Jeep goes up in flames along with the files. Lucky beats up the goons, who try to tell him that they were planning to murder Ram. Upon hearing this, Lucky is enraged. He kidnaps Siva Reddy and beats him into a coma, tying him upside down to a tree. Siva Reddy is hospitalized.

Lucky then visits Siva Reddy's father Peddi Reddy and confesses. He talks about how he used to hate his brother, but has now realized that he loves his brother very much, which was why he reacted the way he did. When Siva Reddy wakes up from his coma, Peddi Reddy motivates him to wait for his opportunity to take revenge on Lucky. Lucky decides to reunite Ram with Shwetha, the woman he used to love, so that Ram would become happy and not interfere with his love story. After a few hilarious twists, his plan works.

After recovering and being elected as an MLA, Siva Reddy uses his influence and starts to take revenge on Lucky and his family. He gets Ram suspended through a false sexual harassment claim, and has the government demolish the family's house, claiming that it was illegally built. Ram is then informed that it was Lucky that stole his Jeep. A furious Ram kicks Lucky out of the family after berating him for what his mistake has cost them.

Lucky is abducted by Siva Reddy, who brutally beats him and leaves him hanging from the same tree Lucky hung him earlier. Lucky escapes and plans to take revenge with the help of Home Minister Govardhan, who owes Lucky as Lucky was the reason he got the post. Lucky fools Govardhan by convincing him he is suffering from cancer and has only two days to live. Govardhan says he will grant any wish Lucky asks, and Lucky requests to be instated as a special officer and asks Govardhan to do a solitary 12-hour ritual for Lucky's survival. Govardhan agrees. Lucky is in charge of a team of police officers including Kill Bill Pandey, a frustrated police officer who takes the lead and helps Lucky destroy Siva Reddy's properties, not knowing Lucky is a fake police officer. Govardhan's prayer finishes and after the CM scolds him of his mistake, Govardhan seeks Ram's help.

Lucky fights and defeats Siva Reddy, calling himself a Race Gurram or Race Horse, but after he cuffs him, Ram appears and cuffs Lucky. Govardhan and the CM want to publicly hang Lucky for his illegal actions and for humiliating them, but Ram tells them that people wouldn't take well to killing the man who exposed Siva Reddy. He reveals that the public was planning to re-elect the same government in the next elections. Lucky uses this opportunity and blackmails the CM and Govardhan to continue this special-force team and give police officers like his brother full powers. They let Siva Reddy go, but he is shot to death by Rajeev, who earlier had to kill ACP Sameer. Lucky and Ram reunite with their family and friends.

== Cast ==
- Allu Arjun as Allu Lakshman Prasad "Lucky" , a carefree man who wants to settle in the United States and frequently argues with his brother Ram.
  - Vikram Sahadev as Young Lucky
- Shruti Hassan as Spandana "Sweety", an emotionless girl who becomes expressive when she meets and falls in love with Lucky.
- Shaam as ACP Allu Ram Prasad IPS, Lucky's elder brother and a sincere and honorable cop who always does things by the book and argues with his brother Lucky.
- Ravi Kishan as Heavy Industries Minister Maddali Siva Reddy
- Mukesh Rishi as Maddali Peddi Reddy, Siva Reddy's father
- Saloni Aswani as Shweta, Ram's love interest who broke up with him because of Lucky's mischief, and years later marries Ram after Lucky reconciles them.
- Prakash Raj as Bheem Prakash, Spandana's emotionless father.
- Bramhanandam as Inspector Kill Bill Pandey, a sincere and skilled but extremely frustrated special police officer
- Ali as Dr. Bali, MBBS, a fake doctor who helps Ram reunite with Shweta and helps Lucky con Govardhan.
- M. S. Narayana as a tea stall owner and the man Lucky considers his uncle.
- Posani Krishna Murali as Home Minister Govardhan
- Jaya Prakash Reddy as JP, the chief cop.
- Apoorva Korlipara as JP's wife
- Pragathi as Spandana's mother
- Tanikella Bharani as Lucky and Ram's father
- Pavitra Lokesh as Lucky and Ram's mother
- Kota Srinivasa Rao as Hanumayya, Civil Supplies Minister and Coalition Party Leader
- Sayaji Shinde as Chief Minister
- Srinivasa Reddy as Lucky's friend
- Thagubothu Ramesh as Lucky's friend
- Rajiv Kanakala as Rajeev
- Paruchuri Venkateswara Rao as Venkatachalam, Sameer's father, who wants justice for his son after his demise.
- Giri Babu as Rama Chandra Murthy, Lucky's friend
- Duvvasi Mohan as Konda, Ram's friend and police officer
- Raghu Babu as Thief
- Kaartic Krishna Kumar as corrupt politician
- Narsing Yadav as a party member
- Venu Yeldandi as drunkard
- Kadhal Dhandapani as Lucky's ex's father
- Sudigali Sudheer as Spandana's car driver
- Raghu Karumanchi as Banda, Peddi Reddy's henchman
- Ramjagan as a police inspector
- Chammak Chandra as a police officer
- Swapna as Nijam show anchor
- Sravan as Maddali Shiva Reddy's henchman
- Rocket Raghava as the lift maintenance operator
- Srinivas Vajpayee as a party member
- Kyra Dutt as a special appearance in “Bhoochade”

== Production ==
=== Development and filming ===
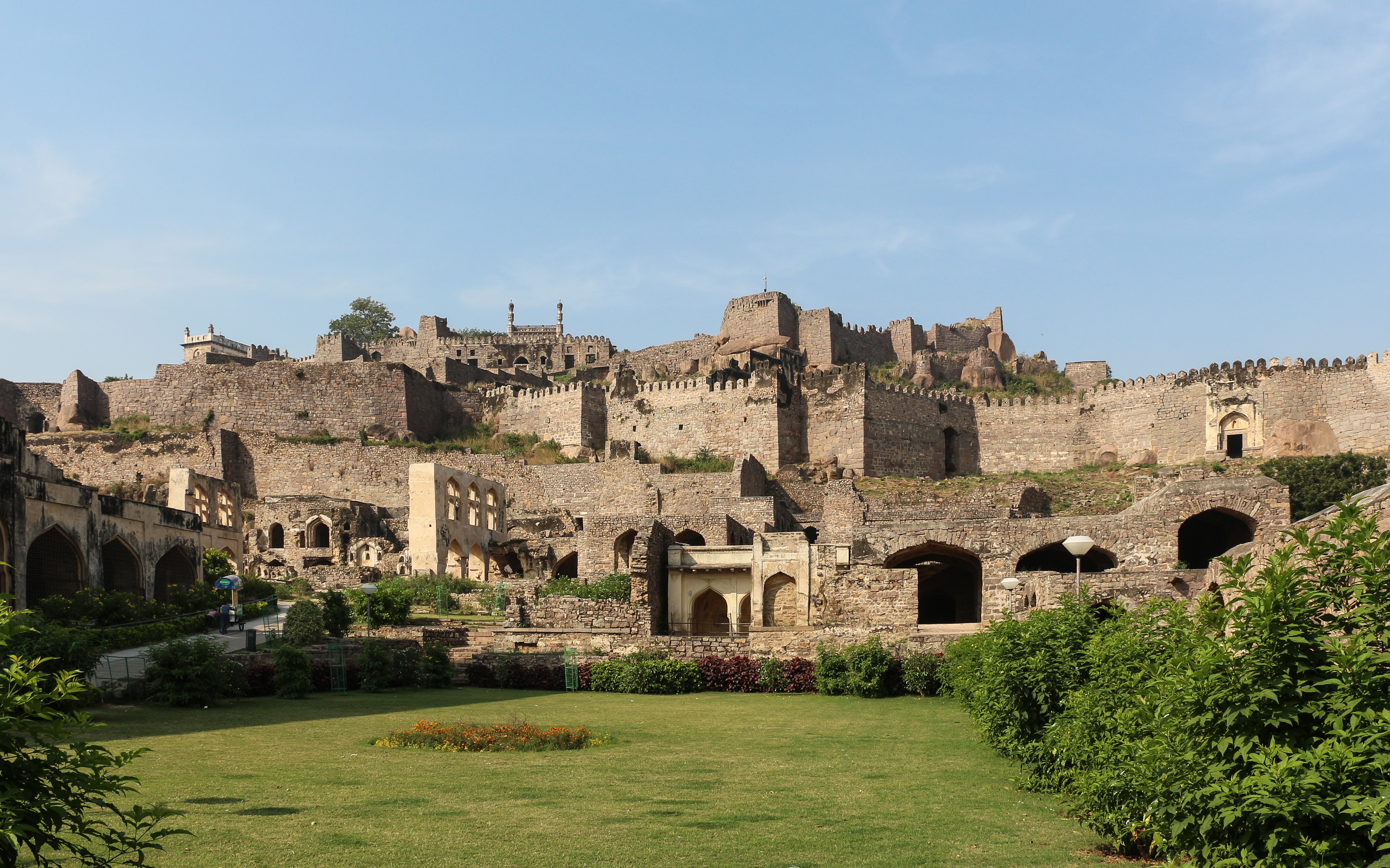
Golconda Fort where some scenes were shot on Allu Arjun and others.

It was reported in the early September 2012 that Surender Reddy would direct Allu Arjun in this film which was announced to be produced by Nallamalupu Bujji. It was titled Race Gurram in the end of October 2012. This was the first film for Allu Arjun with Surender Reddy and S. Thaman. The film was launched on 24 October 2012, the day of Vijayadasami, at Ramanaidu Studios in Hyderabad. Chiranjeevi, Allu Aravind, Nallamalupu Srinivas (Bujji), Dr. Venkateswara Rao, D. Ramanaidu, K. Raghavendra Rao, Nagababu, Ali, V. V. Vinayak, Rana Daggubati, Shyam Prasad Reddy, Vakkantham Vamsi graced the event. D. Ramanaidu did the formal pooja and Chiranjeevi gave the clap. V. V. Vinayak directed the first shot while Shyam Prasad Reddy switched on the Camera. One of the producers, Dr. Venkateshwar Rao said that the Regular shoot would start in December after the Completion of Allu Arjun's Iddarammayilatho. During the film's launch, it was reported that Vijayan would provide the fights and thrills in the film. Initially Samantha was approached for female lead in it, but later Shruti Haasan was selected as the Heroine, which was confirmed by the actress in her Twitter. It was declared that the regular shooting would start from 2 May 2013 aiming a Vijaya Dasami Release. However, due to some delay, the regular shooting started from 13 May 2013 in Hyderabad.

After completing the first schedule in Hyderabad, the team headed to Norway for canning some important scenes including some of the songs, making it a long schedule. At that point of time, it was reported that Surender Reddy roped in Shaam after he worked with him in Kick and Oosaravelli. Meanwhile, after the completion of the shoot at Norway, the unit proceeded to Europe(Switzerland, Italy) where 2 songs were scheduled to be canned in a period of 8 days ranging from 1 July 2013 after which the regular shoot would continue in Hyderabad. However, the shooting resumed in Geneva which later continued in Milan. At this point of time, Saloni was selected as the second heroine in the film which marks her first collaboration with Allu Arjun and Surender Reddy. Later on the unit returned to Hyderabad and Allu Arjun and Shruti Haasan participated in the shooting at Annapurna Studios 7 Acres. There the song "Cinema Choopista Maava" was shot under the choreography of Johnny Master. After the completion of the song shoot, Allu Arjun participated in a fight scene shoot which was choreographed by noted fight masters Ram-Lakshman. In early September 2013, it was confirmed that Bhojpuri star Ravi Kishan was roped in as the antagonist thus marking this film his Telugu debut.

Later in September, some scenes were canned on Allu Arjun and others at Golconda Fort in Hyderabad. Later on some fight scenes were canned in and around Hyderabad in which the leads participated. On the night of 28 October 2013 scenes between Allu Arjun and Shaam were shot at Hell pad Junction in Ramoji Film City at Hyderabad. In early November 2013, shooting continued in Ramoji Film City where some comedy scenes were shot. From 16 November 2013 some action sequences were canned in which Allu Arjun participated. The shooting continued in Ramoji Film City and the unit shot some more fight sequences at the outskirts of Hyderabad from 19 November 2013. The shooting continued in Jadcherla where scenes on Allu Arjun, Brahmanandam and Ravi Kishan were shot. Later some crucial scenes were shot near Charminar area in Hyderabad. After wrapping up a chase sequence on Allu Arjun and Shruti Haasan there, the unit yet again continued its shooting at Ramoji Film City. By then Surender Reddy revealed that most of the film's shoot had been wrapped up. On 24 December, it was announced that the film's talkie part was completed and 2 songs were left to be shot which would start form the new schedule which would commence from 5 January 2014.

On 5 January, the new schedule yet again began at Ramoji Film City, Hyderabad where some crucial scenes and an item number will be shot. It was said that the last song's shoot was said to be held from 20 to 25 January with which the filming would come to an end. Later on 13 January 2014 a song was shot on Allu Arjun and Kaira Dutta in which Thagubothu Ramesh and Srinivas Reddy also participated. It was said to be the introduction song of Allu Arjun in the film which was composed by Dinesh Master. A song was planned to be shot on Allu Arjun and Shruti Haasan from 15 February. However, since the latter had a surgery, the filming of the song was shifted to 17 February. In February 2014, it was reported that Veteran Kannada and Telugu actress Pavitra Lokesh is playing the role of Allu Arjun's Mother in this film. Meanwhile, on 20 February Shruti Haasan announced that she wrapped up her part of the shoot. The song's shoot came to an end on 22 February 2014 thus ending the film's shoot. In mid March 2014, it was reported that Brahmanandam would play the role of a police officer in this film. In an interview to the IANS, Brahmanandam told that he and Allu Arjun play the roles of partners in Police Department. He said "I play his assistant in the film and scenes between us are a laugh riot. I'm extremely happy with the character because it's something I haven't played in a long time. I'm sure audiences are going to love watching us together on screen". Sunil gave voice-over for the film.

=== Post production ===
The post production activities commenced during the final phase of shooting and by the end of March, it was reported that the film's post production activities are in full swing at Chennai B2h Studios. On 29 March, it was reported that Thaman completed the re-recording work for the first half of the film and the second half's re-recording work is in progress. At the same time, it was also reported that film's unit is striving hard to ensure that the film's first cut is ready by 31 March. It was said that as soon as the activities come to an end, the film's first copy would be screened for undergoing censor certification. On 4 April 2014 the film was certified a U/A certificate by Central Board of Film Certification with the film's length being 163 minutes. The final copy of the film was ready on 4 April 2014.

== Music ==
S. Thaman composed the music and background score for this film which marks his first collaboration with Allu Arjun and second collaboration with Surender Reddy. In January 2014, Lahari Music purchased the Audio rights for an amount of ₹75 lakh (US$78,000). Later in early March 2014, Thaman confirmed that the film's audio would be launched on 16 March at Hyderabad. The film's Soundtrack Album was released in a simple and formal promotional event on 16 March 2014 at Park Hyatt hotel in Hyderabad. The Audio received predominant positive response from all corners and many celebrities praised Thaman for his work. The soundtrack also debuted as one among the top ten albums in iTunes along with Maan Karate and Kochadaiiyaan.

== Marketing ==
The film's first look was released on 7 December 2013. The teaser trailer was released on the same day at 10:00 AM on the occasion of Surender Reddy's birthday in YouTube. The Teaser was of 30 seconds in which Arjun runs in a Black shirt and Black Trousers with Black Goggles with the Background Music notching the word Boochodu (Bogeyman) with Ravi Kishan's eyes highlighted twice. The teaser received positive response from fans of Arjun as well as common audience. The Audio release poster featuring Allu Arjun and Shruti Haasan was released on 13 March 2014 in High Quality version after the low quality version released into the Internet. That poster received viral response from all corners. On 16 March 2014 the teasers of all the six songs were released into YouTube officially by the makers.

The still featuring Allu Arjun and Shruti Haasan went viral. Before the music launch was held in a low key affair at Park Hyatt, it was reported that the makers opted for organizing a big fanfare event before the film's release. After the Audio released into the market, it was reported that the film's theatrical trailer would be launched in a function held at Rajahmundry on 22 March 2014. The venue was confirmed on 21 March 2014 as the GIET college youth fest in Rajamundry. The trailer received positive response from all corners. It was reported that the producers ordered unique light based standees featuring a dancing still of Allu Arjun and each of these standees costed around ₹10,000. It was said that the producer has ordered around 50 standees and keep it prominently in all multiplexes and important single screens.

== Release ==
Initially, the film was planned as a Vijayadashami release viz. 13 October 2013. In the end of November 2013, it was confirmed that the film would be using the Auro 11.1 Audio file format by Barco Sounds thus making it the third Telugu movie to adopt this next-generation three-layer sound technology from Auro Technologies, powered by Barco Sounds which was succeeded by Mahesh Babu's 1 – Nenokkadine. But in early December 2013, it was confirmed that the film's release postponed again thus exiting the Sankranti race. Then it was declared that it would hit the screens in February 2014. In the end of December 2013, Reports emerged that the film postponed yet again from February and was slated as a Summer Release.

In the end of January 2014, it was reported that the film would release worldwide on 4 April 2014. In mid February 2014, it was reported that the film is expected to release on 11 April 2014. But on the last day of February 2014, it was reported that the film would release on 28 March 2014 clashing with Nandamuri Balakrishna's Legend which was also slated for a 28 March 2014 release worldwide. On 13 March 2014 FICUS Inc released a press note which stated that they purchased the entire overseas theatrical screening rights of the film. During the theatrical trailer launch at Rajahmundry, Allu Arjun confirmed that the film would release on 11 April 2014. In association with FICUS Inc, European Telugu Colors purchased the theatrical screening rights of the film in Europe except in UK. The film was later dubbed and released in Hindi as Main Hoon Lucky: The Racer in 2015 which grossed more than 121 million views on YouTube.

== Reception ==
=== Critical reception ===
The Times of India gave the film a rating of 3.5 out of five stars and stated that "All in all it’s the ideal Tollywood masala package loaded with the right doses of entertainment, brotherly love, and Brahmanandam. You can’t ask for more can you?". Sify gave the film rating of 3.25 out of five stars and noted that "'Race Gurram' is a regular commercial entertainer with a dose of comedy in the second half. Allu Arjun and 'Kill Bill' Pandey steal the show". idlebrain.com gave a review stating "Plus points of the movie are Allu Arjun, Brahmanandam, Cinematography, second half screenplay, all round orientation and production values. On the flip side, eccentric villain characterization and uneven tempo of the film should have been taken care of. On a whole, Race Gurram with its allround commercial elements should do well at box office! And watch out for Brahmi as ‘kill bill pandey’!" and rated the film 3.25/5. According to all the reviews and critics Allu Arjun Police Introduction scene is the highlight scene from the entire movie.

The Hindu wrote "Race Gurram makes no pretensions to be a hatke film. It is an out and out Allu Arjun film and it makes no bones of that. Directed by Surender Reddy, Race Gurram is a family entertainer with its fair share of action and comedy and a generous dose of Allu Arjun’s dancing skills".

=== Box office ===
Race Gurram collected a share of ₹6.89 crore in Andhra Pradesh and Telangana in its first day. The film became the first Allu Arjun film to earn $1 million in USA. The film collected ₹54.31 crore nett in 4 weeks, becoming the biggest hit for Allu Arjun. The Malayalam dubbed version Lucky: The Racer was also received good reception at the box office. Race Gurram completed 50 days in 159 centres and 100 days in 26 centres. In its full theatrical run Race Gurram earned over ₹60 crore distributor share and emerged as the highest grossing Telugu film of 2014.

== Awards and nominations ==
Filmfare Awards

- Best Actor – Allu Arjun
- Best Actress – Shruti Haasan
- Best Playback Singer – Male – Simha – "Cinema Choopista Mava"

Nandi Awards

- Best Male Comedian – Brahmanandam
- Best Male Dubbing Artist – P. Ravi Shankar

CineMAA Awards

- Best Film – Nallamalupu Bujji
- Best Actor – Allu Arjun
- Best Editor – Goutham Raju

SIIMA

- Best Director (Telugu) – Surender Reddy
- Best Actress (Telugu) – Shruti Haasan
- Best Comedian (Telugu) – Brahmanandam
- Best Male Playback Singer (Telugu) – Simha – "Cinema Choopista Mava"
- Best Dance Choreographer – Johnny – "Cinema Choopista Mava"

B. Nagi Reddy Memorial Award

- Best Wholesome Entertainment Telugu Film Award – Nallamalupu Bujji & Dr. Venkateswara Rao

Santosham Film Awards

- Best Producer – Nallamalupu Srinivas & Dr. Venkateswara Rao
- Best Choreographer – Jani Master
