= Rakul Preet Singh =

Indian actress (born 1990)

- Singh in 2026
- Born: 10 October 1990 (age 36); New Delhi, India
- Education: Jesus and Mary College
- Occupation: Actress
- Years active: 2009–present
- Works: Full list
- Spouse: Jackky Bhagnani (m. 2024)

Rakul Preet Singh (born 10 October 1990) is an Indian actress who predominantly works in Telugu, Hindi and Tamil films. Singh is a recipient of several accolades including a SIIMA Award, in addition to four nominations at the Filmfare Awards South.

Singh started her career as a model and made her acting debut with the Kannada film Gilli (2009). Singh received Filmfare Award for Best Actress – Telugu nominations for her performance in Venkatadri Express (2013), Loukyam (2014), Nannaku Prematho (2016) and Rarandoi Veduka Chudham (2017). She then appeared in commercial successes: Pandaga Chesko (2015), Sarrainodu (2016), Dhruva (2016), Spyder (2017), Theeran Adhigaaram Ondru (2017) and Ayalaan (2024). Singh expanded to Hindi films with Yaariyan (2014). She has since appeared in De De Pyaar De (2019), Runway 34 (2022) and Doctor G (2022). She has also starred in the Hindi epic mythological film Ramayana: Part 1 (2026).

Alongside her acting career, Singh is a celebrity endorser for several brands. She is married to actor–producer Jackky Bhagnani which whom she has a daughter born in 2026.

== Early life ==
Singh was born on 10 October 1990 in a Punjabi Sikh family in New Delhi to Kulwinder Singh, an officer in Indian Army, and his wife Rajender Kaur. Her younger brother, Aman Preet Singh, is also an actor. Singh did her schooling from Army Public School, Dhaula Kuan, and later completed a degree in Mathematics from the Jesus and Mary College, Delhi.

== Career ==
=== Debut and early roles (2009–2014) ===
Singh, who said that she had always dreamt of being an actress, began her career in modelling at age 18 while she was still in college. In 2009 she made her acting debut in the Kannada film, Gilli, a remake of Selvaraghavan's 7G Rainbow Colony. She stated that she signed up the film "with the aim to earn a little extra pocket money" and that she was unaware "how big south Indian films were". She won critical acclaim for her role in the film before returning to complete her degree and compete in the 2011 Femina Miss India pageant. Apart from the People's Choice Miss Indiatimes, she won four subtitles at the pageant including Pantaloons Femina Miss Fresh Face, Femina Miss Talented, Femina Miss Beautiful Smile and Femina Miss Beautiful Eyes.

She returned to films in 2011, featuring opposite Siddharth Rajkumar in Keratam which was released both in Telugu and Tamil languages, though critics noted that "she got very little screen time". The film was also made in Tamil simultaneously titled as "Yuvan" with the same cast but different director. In 2012, she appeared in a supporting role in the Tamil film Thadaiyara Thaakka. In January 2013 she appeared in a Tamil film titled Puthagam. In November 2013 she was seen in Venkatadri Express in Telugu, the latter becoming a commercial success and earned her first Filmfare Award for Best Actress – Telugu nomination. In 2014, she debuted in a starring role in Hindi with Divya Kumar's directorial debut Yaariyan, after which her third Tamil film Yennamo Yedho released. By mid-2014, she was working on three Telugu films simultaneously, which were directed by Sriwass, G. Nageswara Reddy, and Gopichand Malineni. Sriwass's Loukyam and G. Nageswara Reddy's Current Theega were her next releases. She received positive reviews for her performances in both films. She received her second Filmfare Best Actress – Telugu nomination for Loukyam.

=== Breakthrough and success in Telugu films (2015–2018) ===
Singh further established her career in Telugu films in 2015. She was then selected as the female lead in three Telugu films that year: She first appeared in Pandaga Chesko starring opposite Ram Pothineni and directed by Gopichand Malineni. She played an environmentalist in the film. She then appeared in Surender Reddy's Kick 2 opposite Ravi Teja, and Srinu Vaitla's Bruce Lee opposite Ram Charan. Among these, only Pandaga Chesko was a box office success.

All of Singh's 2016 releases; Nannaku Prematho, where she played a businessman's arrogant daughter opposite Jr. Ntr, Dhruva, where she played a forensic expert opposite Ram Charan, and Sarrainodu, where she played a village girl grieving her father's death opposite Allu Arjun, emerged among the highest grossing Telugu film of the year. Her performance in Nannaku Prematho, earned her third Filmfare Best Actress – Telugu nomination and won her the SIIMA Award for Best Actress – Telugu.

Singh had five releases in 2017, which earned her further success and prominence in Telugu films. She first played a widow in Jaya Janaki Nayaka opposite Bellamkonda Sreenivas, the film received 1 billion views (as of 2026) and has become the most watched Indian movie on YouTube. Singh then played a timid college girl in Rarandoi Veduka Chudham opposite Naga Chaitanya, Reviewing the film, Hemanth Kumar CR from Firstpost noted, "Rakul plays an author-backed role and does a fine job, but somewhere you can’t help but wonder if she really needed so many lines, especially in the film’s first half." It emerged a commercial success and earned her fourth Filmfare Best Actress – Telugu nomination.

Her next release was Winner opposite Sai Dharam Tej, a commercial failure. Following this, Singh appeared in the bilingual Spyder opposite Mahesh Babu, The film emerged a major commercial success. Her last release that year saw her play a police officer's wife in the Tamil film Theeran Adhigaaram Ondru opposite Karthi. Sudhir Srinivasan of The New Indian Express was appreciative of her "sprightly presence". It became another box office success. Singh returned to Hindi films following a small hiatus with the 2018 film Aiyaary opposite Sidharth Malhotra, which failed at the box office.

=== Career expansion (2019–2022) ===
Singh promoting Runway 34 in 2022

Singh started 2019 as she first took on a guest role in Nandamuri Balakrishna's NTR: Kathanayakudu as Sridevi. She then went on to play the female lead in Dev opposite Karthi for the second time. Singh appeared with Ajay Devgn and Tabu in Luv Ranjan's Bollywood romcom, De De Pyaar De, released on 17 May 2019. The same month, she appeared in Selvaraghavan's NGK opposite Suriya. Her fifth release of 2019 was a Telugu romantic comedy film Manmadhudu 2, produced by Nagarjuna Akkineni and directed by Rahul Ravindran. In the same year, she appeared in Milap Milan Zaveri's action drama Marjaavaan, alongside Ritesh Deshmukh, Sidharth Malhotra and Tara Sutaria.

In 2021, Singh starred in the Chandra Sekhar Yeleti-directed film Check, alongside Nithiin and in Sardar Ka Grandson opposite Arjun Kapoor. Her Telugu film Konda Polam directed by Krish alongside Panja Vaisshnav Tej was released on 8 October. In her review about the film, Neeshita Nyayapati of The Times of India wrote about Singh that "Rakul is a delight as Obu and the dubbing for her character seems almost pitch-perfect, fitting right into the skin of the character. She's a ray of sunshine in an otherwise muted film".

Her first release in 2022 came with the action film Attack, co-starring John Abraham and Jacqueline Fernandez, a Lakshya Raj Anand's directorial debut. It received mixed reviews. This was followed by the release of Runway 34 in which she starred alongside Ajay Devgn and Amitabh Bachchan. Both the films where commercial failures. She also featured in Indra Kumar's slice-of-life comedy Thank God alongside Devgn and Sidharth Malhotra, which was a box office failure. Her next release was Anubhuti Kashyap's Doctor G in which she was paired opposite Ayushmann Khurrana. Doctor G received positive reviews from the critics and was average at the box office. Rakul also paired up with Akshay Kumar in Cuttputtli which was released on Disney+ Hotstar.

=== Critical success and further work (2023–present) ===
Singh's first release in 2023 was the social family entertainer film Chhatriwali directed by Tejas Prabha Vijay Deoskar. The film was released on Zee5. She received praise from the critics for her performance. The Hindu noted that Singh "shines" in her role. This was followed by Boo and I Love You, both released on JioCinema. Singh had two Tamil film releases in 2024 with S. Shankar's vigilante-action film Indian 2 opposite Siddharth, and science fiction film Ayalaan opposite Sivakarthikeyan. Both films emerged among the year's highest grossing Tamil films, though the former bombed at the box office.

In her first film release of 2025, Singh played a physiotherapist, dealing with her fiancé ex-wife in Mere Husband Ki Biwi, opposite Arjun Kapoor. Anuj Kumar of The Hindu found her performance to be similar to her free-spirited character in De De Pyaar De. She also reprised her role as Ayesha in the sequel film, De De Pyaar De 2 opposite Ajay Devgn. Nandini Ramnath noted, "The sequel belongs to Rakul, who is in sparkling form as the feisty, outspoken heroine." The film underperformed commercially.

Singh started 2026 with Pati Patni Aur Woh Do, playing a forest officer opposite Ayushmann Khurrana. Rishabh Suri felt Rakul gets room to experiment here, and "fits" into the film's quirky world. In her second release of the year, Singh played Shurpanakha in Nitesh Tiwari's Ramayana: Part 1 opposite Vivek Oberoi. Chirag Sehgal of News18 noted, "Rakul is a pleasant addition as Supranakha. Her scenes are engaging, and she brings the required energy to the character."

== Personal life ==
In 2021, Singh announced that she was in a relationship with actor-producer Jackky Bhagnani. On 21 February 2024, Singh married Bhagnani in a traditional Hindu wedding ceremony in Goa. Up until her wedding, Singh lived in Hyderabad, later shifted to Mumbai permanently where she owns a house as well.

== Other work and media image ==
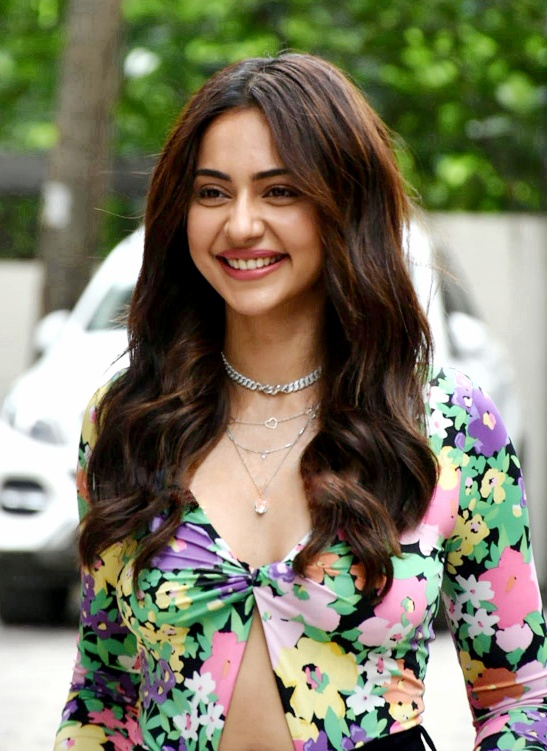
Singh in 2022

Singh is considered among the most popular actors of Telugu cinema. She stood at the 17th place on Forbes India's most influential stars on Instagram in South cinema for the year 2021. Filmfare's Tanisha Bhattacharya stated that Singh has an "impressive filmography", she said, "Rakul's stellar roles showcase how talented the actress is. She is proving her mettle of being a bankable actor." Pratiksha Acharya of Grazia noted, "Walking the line between South Indian cinema and Bollywood, Rakul has quickly made herself a force to reckon with." In 2024, Singh was placed 82nd on IMDb's List of 100 Most Viewed Indian Stars.

Singh has frequently featured in Times' 50 Most Desirable Woman list. She ranked 34th in 2018, 24th in 2019, and 14th in 2020. In Hyderabad Times' 30 Most Desirable Woman list, she was placed 9th in 2018, 7th in 2019 and 4th in 2020. She ranked 11th in 2018 and 12th in 2019 in Chennai Times' 30 Most Desirable Woman. Singh is a prominent celebrity endorser for brands and products including Eva, Liberty Shoes and AccessHer. In 2017, Singh was appointed as the brand ambassador for Beti Bachao, Beti Padhao programme by the Government of Telangana. She became the mentor of the South Zone during the Femina Miss India 2018 contest. Singh has often walked the ramp for Lakshmi Manchu's Charity Fashion show, for the NGO "Teach for Change". During COVID-19 crisis, she provided food to 200–250 families in a slum in Gurugram and also did a crowdfunding to raise funds for Covid relief.

Singh has an active franchise of three functional training gyms of F45 Training. Two of them are in Hyderabad, located in the suburbs of Gachibowli and Kokapet, while the other is in Visakhapatnam. In 2021, Singh co-founded and launched an app called "Starring You", with her brother Aman. It helps aspirants overcome the hurdle of physical distances and boundaries. In 2023, Singh performed in Doha for the "Entertainer No. 1" tour, alongside Shahid Kapoor, Varun Dhawan, Tiger Shroff, Kiara Advani, Jacqueline Fernandez, and Ash King. In 2024, Singh partnered with Curefoods to launch Arambam, a millet-based dine-in restaurant in Hyderabad.

== Filmography ==
Key
†	Denotes films that have not yet been released

List of Rakul Preet Singh film credits
Year	Title	Role	Language	Notes	Ref.
2009	Gilli	Anitha	Kannada		
2011	Keratam	Sangeetha	Telugu	Bilingual film	
2011	Yuvan	Meera	Tamil	Bilingual film	
2012	Thadaiyara Thaakka	Gayathri Ramakrishnan	Tamil		
2013	Puthagam	Divya	Tamil		
2013	Venkatadri Express	Prarthana	Telugu		
2014	Yaariyan	Saloni	Hindi		
2014	Yennamo Yedho	Nithya	Tamil		
2014	Rough	Nandu	Telugu		
2014	Loukyam	Chandrakala "Chandu"	Telugu		
2014	Current Theega	Kavitha	Telugu		
2015	Pandaga Chesko	Divya	Telugu		
2015	Kick 2	Chaitra	Telugu		
2015	Bruce Lee	Rishomi "Riya"	Telugu		
2016	Nannaku Prematho	Divyanka "Divya" Krishnamurthy	Telugu		
2016	Sarrainodu	Mahalakshmi / Jaanu	Telugu		
2016	Dhruva	Ishika	Telugu		
2017	Winner	Sitara	Telugu		
2017	Rarandoi Veduka Chudham	Bhramarambha	Telugu		
2017	Jaya Janaki Nayaka	Janaki / Sweety	Telugu		
2017	Spyder	Charlie	Telugu	Bilingual film	
2017	Spyder	Shalini	Tamil	Bilingual film	
2017	Theeran Adhigaaram Ondru	Priya Theeran	Tamil		
2018	Aiyaary	Sonia Gupta	Hindi		
2019	NTR Kathanayakudu	Sridevi	Telugu	Special appearance	
2019	Dev	Meghna Padmavati	Tamil		
2019	De De Pyaar De	Ayesha Khurana	Hindi		
2019	NGK	Vanathi Thyagarajan	Tamil		
2019	Manmadhudu 2	Avanthika	Telugu		
2019	Marjaavaan	Aarzoo Siddiqui	Hindi		
2020	Shimla Mirchi	Naina Sharma	Hindi	Delayed release; Filmed in 2014	
2021	Check	Advocate Manasa	Telugu		
2021	Sardar Ka Grandson	Radha Kaur Khasan	Hindi		
2021	Konda Polam	Obulamma	Telugu		
2022	Attack	Dr. Sabaha Qureshi	Hindi		
2022	Runway 34	Tanya Albuquerque	Hindi		
2022	Cuttputlli	Divya Malhotra	Hindi		
2022	Doctor G	Dr. Fatima Duggal	Hindi		
2022	Thank God	Sub Inspector Ruhi Kapoor	Hindi		
2023	Chhatriwali	Sanya Dhingra	Hindi		
2023	Boo	Kaira	Tamil	Bilingual film	
2023	Boo	Kaira	Telugu	Bilingual film	
2023	I Love You	Satya Prabhakar	Hindi		
2024	Ayalaan	Thara	Tamil		
2024	Indian 2	Disha	Tamil		
2025	Mere Husband Ki Biwi	Antara Khanna	Hindi		
2025	De De Pyaar De 2	Ayesha Khurana	Hindi		
2026	Pati Patni Aur Woh Do	Nilofer Khan	Hindi		
2026	Ramayana: Part 1	Shurpanakha	Hindi		
2028	Ramayana: Part 2 †	Shurpanakha	Hindi		
TBA	Indian 3 †	Disha	Tamil	Post-production	

== Awards and nominations ==
Year	Award	Category	Film	Result	Ref.
2014	Filmfare Awards South	Best Actress – Telugu	Venkatadri Express	Nominated	
2014	CineMAA Awards	Best Actress – Critics	Loukyam	Won	
2015	South Indian International Movie Awards	Best Actress (Telugu)	Loukyam	Nominated	
2015	Filmfare Awards South	Best Actress – Telugu	Loukyam	Nominated	
2015	Producers Guild Film Awards	Best Female Debut	Yaariyan	Nominated	
2017	Filmfare Awards South	Best Actress – Telugu	Nannaku Prematho	Nominated	
2017	South Indian International Movie Awards	Best Actress (Telugu)	Nannaku Prematho	Won	
2018	Filmfare Awards South	Best Actress – Telugu	Rarandoi Veduka Chudham	Nominated	
2018	South Indian International Movie Awards	Best Actress (Telugu)	Jaya Janaki Nayaka	Nominated	
2018	Zee Telugu Apsara Awards	Sensational Star of the Year	—N/a	Nominated	
2020	Zee Cine Awards	Best Actor – Female	De De Pyaar De	Nominated	
2023	Bollywood Hungama Style Icons	Most Stylish Glam Star	—N/a	Nominated	
2023	Pinkvilla Style Icons Awards	Super Stylish Youth Idol	—N/a	Won	
2024	Iconic Gold Awards	Best Actress of the Year - OTT	Chhatriwali	Won	

== See also ==
- List of dancers
