= Mister (2017 film) =

2017 film by Srinu Vaitla

- Directed by: Srinu Vaitla
- Written by: Gopimohan; Sreedhar Seepana
- Produced by: Nallamalupu Srinivas (Bujji); Tagore Madhu
- Starring: Varun Tej; Lavanya Tripathi; Hebah Patel
- Cinematography: K. V. Guhan
- Edited by: M. R. Varma
- Music by: Mickey J. Meyer
- Production companies: Sri Lakshmi Narasimha Productions; Light House Movie Makers
- Release date: 14 April 2017
- Running time: 157 minutes
- Country: India
- Language: Telugu

Mister is a 2017 Indian Telugu-language action comedy film directed by Srinu Vaitla. It was jointly produced by Nallamalupu Srinivas (Bujji) and Tagore Madhu, under Sri Lakshmi Narasimha Productions and Light House Movie Makers, respectively. It features Varun Tej, Lavanya Tripathi and Hebah Patel in the lead roles. The film is about a triangular love story in which Chey falls for Meera but finds out she loves another man. He follows her to India where he meets Chandramukhi, a village girl, who falls in love with him.

It had opened mixed to negative reviews from critics. Production began in February 2016. Principal photography commenced in May 2016 in Hyderabad.

== Plot ==
The movie begins with Rahul Vadayar (Nikitin Dheer) finding a new hideout for his forest smuggling business. He is helped by Gundappa Naidu (Tanikella Bharani). Gundappa aspires to take power from Pichayya Naidu (Nassar) who resides at a village amid the Andhra-Karnataka border. Pichayya Naidu requested his son K. J. Rao (Anand) to send his grandson to India and Chai (Varun Tej) rejecting their parent's proposal of him going to India and that he hates his grandfather because his mother died in an accident because of him.

Later he is sent to the airport to receive his cousin Priya whom he has not met before. Amidst confusion at the airport, Chai instead receives Meera (Hebah Patel) and falls for her at the first sight, and brings her to his home. Later, when he reaches home, he realizes it is Meera, not Priya. Meera reveals that she has to be received at the airport from someone who works as a museum coordinator (Melkote) in Spain and that she could not contact them as she has lost her phone and that she will be here for five days. The duo starts visiting all museums, and when Chai finds the Museum coordinator Srinu (Srinivas Reddy), he manages to convince Meera to stay at Chai's home.

When Chai's mother realizes his love towards Meera, she encourages him to express his love. Meera and Chai meet at Meera's best friend Andy's headstone, where she reveals that she is in love with Siddharth (Prince Cecil), who is very much like Chai, that does everything for the family. Chai treasures Meera as his first love, and not revealing that he is in love with Meera, sends her off at the airport to India. Some days later, Chai receives a call from Meera, revealing that Siddharth has cheated on her. Chai then decides to leave for India when his parents suggest he visit his grandfather, and they secretly hope for Meera to come back to him.

The setting changes to India, where Chai visits Siddharth and gets to know that Meera's brother Muthappa Gouda (Harish Uthaman) threatened Siddharth and his family to marry him off to another girl and that Gouda's men are at his house and though he loves Meera very much, he is helpless. Chai successfully escapes Siddharth and his family and promises to bring Meera along. Later, he visits Meera's place and explains Siddharth's predicament, and escapes with her.

On their way to meet Siddharth, the duo encounters film director Lakshmi Tulasi (Prudhvi) and his comical associates. After some comical circumstances with Lakshmi Tulasi, Chey meets Chandramukhi (Lavanya Tripathi), who is the daughter of Sri Veera Narasimha Rayalu (Murali Sharma) who belongs to king Sri Krishna Devaraya's dynasty, who runs a private government. She escapes from her marriage arranged with Rahul Vadayar, who also belongs to another royal family later it reveals that he is the son of Hajarappa (Nagineedu) who is a trusted aid of Rayalu and the dewan of their palace, who is very vicious and vengeful against Rayalu because he killed his first son on Rayulu's punishment for molesting a girl. Later Chandramukhi knows about Rahul's character, and she escapes from the palace. Later she went to Bangalore to her aunt's home for protection from the marriage, but her plan is in vain when they settled abroad. So, there is no way left she was returning to her home. Then goons started attacking her suddenly when Chai saves her, and she eventually falls in love with him. It is later revealed in a flashback that Chandramukhi has been house arrested since she was a young girl by her father and that he deeply bases all his actions based on the words of Swamiji, who in turn is controlled by Hajarappa.

Later some comical circumstances with Lakshmi Tulasi and Satyagrahi (Shakalaka Shankar), the gang meets Siddharth as promised, then Siddharth promises to Meera that he will come back for her to show a safe place to his family to protection from Gouda's men. After Siddharth left, they were attacked by Rayalu's men and are brought to the palace. Chai, Meera, and the gang are treated very well at the palace, and the two get elated. During their days at the palace, Meera slowly falls for Chai. Later, Chandramukhi asks Chai to escape as they will be sacrificed very soon as a punishment for the escape of Chandramukhi and bashing his henchmen. During the day of sacrifice, Chandramukhi's brother Bhukkaraya (Bharath) notices a Rudraksha-shaped mole on Chai's lower back and reveals that Chandramukhi's life is destined with Chai, and they both are set to marry as Swamiji has mentioned.

This makes Hajarappa angry, and he sends men to kill Chai. The three, along with Bhukkaraya, escape to Chai's grandfather's home. Later it is revealed by Pichayya Naidu's brother (Chandra Mohan) that the accident is happened by Chai's father. Then, Pichayya Naidu takes the blame on him in front of Chai because Chai doesn't want to hate his father. Finally, Chai unites with his grandpa. However, it is later revealed that Chai does not have a mole, and this plan has been hatched by Bhukkaraya and his mom (Satya Krishnan), to save Chai and marry off Chandramukhi to Chai. On hearing this, Meera expresses her love for Chai, fearing that she might lose him to Chandramukhi. Later Meera tells her story to Chandramukhi. After hearing her story, Chandramukhi with a broken heart accepts her love and decides to leave Chai. However, Chai convinces Meera that Siddharth loves her as much as him, and he confesses that he loves Chandramukhi. He reveals that a fight arises between Hajarappa and Pichayya Naidu, in the process, Chandramukhi kills Hajarappa by the way all the facts were known to Rayalu. Meanwhile, on the challenge day (Rahul Vadayar challenges Pichayya Naidu in a dual for the support of Gundappa Naidu to take over power from him), Chai enters on behalf of Pichayya Naidu reveals that his full name is also Pichayya Naidu. In the dual with Rahul, Chai bashes him to death.

Finally, Meera marries Siddharth with the consent of Muthappa Gouda, and Chai marries Chandramukhi, with their all families united.

== Cast ==
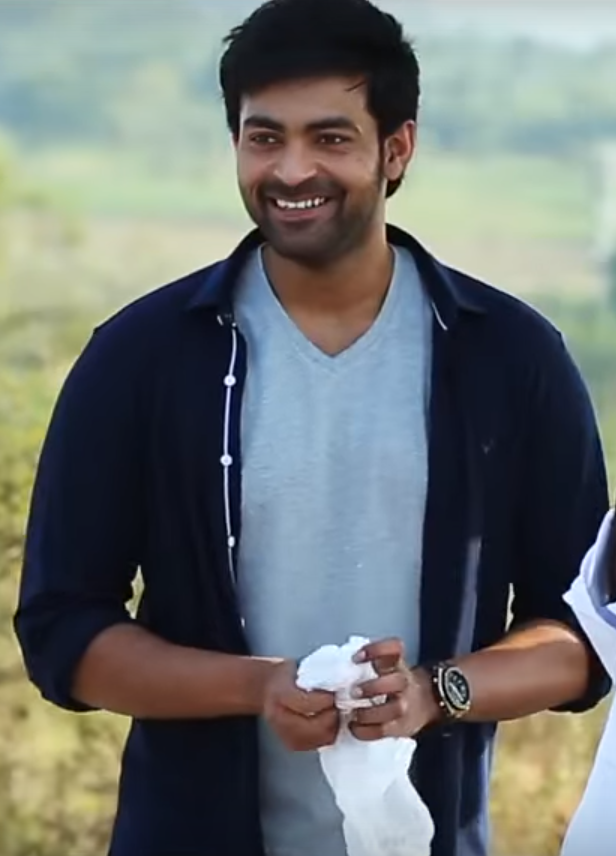
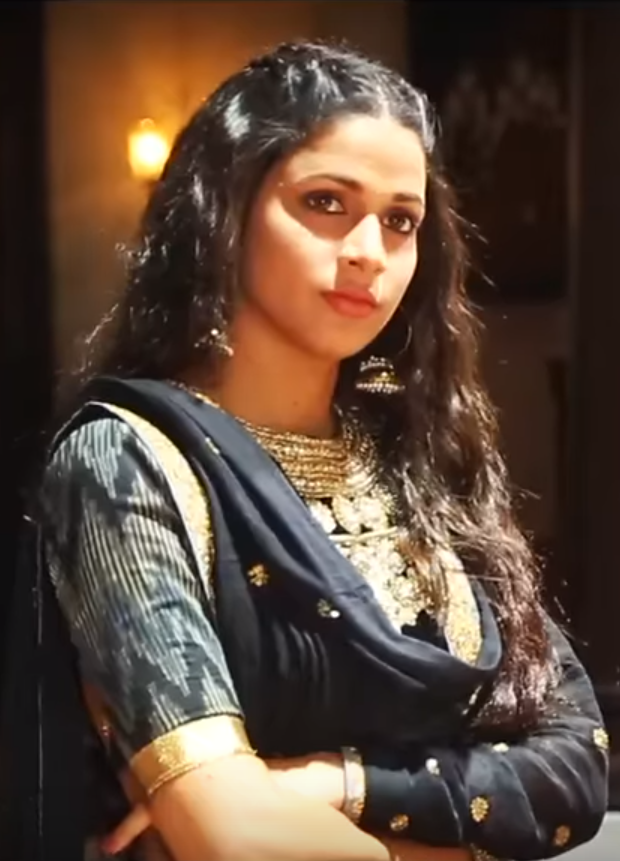
Varun Tej and actress Lavanya Tripathi, on the sets of the film.
- Varun Tej as Pichchayya Naidu Jr. 'Chai',
- Lavanya Tripathi as Chandramukhi
- Hebah Patel as Meera
- Prince Cecil as Siddharth
- Nikitin Dheer as Rahul Wadayar
- Ajaz Khan as Muthappa's brother
- Harish Uthaman as Muthappa Gouda, Meera's Brother
- Ravi Prakash as Ravi Prakash
- Satyam Rajesh as Rajesh
- Murali Sharma as Sri Veera Narasimha Rayalu, "Radhavara", Chandramukhi's father
- Nassar as Pichchaiah Naidu Sr., Chai's grandfather
- Chandra Mohan as Pichaiah Naidu's brother
- Anand as K. J. Rao, Chai's father
- Easwari Rao as Chai's stepmother
- Prudhviraj as Film Director Lakshmi Thulasi
- Tanikella Bharani as Gundappa Naidu
- Tejaswi Madivada as Keerthy, Vodka Prasad's P.A.
- Raghu Babu as Vodka Prasad
- Srinivasa Reddy as Seenu
- Nagineedu as Hajarappa
- Shafi as Sadasiva Rayalu
- Bharath as Bukkarayalu, Chandramukhi's brother and Sadasiva Rayalu's son
- Satya Krishnan as Bukkarayalu's mother
- Banerjee as Siddharth's father
- Surekha Vani as Muthappa's wife
- Fish Venkat as Muthappa's henchman
- Brahmaji as Special Police Officer
- Priyadarshi Pullikonda as Doctor
- Satya as Doctor
- Shakalaka Shankar as Satyagrahi
- Shaking Seshu as Lakshmi Thulasi's Assistant
- Abhay Bethiganti as Pranith, Lakshmi Thulasi's rebellious assistant.
- Shatru as Shatru, Muthappa's henchman
- Bharath Raju as Muthappa's henchman
- Madhussneha Upadhyay in a Special Appearance Dance Number in the item song "Neemeedha Manasaayara"

== Soundtrack ==
The music was composed by Mickey J. Meyer and released by Aditya Music & Saregama.

Mister

Soundtrack album by Mickey J. Meyer
- Released: 20 March 2017
- Recorded: 2017
- Genre: Soundtrack
- Length: 17:12
- Label: Aditya Music
- Producer: Mickey J. Meyer

Mickey J. Meyer chronology
Shatamanam Bhavati (2017)	Mister (2017)	Mahanati (2018)

Track-List

No. Title Lyrics Singer(s) Length

1. "Edho Edho Bagunde" Ramajogayya SastryRahul Nambiar 3:28

2. "Kanulake Teliyani" Krishna Kanth Ramya Behara 2:59

3. "Kadile Lokam Mottham" Krishna Kanth Mickey J. Meyer 3:32

4. "Sayyori Sayyori" Krishna Kanth Anurag Kulkarni, Ramya Behara 3:04

5. "Jhoomore Jhoomore" Krishna Kanth Nakash Aziz, Mohana Bhogaraju, Aditya Iyengar, Anurag Kulkarni

Total length: 17:12

== Release ==
Mister was released on 14 April 2017 on Ambedkar Jayanti.

== Reception ==
=== Box office ===
Mister earned a total gross of ₹4 crore at the AP and Nizam box office and an additional ₹1.25 crore from overseas and ROI for a total gross of ₹5.25 crore on its opening day.
