= Pandaga Chesko =

2015 Indian Telugu-language masala film

- release poster
- Directed by: Gopichand Malineni
- Screenplay by: Kona Venkat; Anil Ravipudi
- Story by: Veligonda Srinivas
- Produced by: Ravi Kireeti
- Starring: Ram; Rakul Preet Singh; Sonal Chauhan
- Cinematography: Sameer Reddy
- Edited by: Gautham Raju
- Music by: S. Thaman
- Production company: United Movies
- Release date: 29 May 2015
- Running time: 162 minutes
- Country: India
- Language: Telugu
- Budget: ₹15 crore
- Box office: ₹28.2 crore

Pandaga Chesko (transl. Celebrate) is a 2015 Indian Telugu-language action comedy film directed by Gopichand Malineni and produced by Paruchuri Kireeti on the United Movies banner. The film stars Ram, Rakul Preet Singh and Sonal Chauhan and Sampath Raj, Abhimanyu Singh, Sai Kumar, Adithya, Brahmanandam, Rao Ramesh, Pavitra Lokesh, Tejaswi Madivada, Vennela Kishore and Raghu Babu in other important roles. The story was penned by Veligonda Srinivas and the screenplay was provided by Kona Venkat and Anil Ravipudi, with the former writing the dialogues. S. Thaman composed the music, while Sameer Reddy and Gautham Raju handled the cinematography and editing of the film, respectively.

The film is about a millionaire from Portugal who visits his family in India to resolve an old family issue. The film was officially launched on 17 May 2014 at Film Nagar in Hyderabad. The principal photography of the film started on 16 June 2014 at Hyderabad. The film was a commercial hit at the box office.

== Plot ==
Karthik Pothineni (Ram Pothineni), a businessman runs a conglomerate in portugal, living with his mother Saraswati (Pavitra Lokesh), father (Rao Ramesh), brother-in-law and sister. He also employed his father, brother-in-law, and sister, keeping them on their toes to leave no stone unturned to take his company to greater heights. He meets another millionaire named Anushka (Sonal Chauhan), for a business proposal, where she decides to propose Karthik for marriage as a calculated move for their business. She also has to tie the knot with an Indian, in order to inherit her father's wealth. They get engaged, but Karthik's family is disappointed by the proposal. One of Karthik's companies gets into legal trouble due to a case registered by "The Green Army", headed by Divya (Rakul Preet Singh), against his factory, where Karthik heads to India to sort out the issue.

Karthik tries hard to convince Divya to withdraw her case, but in vain. Despite being engaged to Anushka, Karthik goes to a great extent of trying to impress Divya. However, Karthik later reveals his actual purpose behind coming to India, as he is the son of Bhupathi's sister Saraswati, who has been staying away from her family for the past 25 years. Divya's father and his three brothers abandoned their respective wives and sent them back to their house to live with their own brother Sai Reddy (Sai Kumar), because he refused to marry Saraswathi. However, this was actually a sacrifice made by Sai Reddy because Saraswathi confessed that she was in love with someone else (Karthik's father).

After seeing Karthik's attempt to save Divya from Bhupathi (Sampath Raj) and Sai Reddy's rival gang Shiva Reddy (Adithya), Bhupati meets Karthik for a marriage proposal with Divya. Karthik leaves for her village and secretly discloses his identity to Divya and Sai Reddy after he fools Bhupathi and his brothers by reuniting with their wives. Surprisingly, Anushka too arrives and assumes that her marriage is scheduled in Divya's home. She irritates Divya and her family. Karthik makes "Weekend" Venkat Rao (Brahmanandam) think that Anushka will marry him if he marries Divya. Before the marriage day, a gangster named Shankar (Abhimanyu Singh) who was in love with Divya, sends men to kidnap her.

Karthik takes up the chance and fools them to believe that Anushka is the bride. They kidnap Anushka and Venkat Rao. In anger that the time for the property is up, she forces Shankar to tie the mangalsutra and Venkat Rao escapes. Meanwhile, Shiva Reddy kidnap Divya in the temple. Karthik arrives and beats them up and convinces everybody to reunite with his mother and her family and marries Divya, bringing festival for the family. On their first night, Karthik and Divya are called by Anushka who is in a money-minded manner says she married Shankar for the property, but was actually fooled by Karthik and Divya.

== Cast ==
- Ram Pothineni as Kartheek Pothineni, Divya's love interest and Rao and Saraswati's son
- Rakul Preet Singh as Divya, Karthik's love interest and Bhupathi's daughter
- Sonal Chauhan as Anushka (Sweety)
- Sampath Raj as Bhupathi, Divya's father
- Abhimanyu Singh as Shankar
- Sai Kumar as Sai Reddy, Divya's uncle
- Adithya as Shiva Reddy, Bhupathi's rival
- Brahmanandam as Weekend Venkat Rao
- Rao Ramesh as Mr. Rao Pothineni, Kartheek Pothineni's father
- Pavitra Lokesh as Saraswati Pothineni, Kartheek Pothineni's mother
- Tejaswi Madivada as Swathi
- Raghu Babu as Raghupathi
- Vennela Kishore as Manager Konda
- M. S. Narayana as Swathi's father
- Harish Uthaman as Shiva Reddy's brother
- Brahmaji as Gajapathi (Bhupathi's brother)
- Satyam Rajesh as Kartheek Pothineni's brother-in-law
- Mamilla Shailaja Priya as Divya's mother
- Jaya Prakash Reddy as Shankar's uncle
- Sravan as Umapathi (Bhupathi's brother)
- Nandu
- Vishnu Priya
- Raja Ravindra as Shiva Reddy's Brother
- Rajitha
- Shakalaka Shankar as Kidnapper
- Prudhviraj as Kidnapper
- Prabhas Sreenu as Shankar's Henchmen
- Raghu Karumanchi as Sai Reddy's Henchmen

== Production ==
=== Development ===
In June 2013, reports emerged that Allu Arjun and Gopichand Malineni would be working together for a film which would be produced by Bandla Ganesh on the Parameswara Art Productions banner. However, in August 2013, it was reported that Dil Raju would produce the film on the Sri Venkateswara Creations banner. In September 2013, Kona Venkat confirmed that he would be penning the story and dialogue of the film. In a turn of events, Ram replaced Allu Arjun while Paruchuri Kireeti issued a press release that he would be producing the film on the United Movies banner. The film was titled as Pandaga Chesko in mid-February 2014. In early May 2014, the makers said that the film would be launched on 17 May 2014 and on the said date, the film was launched at Film Nagar in Hyderabad. S. Thaman composed the music while Arthur A. Wilson and Gautham Raju handled the cinematography and editing of the film respectively. The first look posters were unveiled on 14 January 2015 on the eve of Bhogi.

=== Casting ===
It was said in mid-February 2014 that Ram would sport a new look in this film. After Ram was selected as the protagonist of the film, Hansika was selected as the heroine of the film in early March 2014. Jagapathi Babu was recruited as the antagonist of the film in early April 2014. In early May 2014, Hansika was replaced by Rakul Preet Singh because the former had a lack of dates to accommodate due to multiple projects in hand by then. At the same time, reports emerged that Catherine Tresa would be selected as the second heroine in the film. Later she clarified that the makers did approach her for the role of second heroine but she rejected the offer since she was concentrating on main leads only. In mid-May 2014, the first look of Ram in this film was released which featured him stylish costumes. Hyderabad based Telugu actress Priya was selected to play an important character role in the film. In mid-June 2014, it was revealed that Ram would play the role of an NRI who visits his ancestral village to spend some time with his family and Rakul Preet Singh would play his love interest. In the second week of July 2014, Sonal Chauhan was selected as the second heroine in this film. A few more stills of Ram were released on 29 July 2014 which received a positive response. Tejaswi Madivada was confirmed as a part of the film's cast in mid-November 2014. Later, Sonal Chauhan confirmed that she too would be seen as a NRI. She said that her characterization is very intense similar to the role Sridevi played in Laadla. Abhimanyu Singh was signed for a parallel lead role alongside Ram and was paired with Sonal Chauhan. Rakul Preet said in an interview that she would be seen as an environmentalist in the film who takes herself too seriously.

=== Filming ===
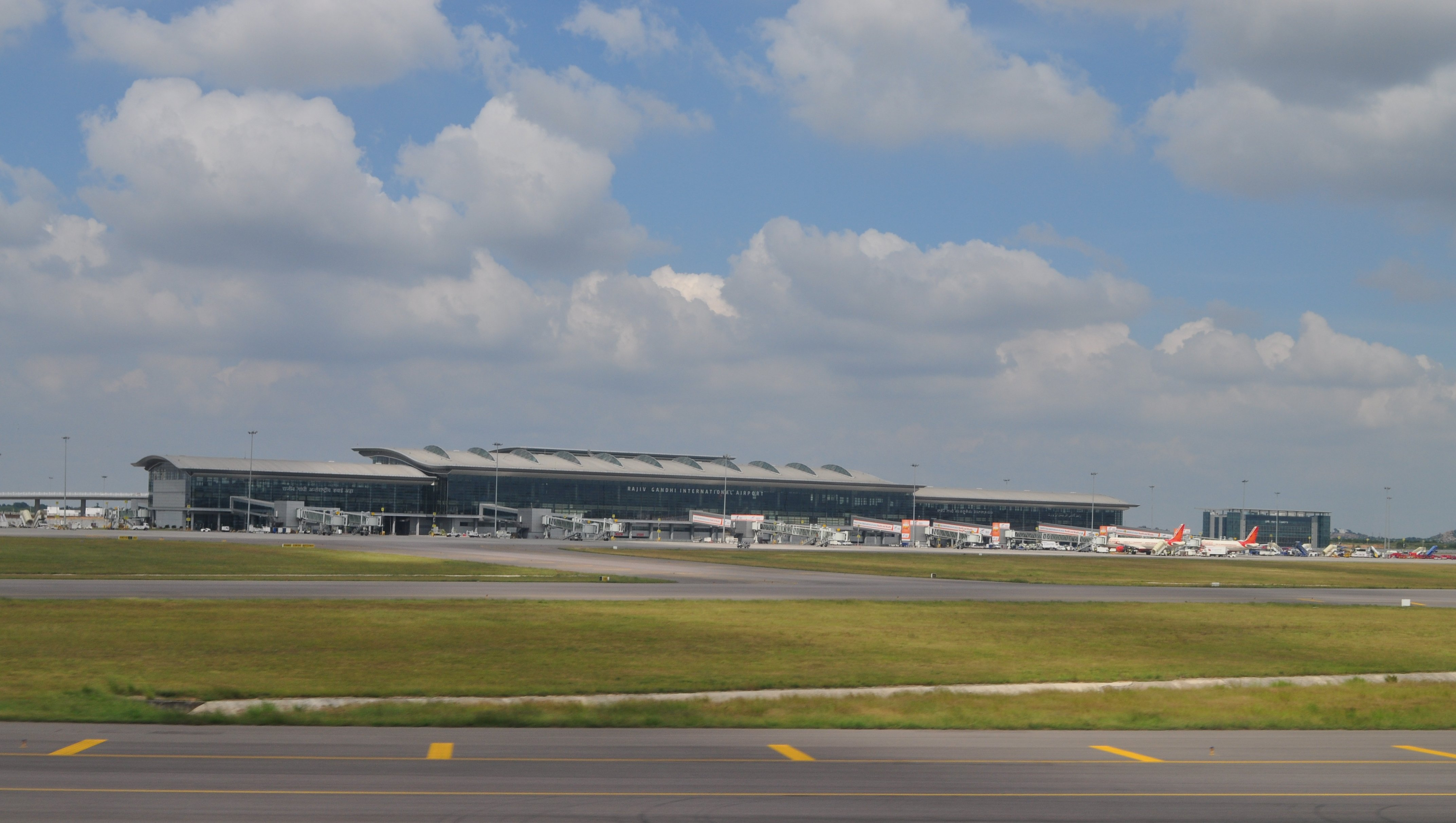
Rajiv Gandhi International Airport, where few key scenes were shot.

In early June 2014, the makers confirmed that the principal photography of the film would start on 12 June 2014. However, it started on 16 June 2014 at Hyderabad due to a delay in music sittings. After completion of the first schedule, the second schedule started on 14 July 2014 at Hyderabad where some key scenes were shot on Ram and Rakul Preet Singh. Days later, some scenes on Ram and Vennela Kishore were shot at Rajiv Gandhi International Airport. On 27 July 2014 Ram participated in an action sequence which was shot on a hilltop near Hyderabad. It was announced that on the schedule's completion in September 2014, the filming would continue in United States and the principal photography would end there on 15 November 2014. Meanwhile, the next schedule began on 15 August 2014.

A romantic song and a few key scenes were shot in Pollachi in that schedule. That schedule ended on 22 August 2014 and a new schedule started at Pollachi. A few action sequences were shot under the supervision of Stun Shiva until 30 August 2014. With this, most of the film's shoot was completed. The film's team returned from Pollachi on 14 September 2014 and the next schedule started at Hyderabad on the next day. Sonal Chauhan joined the film's sets at Annapurna Studios on 29 October 2014. Few key scenes on Ram, Rakul Preet and Sonal Chauhan were shot at Ramoji Film City in mid-December 2014. Rakul Preet revealed in an interview that she would participate in the shoot of the film's climax at Samalkota after completing the climax shoot of Shimla Mirchi.

The audio and theatrical trailer was launched on 1 May 2015 and the film was scheduled to release on 15 May 2015. However, the movie got a new release date as 29 May 2015.

== Music ==
S. Thaman composed the music for this film marking his hat-trick collaboration with Gopichand Malineni. The music sittings started at Thaman's music studio in Chennai where Gopichand Malineni, Ram and lyricist Bhaskarabhatla were also present. In early June 2014, the makers informed to the media that the music sittings were still ongoing under the supervision of Thaman. The music sittings ended on 16 June 2014. The audio was finally launched on 1 May 2015. The song "Ye Pilla Pilla" was based on "You're My Darling" from the delayed film Vaalu, which also had music by Thaman.

Pandaga Chesko

Soundtrack album by S. Thaman
- Released: 1 May 2015
- Recorded: 2014
- Genre: Film soundtrack
- Length: 19:28
- Label: Aditya Music
- Producer: S. Thaman

S. Thaman chronology
Kanchana 2 (2015)	Pandaga Chesko (2015)	Kick 2 (2015)

Track list
No.	Title	Lyrics	Artist(s)	Length
1.	"Life Is Beautiful"	Chandrabose	Deepak, Rude, AK	3:53
2.	"Dorikaade Dorikaade"	Bhaskarabhatla Ravi Kumar	Megha	3:31
3.	"Ye Pilla Pilla"	Bhaskarabhatla Ravi Kumar	S. Thaman	4:35
4.	"Chuda Sakagunnave"	Bhaskarabhatla Ravi Kumar	Mansi, Rita, S. Thaman	4:04
5.	"Pandaga Chesko"	Bhaskarabhatla Ravi Kumar	Simha, Sri Krishna, Geetha Madhuri, Anjana	3:25
Total length:				19:28

== Release ==
The film released on 29 May 2015 worldwide. The film had a prerelease business of ₹15.8 crore (US$1.6 million) including AP, overseas, and the rest of India.

=== Critical reception ===
Idlebrain rated the film 3/5 and stated, "Pandaga Chesko is a film with good interval twist and some laughs here and there. Plus points of the movie are performance by Ram and family orientation. But, the story and scenes in the movie lack freshness. This movie has commercial entertainment and family emotions. The success of this movie depends on how family crowds embrace it!" APToday rated it 2.75 out of 5 and stated, "Pandaga Chesko gives a deja vu feeling throughout the course of the movie. What works against the film is the fact that neither the story nor the format was chosen to narrate it is refreshing in any way. How long does this so-called Star Writers use the same old formula again and again? Wake up guys, It's never too late...!"

The Hindu called it a formulaic film with a strong screenplay that brings laughter "at regular intervals".

=== Box office ===
Pandaga Chesko opened to occupancy ranging 65%–75% on its first day, collecting ₹2.5 crore (US$260,000) (share). On the second day, its collection dropped around to 20 per cent. The film collected approximately ₹2 crore (US$210,000) (share) on the second day. Its two-day global total collection stands at ₹4.5 crore (US$470,000). The movie managed to collect a share of ₹10.15 crore (US$1.1 million) worldwide in 7 days. On the second week, the movie collected a total gross collection of ₹22.9 crore (US$2.4 million) worldwide giving a distributor share of ₹13.55 crore (US$1.4 million) which The Times of AP called "above average". Finally, The movie collected an estimated gross collection of ₹28.2 crore (US$2.9 million) worldwide giving a distributor share of ₹15.44 crore (US$1.6 million) and managed to recover its investment.
