= Bharath Raju =

Indian actor

- Occupation: Actor
- Years active: 2004–2017
- Relatives: Ravi Teja (brother)

Bharath Raju was an Indian actor who works in Telugu-language films in supporting roles. He is best known for his roles in Mangatayaru Tiffin Center (2008), Ready (2008) and Jump Jilani (2014). He is the brother of actor Ravi Teja.

== Personal life ==
In 2012, he was arrested alongside his brother Raghu for purchasing drugs from a Ugandan national in Hyderabad. In 2014, Hyderabad police questioned Raghu and a woman for leaving their cars parked on Kavuri Hills. An angered Bharath Raju abused the cops and was subsequently arrested.

He died in a car crash while speeding and drunk in the emergency lane on ORR in Hyderabad after hitting a lorry around 9:45 a.m. on 23 June 2017. Ravi Teja and his family except for Raghu notably skipped his brother's funeral since the family was shocked by his sudden death.

== Filmography ==
- Athade Oka Sainyam (2004)
- Venky (2004)
- Pedababu (2004)
- Okkade (2005)
- Danger (2005)
- Veerabhadra (2006)
- Dhee (2007)
- Mangatayaru Tiffin Center (2008)
- Ready (2008)
- Ek Niranjan (2009)
- Kalavar King (2010)
- Rama Rama Krishna Krishna (2010)
- Baava (2010)
- Dookudu (2011)
- Bejawada (2011)
- Bodyguard (2012)
- Ramayya Vasthavayya (2013)
- Biskett (2013)
- Jump Jilani (2014)
- Rabhasa (2014)
- Dohchay (2015)
- Sher (2015)
- Aa Mugguru (2016)
- Mister (2017)
