= Nallamalupu Bujji =

Indian film producer in Telugu cinema

- Born: Nallamalupu Srinivas Reddy; Guntur, Andhra Pradesh, India
- Occupations: Film Producer, Distributor
- Years active: 2001-present
- Relatives: Bellamkonda Suresh (Uncle)

Nallamalupu Bujji is an Indian film producer in Telugu cinema. In 2001, he ventured into film production, by forming Sri Lakshmi Narasimha Productions. He won two Nandi Awards.

== Filmography ==
=== As producer ===
Key
†	Denotes films that have not yet been released

Year	Title	Notes
2001	Raa	
2006	Lakshmi	
2007	Lakshyam	
2008	Chintakayala Ravi	
2009	Konchem Ishtam Konchem Kashtam	
2011	Nenu Naa Rakshasi	
2011	Mogudu	
2011	Kanchana	Telugu version only; Co-production with Bellamkonda Suresh
2014	Race Gurram	
2014	Alludu Seenu	Co-production with Bellamkonda Suresh
2014	Rabhasa	Co-production with Bellamkonda Suresh
2014	Mukunda	Co-production with Tagore Madhu
2015	Upendra 2	Telugu version only
2017	Winner	Co-production with Tagore Madhu
2017	Mister	Co-production with Tagore Madhu
2018	Touch Chesi Chudu	Co-production with Vallabhaneni Vamsi

=== As executive producer ===
Key
†	Denotes films that have not yet been released

Year	Title
1999	Sambayya
2000	Maa Annayya
2001	Cheppalani Vundhi
2002	Aadi
2002	Chennakesava Reddy
2003	Kalyana Ramudu

== Awards ==
Nandi Awards

- Best Feature Film – Bronze – Lakshyam (2007)
- Best Home Viewing Feature Film – Konchem Ishtam Konchem Kashtam (2009)

Other Awards

- B. Nagi Reddy Memorial Award – Race Gurram (shared with Dr. Venkateswara Rao)
- Santosham Best Producer Award – Race Gurram (shared with Dr. Venkateswara Rao)
