= Don Seenu =

- Promotional poster
- Directed by: Gopichand Malineni
- Screenplay by: Kona Venkat; Gopichand Malineni
- Story by: Gopichand Malineni
- Produced by: R. R. Venkat
- Starring: Ravi Teja; Shriya Saran; Anjana Sukhani; Srihari; Sayaji Shinde
- Cinematography: Sameer Reddy
- Edited by: Gautham Raju
- Music by: Mani Sharma
- Production company: R. R. Movie Makers
- Distributed by: R. R. Movie Makers; Lotus Five Star; Great India Films
- Release dates: 21 June 2010 (Malaysia); 6 August 2010 (India)
- Running time: 165 minutes
- Country: India
- Language: Telugu
- Budget: ₹23 crore
- Box office: ₹16 crore distributors' share

Don Seenu is a 2010 Indian Telugu-language action comedy film directed by Gopichand Malineni and produced by R. R. Venkat. The film stars Ravi Teja, Shriya Saran, and Anjana Sukhani in the lead roles, while Srihari and Sayaji Shinde play supporting roles. The music was composed by Mani Sharma with cinematography by Sameer Reddy and editing by Gautham Raju. The film was released on 6 August 2010 and became a commercial super hit at the box office. The film was dubbed twice in Hindi as Sabse Bada Don in 2011 and 2022.

== Plot ==
Srinivasa Rao aka Seenu dreams of becoming a gangster and always likes to be called "Don Seenu" since childhood due to the strong influence of the Amitabh Bachchan starrer Don. Due to his enterprising nature, Seenu gains access to the cream of the city's gangsters and uses his cleverness to play off the top two gangsters and fierce rivals: Madhavpur Machiraju and Narsingh. Seenu wants to join one of the dons and grow up in the ranks, where he joins hands with Machiraju.

In the process, Seenu is given a task to leave for Germany and win the heart of Narsingh's sister, whose marriage is fixed with Praveen Duggal, the son of Dubai-based crime boss Mukesh Duggal. Seenu goes to Germany and wins the heart of Deepthi but later discovers that he was shown the wrong girl. The wrong girl is none other than Machiraju's sister Deepthi. When Machiraju discovers that his henchman is the one who showed the wrong girl, Machiraju attempts to kill his henchman. Seenu manages to impress Deepthi and arrives back in India.

When Deepthi and Priya confront Seenu about the confusion, Seenu reveals that their brothers Narsingh and Machiraju were best friends turned foes, and his sister Lakshmi is Narsingh's estranged wife who was separated due to Machiraju's antics and Panduranga Rao's plan and thus wanted to prove his innocence by joining the gang. Mukesh calls Machiraju and Narsingh at the docks, where Seenu arrives with Lakshmi and makes Machiraju prove her innocence. Narsingh apologizes to Lakshmi, and they reconcile with each other and their child. A fight ensues where Seenu defeats Mukesh and happily leaves with his family.

== Cast ==
- Ravi Teja as Srinivasa Rao aka Don Seenu
- Shriya Saran as Deepthi, Machiraju's sister
- Anjana Sukhani as Priya, Narsingh's sister
- Srihari as Narsingh
- Sayaji Shinde as Madhavpur Machiraju, Narsingh's rival
- Kasthuri Shankar as Lakshmi, Seenu's cousin and Narsingh's wife
- Brahmanandam as Vishwas
- Ali as Rama Rao / Rams
- Mahesh Manjrekar as Mukesh Duggal
- John Kokken as Praveen Duggal
- Sudha as Bhavani, Seenu's mother
- Satyam Rajesh as Seenu's friend
- Raghu Babu as Tambaraju, Narsingh's henchman
- Duvvasi Mohan as Narsingh's gang member
- Raja Ravindra as Narsingh's secret informer
- Brahmaji as Bobby, Machiraju's henchman
- Surekha Vani as Machiraju's wife
- Raghu Karumanchi as Machiraju's henchman
- Fish Venkat as Machiraju's henchman
- Banerjee as Duggal's henchman
- Venu Madhav as Madhu Pitre
- Vijay Sai as Seenu's friend
- Venu Yeldandi as a bar waiter
- Yashpal Sharma as Baiju
- Gundu Sudarshan as Accountant
- Prabhas Sreenu as Seenu's friend
- Delhi Rajeswari
- Siddhu Jonnalagadda as Sreeja's Boyfriend

== Production ==
Trisha was signed as the lead but she was replaced by Shriya Saran later, which marks her return to Telugu cinema after five years.

== Soundtrack ==
Don Seenu

Soundtrack album by Mani Sharma
- Released: 22 July 2010
- Recorded: 2010
- Genre: Feature film soundtrack
- Length: 24:32
- Label: Aditya Music
- Producer: Mani Sharma

Mani Sharma chronology
Subhapradam (2010)	Don Seenu (2010)	Koothimuka (2010)

Don Seenu's soundtrack is composed by Mani Sharma. The soundtrack album, which was released on 22 July at Taj Deccan Hotel in Hyderabad, Noted director Dasari Narayana Rao released the first audio CD, whereas movie mughal D. Ramanaidu released the audio cassette. It features 6 songs, with one being a remix.

Track-List
No.	Title	Lyrics	Singer(s)	Length
1.	"Aidhella Vayasu"	Ramajogayya Sastry	Baba Sehgal	4:53
2.	"Raja Raja Ravi Teja"	Ramajogayya Sastry	Sri Krishna, Geetha Madhuri	4:15
3.	"Nayanakana"	Bhaskarabhatla Ravi Kumar	Venu, Rita, Bhargavi Pillai	4:11
4.	"Aduguthundi"	Vennelakanti	Hemachandra, Malavika	4:25
5.	"Andhamemo Istaraku"	Bhaskarabhatla Ravi Kumar	Hemachandra, Malavika	4:17
6.	"Aidhella Vayasu (Remix)"	Ramajogayya Sastry	Baba Sehgal	3:14
Total length:				25:25

== Reception ==
Radhika Rajamani of Rediff.com rated the film 2.5 out of 5 stars and wrote, "Don Seenu is an out and out commercial potboiler which provides mindless entertainment. It's Ravi Teja's show all the way!"
