= Bodyguard (2012 film) =

2012 Indian film by Gopichand Malineni

- Theatrical release poster
- Directed by: Gopichand Malineni
- Screenplay by: Gopichand Malineni
- Based on: Body Guard by Siddique
- Produced by: Bellamkonda Suresh
- Starring: Venkatesh; Trisha; Prakash Raj
- Cinematography: Shyam K. Naidu
- Edited by: Gautham Raju
- Music by: S. Thaman
- Production company: Sri Sai Ganesh Productions
- Distributed by: WalkerIBC Studios
- Release date: 14 January 2012
- Running time: 155 minutes
- Country: India
- Language: Telugu
- Box office: est. ₹17.5 crore distributors' share

Bodyguard is a 2012 Indian Telugu-language romantic action comedy film produced by Bellamkonda Suresh under the Sri Sai Ganesh Productions banner and directed by Gopichand Malineni. The film stars Venkatesh, Trisha and Prakash Raj with music composed by S. Thaman. It is a remake of the 2010 Malayalam film of the same name.

The film was released on 14 January 2012 on the occasion of Sankranti to positive reviews. Following the positive reviews, Bodyguard went on to become a decent hit at the box office, collecting a distributor's share of over ₹17.5 crore.

== Plot ==
Venkatadri (Venkatesh) is a tough bodyguard who is assigned to protect the family of Varadarajula Naidu (Prakash Raj). Keerthi (Trisha) is the college-going daughter of Naidu and Venkatadri accompanies her to the college to keep a watch. Fed up with the close scrutiny maintained by Venkatadri, Keerthi hatches a plan with her friend Swathi (Saloni Aswani) to divert Venkatadri's attention. Keerthi tries to get away from Venkatedri by calling him from a private number. Venkatadri falls in love with the girl without knowing that it is Keerthi herself. At one point, Keerthi too feels herself becoming attracted to Venkatadri and expresses her desire to meet him in person. She tells Venkatadri to meet at a railway station and elope with her. Venkatadri agrees, unaware it is Keerthi.

Naidu comes to think that Venkatadri and Keerthi are going to run away. In order to save Venkatadri from Naidu's anger, Keerthi lies that Venkatadri is meeting another girl at the train station. Naidu lets Venkatadri leave as he is desperate but tells his henchmen to kill Venkatadri if a girl does not come there at the station (which implies that Keerthi loves Venkatadri). Terrified, Keerthi sends Swathi to the station and tells her to tell Venkatadri that she is the lover and that she won't be able to make it to the station. Swathi, seeing Venkatadri, falls in love after all that has happened, and pretends that she is the lover. Keerthi calls her, but Swathi throws the cell phone away, hoping to erase Keerthi from his life completely.

Many years later, after Venkatadri and Swathi's marriage, they have a son. Swathi passes away shortly after. However, before her death, she leaves a diary for her son that outlines the whole story between the phone calls of Venkatadri and Keerthi and their love. The son later goes to Keerthi's house with Venkatadri to visit an elderly Naidu. Venkatadri is shocked that Keerthi has remained unmarried. The son asks Keerthi to come with him and become his mother and Venkatadri is angry at his son for saying something so blunt and rude. But Naidu begs Venkatadri to take Keerthi as his wife. So they go on to the train together but the son runs away before leaving and throws the diary into a trashcan nearby. Venkatadri finds the diary and realizes soon that his real lover, the girl who had waited for him for so many years faithfully, was Keerthi. He calls Keerthi on her cell phone and addresses her as Bangaram. Keerthi is overwhelmed with joy and happiness, realizing that Venkatadri has come to know the truth and her identity. She runs toward Venkatadri and they both hug each other while his son is happily watching them.

== Cast ==
- Venkatesh as Venkatadri "Venky"
- Trisha as Keerthi
- Saloni Aswani as Swathi
- Prakash Raj as Varadarajula Naidu
- Kota Srinivasa Rao as Siva Reddy
- Jaya Prakash Reddy as College Principal
- Subbaraju as Shankaram
- Tanikella Bharani as Mohan Rao
- Ali as Bapatla
- Pragathi as Keerthi's mother
- Dharmavarapu Subramanyam as Subrahmanyam
- M. S. Narayana as Economics Lecturer
- Venu Madhav as Cash Reddy
- Praveen as Cash Reddy's friend
- Thagubothu Ramesh
- Gundu Sudarshan
- Amit Tiwari
- Adarsh Balakrishna
- Fish Venkat
- Raghu Karumanchi as Cash Reddy's friend
- Sana as Venkatadri's mother
- Ping Pong Surya as Cash Reddy's friend
- Bharath Raju
- Sravan
- Ambati Srinivas
- Lahari
- Bhavani
- Rani
- Master Athulith
- Meenakshi Dixit (guest appearance)

== Soundtrack ==
Bodyguard

Soundtrack album by S. Thaman
- Released: 13 December 2011
- Recorded: 2011
- Genre: Film soundtrack
- Length: 24:30
- Label: Aditya Music
- Producer: S. Thaman

S. Thaman chronology
Mouna Guru (2011)	Bodyguard (2011)	Businessman (2011)

Music was composed by S. Thaman. Music was released on ADITYA Music Company. The music was launched on 13 December 2011 at Shilpakala Vedika.

No.	Title	Lyrics	Singer(s)	Length
1.	"Body Guard (Nuvvu Puttagaaney)"	Bhaskarabhatla	Baba Sehgal, Ramya, Naveen Madhav, M. L. R. Karthikeyan, Rahul Nambiar	3:26
2.	"Hosannaa (Adugaduguna Ninu Chusaa)"	Anantha Sreeram	Sri Vardhini, Rahul Nambiar	4:42
3.	"Oh My Goduu"	Anantha Sreeram	Ranjith, Geetha Madhuri, Bindu	4:37
4.	"Yevvaro"	Sri Mani	Karthik	4:37
5.	"Jiya jaley"	Ramajogayya Sastry	Haricharan, Rita, Sravana Bhargavi, Harini	4:12
6.	"Endhukoo (Kaavalanukunnaa Premani)"	Ramajogayya Sastry	Shweta Pandit, S. Thaman, Haricharan	2:12
Total length:				24:30

== Production ==
After finalising on the remake, producer Bellamkonda Suresh and actor Venkatesh approached Siddique, the director of the original Malayalam version to direct the Telugu version. He declined the offer, feeling that after remaking the Malayalam original in Tamil (as Kaavalan) and Hindi (under the same title), "another time would be an overkill for me". Later, Gopichand Malineni was chosen as the director. The first look of the film was revealed in August 2011 through a poster. Soon after action scenes were shot at an aluminium factory at Gachibowli in Hyderabad.

== Reception ==
Bodyguard received generally positive reviews from critics. Hindustan Times rated it 3 out of 5, calling it a "perfect family entertainer". SuperGoodMovies.com predicted that it will do well at the box office "as it has the right mix of commercial elements for the festive audience", rating it 3 out of 5.

Film critic Hemanth Kumar of Postnoon also said that Bodyguard comes with a good package of comedy, drama and romance, and that you could watch it if you haven't watched the original. fullhyd.com's Deepa Garimella rated the film 7/10, calling it "a film with the right ingredients in the right mix". Cinegoer.com's Y Sunita Chowdary also recommended the film, noting that "Venky's films don't make noise but move silently stealthily towards the goal".

== Awards ==
Ceremony	Category	Nominee	Result	Ref.
2nd South Indian International Movie Awards	SIIMA Award for Best Supporting Actress (Telugu)	Saloni	Won	
Filmfare South Awards	Filmfare Award for Best Supporting Actress – Telugu	Saloni	Nominated	
