= Sriwass =

Indian film director, and screenwriter (born 1973)

Sriwass Oleti
- Born: 23 November 1973 (age 51); Purushothapatnam, Andhra Pradesh, India
- Occupation(s): Film director Screen writer

Sriwass is an Indian film director, and screenwriter known for his works in Telugu cinema. He is known for directing comedy and action films like Loukyam and Dictator.

== Filmography ==
Key
†	Denotes film or TV productions that have not yet been released

Year	Film
2007	Lakshyam
2010	Rama Rama Krishna Krishna
2014	Pandavulu Pandavulu Tummeda
2014	Loukyam
2016	Dictator
2018	Saakshyam
2023	Ramabanam
