= Lakshyam (2007 film) =

- Movie poster
- Directed by: Sriwass
- Written by: M. Ratnam (dialogues)
- Screenplay by: Sriwass; Gopimohan (Co-Screenplay)
- Story by: Sriwass
- Produced by: Nallamalapu Srinivas (Bujji)
- Starring: Gopichand; Jagapati Babu; Anushka Shetty
- Cinematography: Sekhar V. Joseph
- Edited by: Gautham Raju
- Music by: Mani Sharma
- Production company: Sri Lakshmi Narasimha Productions
- Release date: 5 July 2007
- Running time: 164 minutes
- Country: India
- Language: Telugu
- Box office: ₹15 crore distributors' share

Lakshyam (transl. Target) is a 2007 Indian Telugu-language action comedy film directed by Srivass, and produced by Nallamalupu Srinivas (Bujji) for Sri Lakshmi Narasimha Productions. It stars Gopichand, Jagapati Babu, Anushka Shetty and music is composed by Mani Sharma. It was later remade in Tamil as Maanja Velu (2010), in Bengali as Fighter (2011), and in Kannada as Varadhanayaka (2013). The film won two Nandi Awards and one Filmfare Award.

== Cast ==
- Gopichand as Chandu
- Jagapati Babu as ACP Subash Chandra Bose
- Anushka Shetty as Indu
- Yashpal Sharma as Section Shankar
- Amit Tiwari as Shafi
- Ashish Vidyarthi as DIG Ajay Prakash
- Devraj as DIG Hari Narayan
- Kota Srinivasa Rao as Chandu and Bose's father
- Kalyani as Bose's wife
- Brahmanandam as Brahmam
- Ali as Bokkanna
- Venu Madhav as Venu
- Ahuti Prasad as GV Prasad, Indu's father
- Pragathi as Indu's mother
- Surya as Bank Manager
- Raghu Babu as Shankar's henchman
- Ravi Babu as Sattibabu
- Chalapathi Rao as Sattibabu's father
- Srinivasa Reddy as Blade Seenu, Sattibabu's friend
- Dharmavarapu Subramanyam as Inspector Rao
- Revathi as Padma, Indu's cousin
- Shankar Melkote as Mall Manager
- Lakshmipati as GV Prasad's assistant
- Fish Venkat as a goon at railway station
- Giridhar as Giri, Chandu's friend
- Chitti as Chitti

== Soundtrack ==
Lakshyam

Film score by Mani Sharma
- Released: 10 June 2007
- Recorded: 2007
- Genre: Soundtrack
- Length: 25:00
- Label: Aditya Music
- Producer: Mani Sharma

Mani Sharma chronology
Dubai Seenu (2007)	Lakshyam (2007)	Chirutha (2007)

The music was composed by Mani Sharma and was released with the Aditya Music label.

No.	Title	Lyrics	Singer(s)	Length
1.	"Sukku Sukku"	Chandrabose	Tippu, Sujatha	4:11
2.	"Chekkara Keli"	Ramajogayya Sastry	Karthik, Shreya Ghoshal	4:24
3.	"Gullo Devudu"	Chandrabose	Madhu Balakrishnan	4:16
4.	"Niluvave"	Kosaraju	Hemachandra	3:08
5.	"Yevadu Yevadu"	Chandrabose	Ranjith	5:07
6.	"Sukku Sukku (Remix)"	Chandrabose	Tippu, Sujatha	3:54
Total length:				25:00

== Reception ==
A critic from Rediff.com wrote that "The film is good with some good action and sentiment. And it does not bore the viewer". Jeevi of Idlebrain.com wrote that "First half is entertaining with perfect blend of entertainment and emotion. The tempo goes down a bit in second half because of formulaic narration and predictability in the story".

== Awards ==
Nandi Awards - 2007

- Third Best Feature Film - Bronze - Nallamalupu Bujji
- Best Supporting Actor - Jagapati Babu

Filmfare Awards South

- Filmfare Award for Best Supporting Actor – Telugu - Jagapati Babu
