= Shruti Haasan filmography =

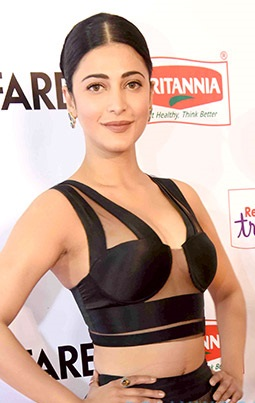
Haasan in 2014

Shruti Haasan is an Indian actress and singer who works in Telugu, Tamil and Hindi films. She started her career as a playback singer at the age of six in the 1992 Tamil film Thevar Magan. She had a brief role in her father, Kamal Haasan's Tamil-Hindi directorial Hey Ram (2000) as a child artist. Haasan's first major appearance was in the Hindi film Luck (2009), in which she played a dual role of a woman avenging her twin sister's death. She played the female lead in the films Anaganaga O Dheerudu and 7 Aum Arivu; both were released in 2011 and together earned her the Best Female Debut – South at the 59th Filmfare Awards South ceremony.

Haasan's subsequent releases Oh My Friend (2011) and 3 (2012) were commercially unsuccessful. The latter earned her a nomination for the Best Actress – Tamil at the 60th Filmfare Awards South ceremony. A turning point came in Haasan's career with Harish Shankar's commercially successful Telugu film Gabbar Singh (2012). The release was followed by a series of successful films such as Balupu (2013) and Yevadu (2014). She received her first Filmfare Award for Best Actress – Telugu for her performance in Race Gurram (2014).

In 2015, Haasan played the female lead in five films: Gabbar Is Back and Welcome Back in Hindi, Srimanthudu in Telugu, and Puli and Vedalam in Tamil. Except Puli, the rest of the releases achieved commercial success. She earned a nomination for the Best Actress – Telugu award at the 63rd Filmfare Awards South ceremony for her performance in Srimanthudu. The following year, she had two releases: Rocky Handsome and Premam. The latter, a Telugu remake of the 2015 Malayalam-language film of the same name, drew criticism for Haasan's casting before its release. She played the role of a young college lecturer with a slightly stern approach towards her students. The remake gained positive critical reception, and earned average returns. Her Tamil film Si3 had a theatrical release in 2017; it was a commercial success. Following a career downturn and hiatus, Haasan has appeared in Krack (2021), Veera Simha Reddy (2023), Waltair Veerayya (2023), Salaar: Part 1 – Ceasefire (2023) and Coolie (2025), all of which ranks among the list of highest-grossing films.

== Films ==
Key
†	Denotes films that have not yet been released

List of Shruti Haasan film credits
Year	Title	Role	Language	Notes	Ref.
2000	Hey Ram	Vallabhbhai Patel's daughter	Tamil	Child artist	
2000	Hey Ram	Vallabhbhai Patel's daughter	Hindi	Child artist	
2009	Luck	Ayesha, Natasha (Note: Haasan played dual roles in the film.)	Hindi		
2011	Anaganaga O Dheerudu	Priya	Telugu		
2011	Dil Toh Baccha Hai Ji	Nikki Narang	Hindi		
2011	7 Aum Arivu	Subha Srinivasan	Tamil		
2011	Oh My Friend	Siri Chandana	Telugu		
2012	3	Janani Ramachandran	Tamil		
2012	Gabbar Singh	Bhagyalakshmi	Telugu		
2013	Balupu	Shruti	Telugu		
2013	Ramaiya Vastavaiya	Sona Singh	Hindi		
2013	D-Day	Suraiya	Hindi		
2013	Ramayya Vasthavayya	Ammulu	Telugu		
2014	Yevadu	Manju	Telugu		
2014	Race Gurram	Spandana "Sweety"	Telugu		
2014	Aagadu	Dancer	Telugu	Special appearance in song "Junction Lo"	
2014	Poojai	Divya	Tamil		
2015	Tevar	Dancer	Hindi	Special appearance in the song "Madamiyan"	
2015	Gabbar Is Back	Advocate Shruti	Hindi		
2015	Srimanthudu	Charuseela	Telugu		
2015	Welcome Back	Ranjana Shetty	Hindi		
2015	Puli	Pavazhamalli	Tamil		
2015	Vedalam	Swetha	Tamil		
2016	Rocky Handsome	Rukshida Ahlawat	Hindi		
2016	Premam	Sithara Venkatesan	Telugu		
2017	Singam 3	Vidhya / Agni (Note: Haasan played a single character with two or more names)	Tamil		
2017	Katamarayudu	Avanthika	Telugu		
2017	Behen Hogi Teri	Binny Arora	Hindi		
2020	Yaara	Sukanya	Hindi		
2020	Putham Pudhu Kaalai	Ramya	Tamil	Segment "Coffee, Anyone?"	
2020	Devi	Maya	Hindi	Short film	
2021	Krack	Kalyani Shankar	Telugu		
2021	The Power	Parveen / Pari	Hindi		
2021	Pitta Kathalu	Divya	Telugu	Segment: xLife	
2021	Vakeel Saab	Amrutha Konidela	Telugu	Special appearance	
2021	Laabam	Clara	Tamil		
2023	Veera Simha Reddy	Isha Jai Simha Reddy	Telugu		
2023	Waltair Veerayya	RAW Agent Athidhi	Telugu		
2023	The Eye	Diana	English		
2023	Hi Nanna	Model	Telugu	Special appearance	
2023	Salaar: Part 1 – Ceasefire	Aadhya Krishnakanth	Telugu		
2025	Coolie	Preethi Rajashekar	Tamil		
2026	Silent Screams	Narrator	Telugu	Documentary film	
2026	Peddi	Bella Adilakshmi	Telugu	Special appearance in the song "Hellallallo"	
2026	Aakasamlo Oka Tara	Rohini	Telugu		
2026	Train †	TBA	Tamil	Post-production	

== Television ==
Key
†	Denotes TV series that have not yet been released

List of Shruti Haasan television credits
Year	Title	Role	Language	Notes	Ref.
2018	Hello Sago	Host	Tamil	Talk show	
2019	Treadstone	Nira Patel	English	Recurring role; episode 6	
2022	Bestseller	Meethu Mathur / Adya Jaisingh	Hindi		

== Music video appearances ==
List of Shruti Haasan music video appearances
Year	Title	Language	Artist	Director	Ref.
2010	"Semmozhi Anthem"	Tamil	Music by AR Rahman, Lyrics by Kalaignar M Karunanidhisung by various artists	Gautham Vasudev Menon	
2024	"Inimel"	Tamil	Lokesh Kanagaraj	Dwarkesh Prabakar	

== See also ==
- List of awards and nominations received by Shruti Haasan
