= Shruti Haasan discography =

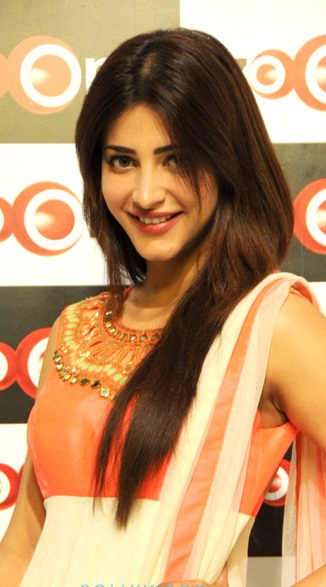
Haasan in 2016

Shruti Haasan is an Indian actress, composer and playback singer who primarily works in Tamil, Telugu and Hindi films. Haasan sang her first song aged just six in her father's Thevar Magan, a composition of Ilaiyaraaja. While in school, Haasan made her singing debut in the Hindi language film Chachi 420, which was directed by her father. Haasan sang the bilingual versions of the title theme "Rama Rama" with her father, in Hindi and in Tamil, for the film Hey Ram. The album from Ilaiyaraaja, which was critically praised, won Haasan accolades for her efforts with Screen India saying that she "has the makings of a good singer, and with some training she should go great guns."

Haasan sang along with veteran singer K. J. Yesudas for the film En Mana Vaanil (2002), under Ilaiyaraaja's music. She has sung for Gautham Vasudev Menon's Vaaranam Aayiram, under the composition of Harris Jayaraj. As of November 2008, Haasan is also midway through her untitled debut album, which she has composed, written and sung, and is set for release in mid-2009. A further song was recorded with her voice for her Hindi film Luck. In September 2010, Haasan collaborated with Dave Kushner for the film Hisss. Whilst Kushner composed the track, Haasan wrote the lyrics, sang and appeared in a promotional video for the film. She recently lent her voice for the Telugu film Aagadu, which was confirmed by director Srinu Vaitla via Twitter. After much speculation, Haasan was finalised as the music composer of the Tamil film Unnaipol Oruvan, which was released in 2009. The bilingual film was a remake of the Hindi film A Wednesday!. The soundtracks of both the projects are separate. Apart from this, Haasan is also the vocalist of an alternative rock band, The Extramentals. Haasan released her new song "Edge", which she collaborated with her band in the UK. The song crossed more than 1 million views on YouTube.

Haasan's notable songs include: "Adiye Kolluthe" from Vaaranam Aayiram (2008), "Yellae Lama" from 7 Aum Arivu (2011), "Down Down" from Race Gurram (2014), "Don't You Mess With Me" from Vedalam (2015), "Odiyamma" from Hi Nanna (2023) and "It's a Break Up Da" from Kadhalikka Neramillai (2025). In 2025, she also performed a song "Vinveli Nayaga", in her father's film Thug Life. The song won her the SIIMA Award for Best Female Playback Singer - Tamil.

== Playback singer ==
| Year | Film | Title | Composer | Language | Notes | Ref. |
|---|---|---|---|---|---|---|
| 1992 | Thevar Magan | "Potri Paadadi Ponne" | Ilaiyaraaja | Tamil | | |
| 1997 | Ullaasam | "Valibam Vaazha Sollum" | Karthik Raja | Tamil | | |
| 1997 | Chachi 420 | "Chupadi Chupadi Chaachi" | Vishal Bhardwaj | Hindi | | |
| 2000 | Hey Ram | "Ram Ram Hey Ram" | Ilaiyaraaja | Tamil; Hindi | | |
| 2002 | En Mana Vaanil | "Roatoram" | Ilaiyaraaja | Tamil | | |
| 2008 | Vaaranam Aayiram | "Adiye Kolluthe" | Harris Jayaraj | Tamil | | |
| 2009 | Luck | "Aazma (Luck Is The Key)" | Salim–Sulaiman | Hindi | | |
| 2009 | Unnaipol Oruvan | "Allah Jaane" | Herself | Tamil | | |
| 2009 | Unnaipol Oruvan | "Unnaipol Oruvan" | Herself | Tamil | | |
| 2009 | Unnaipol Oruvan | "Vaanam Ellai" | Herself | Tamil | | |
| 2009 | Eenadu | "Allah Jaane" | Herself | Telugu | | |
| 2009 | Eenadu | "Eenadu" | Herself | Telugu | | |
| 2009 | Eenadu | "Ningi Haddu" | Herself | Telugu | | |
| 2010 | Non-album single | "Semmozhiyaana Thamizh Mozhiyaam" | A. R. Rahman | Tamil | | |
| 2010 | Prithvi | "Nenapidu Nenapidu" | Manikanth Kadri | Kannada | | |
| 2010 | Hisss | "Beyond The Snake" | DKFP (David Kushner & Franky Perez) | English | | |
| 2011 | Udhayan | "Evan Ivan" | Manikanth Kadri | Tamil | | |
| 2011 | 7 Aum Arivu | "Yellae Lama" | Harris Jayaraj | Tamil | | |
| 2011 | Oh My Friend | "Sri Chaitanya Junior College" | R. Anil | Telugu | | |
| 2011 | Muppozhudhum Un Karpanaigal | "Sokkupodi" | G. V. Prakash Kumar | Tamil | | |
| 2012 | 3 | "Kannazhaga Kaalazhaga" | Anirudh Ravichander | Tamil | | |
| 2012 | 3 | "Kannulada" | Anirudh Ravichander | Telugu | Dubbed versions | |
| 2012 | 3 | "Tan Ye Mera" | Anirudh Ravichander | Hindi | Dubbed versions | |
| 2013 | D-Day | "Alvida" | Shankar–Ehsaan–Loy | Hindi | | |
| 2014 | Yennamo Yedho | "Shut Up Your Mouth" | D. Imman | Tamil | | |
| 2014 | Race Gurram | "Down Down" | S. Thaman | Telugu | | |
| 2014 | Aagadu | "Junction Lo" | S. Thaman | Telugu | | |
| 2014 | Maan Karate | "Un Vizhigalil" | Anirudh Ravichander | Tamil | | |
| 2015 | Tevar | "Joganiyan" | Sajid–Wajid | Hindi | | |
| 2015 | Shamitabh | "Stereophonic Sannata" | Ilaiyaraaja | Hindi | | |
| 2015 | Puli | "Yaendi Yaendi" | Devi Sri Prasad | Tamil | | |
| 2015 | Vedalam | "Don't You Mess With Me" | Anirudh Ravichander | Tamil | | |
| 2016 | Idhu Namma Aalu | "King Kong" | Kuralarasan | Tamil | | |
| 2019 | LKG | "Dappava Kizhichaan" | Leon James | Tamil | | |
| 2019 | Khamoshi | "Khamoshi Title Track" | Shamir Tandon | Hindi | | |
| 2019 | Kadaram Kondan | "Kadaram Kondan" | Ghibran | Tamil | | |
| 2020 | Non-album single | "Edge" | Herself | English | | |
| 2021 | Non-album single | "Arivum Anbum" | Ghibran | Tamil | | |
| 2021 | Non-album single | "Hum Hindustani" | Dilshaad Shabbir Shaikh | Hindi | | |
| 2021 | Laabam | "Yaazha Yaazha" | D. Imman | Tamil | | |
| 2022 | Non-album single | "She is a Hero" | Herself, MC Altaf, Niranjan Iyer | English, Hindi | | |
| 2023 | Non-album single | "Monster Machine" | Herself | English | | |
| 2023 | Hi Nanna | "Odiyamma" | Hesham Abdul Wahab | Telugu | | |
| 2023 | Hi Nanna | "Odiyamma" | Hesham Abdul Wahab | Tamil | Dubbed version | |
| 2023 | Toxic | "Toxic - Title OST" | Jeremy Stack | English | | |
| 2024 | Teenz | "Hey Nainika" | D. Imman | Tamil | | |
| 2025 | Eleven | "The Devil is Waiting" | D. Imman | Tamil | | |
| 2025 | Eleven | "The Devil is Waiting" | D. Imman | Telugu | | |
| 2025 | Kadhalikka Neramillai | "It's a Break Up Da" | A. R. Rahman | Tamil | | |
| 2025 | Thug Life | "Vinveli Nayaga" | A. R. Rahman | Tamil | | |
| 2026 | Train | "Kannakuzhikaaraa" | Mysskin | Tamil | | |
| 2027 | Varanasi | "Globetrotter Theme" | M. M. Keeravani | Telugu | | |

== Music composer ==
| Year | Album | Language | Notes | Ref. |
|---|---|---|---|---|
| 2009 | Unnaipol Oruvan | Tamil | | |
| 2009 | Eenadu | Telugu | | |

== See also ==
- Shruti Haasan filmography
