= List of awards and nominations received by Shruti Haasan =

Shruti Haasan awards and nominations
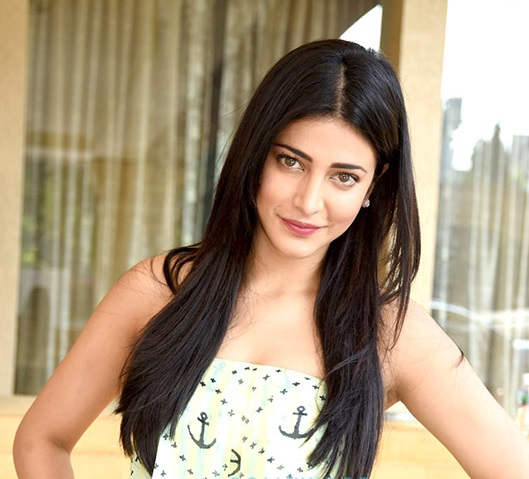
- Haasan in 2015
Awards and nominations
| Award | Wins | Nominations |
| CineMAA Awards | 1 | 1 |
| Edison Awards | 1 | 1 |
| Filmfare Awards South | 2 | 8 |
| IIFA Utsavam | 1 | 1 |
| South Indian International Movie Awards | 7 | 12 |
| Zee Telugu Apsara Awards | 1 | 3 |
| Other Awards | 2 | 9 |

Totals (Note: Certain award groups do not simply award one winner. They acknowledge several different recipients, have runners-up, and have third place. Since this is a specific recognition and is different from losing an award, runner-up mentions are considered wins in this award tally. For simplification and to avoid errors, each award in this list has been presumed to have had a prior nomination.)
- Wins: 18
- Nominations: 41

Shruti Haasan is an Indian actress and singer who works in Telugu, Hindi and Tamil films. She is a recipient of several awards including two Filmfare Award South and seven South Indian International Movie Awards, and one CineMAA Awards, Edison Awards and IIFA Utsavam each.

Haasan made her acting debut with the Hindi film Luck (2009). She made her Telugu debut with Anaganaga O Dheerudu and Tamil debut with 7 Aum Arivu both (2011), winning the Filmfare Award for Best Female Debut – South for both. She won the Filmfare Award for Best Actress – Telugu for Race Gurram. Haasan won three SIIMA Award for Best Actress – Telugu for the films - Gabbar Singh, Race Gurram and Srimanthudu. She also has won the Best Introduced Music Director for Unnaipol Oruvan.

== Asiavision Awards ==
Asiavision Awards have been held annually since 2006 to honor the artistes and technicians of Indian cinema and television.

| Year | Category | Film | Result | Ref. |
|---|---|---|---|---|
| 2013 | Excellence In Tamil Cinema | 3 | Won | |
| 2015 | Excellence In Tamil Cinema | Yevadu & Poojai | Won | |
| 2015 | Youth Icon of India - Female | —N/a | Won | |

== Chennai Times Film Awards ==
The Chennai Times Film Awards presented by The Times of India to celebrates the best in the Tamil film industry.

| Year | Category | Film | Result | Ref. |
|---|---|---|---|---|
| 2012 | Best Actor - Female | 7 Aum Arivu | Nominated | |
| 2013 | Best Actor - Female | 3 | Nominated | |

== CineMAA Awards ==
| Year | Category | Film | Result | Ref. |
|---|---|---|---|---|
| 2012 | Best Female Debut | Anaganaga O Dheerudu | Won | |

== Edison Awards ==
| Year | Category | Film | Result | Ref. |
|---|---|---|---|---|
| 2009 | Best Introduced Music Director | Unnaipol Oruvan | Won | |

== Filmfare Awards South ==
| Year | Category | Film | Result | Ref. |
|---|---|---|---|---|
| 2012 | Best Female Debut – South | 7 Aum Arivu & Anaganaga O Dheerudu | Won | |
| 2012 | Best Actress – Tamil | 7 Aum Arivu | Nominated | |
| 2013 | Best Actress – Tamil | 3 | Nominated | |
| 2013 | Best Female Playback Singer – Tamil | "Kannazhaga" (from 3) | Nominated | |
| 2015 | Best Actress – Telugu | Race Gurram | Won | |
| 2015 | Best Female Playback Singer – Telugu | "Junction Lo" (from Aagadu) | Nominated | |
| 2015 | Best Female Playback Singer – Tamil | "Yeandi Yeandi" (from Puli) | Nominated | |
| 2016 | Best Actress – Telugu | Srimanthudu | Nominated | |

== International Indian Film Academy Awards ==
| Year | Category | Film | Result | Ref. |
|---|---|---|---|---|
| 2014 | Best Supporting Actress | D-Day | Nominated | |

== IIFA Utsavam ==
| Year | Category | Film | Result | Ref. |
|---|---|---|---|---|
| 2016 | Performance In A Leading Role - Female | Srimanthudu | Won | |

== Screen Awards ==
| Year | Category | Film | Result | Ref. |
|---|---|---|---|---|
| 2016 | Best Ensemble Cast | Welcome Back | Nominated | |

== South Indian International Movie Awards ==
| Year | Category | Film | Result | Ref. |
|---|---|---|---|---|
| 2012 | Best Female Debut – Telugu | Anaganaga O Dheerudu | Won | |
| 2012 | Best Female Debut – Tamil | 7 Aum Arivu | Nominated | |
| 2013 | Best Actress – Tamil | 3 | Nominated | |
| 2013 | Best Female Playback Singer - Tamil | "Kannazhaga" (from 3) | Nominated | |
| 2013 | Best Actress – Telugu | Gabbar Singh | Won | |
| 2013 | Stylish Actress of South Indian Cinema | —N/a | Won | |
| 2014 | Best Actress – Telugu | Balupu | Nominated | |
| 2015 | Best Actress – Telugu | Race Gurram | Won | |
| 2016 | Best Actress – Telugu | Srimanthudu | Won | |
| 2022 | Best Actress – Telugu | Krack | Nominated | |
| 2023 | Fashion Youth Icon | —N/a | Won | |
| 2024 | Best Actress – Telugu | Veera Simha Reddy | Nominated | |
| 2024 | Entertainer of the Year | —N/a | Won | |
| 2026 | Best Female Playback Singer - Tamil | "Vinveli Nayaga" (from Thug Life) | Won | |

== Stardust Awards ==
| Year | Category | Film | Result | Ref. |
|---|---|---|---|---|
| 2010 | Superstar of Tomorrow – Female | Luck | Nominated | |

== Vijay Awards ==
| Year | Category | Film | Result | Ref. |
|---|---|---|---|---|
| 2012 | Best Debut Actress | 7 Aum Arivu | Nominated | |
| 2013 | Best Actress | 3 | Nominated | |
| 2013 | Favourite Heroine | 3 | Nominated | |
| 2015 | Favourite Heroine | Poojai | Nominated | |

== Zee Cine Awards Telugu ==
| Year | Category | Film | Result | Ref. |
|---|---|---|---|---|
| 2018 | Favorite Actor of the Year – Female | Katamarayudu | Nominated | |

== Zee Telugu Apsara Awards ==
| Year | Category | Film | Result | Ref. |
|---|---|---|---|---|
| 2016 | Heroine of the Year | Srimanthudu | Nominated | |
| 2016 | Entertainer of the Year | —N/a | Nominated | |
| 2018 | Iconic Actress of the Decade | —N/a | Won | |

== Other awards ==
| Year | Award | Category | Result | Ref. |
|---|---|---|---|---|
| 2021 | Filmfare Middle East Achievers | Art Icon | Won | |
| 2023 | Indian Achievers Award | Power Corridors | Won | |

== Other recognitions ==
=== Honours ===
- 2020: Haasan became the 9th Most Tweeted South Indian Actress of the Year.
- 2021: She was placed 25th in Forbes India's Most Influential Stars on Instagram in South cinema.
- 2023: Guest of Honour at Cannes Film Festival's round table conference on Gender Parity.
