= Aagadu (soundtrack) =

- Album Front cover

Soundtrack album by S. Thaman
- Released: 1 August 2014
- Recorded: 2013–2014
- Genre: Feature film soundtrack
- Length: 26:08
- Language: Telugu
- Label: Lahari Music
- Producer: S. Thaman

S. Thaman chronology
| Meaghamann (2014) | Aagadu (2014) | Vanmam (2014) |

Aagadu is the feature film soundtrack composed by S. Thaman for the Telugu film of the same name directed by Srinu Vaitla which stars Mahesh Babu, Tamannaah and Sonu Sood. This marks Thaman's 50th film as a music composer. The soundtrack consists of 5 songs and a Theme music all composed by Thaman while the lyrics were penned by Sri Mani and Bhaskarabhatla Ravikumar. The film's soundtrack was released on 15 August 2014 through Lahari Music by hosting a promotional event at Shilpakala Vedika in Hyderabad. The soundtrack opened to positive reception from critics and audience.

== Development ==
S. Thaman was selected as the music director of the film during the film's primary stages. This marked his third consecutive collaboration with Srinu Vaitla and third collaboration with Mahesh Babu. He was also the part of the technical crew of Dookudu which was also produced by 14 Reels Entertainment, directed by Srinu Vaitla and starring Mahesh Babu. Before the commencement of principal photography of the film, the music sitting sessions began in London in late July 2013 in which apart from Thaman, Srinu Vaitla and Mahesh Babu were present when the latter was busy with shooting for his film 1: Nenokkadine. On 28 October 2013 it was reported that Thaman started composing the music for this film and the Title song was being scored first. In early April 2014, it was reported that Thaman is insistent that Mahesh should sing a song in the film and is also taking the help of director Srinu Vaitla to convince him for the same. A source close to the unit says that the actor has asked for four days’ time before he gives his nod. Later Thaman said to the media that Mahesh is going to sing a song in the film. On 6 July 2014 Thaman went to Bellary to compose a song for the film and Sreenu Vaitla, Mahesh Babu participated in the music sessions.

On 11 July 2014 Thaman confirmed that the final composing schedule is underway on whose completion the composing of all the songs would come to an end. Thaman also informed later that the works regarding the item number in the album is in full-swing and added that he has received good inputs from Srinu Vaitla. It was known in mid-July 2014 that Shruti Haasan sang a song in this film's soundtrack. She sang the item number in the soundtrack to which she danced in the film and the song was recorded at Thaman's studio on 25 July 2014 which was confirmed by both of them and Srinu Vaitla in their respective Twitter pages. Shruti Haasan said that it was a different experience to sing that song which Thaman claimed as the highlight song of the album. On 3 August 2014 Thaman confirmed that the compositions for the songs have been completed and it was known that the soundtrack consists of 6 songs. It was known later that Bhaskarabhatla Ravikumar penned 3 songs in the film's soundtrack and Thaman expressed his confidence that one of the three songs titled Aaja Saroja will be a chart buster similar to the success of the song Sir Osthara from Businessman while the other two came out very well.

== Track listing ==
=== Telugu ===
All lyrics are written by Bhaskarabhatla Ravi Kumar, except "Aagadu" which was written by Sri Mani and "Junction Lo" co written by Bheems.

| No. | Title | Artist(s) | Length |
|---|---|---|---|
| 1. | "Aagadu" | Shankar Mahadevan | 4:11 |
| 2. | "Aaja Saroja" | Rahul Nambiar | 4:57 |
| 3. | "Junction Lo" | Shruti Haasan, Simha | 5:23 |
| 4. | "Bhelpuri" | Sooraj Santhosh, M. M. Manasi | 5:24 |
| 5. | "Nari Nari" | S. Thaman, Divya | 4:31 |
| 6. | "Feel of Aagadu" | Mahesh Babu, Srinu Vaitla, S. Thaman | 1:47 |

=== Tamil ===
All lyrics are written by were written by Arun Bharathi except for the songs Bhel Puri Kannal and Dairy Dairy Milky Dairy which had lyrics written by Meenatchisundaram.

| No. | Title | Artist(s) | Length |
|---|---|---|---|
| 1. | "Nee Thotta Udan" | Velmurugan | 4:16 |
| 2. | "Vaa Vaa Saroja" | Senthildas | 4:26 |
| 3. | "Junction La" | Vallavan, Nincy | 5:14 |
| 4. | "Bhel Puri Kannal" | Haripriya, Senthildas | 5:38 |
| 5. | "Dairy Dairy Milky Dairy" | Saritha Ram, Sunandhan | 3:54 |

== Release ==
In early February 2014, it was reported that the film's audio would release on 31 August 2014. In mid-February 2014, according to TFI's buzz the film makers planned to release the audio of the film on 31 May 2014 to coincide with the occasion of Krishna's birthday. However, after the declaration of the film's first look launch on 31 May 2014, the previous reports weren't taken into consideration. During an interaction with the media on 26 March 2014, the owner of Lahari Music Manohar Naidu confirmed that they purchased the audio rights of the film's soundtrack. In the end of May 2014, it was confirmed that the film's audio would be released on 9 August 2014 on the eve of Mahesh Babu's birthday. But in mid-July 2014, reports emerged that the audio may release either on the scheduled date or in mid-August 2014 and an official confirmation on these reports were awaited. Later, it was confirmed that the film's audio would be released on 31 August 2014 on the eve of Mahesh Babu's son Gautham Krishna Ghattamaneni's birthday.

However, there were reports which said that the film's soundtrack would release on 28 August 2014. Those reports were confirmed later in the third week of August 2014 and it was announced that the film's soundtrack would release on 29 August 2014, coinciding with Ganesh Chathurthi by hosting a grand promotional event at Shilpakala Vedika in Hyderabad with fans of Mahesh being given the importance. On 8 August 2014 the makers announced that the audio launch has been preponed to 15 August 2014. Shankar attended the film's audio launch as the chief guest along with Thaman. Mahesh attended the audio launch along with his wife Namrata Shirodkar and his parents Krishna and Vijaya Nirmala. The rest of the film's cast and crew except Tamannaah were present at the event. Later it was known that Tamannaah couldn't attend the film's audio launch because of the shoot of S. S. Rajamouli's Baahubali at Mahabaleshwar.

== Marketing ==
As a part of the promotions for the film's audio launch, a statewide contest named "Meelo Evaru Superstar SUPER SuperFan" was launched on 8 August 2014. A statement was issued regarding the same which stated the contest's process. A specially designed van would travel to six centers like Vishakhapatnam, Vijayawada, Khammam, Warangal, Tirupathi and Kurnool starting from 8 August to 10 August. It will station itself at colleges, malls and theaters and an anchor will ask questions about Mahesh and his films to the actor's fans assembled. Selected fans who give out the right answer would win a chance to play a specially designed game on Mahesh and his films on a computer inside the van. The best fan with the most right answers will be identified and shortlisted in each center. 12 people will be selected in this way and they would be invited to the audio launch and will be called onto the stage and a game will be played in the presence of Mahesh and the winner will be selected and be crowned by the Mahesh himself as the "Superstar SUPER Superfan" with a special gift.

It was also known that the audio launch event will be aired live on Gemini TV & Studio N and the audio launch & promotions are conceived, managed and marketed by Showtime Entertainments in association with 14 Reels Entertainment. It was reported that the audio promos of the songs in the soundtrack will be released on 14 August 2014. On that day, the audio release poster was released which also wished the people on the eve of Independence Day. The audio launch event was streamed online since 6:30 PM IST. The soundtrack disc was unveiled by Shankar who attended the event as the chief guest.

== Reception ==
The film's soundtrack received very good response from the audience within few hours of its release with a couple of songs turning into instant hits. Reviewing the soundtrack, The Times of India wrote "All in all, Thaman has come up with peppy and lively album that'll make music lovers groove to almost all the soundtracks." IndiaGlitz gave a review stating "From word go, Aagadu is all about the 'Feel of Thaman'. An album that is customized to reach out to the vast fan base of Mahesh Babu, a complaint one can have about the songs is that most of them sound like item songs religiously sung by item girls and boys." 123telugu.com gave a positive review stating "On the whole, Thaman does complete justice to his 50th album, and makes it a rocking score. Aagadu, Naari Naari and Bhel Puri are instant chart busters, and are our picks. The entire album is quite catchy and caters to every section of the audience. A sure shot winner, which will only add to the craze and success of the film." way2movies.com termed the soundtrack as a "perfect half century from Thaman" in their review. Milliblog termed the soundtrack a "Largely humdrum material" in their review.
