= Shruti Haasan =

Indian actress and singer (born 1986)

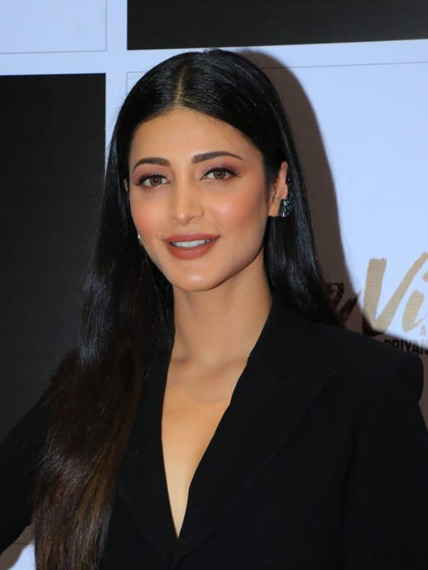
- Haasan in 2020
- Born: Shruti Rajalakshmi Haasan; 28 January 1986 (age 40); Madras, Tamil Nadu, India
- Education: St. Andrew's College, Mumbai
- Occupations: Actress; playback singer
- Years active: 2009–present
- Works: Full list
- Parents: Kamal Haasan (father); Sarika Thakur (mother)
- Family: See Haasan family
- Awards: Full list

Shruti Haasan (born 28 January 1986) is an Indian actress and singer who predominantly works in Telugu, Tamil and Hindi films. One of South India's highest-paid actresses, she has appeared in Forbes India's Celebrity 100 list of 2015 and 2016. Haasan is the recipient of various accolades, including two Filmfare Awards South and seven SIIMA Awards.

Born to actor-filmmaker Kamal Haasan and actress Sarika Thakur, she worked briefly as a child artist. She made her acting debut as an adult with the Hindi film Luck (2009). In 2011, she made her Telugu debut with Anaganaga O Dheerudu and Tamil debut with 7 Aum Arivu, winning the Filmfare Award for Best Female Debut – South for both these films. Following a career breakthrough with the Tamil film 3 (2012), Haasan established herself as a leading South Indian actress with the successful Telugu films Gabbar Singh (2012), Balupu (2013), Yevadu (2014), Race Gurram (2014), Srimanthudu (2015), Premam (2016), Krack (2021) and Waltair Veerayya (2023), earning the Filmfare Award for Best Actress – Telugu for Race Gurram.

Haasan has also played the leading lady in commercial successes—the Tamil films, Vedalam (2015) and Si3 (2017), and the Hindi films Gabbar Is Back (2015) and Welcome Back (2015). For her performance in D-Day (2013), she received a nomination for the IIFA Award for Best Supporting Actress. Her highest-grossing releases came with the Telugu film Salaar: Part 1 – Ceasefire (2023) and the Tamil film Coolie (2025).

In addition to her acting career, Haasan is also an established singer and has her own music band.

== Early life and family ==
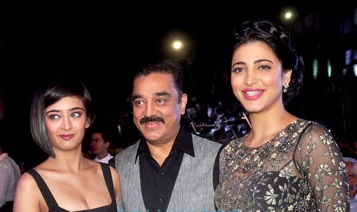
The Haasans: Akshara, Kamal and Shruti

Haasan was born on 28 January 1986 to actors Kamal Haasan and Sarika Thakur in Madras (now Chennai) into a Tamil family. Her father is a Tamilian Brahmin Iyengar, while her mother has Marathi and Rajput ancestry. Her parents married when she was one year old and got divorced in 2004. Haasan's younger sister Akshara Haasan, is also an actress. Actor and lawyer Charuhasan is her uncle. Actresses Suhasini Maniratnam and Anu Hasan are her cousins.

Haasan completed her schooling at Lady Andal school in Chennai and moved to Mumbai to obtain a degree in psychology at St. Andrew's College. Haasan focused on cinema and music, eventually traveling to the United States to study at the Musicians Institute in California, before returning to Chennai.

== Acting career ==
=== Debut and early career (2000–2011) ===
Haasan's first appearance in a feature film was as a child artist in a cameo role as the daughter of Vallabhbhai Patel in the Tamil-Hindi bilingual Hey Ram, based on a murder attempt on Mahatma Gandhi, directed by her father Kamal Haasan. After rejecting prominent film offers, most notably the lead role in Venkat Prabhu's Saroja, reports suggested in late 2007 that Haasan was set to make her actual acting debut in 2008 with a film opposite Madhavan, directed by Nishikant Kamat.

Haasan eventually signed up to feature in Soham Shah's Hindi film Luck, opposite Imran Khan, in July 2008, and shot for the film for nearly a year. Khan, her childhood friend, had recommended her name to the director and Haasan signed on after listening to the entire script and accepted to play a dual role in the action film. She took part in action scenes during filming and worked out extensively. The film opened in July 2009 to unanimously poor reviews from critics and took a poor opening at the box office, with critics stating that she "deserved a better launch vehicle". Reviewers were critical of her performance, with Rajeev Masand of IBN stating that she delivers "dialogues with deadpan expressions", while another critic added that she is perhaps "synthetic and fails to impress". Haasan then went on to appear alongside Blaaze in the promotional videos for Unnaipol Oruvan and Eenadu, the bilingual films starring her father, which she had composed the music for. She further made an appearance in a promotional music video for the horror film Hisss, starring Mallika Sherawat, where she had also sung a song composed by Dave Kushner.

Haasan made her Telugu debut in 2011, acting opposite Siddharth in the fantasy adventure film Anaganaga O Dheerudu, directed by Prakash Kovelamudi, son of director K. Raghavendra Rao. The film, co-produced by Walt Disney Pictures, saw her play a gypsy with magic healing powers defended by a swordsman, played by Siddharth. The film opened to positive reviews, with her performance being praised, with a critic of Sify noting: "Shruti looks quite attractive and makes a wonderful screen presence", while a reviewer from Rediff.com wrote that she "looks beautiful and has a mystical aura about her". It however became a box office average. Her second Hindi feature film, Madhur Bhandarkar's romantic comedy Dil Toh Baccha Hai Ji, saw her appear in an extended guest appearance alongside Emraan Hashmi. The film portrayed her as Nikki Narang, the step-daughter of an ex Miss India model, with Hashmi's character falling for both mother and daughter. Her performance gained poor responses from critics, with a reviewer citing that her character has been "reduced to post-interval surfacing, last-ditch glamour", while another labelled hers as "so fake that she offers only disappointment"; however, the film went on to become a commercial success at the box office.

In mid-2010, Haasan was signed by AR Murugadoss to star opposite Suriya in his next film 7 Aum Arivu, and the film's shooting began in June later that year. The director signed after he felt she looked the part of the scientist, mentioning that she seemed "intelligent and beautiful". She played Subha Srinivasan, a young scientist in the film, who hopes to re-activate the genes of 5th century Buddhist monk Bodhidharma, and her performance in the film won appreciation from critics. The film opened to mixed reviews, but became commercially successful. Malathi Rangarajan from The Hindu noted: "rarely is a heroine given near-equal footing in Tamil films", describing her as "ravishing but that she ought to work harder on spontaneity, and fine-tune her Tamil accent", but concluded "the point is the actor shows promise". Her next Telugu release was Oh My Friend, a romantic comedy film alongside Siddharth again, which also co-starred Hansika Motwani and Navdeep. The film told the story of childhood friends, and that of their platonic friendship that went on in their adulthood as well, and for the role Shruti Haasan went on to learn the dance of Kuchipudi. The film opened to average reviews, with several critics claiming the film evoked a sense of "déjà vu", though B. V. S. Prakash of Deccan Chronicle noted: "Shruti, on her part displays the same conviction." She won the Filmfare Award for Best Female Debut – South for Anaganaga O Dheerudu and 7 Aum Arivu and earned Filmfare Award for Best Actress – Tamil nomination for the latter.

=== Breakthrough (2012–2013) ===
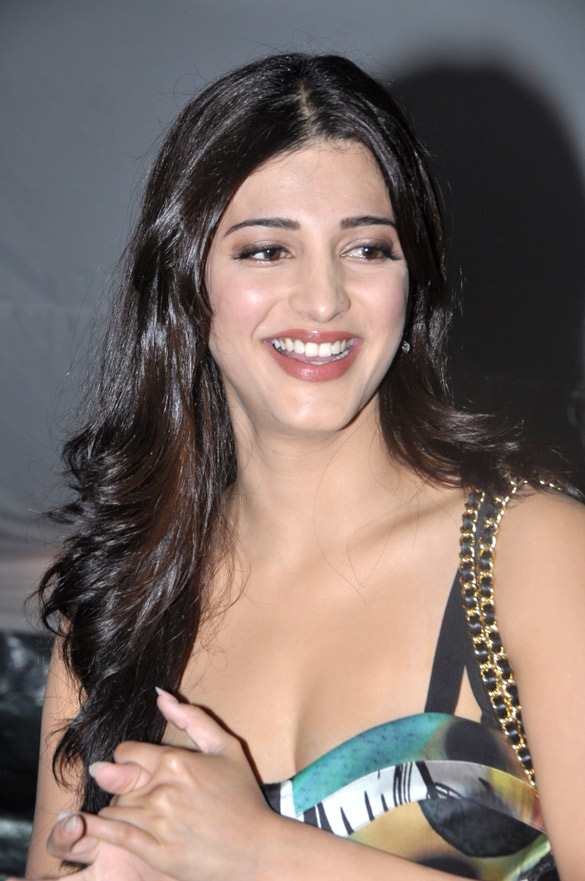
Haasan at a magazine launch in 2012

Aishwarya Rajinikanth's Tamil directorial debut 3, a romantic drama film co-starring Dhanush, marked a turning point in Haasan's career. Aishwarya revealed that she had written the script with Shruti in mind, but date problems meant that the film began its shoot with Amala Paul instead. However, in a turn of events, Shruti was re-signed to play the character of Janani, and the film gained much hype prior to release due to the collaboration of herself and Aishwarya, being the daughters of the two leading contemporary Tamil actors Kamal Haasan and Rajinikanth, respectively, as did the success of the song "Why This Kolaveri Di?". The film opened in March 2012 to positive reviews, with Vishnupriya Bhandaram of The Hindu noting: "Shruti Hassan has come a long way", while L Romal M Singh of DNA India stated that the first half of the film belongs to her. The film only garnered average returns at the box office and she received her second Filmfare Best Actress – Tamil nomination. Her second release in 2012 was Harish Shankar's Telugu film Gabbar Singh, a remake of the 2010 Hindi film Dabangg, featuring her opposite Pawan Kalyan. She played the role of Bhagyalakshmi, a village girl. The film went on to become a major commercial success at the box office and brought in more film offers for Haasan. Critics gave her performance a favourable verdict citing that she "justifies her role" and "though she didn't have much of a role, she has left her mark." Haasan won her first SIIMA Award for Best Actress – Telugu.

With four releases in 2013, Haasan first appeared in the Telugu film Balupu opposite, Ravi Teja, which eventually became a "super-hit", at the box office. She received positive reviews for her performance, with a critic of Idlebrain stating that she "provides the fun in the film with glamor and verve". Later that year, she starred in two Hindi films, Prabhu Deva's Ramaiya Vastavaiya and Nikkhil Advani's D-Day. For the former, she played a Punjabi girl Sona alongside Girish Kumar. In the latter, a spy thriller, she played Suraiya, a prostitute involved with a suspended army officer, Arjun Rampal. She also sang a song for the film, entitled "Alvida". Reviewing the film for Rediff.com, Palomi Sharma found Haasan to be "perfect as a Karachi prostitute with a haunting aura about her". In her final release that year, Haasan played a social worker Ammulu, opposite Jr. NTR, in Telugu film Ramayya Vasthavayya. The film received an average response from critics.

=== Commercial success and fluctuations (2014–2020) ===
Haasan's first release of 2014, the Telugu film Yevadu, opposite Ram Charan, emerged as a major commercial success. She played a college student Manju in the film. Karthik Pasupulate stated, "Shruti looks pretty, but has little else to do." In her second Telugu release of the year, Race Gurram, Haasan star opposite Allu Arjun for the first time in her career and played Spandana, an emotionless girl. The film emerged as a "blockbuster" success, the highest-grossing film of the year. She received positive reviews for her performance, with a critic of Deccan Chronicle noting that she "plays her part well and looks glamorous". For her performance, Haasan earned the Filmfare Award for Best Actress – Telugu and her second SIIMA Best Actress – Telugu. She also had a Tamil release; Poojai, opposite Vishal, for which she also did costume designing and performed her first item number, in the Telugu film Aagadu, starring Mahesh Babu and Tamannaah.

In 2015, Haasan performed her second item number in the Hindi film Tevar, featuring Arjun Kapoor and Sonakshi Sinha. She went onto appear in five successful films through the year. Haasan first played a lawyer Shruti, in the Hindi film Gabbar Is Back opposite Akshay Kumar, which was a commercial success. Srijana Mitra Das stated that she "charms" with her soft, pretty appeal. She next played a rural development student Charuseela in the Telugu film Srimanthudu opposite Mahesh Babu, which opened to positive critical reception and was a commercial success. A critic of The Hindu opined, "Shruti seems to be getting better with each film and does her part with grace and earnestness, managing to hold her own in a film that worships the hero." The film earned her third SIIMA Best Actress – Telugu alongside nomination for Filmfare Best Actress – Telugu. Hassan then appeared in Anees Bazmee's Hindi film Welcome Back, opposite John Abraham, playing Ranjana. Bollywood Hungama felt she played her part "decently". It was another box office success. She next appeared in two Tamil films. Haasan played Pavazhamalli in Puli, co-starring Vijay, which was a box office success. A critic of HuffPost felt Haasan "overshadowed" Vijay, with her "just competent presence". In Vedalam, opposite Ajith Kumar, she played a lawyer, Shwetha. The film emerged as a commercial success. Malini Mannath of The New Indian Express noted, "Shruti is adequate in the limited space given to her, but her character is sidelined when the sibling bonding makes its play."

In her first film of 2016, Haasan appeared in Rocky Handsome, opposite John Abraham for the second time. Renuka Vyavahare stated, "Shruti Haasan looks pretty in her special appearance, adding life to the lovely song Rehnuma." Haasan then played a Marathi-Tamil lecturer Sithara, in the Telugu film Premam, opposite Naga Chaitanya, a remake of the Malayalam film of the same name. A critic of Times of India stated: Shruti is graceful but seems to have done a wee bit lesser than her potential. Premam became a commercial success. Haasan played a journalist Vidya in the Tamil film Si3, her first release of 2017, where she reunited with Suriya. It was a box office success. In her next Telugu film, she played a village girl Avantika in Katamarayudu, which marked her second film with Pawan Kalyan. A remake of the Tamil film Veeram, it was a box office failure. Deepu Joseph of The Times of India noted, "Shruti looks beautiful and carries off her village belle avatar decently." In her final film of the year, she appeared in Behen Hogi Teri opposite Rajkummar Rao, playing a spunky girl, Binny. Rachit Gupta of Filmfare said, "Shruti Hassan looks beautiful as ever, but her role lets her down."

In 2018, Haasan hosted the Tamil talk show, Hello Sago, that premiered on Viu. She then made her American television debut with Treadstone, portraying Nira Patel. Following a three years of hiatus in Indian films, Hassan returned in 2020 with the short film Devi, where she played a rape victim, the film received critical acclaim. It depicts nine women forced into a sisterhood due to circumstance in which they are compelled to share their stories of abuse. Hindustan Times stated, "Shruti Haasan is a glam diva who sparingly speaks. She, Kajol and Neha Dhupia lead the spirited group of women." She followed it up with Yaara opposite Vidyut Jammwal, playing a politically active student. Later the year, she appeared in Amazon Prime's anthology film Putham Pudhu Kaalai, in which she appeared in the segment Coffee, anyone? Sowmya Rajendran of The News Minute stated that Haasan's role is brief but she does well with what she's been given.

=== Established actress (2021–present) ===
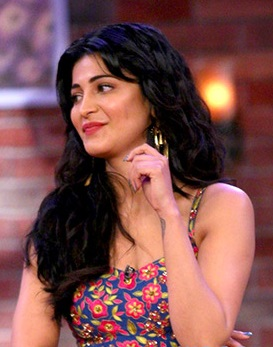
Haasan at an event

Haasan had five releases in the year 2021. She first appeared as Kalyani, in the Telugu film Krack, opposite Ravi Teja, reuniting after the 2013 film Balupu. It became a critical and commercial success at the box office. Janani K of India Today noted, "Though Shruti vanishes a few minutes into the film, she takes everyone by surprise with her act in the second half." She then reunited with Vidyut Jammwal in the Hindi film The Power. Haasan played a kitchen worker in the Telugu Netflix's anthology Pitta Kathalu in the segment xLife. Later that year, she played Pawan Kalyan's wife in the Telugu film Vakeel Saab, which was commercially successful. Haasan paired opposite Vijay Sethupathi in the Tamil film Laabam, her final release that year.

In 2022, Haasan made her Hindi web debut with Bestseller, alongside Mithun Chakraborty and Arjan Bajwa. She played Meenu, who aspires to be a writer. The series received mixed to negative reviews from critics. A critic of Times of India noted, "Shruti Haasan de-glams for Meetu Mathur and after a few initial moments of discomfort in front of the camera, her act picks up pace."

Haasan played a singer Esha, opposite Nandamuri Balakrishna in Veera Simha Reddy, her first release of 2023. Neeshita Nyayapati of Times of India found that Haasan was reduced to exists only to shake a leg. Next, she played RAW Agent Athidhi, opposite Chiranjeevi in Waltair Veerayya. Ram Venkat Srikar of Cinema Express stated, "Shruti gets a fine role, packed with a surprise." Both these films turned out to be among the highest grossing Telugu films of the year. After appearing in a song in Hi Nanna, Hassan played an NRI Aadhya opposite Prabhas in Salaar: Part 1 – Ceasefire. Paul Nicodemus of Times of India opined, "Shruti Haasan, in her role as Aadhya, brings a sense of balance but is mostly limited to the first half and a few scenes in the second." A commercial success, it became the highest grossing Telugu film of the year and one of the highest grossing Telugu film of all time. That same year, Haasan expanded to English films with The Eye opposite Mark Rowley, where she played Diana who goes to length to save her lover. The film was premiered in India in 2025.

In her only release of 2025, Haasan played Preethi, a daughter investigating her father's death in Coolie alongside Rajnikanth. Janani K found it to be "one of her most impactful performances". Hindustan Times's Abhimanyu Mathur stated, "Shruti has done well with the role she has, even matching Rajini in certain confrontational scenes." The film emerged a commercial success and the fourth highest-grossing Tamil film of all time. She will next appear in the Tamil film Train opposite Vijay Sethupathi, and in the Telugu film Salaar Part 2: Shouryanga Parvam opposite Prabhas.

== Music career ==
In addition to acting, Haasan is also an established singer. She has received nominations for the Filmfare Award for Best Female Playback Singer – Tamil for singing "Kannazhaga Kaalazhaga" in 3 (2012) and "Yendi Yendi" in Puli (2015); and the Filmfare Award for Best Female Playback Singer – Telugu for "Junction Lo" in Aagadu (2014). She has also sung songs in Hindi films including "Aazma (Luck Is The Key)" for Luck, "Alvida" for D-Day and "Joganiyan" for Tevar.

Haasan began her career as a music director with her father's production Unnaipol Oruvan (2009) and has since formed her own music band. She won the Best Music Director award for Unnaipol Oruvan at Edison Awards. Screen India said that she "has the makings of a good singer, and with some training she should go great guns."

Haasan's notable songs include: "Adiye Kolluthe" from Vaaranam Aayiram (2008), "Yellae Lama" from 7 Aum Arivu (2011), "Down Down" from Race Gurram (2014), "Don't You Mess With Me" from Vedalam (2015), "Odiyamma" from Hi Nanna (2023) and "It's a Break Up Da" from Kadhalikka Neramillai (2025). In 2025, she also performed a song "Vinveli Nayaga", in her father's film Thug Life. The song won her the SIIMA Award for Best Female Playback Singer - Tamil.

== Personal life and other work ==
Haasan dated London-based actor Michael Corsale, of Italian descent, with whom she broke up in 2019. From 2020 to 2024, Haasan was in a relationship with visual artist, Santanu Hazarika.

Haasan is associated with a lot of social causes. She has been associated with the RPG Foundation, an NGO committed to women's empowerment. She was a part of Julio Ribeiro campaign for Jammu and Kashmir floods of 2014, where she donated a large sum for the cause. For Bal Asha Trust, Mumbai, she organized an online clothes sale and promoted circular fashion. In 2019, she attended a painting exhibition, to raise funds for children of Bai Jerbai Wadia Hospital for Children. In 2014, she lent her voice for a digital campaign called TeachAIDS to spread AIDS awareness.

Haasan made her Cannes Film Festival appearance in 2017, where she also graced the red carpet for British author Neil Gaiman. She has ramp walked at the Lakme Fashion Week and has been cover model for various magazines. Haasan has performed at various film awards and other events. She has done music gigs in London. She was signed as the brand ambassador for WWF India. Haasan also conducted an online session on social topics such as mental health, women in films and media, and sustainability in fashion.

== Artistry and public image ==
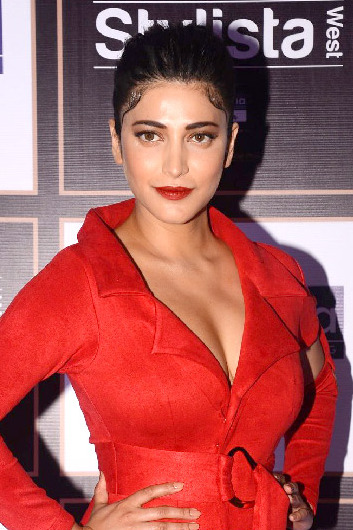
Haasan at an event in 2017

Haasan is considered among the most popular actors of Telugu cinema. She is one of the highest paid actresses in South Indian cinema, according to various media reports. Haasan has appeared in Forbes India's Celebrity 100 list. She debuted at 61st position with an estimated annual income of ₹80.0 million (US$850,000). In 2016, with an estimated annual income of ₹69.0 million (US$740,000), she peaked at 46th position. Haasan is among the highest-grossing actresses in Indian cinema.

With her debut films Anaganaga O Dheerudu and 7 Aum Arivu, critics stated that, "she shows promise.". Her career marked a turning point with 3. She went onto achieve praises for her portrayals in mainstream Telugu and Tamil films, in particular for Oh My Friend, Race Gurram, Srimanthudu, Premam and Si3. She has been termed, "fine performer", "graceful", "revelation" and "gorgeous" for her performances in these films. She has often been cast opposite the same actors more than once, featuring in two or more films with Pawan Kalyan, Suriya, Ravi Teja and Siddharth. She even proved to be the "lucky charm", for some of them. Suresh Krishnamoorthy of The Hindu find her to be "down-to-earth and someone who conceals her not-so-ok Telugu with a dazzling smile". Manjusha Radhakrishnan of Gulf News noted, "Haasan is one of the rare talents who don't take the star part of the celebrity too seriously." GQ India finds Haasan to be "a talented actress, a gifted singer and one helluva looker". While praising her music skills, Verve termed her a "multifaceted artiste".

Haasan was placed first in Rediff.com's "Top Tamil Actresses" list. She was also placed 4th in its "Hottest South Indian actresses" list. She stood at the 24th place on Forbes India's most influential stars on Instagram in South cinema for the year 2021. Haasan has frequently featured on Hyderabad Times Most Desirable Woman and Chennai Times Most Desirable Woman list. She became Hyderabad's Most Desirable Woman in 2013 and 2020 and Chennai's Most Desirable Woman in 2013. She is a celebrity endorser for brands and products such as Lloyd, Emami Navratna Talc, Fossil watches, and Kalamandir Jewellers. As of 2025, she is one of the most-followed Telugu actresses on Instagram. In 2024, she was placed 58th on IMDb's List of 100 Most Viewed Indian Stars.

== Accolades ==
Haasan has received two Filmfare Awards South among five nominations: Best Female Debut – South for 7 Aum Arivu & Anaganaga O Dheerudu and Best Actress – Telugu for Race Gurram.

== See also ==
- List of Indian film actresses
