= The Dark (TV series) =

British television series

- Genre: Crime drama
- Based on: From the Shadows by GR Halliday
- Screenplay by: Matt Hartley; Lena Rae; Nessah Muthy
- Directed by: Gilles Bannier
- Starring: Laura Donnelly; Mark Rowley; Emun Elliott; Helen Baxendale
- Country of origin: United Kingdom
- Original language: English
- No. of series: 1
- No. of episodes: 6

Production
- Executive producers: Ben Stephenson; Preethi Mavahalli; Luke Woellhaf; Fern McCauley; Matt Hartley
- Producer: Matt Brown
- Cinematography: Joel Honeywell
- Production company: Poison Pen

Original release
- Network: ITV1; STV
- Release: 12 July – 27 July 2026

The Dark is a six-part ITV1 crime drama television series, adapted from the novel From the Shadows by GR Halliday. It aired on 12 July 2026. The cast is led by Laura Donnelly, Mark Rowley, Emun Elliott and Helen Baxendale.

== Premise ==
A detective investigates after the body of young man is found staged in a peculiar fashion in the Scottish wilderness.

== Cast ==
- Laura Donnelly as Detective Monica Kennedy
- Mark Rowley as DC Conor Crawford
- Emun Elliott as Barclay Adams
- Helen Baxendale as Bethany Morgan
- Rona Morison as Philly
- Cal MacAninch as Stephen Wright
- Stella Gonet as Angela Kennedy
- Tunji Kasim as Michael Bach
- Catherine McCormack as Gloria MacLennan
- Jatinder Singh Randhawa as DC Ewan Dhillon
- Phil McKee as Don Cameron
- Brian Ferguson as Kyle Ward
- Emily Mac as Tammy Ward
- Liam King as Scott MacKay
- Jack Hesketh as Owen MacLennan
- Tamsin Jordan as Lucy Kennedy
- Aaron McVeigh as Rob Wright
- Anders Hayward as James Brooke
- Ian Pirie as PD Duncan Gregg
- Lois Chimimba as PC Carol Stewart
- Jim Kitson as Muir Maitland
- Charlie Geany as Sandy Allen
- Nicholas Nunn as Nichol Morgan
- Hayat Kamille as Dr Hana Hadid

== Episodes ==
No.	Title	Directed by	Written by	Original release date	U.K. viewers (millions)
1	"Episode 1"	Gilles Bannier	Matt Hartley & Nessah Muthy	12 July 2026	1.37
2	"Episode 2"	Gilles Bannier	Unknown	13 July 2026	2.65
3	"Episode 3"	Gilles Bannier	Unknown	20 July 2026	2.94
4	"Episode 4"	Gilles Bannier	Unknown	21 July 2026	2.77
5	"Episode 5"	Gilles Bannier	Unknown	26 July 2026	2.74
6	"Episode 6"	Gilles Bannier	Unknown	27 July 2026	2.87

== Production ==
The series was commissioned by ITVX in July 2025, and is adapted from the GR Halliday 2020 novel From the Shadows, with the adaptation by Matt Hartley, Lena Rae and Nessah Muthy, with Gilles Bannier as director. The series is executive produced by Ben Stephenson for Poison Pen alongside Preethi Mavahalli, Luke Woellhaf and Fern McCauley and Hartley. Matt Brown is series producer.

The cast is led by Mark Rowley and Laura Donnelly and also includes Emun Elliott, Helen Baxendale, Rona Morison, Cal MacAninch, Stella Gonet, Phil McKee, Tunji Kasim and Catherine McCormack.

Filming began in Glasgow, Scotland, in September 2025. Filming also took place in Greenock that month.

== Broadcast ==
The Dark was broadcast on ITV and ITVX from 12 July 2026.

== Reception ==
Lucy Mangan in The Guardian noted the gothic tone of the series and praised the performance of Donnelly in the lead role, which along with the "style and confidence" of the series, "marks it out from the formulaic ITV herd". Mangan criticised some forced and awkward plot devices. James Jackson in The Times described the series as having the feel of a horror film, with a "grimly intense" performance by Donnelly, and a terrifying climax to the first episode, but noted a dryness and lack of wit within the dialogue. Anita Singh in The Daily Telegraph said that series is more "horror than police procedural" with the title being "a warning for viewers, to be taken both figuratively and literally" with a creepy tone "not for those of a nervous disposition", and a plot that could have been streamlined producing "long periods in between the shocking moments and cliffhanger endings that feel painfully slow and disjointed".
