= Oh My Friend =

- Film Poster
- Directed by: Venu Sriram
- Written by: Venu Sriram
- Produced by: Dil Raju
- Starring: Siddharth; Shruti Haasan; Hansika; Navdeep
- Cinematography: Vijay K. Chakravarthy
- Edited by: Marthand K. Venkatesh
- Music by: Rahul Raj (songs); Mani Sharma (score)
- Production company: Sri Venkateswara Creations
- Distributed by: Geetha Arts
- Release date: 11 November 2011
- Running time: 131 minutes
- Country: India
- Language: Telugu

Oh My Friend is a 2011 Telugu-language romantic drama film written and directed by Venu Sriram in his directorial debut and produced by Dil Raju under Sri Venkateswara Creations. The film stars Siddharth, Shruti Haasan, Hansika and Navdeep.

Principal photography began in February 2011 and continued till late-October, with filming held in Hyderabad, Visakhapatnam, Alappuzha and Mumbai. The cinematography was handled by Vijay K. Chakravarthy and edited by Marthand K. Venkatesh. The soundtrack was composed by Rahul Raj and background score was composed by Mani Sharma. Oh My Friend was distributed by Geetha Arts and released on 11 November 2011.

== Plot ==
Chandu and Siri are childhood friends, affectionately calling each other "Faltoos" and "Killer", respectively. Their friendship remains intact as they grow up. Chandu was sent to Mumbai to do an MBA, but learned music instead and returned to the agony of his father. Siri convinces Chandu's father that it is her responsibility to take care of Chandu's career. They go for an audition where they get into a fight with a band and he is sent out. Before that, Siri accepts a love proposal from Uday, who lives in the US, after consulting Chandu. Later, Chandu and Siri accidentally meet their mutual friend in college, Ritu Sharma, and Chandu falls in love with her at first sight. Chandu starts spending time with Ritu to impress her, but Siri feels that she is being avoided. Siri decides to leave for a dancing school in Chennai. Meanwhile, Ritu accepts Chandu's love proposal. When Siri is about to leave, Chandu apologises to her that he has not noticed that she is being avoided. At the same time, Uday comes back from the US to surprise her. Hence, she decides not to leave.

Chandu decides to attend the Airtel music competition in Kochi as a lead guitarist in a band. Siri, Uday, and Ritu accompany him there. They stay in a hotel, where Clarity Kanna Rao is the servant. Chandu gets his practice through the band which he fought but they later become friends. Chandu wins the competition with a guitar given by Siri. However, the events in Kochi display a deep friendship between Chandu and Siri attracting the jealousy of both Ritu and Uday. Finally, Uday calls for a breakup by asking to decide between him and Chandu. Chandu's father defends Uday's opinion and asks Chandu and Siri to realise their love. But, Chandu insists that their friendship cannot be turned into love and tells Uday to marry Siri, promising him that he will not be in touch, see her and talk to her ever. The movie ends with Siri giving birth to Uday's child, while Chandu and Ritu, now a married couple, come to see them at the hospital.

At the hospital, Uday realizes his mistake of separating them and asks Chandu and Siri to become friends again. They both reunite. The four friends leave with Siri and Uday's baby in Chandu's car.

== Cast ==
- Siddharth as Chandrakiran / Chandu "Faltoos", Siri's childhood best friend
- Shruti Haasan as Siri Chandana "Killer", Chandu's childhood best friend
- Hansika as Ritu Sharma, Chandu and Siri's old college mate and Chandu's love interest, later wife
- Navdeep as Uday, Siri's love interest, later husband
- Tanikella Bharani as Chandu's father
- Lakshmi Ramakrishnan as Chandu's mother
- Vinaya Prasad as Siri's mother
- Ali as Clarity Kanna Rao
- Raghu Babu as Lahari Resort Worker
- Sivannarayana Naripeddi as Chandu's father's coworker

== Production ==
Venu Sriram worked as an assistant director to Sukumar during the production of Arya (2004), through which he came into contact with the producer Dil Raju. He initially narrated a story to the latter, which would star Prabhas, but Raju was not satisfied with the treatment of the storyline. Afterwards, Raju insisted him to assist debutant Srikanth Addala on Kotha Bangaru Lokam (2008). During that film's production, Venu wrote the initial draft for Oh My Friend which Dil Raju found it interesting and had asked him to develop the complete script within six months. Venu eventually discussed with other fellow directors from their banner, who had provided their inputs and suggestions, and completed the script within the stipulated time frame. After a one-hour narration, Raju approved the script.

Initially, Raju narrated the script to M. S. Raju as he wanted to launch his son Sumanth as a lead actor, but the latter had committed for another film. He then discussed it to Siddharth, who accepted the offer after liking the script. The film marked Siddharth's reunion with Dil Raju after he previously starred in their production, Bommarillu (2006). However, Raju felt that he had to cast three more actors with star potential as Siddharth being a popular face in Telugu cinema. Amala Paul was initially considered for the female lead. However, the producers were hesitant as she was not a popular face that time. Amrita Rao was roped in for the project in her Telugu debut, but opted out, shortly thereafter. Later, Nithya Menen was cast in for the female lead role. However, she was subsequently replaced by Shruti Haasan; having previously acted with Siddharth in Anaganaga O Dheerudu. Hansika was cast as the second female lead. Raju further narrated the film to 5–6 other actors for the parallel lead, who denied the role as they do not get equal exposure. Navdeep eventually accepted the role. Initially Mickey J. Meyer was considered to compose the film's music, before the team roped in Malayalam film composer Rahul Raj in his Telugu debut.

A puja ceremony was held at the office of Sri Venkateswara Creations on 9 February 2011. Filming began on 21 February 2011 at Hyderabad. The initial cinematographer left the project due to schedule conflicts and Vijay K. Chakravarthy joined the film as a cinematographer. Shooting took place in various locations in Hyderabad and Visakhapatnam, with a portion of the film being shot in Alappuzha. A song was filmed at the Mumbai–Pune Expressway with all the lead actors during late October 2011. The film in its entirety was completed within 84 working days. During post-production, Mani Sharma joined the project to compose the background score.

== Soundtrack ==
The soundtrack features seven songs: one song "Sri Chaitanya" was composed by the late Anil R. while the remainder of the album were composed by Rahul Raj. Krishna Chaitanya and Sirivennela Seetharama Sastry wrote lyrics for the songs. The album, distributed by Aditya Music, was released on 15 October 2011 at Shilpakala Vedika in Hyderabad, and achieved record sales upon release.

== Release ==
Oh My Friend was theatrically released on 11 November 2011 along with the Madhura Sreedhar Reddy-directed It's My Love Story. The film released in 250 prints with Raju distributing the film under Nizam and Visakhapatnam regions, while other territories were sold to the company's norm distributors. The overseas distribution rights were acquired by BlueSky Cinemas which released the film on a profit-sharing basis. The film's premiere was held on 10 November, at Cinemax in Hyderabad, with home minister Sabitha Indra Reddy and cinematography minister D. K. Aruna attending the premiere with actors Allu Arjun, Ram Pothineni, Genelia D'Souza, Rana Daggubati, Sridevi Vijaykumar, producers Allu Aravind, Gemini Kiran, Bandla Ganesh, Bellamkonda Suresh and directors Sukumar and Dasaradh.

The film was dubbed in Tamil under the title Sridhar and was released on 18 May 2012. Sivakarthikeyan dubbed for Siddharth's portions in the Tamil version, after Siddharth refused to dub his own voice. Owing to the success of Siddharth's Kadhalil Sodhappuvadhu Yeppadi and Hansika's Oru Kal Oru Kannadi, the film was released in 200 theatres across Tamil Nadu.

== Reception ==
Radhika Rajamani from Rediff.com called it as a "feel-good entertainer with its youthful theme" and complimented that "the film works because of the performances of Siddharth and Shruti. They complement each other perfectly and both turn in good performances." Jeevi of Idlebrain.com summarized "Oh My Friend is a kind of film which you either connect or disconnet. It will be liked by the viewers who gets connected. The publicity and package of the film is very good and it has generated excellent openings. We have to wait and see how youth and family crowds like the movie." Y. Sunita Chowdary of The Hindu stated "the film has a good visual appeal and is embellished with fine performances."

NDTV wrote "Oh! My Friend can best be described a simple story of love and friendship. And while the director succeeds in portraying this in an effective manner, what is missing is a creative approach to the subject." Critic based at The New Indian Express called the film "watchable" but criticized the narration and the screenplay being "too stale and predictable"; the reviewer compared the film to Chiranjeevi's Iddaru Mitrulu (1999) and Venkatesh's Vasantam (2003). Another critic from Bangalore Mirror also opined on the screenplay being predictable, but complimented Siddharth and Shruti's performances, the latter being a "surprise package [...] who adds zing to her character"; the critic compared the chemistry of the two lead actors to that of Shahid Kapoor and Kareena Kapoor's chemistry and banter in Jab We Met (2007).

In contrast, The Times of India wrote "everything from the cinematography to the dialogues are just routine. The director hasn’t come up with a single innovative element in this hackneyed story." B. V. S. Prakash of Deccan Chronicle summarized "the whole theme is brought down by a dreary screenplay and too many repetitive scenes. However, the bold resolution of the two turns out to be the USP of the romantic entertainer". Sify wrote "One plus point of the film is that it is completely free from vulgarity, but at the same time the documentary type of treatment to the sentimental aspects of love and friendship led to boredom, testing the patience of the audiences. The movie might catch up with the youth addicted to the multiplexes, and it is very difficult for the general crowds to bear with."
