= Gabbar Is Back =

2015 Hindi film directed by Krish

- Theatrical release poster
- Directed by: Krish Jagarlamudi
- Written by: Rajat Arora
- Story by: A. R. Murugadoss
- Based on: Ramanaa by A. R. Murugadoss
- Produced by: Sanjay Leela Bhansali; Viacom 18 Motion Pictures
- Starring: Akshay Kumar; Kareena Kapoor; Shruti Haasan
- Cinematography: Nirav Shah
- Edited by: Rajesh G. Pandey
- Music by: Songs: Chirantan Bhatt; Yo Yo Honey Singh; Manj Musik; Background Score: Amar Mohile
- Production companies: Viacom18 Motion Pictures; Bhansali Productions
- Distributed by: Panorama Studios (India); Eros International (Overseas)
- Release date: 1 May 2015
- Running time: 121 minutes
- Country: India
- Language: Hindi
- Budget: ₹79 crore
- Box office: ₹135.81 crore

Gabbar Is Back is a 2015 Indian Hindi-language vigilante action thriller film directed by Krish in his Hindi debut, written by Rajat Arora and produced by Sanjay Leela Bhansali. The film stars Akshay Kumar and Shruti Haasan with Kareena Kapoor Khan in a special appearance.

An official remake of A. R. Murugadoss's 2002 Tamil film Ramanaa, it is named after the titular antagonist played by Amjad Khan in the 1975 film Sholay. The film was released theatrically on 1 May 2015 and became a critical and commercial success.

== Plot ==
The police get information that 10 tehsildars across Maharashtra have been mysteriously kidnapped. However, no sooner are they mysteriously returned – except the most corrupt officer, who is hanged. The police get a CD from mystery man 'Gabbar', who says his mission is to target corrupt officers. Police driver Sadhuram is convinced he can crack the mystery of who is Gabbar.

National College professor Aditya thrashes some goons who try to vandalize college property. On his way home one night, he encounters a young lawyer, Shruti, who is in a hurry to take a pregnant woman to the hospital. Some days later, she bumps into Aditya again during a fight, and they begin dating. Sadhuram in the meantime finds out there's one honest officer in each department across the state, and is convinced that each of these honest officers has a link to Gabbar.

One fateful day, Aditya and Shruti are checking out of a roadside café when Shruti is hurt in a minor accident, and Aditya takes her to the Patil Hospital where a female doctor insists on taking a number of expensive tests. Aditya happens to overhear a doctor try to suggest the rather expensive Caesarean section delivery and is soon convinced of the hospital staff's dirty tricks when he notices a father-daughter duo being informed of the mother's death only after an expensive bill was paid. He deliberately checks in a poor woman's dead husband as a patient; unaware of his trap, the hospital tries to swindle money out of Aditya by pretending to treat the already dead man, making him pay heavily for tests and medicines. However, Aditya shows them the death certificate as a proof of their knowingly admitting a dead man. The young owner of the hospital, Vikas Patil, is furious when Aditya releases the video of the hospital's corruption to the media despite having struck a deal with him. Vikas is murdered by the enraged public, and his father Digvijay Patil sees Aditya in the hospital CCTV footage, only to realize this is the same man he had supposedly killed five years ago.

A flashback soon reveals that Aditya's pregnant wife Sunaina died when the buildings in their colony collapsed and killed hundreds of other people too. Aditya collected proof of the faulty buildings against builder Digvijay, who bribed everyone and tried to bribe Aditya too by offering Rs. 10 million to spare the matter, but Aditya spurned the offer by fighting everyone in the room and nearly killing Digvijay. Aditya spared him when the latter asked for forgiveness, but Digvijay brutally retaliated by hitting him with an axe and left him for dead. However, a bus full of medical students found the unconscious Aditya on a highway and saved his life. He then decided to use the power of idealistic, young, honest youths and trained students at National College to join his cause. Meanwhile, Sadhuram finds that all the honest officers attended National College for graduation. Shruti discovers that Aditya is the real Gabbar and is shocked but when he tells her the truth, she supports his cause.

CBI officer Kuldeep Pahwa takes charge of the case and is mystified by the facts. He listens to Sadhuram's findings, and they arrest the National College students listed by Sadhuram, but upon being beaten, the students do not divulge anything about Gabbar, which enrages him further. Shruti tells Kuldeep that because the law doesn't work, a vigilante like Gabbar has become a hero for ordinary citizens. Sadhuram changes his view of Gabbar. Digvijay kills an honest officer to terrorize others into passing his faulty building plans. Gabbar targets Digvijay for his act. Digvijay throws a birthday party for himself, and as he cuts the cake, he spots Aditya. Aditya and his gang kidnap him. As police search the city for Digvijay in vain, whereas Aditya hides Patil in his own house. Aditya kills Digvijay in a fight that ensues between the two, following which he surrenders himself to the police and is eventually given a death penalty, sparking huge public protests and enraged students block his jail van. Kuldeep requests him to speak to the students and he does, telling them to channel their anger against corruption and be the change society needs. Finally, while being prepared to be hanged, Aditya remarks that he will die but the movement will live on.

== Cast ==
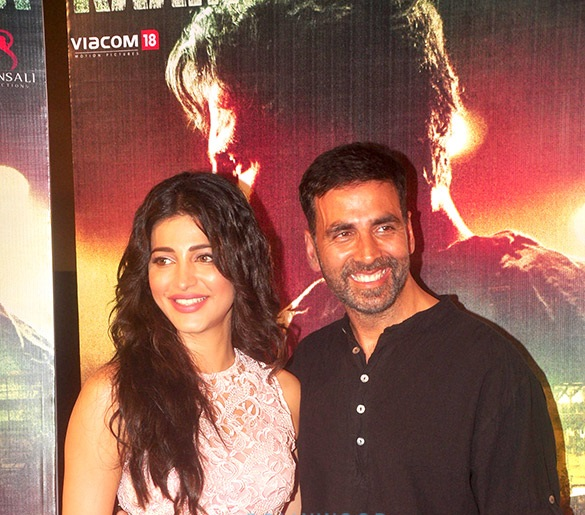
Shruti Haasan and Akshay Kumar during the film's trailer launch.

- Akshay Kumar as Professor Aditya Singh Rajput alias "Gabbar"
- Kareena Kapoor Khan as Sunaina Singh Rajput, Aditya's late wife (cameo appearance)
- Shruti Haasan as Advocate Shruti, Aditya's girlfriend
- Suman Talwar as Digvijay Patil (voice dubbed by Mayur Vyas)
- Gaurav Kaushal as Gaurav
- Sunil Grover as Constable Sadhuram
- Jaideep Ahlawat as CBI officer Kuldeep Pahwa
- Ishita Vyas as Veena
- Raj Singh Arora as Govind Gawde
- Shruti Bapna as Lakshmi
- Ravi Prakash as Ravi
- Manoj Chandila as Vikas Patil, Digvijay's son
- Vikas Shrivastav as Inspector Vikas
- Saanvi Talwar as Reporter
- Fareed Ahmed as Parvesh
- Anuradha Chandan as Govind's mother
- Siddhant Ghegadmal as Student
- Jehangir R Karkaria as Comic Doctor of Patil Hospital
- Narendra Jetly as Senior Doctor
- Afreen as Isha Dutta
- Sai Ballal as Chandrakant Gawde
- Jagdish Rajpurohit as Sub Inspector Yadav
- Shivraj Walwekar as Police Commissioner Ashok Pant
- Rajeev Kacho as Vishwas Sawant
- Anandeshwar Dwivedi as Newsreader
- Uttam Haldar as Ward boy
- Krishna Raaz as Shanti Nagpal
- Prateek Srivastava as Hari
- Boloram Das as peon
- Chandraprakash Thakur as Thakur
- Pradeep Shukla as Home Minister
- Kumud Shaw as Dr Kumud
- Jitendra Trehan as Dr Manoj Verma
- Deepak Dhadwal as Principal, National College
- Ruby Parihar as Varsha
- Chitrangada Singh in a special appearance in an item song "Aao Raja"

== Soundtrack ==
Gabbar Is Back

Soundtrack album by: Chirantan Bhatt; Yo Yo Honey Singh; Manj Musik
- Released: 20 April 2015
- Genre: Feature film soundtrack
- Length: 16:02
- Label: Zee Music Company

The songs of Gabbar Is Back were composed by Chirantan Bhatt, Yo Yo Honey Singh and Manj Musik, while the lyrics were written by Manoj Yadav, Kumaar, Sahil Kaushal, Manj Musik, Raftaar and Big Dhillon.

No.	Title	Lyrics	Music	Singers	Length
1.	"Teri Meri Kahaani"	Manoj Yadav	Chirantan Bhatt	Arijit Singh, Palak Muchhal	5:31
2.	"Coffee Peetey Peetey"	Kumaar	Chirantan Bhatt	Dev Negi, Paroma Das Gupta	3:38
3.	"Aao Raja"	Lil Golu , Yo Yo Honey Singh	Yo Yo Honey Singh	Neha Kakkar, Yo Yo Honey Singh, Teflon	4:01
4.	"Warna Gabbar Aa Jayega"	Manj Musik, Raftaar , Big Dhillon	Manj Musik	Manj Musik, Raftaar	2:52
Total length:					16:02

== Critical response ==
On the review aggregator website Rotten Tomatoes, 18% of 11 critics' reviews are positive, with an average rating of 4/10.

Bollywood Hungama rated the film 3 stars out of 5, writing that "On the whole, Gabbar Is Back is an average entertainer which will draw huge footfalls over the weekend due to catchy massy title, action drama and the fact that it is releasing on a holiday." Hindustan Times rated it 3 stars out of 5, stating that "Gabbar Is Back is a full on ‘masala’ film with a lot of applause worthy scenes. The buck stops at Akshay Kumar." The Times of India rated the film 3.5 stars out of 5, writing that "Now, Gabbar Is Back – and you'll feel his return rocks." Zee News also rated it 3.5 stars out of 5, writing that "After watching this we surely need a real 'Gabbar' to blow some courage in all of us—and wipe out corruption from the root. 'Pachaas Pachaas Kos Dur Jabh Koi Rishwat Leta Hai, Toh Sabh Kehte Hain Mat Le Varna, Gabbar Aa Jaaega." Subhash K. Jha of Bollywood Hungama wrote that "Akshay Gives The Super-Hero A New Definition." Hindustan Times audio news praised the screen presence of Akshay Kumar. Deccan Chronicle described the movie as "cliched but enjoyable in bits". Business Standard posted the ratings of IANS which gave 4 stars to the movie.

== Box office ==
Gabbar is Back grossed ₹1.35 billion (equivalent to ₹2.0 billion or US$21 million in 2023) world-wide.
