= The Eye (2023 film) =

2023 British psychological thriller film by Daphne Schmon

- Official poster
- Directed by: Daphne Schmon
- Screenplay by: Emily Carlton
- Produced by: Melanie Dicks
- Starring: Shruti Haasan; Mark Rowley
- Cinematography: James Chegwyn
- Edited by: Yannis Chalkiadakis
- Music by: David Schweitzer
- Production companies: Argonauts Productions; Fingerprint Content
- Release date: 12 October 2023 (London Independent Film Festival)
- Running time: 93 minutes
- Country: United Kingdom
- Language: English

The Eye is a 2023 British psychological thriller film directed by Daphne Schmon and starring Shruti Haasan and Mark Rowley. The film screened at the London Independent Film Festival on 12 October 2023 and the Greek International Film Festival.

== Plot ==
Diana goes to the island where Felix drowned to immerse his ashes in the sea. While helping in the slaughter of a lamb, she learns of the Evil Eye, which can bring back Felix if she kills someone else. She accepts the offer and puts a young boy's life in danger. How far Diana will go to bring back Felix forms the rest of the story.

== Cast ==
- Shruti Haasan as Diana
- Mark Rowley as Felix

Anna Savva, Linda Marlowe and Christos Stergioglou were cast in undisclosed roles.

== Production ==
"Working on The Eye has been incredibly special, and it entered my life at the exact moment it was supposed to. Working with an entirely female-led team for the first time has been beyond magical. As an artist who has always loved collaborating, being part of this creative sisterhood has been a powerful experience. The storytelling is truly unique, and I take great pride in being a part of it".

— Haasan on the film at Cannes, 2023

The film was reportedly shot in Athens and Corfu in late October 2022.

== Nominations ==
Award (Note: Awards, festivals and organizations are in alphabetical order.)	Date of ceremony (Note: Date is linked to the article about the awards held that year, wherever possible.)	Category	Recipient(s)	Result	Ref.
Greek International Film Festival	October 2023	Best Director	Daphne Schon	Nominated	
Greek International Film Festival	October 2023	Best Cinematography	James Chegwyn	Nominated	
London Independent Film Festival	October 2023	Best Film	The Eye	Nominated	
