= Mark Rowley (actor) =

Scottish actor (born 1990)

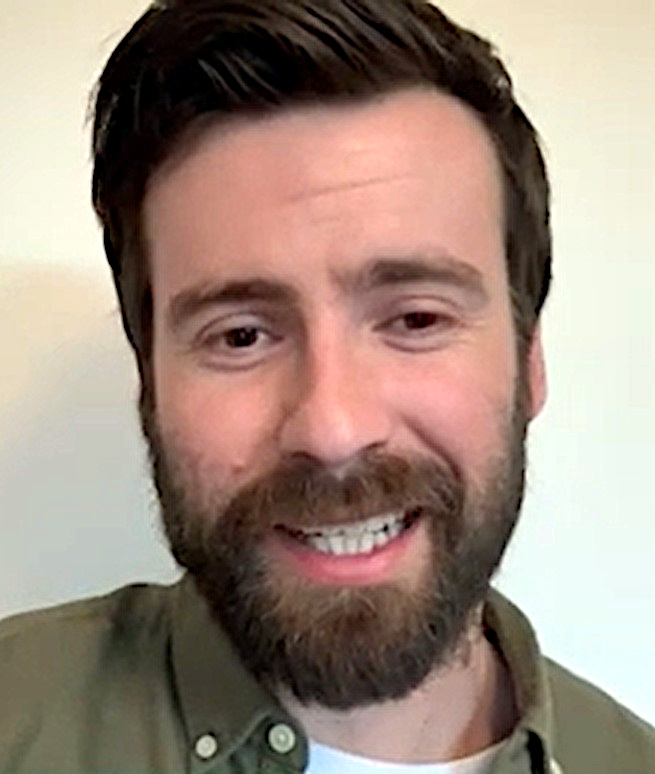
- Rowley in 2023
- Born: 29 January 1990 (age 36); Paisley, Renfrewshire, Scotland
- Occupation: Actor
- Years active: 2011–present

Mark Rowley (born 29 January 1990) is a Scottish actor, who has appeared in the television series River City (2013–2014), Young Dracula (2014), Home Fires (2016), The North Water and The Spanish Princess (2020). He played the Irish warrior Finan, Uhtred's second in command in battle, in The Last Kingdom (2017–2022), and was Prince Alvitirin in The Witcher: Blood Origin (2022).

== Early life and career ==
Mark Rowley is from Paisley, Scotland. His interest in acting grew after attending classes at the PACE Theatre Company in Paisley. In 2013, Rowley graduated from the Glasgow based Royal Conservatoire of Scotland.

From 2013 to 2014 he played Jamie McAllister in River City. In 2013, Rowley starred in an episode of Luther alongside Idris Elba, Rowley is purported to be the youngest actor to have played Macbeth, at the age of 25, in the 2018 version directed by Kit Monkman.

From 2017 to 2022, Rowley played the role of the Irish warrior Finan, Uhtred's sidekick in battle, in the Netflix television medieval drama The Last Kingdom alongside Alexander Dreymon.

Rowley played a leading role in the 2018 short film Lift Share, which premiered at the Edinburgh International Film Festival in June 2018.

In 2020, Rowley appeared as Bain in the BBC's The North Water, along with fellow The Last Kingdom actor, Eliza Butterworth. He also landed a recurring role as Alexander Stewart in series 2 of Starz historical drama The Spanish Princess about Catherine of Aragon before she married Henry VIII.

Filming began in January 2022 of Seven Kings Must Die, a feature length film involving the surviving characters from The Last Kingdom, released in 2023.

In 2022, Rowley joined the cast of the Netflix miniseries The Witcher: Blood Origin, set in a time 1,200 years before The Witcher, and Rowley stars as Prince Alvitirin in a cast which includes Lenny Henry and Michelle Yeoh. The miniseries aired on 25 December 2022.

== Filmography ==
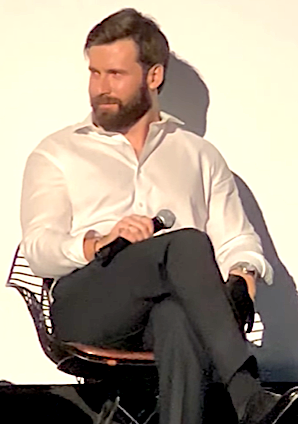
Mark Rowley interview Seven Kings Must Die 2023

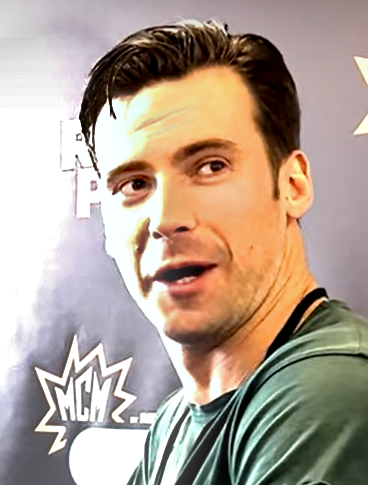
Mark Rowley in 2021

=== Film ===
Year	Title	Role	Notes
2018	Macbeth	Macbeth	
2019	Guns Akimbo	Dane	
2023	T.I.M.	Paul	
2023	The Eye	Felix	Released in film festivals

=== Television ===
Year	Title	Role	Notes
2011	Case Histories	Josh Fairlie	Episode: "Case Histories, Part 1"
2012	Doctors	Kenny Laughlin	Episode: "Carry on Cruising"
2013	Luther	Callum	Episode #3.3
2013–2014	River City	Jamie McAllister	3 episodes
2014	Young Dracula	Piers	4 episodes
2016	Home Fires	Stephen Banks	2 episodes
2017–2022	The Last Kingdom	Finan	36 episodes
2020	The Spanish Princess	Alexander Stewart	5 episodes
2021	Domina	Varica	Episode: "Happiness"
2021	The North Water	Bain	Episode: "Behold the Man"
2022	The Witcher: Blood Origin	Prince Alvitirin	
2023	The Last Kingdom: Seven Kings Must Die	Finan	TV film
2024	One Day	Phil Godalming	2 episodes
2024	SAS: Rogue Heroes	Jock McDiarmid	6 episodes
2025	Karen Pirie	Young Mick Prentice	3 episodes
2025	Trigger Point	Rich Manning	3 episodes
2026	The Dark	Detective Connor Crawford	6 Episodes

=== Video games ===
Year	Title	Role
2015	Assassin's Creed: Syndicate	Alexander Graham Bell (voice)
2017	Star Wars: Battlefront II	Voice Talent (voice)
2018	Battlefield V	Voice Talent (voice)
2022	The Diofield Chronicle	William Hende (English version, voice)
