= Unnaipol Oruvan (2009 film) =

- Theatrical release poster in Tamil
- Directed by: Chakri Toleti
- Written by: Neeraj Pandey; Kamal Haasan; E. R. Murugan
- Dialogues by: Neelakanta (Telugu)
- Based on: A Wednesday! by Neeraj Pandey
- Produced by: Kamal Haasan; Chandra Haasan; Ronnie Screwvala
- Starring: Mohanlal (Tamil); Kamal Haasan; Venkatesh (Telugu)
- Cinematography: Manoj Soni
- Edited by: Rameshwar S. Bhagat
- Music by: Shruti Haasan
- Production companies: Raaj Kamal Films International; UTV Motion Pictures
- Release date: 18 September 2009
- Running time: 109 minutes (Tamil); 106 minutes (Telugu)
- Country: India
- Languages: Tamil; Telugu

Unnaipol Oruvan (also released internationally under the translated title Someone Like You) is a 2009 Indian Tamil-language thriller film directed by Chakri Toleti (in his directorial debut). It stars Mohanlal and Kamal Haasan in the lead roles. The film was simultaneously made in Telugu as Eenadu (transl. Today) with Venkatesh playing Mohanlal's role. Both are remakes of the 2008 Hindi film A Wednesday!. Set in Chennai and Hyderabad in the Tamil and Telugu versions respectively, the story depicts the confrontation between an anonymous caller who has planted bombs in the city and wants four terrorists to be released, and a police commissioner who tries to hunt him down.

Released on 18 September 2009, both Unnaipol Oruvan and Eenadu received positive reviews from critics and were commercially successful. The film marked Mohanlal's return to Tamil cinema in a lead role after Pop Carn (2003). Unnaipol Oruvan has attained a cult following throughout the decade and is considered as one of the best investigation thriller films in Tamil cinema.

== Plot ==
I.G Govindan Raghavan Maarar (Eashwar Prasad in Telugu version), the recently dismissed Commissioner of Police of Chennai (Hyderabad in Telugu version), describes in a voice-over about his sudden termination from the police, due to a common man who walked into his life. An unnamed man is shown strategically placing a travel bag on a train at the city's Central railway station and in a shopping mall. He then proceeds to place another bag, under the pretense of lodging an FIR, in the toilet of a police station in Anna Salai, Chennai (Lakdi-ka-pool, Hyderabad in Telugu version), and then arrives on the rooftop of an under-construction building and sets up his base of operations, equipped with gadgets and instruments.

The caller calls up the Commissioner and informs him that five bombs have been planted in locations throughout city, which are programmed to explode simultaneously within 4 hours. The caller demands that he would like to negotiate with a senior government official, who has the full authority. Commissioner seeks the services of the chief secretary to act as the negotiator and also alerts his team involved in intelligence research and surveillance, tapping all the available resources in gathering preliminary information and tracing the location of the caller, who later tips off news reporter Natasha Rajkumar (Shilpa Krishna in Telugu version), telling her to reach Anna Salai police station immediately. The Commissioner initially suspects the caller to be bluffing, but his doubts are dispelled as the caller, to prove his seriousness and the police force's helplessness, reveals that a bomb has been planted in the Anna Salai police station.

When the bomb disposal squad find the bomb, there is only three minutes left. They manage to deactivate the bomb after following the caller's instructions. Natasha reaches the scene on the caller's instructions and reports about the situation. An intense debate ensues between the Commissioner and the chief secretary on who would act as the negotiator with the caller. The chief secretary appoints Commissioner as the State's negotiator with unrestricted power for few hours. The caller sequentially calls and taunts the Commissioner, probing him for his views on religion and philosophy, and finally asks the State to release three terrorists and one convicted arms seller, all who were arrested by Commissioner years ago. Commissioner's men realise that the caller is using advanced software to automatically switch the numbers and locations of his mobile phone SIM card every minute, rendering their manpower and the obsolete equipment useless and prompting them to employ the services of a young hacker, an IIT drop-out.

In the meantime, the Commissioner is able to obtain a facial composite of the caller with help of the police officer to whom the caller had approached to lodge the fake FIR, but much of the time passes without any concrete results on the identity or the location of the caller. Ultimately, Commissioner agrees with the caller's demand and puts two of his best men, Arif Khan and Sethuraman (Gautham Reddy in Telugu version), in charge of handing over the four terrorists at the Sholavaram (Begumpet in Telugu version) airstrip. Once there, the caller confirms the identity of the four men via a conference call with Arif and the Commissioner. He then asks Arif and Sethu to unlock their handcuffs and leave them alone at a particular spot. Sethu orders his men to do as told but, at the last moment, Arif decides not to hand over terrorist Abdullah, to ensure all the information regarding the locations of the bombs can be forced out from the caller.

Sethu argues with Arif and demands he do as ordered, but Arif forcefully grabs Abdullah and starts walking away. The other three enter a car which explodes soon after, killing them, but the caller knows that Abdullah is alive, and threatens to blow up the remaining bombs across the city unless Arif and Sethu kill Abdullah. The Chief Secretary tells the Commissioner that the CM has to know about the current situation but the Commissioner disagrees and tells her that he will face the consequences, and orders Arif to kill the terrorist. Arif kills Abdullah and Sethu shoots Arif in the hand to make it look like an attack for self-defense. The caller confirms it via the news and reveals that he was bluffing and there are no more bombs anywhere in Chennai. He tells that as terrorism is instant, justice and safety must be so. Then the Commissioner questions the IIT hacker to trace the caller, but he refuses.

The Commissioner looks in the hacker's computer, discovers the location, and leaves abruptly towards the site. The caller, meanwhile, destroys all of his gadgets with a mini bomb inside a drum. As he leaves his hideout with all his camouflage, the Commissioner catches up to him. Both shake hands; in a voiceover, Commissioner says the caller told him his real name but does not reveal it as it does not have any significance. He adds that the higher most officials saved themselves by framing him as a recluse and the CM fired him. Commissioner admits that they all knew the caller was disturbed because of the insecure environment and the incompetence of the governing authorities but he never imagined him to go to such lengths and have the guts to do something like that. He also repeats that the facts of this incident cannot be found in any written records but only in the memories of those who actually witnessed it. Commissioner acknowledges that although the incident has ambiguous moral significance, he personally feels that whatever happened, happened for the best and he walked away.

== Cast ==
Cast (Tamil)	Cast (Telugu)	Role (Tamil)	Role (Telugu)
Kamal Haasan		The Anonymous Caller	The Anonymous Caller
Mohanlal	Venkatesh	DGP I. G. Raghavan Maraar	DGP Eashwar Prasad
Lakshmi		Chief Secretary of Tamil Nadu	Chief Secretary of Andhra Pradesh
Anuja Iyer		Natasha Rajkumar	Shilpa Krishna
Poonam Kaur		Anuradha "Anu" Sethuraman	Anu Gowtham Reddy
Ganesh Venkatraman		Inspector Arif Khan	Inspector Arif Khan
Bharath Reddy		Inspector Sethuraman	Inspector Gowtham Reddy
Mukhtar Khan		Ibrahim Abdullah	Ibrahim Abdullah
Prem Kumar		Inspector Zakariah	Inspector Francis
Sriman		Aravind Adhavar	Aravind Babu
Santhana Bharathi		Karamchand Lala	Karamchand Lala
M. S. Bhaskar		Pankajaksha	Complainant
R. S. Shivaji		Sub-Inspector K. Baburaj	Sub-Inspector Babu Rao
Sarath Mandava		Police Inspector	Police Inspector
Karate Raja		Ahmedallah	Ahmedallah
Mahesh		Inaithullah	Inaithullah
Anand Krishnamoorthi		Hacker Arun	Hacker Arun
Prem Nizaar		Inspector Naik	Inspector Naik
Kasi Nadimpalli		Bomb Squad Murali	Bomb Squad Murali
Rohit Khurana		Cameraman Giri	Cameraman Giri
Unknown	Sivannarayana	Interrogation Room Doctor	Interrogation Room Doctor
A. S. Ramana		Rafiq	Rafiq
Gautami		The Anonymous Caller's wife – voice only	The Anonymous Caller's wife – voice only
Shruti Haasan		Cameo appearances in promotional song	Cameo appearances in promotional song
Blaaze		Cameo appearances in promotional song	Cameo appearances in promotional song

== Production ==
Poster of Telugu version

The film is the directorial debut of Chakri Toleti. The title Unnaipol Oruvan was derived from a novel by Jayakanthan. The project was first reported in February 2009, and started filming that April The film, a Tamil-Telugu bilingual, stars Kamal Haasan in both versions, with Mohanlal appearing only in Tamil and Venkatesh in Telugu. It was shot with a Red One camera.

== Themes ==
According to Kamal Haasan, Unnaipol Oruvan portrays the "common man's anger, angst and suffering". The British Board of Film Classification noted the film had a vigilante theme, as a character placed lives under threat and murdered convicts because of a lack of faith in the justice system.

== Soundtrack ==
Unnai Pol Oruvan / Eenadu

Soundtrack album by Shruti Haasan
- Released: 6 September 2009
- Recorded: 2009
- Genre: Soundtrack
- Length: 21:26
- Languages: Tamil; Telugu
- Labels: Sony Music South; Aditya Music
External audio
- Official Audio Jukebox (Telugu) on YouTube

The music was composed by Shruti Haasan in her debut as a music composer. The album contains four songs and a remix. The audio launch was held on 6 September 2009 at Sathyam Cinemas.

Tamil Track List

No.	Title	Lyrics	Singer(s)	Length
1.	"Unnaipol Oruvan"	Kamal Haasan	Shruthi Haasan, Akshara Haasan, Subbalakshmi, Satish, Leo, Krishnan Swaminathan, Bala, Mira, Tara, Aiden	3:43
2.	"Nilai Varumaa"	Kamal Haasan	Bombay Jayashree, Kamal Haasan	4:44
3.	"Vaanam Ellai...Illai"	Kamal Haasan, Blaaze (Rap bit)	Shruti Haasan, Blaaze	3:15
4.	"Allah Jaane"	Manushyaputhiran	Kamal Haasan	5:10
5.	"Allah Jaane (Remix)"	Remix by Vinayaka	Shruti Haasan	4:34
Total length:				21:26

Telugu Track List

No.	Title	Lyrics	Singer(s)	Length
1.	"Eenaadu"	Vennelakanti	Shruthi Haasan, Subbalakshmi, Satish, Leo, Krishnan Swaminathan, Bala, Mira, Tara, Aiden	3:43
2.	"Eenaadu Ee Samaram""	Vennelakanti	Bombay Jayashree, Kamal Haasan	4:44
3.	"Ningi Haddu"	Bhuvana Chandra, Blaaze (Rap bit)	Shruti Haasan, Blaaze	3:15
4.	"Allah Jaane"	Veturi	Kamal Haasan	5:10
5.	"Allah Jaane (Remix)"	Veturi	Shruti Haasan	4:34
Total length:				21:26

== Release ==
Unnaipol Oruvan was initially set to release on 12 August 2009, since the date coincided with the release of Kamal Haasan's first film Kalathur Kannamma. However, owing to technical and administrative difficulties, the release was postponed. Prior to the revised 18 September date, Pyramid Saimira attempted to stall the film's release, citing Haasan's unpaid dues to them. The film was given a U/A (Parental Guidance) rating from the Central Board of Film Certification after the makers decided against making certain cuts to avoid affecting the plot. In 2015, the Telugu version Eeenadu was screened at the Habitat Film Festival.

=== Critical reception ===
Writing for The Hollywood Reporter, Gautaman Bhaskaran wrote that Unnaipol Oruvan is "far more engaging and energetic than its predecessor" and that "superstar Mohanlal plays Chennai police commissioner Raghavan Maraar with rare finesse and extraordinary subtlety ... His screen presence is so overwhelming that an equally great Tamil superstar, Kamal Haasan, as the nameless Common Man, is overshadowed". Sify said that technically the film is picture-perfect and that both Kamal Haasan and Mohanlal coming together is worth the ticket money. It mentioned that unlike in the Hindi version where Naseeruddin Shah had an edge over Anupam Kher, here the best dialogues were almost equally given to Mohanlal as well, "what elevates the film to a new high is the crisp presentation and outstanding performances from the lead actors, mainly Kamal and Mohanlal, who simply rock". The Times of India gave the film 3.5 out of 5 stars and stated that "Debutant director Chakri Toleti's job is a cakewalk. Having chosen a proven subject, and a formidable star cast which does not have to be told anything beyond the shooting schedule, the captain's hat sits on his head easily". Regarding the Telugu version, Rediff.com stated that "For the Telugu audience, Eenadu is a film which is out of the formulaic pattern and the hero warp Telugu cinema is in, and shows that films like it can be made too which can be seen and enjoyed with the audience taking home something extra too!" The Times of India gave the film 3 out of 5 stars and stated that "The much-awaited Eenadu lives up to the big expectations and carries the essence of the original (A Wednesday)".
