= Veera Simha Reddy =

2023 Indian film by Gopichand Malineni

- Theatrical release poster
- Directed by: Gopichand Malineni
- Screenplay by: Gopichand Malineni
- Dialogue by: Sai Madhav Burra
- Story by: Gopichand Malineni
- Produced by: Naveen Yerneni; Yalamanchili Ravi Shankar
- Starring: Nandamuri Balakrishna; Varalaxmi Sarathkumar; Shruti Haasan; Honey Rose; Duniya Vijay
- Cinematography: Rishi Punjabi
- Edited by: Naveen Nooli
- Music by: S. Thaman
- Production company: Mythri Movie Makers
- Release date: 12 January 2023
- Running time: 172 minutes
- Country: India
- Language: Telugu
- Budget: est.₹70 – ₹90 crore
- Box office: est.₹134 crore

Veera Simha Reddy is a 2023 Indian Telugu-language action film written and directed by Gopichand Malineni and produced by Mythri Movie Makers. It stars Nandamuri Balakrishna in a dual role, alongside Varalaxmi Sarathkumar, Shruti Haasan, Honey Rose and Duniya Vijay. The film score and soundtrack were composed by S. Thaman.

Principal photography commenced in February 2022 and ended in December 2022. Veera Simha Reddy was released on 12 January 2023, coinciding on the Sankranthi weekend and clashing with Waltair Veeraya. The film received negative reviews from critics and audiences, but performed well at the box-office, grossing over ₹134 crore worldwide.

== Plot ==
In Istanbul, Meenakshi runs a "Rayalaseema Cuisine" restaurant and lives with her son Jai Simha Reddy, who owns a car dealership. During an altercation at the dealership, Jai meets Isha, a struggling singer, and the two fall in love. Jai and Meenakshi later visit Isha's father Jayaram, a wealthy tycoon, to propose marriage. While the talks are proceeding, Meenakshi reveals to Isha's parents that Jai's father is Veera Simha Reddy, a powerful leader from Anantapuram, Andhra Pradesh known for his efforts to end Rayalaseema factionalism.

Veera Simha Reddy commands respect for mediating disputes and attempting to curb regional feuds. He is the primary target of rival faction leader Pratap Reddy, who repeatedly fails to assassinate him. Pratap Reddy's callous wife and Veera Simha Reddy's sister Bhanumati resents him deeply, believing he is responsible for her lifelong suffering. With encouragement from his minister uncle Peddi Reddy, Pratap Reddy plots to illegally seize a factory owned by industrialist Rajagopal. When Rajagopal seeks Veera Simha Reddy's help, the latter confronts the conspirators and warns them against further wrongdoing.

Meanwhile, Meenakshi invites Veera Simha Reddy to Istanbul, marking his first meeting with Jai, who does not know his true identity. Though Meenakshi and Veera Simha Reddy were never formally married, Jayaram accepts their relationship and agrees to the match between Jai and Isha. However, Jayaram fears retaliation from Pratap Reddy's faction due to his investment in the disputed factory. Pratap Reddy, alerted to Veera Simha Reddy's presence in Turkey, attacks him there.

During the confrontation, when Veera Simha Reddy is about to kill Pratap Reddy, Bhanumati calls Veera Simha Reddy out, revealing that she is actually his sister. She begs him to spare her husband, which he does, but she and Pratap Reddy then stab him and leave him for dead. Jai attempts to fight back, but his father stops him, declaring he would lay down his life for his sister. Before dying, Veera Simha Reddy asks Jai to bring his body home to Rayalaseema and perform his final rites. In the village, Jai conducts the funeral amid massive crowds. Searching for the truth behind Bhanumati's hatred, he hears the past from Siddappa, Veera Simha Reddy's right-hand man.

Past: Years earlier, Bhanumati was born out of wedlock to Veera Simha Reddy's father. Despite this, Veera Simha Reddy loved her devotedly. Meenakshi, his cross-cousin, hoped to marry him after Bhanumati's future was secured. At the time, Musali Madugu, the adjacent village, suffered constant torment at the hands of Gangi Reddy, Pratap Reddy's father. When a child from Musali who was a victim of Gangi Reddy's atrocities sought help, Veera Simha Reddy confronted the oppressor and decapitated Gangi Reddy, sowing enmity with Pratap Reddy. Bhanumati also fell in love with Siddappa's son Shekar, and Veera Simha Reddy wholeheartedly approved their marriage. During annual traditional contests, Pratap Reddy delayed Veera Simha Reddy, prompting Shekar to participate in his place, where he was beaten and humiliated. Later, a drunk and traumatized Shekar fired a gun, accidentally killing a villager, Suri. Dedicated to justice, Veera Simha Reddy ostracized Shekar, leading the guilt-ridden Shekar to commit suicide. Bhanumati, devastated, blamed Veera Simha Reddy for destroying her happiness and vowed revenge. She married Pratap Reddy solely to see her brother killed and forbade her husband from touching her until then. Veera Simha Reddy renounced comforts in remorse and sent Meenakshi away, unaware she was pregnant with Jai.

Present: After hearing the truth, Jai confronts Rajagopal's persecutors, determined to fulfill his father's mission. During a confrontation, Pratap Reddy insults and strikes Bhanumati, revealing that he manipulated her grief to ignite hatred. He also reveals that he killed Sekhar after the latter refused the former's request to kill Veera Simha Reddy. Realizing her mistakes, a remorseful Bhanumati commits suicide, freeing Jai from any familial obligation. During her cremation, Pratap Reddy attacks, but Jai onslaughts him. In the final battle, he kills Pratap Reddy and merges Bhanumati's ashes with Veera Simha Reddy's grave. Jai then vows to uphold his father's ideals and continue his legacy of justice in Rayalaseema.

== Cast ==
- Nandamuri Balakrishna in a dual role as
  - Pulicherla Veera Simha Reddy
    - Master Sri Ghana as child Veera Simha Reddy
  - Jai Veera Simha Reddy: Veera Simha Reddy and Meenakshi's son
- Shruti Haasan as Isha Jai Simha Reddy, Veera Simha Reddy and Meenakshi's daughter-in-law
- Varalaxmi Sarathkumar as Bhanumathi Pratap Reddy, Veera Simha Reddy's sister, Pratap Reddy's wife and Jai Simha Reddy's aunt
  - Baby Aadhya as child Bhanumati
- Honey Rose as Pulicherla Meenakshi VeeraSimha Reddy; Veera Simha Reddy's wife and Jai's mother; Isha's mother-in-law
- Duniya Vijay as Musali Madugu Pratap Reddy, Veera Simha Reddy's rival and brother-in-law, Gangi Reddy's son and Bhanumati's husband; Jai Simha Reddy's uncle and enemy (voice dubbed by P. Ravi Shankar)
- Lal as Siddhappa, Veera Simha Reddy's right-hand man
- Naveen Chandra as Shekhar Reddy, Siddhappa's son and Bhanumati's ex-fiancé
- Rupesh Marrapu as Sekhar's friend
- Ajay Ghosh as Addibakula Peddi Reddy, Pratap Reddy's uncle
- Murali Sharma as Jayaram, Isha's father; Jai 's father-in-law
- John Kokken as Raja Reddy, Pratap Reddy's cousin
- P. Ravi Shankar as Home Minister Krishna Reddy
- Killi Kranthi as Keshava
- B. S. Avinash as Musali Madugu Gangi Reddy, Pratap Reddy's father
- Pammi Sai as Sai Reddy, Peddi Reddy's PA
- Sachin Khedekar as Rajagopal, Factory Owner
- Raghu Babu as Durga Reddy, Bhanumati's suitor's father
- Saptagiri as Giri, Jai's supervisor
- Rajeev Kanakala as Suri Reddy, a villager
- Sekhar as Veeranna, Suri's brother-in-law
- Esther Roman as Siddhappa's wife
- Sameer as Rudra Reddy, Veera Simha Reddy's father
- Annapurna as Veera Simha Reddy's grandmother
- Rajitha as Veera Simha Reddy's relative
- Rajashree as Meenakshi's mother
- Naga Mahesh as Varada Reddy, a villager
- Goparaju Ramana as head priest
- Duvvasi Mohan as a priest
- Ananth Babu as a priest
- Chammak Chandra
- Archana Ananth as Isha's mother
- Aruna Bhikshu as Isha's grandmother
- Harika Koyilamma as Isha's sister
- Siva Krishna as Ramgopal Reddy
- Meena Kumari as Veera Simha Reddy's relative
- Chandrika Ravi in item number "Maa Bava Manobhavalu"
- Ramajogayya Sastry in a cameo appearance
- Brahmanandam in a cameo appearance as Ismail, a judge in the "Voice of Europe" music show
- Ali in a cameo appearance as Darbar, a judge in the "Voice of Europe" music show
- Manisha Eerabathini in a cameo appearance as host in the "Voice of Europe" music show
- Master Sathwik as a son of the victim of Gangi Reddy
- Supriya Aysola as the victim of Gangi Reddy

== Production ==
=== Development ===
In late January 2021, it was reported that Gopichand Malineni would team up with Nandamuri Balakrishna for his next directional, funded by Naveen Yerneni and Y. Ravi Shankar under Mythri Movie Makers. The project was officially announced on 10 June, on the occasion of Balakrishna's birthday, with the working title NBK107. Thaman S was brought on board to compose the score. A muhurtam ceremony was held on 13 November in Hyderabad.

=== Casting ===
In mid June 2021, Varalaxmi Sarathkumar was reported to play an important role in the film. In mid August, Vijay Sethupathi was reported to play the lead antagonist role, thus making the film as his second Telugu film after Uppena (2021), but turned to be false. In October, Shruti Haasan was reported to play the lead female role, alongside Balakrishna. She was reported to receive ₹2.5 crore (US$270,000) for remuneration. Shruti's commitments were officially announced on 5 November. Kannada actor Duniya Vijay was announced playing the lead antagonist on 3 January 2022. Few days later, Varalaxmi's commitments were officially announced.

=== Filming ===
Principal photography begam on 18 February 2022 in Sircilla and commenced in December. In October 2022, the film's official title was unveiled as Veera Simha Reddy.

== Music ==
Veera Simha Reddy

Soundtrack album by Thaman S
- Released: 9 January 2023
- Recorded: 2022
- Genre: Feature film soundtrack
- Length: 15:16
- Language: Telugu
- Label: Sony Music India

Thaman S chronology
Varisu (2023)	Veera Simha Reddy (2023)	Bro (2023)

Singles from Veera Simha Reddy
- 1. "Jai Balayya (Mass Anthem)" Released: 26 November 2022; 2. "Suguna Sundari" Released: 15 December 2022; 3. "Maa Bava Manobhavalu" Released: 24 December 2022; 4. "Mass Mogudu" Released: 9 January 2023

The music of the film is composed by Thaman S. The first single titled "Jai Balayya" was released on 26 November 2022. The second single titled "Suguna Sundari" was released on 15 December 2022. The third single titled "Maa Bava Manobhavalu" was released on 24 December 2022. The fourth single titled "Mass Mogudu" was released on 9 January 2023.

All lyrics are written by Ramajogayya Sastry.

Track listing
No.	Title	Singer(s)	Length
1.	"Jai Balayya" (Mass Anthem)	Kareemullah	3:51
2.	"Suguna Sundari"	Ram Miriyala, Snigdha Sharma	4:14
3.	"Maa Bava Manobhavalu"	Sahiti Chaganti, Yamini, Renu Kumar	4:49
4.	"Mass Mogudu"	Mano, Ramya Behara	3:27
Total length:			15:16

== Release ==
=== Theatrical ===
Veera Simha Reddy released on 12 January 2023, for the Sankranti weekend. Theatrical rights of the film were sold at a cost of ₹73 crore.

=== Home media ===
The digital streaming rights of the film were acquired by JioHotstar for ₹14 crore, and was premiered on 23 February 2023. It was premiered on television on Star Maa on 23 April 2023.

== Reception ==
=== Critical reception ===
On the review aggregator website Rotten Tomatoes, 40% of 5 critics' reviews are positive, with an average rating of 3/10.

Neeshita Nyayapati of The Times of India gave 2.5 out of 5 stars and wrote "Veera Simha Reddy is Balakrishna’s film through-and-through. However, where he triumphs as Veera, he fails as Jai. Whenever the man comes on-screen donned is black is when you feel like paying attention, his cakey makeup and lukewarm performance while playing the other character takes away from it." Janani K of India Today gave the film a rating of 2.5 out of 5 and termed the film as "reeks of clichéd ideas", criticised the storyline while praised the performance of Balakrishna.

Haricharan Pudipeddi of Hindustan Times wrote "The film thrives on violence and some exquisitely shot action sequences, which are a treat to watch. As the central character Veera Simha Reddy, Balakrishna holds the film together and its quite literally a one-man show." Bhuvanesh Chandar of The Hindu wrote "Violent scenes that bank on shock value, powerful antagonists, and an intriguing larger narrative worked well to complement the slow-motion chest-thumping moments. In Veera Simha Reddy, we have a loosely knit and archaic narrative told through a template screenplay." Manoj Kumar R of The Indian Express rated the film 0.5 out of 5 stars and wrote "The troubling part of Veera Simha Reddy, by that token most of Balakrishna's movies, is that it argues its okay to kill to solve a problem".

=== Box office ===
Veera Simha Reddy grossed ₹54+ crore worldwide on its opening day, including ₹36.2 crore from Andhra Pradesh and Telangana combined. Thus, it became the highest opening grosser for Nandamuri Balakrishna. The film has grossed US$747,000 by the first day of its release in the United States. By the end of its theatrical run, Veera Simha Reddy grossed ₹134 crore worldwide including a distributors' share of ₹79.82 crore.

== Accolades ==
Award (Note: Awards, festivals and organizations are in alphabetical order.)	Date of ceremony (Note: Date is linked to the article about the awards held that year, wherever possible.)	Category	Recipient(s)	Result	Ref.
Santosham Film Awards	2 December 2023	Best Director	Gopichand Malineni	Won	
South Indian International Movie Awards	14 September 2024	Best Director – Telugu	Gopichand Malineni	Nominated	
South Indian International Movie Awards	14 September 2024	Best Actress – Telugu	Shruti Haasan	Nominated	
South Indian International Movie Awards	14 September 2024	Best Supporting Actress – Telugu	Varalaxmi Sarathkumar	Nominated	
South Indian International Movie Awards	14 September 2024	Best Actor in a Negative Role – Telugu	Duniya Vijay	Won	
South Indian International Movie Awards	14 September 2024	Best Music Director – Telugu	Thaman S	Nominated	
South Indian International Movie Awards	14 September 2024	Best Lyricist – Telugu	Sri Mani ("Ori Vaari")	Nominated	
South Indian International Movie Awards	14 September 2024	Best Female Playback Singer – Telugu	Sahiti Chaganti, Satya Yamini ("Maa Bava Manobhavalu")	Nominated	
IIFA Utsavam	27 September 2024	Performance in a Supporting Role – Female	Varalaxmi Sarathkumar	Won	
