= Krack (film) =

2021 Indian film by Gopichand Malineni

- Theatrical release poster
- Directed by: Gopichand Malineni
- Screenplay by: Gopichand Malineni
- Dialogue by: Sai Madhav Burra
- Story by: Gopichand Malineni
- Produced by: 'Tagore' B. Madhu
- Starring: Ravi Teja; Shruti Haasan; Samuthirakani; Varalaxmi Sarathkumar
- Cinematography: G. K. Vishnu
- Edited by: Naveen Nooli
- Music by: Thaman S
- Production company: Saraswathi Films Division
- Distributed by: Sri Sravanthi Movies
- Release date: 9 January 2021
- Running time: 154 minutes
- Country: India
- Language: Telugu
- Box office: est. ₹70.6 crore

Krack is a 2021 Indian Telugu-language action thriller film directed by Gopichand Malineni, who wrote the script with the dialogues by Sai Madhav Burra. It stars Ravi Teja, Shruti Haasan, Samuthirakani, and Varalaxmi Sarathkumar. Produced by B. Madhu under Saraswathi Films Division banner and based on multiple true incidents that took place in the states of Andhra Pradesh and Telangana, the film depicts the conflict between a circle inspector and a gangster. The film's narrative style is inspired from 2018 Kannada film Tagaru.

After the launch at a formal ceremony on 14 November 2019 at Hyderabad, principal photography commenced on 21 November 2019, and ended on 7 December 2020, with production delays due to the COVID-19 pandemic. The film features music scored by Thaman S, with cinematography by G. K. Vishnu, and editing by Naveen Nooli.

Krack was released theatrically on 9 January 2021, and opened to positive reviews from critics. The film was a commercial blockbuster, grossing ₹70.6 crore at the box office. and went on to become the highest-grossing film in Teja's career until it was surpassed by Dhamaka.

== Plot ==
Venkatesh narrates that a ₹50 (52¢ US) note, a green mango, and a nail resemble the fate of three persons who come across a cop. A BBC journalist arrives at a jail in Delhi to interview Saleem Batkal, a convict responsible for Mumbai blasts, but Saleem demands money from the interviewer, which to their astonishment is just ₹50 (52¢ US).

Upon taking it, he tells that he rented a house that is ₹50 (52¢ US) cheaper than the previous one due to a scuffle between the owner and broker.

In 2010, the house Saleem rents at Kurnool for passport verification with fake details falls under the jurisdiction of Shankar's police station, where Saleem's men have no influence. After a dramatic turn of events, he is caught by Shankar, who notices the details Salim gave are fake. When Saleem tries to warn about his background, Shankar beats him up and arrests him.

Back in the present, in Kadapa, Konda Reddy, a highly sadistic goon, occupies the land of a doctor. When Konda Reddy is in a meeting, a girl tries to pluck from a mango tree in his yard, for which he angrily unleashes his dogs upon her. The girl is injured, and her mother files suit on him. The SP calls Konda Reddy, telling that this case might put Konda Reddy in trouble because it will be dealt with by CI Shankar. Konda takes him lightly, but the SP insists him to meet Katari Krishna, who is in the central jail of Rajahmundry.

Katari appears as a regular prisoner, but Konda Reddy is intrigued when he learns about Katari's criminal record. Upon asking, Katari narrates his story that he rose to power by creating a bloodshed in Ongole, and is jailed later because of a nail. Back in 2010, Shankar is appointed as CI of Ongole, and meets constable Kiran, the son of a constable who used to work with Shankar. Jayamma, a close aide of Katari's, has a habit of going to the cinema on Fridays.

Jayamma sees Katari's daughter with Kiran, and gets him grotesquely murdered by appointing men from Vetapalem. Shankar investigates about the murder, while relishing his memories with Kiran. He finds out that Katari was accused for a similar kind of murder a few years ago. At a village fair, Shankar goes to bring Katari to the police station for enquiry, Katari warns Shankar of his background, which irritates Shankar and gets him arrested.

Katari is released when Jayamma gets him a bail, but they are stunned to know that his daughter married another police constable. That night at the cinema hall, her boyfriend's leg is accidentally pierced by a nail, due to which Kiran drops her at the house. Unaware of this, Jayamma misinterprets Kiran to be her boyfriend. During their wedding reception, Katari's wife requests the couple to leave the town to be safe. She, however, conspires to kill her daughter's husband.

Katari's men attack them at the bus station, but Shankar saves them. A man caught there named Jayamma was the perpetrator. Knowing this, Katari asks his men to kill Jayamma, so that his name does not come out. At Cinema Hall Katari's Men Stabs And Slits Jayamma's Throat. Jayamma is killed by the time Shankar arrives to arrest her. While chasing the killers, he shoots one of them, but accidentally kills an innocent bystander. Shankar is suspended, but during his private investigation, he learns that his associate Tilak had killed that innocent, as he was on Katari's payroll.

Shankar gets hold of all the evidence against Katari that Tilak has. Katari tries to warn Shankar by attacking his family, but his wife Kalyani, a former police officer, is able to defend them. Shankar rejoins his job and fights with Vetapalem gang members, and kills all of them at the beach. And Shankar tracks down Katari to arrest him. Katari tries to escape by boarding a lorry, but its tyre gets punctured by a nail, and he is caught.

After learning this, Konda Reddy makes sure that he does not use the word "background" in front of Shankar, and treats him with respect, but his assistant hurriedly comes and utters the word. Shankar thrashes him and puts him in the same jail where Katari is kept. Saleem, now transferred to that jail, tells them he is trying to seek revenge on Shankar. They both laugh it off.

== Cast ==
- Ravi Teja as CI Potharaju Veera Shankar
- Shruti Haasan as Kalyani, Shankar's wife
- Samuthirakani as Katari Krishna
- Varalaxmi Sarathkumar as Jayamma
- P. Ravi Shankar as Konda Reddy (cameo appearance)
- Ali as Shankar's friend
- Vamsee Chaganti as Constable Balaji
- Sudhakar Komakula as Constable Kiran
- Satwik Malineni as Kalyani and Shankar's son
- Chirag Jani as Saleem Bathkal
- Priyanka Raman as Deepti Bedi
- Hyper Aadi as Constable
- Sapthagiri as Subba Reddy, Konda Reddy’s brother-in-law (cameo appearance)
- Posani Krishna Murali as SP
- Mukku Avinash as Constable Sai Kumar
- Aashrita Vemuganti as Katari Krishna's wife
- Anish Kuruvilla as SP Murali Sharma
- Jeeva as Local Rowdy Parvatha Seenu
- Mouryaani as Katari Nithya, Katari Krishna's daughter
- Mahesh Kathi as Kathi
- Devi Prasad as SI Tilak
- Stun Siva as Ankudu
- Goparaju Ramana
- B. V. S. Ravi as Bystander
- Rupa Lakshmi
- Raghu Babu as MLA
- Apsara Rani special appearance in the song "Bhoom Bhaddhal"
- Sameer as Doctor
- Ashok Kumar as Dr. N. Munikrishna
- Chitram Seenu as Ramana, Shankar's friend
- Chitram Basha as Police Officer
- Venkatesh Daggubati as the Narrator

== Production ==
=== Development ===
On 26 October 2019, Ravi Teja announced his 66th film as an actor with the tentative title RT 66, which would be directed by Gopichand Malineni, marking the third collaboration between Teja and Malineni after their previous films Don Seenu (2010) and Balupu (2013). Prior to commencement of the shoot, Gopichand Malieni claimed the film was neither inspired by nor a remake of any film. He described it as "an original story based on several true incidents happened in the Telugu states." On 14 November 2019, the makers announced the title of the film as Krack.

=== Casting ===
Shruti Haasan was chosen as the lead actress alongside Ravi Teja, making it their second collaboration after Balupu. Originally, she took a break from acting in Telugu films, after Pawan Kalyan's Katamarayudu (2017), made her comeback in the Telugu film industry with this film. Tamil film actress Varalaxmi Sarathkumar was chosen to play a key role, making it her second Telugu film after Tenali Ramakrishna BA. BL (2019).Samuthirakani similarly joined the cast, collaborating with Ravi Teja after Shambo Shiva Shambo (2010). (Note: Samuthirakani directed Shambo Shiva Shambo, while he acts in Krack. Both films star Ravi Teja in the lead role.) Thaman S was roped in to compose the music for the film, while cinematographer G. K. Vishnu, editor Naveen Nooli and action choreographer duo Ram-Lakshman, were also a part of the technical crew.

=== Filming ===
The film was launched on 14 November 2019 at the Film Nagar Temple. (Note: A Hyderabad-based temple built by the Telugu film association) Producer Allu Aravind attended as the chief guest and did the honours. The principal photography commenced on 21 November 2019 in Ramoji Film City. Around late November, the makers filmed a Jatara episode featuring Ravi Teja and hundreds of supporting actors. During the shoot in early January 2020, director A. R. Murugadoss visited the film's sets in Hyderabad. The film's shoot was further interrupted due to the COVID-19 pandemic lockdown in India.

On 7 October 2020, Ravi Teja announced that he had resumed the shooting of the film at Ramoji Film City in Hyderabad, after lockdown, adhering to the safety guidelines imposed by the government in order to curb the coronavirus pandemic. On 15 October, the makers filmed a song shoot, featuring Anketa Maharana and Teja and the song being choreographed by Jani Master. Varalakshmi Sarathkumar, completed her portions in late October. On 2 December, Ravi Teja tweeted about the final schedule of the film held in Goa, which features a song shoot choreographed by Raju Sundaram. Filming wrapped up on 5 December 2020.

== Music ==
Krack

Soundtrack album by Thaman S
- Released: 8 January 2021
- Recorded: 2020
- Studios: Prasad labs (Hyderabad); YRF (Mumbai); V studios (Chennai)
- Genre: Feature film soundtrack
- Length: 18:35
- Language: Telugu
- Labels: Lahari Music; T-Series
- Producer: Thaman S

Thaman S chronology
Solo Brathuke So Better (2020)	Krack (2021)	Eeswaran (2021)

Singles from Krack
- 1. "Bhoom Bhaddhal" Released: 13 November 2020; 2. "Ballega Tagilavey Bangaram" Released: 14 December 2020; 3. "Korameesam Polisoda" Released: 25 December 2020; 4. "Mass Biriyani" Released: 4 January 2021

The film's music is composed by Thaman S, and lyrics for the songs were written by Ramajogayya Sastry and Kasarla Shyam. The film marks the second collaboration of Ravi Teja, Thaman and Gopichand Malineni after Balupu (2013). In May 2020, a fake Twitter handle of the film's director, announced an update about the first single, whereas the composer refuted such claims and asked the fans to wait for the official announcement.

The first single, "Bhoom Bhaddhal", was released on 13 November 2020, coinciding with the eve of Diwali. On 10 December 2020, the makers tweeted about the second single, which will be sung by noted Tamil film composer Anirudh Ravichander, which was later titled as "Balega Tagilavey Bangaram" and was released on 14 December 2020. The third single track "Korameesam Polisoda" was released on the occasion of Christmas, 25 December 2020. The fourth song of the film titled "Mass Biriyani" was unveiled on 4 January 2021.

Lahari Music released the complete soundtrack album featuring five tracks on 8 January 2021, which included the four songs that were released as singles earlier.

All lyrics are written by Ramajogayya Sastry, except where noted.

Track listing
No.	Title	Singer(s)	Length
1.	"Bhoom Bhaddhal"	Mangli, Simha	4:22
2.	"Balega Tagilavey Bangaram"	Anirudh Ravichander	3:43
3.	"Korameesam Polisoda"	Ramya Behara	3:41
4.	"Mass Biriyani" (Lyrics written by Kasarla Shyam)	Rahul Nambiar, Sahiti Chaganti	3:58
5.	"The Theme of Katari"	Sri Krishna, Saicharan	2:50
Total length:			18:35

=== Allegations of plagiarism ===
Despite no copyright issues, the song "Balega Tagilyave Bangaram" composed by Thaman, was criticised for allegedly copying the tunes from a Latin song "Selva". Another allegation was raised stating that "Mass Biryani" song has similar tunes from the song "Kajal Chellivaa" of 2013 Telugu film Balupu, which was composed by himself starring same trio, Ravi Teja, Shruti Haasan, and Gopichand Malineni.

== Release ==
=== Theatrical ===
Krack was scheduled to release theatrically on 8 May 2020, but was postponed due to the COVID-19 pandemic. The director Gopichand Malineni, clarified that the film will be scheduled for a theatrical release, after rumours regarding the film's release on OTT platforms surfaced. On 26 October 2020, the makers announced that the film will release theatrically during the occasion of Sankranthi.

On 19 December 2020, the makers announced that the film would release on 14 January 2021, coinciding with Sankranthi. However, at the launch event held at AMB Cinemas in Hyderabad on 1 January 2021, where the film's trailer was released, director Gopichand Malineni announced a new release date of 9 January 2021. The pre-release business of the film in the Telugu states considered to be ₹13 crore from the Telugu states alone.

The film's US premiere shows on 8 January, and the morning and afternoon shows in India were cancelled, due to the financial tussles between the exhibitors and its producer B. Madhu. The financiers reportedly took the legal route to stall the release of the film, demanding that producer Madhu, had to clear the dues owed by them, after the failure of his Vishal-starrer Ayogya (2019). After clearing the negotiations, the makers premiered evening shows of the film.

=== Home media ===
The film was released on OTT platform Aha on 6 February 2021. The satellite rights of the film were acquired by Star Maa, premiered on 14 March 2021 and registered an average TRP rating of 11.7. The Hindi version premiered first on Miniplex TV channel on 4 June 2021 and then on Zee Cinema on 27 June 2021. However the dubbing of the Hindi dub premiered on Miniplex was panned by the viewers, especially that of Ravi Teja's. The second Hindi dub with Amar Babaria's voice for Ravi Teja was premiered on Zee Cinema. The Tamil version of the film was telecast through Zee Tamil on 1 August 2021.

== Reception ==
=== Critical response ===
Krack received positive reviews from critics with praise for the performances, writing and screenplay. The Times of India critic Thadhagath Pathi gave 3.5 out of 5 stars, stating, "A wholesome commercial cop drama and mass entertainer from Mass Maharaj himself after a very long time." Hemanth Kumar of Firstpost gave the film a rating of 3 out of 5 stating "The biggest crack in Krack is evident in its attempt to build a gripping narrative. Each sequence is packed with so many details, some of which just look cool without adding anything to the narrative, that you begin to lose patience."

Karthik Keramalu of Film Companion stated, "It’s fun to watch the Mass Maharaja in Gopichand Malineni’s crowd-pleaser that’s tailor-made for his energetic presence." He also noted that a magnanimous chunk of the narrative device from the 2018 Kannada movie Tagaru to be the main source of inspiration for the template of the tweaked screenplay of this film. Janani K of India Today gave 3 out of 5 stars "Krack is a decent masala entertainer with a neat blend of commercial elements, brilliant stunt sequences, and interesting storyline. The film could have been so much more if they had done away with too much detailing. Yet, Krack holds the audience’s attention for the most part and entertains us."

=== Box office ===
The morning and noon shows for Krack were cancelled, and the film opened with evening shows. The film grossed ₹10 crore in its first two days, with a distributor share of over ₹6 crore. At the third day, the film grossed more than ₹2.81 crore, taking its total opening weekend collections to ₹23 crore. The film collected a gross of ₹31 crore after five days, and ₹40.8 crore in the first week. In 15 days, Krack grossed ₹55.2 crore, becoming the highest-grossing film of Teja's career until it was surpassed by Dhamaka. The film earned distributors a share of ₹36.23 crore. As of February 2021, the film had grossed approximately ₹70.6 crore.

=== Awards ===
SIIMA Award for Best Supporting Actress – Telugu - Varalaxmi Sarathkumar
