= D-Day (2013 film) =

2013 Indian film by Nikkhil Advani

- Theatrical release poster
- Directed by: Nikkhil Advani
- Screenplay by: Nikkhil Advani; Ritesh Shah; Suresh Nair
- Dialogues by: Niranjan Iyengar; Ritesh Shah
- Produced by: Monisha Advani; Nikkhil Advani; Madhu Bhojwani; Arun Rangachari; Vivek Rangachari
- Starring: Rishi Kapoor; Arjun Rampal; Irrfan Khan; Huma Qureshi; Shruti Haasan
- Cinematography: Tushar Kanti Ray
- Edited by: Aarif Sheikh
- Music by: Shankar–Ehsaan–Loy
- Production companies: Emmay Entertainment; DAR Motion Pictures
- Release date: 19 July 2013
- Running time: 151 minutes
- Country: India
- Language: Hindi
- Box office: ₹24 crore

D-Day is a 2013 Indian Hindi-language spy action thriller film co-written and directed by Nikkhil Advani. The film stars Rishi Kapoor, Arjun Rampal, Irrfan Khan, Huma Qureshi, and Shruti Haasan. The film was released on 19 July 2013 and received positive reviews from critics.

== Plot ==
RAW agent Wali Khan has spent nine years undercover in Pakistan as a barber while tracking Goldman, the leader of D-Company. After learning that Goldman plans to attend his son's wedding, Wali informs RAW chief Ashwini Rao, who assembles a team consisting of former army officer Rudra Pratap Singh, explosives expert Zoya Rehman, and criminal-turned-operative Aslam to capture him.

Before the operation, Wali stages the deaths of his wife and son to protect them, but unforeseen events expose his identity to the ISI. Alerted to the threat, Goldman escapes during the wedding operation, forcing the team into hiding. Disowned by the Indian government after the mission fails, the agents continue pursuing Goldman on their own, even after Wali learns that his family has been captured by the ISI.

As the ISI decides to eliminate Goldman themselves, the RAW team intercepts and kidnaps him first. Wali appears willing to trade Goldman for his family's safety, causing tension within the group. However, it is later revealed that Wali and Rudra had devised a plan to deceive both Goldman and the ISI. Wali sacrifices himself while Rudra and Zoya smuggle Goldman across the Indian border. Once in India, Goldman boasts that he will soon be released, but Rudra executes him, declaring him the face of the “New India.”

== Cast ==
- Rishi Kapoor as Iqbal Seth alias Goldman (Based on Dawood Ibrahim)
- Arjun Rampal as Rudra Pratap Singh
- Irrfan Khan as Wali Khan
- Huma Qureshi as Zoya Rehman
- Shruti Haasan as Suraiya
- Nassar as Ashwini Rao, Chief of R&AW
- K. K. Raina as General Raza
- Chandan Roy Sanyal as Bhanja, Goldman's nephew
- Nissar Khan as Niyaaz Ahmed
- Imran Hasnee as Saleem Pathan
- Sandeep Kulkarni as Anup Mishra
- Aakash Dahiya as Aslam
- Shriswara as Nafisa, Wali's wife
- Kanika Dang as Fatima
- Dwij Handa as Kabeer, Wali's son
- Ashwin Dhar as Khurram Mirza
- Manish Khanna as Sharyar Bhatt
- Pravina Deshpande as Sumitra, Ashwini's wife
- Savi Sidhu as K. S. Lodhi
- Maryam Zakaria as dancer in the item number "Ek Ghadi" (special appearance)
- Rajpal Yadav as a sufi singer (special appearance)

Rajkummar Rao makes an uncredited voiceover as Zoya's husband in a phone conversation and his face briefly appears as a desktop background image on a laptop in the film.

== Soundtrack ==
The soundtrack was composed by Shankar–Ehsaan–Loy, with lyrics written by Niranjan Iyengar.

D-Day

Soundtrack album by Shankar–Ehsaan–Loy
- Released: 28 June 2013
- Genre: Film soundtrack
- Length: 2:33
- Label: T-Series

Shankar–Ehsaan–Loy chronology
Bhaag Milkha Bhaag (2013)	D-Day (2013)	One by Two (2014)

Track listing
No.	Title	Singer(s)	Length
1.	"Dama Dam Mast Qalandar"	Mika Singh	4:40
2.	"Alvida"	Nikhil D'Souza, Sukhwinder Singh, Shruti Hassan, Loy Mendonsa, Shefali Alvares	5:06
3.	"Murshid Khele Holi"	Munnawar Masoom, Javed Ali, Shankar Mahadevan, Gaurav Gupta, Rajiv Sundaresan, Mani Mahadevan, Raman Mahadevan	7:34
4.	"Ek Ghadi"	Rekha Bhardwaj	6:43
5.	"Dhuaan"	Rahul Ram, Siddharth Mahadevan, Alyssa Mendonsa, Thomson Andrews, Keshia Braganza, Crystal Sequeira, Leon D’Souza	3:29

=== Reception ===
Sankhayan Ghosh of The Indian Express gave the album 3 out of 5 stars and described it as “an uncharacteristically authentic album according to Bollywood standards that throws up interesting results”. Rajiv Vijayakar of Bollywood Hungama gave a mixed review, stating that the soundtrack was “a mixed bag” and criticized the lyrics, though he identified “Duma Dum” as the standout track of the album.

== Release ==
D-Day was given a U/A certificate by the Central Board of Film Certification on 8 July 2013.

== Reception ==
=== Critical reception ===
Taran Adarsh of Bollywood Hungama gave the film 4 stars out of 5, writing that "D-DAY is what a well-made thriller ought to be -- taut, transfixing and spellbinding, with an astounding finale. Don't miss this high-octane thriller!" Paloma Sharma of Rediff.com wrote that "D-Day has all the ingredients that make it a memorable film". The Hindu wrote that "D-Day sends out a strong statement. The problem is that it is emotional. And modern India is not that naive". Rajeev Masand of CNN-IBN gave 3 out of 5 stars and stated that D-Day is far from perfect, but as pulpy Bollywood action films go, it's very watchable and works its strengths. The film's ending, controversial and melodramatic, to say the least, nevertheless sits comfortably with the wish-fulfilment fantasy that Advani's milking. Sneha May Francis of Emirates 24/7 described the film as a "sensational take on India’s most notorious gangster". Subhash K. Jha of IANS called the film "an acutely accomplished work of art". Deccan Chronicle praised the film and stated that Rishi Kapoor makes the best Dawood Ibrahim. He has the demeanour, and an ominous aura. NDTV gave 3 stars out of 5, writing that "D-Day is replete with such unusual touches. It is another matter that all of them do not eventually come together to make a cohesive whole. Yet, for all its flaws, this is a film good enough to merit a trip to the multiplex".

=== Box office ===
D-Day had occupancies of around 15–20% in the morning shows. It was declared a "Flop" by Box Office India, which estimated its two-week collections at ₹17.5 crore (US$1.8 million) net. D-Day collected $425,000 in its first weekend overseas.

== Awards and nominations ==
Award	Category	Recipients and nominees	Result	Ref.
6th Mirchi Music Awards	Raag-Inspired Song of the Year	"Ek Ghadi"	Won	
