= Anaganaga O Dheerudu =

2011 Indian film

- Theatrical release poster
- Directed by: Prakash Kovelamudi
- Written by: Prakash Kovelamudi
- Produced by: Prakash Kovelamudi; Prasad Devineni
- Starring: Siddharth; Shruti Haasan; Lakshmi Manchu; Baby Harshitha
- Cinematography: Soundarrajan
- Edited by: Shravan Katikaneni
- Music by: Songs: Salim–Sulaiman; Mickey J. Meyer; Koti; M. M. Keeravani; Background Score: Salim–Sulaiman
- Production companies: Walt Disney Pictures; A Bellyful of Dreams Entertainment
- Distributed by: UTV Motion Pictures
- Release date: 14 January 2011 (India)
- Country: India
- Language: Telugu
- Budget: ₹26–27 crore

Anaganaga O Dheerudu (released internationally as Once Upon A Warrior) is a 2011 Indian Telugu-language fantasy adventure film written and directed by Prakash Kovelamudi in his first mainstream film. It is produced by Walt Disney Pictures and A Bellyful of Dreams Entertainment and stars Siddharth, Shruti Haasan, and Lakshmi Manchu, and Baby Harshitha. The film focuses on the journey of Moksha, a nine-year-old girl with special healing powers, and Yodha, her fierce warrior bodyguard, as they travel to a faraway village to save its children, under the constant menace of the evil witch Irendri. Shruti Hassan and Lakshmi Manchu made their Telugu debut through this film.

It features a musical score by Salim–Sulaiman, an ensemble soundtrack by Salim–Sulaiman, M. M. Keeravani, Koti, and Mickey J. Meyer, while cinematography and editing are handled by Soundararajan and Sravan Katikaneni, respectively.

The film was released internationally on January 14, 2011, during the Sankranti festival, to average reviews and box office collections. Dubbed versions in Tamil and Malayalam were created but their release was put on hold indefinitely due to the unexpected failure of the Telugu version.

== Plot ==
Irendri (Lakshmi Manchu) is a sorceress who terrorizes people of Anga Rajyam. A guru arrests her, doesn't allow her to play with the lives of people, and destroys her. Before she was destroyed, Irendri takes her soul away and traps it in a locket. Though she dies, her soul lives in the locket. Her great-great-granddaughter is Priya (Shruthi Haasan), and she lives as a gypsy.

Priya too possesses magical powers as she was born into a sorceress' family. Yodha (Siddharth) is a travelling swordsman who always romances women whenever there is opportunity. He is smitten by Priya's beauty and falls in love with her. Sudigundam (Ravi Babu) is a local goon, and he attacks the gypsies' village. Yodha prevents him and defeats him in a fight. However, Sudigundam makes a stealth attack, ties Yodha's hands, and sets afire the entire village.

In this process, the locket in Priya's neck falls down, and Irendri's soul comes out with the touch of fire. The sarpa sakthi (power of the serpents) tells her that she could gain power with a drop of Priya's blood. So, Irendri takes away Priya and imprisons her. Meanwhile, Yodha turns blind as Sudigundam pierces his eyes. However, Yodha gets saved by a swami (Subbaraya Sarma) and appoints to save a girl named Moksha (Baby Harshitha), who has divine powers. Irendri, to take revenge, attacks Agartha, a village in Anga Rashtram, and makes the children of the village senseless.

Druki (Vallabhaneni Ramji) goes to Pushpagiri to bring Moksha, who could save their children. Druki, Yodha, and Moksha start from Pushpagiri and reach Agartha. At this juncture, the sarpa sakti tells Irendri that Moksha's blood would make her invincible if it was taken by her on lunar eclipse day. So, Irendri sends her men to capture Moksha. But Yodha kills all of them. Irendri again sends Sudigundam, the commander-in-chief, to bring her. Yodha follows them in search of Moksha, finds Priya alive, and saves Moksha and Priya. Moksha brings back Yodha's vision with her divine power. Yodha decides to completely destroy Irendri as she is trying to harm people and succeeds in the climax.

== Cast ==
- Siddharth as Yodha
- Shruti Haasan as Priya
- Lakshmi Manchu as Irendri
- Baby Harshitha as Moksha
- Subbaraya Sharma as Swamy
- Ravi Babu as Sudigundam
- Brahmanandam as Jaffa
- Ali as Jilebi
- Vallabhaneni Ramji as Druki
- Tanikella Bharani as Kakshira
- Hari Teja as Chitra
- Sudarshan as Gundu
- Subba Raju as Dhanaiah
- Ananth as Kulfi
- Gunjan Bakshi as Manju
- P. Ravi Shankar as Narrator

== Production ==
Pre-production for Anaganaga O Dheerudu began in June 2009 and the cast was finalized soon after, with the film creating expectations as it marked the debuts of noted star children Prakash Kovelamudi, Shruti Haasan, and Lakshmi Manchu. Furthermore, the film marked a return to a rare genre in Indian cinema: the fantasy adventure. Shooting began in October 2009 and took place across India, whilst scenes were also shot in Turkey.

During the production stage, Disney agreed to co-produce with Raghavendra Rao's home banner, a Bellyful of Dreams Entertainment, marking the first South Indian production by Disney.

== Soundtrack ==
Anaganaga O Dheerudu

Soundtrack album by Salim–Sulaiman Mickey J. Meyer Koti M. M. Keeravani
- Released: 2011
- Recorded: 2010
- Genre: Soundtrack
- Length: 25:10
- Label: Walt Disney Music

Salim–Sulaiman chronology
Ladies vs Ricky Bahl (2011)	Anaganaga O Dheerudu (2011)	Love Breakups Zindagi (2011)

Mickey J. Meyer chronology
Leader (2010)	Anaganaga O Dheerudu (2011)	Life Is Beautiful (2012)

Koti chronology
Brahmi Gadi Katha (2011)	Anaganaga O Dheerudu (2011)	Raaj (2011)

M. M. Keeravaani chronology
Maryada Ramanna (2010)	Anaganaga O Dheerudu (2011)	Badrinath (2011)

No.	Title	Lyrics	Music	Performer(s)	Length
1.	"Ninnu Choodani"	Chandrabose	M. M. Keeravani	Anuj Gurwara, Chaitra	4:30
2.	"Premalekha"	Chandrabose	Salim–Sulaiman	Salim Merchant, Shreya Ghoshal	4:20
3.	"Pralaya Kaalabelaa"	Vedavyas	Koti	Geetha Madhuri	3:23
4.	"Chandamaamala"	Chandrabose	Mickey J Meyer	Karthik, Sahiti	4:09
5.	"Tharumukosthondi"	Sasi Rajasimha	Koti	S. P. Balasubrahmanyam	2:48
6.	"Premalekha" (remix)	Chandrabose	Salim–Sulaiman	Abhijith	3:58
7.	"Yodha Theme"	Chandrabose	Salim–Sulaiman	Rajiv Sundaran, Rishikesh	2:02
Total length:					25:10

== Release ==
Anaganaga O Dheerudu was released internationally on 14 January 2011 during the Sankranti festival to average reviews and box office collections.

Dubbed versions were created in Tamil and Malayalam, but their release was put on hold indefinitely due to the unexpected failure of the Telugu version. The film is rated PG-13 in North America for "violence and scary images" making it the sixth of ten Disney-branded films to receive the rating.

=== Home media ===
The film was released by Buena Vista Home Entertainment on DVD and digital download on 26 July 2011. The release will be produced in DVD widescreen and include a Telugu language track plus English subtitles.

== Reception ==
Despite its commercial performance, the film was noted for its visual effects and fantasy elements. Lakshmi Manchu’s portrayal of the antagonist Irendri earned her several accolades, including the Nandi Award for Best Villain and the South Indian International Movie Award for Best Actor in a Negative Role – Telugu.

Radhika Rajamani of Rediff.com rated the film 3/5, calling it a "visual extravaganza." While praising the technical aspects of the film like photography, the art direction, the editing, and the computer generated imagery (CGI), she felt that the story had a few loopholes. A reviewer from Sify also rated the same and said: "The film opens on a grand scale, as though it is going to set the standards for a fantasy film, but within a few minutes, the tempo dies, dragging the film into a monotonous drama, making the audiences wait in expectation for something to happen. Frame after frame, the curiosity dies."

== Awards ==
Nandi Awards

- 2011 - Nandi Award for Best Villain - Lakshmi Manchu
- 2011 - Nandi Award for Best Special Effects - Phani Eggone

CineMAA Awards

- 2012 - CineMAA Award for Best Female Debut - Shruti Haasan
- 2012 - CineMAA Award for Best Supporting Actress - Lakshmi Manchu

Filmfare Awards South

- 2012 - Filmfare Award for Best Female Debut – South - Shruti Haasan

Other awards

- Hyderabad Times Film Award for Best Actor in a Negative Role (Female) - Lakshmi Manchu.
- 2012 - SIIMA Award for Best Female Debut (Telugu) - Shruti Haasan
