= 3 (soundtrack) =

3 (Original Motion Picture Soundtrack)
- Soundtrack Cover

Soundtrack album by Anirudh Ravichander
- Released: 23 December 2011
- Recorded: 2011
- Venues: Panchathan Record Inn and AM Studios, Chennai
- Genre: Feature film soundtrack
- Length: 33:26
- Language: Tamil
- Label: Sony Music India
- Producer: Anirudh Ravichander

Anirudh Ravichander chronology
3 (Original Motion Picture Soundtrack) (2011)	Ethir Neechal (2013)

Singles from 3 (Original Motion Picture Soundtrack)
- 1. "Why This Kolaveri Di" Released: 16 November 2011

3 is the debut soundtrack album composed by Anirudh Ravichander, which features lyrics by Vijay, for the 2012 Indian Tamil film of the same name, starring Dhanush and Shruti Hassan, and was directed by Dhanush's wife Aishwaryaa R. Dhanush. The film features seven songs, with three instrumental compositions.

The single track, "Why This Kolaveri Di" was released on 16 November 2011, prior to the soundtrack release, and became one of the most streamed songs of all-time. It was officially released, after a leaked version, becoming popular on the internet. All the songs have lyrics written by Dhanush, except "Idhazhin Oram" was written by Aishwarya Dhanush.

The entire soundtrack album was released on 23 December 2011, and gained positive reviews. Behindwoods.com, listed the soundtrack album of 3, as one of the composer's best works till date. It also fetched the Filmfare Award for Best Music Director for Anirudh Ravichander, and Best Male Playback Singer for Dhanush.

Following the success of the original version, the dubbed versions of the soundtrack was released in Telugu and Hindi, with the lyrics for the Hindi version was written by Kumaar and Telugu version was written by Bhuvanachandra.

== Background ==
According to the composer Anirudh, the film's director Aishwarya R. Dhanush, wanted a light hearted song about love failure, with the former quickly composed the tune within 10 minutes. Dhanush then began working on the lyrics, for about 20 minutes, in which the first line he sang was "Why This Kolaveri?" (transl. Why this murderous rage, Girl?). Dhanush sang the song in broken English, as a Tamil person might if his knowledge of English was limited. The song is also called a 'Soup' song, where 'Soup' is a colloquial Tamil word which refers to young men experiencing love failure after a beautiful relationship.

When I was writing down the lyrics, I kept in mind all the English words that are used in the Tamil vocabulary. Words like I, you, me, how, why, cow. I just framed them into sentences and thats how I came up with the song.

— Dhanush, in an interview with The Times of India, about penning the lyrics for "Why This Kolaveri Di",

== Development ==
All the songs in the film were recorded at A. R. Rahman's AM Studios in Chennai. The song "Why This Kolaveri Di", which was adjusted in downtempo has been built around an ancient south Indian folk rhythm using ancient folk instruments like nadaswaram, shehnai, saxophone, urumee, thavil, drums, acoustic guitar, keyboards mixed with electronic synths and scratches, utilizing the singing style of Tamil folk culture. The words of the song are in a simple form of Tanglish, a mixture of Tamil and English, which strikes a chord with the college students that lap up songs in this genre. The words have been described as "nonsensical" by some and an evocation of "Tamil street humour". Dhanush has stated that the choice of words allows it to be a very relatable song.

The song "Idhazhin Oram" was written by his wife Aishwarya R. Dhanush, while all the other songs were written by Dhanush. The song was sung by Ajesh, a winner of the Airtel Super Singer. Another nominate Sathya Prakash, rended the remix version of "Po Nee Po", the original was sung by Mohit Chauhan, of "Sadda Haq" fame.

== Marketing and release ==
A preliminary version of "Why This Kolaveri Di" was leaked on through the internet, and to counter the leak, the makers released the original version of the number on 16 November 2011, having noticed its popularity. The song became the most searched YouTube video in India, attracting more than 20 million views within 28 days, and was listed by YouTube under the "Recently Most Popular (Gold)" videos.

The soundtrack album was released on 23 December 2011 at the St. George's School, Chennai, under the presence of the film's cast and crew members. Although Rajinikanth and Kamal Haasan were expected to attend the event, only Latha Rajinikanth was present. Dhanush and Anirudh, performed the song "Why This Kolaveri Di" on stage.

== Music video ==
The original music video features Dhanush singing the song at AM studios, accompanied by composer Anirudh on a keyboard, while Shruti Haasan and Aishwarya Dhanush appear in the background. The video was cinematographed by Abinandhan Ramanujam. The video of the song, was filmed in a set made to replicate the crowded shopping street of Chennai Marina beach. It featured Dhanush and Sunder Ramu along with other extras singing the song, while Shruti Haasan makes an appearance towards the end of the video.

The music video of "Idhazhin Oram" featured Dhanush, Sivakarthikeyan and Shruti Haasan, picturising their school life love stories. The song "Kannazhaga" features an intense romantic sequence between the lead pair. The song "Come on Girls" was picturised in a pub, where Dhanush and Shruti Haasan seen dancing, along with Sunder Ramu and Sivakarthikeyan. "Nee Paartha Vizhigal" is picturised upon Dhanush and Shruti as they live their life after marriage. The song "Po Nee Po" was picturised upon Dhanush as he is suffering from bipolar disorder in the film.

== Release history ==
The original version of the soundtrack was released on 23 December 2011, whereas the single "Why This Kolaveri Di" was released prior to the soundtrack on 16 November 2011. After the soundtrack's success in Tamil, the album was dubbed in Telugu and released on 9 March 2012. The Hindi version of the album was released on 15 April 2012.

== Chart performance ==
The songs received predominantly positive reviews from all corners. Upon release of the single "Why This Kolaveri Di" the hashtag #kolaveri topped the Indian trends in Twitter on the evening of 21 November 2011. Within a week of the official release of the video, it received more than 3.5 million views on YouTube, more than 1 million shares on Facebook, while trending in India on Twitter the whole time. The song is also a hit among non-Tamils, apparently due to the Tanglish lyrics. The song and versions of it account for more than 200 million of YouTube's total views. The song became the top downloaded song on mobile with 4,100,000 downloads within the first 18 days of release. On 24 November 2011, the song became the first Tamil film song to premier on MTV India. Following its huge success and nationwide popularity Dhanush, the singer of the original track was invited by then Prime Minister Dr. Manmohan Singh as a "Guest of Honour". The songs including "Kolaveri Di" topped at iTunes charts and all the FM stations. The album also had a record number of sales and digital downloads.

== Reception ==
Kaushik LM, of Behindwoods rated the soundtrack album 3.5 out of 5, summarising "Anirudh Ravichander has delivered so much variety in his very first album. Such a promising debut by a composer hasn't been seen in recent Tamil cinema history. 'Kolaveri' took the initial honors but there are so many other melodic treats that 3 offers. On the whole, an album that will sell like hot cakes." Rediff rated the album 3 out of 5, and summarised that "All the songs in 3 are good and come with appealing instrumental arrangements, even if the lyrics are a bit bland. Composer Anirudh has obviously taken pains to come up with an intriguing collection." Moviecrow rated the album 7 out of 10, stating with a bottomline that "This dream debut by Anirudh is mighty impressive. The director Aishwarya D should be commended for her vision. She has given Anirudh and Dhanush the freedom to explore in music and lyrics. Anirudh has proven that 'Kolaveri' was no fluke. The music is fresh, experimental and delightful - worth buying." Indiaglitz gave a positive review stating "The entire album of '3', which explores the various faces and phases of love, is a bonanza to music lovers. No other film in the recent past celebrated love with these many songs."

== Controversy ==
The song, "Why This Kolaveri Di" being one of the most streamed Indian songs, gained controversy upon its release. Javed Akhtar, a poet, lyricist and scriptwriter slammed the song for its insult to sensibility. In April 2012, a petition was filed in the Kerala High Court seeking a ban on the song citing negative influence on children, claiming to inciting violence and aggression. The song also faced criticism for its allegedly misogynistic lyrics.

== Track listing ==
=== Tamil ===
All lyrics are written by Dhanush, except "Idhazhin Oram" was written by Aishwarya Dhanush.

No.	Title	Singer(s)	Length
1.	"Idhazhin Oram – The Innocence of Love"	Ajesh, Anirudh Ravichander	3:25
2.	"Kannazhaga - The Kiss of Love"	Dhanush, Shruti Haasan	3:26
3.	"Come on Girls – The Celebration of Love"	Anirudh Ravichander, Nadisha Thomas, Maalavika Manoj	2:54
4.	"Nee Paartha Vizhigal – The Touch of Love"	Vijay Yesudas, Shweta Mohan	4:24
5.	"A Life Full of Love – Theme Music"	Instrumental: Anirudh Ravichander	1:55
6.	"Why This Kolaveri Di"	Dhanush	4:20
7.	"The Rhythm of Love – Theme Music"	Instrumental: Navin Iyer	1:14
8.	"Po Nee Po – The Pain of Love"	Mohit Chauhan, Anirudh Ravichander	4:11
9.	"Theme of 3"	Mandolin Seenu	1:29
10.	"Po Nee Po Remix – The Scream of Love"	Sathya Prakash, Harish Swaminathan	3:42

=== Telugu (Dubbed Version) ===
All lyrics are written by Bhuvanachandra.

No.	Title	Singer(s)	Length
1.	"Yedhalo Oka Mounam – The Innocence of Love"	Ajesh Ashok, Anirudh Ravichander	3:27
2.	"Kannulada - The Kiss of Love"	Dhanush, Shruti Haasan	3:26
3.	"Come on Girls – The Celebration of Love"	Anirudh Ravichander, Ananth	2:55
4.	"Nee Paata Madhuram – The Touch of Love"	Roop Kumar Rathod, Shreya Ghoshal	4:23
5.	"A Life Full of Love – Theme Music"	Instrumental: Anirudh Ravichander	1:55
6.	"Why This Kolaveri Di"	Dhanush	4:20
7.	"The Rhythm of Love – Theme Music"	Instrumental: Navin Iyer	1:14
8.	"Po Ve Po – The Pain of Love"	Mohit Chauhan, Anirudh Ravichander	4:14
9.	"Theme of 3"	Mandolin Seenu	1:29
10.	"Po Ve Po Remix – The Scream of Love"	Sathya Prakash, Harish Swaminathan	3:42

=== Hindi (Dubbed Version) ===
All lyrics are written by Kumaar.

No.	Title	Singer(s)	Length
1.	"Tere Bin – The Innocence of Love"	Adnan Sami, Anirudh Ravichander	3:21
2.	"Tan Ye Mera - The Kiss of Love"	Ajesh Ashok, Shruti Haasan	3:23
3.	"Come on Girls – The Celebration of Love"	Anirudh Ravichander, Ananth	2:55
4.	"Ai Raat Dheere Chal – The Touch of Love"	Shreya Ghoshal, Roop Kumar Rathod	4:27
5.	"Instrumental: A Life Full of Love – Theme Music"	Anirudh Ravichander	1:55
6.	"Why This Kolaveri Di"	Dhanush	4:20
7.	"The Rhythm of Love – Theme Music"	Instrumental: Navin Iyer	1:14
8.	"Ro Ne Do – The Pain of Love"	Mohit Chauhan, Anirudh Ravichander	4:11
9.	"Theme of 3"	Mandolin Seenu	1:29
10.	"Ro Ne Do Remix – The Scream of Love"	Vishal Dadlani, Harish Swaminathan, Anirudh Ravichander	3:42
