= Arya 2 =

2009 Indian film by Sukumar

Arya
- Theatrical release poster
- Directed by: Sukumar
- Screenplay by: T. Prakash; Chandrasekhar T. Ramesh
- Story by: Sukumar
- Dialogues by: Vema Reddy
- Produced by: Aditya Babu; B. V. S. N. Prasad
- Starring: Allu Arjun; Kajal Aggarwal; Navdeep
- Cinematography: B. Rajasekar
- Edited by: Marthand K. Venkatesh
- Music by: Devi Sri Prasad
- Production company: Aditya Arts
- Distributed by: Viacom18 Studios
- Release date: 27 November 2009
- Running time: 165 minutes
- Country: India
- Language: Telugu

Arya 2 is a 2009 Indian Telugu-language psychological romantic comedy action film co-written and directed by Sukumar. Produced by Aditya Babu and B. V. S. N. Prasad under the Aditya Arts banner, the film stars Allu Arjun in the titular role, alongside Kajal Aggarwal and Navdeep with music composed by Devi Sri Prasad. It serves as a spiritual sequel to Arya (2004). The film explores the complex love-hate relationship between two childhood friends, Arya and Ajay, and their mutual love for Geetha, set against a backdrop of corporate and family conflicts.

Arya 2 was released theatrically on 27 November 2009 to mixed reviews. The film collected a distributor's share of ₹12 crore, emerging as an average to an above average success at the box office. The film was later dubbed into Malayalam with the same title, and released across Kerala on 5 February 2010 with 100 prints and was successful in the state. The film was re-released on April 5, 2025 on the occasion of Arjun's birthday.

== Plot ==
At an orphanage, two young boys, Arya and Ajay, form a complex and asymmetrical bond. Arya aggressively forces a friendship onto Ajay, who secretly develops a deep-seated resentment toward him. When a wealthy family arrives wishing to adopt only one child, the selection is determined by a coin toss; Arya deliberately yields the win, allowing Ajay to be adopted. Years later, Ajay grows up to become a highly successful corporate executive, whereas Arya develops into a dangerous, unstable psychopath. When a group of thugs ambushes Ajay, Arya brutally intervenes and mutilates the attackers using stolen surgical instruments, resulting in his arrest. Out of a sense of obligation, Ajay bails him out, but Arya's subsequent reckless driving causes a severe car accident. Exploiting the situation, Arya demands a job at Ajay's firm in exchange for his life. Ajay reluctantly concedes on the condition that Arya transforms into a refined, hardworking professional.

Arya surprisingly adapts to the corporate environment, earning the genuine respect of his colleagues through sheer diligence. While a co-worker named Santhi develops unrequited feelings for him, Arya firmly rejects her advances. The status quo shatters when both Ajay and Arya fall in love with Geetha, a new employee. While Ajay suppresses his affection, Arya impulsively forces a kiss upon her, causing her immense distress. Unable to expose his obsessive behavioral patterns to the corporate board, Geetha cleverly manipulates Arya into a public confession of love before immediately declaring her romantic preference for Ajay, hoping to permanently alienate Arya. However, a jealous Ajay, fully aware of Geetha's superficial motives, frames Arya for a staged automobile accident to eliminate him as a romantic rival.

Discovering their apparent mutual affection, a repentant Arya reverses his stance and resolves to unite Ajay and Geetha. The situation complicates when Geetha’s factional, violent family arranges her forced marriage to settle a bloody gang feud. Arya travels to her ancestral village, disrupts the wedding ceremony, and rescues her from a massive brawl. To ensure her legal safety, Arya marries Geetha himself, though he secretly intends to hand her over to Ajay once the danger passes. During their forced proximity, Arya develops a profound, genuine emotional attachment to her.

Upon returning to the city, Arya discovers that Geetha’s powerful father, Raji Reddy, has read his personal diary, uncovering the elopement plot. Arya races to intercept Raji Reddy's henchmen, saving Ajay from execution by forcing a rival gang leader, Kasi Reddy, to take Geetha hostage as leverage. While guarding her, Arya strikes up an unexpected, emotional rapport with Kasi Reddy’s son, Subbi, who confesses his own decade-long unrequited love for Geetha. Overwhelmed by the crushing agony of his impending sacrifice, Arya breaks down in tears. Recognizing the unparalleled purity and depth of Arya's devotion, an empathetic Subbi agrees to help him.

Arya secures fraudulent passports for Ajay and Geetha to flee the country, requesting just one final day of companionship because he feels they have never viewed him as a true friend. Sensing his profound inner torment, Geetha gradually falls in love with Arya. Sensing her shift in allegiance, a suspicious Ajay covertly alters their flight destination to Australia to permanently cut Arya out of their lives. Arya discovers the deception during a quiet conversation with Geetha. Worried for his safety should her family discover his complicity, Geetha questions his motives; Arya responds that he is entirely willing to die for her happiness, cementing her realization of his absolute selflessness.

Before boarding, a guilt-ridden Geetha confesses to Ajay that she intentionally alerted her father to their whereabouts to prevent Arya from facing the fatal consequences of their actions. Raji Reddy and his faction violently ambush them. Chaos ensues as Arya throws himself into the fray to shield Ajay from a lethal blade, sustaining a critical stab wound. Witnessing Arya's willingness to bleed for a man who despised him and a woman who rejected him, both Ajay and Geetha experience a profound epiphany regarding the depth of his love and loyalty.

At the hospital, a remorseful Ajay promises to finally be a genuine friend to Arya. Seizing a final moment of psychological manipulation, a recovering Arya asks Ajay to press a nearby wall switch. Unaware that the button deactivates his primary medical oxygen supply, Ajay complies. Arya suffocates temporarily, prompting an arriving Geetha to assume Ajay attempted murder; she slaps Ajay in a fury. In private, a smirking Arya quietly apologizes to Ajay, who finally accepts defeat and smiles, recognizing the absolute, terrifying genius of Arya's devotion. The narrative concludes with Ajay gracefully stepping aside, leaving Arya and Geetha to embrace their new life together.

== Cast ==
- Allu Arjun as Arya
- Kajal Aggarwal as Geetha
- Navdeep as Ajay
- Mukesh Rishi as Raji Reddy, Geetha's father (voice dubbed by P Ravi Shankar)
- Shraddha Das as Shanti
- Ajay as Subbi Reddy
- Brahmanandam as Dasavatharam, Ajay's secretary
- Sayaji Shinde as Kasi Reddy, Subbi Reddy's father
- Radha Kumari as Raji Reddy's mother
- Venu Madhav
- Srinivasa Reddy As Cameo
- Krishnudu
- Devi Charan
- Erina Andriana in item number "Ringa Ringa”

== Music ==
Arya 2

Soundtrack album by Devi Sri Prasad
- Released: November 1, 2009, Rock Heights, Madhapur, Hyderabad
- Recorded: 2009
- Genre: Soundtrack
- Length: 39:17
- Language: Telugu
- Label: Sony Music
- Producer: Devi Sri Prasad

Devi Sri Prasad chronology
Kanthaswamy (2009)	Arya 2 (2009)	Adhurs (2010)

The soundtrack and background score were composed by Devi Sri Prasad. The music was released on 1 November 2009 at Rock Heights, Madhapur, Hyderabad. The audio rights of the soundtrack were purchased by Sony Music India. It was also recorded in Malayalam and Hindi. The tracks "Ringa Ringa", "Uppenantha Prema" and "My Love Is Gone" topped the music charts. The song "Ringa Ringa" received a cult status. The music of the song was re-used by Devi Sri Prasad in the Salman Khan's film, Ready as "Dhinka Chika", and it was also re-used in Kannada movie 5 Idiots.

Following the internet phenomenon of "Why This Kolaveri Di" in 2011, "Ringa Ringa" was featured alongside "Oh Podu", "Appadi Podu" and "Naaka Mukka" in a small collection of South Indian songs that are considered a "national rage" in India.

=== Telugu Track list ===
All music is composed by Devi Sri Prasad.

No.	Title	Lyrics	Singer(s)	Length
1.	"Mr. Perfect"	Kedar	Baba Sehgal, Devi Sri Prasad, Rita	4:37
2.	"Uppenantha"	Balaji	KK	5:27
3.	"Baby He Loves You"	Chandrabose	Devi Sri Prasad	5:21
4.	"Ringa Ringa"	Chandrabose	Priya Hemesh	5:33
5.	"Karige Loga"	Vanamali	Kunal Ganjawala & Megha	6:03
6.	"My Love Is Gone"	Chandrabose	K.G. Ranjith	4:48
7.	"Karige Loga (D-Plugged)"	Vanamali	Sagar	2:54
8.	"Mr.Perfect (DSP Mix)"	Kedar	Devi Sri Prasad	4:16
Total length:				39:00

=== Malayalam Track list ===
All lyrics are written by Siju Thuravoor.

No.	Title	Singer(s)	Length
1.	"Mr. Perfect"	Anwar Sadath, Devi Sri Prasad, Chorus	4:38
2.	"Chendu Mallika"	Vijay Yesudas	5:29
3.	"Mohajaalakam (Baby He Loves You)"	Vidhu Prathap	5:23
4.	"Ringa Ringa"	Malgudi Subha	5:35
5.	"Kai Neettunnu"	Jobi, Megha	6:05
6.	"My Love Is Gone"	Alex Kayyalaykkal	4:50

== Reception ==
=== Critical reception ===
Jeevi of Idlebrain.com rated the film three out of five and wrote, "On a whole, Arya 2 is a different film that can appeal to A centers and class crowds". Rediff.com rated the film two out of five stars stating, "It's only the first half of the film which makes for interesting viewing, otherwise the film is the usual routine stuff interspersed with some good dances and slick technical work".

== Release ==
Arya 2 was released on 27 November 2009. It was also dubbed in Malayalam under the same title, in Odia as I Love You Geeta, in Hindi as Arya: Ek Deewana (2010), and was remade under the title Ami Shudhu Cheyechi Tomay in Bengali.

Arya 2 was re-released on 5 April 2025.

=== Box office ===
The film grossed ₹25 crore (US$2.6 million) in its first week, including ₹18 crore (US$1.9 million) from Nizam area. However the film was affected when its screening was halted in Telangana region due to Telangana Agitation.

== Accolades ==
57th Filmfare Awards South

Won

- Filmfare Award for Best Female Playback Singer – Telugu - Priya Hemesh - "Ringa Ringa"
- Filmfare Award for Best Choreography – South - Prem Rakshith - "Mr. Perfect" song

Nomination

- Best Film
- Best Director - Sukumar
- Best Actor - Allu Arjun
- Best Music Director - Devi Sri Prasad
- Best Male Playback - Baba Sehgal - "Mr. Perfect"
- Best Lyricist - Vanamali - "Karigeloga Jeevitam"
