= Rajinikanth (disambiguation) =

Wikimedia disambiguation page

Rajinikanth may refer to:

- Aishwarya Rajinikanth (born 1982) Indian film director
- Anbulla Rajinikanth 1984 Indian Tamil-language children's drama film
