= Genes season 3 =

Genes
- Season 3
- Logo

Release
- Original network: Zee Tamil
- Original release: 17 June 2018 – 4 July 2021

Season chronology
- ← Previous; Season 2

Genes (season 3) is a 2018 Indian Tamil-language game show telecast on Zee Tamil. The third season of the Genes game show was launched on 17 June 2018. The show is currently hosted by Priya Raman replacing fellow actress Roja who previously hosted the first two editions of the game show. Priya Raman has been hired as the presenter of the third season of Genes game show while she was shooting for the Zee Tamizh TV series Sembaruthi.

== Rules ==
The third season similar to that of the Genes season 2 has four interesting rounds 1+1=3, Yaar Indha Star?, Anniyan and Vai Raaja Vai. The participants will be presented with a basic cash prize of 100,000 just prior to the beginning of the round one which would be either get reduced or multiplied relying upon the performance of the contestants in each level.

== Guests included ==
Episode	Guest(s)	Amount won
1 (17 June 2018)	Robo Shankar	
2 (24 June 2018)	Namitha & Veerendra Chowdary	
3 (1 July 2018)	Power Star Srinivasan	
4 (8 July 2018)	Oorvambu Lakshmi & Shabanaa	
5 (15 July 2018)	Delhi Ganesh	
6 (22 July 2018)	Sathish & RJ Nandhini	
7 (29 July 2018)	"Rockstar" Ramani Ammal & Siddharth Vipin	
8 (5 August 2018)	Dinesh & Reshma	
9 (12 August 2018)	Kavin & Arunraja Kamaraj	
10 (19 August 2018)	Harish Kalyan & Raiza Wilson	
11 (26 August 2018)	Nachathira & Chaitra Reddy	
12 (2 September 2018)	Jangiri Madhumitha & George	
13 (9 September 2018)	VJ Kathirvel and VJ Madhan	
14 (16 September 2018)	Swaminathan and Devadarshini	
15 (23 September 2018)	VJ Archana Chandhoke, Anitha (Archana's sister), and Zaara (Archana's daughter)	
16 (30 September 2018)	VJ Kamal and VJ Maheshwari	
17 (7 October 2018)	Krishna and Vidya Pradeep	
18 (14 October 2018)	Ashwini and Vasanth	
19 (21 October 2018)	Kousalya Senthamarai and Diwakar	
20 (4 November 2018)	Pyramid Natarajan and L. Raja	
21 (11 November 2018)	Siddarth and Sameera Sherief	
22 (18 November 2018)	R. K. Suresh	
23 (25 November 2018)	Munish Rajan and Darsha Guptha	
24 (2 December 2018)	Sathya Sai, Puviarasu and Subbalakshmi Ranjan	
25 (9 December 2018)	Neelima Rani and Vishnupriya	
26 (16 December 2018)	Narasimha Raju and Sanjay Asrani	
27 (23 December 2018)	Suja Varunee and Shiv	
28 (30 December 2018)	Yamuna Chinnadhurai and Fathima Babu	
29 (6 January 2019)	Krithika Laddu and Dhanalakshmi	
30 (13 January 2019)	"Valli"Mounika and Bharatha Naidu	
31 (20 January 2019)	Cool Suresh and Ponnambalam	
32 (27 January 2019)	Arvind Khathare and Minnal Deepa	
33 (3 February 2019)	Farina Azad and Shashikala Nagarajan	
34 (10 February 2019)	Azhagappan and Raghavendiran	
35 (17 February 2019)	Deepak Dinkar and his son	
36 (24 February 2019)	Ganesh and Harathi Ganesh	
37 (3 March 2019)	Eshwar Raghunathan Jayashree and Rethva	
38 (10 March 2019)	Subathira and Saira Banu	
39 (17 March 2019)	Nisha and Ashwin Karthik	
40 (24 March 2019)	Ayesha and Vishnu	
41 (7 April 2019)	Lisha and Ashwanth Ashokkumar	
42(21 April 2019)	Ranjith and Vasu Vikram	
43(28 April 2019)	GV Prakash and AL Vijay	
44(5 May 2019)	Bindu Aneesh and Swathi	
