= Ethir Neechal =

Ethir Neechal (alternatively Ethirneechal, Edhirneechal or Edhir Neechal, lit. 'swimming against' in Tamil) may refer to these Indian films or TV series:

- Edhir Neechal (1968 film)
- Ethir Neechal (2013 film)
  - Ethir Neechal (soundtrack), of the 2013 film
- Ethirneechal (TV series)
