= Rendu =

- DVD cover
- Directed by: Sundar C
- Written by: Velam C. Manohar (dialogues)
- Screenplay by: Sundar C Subha
- Story by: Sundar C
- Produced by: Khushbu Sundar
- Starring: Madhavan; Reema Sen; Anushka Shetty
- Cinematography: Prasad Murella
- Edited by: Kasi Viswanathan
- Music by: D. Imman
- Production company: Avni Cinemax
- Distributed by: Aascar Film Pvt. Ltd
- Release date: 24 November 2006
- Running time: 146 minutes
- Country: India
- Language: Tamil

Rendu, also known as Irandu (transl. Two) is a 2006 Indian Tamil-language action comedy film directed by Sundar C and produced by Khushbu Sundar. The film stars Madhavan in dual roles, with Reema Sen and Anushka Shetty as the lead actresses. Vadivelu, Santhanam and Bhagyaraj also appear in supporting roles alongside a large ensemble cast. Rendu, which featured music composed by D. Imman, was released on 24 November 2006. It marks the debut of Shetty in Tamil cinema.

== Plot ==
Shakti is a young man from a village with no job but much ambition and dreams. As he sees his life pass him by, stuck in a rut in his hometown, he decides that he will try his fortunes elsewhere. He goes off to Chennai to join his uncle Kirikalan, who has a stall of magic tricks at an exhibition. However, Kirikalan merely poses as a magician, and his amateurish tricks do not bring in big crowds. Next door to Shakti and Kirikalan's stall is one ever-populated with visitors. It is an all-girls stand with mermaid costumes as the theme. Velli is the "head mermaid" at the stall, run by her sister. Bitter quarrels between Velli and Shakti ensue when he feels that she and her team are unfairly taking their customers away, and she has an impression of him being an unsavory character. However, love has been brewing as an undercurrent between them.

Meanwhile, the exhibition grounds owner keeps harassing Velli under some pretext or the other. He has a soft spot for her but is thoroughly rejected by her. He finally abducts her, but Shakti rescues her. Similarly, Velli's plight is repeated when her betrothed suitor enters the scene and tries to force her to be with him, and Shakti steps in once again to save and protect Velli. The undercurrents of love blow up into a full-fledged torrent, and Velli and Shakti make up for all of their lost time professing their love for each other and romancing their way happily through the exhibition.

Meanwhile, a series of murders in different towns of the state and two perpetrators of these crimes slinking away from each are shown. At one crime scene, a witness spots the main culprit. Going through various fact files, the police comes across the incident of a bad fire at a marriage hall in Kumbakonam, and as the investigating officer flips through the picture files of the deceased. Shakti's face is shown, and the witness jumps. He then points to a photo of Kannan, Shakti's doppelganger, and tells the police that Kannan is the main murderer. Investigations into the murder lead the police to Chennai. As luck would have it, Shakti is spotted, recognised, and arrested. Kannan, on the other hand, follows the murder investigation and is upset to find that an innocent man has been captured for crimes he has committed. He meets Kirikalan and Velli and plots to help Shakti get out. He does so and escapes with Shakti. After much chase-and-hide, Kannan tells the story of what led him to murder everyone.

Kannan, his elder brother Ganesh, and his father were renowned caterers and were commissioned to cook for a marriage function in Kumbakonam. The host was Kannan's father's friend, and this gentleman's daughter Manjula was going to be married in a joyous ceremony. There, Kannan meets Jothi and instantly falls in love with her. At first he panics that Jothi is the bride at the function but is vastly relieved when he finds out she is not. Jothi likes Kannan as well. However, the groom's family creates trouble at the wedding and walks out, leaving the family distraught and desperate. Suddenly, Kannan suggests to his father that Ganesh marry Manjula, and the idea comes to plan. Unfortunately, all hell breaks loose, and a raging fire attacks the marriage house. Manjula's father, a dignitary in Kumbakonam, learns that some powerful thugs and gang leaders have sold a large piece of government property to a north Indian landlord, completely illegally at exorbitant prices, with no gain for the townspeople themselves. He strongly opposes them, and all their mischief comes to public notice and foils their plans. The villains want his blood as revenge. They set fire to the building of the wedding and kill every single inmate inside, but Kannan and his friend Seenu manage to escape.

Kannan, whose light eyes are a result of the fire (he walks with help and not very clear sight), is heartbroken and devastated at the loss of his entire family and lady love at what was to be a happy occasion. He vows retribution on the villains and sets about cold-bloodedly fulfilling this. Shakti decides to help Kannan achieve his revenge with the help of Velli and Kirikalan. At the end, Kannan sacrifices his life to kill the main villain Rakesh by jumping on the lava along with him. He reunites with his family and lady love in heaven.

== Cast ==
- Madhavan in a dual role as Shakthi and Kannan
- Reema Sen as Velli
- Anushka Shetty as Jothi
- Vadivelu as Kirikalan
- K. Bhagyaraj as CBI Officer
- Manivannan as Exhibition Grounds owner
- Santhanam as Seenu
- Nikita Palekar as Manjula
- Shyam Ganesh as Ganesh
- Mayilswamy as Thief
- Madhan Bob as Eyewitness
- Bala Singh as Rathnasamy
- Hariraj as Rakesh
- Kumaresan as Auto Driver
- Devadarshini as Devi, Kannan's sister
- A. C. Murali Mohan as Kannan's brother-in-law
- Neelu as Kannan's grandfather
- Raviprakash as Jothi's father
- Thambi Ramaiah as Velli's father
- Tharika as Velli's sister
- Crane Manohar as Man who irritates Kirikalan at temple
- Bayilvan Ranganathan as magic show audience
- V. M. Subburaj as magic show audience
- Amarasigamani as Wedding Guest
- Kritheeka
- Bonda Mani as Kirikalan's assistant
- Chelladurai
- Nellai Siva
- Halwa Vasu

== Production ==
Anushka Shetty was signed on to make her first appearance in Tamil films. Hariraj, who had made his debut as a lead actor in Valli (1993), made a comeback as an antagonist through the project. The film was predominantly shot in Chennai, with a small portion of the flashback shot in Karaikudi. A set resembling Courtallam was put up by art director Jana at Island Garden in Chennai, with twenty truckloads of water used for the scene.

== Soundtrack ==
The soundtrack album was composed by D. Imman.

Track listing
No.	Title	Lyrics	Singer(s)	Length
1.	"Kurai Onrumillai"	Thabu Shankar	Adharsh, Janani Madhan (Jey)	04:06
2.	"Mobila Mobila"	Thabu Shankar	D. Imman, Maya	04:44
3.	"Nee En Thozhiya"	Thabu Shankar	Naresh Iyer, Sujatha	04:42
4.	"Varta Varta Varta"	Thabu Shankar	Adharsh, Lavanya	04:48
5.	"Yaaro Evalo"	P. Vijay	Ranjith	04:49
Total length:				23:09

== Release and reception ==
Sify labelled the film as "corny but unpretentious and adequate time pass for an unfussy viewer", adding that "the charisma of Madhavan that makes the film watchable" and that "he looks good and proves his mettle for comedy and with Vadivelu the combo runs riot". In contrast, Rediff.com gave the film a negative review stating the venture was "too dumb to watch" and that "since most of the stars in the movie seemed to be adlibbing, one wonders what exactly was directed by Sundar C." Lajjavathi of Kalki wrote it has become fun to watch the films of Sundar C, this film too proves it. Soon after the film's release, the team renamed the project as Irandu in order to gain tax exemptions as the government had considered Rendu to be colloquial.
