= Ghilli =

2004 Indian Tamil film by Dharani

- Theatrical release poster
- Directed by: Dharani
- Screenplay by: Dharani
- Dialogues by: Bharathan
- Story by: Gunasekhar
- Based on: Okkadu (Telugu) by Gunasekhar
- Produced by: A. M. Rathnam
- Starring: Vijay; Trisha; Prakash Raj; Ashish Vidyarthi
- Cinematography: S. Gopinath
- Edited by: B. Lenin; V. T. Vijayan
- Music by: Vidyasagar
- Production company: Sri Surya Movies
- Release date: 17 April 2004
- Running time: 164 minutes
- Country: India
- Language: Tamil
- Budget: ₹8 crore
- Box office: ₹42 to 50 crore (initial run) ₹30–38.50 crore (re-release) (Note: Ghilli's reported worldwide grosses vary between 35crore (Hindustan Times) – ₹38.50 crore ( News18 Tamil) – ₹25 crore (Times Now) – ₹30.50 crore (India Today))

Ghilli (Note: Spelt as Ghillie on the CBFC certificate.) (/ɡɪllɪ/ transl. Gutsy) is a 2004 Indian Tamil-language sports action film directed by Dharani and produced by A. M. Rathnam. It is a remake of the Telugu film Okkadu (2003), written and directed by Gunasekhar, with few changes made to the story. The film stars Vijay in the lead role, alongside Trisha and Prakash Raj (reprising his role from the original version). Ashish Vidyarthi, Dhamu, Mayilsamy, Janaki Sabesh, Nancy Jennifer, Nagendra Prasad, Ponnambalam and Pandu play supporting roles. The film is about a Kabaddi player, who goes to Madurai to participate in an exhibition match, but instead rescues a woman from a gang leader, who wants to marry her.

The soundtrack album and score were composed by Vidyasagar, while cinematography was handled by Gopinath and editing by V. T. Vijayan and B. Lenin. The dialogues for the film were written by Bharathan. The film was released on 16 April 2004 to positive reviews from critics. The film ran for more than 200 days at the Tamil Nadu box office and emerged as the highest-grossing Tamil film of 2004. Ghilli is considered to be one of the best films in Vijay's career, starting his acting trend from romance to action cult following

A re-mastered version in 4K was re-released in theatres on 20 April 2024 and received huge response among the audience. It grossed around ₹26–32.50 crore during its re-release, becoming the highest grossing re-release in India overtaking Titanic. This record was later broken by Hindi film Tumbbad in September 2024. (Note: Multiple references)

== Plot ==
Saravanavelu "Velu" is a state-level Kabaddi player living in Chennai with his family. He is constantly rebuked by his father, DCP Sivasubramaniam for neglecting his education and favouring Kabaddi, while his mother Janaki dotes on him. Velu's younger sister Bhuvana "Bhuvi", a sharp and inquisitive schoolgirl, constantly gets Velu into trouble with their father, but she adores him. One day, Velu is sent to his relative's wedding in Trichy, but he secretly skips the wedding to play a Kabaddi match in Madurai for his Kabaddi team named Ghilli.

Muthupandi, a charismatic gang leader in Madurai, desires to marry a girl named Dhanalakshmi and kills Dhanalakshmi's older brother as he rejects Muthupandi's proposal to marry her. Dhanalakshmi's second brother is also killed by Muthupandi when attempting to avenge his brother's murder. Dhanalakshmi's father gets terrified by Muthupandi's acts and asks Dhanalakshmi to leave Madurai and lead a peaceful life with her uncle in the United States, giving her money and her university certificates. Muthupandi catches Dhanalakshmi while she is attempting to escape. However, while preparing for a Kabaddi match in Madurai, Velu sees Dhanalakshmi and rescues her by thrashing Muthupandi and taking her to Chennai.

Velu takes Dhanalakshmi to his house and hides her in his room without his family's knowledge. Meanwhile, Muthupandi and his father Home Minister Rajapandi ask Sivasubramaniam to search for Dhanalakshmi and the apparent kidnapper. Velu soon arranges a passport and flight tickets for Dhanalakshmi, who begins to fall for Velu. When Sivasubramaniam discovers that his son is the apparent kidnapper, Velu and Dhanalakshmi escape from Sivasubramaniam and hide in the lighthouse. Velu, along with his friends, reaches the airport in time for Dhanalakshmi's flight before their Kabaddi match against Punjab in the final match of the National League. Sivasubramaniam is enraged that Velu is playing in the Kabaddi match despite being a wanted criminal, where he goes to the stadium to arrest Velu, but decides to arrest him after the Kabaddi match upon Bhuvana's request.

Velu realises that he has fallen in love with Dhanalakshmi and begins to miss her, only to spot her in the stadium during the match. Velu's lack of focus in the game is quickly replaced by his best upon seeing Dhanalakshmi, which ultimately helps his team win the championship. Later, Velu is arrested by his father, but is then stopped by Muthupandi, who wants to fight Velu after having been incited by Dhanalakshmi to prove his worth. At first, Muthupandi subdues Velu but he regains his strength, defeats Muthupandi and embraces Dhanalakshmi. Muthupandi regains consciousness and tries to kill Velu with an aruval, but a floodlight, broken during the fight, touches the aruval, electrocuting Muthupandi to death.

== Cast ==
- Vijay as Saravanavelu aka "Velu" / Ghilli
- Trisha as S. Dhanalakshmi
- Prakash Raj as Muthupandi
- Ashish Vidyarthi as DCP Sivasubramaniam IPS, Velu's father
- Tanikella Bharani as Minister Rajapandi
- Janaki Sabesh as Janaki, Velu's mother
- Jennifer as Bhuvana "Bhuvi", Velu's sister
- Nagendra Prasad as Velu's sidekick
- Dhamu as Otteri Nari, Velu's sidekick
- Maran as Velu's teammate
- Aadukalam Murugadoss as Aadhivasi, Velu's sidekick
- Chaplin Balu as Velu's teammate
- Mayilsamy as Narayana
- Ponnambalam as Inspector Arivazhagan
- Pandu as Police Inspector
- Vinod Raj as Shankarapandi, Dhanalakshmi's father
- T. K. Kala as Muthupandi's mother
- Brahmanandam as Ramakrishna, a priest
- Nandha Saravanan as Raju, Tiger team captain
- Karate Raja as Muthupandi's henchman
- Saai Sundar as Raghu, Dhanalakshmi's second brother
- Priyanka as a shopkeeper
- Pondy Ravi as a police officer
- Suruli Manohar as Minister Rajapandi's PA
- Muthalvan Saran as an audience member during a cricket match
- Arpitha as Bhuvana's friend
- Swetha Bharathi as Bhuvana's friend
- Divya Priya as Bhuvana's friend
- Deepika as Bhuvana's friend

Uncredited

- Vimal as Velu's teammate
- Appukutty as Ramakrishna's assistant
- Pandi as Roadside vendor
- Shobi as a dancer in "Kokkarakko"
- Siva

== Production ==
=== Development ===
After completing Dhool (2003), Dharani watched Okkadu and felt it had elements of a story idea "based on a kabaddi player, another storyline on a romance between a guy who hid his girl in a lighthouse, and another road film idea" which he thought of, he requested A.M. Rathnam to procure the remake rights. Dharani made changes to the screenplay adding elements different from the original. A major change was changing the father of the kabaddi player to disapprove of his son playing kabaddi. Dharani's regular crew members including cinematographer Gopinath and composer Vidyasagar joined the film, while Rocky Rajesh and Raju Sundaram were chosen to choreograph the stunts and dances, respectively, for which Sundaram was awarded Filmfare Award for Best Dance Choreographer – South later.

=== Casting ===
Vikram and Jyothika were the first choice to play the lead roles. Due to other commitments, they were replaced by Vijay and Trisha. Ajith Kumar was also considered for the lead role but he was hesitant to do a Telugu remake. Vincent Asokan was initially supposed to play Prakash Raj's role as the antagonist from the original but Prakash Raj ended up reprising his role. Thiagarajan's refusal to play Vijay's father meant that Ashish Vidyarthi was cast as in that role. Playback singer T. K. Kala made her acting debut with this film. Vimal who went on to act in films like Pasanga (2009) and Kalavani (2010) appeared in a small role as one of Vijay's teammates and also worked as "unofficial" assistant director.

=== Filming ===
Filming took place mainly in and around Chennai, surrounding the areas like Mylapore and Besant Nagar and also at the cities of Rayagada in Odisha and Araku Valley and Simhachalam in Andhra Pradesh. The scene in which Vijay, his coach and his friends arrive to Madurai Junction from Chennai, was shot actually in Visakhapatnam Railway Station to avoid crowd and confusion, with some Tamil signboards replacing the native Telugu signboards. The film's introductory fight scene and a song were shot at a costly set in Prasad studios. While cinematography was primarily handled by Gopinath, one song "Appadi Podu" was filmed by K. V. Anand as Gopinath got hurt during the shoot. As the original version had Charminar, makers decided to replace it with the Chennai Lighthouse. Since the location had to have a building and lighthouse to be opposite in the same area, a lighthouse set alongside quarters with terrace was erected at GV Gardens at Mahabalipuram. The interval chasing sequences were canned near the Meenakshi Amman Temple in Madurai and at Manapparai in Trichy district. The climax scene was shot in a crowd of one hundred thousand people in the 2003 Vinayagar Chaturthi occasion.

== Music ==
Vidyasagar was signed to compose the soundtrack album and background score for Ghilli; it marks his fourth collaboration with both Dharani and Vijay, with the former on Ethirum Puthirum (1999), Dhill (2001) and Dhool (2003), and working with the latter on Coimbatore Mappillai (1995), Nilaave Vaa (1998) and Thirumalai (2003). The soundtrack features six songs. The lyrics were penned by Yugabharathi, Pa. Vijay, Na. Muthukumar, Kabilan and Maran. The audio was launched at Nungambakkam's School for the Deaf and Blind in March 2004.

The song "Appadi Podu" was later reused by Chakri as "Adaragottu" in the Telugu film Krishna (2008). The song was also adapted by P. A. Deepak, a music producer, as "Hum Na Tode" in the 2013 Hindi movie Boss. The song is sung by Vishal Dadlani. Following the internet phenomenon of "Why This Kolaveri Di" in 2011, "Appadi Podu" was featured alongside "Oh Podu", "Nakka Mukka" and "Ringa Ringa" in a small collection of South Indian songs that are considered a "national rage" in India. The "Kabaddi" theme music from the soundtrack album was remixed by Anirudh Ravichander, for Master (2021). The "Arjunaru Villu" from the album was remixed by Gopi Sundar, for the Malayalam-language film Bha Bha Ba (2025).

Ghilli

Soundtrack album by Vidyasagar
- Released: 10 March 2004
- Recorded: Varsha Vallaki Studios
- Genre: Feature film soundtrack
- Length: 24:05
- Language: Tamil
- Label: Five star Audio
- Producer: Vidyasagar

Vidyasagar chronology
Thirumalai (2003)	Ghilli (2004)	Madurey (2004)

Track list
No.	Title	Lyrics	Singer(s)	Length
1.	"Kabaddi"	Maran	Maran, Jayamoorty	01:44
2.	"Arjunaru Villu"	Kabilan	Sukhwinder Singh, Manikka Vinayagam	04:28
3.	"Sha La La"	P. Vijay	Sunidhi Chauhan	04:30
4.	"Appadi Podu"	Pa. Vijay	KK, Anuradha Sriram	04:53
5.	"Soora Thenga"	N. Muthukumar	Tippu	04:03
6.	"Kokkarakko"	Yugabharathi	Udit Narayan, Sujatha Mohan	04:35
7.	"Kadhala Kadhala"	P. Vijay	Sujatha Mohan	03:21

== Release ==
=== Original run ===
Ghilli was released on 17 April 2004, delayed from 9 April. Though the reason for the postponement was not given out, rumours were that Rathnam's creditors put pressure on him to settle his accounts before release.

=== Re-release ===
The film was re-released worldwide on 20 April 2024, after 20 years of its original release.

== Reception ==
=== Critical reception ===
Ghilli opened to favourable reviews from critics. IANS gave 3/5 stars and wrote "Gilli, story wise, is neither fresh popcorn nor spicy samosa found in theatres but the screenplay and overall treatment is as fresh and appetising as full meals after a long day." Sify gave 5/5 stars and wrote "the good old formula is back with Gilli. A one-man-army combats an eccentric villain against all odds as he tries to save a helpless girl from his clutches. Dharani has done it for the third time by churning out this hit-and-run yarn that keeps you engaged and entertained for 160 minutes. The Hindu wrote "Vijay, the hero whom the masses today identify with, and Prakash Raj, the inimitable villain in tow, this remake of the Telugu flick, "Okkadu," comes a clear winner".

Rediff wrote "Gilli portrays Vijay as a comic hero who battles his villains logically while his physical powers are exaggerated dramatically. Having said that, Gilli offers nothing less than sheer entertainment and an edgy thriller for the Tamil film industry, which is deprived of such films. Ananda Vikatan rated the film 45 out of 100 and wrote "With a little bit of Kabaddi, with a little bit of love, its an perfect action masala [..] The film is full of speed like a raging Sivakasi rocket". Visual Dasan of Kalki gave a negative review, saying as the entire film revolves around a chase and melee between the villain and the hero till the very last scene, Ghilli is the epitome of back-scratching exaggeration for die-hard fans. Malini Mannath of Chennai Online wrote "Dharani's Dhil and Dhool from his original screenplays were far better than this film. A film only for ardent Vijay fans". G. Ulaganathan of Deccan Herald' wrote "Gilli’s plot is puerile — little emotion, many fights and a few songs which don’t gell with the story. Vijay is almost like a superman, jumping and flying like Spiderman!".

=== Box office ===
Ghilli collected ₹50−52 crore (equivalent to ₹−201 crore or US$−21 million in 2026) worldwide in its initial run and ₹3.5 crore (equivalent to ₹14 crore or US$1.4 million in 2026) overseas, it was the highest grossing Tamil film of the year. The film collected ₹2.05 crore in the Coimbatore territory alone.

=== Accolades ===
- Filmfare Award for Best Villain – Tamil – Prakash Raj
- Filmfare Award for Best Choreography – South – Raju Sundaram

== Legacy ==
The popularity of Prakash Raj's role as Muthupandi led to several parodies incorporating the character and the endearing name "Chellam" (the way Muthupandi addresses Dhanalakshmi) became popular to sarcastically address an enemy. Janaki Sabesh and Vidyarthi, by portraying Vijay's parents, popularly became known as "Ghilli Amma" and "Ghilli Appa" respectively.

The success of the film led the cast and crew to again collaborate with another similar action film titled Kuruvi (2008).

In Master, a Kabaddi scene uses music montage invoking Ghilli, while the other song from the film, "Arjunaru Villu" was used in Naai Sekar (2022).

In 2025, a Malayalam film, titled Bha Bha Ba starring Dileep featured Mohanlal in an extended cameo appearance in a character called "Ghilli Bala". The characterization of the character is inspired from Ghilli and the film contains elements which pay tribute to Vijay.
