= Ethir Neechal (soundtrack) =

2013 soundtrack album by Anirudh Ravichander

Soundtrack album by Anirudh Ravichander
- Released: 11 January 2013
- Recorded: 2012
- Genre: Feature film soundtrack
- Length: 24:11
- Language: Tamil
- Label: Sony Music India
- Producer: Anirudh Ravichander

Anirudh Ravichander chronology
3 (2011)	Ethir Neechal (2013)	David (2013)

Ethir Neechal is the soundtrack album for the 2013 Tamil film of the same name directed by R. S. Durai Senthilkumar and produced by Dhanush, starring Sivakarthikeyan and Priya Anand in the lead roles. The film's soundtrack and score is composed by Anirudh Ravichander in his second feature film after 3 (2012). The six-song album features tracks belonging to varied genres, with lyrics written by Vaali, Dhanush and Durai Senthilkumar. The album was launched on 11 January 2013 by the Sony Music India label and received positive response from critics.

== Development ==
Following the success of the soundtrack of 3 (2012), Dhanush hired Anirudh Ravichander to compose the music for Ethir Neechal, marking his second feature film as music director. The soundtrack features six songs that belonged to varied genres; Vaali, Dhanush and R. S. Durai Senthilkumar penned lyrics for two songs each. By September 2012, Anirudh had completed four songs in Chennai. In mid-November, the composer headed to Mumbai to record vocals for two of the tracks, with one being a melody number, sung by Shreya Ghoshal. For the title track "Ethir Neechal" he hired Punjabi rapper Yo Yo Honey Singh, and Adhi from the duo Hiphop Tamizha, to croon the rap versions of the song. Dhanush also crooned two songs for the album. During late-November, he started working on the final mixing and mastering of the album, with sound engineer Eric Pillai handling the supervision at his Sound of Bombay studio in Mumbai. The making of the album was launched by the film's crew members, prior to the audio launch.

== Release ==
It was announced that Sony Music India had brought the marketing rights for the film's soundtrack album. The company paid more than ₹1 crore (US$120,000) to purchase the rights, due to the expectations regarding the film and its music album, as it was Anirudh's second film as a composer and his collaboration with Dhanush after the success of 3 and its track "Why This Kolaveri Di". On 10 December 2012, Anirudh handed the master CD of the album to Sony Music. The soundtrack was initially slated to be released on 21 December 2012. However it was not confirmed from official sources. The soundtrack album was released on 11 January 2013. The release coincided with the promotional launch event held at 92.7 Big FM Radio Station, with Dhanush, Sivakarthikeyan, Anirudh, Durai Senthilkumar and RJ Balaji in attendance. To make the launch more unique, Dhanush advertised that the film's album would be released on "Internet, CDs, YouTube and piracy sites" which received attention from movie buffs.

== Track listing ==
The official track list was released on 9 January 2013, featuring seven tracks.

Ethir Neechal (Original Motion Picture Soundtrack)
No.	Title	Lyrics	Singer(s)	Length
1.	"Nijamellam Maranthu Pochu"	Dhanush	Dhanush, Anirudh Ravichander	03:45
2.	"Boomi Enna Suthudhe"	Dhanush	Anirudh Ravichander	04:18
3.	"Ethir Neechal"	Vaalee, Yo Yo Honey Singh, Hiphop Tamizha	Anirudh Ravichander, Yo Yo Honey Singh, Hiphop Tamizha	04:29
4.	"Velicha Poove"	Vaalee	Mohit Chauhan, Shreya Ghoshal	05:10
5.	"Un Paarvayil"	R. S. Durai Senthilkumar	Anirudh Ravichander, Vivek Siva	01:37
6.	"Local Boys"	R. S. Durai Senthilkumar	Dhanush, Velmurugan	04:31
Total length:				24:11

== Critical reception ==
The Times of India gave 3.5 out of 5 stating Ethir Neechal isn't as rich as 3 in its sounding, but it's a worthy follow up by composer Anirudh." Musicperk gave 8 out of 10 starts saying that "Anirudh seals this year". Karthik of Milliblog wrote, "With Ethir Neechal, Anirudh proves that he's not a one-hit or one-album wonder!" India Study Channel gave 8 out of 10 to the album stating "Anirudh is back with powerful album and Ethitr Neechal is simply the best albums of recent time. It deserves special appreciation as each track belongs to different genre and still keeps the pace and freshness in each track. This is another album that proves that Anirudh is one of the best music directors hat we can rely upon in future." Kaushik LM reviewed it as "Ethir Neechal is a solid follow-up to 3, though sounding somewhat similar. Anirudh has created a distinct sound for himself very early in his career. Now it's up to this youngster to prove that he can try different styles and genres."

== Chart performance ==
The soundtrack to Ethir Neechal topped the iTunes charts upon its release on 11 January 2013, surpassing Kadal, and continued its position for more than 3-4 weeks. The tracks eventually listed in the Radio Mirchi Top 20 weekly charts for more than 5 weeks. S. Saraswathi of Rediff.com listed "Velicha Poove" in their "Top Tamil Songs of 2013".
