= Kadhalil Vizhunthen =

2008 Indian film by P. V. Prasath

- Theatrical release poster
- Directed by: P. V. Prasath
- Written by: P. V. Prasath
- Produced by: S. Umapathi
- Starring: Nakul; Sunaina
- Cinematography: S.D. Vijay Milton
- Edited by: V. T. Vijayan
- Music by: Vijay Antony; P. V. Prasath (1 song)
- Production company: Atlantic Cinemas
- Distributed by: Sun Pictures
- Release date: 26 September 2008
- Running time: 188 minutes
- Country: India
- Language: Tamil

Kadhalil Vizhunthen (transl. I Fell in Love) is a 2008 Indian Tamil-language romantic psychological thriller film written and directed by P. V. Prasath starring Nakul and Sunaina. The film has music by Vijay Antony, cinematography by S.D. Vijay Milton, and editing by V. T. Vijayan. The shooting for the film started in August 2007, and the film was released in September 2008.

== Plot ==
Sabhapathy is the football-crazy son of an alcoholic and lives in the slums. However, he lives a comfortable life and plays football with his friends through college. He meets Meera slowly and starts to love her but is afraid to express his love since she is rich and might react badly. However, he later does confirm his love to her, and she accepts. When Sabha leaves for a football match with his college, he promises that he will propose to Meera as soon as he gets back. Sabha returns from his match to only find out that Meera has died. He slips into a psychotic depression, travelling with Meera's dead body which he stole from the morgue. This peculiar behavior of Sabha who thinks Meera is alive is validated. A doctor shows the inspector a wildlife documentary in which a monkey continues to nurse its dead offspring. The doctor further attributes this behavior as unconditional love, which to some people makes them ignore reality and live in the past. This documentary forms the crux of the entire movie. To make matters even worse, the police are after Sabha. The climax of the movie shows Sabha committing suicide after killing Meera's uncle Kasirajan, who murdered her in order to gain her wealth. The film ends with Sabha and Meera's souls reunited and the two lovers never separated, even in death.

== Cast ==
- Nakul as Sabhapathy
- Sunaina as Meera
- Sampath Raj as Inspector Anbuselvan
- Livingston as Traveling Ticket Examiner
- Hariraj as Kasirajan, Meera's uncle
- Chaams as Meera's friend
- Pasi Sathya as Sabha's neighbour
- Nalinikanth as Doctor
- Sridhar in a special appearance in the song "Naaka Mukka"

== Production ==
The film marked the directorial debut of P. V. Prasath, who earlier assisted V. Sekhar, Vijay Milton and Azhagam Perumal. Nakul, who was one of the heroes in Boys, made his comeback through this film and he reduced substantial weight to play the lead role in the film. A stunt sequence was shot in Mettupalayam, and Nakul performed it without any dupe. The film was shot at locations in Chennai, Ooty, Thalakkonam, Mudumalai, Pollachi, Valparai, Masinagudi, Gudalar, Udumalpet, Coimbatore and Kodaikanal. The film marked the foray of the Sun Network into film distribution through their newly founded production company Sun Pictures.

== Soundtrack ==
Kadhalil Vizhunthen

Soundtrack album by Vijay Antony
- Released: 2 December 2007
- Recorded: 2007–2008
- Genre: Film soundtrack
- Length: 39:01
- Language: Tamil
- Label: Junglee Music
- Producer: Vijay Antony

Vijay Antony chronology
Budhivanta (2008)	Kadhalil Vizhunthen (2007)	A Aa E Ee (2009)

The soundtrack has nine tracks composed by Vijay Antony, except for “Unakkena Naan”, which was done by director P. V. Prasath himself. The lyrics were written by Thamarai, P. V. Prasath, Nepolian, and Priyan. The audio was released on 2 December 2007 at Sathyam Cinemas. The soundtrack met with critical acclaim and made Vijay Antony popular among the Tamil audience.

The dappankuthu song "Nakka Mukka", went viral and met with a tremendous response from India. The melodious romantic number "Thozhiya" was also a successful hit. "Unakkena Naan" is based on Rihanna's "Unfaithful".

Track listing
No.	Title	Lyrics	Music	Singer(s)	Length
1.	"Doley"	Priyan	Vijay Antony	Relina, Megha	4:17
2.	"Naaka Mukka" (Male)	P. V. Prasath	Vijay Antony	Vijay Antony	4:56
3.	"Solladi"	Thamarai	Vijay Antony	Tippu	5:08
4.	"Thozhiya"	P. V. Prasath	Vijay Antony	Harish Raghavendra, Vijay Antony, Sri Charan	4:47
5.	"Enna Sonnen"	P. V. Prasath	Vijay Antony	Nitish Gopalan	1:09
6.	"Un Thalai Mudi"	Nepolian	Vijay Antony	Karthik, Nithish Gopalan, Maya	5:27
7.	"Naaka Mukka" (Female)	P. V. Prasath	Vijay Antony	Nakul, Chinnaponnu	3:17
8.	"Unakkena Naan"	Thamarai	P. V. Prasath	Vijay Antony, Ramya NSK	3:44
9.	"Kadavul Padaitha"	P. V. Prasath	Vijay Antony	Vijay Antony, Fathima	6:16
Total length:					39:01

== Release ==
The film was lying in the cans for one year and Sun Pictures bought the film making it their first film. The film opened alongside Sakkarakatti at the box office on 26 September 2008 with the media hyping that it was a battle of two films with debutants and successful soundtracks.

The success of the film led Nakul and Sunaina reunite again in Maasilamani which too was promoted by Sun Pictures and became successful. PV Prasad started another project Eppadi Manasukkul Vanthai for he was held in cheating case and the film was finally released in 2012.

=== Critical reception ===
Rediff.com wrote, "Kadhalil Vizhundhen achieves at least in part, what other love-stories fail to do -- to bring a genuine lump in your throat at times".

== In popular culture ==
"Nakka Mukka" attained immense popularity. It was played in the opening ceremony of the Cricket World Cup 2011 held at Mirpur, Bangladesh. It also featured among a medley of Tamil songs performed by Shah Rukh Khan and Shriya Saran in the inaugural of the fourth edition of the Indian Premier League 2011 held at Chennai, India. Following the internet phenomenon of "Why This Kolaveri Di" in 2011, "Naaka Mukka" was featured alongside "Oh Podu", "Appadi Podu" and "Ringa Ringa" in a small collection of south Indian songs that are considered a "national rage" in India. The success also inspired its singer Chinnaponnu to release an English version of the song.

"Naaka Mukka" would also go on to be reused in the 2009 Telugu-language film Mahatma as "Jajjanaka" (which was also composed by Antony) and featured in the 2011 Hindi film The Dirty Picture.
