= Mana Midiyithu =

- Theatrical poster
- Directed by: M. S. Rajashekar
- Written by: T. N. Narasimhan
- Story by: Ashwini
- Produced by: Rani Rajashekar; Sowbhagyamma Ramesh
- Starring: Shiva Rajkumar; Priya Raman
- Cinematography: Mallikarjuna
- Edited by: S. Manohar
- Music by: Upendra Kumar
- Production company: Sri Vaibhavalakshmi Combines
- Release date: 4 August 1995
- Running time: 150 minutes
- Country: India
- Language: Kannada

Mana Midiyithu is a 1995 Indian Kannada-language romance film directed by M. S. Rajashekar based on a novel of same name by Ashwini. The film stars Shiva Rajkumar, in his 25th feature film, and Priya Raman, making her Kannada debut. The film's soundtrack and score was composed by Upendra Kumar.

== Cast ==
- Shiva Rajkumar
- Priya Raman
- Srinath
- Ramakrishna
- Tara
- Jayanthi
- Jai Jagadish
- Balaraj
- H. G. Dattatreya
- M. S. Umesh

== Soundtrack ==
The soundtrack of the film was composed by Upendra Kumar.

Track listing
| No. | Title | Singer(s) | Length |
|---|---|---|---|
| 1. | "Ee Premada Matthige" | S. P. Balasubrahmanyam, Manjula Gururaj |
| 2. | "Balu Joly Jodi" | S. P. Balasubrahmanyam, Sangeetha Katti |
| 3. | "Olavina Belakanu" | S. P. Balasubrahmanyam, Manjula Gururaj |
| 4. | "Hagalondu Untu" | S. P. Balasubrahmanyam, Manjula Gururaj |
| 5. | "Ellellu Neene" | S. P. Balasubrahmanyam |
