= Genes (game show) =

- Logo
- Genre: game show
- Presented by: Suma Kanakala (Season 1); Roja Selvamani (Season 2); Priya Raman (Season 3)
- Country of origin: India
- Original language: Tamil
- No. of seasons: 3
- No. of episodes: 26

Production
- Production location: Chennai
- Camera setup: Multi-camera
- Running time: approx. 40-45 minutes per episode

Original release
- Network: Zee Tamil
- Release: 19 April 2015 – present

Related
- Nil Kavani Sol; Genes (season 2); Jeans Genes (season 2)

Genes is an Indian Tamil-language reality television game show broadcast on Zee Tamil. The show premiered in 2015 and is also available for streaming on the digital platform ZEE5. Genes is a remake of the Telugu game show of the same name, which originally aired on ETV. The format of the show revolves around contestants identifying real people by connecting them through genetic similarities.

The show consists of four rounds: Same to Same, Celebrity Round, Family Tree, and Jackpot. Genes was launched on 19 April 2015 and is broadcast weekly on Sundays at 8:00 PM (IST).

== Seasons overview ==
Season	Episodes	Original Broadcast	
Season	Episodes	First Aired	Last Aired
1	26	19 April 2015	11 October 2015
2	89	18 November 2015	24 September 2017
3		17 June 2018	4 July 2021

== Season 1 ==
The first season aired every Sunday at 8:00PM from 19 April 2015 to 11 October 2015 and ended with 26 Episodes. The show was hosted by Suma Kanakala.

=== Guests included ===
Episode	Guest(s)	Amount won
1 (19 April 2015)	Venkat Prabhu & Premji Amaren	₹ 1,30,000
2 (26 April 2015)	Nandita Swetha	₹ 1,60,000
3 (3 May 2015)	Sangeetha	₹ 1,05,000
4 (10 May 2015)	Vijay Antony & Sushma	₹ 1,05,000
5 (17 May 2015)	Srinivas & Sharanya & Sunandha	₹ 95,000
6 (24 May 2015)	Iniya & Swathi	₹ 1,25,000
7 (31 May 2015)	Srinivasan	₹ 40,000
8 (7 June 2015)	Aishwarya Rajesh & Mani	₹ 1,80,000
9 (14 June 2015)	Vaiyapuri	₹ 5,10,000
10 (21 June 2015)	Sandhya & Manisha Shree	₹ 4,60,000
11 (28 June 2015)	Aadhi & Nikki Galrani & Sathya Prabhas	₹ 95,000
12 (5 July 2015)	Gayathri Raguram & Aravind	₹ 95,000
13 (12 July 2015)	Mano	₹ 4,50,000
14 (19 July 2015)	Suresh	₹ 70,000
15 (26 July 2015)	Anuradha & Abhinayashree	₹ 5,40,000
16 (2 August 2015)	Madhan Bob	₹ 1,00,000
17 (9 August 2015)	Singampuli & Shankar	₹ 60,000
18 (16 August 2015)	Kuyili	₹ 1,05,000
19 (23 August 2015)	Deepak Dinkar & Moses	₹ 1,05,000
20 (30 August 2015)	Ganja Karuppu & Jayam Kondan	₹ 6,00,000
21 (6 September 2015)	Pushpavanam Kuppusamy & Anitha Kuppusamy	₹ 9,60,000
22 (13 September 2015)	Robo Shankar	₹ 95,000
23 (20 September 2015)	Nizhalgal Ravi	₹ 8,10,000
24 (27 September 2015)	Meena	₹ 4,30,000
25 (4 October 2015)	Nirosha & Ramki	₹ 3,40,000
26 (11 October 2015)	Roja	₹ 4,60,000

== Season 2 ==
The show second season was launched on 18 November 2015 and aired weekly on every Sunday 8:00PM IST. The show is hosted by Tamil Actress Roja. The second season has four interesting rounds 1+1=3, Celebrity Round, Anniyan and Vilayadu Mangatha. The couple starts off the show well and play the game enthusiastically.

== Season 3 ==
The third season was premiered on 17 June 2018. The show hosted by actress Priya Raman replacing fellow actress Roja who previously hosted the first two editions of the game show.
