= Hariraj =

Indian actor

- Born: Harihar Raj Kalingarayar; 1968 (age 57–58)
- Occupation: Actor
- Years active: 1992-1994; 2006-2013
- Notable work: Valli (1993)
- Spouse: Arathy
- Children: 2

Hariraj is a former Indian actor who worked in Tamil-language films.

== Career ==
Hariraj worked as a hero in films during the 1990s with the most notable one being Valli (1993). He left films as a personal choice and worked in agriculture and photography in Coimbatore.

After a sabbatical, he returned with a negative role in Sundar C's Rendu (2006) followed by the role of an uncle who turns rogue in Kadhalil Vizhunthen (2007). He played a psychopathic doctor and the father of Harish Kalyan's character in Aridhu Aridhu (2010). Regarding his role, a critic wrote that "Hariraj, as the mentally disturbed father who has his own demons to battle with, is impressive". He worked with Atharvaa in the unreleased film Anandam Arambam. He also played a negative role in Ivan Veramathiri (2013).

== Filmography ==
=== Films ===
Year	Film	Role	Notes
1992	Vasantha Malargal	Raja	
1992	Chinna Chittu		
1993	Valli	Velu	
1994	Vandicholai Chinraasu	Sankar	
1994	Sainyam	Cadet	Malayalam film
2006	Rendu	Rakesh	
2007	Pachaikili Muthucharam	Ramachandran	
2008	Kadhalil Vizhunthen	Kasirajan	
2009	Mariyadhai	Land buyer	
2010	Aridhu Aridhu	Father	
2013	Ivan Veramathiri	Sadasivam	
2016	Manithan	Rahul Dewan's father	

=== Television ===
- Nambikkai (Sun TV)
