= Aridhu Aridhu =

- Directed by: K. R. Mathivanan
- Produced by: Jayakrishnan
- Starring: Harish Kalyan; Uttara Raj; Abdul Hakeem; Hariraj
- Cinematography: C.T Arul Selvan
- Edited by: S. P. Ahamad
- Music by: Thaman S
- Production company: JK Creations
- Release date: 24 December 2010
- Country: India
- Language: Tamil

Aridhu Aridhu (lit. 'Rare, Rare'; transl. Infrequent) is a 2010 Indian Tamil-language film written and directed by K. R. Mathivanan in his maiden venture. The film, produced by Jaya Krishnan under the banner name of JK Creations, stars Harish Kalyan and Uttara Raj, making her debut. Thaman S has scored the music. The film was released on 24 December 2010, during the Christmas weekend.

== Plot ==
A father is a neurosurgeon diagnosed with phonophobia kills those who make sound. He killed the mother and then targets his son which he unfortunately fell victim and was eventually lobotomised ending up as mute. When the doctor is pressured through an investigation with a Human Rights group regarding his son’s condition, he flees to Australia and within a few days, loses his son in the crowd.

The youngster falls in the hands of a pretty young NRI girl, who takes him around the streets of Australia to find his loved ones. Not knowing anything about him, the girl struggles to take care of him but soon falls in love with him.

A terrorist group that grooms suicide bombers has a member in the group who does not agree with the groups’ terrorist activities. Although he is against the idea of killing innocent people, he is unable to get out of the situation as the group is giving a huge pay-out to his family to help them with their dire financial state. He decides to get someone else to replace him, to carry out the deed.

He soon spots the son and the girl and notices his unresponsive nature. He decides to use him for his mission and straps a bomb on the son's body during a public park event. The son has unfortunately fallen victim by the terrorist group. The film ends with a long note of anti-terrorism and discourages people from taking innocent lives in the name of religion.

== Cast ==
The names of the characters are not mentioned in the film.

- Harish Kalyan as the son
- Uttara Raj as the NRI
- Abdul Hakeem as the leader of the terrorist group
- Hariraj as the father

== Production ==
Aridhu Aridhu is the directorial debut of Mathivannan, previously an assistant director under S. Shankar. Uttara, who won a New Zealand beauty pageant, made her acting debut as the lead actress.

== Soundtrack ==
Aridhu Aridhu

Soundtrack album by S. Thaman
- Released: 2010
- Recorded: 2010
- Genre: Soundtrack
- Length: 21:39
- Label: Five Star Audio
- Producer: S. Thaman

S. Thaman chronology
Mundhinam Paartheney (2010)	Aridhu Aridhu (2010)	Ayyanar (2010)

The music of the film, composed by Thaman was released in June 2010 at Sathyam Cinemas, Chennai. The lyrics are written by the director K. R. Mathivanan himself.

Track listing
No.	Title	Singer(s)	Length
1.	"Oh Lalali"	Suchitra, Chorus	4:28
2.	"Kanavugal Edhuvarai"	Benny Dayal, S. Thaman	4:19
3.	"Azhagaai Sirithaayada"	S. Thaman, K. R. Mathivanan, Chorus	4:43
4.	"Saturday Girlodu"	Ujjainee, Chorus	4:12
5.	"Missing Something"	Rita, Chorus	4:59
6.	"Un Uyirai"	Karthik	4:12
Total length:			26:53

== Critical reception ==
A critic from The New Indian Express wrote that "The script is intriguing, and the director adopts an unconventional narrative style. More of an experimental film, it would be of interest to a discerning viewer". A critic from Dinamalar wrote that Hariraj, who makes viewers sit upright in the very first dialogue, would have been talked about even more if he had shown it more effectively in the screenplay and direction.
