= Gemini (soundtrack) =

2002 soundtrack album by Bharadwaj

Soundtrack album by Bharadwaj
- Released: 1 March 2002
- Recorded: 2001–2002
- Genre: Feature film soundtrack
- Length: 30:54
- Language: Tamil
- Labels: Five Star Audio; Ayngaran Music; An Ak Audio; Star Music

Bharadwaj chronology
Roja Kootam (2002)	Gemini (2002)	Raajjiyam (2002)

Gemini is the soundtrack album for the 2002 Tamil film of the same name directed by Saran and features music composed by Bharadwaj with lyrics by Vairamuthu. Since making his entry into Tamil films with Saran's directorial debut Kaadhal Mannan, he has scored the music for most films directed by Saran. The album features seven tracks; five songs and two alternate versions of the song. An eighth track; the alternate version of the song "O Podu" released, post the film's release. The songs were well received by the audience and the track "O Podu", in particular, was a hit. The soundtrack fetched two Filmfare Awards and two Cinema Express Awards. Bharadwaj earned his first Filmfare Award for Best Music Director, along with Anuradha Sriram who received Filmfare Award for Best Female Playback Singer – Tamil. At the inaugural ceremony of International Tamil Film Awards held in Malaysia, Anuradha Sriram received ITFA Award for Best Female Playback Singer.

== Development ==
"O Podu" was a popular expression among college students in Tamil Nadu. When the director wanted a catchphrase for a song, Vairamuthu suggested using the term and building on it. On the director's insistence, the term was then incorporated into and mixed with the title song, resulting in the item number "O Podu". The song was conceived by AVM as a way of reaching out to the masses. The track, picturised on Rani and Vikram and choreographed by Ashok Raja, was sung by Anuradha Sriram. For the song, Vikram performed "savu koothu", a type of funeral dance common in Tamil Nadu. The lyrics of "Deewana", sung by Sadhana Sargam, had some Hindi words as it was picturised on the heroine, a typical Marwari woman from Sowcarpet for whom Hindi comes naturally. In an interview with The Hindu, Vairamuthu revealed that the track "Naattu Katta" was based on a folk song. (Note: The claim by Vairamuthu does not mention the name of the song on which "Naattu Katta" is based.) The song "Penoruthi" is inspired from "Why Me Lord" by Shaggy.

Vikram, having already worked as a voice artist and singer, offered to sing his version of the song "O Podu" following the song's success, for which the producers agreed. According to Vikram, the song was recorded and filmed the same morning, and was added to the soundtrack album a month after its initial release. The film had been completed by then and the additional track was featured during the closing credits. Initially, a small footage featuring Vikram and Kiran was sent to the cinemas for screening during the end credits. However, the audience were dissatisfied with the shortened version of the song and forced theatre owners to rewind the song and play it again. After receiving calls from distributors and theatre owners, the makers eventually sent the entire song.

== Track listing ==
No.	Title	Singer(s)	Length
1.	"Thala Keezha"	Manikka Vinayagam	4:10
2.	"Kaadhal Enbatha"	Timothy	2:56
3.	"Penn Oruthi"	S. P. Balasubrahmanyam	5:11
4.	"Deewana"	Sadhana Sargam	4:26
5.	"Kaadhal Enbatha -Sad"	Bharadwaj	1:16
6.	"O Podu"	S. P. Balasubrahmanyam, Anuradha Sriram	4:03
7.	"Naattu Katta"	Shankar Mahadevan, Swarnalatha	4:52
8.	"O Podu (Female)"	Anuradha Sriram	4:03
9.	"Penn Oruthi (Not featured in the film)"	Bharadwaj	5:11

== Reception ==
=== Critical response ===
The music received positive reviews from critics. Sify wrote that Bharadwaj's music was the film's only saving grace. Writing for Rediff, Pearl stated that the music director was "impressive". Malathi Rangarajan of The Hindu said that the song by Anuradha Sriram has given the term "O! Podu!", which has been part of the "local lingo" for years, a "new, crazy dimension". The song enjoyed anthem-like popularity and according to V. Paramesh, a dealer of film music for 23 years, sold like "hot cakes". It earned Rani—on whom the song was picturised—the moniker "O Podu Rani".

=== Sales and records ===
"We sold out a lakh [100,000] copies in one month. Only Rahman's music has got this kind of an opening before. Now, with the new song, it will sell another lakh before the release of the film."

— S. Kalyan of Five Star Audio about the album sales.

The album sold more than 100,000 cassettes even before the film released despite rampant piracy. It was one of the biggest hits in Bharadwaj's career and earned him his first Filmfare Award. In 2009, Mid-Day wrote, "O podu is still considered the cornerstone of the rambunctious koothu dance". In 2011, The Times of India labelled the song an "evergreen hit number". Following the internet phenomenon of "Why This Kolaveri Di" in 2011, "O Podu" was featured alongside "Appadi Podu", "Naaka Mukka" and "Ringa Ringa" in a small collection of South Indian songs that are considered a "national rage" in India.

=== Criticisms ===
The music also attracted some unexpected reactions. The high-energy track "O Podu" drove youngsters insane; some resorted to violence, enraging villagers in Tamil Nadu and damaging public property in Malaysia for fun. The lyrics by Vairamuthu, which are typically in pure Tamil, contained slang and words from other languages like "Deewana" (Hindi). This departure was criticised by film journalist Sreedhar Pillai, who derided the lyrics of "O Podu" as "pure gibberish". It was also blamed for starting a trend for vulgar and poor-quality lyrics, and the song's picturisation attracted criticism. In an article that scrutinised and decried the high level of vulgarity depicted in south Indian films, Sudha G. Tilak of Tehelka wrote that hit tracks like "O Podu" were "obvious in their debauched suggestiveness".

== Accolades ==
Filmfare Awards South

- Best Music Director – Bharadwaj
- Best Playback Singer (Female) – Anuradha Sriram

International Tamil Film Awards

- Best Playback Singer (Female) – Anuradha Sriram

Cinema Express Awards

- Best Music Director – Bharadwaj
- Best Playback Singer (Female) – Anuradha Sriram

== Legacy ==
Following the song's success, Vikram was greeted everywhere with screams of "O Podu". The success of the film prompted other film producers to capitalise on the growing popularity of the phrase "O Podu" and Vikram, with the Telugu film Bava Nachadu (2001) was dubbed and released in Tamil as O Podu. A game-based reality show for children, which was aired between 2003–2004, was titled "O Podu". AVM was involved in the show, which was produced by Vikatan Televistas and directed by Gerald. The show was broadcast for 26 weeks on Sun TV on Sundays with Raaghav as its anchor. In September 2003, physical trainer Santosh Kumar played "O Podu" among a range of popular music as part of a dance aerobics session in a fitness camp held for the India national cricket team at Bangalore.

During the run-up to the 2006 assembly election, Chennai-based journalist Gnani Sankaran began a social awareness movement to prevent electoral fraud and named it "O Podu" as a short form of "Oatu Podu" meaning "cast your vote". The movement urged the electorate to exercise the right to reject candidates under Section 49-O of The Conduct of Election Rules, 1961, wherein a voter, who has decided not to vote for anyone, can record the fact. For this purpose, the people behind "O Podu" also urged the election commission to facilitate a separate button on the electronic voting machine. During the 2010 Asia Cup, a Sri Lankan band performed "O Podu" at the India vs. Pakistan cricket match held in Dambulla. In July 2011, Vikram inaugurated "Liver 4 Life", an initiative launched by MIOT Hospitals to create awareness of the Hepatitis B virus. As the campaign was targeted at school and college students, the organisers tweaked the term "O Podu" into "B Podu" and made it the event's tagline to capitalise on the song's immense appeal.
