= Valli (film) =

- Theatrical release poster
- Directed by: K. Natraj
- Written by: Rajinikanth
- Produced by: Rajinikanth
- Starring: Rajinikanth; Priya Raman; Hariraj; Sanjay
- Cinematography: Ajayan Vincent
- Edited by: Ganesh Kumar
- Music by: Ilayaraja
- Production company: Rajini Arts
- Release date: 20 August 1993
- Country: India
- Language: Tamil

Valli is a 1993 Indian Tamil-language drama film directed by K. Natraj, and written and produced by Rajinikanth. It stars Priya Raman, Hariraj and newcomer Sanjay. The film's music was scored by Ilayaraja. Rajinikanth scripted the film, wrote the dialogues and appeared in an extended guest role.

== Plot ==
Valli returns to her village after studying for 15 years in Madras. Her cousin Velu celebrates her arrival back to the village. He was in love with Valli since childhood days, but she changed after she went to study in the city. She is no more in love with him. She falls in love with a city man called Shekar, who comes to the village with his friends for hunting. Shekar has slept with Valli promising to marry her, but cheats her and he escapes to the city. It is then found out that he is the only son of the chief minister of the state. Later, after widespread protests, Shekar is brought back by Velu. Instead of marrying Shekar, she kills him for cheating her. She is put in jail for 10 years. Finally when she returns home, she finds her wedding hall ready with pomp and fun for her marriage with Velu. Her marriage is arranged by Veeraiyan and Shiva, who know her terrible past. She thanks them for wholeheartedly helping her.

== Cast ==
- Rajinikanth as Veeraiyan (Extended guest appearance)
- Priya Raman as Valli
- Hariraj as Velu
- Sanjay Bhargav as Shekar
- Vadivelu as Shiva
- R. Dilip
- Alex as a wrestler
- Pradeep Shakthi as the wrestling champion
- Ashok as Shekar's father
- Raj Bahadur (cameo appearance)

== Production ==
=== Development ===
K. Natraj, Rajinikanth's friend from university, who earlier directed Anbulla Rajinikanth, was approached by Rajinikanth to take part as an assistant director in Annaamalai, to which Natraj gladly accepted. Then Rajinikanth approached his friends and announced that he would like to make a film for them. The script of Valli was written by Rajinikanth himself. Rajinikanth revealed that the first thing came to his mind while scripting the film was the climax. He imagined that the girl should kill the boy who destroyed her life, as opposed to the typical cliche of Tamil films where the rape victim is made to marry the rapist, he also revealed that he had completed writing the screenplay within seven days.

=== Casting and filming ===
Priya Raman made her debut as heroine, while Hariraj and Sanjay were introduced in this film. Rajinikanth was not interested in making a cameo appearance, but with insistence of his friends, he accepted and finished his portions within five days. Principal photography began in April 1993 and ended around June-July that year. The film marked the acting debut of magician Alex as actor. K. R. Vatsala was offered the role of Raman's mother in the film, but she decided to give the role to her friend after she too was interested in the role. The filming was held at Chalakudy, Pollachi and Red Hills. Hari was one of the assistant directors in the film.

== Soundtrack ==
The music was composed by Ilayaraja. The song "Ennulle Ennulle" remains one of the popular songs from this film.

Track listing
No.	Title	Lyrics	Singer(s)	Length
1.	"Ding Dong"	Vaali	Mano, Latha Rajinikanth	5:03
2.	"Enna Enna Kanavu"	Vaali	Ilaiyaraaja	5:05
3.	"Ennulle Ennulle"	Vaali	Swarnalatha	6:54
4.	"Ku Ku Koo"	Pulamaipithan	Latha Rajinikanth	5:09
5.	"Santhanam Javathu...Valli Vara"	Vaali	S. P. Balasubrahmanyam, S. N. Surendar	5:03
Total length:				27:14

== Reception ==
Malini Mannath of The Indian Express wrote, "The story has shades of 16 Vayathinile but has a freshness in its neatly etched screenplay". The profits of Valli were shared by Rajinikanth's friends including director Ravindranath and Kannada film actor Ashok, who received 10 lakh rupees each.
