= Genes season 2 =

Genes
- Season 2
- Logo
- No. of episodes: 89

Release
- Original network: Zee Tamil
- Original release: 18 November 2015 – 24 September 2017

Season chronology
- Next → Season 3

Genes is a 2015-2017 Indian Tamil-language game show on Zee Tamil. The show second season was launched on 18 November 2015 and aired weekly on every Sunday 8:00PM (IST). It is a second season of the show Genes. The show hosted by Actress Roja. The second season has four interesting rounds 1+1=3, Celebrity Round, Anniyan and Vilayadu Mangatha. The couple starts off the show well and play the game enthusiastically. Starting from Saturday 27 2016, the show aired Saturday and Sunday 8:00PM IST. Starting from Saturday 17 September 2016, the show was shifted to Saturday at 8:00PM (IST) time Slot. The show ended from 24 September 2017 with 89 Episodes.
