= Arthana =

- Directed by: I. V. Sasi
- Screenplay by: Raghunath Paleri
- Starring: Murali; Priya Raman; Radhika
- Cinematography: Ravi K. Chandran
- Music by: S. P. Venkatesh
- Release date: 1993
- Country: India
- Language: Malayalam

Arthana is a 1993 Indian Malayalam language film, directed by I. V. Sasi and starring Murali, Priya Raman and Radhika.

== Plot ==
Ramachandran/Ramu is a draughtsman, who lives with his wife Bharathi and daughter. Bharathi loves him, but is short tempered and imposes many restrictions in the house for the welfare of all. Much to his dislike, Ramu's father in law and brother in law use all means to save money from projects he is involved in, as they are partners in his construction company. His daughter, besides doing college education, is also attending a dance class. She is in love with the dance master Unni, whose mother is a well known dancer. However Unni's father's details are not revealed by his mother as he had died before their marriage and his birth. On knowing that her daughter is in love with dance master, Bharathi reaches the dance school and shouts at them, calling him a Bastard. She also suggests her club members to refrain from sending their children for the dance class. Ramachandran was much disappointed about this incident as he too had an illegitimate son.

Ramachandran's son Sreekuttan and his mother Priya are living in another house at a place where one of his project is in progress. He has a happy life there too, enjoying all freedom. He visits them often and only his best friend knows about this relationship. Though he was willing to marry Priya, she told that it is not required as she is much confident to live with his son. His best friend also suggests that the marriage will turn void as it does not have the consent of his wife. However Ramachandran plans to write his house in the village in Sreekuttan's name.

Things go worst as Ramachandran suffers a heart attack and is admitted in the ICU section of hospital. He becomes speechless, and informs his best friend that he wants to see Priya. Priya reaches the hospital with Sreekuttan and Ramachandran's friend makes way for her to visit him by carefully avoiding the presence of Bharathi. However Bharathi sees both of them, just before leaving the ICU. Ramachandran passes away that night. His brother-in-law was just about to cremate the body when Sreekuttan shouts for his father and runs towards the body. Ramachandran's friend reveals that it is Ramu's kid and, as per rituals, if there is a son for the deceased, it's he who should perform the last ceremony for his father. And so, Sreekuttan performs the last rituals and lights the body for cremation.

Bharathi's hatred toward Priya increases. However Ramu's daughter develops sisterly feelings for Sreekuttan and then with the help of Unni she traces Priya's house. It is then she realises that happy her father had been when he was with Priya and Sreekuttan. The name Sreekuttan was suggested by her. The clothes that was bought by Ramu for her were actually stitched by Priya. She is also told about how they became attracted to each other. For a new project construction, as instructed by his client, Ramachandran had destroyed the house where Priya and her mother resided. On seeing their house being destroyed, Priya's mother dies. Priya then stays with one of her friends, who insists the she tries her luck in painting. Though she tried that, no one was purchasing it. Ramachandran happened to see her, but she completely ignored him. Soon after that her paintings started to get sold. Later she learned that the paintings had been purchased by Ramachandran for use in his business ventures such as hotels. Also she finds out that Ramachandran too likes painting, and she sees portrait of her and her mother that was done by Ramachandran. As time passed by, even after knowing that Ramachandran was married, they got attracted to each other. Owing to the fear of Bharathi's reaction, he had hidden this fact from everyone.

Bharathi gets angry with her daughter and locks her up in the room. However she manages to escape through the window, and visits Priya's house. Bharathi reaches there along with her father Soman and brother and asks Priya and son to leave the house. Priya asks for a period of two days to shift.

Sreekuttan tells his mother Priya that he wants to meet his father. Priya consoles him by telling that they will meet him shortly. Bharathi's daughter plans to leave the house as she finds it uncomfortable to stay in the house. What will happen to Priya and Sreekuttan? Will Bharathi accept them? The climax reveals it.

== Cast ==
- Murali as Ramachandran
- Priya Raman As Priya Ramachandran
- Radhika as Bharathi Ramachandran
- Siddique as Suresh
- Vineeth as Jayakrishnan
- Sangita as Anu Ramachandran
- Sukumari As priyas mother
- Kuthiravattam Pappu as Nanu
- MG Soman as Madhavan Nair
- Kavitha as Savithri, Jayakrishnan's Mother
- Rajeev Rangan as Ravi
- Rani Larius aട Girija Suresh
- Jm Riswan as Sreekuttan, Ramachandran's
