= Priya Raman =

Indian actress, television presenter and television producer

- Born: 18 June 1974; Thiruvananthapuram, Kerala, India
- Occupations: Actress; Television presenter; Television producer
- Years active: 1993 - 1999; 2018– 2021
- Spouse: Ranjith (m. 1999)
- Children: 2

Priya Raman (born 18 June 1974) is an Indian actress, television presenter, and producer known for her work in Malayalam, Telugu, Tamil, and Kannada cinema, as well as Malayalam and Tamil television serials. She made her film debut in 1993 with Valli, produced by Rajinikanth, and entered the Malayalam film industry the same year with Arthana, directed by I. V. Sasi. In Telugu, she is known for her work in Subha Sankalpam (1995).

She gained recognition for her lead role in the Tamil television series Sembaruthi and for hosting the third season of the game show Genes on Zee Tamil.

== Film career ==
Malayalam director Joshiy cast her as an air force pilot in 1993 in Sainyam with Mammootty.

She has also appeared in a number of Tamil and Malayalam television serials like the Tamil serial Durga, Malayalam serial Kavyanjali produced by of Balaji Telefilms (as "Anjali"), Swarnamayooram, Pavakoothu and Orma (as "Girly"). She have acted in Zee Tamil serial Sembaruthi. She also hosts a celebrity reality game show called Genes on the same channel.

== Filmography ==
=== Film ===
Year	Film	Role	Language	Notes
1993	Valli	Valli	Tamil	Debut Tamil film
1993	Arthana	Priya	Malayalam	Debut Malayalam film
1994	Subramaniya Swamy	Valli	Tamil	
1994	Kashmeeram	Manasi Varma	Malayalam	
1994	Sainyam	Shradha Kaul	Malayalam	
1994	Maa Voori Maaraju	Jaanaki	Telugu	Debut Telugu film
1995	Manthrikam	Betty Fernandez	Malayalam	
1995	Thumboli Kadappuram	Mary Solomon	Malayalam	
1995	Desa Drohulu	Vijaya	Telugu	
1995	Leader	Priya	Telugu	
1995	Mana Midiyithu	Neeraja	Kannada	Debut Kannada film
1995	Subha Sankalpam	Sandhya	Telugu	
1995	No. 1 Snehatheeram Bangalore North	Hema	Malayalam	
1995	Dora Babu	Bharathi	Telugu	
1996	Naalamkettile Nalla Thampimar	Neena	Malayalam	
1996	Kumkumacheppu	Deepa	Malayalam	
1996	Srivari Priyuralu	Rukmini	Telugu	
1996	Sri Krishnarjuna Vijayam	Rukmini	Telugu	
1996	Mangala Sutra	Sudha	Kannada	
1996	Indraprastham	Special appearance	Malayalam	
1996	Ammuvinte Aangalamar	-	Malayalam	
1997	Bhoopathi	Julie Williams	Malayalam	
1997	Suryavamsam	Gowri	Tamil	
1997	Kalyanappittannu	Geethu	Malayalam	
1997	Asuravamsam	Nanditha Menon	Malayalam	
1997	Aaraam Thampuran	Nayanthara	Malayalam	
1998	Ponmanam	Poornima	Tamil	
1998	Harichandra	Chithra	Tamil	
1998	Pudhumai Pithan	Priya	Tamil	
1999	Sparsham	Rajani	Malayalam	
1999	Gandhiyan	Priya	Malayalam	
1999	Uthram Nakshathram	-	Malayalam	
1999	Vellimanithaalam	-	Malayalam	
1999	Chinna Raja	Priya	Tamil	
1999	Nesam Pudhusu	Vasanthi	Tamil	
1999	Sautela	Bijili	Hindi	Debut Hindi film
2018	Padi Padi Leche Manasu	Padma	Telugu	

=== TV serials ===
Year	Title	Role	Channel	Language	Notes
2000	Snehatheeram		DD Malayalam	Malayalam	Television Debut
2000	Snehatheeram		Surya TV	Malayalam	Sequel to Snehatheeram
2000	Neelambari		Vijay TV	Tamil	
2001	Porutham	Haritha	Surya TV	Malayalam	
	Sri Durga	Durga	Jaya TV	Tamil	
2004–2006	Kavyaanjali	Anjali	Surya TV	Malayalam	Remake of Kundali
2005–2006	Orma	Girly	Asianet	Malayalam	
2000	Pavakoothu	Gayathri	Amrita TV	Malayalam	
2006–2007	Suryavamsam	Manasa	Gemini TV	Telugu	Replaced Vijayalakshmi
2006	Swarnamayooram	Krishnaveni	Asianet	Malayalam	
2007	Girija.M.A	Girija	Jaya TV	Tamil	
2008	Porantha Veeda Puguntha Veeda	Lakshmi	Sun TV	Tamil	
2009–2010	Kadhaparayum Kaavyanjali	Anjali	Surya TV	Malayalam	Sequel to Kaavyanjali
2017–2022	Sembaruthi	"Aadhikadavur" Akhilandeshwari and Bhuvaneswari	Zee Tamil	Tamil	Comeback serial, parallel female lead, dual role
2018–2019	Arayannangalude Veedu	Priyalakshmi	Flowers TV	Malayalam	
2021	Senthoora Poove	Aruna – Duraisingham's First Wife	Star Vijay	Tamil	
2021	Baakiyalakshmi	Herself	Star Vijay	Tamil	Guest appearance
2021	Rajini	Akhila Purshothaman	Zee Tamil	Tamil	Cameo appearance in promo
2025	Pookkaalam	Priyadarshini Menon	Mazhavil Manorama	Malayalam	

=== Other shows ===
Year	Title	Role	Channel	Language	Notes
2018–2021	Genes (season 3)	Anchor	Zee Tamil	Tamil	Game show
2018	Onnum Onnum Moonu	Guest	Mazhavil Manorama	Malayalam	Talk show
2018	Anveshana	Guest	E TV	Telugu	Talk show
2018	Cinema Vikatan	Guest		Tamil	Talk show
2018	Super Mom	Akhilandeswari		Tamil	Reality show
2019	Top Singer	Celebrity Judge	Flowers TV	Malayalam	Reality show
2019	Dance Jodi Dance Juniors	Judge	Zee Tamil	Tamil	Reality show
2019	Alitho Saradaga	Guest	E TV Telugu	Telugu	Talk show
2019	Little Talks	Guest		Tamil	Talk show
2019–2020	Dance Jodi Dance 3.0	Judge	Zee Tamil	Tamil	Reality show
2021	Stylish Tamilachi vs Mass Tamilan	Anchor	Zee Tamil	Tamil	Talk show
2021	Super Mom Reunion	Guest	Zee Tamil	Tami	Reality show
2022	Sembaruthi Vetri Vizha	Herself	Zee Tamil	Tamil	Special show
2025	Cooku with Comali season 6	Contestant	Star Vijay	Tamil	Reality show Eliminated episode 40

=== Web series ===
Year	Title	Role	Platform	Notes
2019	Madras Meter Show	Contestant	ZEE5	Episode 5

== Award and nominations ==
- Cinema Express Awards Best Newface Actress -Valli
- Zee Tamil Family Awards
- 2018 -Won – Most Popular Mom – Sembaruthi
- 2019 -Nominated – Best Anchor – Genes Season 3
- 2020-Won- Best Anchor – Genes Season 3
- 2020– Nominated – Most Popular Mom- Sembaruthi
- 2020– Nominated- Most Popular Mamiyar- Sembaruthi
