= Latha Rajinikanth =

Indian film producer (born 1958)

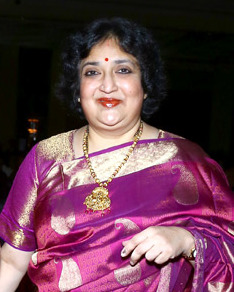
- Latha at the NDTV Indian Of The Year awards in 2013
- Born: Latha Rangachari; 2 March 1958 (age 68); Thiruvallikeni, Madras, Tamil Nadu, India
- Other name: Latha Rao Gaikwad
- Occupations: Film producer; Playback singer
- Spouse: Rajinikanth (m. 1981)
- Children: Aishwarya Rajinikanth; Soundarya Rajinikanth
- Relatives: Ravi Raghavendra (brother); Y. G. Mahendran (brother-in-law); Anirudh Ravichander (nephew)

Latha Rajinikanth (born Latha Rangachari; 2 March 1958) is an Indian film producer and playback singer. She is married to actor Rajinikanth.

== Early life ==
Latha was born in Chennai, India in a Tamil family. She graduated with degree in English literature from Ethiraj College for Women, Chennai.

== Career ==
During the 1980s, Latha worked as a playback singer in Tamil cinema. She sang a few songs in films such as Tik Tik Tik (1981) and Anbulla Rajinikanth (1984). She also contributed to Rajini 25 (1999), a musical album that commemorated Rajinikanth's 25 years of his career.

In 1991, Latha founded The Ashram, a school in Velachery, Chennai, which she currently heads.

== Personal life ==
Latha is the sister-in-law of Tamil playwright and film actor Y Gee Mahendran. She is also related to former film actress Vyjayanthimala. Latha's brother Ravi Raghavendra is also an actor who is the father of music director Anirudh Ravichander. She married Rajinikanth, whom she met during an exclusive interview, on 26 February 1981 at Tirupati. The couple has two daughters, Aishwarya and Soundarya. She has four grandchildren.

== Controversy ==
=== Document forgery case ===
An FIR had been filed in Bangalore against Latha for allegedly forging documents to obtain a court order, restraining media from publishing news about her dispute with a commissioned producer over selling of rights of Kochadaiiyaan on 15 June 2015.

=== Rent issues ===
Latha operates a shop on CP Ramaswamy Road. Operating from a building owned by Chennai Corporation, Latha has for the past 25 years run a travel agency called "Travel Exchange India". The city Corporation recently increased the rent from ₹3,702 (equivalent to ₹5,700 or US$59 in 2026) to ₹21,160 (equivalent to ₹32,000 or US$340 in 2026) per month. Latha filed a petition in the Madras High Court challenging the decision of the Greater Chennai Corporation. The Madras HC dismissed the petition filed on Latha Rajinikanth's behalf and ordered the corporation to take ownership of the property in a month if the due rental was not received.

A school run by Latha Rajinikanth in Chennai was locked up by the landlord of the building in August 2017, who claimed he had not received two rent payments of ₹20 million (equivalent to ₹31 million or US$320,000 in 2026). The owner said in 2002 he leased out the school ground to be used. He said that over a year ago he had filed a case against the management of the school because they had not paid the rent amounting to ₹100 million (equivalent to ₹150 million or US$1.6 million in 2026). In December 2020, the Madras High Court has ordered Latha to vacate the school by 30 April.

== Filmography ==
=== As producer ===
Year	Title
1986	Maaveeran
1993	Valli

=== As singer ===
- "Netru Indha Neram" - Tik Tik Tik
- "Kadavul Ullame" - Anbulla Rajinikanth
- "Ding Dong" - Valli
- "Kukkukoo Koovum" - Valli
- "Manappenin Sathiyam" - Kochadaiiyaan

=== As costume designer ===
- Valli (1993)

=== As actress ===
- Agni Sakshi (1982)
