= St. George's School, Chennai =

St. George's Anglo Indian Higher Secondary School
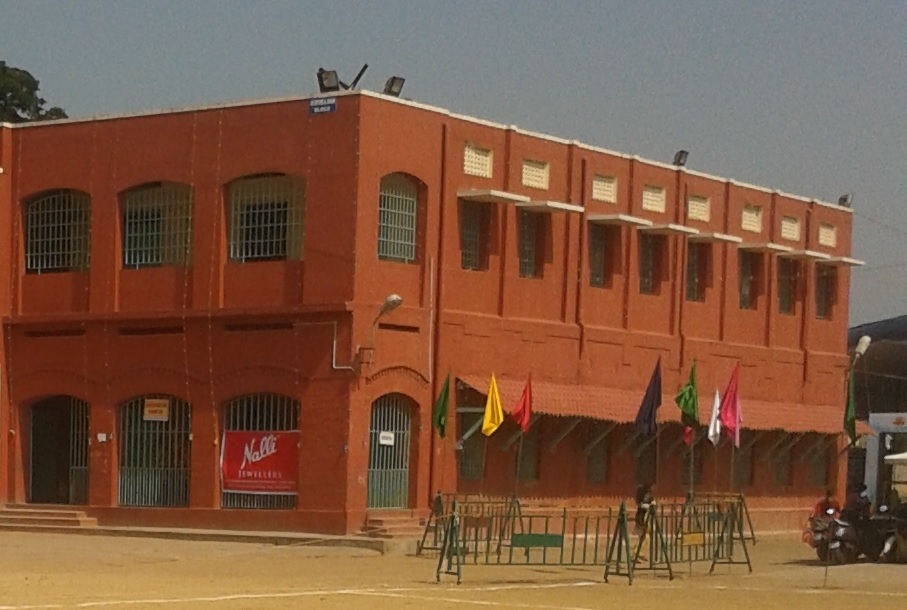
- St Georges School Chennai

Location
- 738 EVR Salai; Shenoy Nagar, Chennai, Tamil Nadu, 600 030; India; 13°04′36″N 80°13′55″E

Information
- Type: Public school
- Motto: Trust in god and do the right
- Founded: 1715; 311 years ago
- Director: G.K.Francis
- Headmaster: Mr. Mark Donald Carron
- Teaching staff: 38
- Average class size: 40
- Classes offered: K-12
- Language: English
- Colours: Red, White and Navy Blue
- Song: Praise my soul
- Nickname: St. George's
- Affiliation: Anglo Indian Board for Secondary Education

St George's Anglo- Indian Higher Secondary School was founded in 1715 as the Military (later Madras) Male Orphan Asylum and is the oldest school in India. It is affiliated to the Anglo-Indian Board of Education.

It is in Shenoy Nagar, an area in Chennai, Tamil Nadu, India. The school has red brick buildings on a land area of 21 acres (85,000 m^{2}), and provides education to over 1500 children from nursery up to the +2 level. There are 36 staff members led by the Head Master and the Correspondent.

== Hockey ==
St George's field hockey team has produced players who have represented Tamil Nadu and India at various levels.

== Heritage structure ==
The chapel and the classroom block of the school are part of CMDA's 400 recognized heritage structures in the city.

== Controversies ==
=== Child Sex Abuse Case ===
On 18 June 2009 there were news reports that a UK volunteer was "misbehaving" with students. A four-member UK detective team probed this but the evidences started to go missing including the whistle-blower, victims and videotape statements.

=== Fee structure increase ===
In June 2012 there were news reports of increase in fee structure which was not in conformance with the fee structure set by Anglo-Indian Board, further to this there were protest by parents which resulted in ten parents being arrested and later released by Chennai Police. It's confirmed that the fees collected in St. George's is the lowest in all Anglo Indian schools in India.

=== Public events ===
There were further allegations about school premises being misused for public events and other private events (including movie audio releases), although school principal R. Paul Victor Samuel maintained that these allegations were baseless.

On 6 September 2018 the Hon’ble High Court of Madras passed an ad-interim injunction against the school restraining them from carrying out any business activities / commercial activities in its playground / vacant site in WMP.No.21682/2018 pending disposal of the writ petition WP.No.18737/2018.

=== Renovation of old structure ===
The Manorial Conway House, a century old building in the school campus was renovated and resulted in concerns from heritage activists. The school correspondent Mr. G.K. Francis clarified that part of the building had to be renovated since it was not safe for the children. He also clarified that only the chapel was part of the heritage structure listed by CMDA and others are not and does not require permission from CMDA.

== Tercentenary celebrations ==
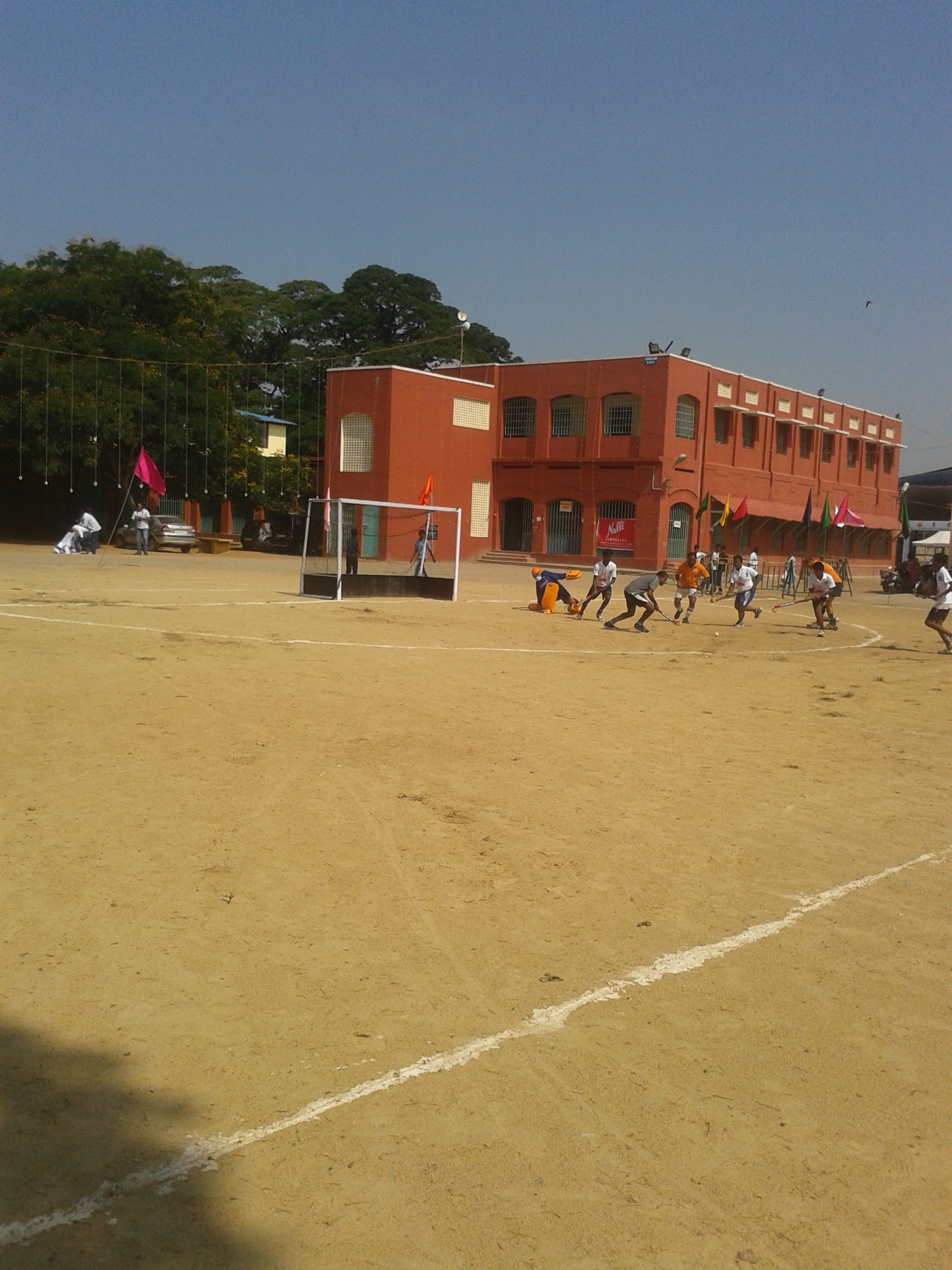
Tercentenary sporting activities

St George's school's tercentenary celebrations were held between 23 April 2015 and 25 April 2015.
