= Anbulla Rajinikanth =

1984 film by K. Natraj

- DVD cover
- Directed by: K. Natraj
- Written by: Thooyavan
- Produced by: M. S. Akbar; Durga Tamizhmani
- Starring: Rajinikanth; Meena; Ambika
- Cinematography: Babu
- Edited by: R. Vittal
- Music by: Ilaiyaraaja
- Production company: S. T. Combines
- Release date: 2 August 1984
- Running time: 180 minutes
- Country: India
- Language: Tamil
- Budget: ₹2.3 million

Anbulla Rajinikanth (transl. Dear Rajinikanth) is a 1984 Indian Tamil-language children's drama film directed by K. Natraj in his debut. The film stars Rajinikanth as himself in the titular role, alongside Meena and Ambika. It was released on 2 August 1984, and received positive reviews, with praise for Meena's performance and Rajinikanth's acting, but was not a box office success.

== Plot ==
Rosy, a girl with a left arm paralysed and weak cardiac health, lives at an orphanage along with others that were given up by their parents due to disabilities or having no parents, or for other reasons. Having been disowned by her parents for untold reasons since her birth and her inability to be like other normal children attributes to her rudeness. She even ill-treats all her caretakers, which leads to hatefulness towards her by almost all other orphanage workers and orphan children, except Mother Superior, who heads the orphanage and is always kind to everyone regardless of their age. Lalitha arrives at the orphanage as a babysitter. She is assigned to take care of Rosy by Mother Superior. She, unlike any other caretakers, takes care of Rosy despite her rudeness and shows extra care for her like a real mother herself, which even surprises Mother Superior as the older caretakers gave up and sidelined when it came to taking care of Rosy, owing to her arrogance.

It is informed that actor Rajinikanth would one day visit the orphanage as a guest to entertain children on a special occasion under the permission of Mother Superior, who sought to bring change to everyone in the orphanage. Rajinikanth arrives and distributes sweets to every child and staff kindly. But when Rosy's turn comes, she rudely disregards his gifts. While this infuriates everyone around, Rajinikanth imbibes ignominy caused by Rosy's behaviour since she is a child, and continues being calm and positive. He announces that he will freely screen his newly released film Annai Oru Aalayam. Rosy, however, not only earns everyone's disgust for her actions, but on the inside also feels saddened that she herself did this, which even made her more grumpy.

Later that night, Rosy avoids the film screening. However, she gets interested as she hears it over the window. After a glimpse of a few scenes of it from the window, she goes on to watch the whole film, wherein the protagonist saves a baby elephant from poachers and reunites it with its mother, displaying parental love, which affects Rosy in terms of sentiments that makes her want to apologise for her unkind acts. The next day, she displays a change, to everyone's awe. She apologises to Rajinikanth through a letter, saying that this film was the reason for her to change her perspective towards her nature, which Rajinikanth swiftly agrees to and replies to her, reciprocating his kindness. Having found herself to have become a bigger fan of Rajinikanth, Rosy obsesses about her favourite superstar. Mother Superior, happy on this change of Rosy, requests to Rajinikanth herself, to which he kindly obliges.

Rajinikanth again returns one day and sets up a play with K. Bhagyaraj, obliging for Mother Superior's request to please the kids. There, he and Rosy bond with each other, which extends to limits where Rajinikanth takes Rosy almost everywhere, even to his shoots of new films. One day, at the orphanage with Rajnikanth, Rosy coughs up blood and faints. The doctor finds out that Rosy has a weak heart and reveals that she has just a few days left to live, shocking Lalitha and Rajinikanth. Rajinikanth vows to keep Rosy happy for the rest of her life and approaches senior doctors for help. Lalitha reveals that she is the real mother of Rosy when Mother superior and her have a confrontation in private. She had to give up her daughter because of her family and the loss of her husband, Raju. Mother Superior had consulted doctors as early as when Rosy was only a baby, only to be told that the medical issue cannot be cured even by modern advances.

Knowing that Rosy was reaching the end of her life, Mother Superior seeks the help of Rajnikanth so that she finds solace in him that she remains happy, let alone the fact of how long she would survive. Rosy demands Rajinikanth once to come and celebrate Christmas as Santa Claus, such that nobody realises. On Christmas Eve, Rajinikanth does as Rosy's wish, soon after which he reveals himself. Overjoyed, Rosy laughs so hard out of happiness that she once again coughs up blood and faints. Realising that night was her last one, everyone gathers around crying, especially Rosy's friends, who started to like her ever since the change in her attitude that they were going to miss her forever. On that sad moment, she also reveals that she was aware that Lalitha was her real mother, which makes everyone go into shock. Holding her idol's hand, Rosy dies. After her funeral, Rajinikanth sombrely leaves the orphanage.

== Cast ==
- Rajinikanth as himself
- Ambika as Lalitha
- Meena as Rosy
- Rajkumar Sethupathi as Raju
- Tinku as J. C. Peter
- Sulakshana as Stella
- Manimala
- Uma as Periya Pushpam
- Y. G. Mahendran
- Senthamarai as Lalitha's father
- Vadivukkarasi as Lalitha's mother
- Kamala Kamesh
- Usilai Mani

Guest appearances

- Jaishankar as himself
- K. Bhagyaraj as himself
- Radhika as herself
- S. P. Muthuraman as himself
- R. Parthiban as Bhagyaraj's assistant director
- K. Natraj as passport officer

== Production ==
Producer Azhagan Thamizhmani and writer Thooyavan saw a film called Touched by Love (also known as To Elvis, with Love), in 1980 at a film festival, both got emotional while watching the film, which prompted them to attempt a similar story in Tamil. Thooyavan finished writing the screenplay within a month. He wanted to cast M. G. Ramachandran as the hero, but could not do so. Thooyavan narrated the story to K. Natraj who was working an assistant director in Devar Films. Natraj agreed to work on the film and Rajinikanth accepted to act in the film for free of charge. Rajinikanth initially agreed to give callsheet of 6 days then extended for 10 days since he wanted the film to come out well. The film was entirely shot in a school with 300 students. Rajkumar Sethupathi, brother of actress Latha and husband of actress Sripriya did a small role as Ambika's husband. Meena appeared as one of the main characters. A scene where Rosy visits Rajinikanth's house for tea was filmed at the actual location. The budget of the film was ₹2.3 million. The song "Thenpoove" was shot at a garden in Manimangalam.

== Soundtrack ==
The music was composed by Ilaiyaraaja.

Song	Singers	Lyrics	Length
"Ilanguyile"	Vani Jairam	Vaali	4:17
"Kadavul Ullame"	Latha Rajinikanth, Chorus	Vaali	4:17
"Muthumani Chudare Vaa"	K. J. Yesudas	Na. Kamarasan	4:17
"Thaaththa Thaaththa"	Malaysia Vasudevan	Kuruvikkarambai Shanmugam	3:45
"Then Poove"	S. P. Balasubrahmanyam, S. Janaki	Vaali	4:23

== Release and reception ==
Anbulla Rajinikanth was released on 2 August 1984. The following day, The Hindu said, "For one making his debut as director Natraj deserves accolades for the near-to-the-heart treatment of the situations in which the performance of a six-member-group of orphans will make even elder artistes sit up" and concluded, "Babu's camera embellishes the frames". Jayamanmadhan (a duo) of Kalki wrote three different reviews on this film on every week appreciating each cast and crew, on 19 August 1984 issue, praised the performance of Meena, while on 26 August 1984 issue, they praised the performance of child actor Tinku and the presence of Rajinikanth in the film, and on 2 September 1984 issue, they praised Natraj's direction, Thooyavan's dialogues and concluded saying this film can be watched with family and children and also by the fans of Ilaiyaraaja. Balumani of Anna praised the acting and direction and praised producers for making a film for society. Despite receiving positive reviews, the film was a box-office bomb.

== Legacy ==
The film's title inspired two unrelated films: Anbulla Kamal, the Tamil-dubbed version of the Malayalam film Four Friends (2010), and Anbulla Ghilli (2022).

== Bibliography ==
- Ramachandran, Naman, ed. (2012). Rajinikanth 12.12.12: A Birthday Special. Kasturi & Sons Ltd.
