= 3 (2012 Indian film) =

2012 Indian film by Aishwarya R. Dhanush

- Theatrical release poster
- Directed by: Aishwarya Rajinikanth
- Written by: Aishwarya Rajinikanth
- Produced by: K. Vimalageetha; Dhanush
- Starring: Dhanush; Shruti Haasan; Prabhu; Sivakarthikeyan; Sunder Ramu
- Cinematography: Velraj
- Edited by: Kola Bhaskar
- Music by: Anirudh Ravichander
- Production company: R. K. Productions Pvt. Ltd
- Release date: 30 March 2012
- Running time: 148 minutes
- Country: India
- Language: Tamil

3 is a 2012 Indian Tamil-language romantic psychological thriller film written and directed by Aishwarya Rajinikanth, in her directorial debut. Her then-husband Dhanush played the lead role alongside Shruti Haasan, while Prabhu, Sivakarthikeyan and Sunder Ramu appear in prominent roles. The film follows Ram (Dhanush) and Janani (Haasan), two intermediate sweethearts who eventually get married. However, Ram suddenly commits suicide, and Janani tries to unearth the truth behind his death.

The cinematography was handled by Velraj, and editing was done by Kola Bhaskar. Dhanush's cousin-in-law, Anirudh Ravichander, composed the soundtrack album and background score, marking his debut as a composer; Dhanush wrote the lyrics, and the album received positive reviews upon release. The song "Why This Kolaveri Di", penned and sung by Dhanush, became one of the most-streamed songs of all time and was also listed as one of the "Recently Most Popular (Gold) Videos" on YouTube.

The film was released worldwide on 30 March 2012, and received mixed-to-positive reviews, with praise for Dhanush and Shruti's performances and Anirudh's soundtrack and score, but some criticism for the narration. The film won three Filmfare Awards for Best Actor and Best Male Playback Singer for Dhanush, and Best Music Director for Anirudh Ravichander. Dhanush won three awards, Best Actor, Best Lyricist, and Best Male Playback Singer at the 2nd South Indian International Movie Awards. Following the success of "Why This Kolaveri Di", Dhanush was invited by Former Prime Minister Dr. Manmohan Singh as a Guest of Honour.

== Plot ==
At Ram's funeral, his wife Janani hallucinates about him running away. The film flashes back to when they were both 12th-grade students, when Ram helps Janani fix her bicycle and tells his friends Senthil and Kumaran that he has a crush on her. He joins her tuition to see her every day, hoping she will reciprocate his love for her. As time goes by, she eventually reciprocates his love.

After Janani's maid awakens her, she tries to find Ram's friend, Senthil, to learn the mystery behind Ram's death. Janani enquires about Senthil's parents, but finds no clues. Later, Janani finds a suicide letter from Ram in his coat. She again asks Senthil's parents to convince Senthil to help Janani, and she asks him to reveal what they were hiding from her. A distraught Senthil tells Janani that when he was leaving for the US, Kumaran got a job and moved to Singapore. Upon finding out that his two friends have moved on, Ram hallucinates and almost drowns when he tries to swim past a beach but is saved by Senthil. Senthil does not suspect anything strange and thinks this happened because Ram was drunk. Later on, one day when Ram took a 3.2 crore loss, he lost control and accidentally killed Janani's pet dog, Tom. This leads Senthil to consult a doctor, who notices Ram being strange and having extreme emotions, the primary emotions being despair or anger. Senthil tells a doctor about Ram's actions; the doctor reveals it might be bipolar disorder, and if it is not treated, it could lead to suicide. When Senthil tries to warn Ram by inviting him to spend nights out with him, Ram loses control, attacks Senthil with a bottle and chair, and leaves. Later, Senthil finds Ram unconscious on the road.

The visit from the doctor confirms that Ram has severe bipolar disorder, but Ram refuses to get admitted to the hospital because of his love for Janani. To stay away from Janani, Ram goes on a pilgrimage, which only deepens the anguish. Janani notices Ram's absurd behavior and asks him why he is acting weird. Later, at a club, Ram picks a fight with a drunkard who was misbehaving with Janani. Later, Ram and Senthil are beaten up by the gang of the drunkard's friends. When the drunkard tries to kill him, Ram beats them up and hinders them. That night, Ram and Senthil return home wounded. Janani becomes restless seeing Ram injured. After this incident, Ram decides not to tell Janani about his condition. Ram spends time in the hospital as his condition worsens. Janani becomes frustrated with Ram for not telling her where he goes and why. She suspects him of having an extramarital affair. Janani lashes out at Ram and cries. After a while, Ram, in a manic state, tries to kill Janani, unbeknownst to her (since she was in a deep sleep), but is stopped by Senthil. This makes Ram feel guilty.

Ram asks his father to transfer his company shares to Janani and wants Senthil to leave him to see Janani. Senthil refuses, and Ram suddenly bashes Senthil's head against a steering wheel, rendering him unconscious. Ram tearfully says goodbye to Senthil and leaves the car. In the present, Senthil and Janani are crying profusely. As Ram goes to Janani's bedroom and watches her sleep, he suddenly hallucinates seeing a young girl telling him to either kill her or he dies. Terrified, Ram immediately gets away from her bed. Ram goes to his office and writes a suicide note while the hallucinations continue. Ram grabs a knife and struggles to kill himself. In the present, Janani is wailing in grief as she learns her husband's fate. The film ends with Ram committing suicide by slitting his throat and saying his final words, "I love you, Janani".

The movie ends with a message that "Suicide is not a solution. Bipolar disorder can be treated with proper medical help."

== Cast ==
- Dhanush as Ramachandran "Ram"
- Shruti Haasan as Janani Ramachandran, Ram's wife
- Prabhu as Ram's father
- Sivakarthikeyan as Kumaran, Ram's friend
- Sunder Ramu as Senthil, Ram's friend
- Bhanupriya as Ram's mother
- Jeeva Ravi as Janani's father
- Rohini as Janani's mother
- Gabriella Charlton as Sumi, Janani's sister
- Sunita Gogoi as Priya, Janani's friend
- Sumathi Sree as Eshwari, Ram's and Janani's housemaid
- Badava Gopi as Teacher
- Manoj Kumar as Senthil's father
- Anuradha Krishnamoorthy as Senthil's mother

== Production ==
Aishwarya Rajinikanth stated that the script was written with Amala Paul in mind after being impressed by her work in Mynaa, but the actress was unavailable to do the film. Aishwarya later signed Amala Paul to the role. However, Amala Paul was unavailable to start the film early and left the project, and Shruti Haasan joined the team after her Telugu film was delayed. Filming began in late July 2011. A press meet was held at the Star City Hotel in early August 2011 in Chennai.

== Music ==
The soundtrack and score for this film are composed by Anirudh Ravichander, marking his debut as a music composer. The song "Why This Kolaveri Di" was released as a single by Sony Music on 16 November 2011. This song written and performed by Dhanush, became one of the most streamed songs of all time. It also featured in the "Recently Most Popular (Gold) Videos" on YouTube. The full soundtrack album was released at a launch event on 23 December 2011 and gained extremely positive reviews.

== Release ==
The film was released on 30 March 2012, with 400 prints in Tamil.

Film producer and distributor Natti Kumar reportedly said that out of the Rs. 60 million (US$1.33 million approximately) he spent on distribution rights and publicity, he had been able to recover only Rs. 47.0 million (US$0.83 million approximately).

In September 2024, the film was re-released in theatres.

== Reception ==
The film received mixed reviews from critics. Vishnupriya Bhandaram of The Hindu wrote "Aishwarya R. Dhanush takes a twisted look at love and its meaning – when you put someone before your own existence – comes across as profound, underlining theme in the film. It fades out as a moving and tragic ode to romance, to the grand idea called 'love'". Sify called the film "poignant", quoting that "On the whole, 3 has its heart in the right place, though the second half seem scattered. Overlook these faults, and make it a point to watch 3". Pavithra Srinivasan of Rediff rated the movie 3 out of 5, saying that "There are certain moments in 3 that defy logic at times, and sentiment rules the roost, but Aishwarya Dhanush has chosen to present a take on romance that is appealing in its freshness. The lead actors help as well. Her little thriller-twist aside, 3 is a movie that is an ode to romance, above all else."

L Romal M Singh of DNA India gave the movie 3 stars out of 5, commenting that "We do not think anyone would want to watch the movie again, only because it demands too much from you emotionally. We however, plan to watch this movie once more and walk out during the interval, we'd advise the romantics to do the same." In.com rated the film 3.5 out of 5, claiming that "3 is average and not worth watching in the theaters. Better wait for the DVD! It fails to meet the expectations and works only in parts, but Aishwarya had shown promise by taking a serious subject in her very first film".

== Awards ==
2nd South Indian International Movie Awards

- Best Actor - Dhanush
- Best Lyricist - Dhanush for "Kannazhaga"
- Best Male Playback Singer - Dhanush for "Why This Kolaveri Di"
- Nominated—Best Actress - Shruti Haasan
- Nominated—Best Music Director - Anirudh Ravichander.
- Nominated—Best Male Playback Singer - Mohit Chauhan for "Po Nee Po"
- Nominated—Best Female Playback Singer - Shruti Haasan for "Kannazhaga"
- Nominated—Best Female Playback Singer - Shweta Mohan for "Nee Partha Vizhigal"
- Nominated—Best Debutant Producer - Dhanush
- Nominated—Best Debutant Director - Aishwarya Dhanush

60th Filmfare Awards South

- Best Actor - Dhanush
- Best Male Playback Singer - Dhanush ("Why This Kolaveri Di")
- Nominated—Best Actress - Shruti Haasan
- won—Best Music Director - Anirudh

Asiavision Awards

- Excellence in Tamil - Shruti Hassan

Vijay Awards

- Best Actor - Dhanush
- Best Male Playback Singer - Mohit Chauhan for "Po Nee Po"
- Best Find of the Year - Anirudh
- Nominated—Best Actress - Shruti Haasan
- Nominated—Best Music Director - Anirudh
- Nominated—Favourite Hero - Dhanush
- Nominated—Favourite Heroine - Shruti Haasan
- Nominated—Favourite Song - "Why This Kolaveri Di"

== See also ==
- List of mental disorders in film
- Bipolar disorder
