= Aishwarya Rajinikanth =

Indian film director and playback singer (born 1982)

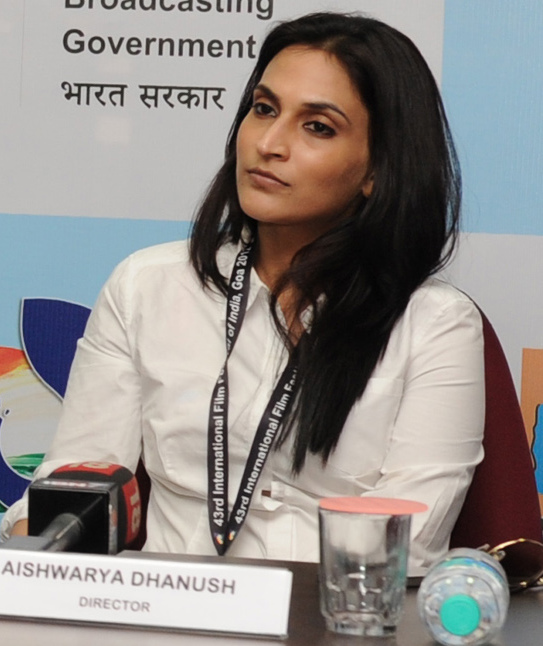
- Aishwarya in 2012
- Born: 1 January 1982 (age 44); Madras (now Chennai), Tamil Nadu, India
- Other name: Aishwarya R. Dhanush
- Occupations: Film director; playback singer
- Years active: 2003–present
- Spouse: Dhanush (m. 2004; div. 2024)
- Children: 2
- Parents: Rajinikanth (father); Latha Rajinikanth (mother)
- Relatives: Rajinikanth family
- Family: Soundarya Rajinikanth (sister)

Aishwarya Rajinikanth (born 1 January 1982) is an Indian film director and playback singer who works in Tamil cinema. She became a playback singer with the 2003 film Whistle alongside Silambarasan, which was then followed by the song "Un Mela Aasadhan" in the 2010 film Aayirathil Oruvan, for which she also worked as an assistant director. She made her feature film directorial debut with 3 (2012). She directed the 2024 film Lal Salaam, and in early 2026, she was serving as director for the production of Texla , with Suraj Venjaramoodu as a headliner.

== Early life ==
Aishwarya was born in 1982 to actor Rajinikanth and singer Latha Rangachari. She has a younger sister, Soundarya, who works in the Tamil film industry as well.

== Career ==
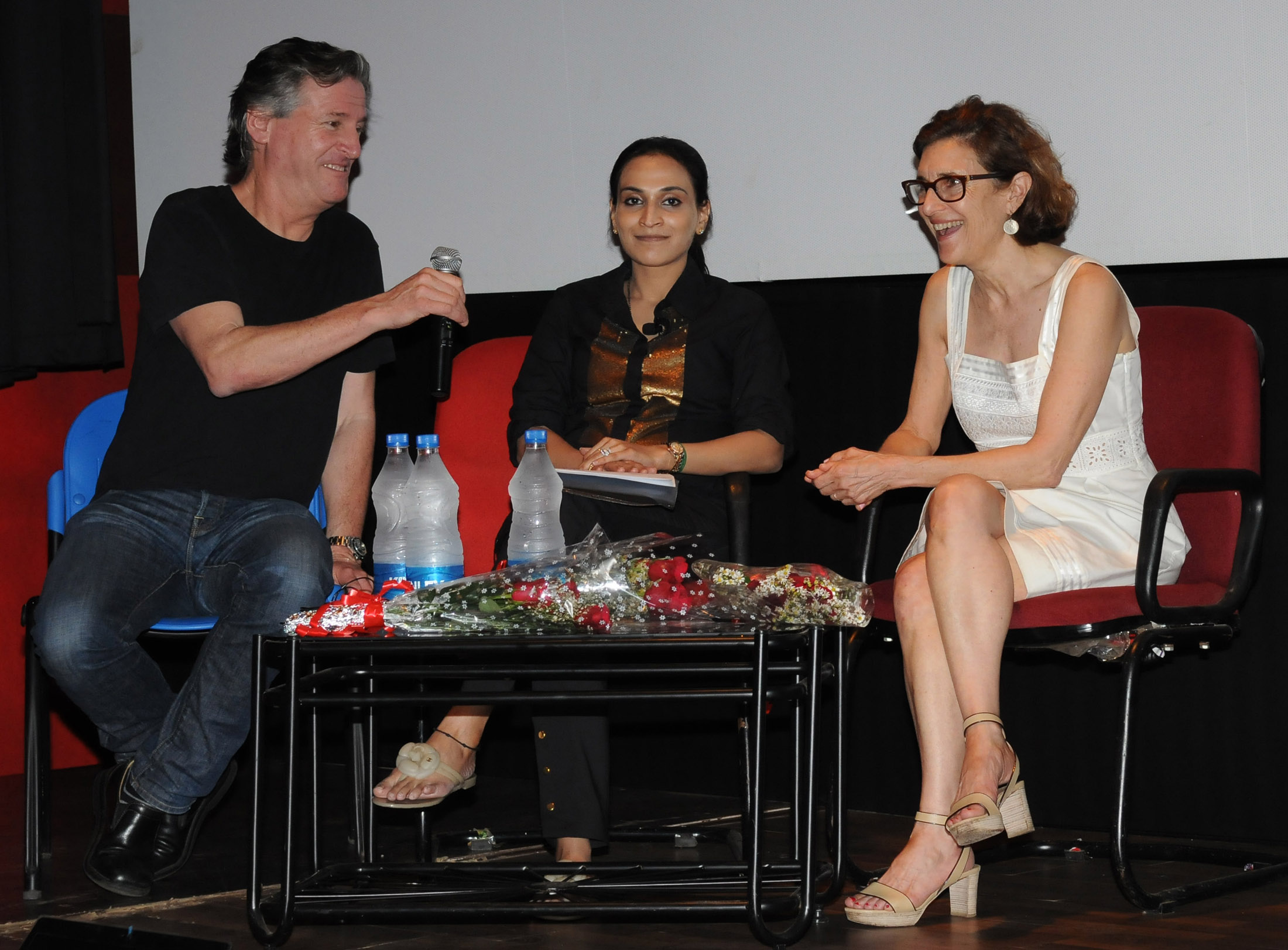
Aishwarya Rajinikanth (center), David Womark (left), Avy Kaufman (right) at IFFI 2012

Aishwarya began her career in the Tamil film industry as a playback singer in the unreleased film Ramanaa, directed by Parthy Bhaskar. The song was composed by Deva in November 2000. Her first song to be released was "Natpe Natpe" from D. Imman's soundtrack for Whistle (2003), which she sang alongside the composer and actor Silambarasan.

She was a judge on STAR Vijay's dance competition Jodi Number One in its 2008 third season alongside actors Sangeetha and Jeeva.

She also sang the song "Un Mela Aasadhan" in the 2010 film Aayirathil Oruvan, for which she also worked as an assistant director.

In August 2011, she announced that she would direct her husband, Dhanush, and Shruti Haasan in her first feature film titled 3. The film was highly anticipated prior to its release, after the song "Why This Kolaveri Di" from its soundtrack went viral and became an internet phenomenon. The song was composed by her cousin Anirudh Ravichander. She appeared alongside the lead cast and composer in the making of the video. In July 2015, Aishwarya announced she would launch a YouTube channel under the banner of "Ten Entertainment" to exclusively promote original content and short films by aspiring filmmakers.

=== UN ambassador and dance ===
In August 2016, Aishwarya was selected as India's goodwill ambassador for the UN Women organization.

In March 2017, Aishwarya performed Bharatanatyam, a style of Indian classical dance, at the UN headquarters on International Women's Day. Her performance was criticized on social media by professional Bharatanatyam dancers, including popular Indian dancer Anita Ratnam.

=== Directorships ===
She directed the 2024 film Lal Salaam, which starred her father Rajinikanth. In February 2026, she was working on a new project as director, produced by Kannan Ravi Groups. In April 2026, it was reported that the film, Texla, would be headlined by Jai and Suraj Venjaramoodu.

== Personal life ==
On 18 November 2004, Aishwarya married actor Dhanush, with whom she has two sons, born in 2006 and 2010. The couple announced their separation through their respective social media handles on 17 January 2022. In April 2024, they filed for divorce, which was finalised that November. In December 2016, Aishwarya Rajinikanth released her own memoir Standing on An Apple Box: The Story of A Girl Among the Stars.

== Filmography ==
Key
†	Denotes films that have not yet been released

=== As film director ===
Year	Title	Notes	Ref..
2012	3		
2015	Vai Raja Vai		
2017	Cinema Veeran	Documentary	
2024	Lal Salaam		
2027	Texla		

As dubbing artist

- Aayirathil Oruvan (2010) for Reema Sen

== Discography ==
Year	Title	Song	Co-singer(s)	Ref.
2003	Whistle	"Natpae Natpae"	Silambarasan, D. Imman, Uma Mahesh, Roopa Venkat	
2010	Aayirathil Oruvan	"Un Mela Aasadhan"	Dhanush, Andrea Jeremiah	
