= 46th Filmfare Awards South =

Award ceremony for South Indian films

- Date: 24 April 1999
- Site: Lalitha Kala Thoranam, Hyderabad, Andhra Pradesh, India
- Hosted by: Suchitra Pillai

The 46th Filmfare Awards South ceremony, honouring the winners and nominees of the best of South Indian cinema in films released 1998, was held at the Lalitha Kala Thoranam, Public Gardens, Hyderabad, on 24 April 1999.

== Jury ==
| Kannada | Malayalam |
|---|---|
| L. S. Seshagiri Rao; Ponnappa; Veena Sajnani | George Dominique; Parvathy Manorenjini; Venugopal K. Nair |
| Telugu | Tamil |
| C. H. Shailaja; Siva Kumar Reddy; Tej Deep; Appa Rao | N. Krithivasan; P. C. Ramakrishna; Shantha Dananjayan |

== Main awards ==
=== Kannada cinema ===
| Best Film | Best Director |
|---|---|
| Thaayi Saheba | Girish Kasaravalli – Thaayi Saheba |
| Best Actor | Best Actress |
| Ramesh Aravind – Hoomale | Jaimala – Thaayi Saheba |
Best Music Director
Hamsalekha – Yaare Neenu Cheluve

=== Malayalam cinema ===
| Best Film | Best Director |
|---|---|
| Chinthavishtayaya Shyamala | Sreenivasan – Chinthavishtayaya Shyamala |
| Best Actor | Best Actress |
| Balachandra Menon – Samaantharangal | Manju Warrier – Kanmadam |
Best Music Director
Vidyasagar – Summer in Bethlehem

=== Tamil cinema ===
| Best Film | Best Director |
|---|---|
| Natpukkaga | Cheran – Desiya Geetham |
| Best Actor | Best Actress |
| R. Sarathkumar – Natpukkaga | Kausalya – Pooveli |
Best Music Director
A. R. Rahman – Jeans

=== Telugu cinema ===
| Best Film | Best Director |
|---|---|
| Antahpuram | Krishna Vamsi – Antahpuram |
| Best Actor | Best Actress |
| Venkatesh – Ganesh | Soundarya – Antahpuram |
Best Music Director
Mani Sharma – Choodalani Vundi

== Technical Awards ==
| Best Choreography: Suchitra Chandrabose – for Ooyala | Best Art Director: Thotta Tharani – Choodalani Vundi | Best Playback Singer: Vandemataram Srinivas - Aahaa..! (for "Priyurale") |

== Special awards ==
| Special award: Ramoji Rao - from excellent outstanding contributions of south Indian cinema | Lifetime Achievement: Allu Ramalingaiah; Lakshmi | Filmfare Award for Best Female Debut - South: Isha Koppikar - Kadhal Kavithai & En Swasa Kaatre |

== Awards Presentation ==
- Vandemataram Srinivas (Best Playback Singer) Received Award from Mani Ratnam
- Suchitra Chandrabose (Best Choreography) Received Award from Farah Khan
- Thotta Tharani (Best Art Director) Received Award from Neelam Chauhan & Divya Palat
- Isha Koppikar (Best Female Debut) Received Award from M. F. Hussain
- Jaimala (Best Film Kannada) Received Award from V. Madhusudan Rao
- Karunakaran (Best Film Malayalam) Received Award from K. S. Ramarao
- P. Kiran (Best Film Telugu) Received Award from K. Viswanath
- A. M. Rathnam (Best Film Tamil) Received Award from Nagma
- Girish Kasaravalli (Best Director Kannada) Received Award from S. V. Krishna Reddy
- Naveen Vadde Receives Sreenivasan Award (Best Director Malayalam)
- Krishna Vamsi (Best Director Telugu) Received Award from Chiranjeevi
- Cheran (Best Director Tamil) Received Award from D. Rama Naidu
- Hamsalekha (Best Music Director Kannada) Received Award from E. V. V. Satyanarayana
- Vidyasagar (Best Music Director Malayalam) Received Award from D. Suresh Babu
- A. R. Rahman (Best Music Director Tamil) Received Award from Simran
- Mani Sharma (Best Music Director Telugu) Received Award from Kamaal Khan
- Jaimala (Best Actress Kannada) Received Award from Prakash Raj
- Naveen Vadde Receives Manju Warrier Award (Best Actress Malayalam)
- Soundarya (Best Actress Telugu) Received Award from Rekha
- Kausalya (Best Actress Tamil) Received Award from Anupam Kher
- Ramesh Aravind (Best Actor Kannada) Received Award from Aiswarya
- Balachandra Menon (Best Actor Malayalam) Received Award from Khushbu
- Venkatesh (Best Actor Telugu) Received Award from Madhuri Dixit
- R. Sarathkumar (Best Actor Tamil) Received Award from Ramya Krishna
- Ramoji Rao (Special Award) Received Award from A. Madhava Reddy
- Lakshmi (Lifetime Achievement Award) Received Award from N. Chandrababu Naidu & Chiranjeevi
- Allu Ramalingaiah (Lifetime Achievement Award) Received Award from N. Chandrababu Naidu & Chiranjeevi
