= Kanjilassery Maha Siva Temple =

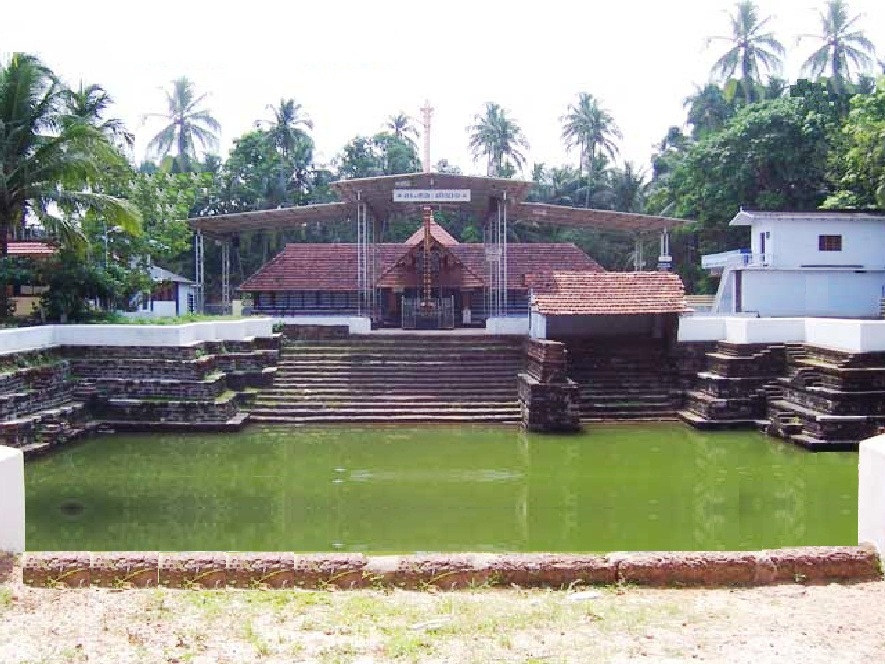
- Temple and Temple Pond

- Kanjilassery Maha Siva Temple, Chemancheri, Kozhikode, Kerala

Religion
- Affiliation: Hinduism
- District: Kozhikode
- Deity: Lord Shiva; Maha Vishnu
- Festivals: Maha Shivaratri, Ashtamirohini

Location
- Location: Chemancheri, Quilandy
- State: Kerala
- Country: India
- Interactive map of Kanjilassery Maha Siva Temple
- Coordinates: 11.404800°N 75.735099°E

Architecture
- Type: Kerala style
- Completed: Not known

Specifications
- Monument: 2
- Elevation: 29.98 m (98 ft)

Kanjilassery Maha Siva Temple is located at Chemancheri village in Kozhikode district, in Kerala, India. The presiding deity of the temple is Lord Shiva, located in main Sanctum Sanctorum, facing west. According to folklore, sage Parashurama has installed the idol. It is the part of the 108 Shiva Temples of Kerala. The temple is located around 4 km away from Pookad Junction on the route of Pokad - Thoraikadavu Road.

== Myths & Beliefs ==
It is also believed that the Kanjilassery Maha Shiva Temple is dedicated to the worship of sage Kashyapa and is believed to be the abode of Lord Shiva. The Rudraa is a form of rhyming Shiva in the time of the sacrifice. Kasi, Kanchipuram, Kanjirangad and Kanjilassery are said to have been built simultaneously with Kanjilassery Siva Temple.

== See also ==
- 108 Shiva Temples
- Temples of Kerala
- Kollam Rameswaram Mahadeva Temple
