= Yamaleela Aa Taruvatha =

Indian television series

- Genre: Soap opera
- Created by: S. V. Krishna Reddy
- Directed by: S. V. Krishna Reddy
- Starring: Ali; Manju Bhargavi; Sonia Singh; Suman; Nikhita; Bhavana
- Country of origin: India
- Original language: Telugu
- No. of seasons: 1
- No. of episodes: (list of episodes)

Production
- Producers: Kommineni Suresh; Ganapathi Rao Kommanapalli (Dialoges)
- Running time: 21 minutes

Original release
- Network: ETV
- Release: 21 September 2020 – 2 April 2022

Yamaleela Aa Taruvatha (transl. 'Yamaleela, after that') is an Indian Telugu-language fantasy drama television series that aired on ETV from 2020 to 2022. Serving as a sequel to the 1994 film Yamaleela, the series features Ali and Manju Bhargavi reprising their roles as Suraj and Suraj's mother, respectively. The story follows the events after the film, centering on Suraj's daughter Chinni, who is adopted by a village woman following the tragic death of her parents in an accident. The narrative focuses on her grandmother's determined efforts to find her.

== Plot ==
The serial picks up after the events of the film Yamaleela. Suraj and his wife Nikhita are traveling through a forest when they are involved in a deadly accident. During this tragic event, their daughter is born. A village woman adopts the infant girl, naming her Chinni. Meanwhile, Suraj's mother, Saradamba, embarks on a relentless search to find her granddaughter. Throughout the series, Suraj's spirit watches over Chinni. The plot revolves around Saradamba's efforts to reunite with her granddaughter and the challenges they face.

== Cast ==
Actor / Actress	Role
Ali	Suraj
Manju Bhargavi	Saradamba
Suman	Yama
Nikita	Suraj's wife
Bhavana	
Sonia Singh	Chinni

== Production ==
Following the success of Yamaleela, director S. V. Krishna Reddy chose to create a soap opera as a follow-up, exploring events that occurred after the film. Ali and Manju Bhargavi reprised their roles as Suraj and his mother Saradamba, respectively. Nikhita was cast as Suraj's wife, while Suman replaced veteran actor Kaikala Satyanarayana as Yama. YouTuber Sonia Singh played the lead role. The show premiered on 21 September 2020.

== Broadcast ==
The show aired on ETV from Monday to Saturday at 8:00 p.m. Episodes were also available on ETV's digital platform, ETV Win, and the ETV Telugu YouTube channel. Premiering on 21 September 2020, the soap opera concluded on 2 April 2022.

== See also ==
- Yamaleela 2
