= Nuvvu Naaku Nachav =

2001 Telugu film by K. Vijaya Bhaskar

Nuvvu Naaku Nachchaav
- Theatrical release poster
- Directed by: K. Vijaya Bhaskar
- Written by: Screenplay: K. Vijaya Bhaskar; Story & Dialogues: Trivikram Srinivas
- Produced by: Sravanthi Ravi Kishore
- Starring: Venkatesh; Aarthi Agarwal
- Cinematography: K. Ravindra Babu
- Edited by: A. Sreekar Prasad
- Music by: Koti
- Production company: Sri Sravanthi Movies
- Distributed by: Suresh Productions
- Release date: 6 September 2001
- Running time: 180 minutes
- Country: India
- Language: Telugu
- Budget: ₹7 crore
- Box office: ₹18 crore distributors' share

Nuvvu Naaku Nachav (transl. I like you) is a 2001 Indian Telugu-language romantic comedy film directed by K. Vijaya Bhaskar who co-wrote the script with Trivikram Srinivas. Produced by Sravanthi Ravi Kishore under the Sri Sravanthi Movies banner, the film stars Venkatesh and Aarthi Agarwal, marking Agarwal's debut in Telugu cinema. The music was composed by Koti. The film follows Venky, a graduate from Anakapalli, who moves to Hyderabad and develops feelings for Nandini, the daughter of his father's friend, despite her being engaged, leading to a complex interplay of love and familial bonds. The film was shot in 85 days.

Released on 6 September 2001, the film received both critical and commercial success, becoming one of the highest-grossing Telugu films of its time. Over the years, it gained recognition for its storytelling and humour, attaining a cult status. The film also marked one of the breakout roles for Sunil, along with Nuvvu Nenu (2001), helping establish him as a leading comedian in the industry.

Nuvvu Naaku Nachav won five Nandi Awards, including Best Home-viewing Feature Film. It was remade in Tamil as Vaseegara (2003) and in Kannada as Gowramma (2005).

== Plot ==
Venkateswarlu "Venky" is an unemployed graduate from Anakapalli who moves to Hyderabad to secure a job at the insistence of his father, Sekharam. Upon his arrival, he resides at the home of Sekharam’s childhood friend, Srinivasa Moorthy. Moorthy’s daughter, Nandini "Nandu," is currently engaged to Prasad, a software professional based in the United States. Venky actively assists the family with the upcoming wedding preparations and quickly develops a warm rapport with the household. Although Venky and Nandu initially share a contentious relationship marked by petty arguments, their mutual animosity gradually evolves into a deep friendship. At Sekharam’s request, Moorthy utilizes his network to help Venky secure employment. Concurrently, Moorthy’s sister, Sujatha, arrives at the house and forms a close bond with her niece, Nandu, often emphasizing the profound significance of choosing a loving lifelong partner.

Over time, Nandu develops romantic feelings for Venky and confesses her love to him. Unwilling to jeopardize the lifelong friendship between their fathers, Venky chooses to quietly leave the house. However, Moorthy intercepts him at the railway station and convinces him to return. Upon his comeback, a conflicted Nandu stops communicating with Venky. Later, Venky accompanies Nandu and her cousin, Pinky, to attend the wedding of Nandu's friend, Asha. Following the ceremony, the group visits an amusement park, where a professional photographer takes a picture of Venky and Nandu intimately holding hands. This trip causes Venky to realize his own love for Nandu; however, he chooses to suppress his emotions and continues to feign indifference.

As the wedding date approaches, Venky takes full responsibility for managing the marriage arrangements. Heartbroken by his apparent detachment, Nandu confides her distress to Sujatha. Sujatha confronts Venky, urging him not to cause Nandu further suffering by denying his true feelings. Sekharam accidentally overhears this conversation, which leaves him deeply moved and speechless.

Complications arise when Prasad's family intercepts the candid photograph taken at the amusement park. Accusing Nandu of having an illicit affair with Venky, they opportunistically demand an additional dowry of ₹1 crore from Moorthy to proceed with the alliance. A furious Moorthy harshly admonishes his daughter, but Sujatha defends her, asserting that reciprocating love is not a moral failing.

Venky personally visits Prasad's family to intercede, pleading with them not to call off the wedding and vouching for Nandu's absolute integrity. When Prasad's family reacts with indifference and greed, an arriving Moorthy intervenes and orders them to leave, officially breaking off the alliance. Moorthy then questions Venky for hiding his emotions. Venky explains that he is entirely prepared to sacrifice his own happiness to preserve the sacred bond of friendship between their families. Profoundly moved by Venky's selflessness and integrity, Moorthy gladly consents to give Nandu's hand in marriage to Venky instead.

On their designated wedding day, the amusement park photographer arrives at the venue and inadvertently solves the mystery of the photograph. He confesses that he had previously handed the picture to the house servant, Banthi, intending for it to be a gift for the groom, under the mistaken impression that Nandu and Venky were the couple getting married. Banthi had subsequently misdelivered the photograph to Prasad. The photographer is stunned to learn that his innocent gesture temporarily dismantled the original wedding, though he is pleased to see that Nandu and Venky are ultimately marrying each other.

== Cast ==
- Venkatesh as C. Venkateswarlu "Venky"
- Aarthi Agarwal as Nandini "Nandu" (voice dubbed by Savitha Reddy)
- Prakash Raj as Pinnamaneni Srinivasa Murthy "Srinu" Nandu's father
- Suhasini as Sujatha, Nandu's aunt (extended cameo appearance)
- Chandra Mohan as C. Sekharam
- Prithvi as Mohan, Asha's fiancé
- Asha Saini as Asha, Nandu's friend
- Tanikella Bharani as Ashok, Prasad's father
- Brahmanandam as Photographer Brahmamurthy
- Babu Mohan as Prasad's relative
- Mallikarjuna Rao as Prasad's relative
- M. S. Narayana as Pinnamaneni Guru Murthy “Chanti”, Nandu's uncle
- Shiju as Prasad, Nandu's fiancé
- Melkote as M.D.
- Sudha as Lakshmi, Nandu's mother
- Hema as Padma, Nandu's aunt and Chanti's wife
- Sudeepa as Pinky, Nandu's Cousin
- Sri Lakshmi as Asha's aunty
- Kalpana Rai as Cook
- Padma Jayanthi as Prasad's mother
- Sunil as Banthi, Nandu's servant
- Bandla Ganesh as Mohan's friend
- Ananth as Asha's uncle
- Chitti Babu as Priest
- Giridhar as Venky's friend
- K. K. Sarma as Priest

== Production ==
=== Development ===
After the success of Nuvve Kavali (2000), producer Sravanthi Ravi Kishore decided to collaborate again with director K. Vijaya Bhaskar and writer Trivikram Srinivas. Impressed by their previous work, he had already given them an advance for their next film, which became Nuvvu Naaku Nachav. Vijaya Bhaskar and Trivikram were tasked with crafting a family-oriented story. They completed the script in two months, and it received unanimous approval from the team for its strong narrative.

Since much of the film is set within a single house, outdoor sequences were added to provide variety. This led to the inclusion of the Ooty episode and Asha Saini's wedding scenes. Similarly, Brahmanandam's character, which was not part of the original script, was included to add humour and variety to the second half of the film. The character was inspired by Mr. Bean's comedic style. The dinner scene in the film was influenced by a similar scene from Meet the Parents (2000).

=== Casting ===
Initially, there were discussions about casting actor Tarun in the lead role, but due to the requirement for strong comedic timing and emotional depth, the team decided to opt for a different actor. At this point, producer Suresh Babu informed Sravanthi Ravi Kishore about the availability of actor Venkatesh’s dates. Vijaya Bhaskar and Trivikram then presented the story to Venkatesh, who expressed interest, and the film went into production.

For the female lead, actresses such as Trisha and Gajala were initially considered, but ultimately, Aarthi Agarwal, who had previously acted in a Hindi film, was chosen. Nuvvu Naaku Nachav marked her Telugu debut.

For the role of the heroine's father, director Vijaya Bhaskar suggested Nassar, but producer Sravanthi Ravi Kishore insisted on casting Prakash Raj. Due to a ban on Prakash Raj by the Movie Artists Association (MAA), scenes without his character were filmed first. Once the ban was lifted, Prakash Raj joined the shoot and completed his scenes in 17 days.

=== Filming ===
A house set, designed by art director Peketi Ranga, was constructed at Ramanaidu Studios in Nanakramguda, costing around ₹60 lakh. This set became a key location in the film. The song "Naa Choope Ninu" was described by Vijaya Bhaskar as a "haunting tune," which led the team to shoot it abroad. Filmed in New Zealand for its vibrant and picturesque landscapes, the cold weather presented challenges, especially for Venkatesh, who had to wear light costumes.

Filming was completed in just 64 days. The total production cost of Nuvvu Naaku Nachav was ₹4.5 crore, excluding Venkatesh's fee of ₹2.5 crore.

=== Post-production ===
After filming concluded, re-recording began with composer Koti. Initially, the result did not meet producer Sravanthi Ravi Kishore's expectations. However, after revising the work, Koti delivered a version that satisfied Ravi Kishore. Koti completed the re-recording in 25 days.

The film was released with a runtime of over three hours. Concerns were raised regarding its length, particularly about the episode featuring Suhasini, which was suggested for removal. However, Sravanthi Ravi Kishore insisted on retaining every scene, ensuring that not a single scene was cut.

== Music ==
Nuvvu Naaku Nachchav

Film score by Koti
- Released: 2001
- Genre: Soundtrack
- Length: 29:17
- Label: Aditya Music
- Producer: Koti

Koti chronology
Naalo Unna Prema (2001)	Nuvvu Naaku Nachchav (2001)	Adhipathi (2001)

The soundtrack for Nuvvu Naaku Nachav was composed by Koti and released by Aditya Music. It quickly achieved triple platinum disc status upon its release.

"Okkasari Cheppaleva" is based on the Robert Miles' song "Fable". For the same song, lyricist Sirivennela Seetharama Sastry penned 60 different versions of the pallavi. Ultimately, the first version was finalised for the film.

"Naa Choope Ninu" was sung by Sriram Prabhu, marking his playback debut for Venkatesh. An alternate version was recorded with a North Indian singer, but the team ultimately chose Sriram Prabhu’s rendition as it was deemed more suitable.

No.	Title	Lyrics	Singer(s)	Length
1.	"Unna Mata Cheppaneevu"	Sirivennela Seetharama Sastry	Tippu, Harini	4:43
2.	"O Navvu Chalu"	Sirivennela Seetharama Sastry	Shankar Mahadevan	4:48
3.	"Aakasam Dhigi Vachi"	Sirivennela Seetharama Sastry	S. P. Balasubrahmanyam	5:10
4.	"Naa Choope Ninu"	Sirivennela Seetharama Sastry	K. S. Chithra, Sriram Prabhu	4:15
5.	"O Priyathama"	Bhuvanachandra	S. P. Balasubrahmanyam	5:17
6.	"Okkasari Cheppaleva"	Sirivennela Seetharama Sastry	K. S. Chithra, Kumar Sanu	5:11
Total length:				29:17

== Release ==
Nuvvu Naaku Nachav was released on 6 September 2001, with the date announced three months in advance. Producer Sravanthi Ravi Kishore adopted a transparent approach by allowing distributors to preview the film's rushes and arrange screenings upon request. The film had a wide release with 113 prints across 147 centres, marking the largest release of Venkatesh's career at the time.

== Reception ==
=== Box office ===
The film had a theatrical business of ₹7.24 crore and earned a distributors' share of ₹2.63 crore in its opening week. It eventually collected a total distributors' share of ₹18 crore during its entire theatrical run, emerging as the third highest-grossing Telugu film at the time.

The film had a 50-day run in 93 centres and a 100-day run in 57 centres. It also celebrated a 175-day run in three centres.

=== Critical reception ===
Idlebrain.com rated the film 4/5, and was in praise of the performances of the lead cast and the screenplay. "The strength of the film is Venky, Aarti, the comedy dialogues and sensible direction," the reviewer added. Sify which rated 3 stars out of 5, criticised the film for "lack of freshness", and "weak screenplay," and opined that the film resembles a "wedding album."

== Legacy ==
Nuvvu Naaku Nachav is considered one of the most celebrated comedies in Venkatesh's career and is regarded as a classic of early 2000s Telugu cinema. The character of Banthi, portrayed by Sunil, became particularly popular, contributing to his rise as one of the leading comedians in the industry.

The film's dialogues and comedy scenes have become iconic, and it continues to garner high ratings during frequent television broadcasts.

== Remakes ==
The film was remade in Tamil as Vaseegara (2003) and in Kannada as Gowramma (2005).

== Awards ==
Nandi Awards

- Best Home-viewing Feature Film - Sravanthi Ravi Kishore
- Best Supporting Actress - Suhasini
- Best Female Dubbing Artist - Savitha Reddy
- Best Dialogue Writer - Trivikram Srinivas
- Best Choreographer - Suchitra
