= Kalyatanda Ponnappa =

17th-century warrior-god of Kodagu

Kalyatanda Ponnappa was a 17th-century warrior of Kodagu (Coorg). Since he was deified after his death, the people of Kodagu consider him to be a god. He is also known as Kaliat-Achchappa or Kaliat Ajjappa.

== Early life ==
Ponnappa was born in the Kalyatanda (aka Kaliatanda) family as the son of Kuttayya of Naalnaad (Nalknad). Ponnappa's parents were ardent devotees of Igguthappa.

G Richter calls him ‘a Malayalam man who came to Coorg many generations ago, (and) got naturalized.’ A Malayali-Kodava by birth, Ponnappa was also associated with the Malayalam land (Kerala). His forefathers had lived in Kerala and Ponnappa himself had studied tantric magic in Kerala. Kalyatanda Ponnappa had both Kodava and Malayalam origins, but was considered a Kodava warrior and is now revered as a deity by the Kodava people, but not particularly so by Malayali people.

His agrarian father was upset that Ponnappa didn't look after the fields. So Kuttayya told his wife not to feed Ponnappa and broke Ponnappa's bow. Upset with this, Ponnappa left home. Ponnappa was betrothed to his aunt's daughter. He also had a friend and assistant called Katala Boltu.

== Career ==
=== Skirmishes ===
Ponnappa became the most powerful man in Naalnaad (Nalknad) and its chosen leader as well. He led the region in battles against neighbouring lords. He fought with many powerful men and killed several of them. Ponnappa was a contemporary of Vira Raja, the first king of Kodagu. Ponnappa acknowledged Vira Raja's overlordship. But, the neighbouring lord, Karnayya Bavu of Bhagamandala did not acknowledge Vira Raja as the king. Karnayya raised a stealth army against the Raja.

The Raja gave Ponnappa his gun, sword and a privy army of 500 guards. Karnayya wanted to befriend Ponnappa and make him an ally. Karnayya himself had an army of men carrying matchlocks, swords, bows and arrows. However, Ponnappa refused his friendship (not wishing to betray the Raja) thus insulting Karnayya and making him an enemy.

=== Practise ===
Ponnappa was a practitioner of ritual magic, divination and occult. He was considered to be a sort of warlock or magician, since he was believed to be an expert at wizardry and to be able to perform many miracles. People held him in great awe and claimed that he was to manipulate supernatural beings. He held a practise where devotees came to him with their problems and he solved them. This way he was feared by some and respected in Kodagu.

== Death ==
Ponnappa was once poisoned by an old woman, but he managed to survive. Afterwards, he visited his fiancée at her home, the Kuttanjetira house in Beth village. However, his enemies surrounded the place at night and attacked him. The army of body-guards the Raja had provided him were resting at another distant village at that time. Single-handedly he fought and killed a number of the enemies, until he was fatally shot near what would later become the Kacheri (office) of Nalknad taluk. Badly wounded, Ponnappa dragged himself to the Makki temple where he died. It was Karnayya's men who had surrounded Ponnappa and killed him in the darkness. Later, Vira Raja captured Karnayya Bavu and executed him.

== Legacy ==
After his death, his spirit was believed to possess many men who displayed the magic arts that he practised. Ponnappa is a legendary figure in Kodagu where folk ballads are sung about him. Festival performances are held in his honour in the Makki temple near Napoka (Napoklu) and in other temples.
