= Filmfare Award for Best Choreography – South =

Indian annual film award

- Awarded for: Best work by a dance choreographer in films
- Country: India
- Presented by: Filmfare
- First award: 2002
- Currently held by: Sekhar for "Kurchi Madathapetti" from Guntur Kaaram (2024)

Highlights
- Most wins: Prem Rakshith and Sekhar (6)

The Filmfare Award for Best Choreography is given by the Filmfare magazine as part of its annual Filmfare Awards South for Telugu, Tamil, Malayalam and Kannada films.

== Winners ==
Year	Choreographer	Film	Song	Language	Ref.
2024	Sekhar	Guntur Kaaram	"Kurchi Madathapetti"	Telugu
2023	Prem Rakshith	Dasara	"Dhoom Dhaam Dosthaan"	Telugu
2022	Prem Rakshith	RRR	"Naatu Naatu"	Telugu
2020 / 21	Sekhar	Ala Vaikunthapurramuloo	"Ramuloo Ramulaa"	Telugu
2020 / 21	Dinesh	Master	"Vaathi Coming"	Tamil
2020 / 21	Jani	Yuvarathnaa	"Feel the Power"	Kannada
2019	AWARDS FUNCTION WAS SUSPENDED DUE TO COVID-19 PANDEMIC
2018	Jani	Maari 2	"Rowdy Baby"	Tamil
2018	Prabhu Deva	Maari 2	"Rowdy Baby"	Tamil
2017	Sekhar	Fidaa	"Vachinde"	Telugu
2017	Sekhar	Khaidi No. 150	"Ammadu Let Do Kummudu"	Telugu
2016	Sekhar	Janatha Garage	"Apple Beauty"	Telugu
2015	Sekhar	Bruce Lee: The Fighter	"Kung Fu Kumaari"	Telugu
2014	Shobi	Kaththi	All songs	Tamil
2013	Sekhar	Iddarammayilatho	"Top Lechipoddi"	Telugu
2012	Jani	Racha	"Dillaku Dillaku"	Telugu
2011	Prem Rakshith	Badrinath	"Nath Nath"	Telugu
2010	Raju Sundaram	Brindavanam	"Eyi Raaja"	Telugu
2010	Baba Bhaskar	Singam	"Kadhal Vandhale"	Tamil
2009	Prem Rakshith	Arya 2	"Mr. Perfect"	Telugu
2009	Dinesh	Ayan		Tamil
2008	Prem Rakshith	Kantri	"Vayasunami" & "I go crazy"	Telugu
2007	Prem Rakshith	Azhagiya Tamil Magan	"Ellappugazhum"	Tamil
2006	Raghava Lawrence	Style	"Rara Rara Rammantunna"	Telugu
2005	Prabhu Deva	Nuvvostanante Nenoddantana	"Chandrulo"	Telugu
2004	Raju Sundaram	Ghilli	'"Appadi Podu"	Tamil
2003	Brinda	Kaaka Kaaka	"Thoodu Varuma" and "Uyirin Uyire"	Tamil
2002	Raghava Lawrence	Indra	"Daayi Daayi Daama"	Telugu
2001	Raghava Lawrence	Paarthale Paravasam	"Love Check"	Tamil
2000	Raghava Lawrence	Annayya	"Aata Kavala"	Telugu
1999	Chinni Prakash	Mudhalvan		Tamil
1998	Suchitra Chandrabose	Ooyala		Telugu
1997	Brinda	Preminchukundam Raa		Telugu

== Superlatives ==
Superlative	Cinematographer	Record
Most wins	Prem Rakshith	6
Most wins	Sekhar	6
Most consecutive wins	Raghava Lawrence	3
Most consecutive wins	Sekhar	3
Most wins in a single language	Sekhar	6 (Telugu)

== See also ==
- Filmfare Award for Best Choreography
- Filmfare Award for Best Choreography – Marathi
