= Kantri =

2008 Indian Telugu-language action film

- Theaterical release poster
- Directed by: Meher Ramesh
- Written by: Meher Ramesh
- Produced by: C. Ashwini Dutt
- Starring: N. T. Rama Rao Jr; Hansika Motwani; Tanishaa
- Cinematography: Sameer Reddy
- Edited by: Marthand K. Venkatesh
- Music by: Mani Sharma
- Production company: Vyjayanthi Movies
- Release date: 9 May 2008
- Running time: 166 minutes
- Country: India
- Language: Telugu

Kantri (lit. 'Cunning') is a 2008 Indian Telugu-language action comedy film written and directed by Meher Ramesh and produced by C. Ashwini Dutt under Vyjayanthi Movies. The film stars N. T. Rama Rao Jr. in the lead role, alongside Hansika Motwani and Tanishaa, Prakash Raj, Ashish Vidyarthi, Mukesh Rishi, Sayaji Shinde and Kota Srinivasa Rao. The film follows Kranthi, an orphan, who shoots to success in the underworld and becomes crime lord PR's blue-eyed boy. But his meteoric rise hides a secret mission, to destroy the empire from within.

The film was initially scheduled to release on 28 April 2008. However, it was released 12 days later. The film was released on 9 May 2008. Upon release, the film received mixed to negative reviews from critics and audiences. Despite the reviews, the film took a good opening, and became a hit at the box office. Kantri is also the first Indian film to feature a 3D animated character based on an actor.

== Plot ==
NRI Krishna returns to his village with his wife and child to work for the upliftment of the village folk. However, when the family along with his old father, is on its way home with the money, Pothuraju aka PR betrays everyone by killing them and running away with the money, leaving his wife and son behind. Pothuraju is presently the head of a business empire and is known for his nefarious connections and illegal dealings. He is supported at every step by his friend and partner Seshu. Enters Kantri who enters Pothuraju's gang to earn money for the orphanage where he grew up (he was orphaned at a very young age). Kantri falls in love with Varalakshmi. However, she initially does not like Kantri but eventually falls for.his good nature.

An ambitious Kantri rises fast in life and meets Pothuraju in Hong Kong. However, an issue arises which separates Kantri from Pothuraju's gang. He takes money from Das to kill Pothuraju. Before he has his chance to do so, he is told that Pothuraju is his father. The hatred turns into attachment and Seshu's daughter Priya falls in love with Kantri but backs off after learning that Kantri and Varalakshmi love each other. However, some differences arise between PR and Seshu leading to their friendship turning into enemity. Seshu eventually joins Das and his gang with the purpose of killing PR and Kantri to gain all their wealth. A surprise twist in the climax reveals that Kantri is actually the son of Krishna who was betrayed & killed by PR in the beginning of the film. Kantri's grandfather is also revealed to be alive having escaped PR's attack with his grandson. It is revealed that Kantri entered PR's empire to avenge his parents' murders and to get hold of all the wealth that PR earned by his sins. PR is shocked by this revelation. He is further shocked when Kantri reveals that Bhyraagi is his old friend and the son of PR's old henchman Shiva who was also killed by PR. Kantri further reveals that Bhyraagi joined him in his mission to make amends for his father's sins. It is also revealed that Kantri is the one who planned PR's separation from Seshu making him a loner. Seshu is shocked when PR informs him that Kantri is not his son but the son of Krishna whom he killed. PR and Seshu rejoin forces to get revenge against Kantri. They brutally attack Bhyraagi and abduct Chinna. Bhyraagi dies in Kantri's hands after telling him to rescue Chinna. Kantri is shattered by Bhyraagi's death. Filled with rage, he brutally slaughters Das, Seshu and all of their goons. Kantri brutally attacks and injures PR. In the end, PR threatens to kill Chinna only to learn that he is his real son. PR is shocked when Kantri tells him that Chinna was brought up by his grandfather following the death of PR's wife. Kantri also tells PR that he has been treating Chinna as his younger brother and taking good care of him. PR is devastated to learn that all his sins have affected Chinna. The film ends with Kantri killing PR who proceeded to attack him & leaving the place with Chinna.

== Cast ==
- N. T. Rama Rao Jr as Kranthi (Kantri)
- Hansika Motwani as Varalakshmi / Hamsa
- Tanishaa as Priya
- Prakash Raj as PR / Pothuraju
- Ashish Vidyarthi as Seshu
- Kota Srinivasa Rao as Daiva Sahayam
- Mukesh Rishi as Kantri's grandfather
- Sayaji Shinde as Das
- Brahmanandam as Brahmi
- Ali as Chang Lee
- Sunil as Rajni Haasan
- Murali Sharma as Veeru
- Subbaraju as Bairagi
- Brahmaji as Das's Right Hand
- Raghu Babu as Acid Durga
- Jaya Prakash Reddy as Home Minister Ranga Reddy
- Raja Ravindra as Ranga Reddy's PA
- Krishna Bhagawan as Singapore Simhachalam
- Prudhviraj as Settlement Raju
- Gundu Hanumantha Rao as Devaraju
- Srinivasa Reddy as Cutting Seenu
- Prabhas Sreenu as Spider Reddy
- M. S. Narayana as Thelupu Ramakrishna
- Master Bharath as Rambo
- Rajendran as Das's Henchman
- Hema
- G. V. Sudhakar Naidu as Shivudu
- Venu Yeldandi

== Production ==
Ramesh told Idlebrain.com in an interview that the Kantri's script and title was narrated to Puri Jagannadh in Manali during the shoot of Desamuduru, who registered the title and immediately registered it under the Vaishno banner. C. Aswini Dutt came onboard as producer, while Jr. NTR was chosen to play the role of a 25-year-old tapori character after a single read-through. NTR's costumes were made before the shoot with none costing more than ₹1,500.

The film's shooting started in October 2007 but was delayed for a month as cinematographer Sameer Reddy was busy with Athidhi. The film was mainly shot in Hong Kong and Dubai with a part also shot in Singapore, including places where The Dark Knight had been shot a few days earlier. The film extensively showcases the Hong Kong skyline and was also shot at the Hong Kong International Airport. Certain songs of the film were shot in Cape Town, the first Telugu film to be shot there after Badri.

== Music ==
Kantri

Soundtrack album by Mani Sharma
- Released: 29 March 2008 (India)
- Recorded: 2008
- Genre: Feature film soundtrack
- Length: 27:49
- Label: Aditya Music
- Producer: Mani Sharma

Mani Sharma chronology
| Pourudu (2007) | Kantri (2008) | Parugu (2008) |

Released on 29 March 2008, Kantri's soundtrack was composed by Mani Sharma whilst lyrics were penned by five different lyricists: Meher Ramesh, Ananth Sreeram, Sirivennela, Veturi, and Ramajogayya Sastry. The hip-hop song "123" is based on "Get Buck" by Young Buck and was the first one to be composed when Sharma was in the US. The song "Vayassunamy" was a remake of Sharma's previous song "Vasantha Mullai" from Pokkiri, which itself is remix of a song from Sarangadhara (1958).

| No | Song | Singer(s) | Duration | Lyricist |
|---|---|---|---|---|
| 1 | 123 Nenoka Kantri | N. T. Rama Rao Jr., Naveen Madhav, Karunya | 04:31 | Meher Ramesh |
| 2 | Ammaho | Karthik, K. S. Chithra | 05:16 | Sirivennela |
| 3 | Vayasunamy | Vedala Hemachandra, Sunitha Upadrashta | 04:04 | Veturi |
| 4 | I Go Crazy | Rahul Nambiar, Janani Madhan (Jey) | 04:48 | Anantha Sreeram |
| 5 | Janthar Manthar | Ranjith, Rita | 04:25 | Anantha Sreeram |
| 6 | Raamare | Shankar Mahadevan, Sunidhi Chauhan | 04:45 | Ramajogayya Sastry |

== Reception ==
Rediff gave two and half stars said "Meher has nothing new to offer. He does take the beaten path in making a hero-centric film with the theme of good versus evil and the usual masala elements. NTR stands out with his looks and talent. Hansika, as the lead heroine makes a pretty picture. In short Kantri is NTR's show all the way". greatandhra and idlebrain rated three stars, with the former saying "The film is for mass cum class audiences. Technically the film stands on the summit. Leaving the length part and less-comedy part aside, the film is a well-made one", and the latter describing "The plus points of the film are NTR's energizing performance (dialogues, dances and emotions) and the first half. The twist towards climax is interesting".

== Awards ==
Filmfare Awards South

- Best Choreography - Prem Rakshith for the song "Vayasunami"

Nandi Awards

- Best Choreographer – Prem Rakshit for the song "Vayasunami"

South Scope Awards

- Best stylish actor – Jr NTR
- Best stylish choreography – Raju Sundaram ("123 Nenoka Kantri")
