= 66th Filmfare Awards South =

Award ceremony for South Indian films

- Date: 21 December 2019
- Site: Chennai, Tamil Nadu, India

Highlights
- Best Picture: KGF (Kannada); Sudani from Nigeria (Malayalam); Pariyerum Perumal (Tamil); Mahanati (Telugu)
- Most awards: Rangasthalam (Telugu) - 5; 96 (Tamil) - 5
- Most nominations: Rangasthalam (Telugu), 10

The 66th Filmfare Awards South ceremony honoring the winners and nominees of the best of South Indian cinema in 2018 is an event that was held on 21 December 2019 in Chennai. The nominations for all the main awards were announced on 13 December 2019. The Awards show premiered on 26 January 2020 on Star Suvarna and Star Suvarna HD.

== List of winners and nominees ==
=== Main awards ===
==== Kannada cinema ====
Best Film	Best Director
KGF; Ammachi Yemba Nenapu; Nathicharami; Sarkari Hi. Pra. Shaale, Kasaragodu, Koduge: Ramanna Rai; Tagaru	Mansore – Nathicharami; Karthik Saragur – Jeerjimbe; Prashanth Neel – KGF; Rishab Shetty – Sarkari Hi. Pra. Shaale, Kasaragodu, Koduge: Ramanna Rai; Suri – Tagaru
Best Actor	Best Actress
Yash – KGF as Raja Krishnappa Bairya aka Rocky; Diganth – Katheyondu Shuruvagide as Tarun Manchale; Ganesh – Orange as Santhosh; Sathish Ninasam – Ayogya as Siddha; Shivrajkumar – Tagaru as ACP Shivakumar / 'Tagaru' Shiva	Manvitha Kamath – Tagaru as Punarvasu; Ashika Ranganath – Raambo 2 as Mayuri; Meghana Raj – Iruvudellava Bittu as Poorvi; Nishvika Naidu -Amma I Love You as Bindhu; Sruthi Hariharan – Nathicharami as Gowri
Best Supporting Actor	Best Supporting Actress
Dhananjay – Tagaru as Dolly; Achyuth Kumar – Choori Katte; Ashwin Rao Pallakki – Katheyondu Shuruvagide as Pedro; P. Ravishankar – Raambo 2 as Joker; Radhakrishna Urala – Ammachi Yemba Nenapu as Puttamatte	Sharanya – Nathicharami as Suma; Shreya Anchan – Katheyondu Shuruvagide as Swarna; Sudharani – Life Jothe Ondh Selfie as Thulsi; Sumalatha – Thayige Thakka Maga as Parvathi; Suman Nagarkar – Jeerjimbe
Best Music Director	Best Lyricist
Vasuki Vaibhav – Sarkari Hi. Pra. Shaale, Kasaragodu, Koduge: Ramanna Rai; Arjun Janya – Ayogya; Charanraj – Tagaru; Guru Kiran – Amma I Love You; Ravi Basrur – KGF	H. S. Venkateshamurthy – Sakkareya Paakadali from Hasiru Ribbon; Jayant Kaikini – "Badukina Bannave" from Tagaru; Kiran Kaverappa – "Bhavaloka" from Nathicharami; Trilok Trivikram – "Praveena Praveena" from Sarkari Hi. Pra. Shaale, Kasaragodu, Koduge: Ramanna Rai; V. Nagendra Prasad – "Amma Nannee Januma" from "Amma I Love You"
Best Playback Singer – Male	Best Playback Singer – Female
Sanjith Hegde – "Shakunthale" – Naduve Antharavirali; Anthony Daasan – "Tagaru Banthu Tagaru" from Tagaru; Kailash Kher – "Anna Nanna Hesaru" from The Villain; Sunil Kashyap – "Amma Nannee Januma" from Amma I Love You; Vijay Prakash – "Yenammi Yenammi" from Ayogya	Bindu Malini – "Bhavalokada" from Nathicharami; Aditi Sagar – "Dum Maro Dum" from Raambo 2; Ananya Bhat – "Hold On Hold On" from Tagaru; Anuradha Bhat – "Holeva Holeyachage" – Ammachi Yemba Nenapu; Madhuri Sheshadri – "Nooraru Bannagalu" from Sarkari Hi. Pra. Shaale, Kasaragodu, Koduge: Ramanna Rai
Critics Best Actor	Critics Best Actress
Sathish Ninasam – Ayogya	Shruti Hariharan – Nathicharami

==== Malayalam cinema ====
Best Film	Best Director
Sudani From Nigeria; Ee.Ma.Yau; Eeda; Joseph; Njan Prakashan	Lijo Jose Pellissery – Ee.Ma.Yau; Anjali Menon – Koode; M. Padmakumar – Joseph; Madhupal – Oru Kuprasidha Payyan; Zakariya Mohammed – Sudani From Nigeria
Best Actor	Best Actress
Joju George – Joseph as Joseph Parekkatil; Chemban Vinod Jose – Ee.Ma.Yau as Eeshi; Jayasurya – Captain as V. P. Sathyan; Prithviraj – Koode as Joshua Thomas; Soubin Shahir – Sudani From Nigeria as Majeed; Tovino Thomas – Theevandi as Bineesh Damodaran	Manju Warrier – Aami as Kamala Surayya; Aishwarya Lekshmi – Varathan as Priya Paul; Anu Sithara – Captain as Anitha Sathyan; Nazriya – Koode as Jennifer Maria Thomas; Nimisha Sajayan – Eeda as Aishwarya Gopal; Sai Pallavi – Athiran as Nithya Lakshmi
Best Supporting Actor	Best Supporting Actress
Vinayakan – Ee.Ma.Yau as Ayyappan; Ranjith – Koode as Aloshy; Sharafudheen – Varathan as Josey; Sidhique – Hey Jude as Dominic Aldo Rodrigues; Sudheesh – Theevandi as Sugunan	Savithri Sreedharan – Sudani From Nigeria as Jameela; Muthumani – Uncle as Lakshmi; Nimisha Sajayan – Oru Kuprasidha Payyan as Adv. Hannah Elizabeth; Pauly Valsan – Ee.Ma.Yau as Pennamma; Sarala Balussery – Sudani From Nigeria as Beeyumma
Best Music Director	Best Lyricist
Kailas Menon – Theevandi; Gopi Sundar – Captain; Shaan Rahman – Aravindante Athidhikal; Sushin Shyam – Varathan; Vishal Bharadwaj – Carbon	B. K.Harinarayanan – "Jeevamshamayi" from Theevandi; Ajeesh Dasan – "Ini Orukalathe" from Poomaram; Anwar Ali – "Mizhi Niranju" from Eeda; Anil Panachooran – "Nenchinullilaake" from Thattumpurath Achuthan; Rafeeque Ahmed – "Neer Neermathalam" from Aami
Best Playback Singer – Male	Best Playback Singer – Female
Vijay Yesudas – "Poomuthole" from Joseph; Abhay Jodhpurkar – "Minnaminni" from Koode; Haricharan – "Mullappuvithalo" from Abrahaminte Santhathikal; Karthik – "Vanville" from Koode; Karthik – "Kadavathoru Thoni" from Poomaram	Anne Amie – "Aararo" from Koode; Megha Josekutty – "Endhe Kanna" from Aravindante Athidhikal; Neha Nair – "Ponnumkasavitta" from Queen; Shreya Ghoshal – "Palthira" from Captain; Shreya Ghoshal – "Maanam Thudukkanu" – Odiyan
Critics Best Actor	Critics Best Actress
Soubin Shahir – Sudani from Nigeria	Nimisha Sajayan – Eeda

==== Tamil cinema ====
Best Film	Best Director
Pariyerum Perumal; 96; Chekka Chivantha Vaanam; Ratsasan; Sarkar; Vada Chennai	Ram Kumar – Ratsasan; A. R. Murugadoss – Sarkar; Mani Ratnam – Chekka Chivantha Vaanam; Mari Selvaraj – Pariyerum Perumal; Prem Kumar – 96; Vetrimaran – Vada Chennai
Best Actor	Best Actress
Dhanush – Vada Chennai as Anbu (tie); Vijay Sethupathi – 96 as Ramachandran; Aravind Swamy – Chekka Chivantha Vaanam as Varadharajan Senapathi; Jayam Ravi – Adanga Maru as Subash; Vijay – Sarkar as Sundar Ramaswamy	Trisha Krishnan – 96 as Janaki Devi; Aishwarya Rajesh – Kanaa as Kousalya Murugesan; Jyotika – Kaatrin Mozhi as Vijayalakshmi Balakrishnan; Nayantara – Kolamavu Kokila as Kokila; Sai Pallavi – Maari 2 Aanandi Maariyappan
Best Supporting Actor	Best Supporting Actress
Sathyaraj – Kanaa as Murugesan; Akshay Kumar – 2.0 as Pakshi Rajan; Anurag Kashyap – Imaikkaa Nodigal as ACP Martin Roy; Arun Vijay – Chekka Chivantha Vaanam as Thyagarajan Senapathi; Samuthirakani – Kaala as Vaaliyappan; Yogi Babu – Kolamavu Kokila as Shekhar	Saranya Ponvannan – Kolamavu Kokila; Eswari Rao – Kaala as Selvi; Priya Bhavani Shankar – Kadaikutty Singam as Poompozhil Chellamma; Ramya Krishnan – Thaana Serndha Kootam as Azhagu Meena; Varalaxmi Sarathkumar – Sarkar
Best Music Director	Best Lyricist
Govind Vasantha – 96; Anirudh Ravichandran – Kolamavu Kokila; A. R. Rahman – Chekka Chivantha Vaanam; Santhosh Narayanan – Pariyerum Perumal; Yuvan Shankar Raja – Pyaar Prema Kaadhal	Karthik Netha – "Kadhale Kadhale" from 96; Gkb – "Vaayadi Petthapulla" from Kanaa; Madhan Karky – "Kurumba" from Tik Tik Tik; Vignesh Shivan – "Sodakku" from Thaana Serndha Kootam; Vivek – "Pottakati Poovasam" from Pariyerum Perumal
Best Playback Singer – Male	Best Playback Singer – Female
Sid Sriram – "Hey Penne" from Pyaar Prema Kaadhal; Anirudh Ravichandran – "Kalyana Vayasu" from Kolamavu Kokila; Anthony Daasan – "Sodakku" from Thaana Serndha Kootam; Dhanush – "Rowdy Baby" from Maari 2; Raghu Dixit, Sathya Prakash, Jithin Raj – "Neeyum Naanum Anbe" – Imaikkaa Nodigal	Chinmayi – "Kaathale Kathale" from 96; Dhee – "Rowdy Baby" from Maari 2; Jonita Gandhi – "Omg Ponnu" from Sarkar; Shakthisree Gopalan – "Bhoomi Bhoomi" from Chekka Chivantha Vaanam; Shashaa Tirupati – "Endhira Logathu" from 2.0
Critics Best Actor	Critics Best Actress
Arvind Swami – Chekka Chivantha Vaanam	Aishwarya Rajesh – Kanaa

==== Telugu cinema ====
Best Film	Best Director
Mahanati; Bharat Ane Nenu; C/o Kancharapalem; Geetha Govindam; Rangasthalam; Sammohanam	Nag Ashwin – Mahanati; Koratala Siva – Bharat Ane Nenu; Mohan Krishna Indraganti – Sammohanam; Parasuram – Geetha Govindam; Sukumar – Rangasthalam; Venkatesh Maha – C/o Kancharapalem
Best Actor	Best Actress
Ram Charan – Rangasthalam as Chelluboina Chittibabu; Dulquer Salman – Mahanati as Gemini Ganesan; Mahesh Babu – Bharath Ane Nenu as Bharat Ram; N. T. Rama Rao Jr. – Aravinda Sametha Veera Raghava as Veera Raghava Reddy; Vijay Devarakonda – Geetha Govindam as Vijay Govind	Keerthi Suresh – Mahanati as Savitri; Aditi Rao Hydari – Sammohanam as Sameera Rathode; Anushka Shetty – Bhaagamathie as Bhaagamathie / Chanchala IAS; Pooja Hegde – Aravinda Sametha Veera Raghava as Aravinda; Rashmika Mandanna – Geetha Govindam as Geetha; Samantha Akkineni – Rangasthalam as Ramalakshmi
Best Supporting Actor	Best Supporting Actress
Jagapati Babu – Aravinda Sametha Veera Raghava as Basi Reddy; Aadhi Pinisetty – Rangasthalam as Chelluboina Kumar Babu; Doddanna – Aatagadharaa Siva as Jangayya; Mohan Bhagat – C/o Kancharapalem as Gaddam; Naresh – Sammohanam as Sarvesh; R. Madhavan – Savyasachi as Arun Raj Verma; Rahul Ramakrishna – Geetha Govindam as Ramakrishna	Anasuya Bharadwaj – Rangasthalam as Kolli Rangamma; Asha Sarath – Bhaagamathie as Vaishnavi Natarajan; Malavika Nair – Taxiwala as Sisira Bharadwaj; Mehreen Pirzada – Kavacham as Lavanya; Praveena Paruchuri – C/o Kancharapalem as Saleema; Samantha Akkineni – Mahanati as Madhuravani
Best Music Director	Best Lyricist
Devi Sri Prasad – Rangasthalam; Gopi Sunder – Geetha Govindam; Mickey J Meyer – Mahanati; S. Thaman – Aravinda Sametha Veera Raghava; Sweekar Agasthi – C/o Kancharapalem; Vivek Sagar – Sammohanam	Chandra Bose – "Entha Sakkagunnavey" from Rangasthalam; Anantha Sreeram – "Inkem Inkem Kavaale" from Geetha Govindam; Chaitanya Prasad – "Pillaa Raa" from RX 100; Ramajogayya Sastry – "Peniviti" from Aravinda Sametha Veera Raghava; Sirivennela Sitarama Sastry – "Chivaraku Migiledi" from Mahanati
Best Playback Singer – Male	Best Playback Singer – Female
Sid Sriram – "Inkem Inkem Kavaali" from Geetha Govindam; Anurag Kulkarni – "Pillaa Raa" from RX 100; Anurag Kulkarni – "Aasha Paasham" from C/o Kancharapalem; Armaan Malik – "Ninnila Ninnila" from Tholi Prema; Kaala Bhairava – "Peniviti" from Aravinda Sametha Veera Raghava; Rahul Sipligunj – "Rangaa Rangaa Rangasthalaana" from Rangasthalam	Shreya Ghoshal – "Mandaraa Mandaraa" from Bhaagamathie; Ananya Bhat – "Yettagayya Shiva Shiva" from Aatagadharaa Siva; Chinmayi – "Yenti Yenti"- Geetha Govindam; M. M. Manasi – "Rangamma Mangamma" – Rangasthalam; Mohana Bhogaraju – "Reddamma Thalli" from Aravinda Sametha Veera Raghava; Ramya Behara – "Gelupu Leni Samaram" from Mahanati
Critics Best Actor	Critics Best Actress
Dulquer Salman – Mahanati	Rashmika Mandanna – Geetha Govindam

=== Technical Awards ===
Best Cinematographer
- R. Rathnavelu (Telugu) – Rangasthalam
Best Choreography
- Prabhu Deva, Jani (Tamil) – "Rowdy Baby" from Maari 2

=== Special awards ===
Lifetime Achievement Award
- Hariharan
Best Female Debut
- Raiza Wilson (Tamil) for Pyaar Prema Kaadhal
- Saniya Iyappan (Malayalam) for Queen

== Superlatives ==
=== Multiple nominations ===
Nominations	Film
10	Rangasthalam
9	Tagaru
9	Geetha Govindam
8	Mahanati
7	96
7	Aravinda Sametha Veera Raghava
7	Koode
6	Nathicharami
6	C/o Kancharapalem
6	Chekka Chivantha Vaanam
5	Sammohanam
5	Sarkar
5	Kolamavu Kokila
5	Ee.Ma.Yau
5	Sarkari Hi. Pra. Shaale, Kasaragodu, Koduge: Ramanna Rai
4	KGF
4	Amma I Love You
4	Joseph
4	Captain
4	Theevandi
4	Pariyerum Perumal
3	Katheyondu Shuruvagide
3	Eeda
3	Raambo 2
3	Bharat Ane Nenu
3	Vada Chennai
3	Maari 2
3	Kanaa
3	Thaana Serndha Kootam
3	Ayogya
2	Ammachi Yemba Nenapu
2	Jeerjimbe
2	Oru Kuprasidha Payyan
2	Aami
2	Aravindante Athidhikal
2	Ratsasan
2	Pyaar Prema Kaadhal
2	2.0
2	Kaala
2	RX 100
2	Aatagadharaa Siva

=== Multiple wins ===
Wins	Film
5	Rangasthalam
5	96
4	Mahanati
4	Nathicharami
3	Sudani From Nigeria
2	Geetha Govindam
2	Joseph
2	Kanaa
2	Ee.Ma.Yau.
2	Pyaar Prema Kaadhal
2	Tagaru
2	Theevandi

== See also ==
- Filmfare Awards
