= Yamaleela =

- 100 days poster
- Directed by: S. V. Krishna Reddy
- Written by: Diwakar Babu (dialogues)
- Story by: S. V. Krishna Reddy
- Produced by: Kishore Rati; K. Atchi Reddy
- Starring: Ali; Indraja; Satyanarayana; Brahmanandam; Tanikella Bharani; Kota Srinivasa Rao
- Cinematography: Sarat; K. Rajendraprasad
- Music by: S. V. Krishna Reddy
- Distributed by: Manisha Films
- Release date: 28 April 1994
- Running time: 140 minutes
- Country: India
- Language: Telugu

Yamaleela (transl. 'Yama's divine play') is a 1994 Indian Telugu-language fantasy comedy film written, directed, and composed by S. V. Krishna Reddy. It stars comedian Ali in his debut as a lead actor, alongside Indraja, Satyanarayana, Manju Bhargavi, Bramhanandam, and Tanikella Bharani. The film was a major box office success.

The film was remade in Hindi as Taqdeerwala (1995) and in Tamil as Lucky Man (1995). A spiritual successor, Yamaleela 2, was released in 2014. Additionally, a sequel television series, Yamaleela Aa Taruvatha, aired from 2020 to 2022, continuing the events of the original film.

== Plot ==
Suraj, a mischievous young man, frequently disappoints his mother with his behaviour. He later discovers her past: his father was a zamindar and the owner of Swarna Palace, who died under the burden of debts, causing them to lose their estate. Determined to restore his mother’s happiness, Suraj vows to reclaim their palace at any cost. Meanwhile, he falls in love with Lilly, a petty thief and a greedy woman, but she rejects him. Thota Ramudu, a local rowdy with a grudge against Lilly, antagonizes Suraj, leading to his illness.

In the celestial realm, Yama, the god of death, and his aide Chitragupta misplace the Bhavishyavaani, a book that foretells the future. The book accidentally lands on the roof of Suraj's house. Using its predictions, Suraj quickly becomes wealthy, leaving Thota Ramudu astonished at his rapid success. Meanwhile, Lord Brahma warns Yama and Chitragupta that they must retrieve the book within a month or lose their supernatural powers. On earth, Suraj fulfills his vow by repurchasing Swarna Palace and taking his mother to live there. When she expresses a desire for him to marry, Suraj checks the book to see if Lilly would become his wife. Instead, he learns that his mother is destined to die at 10 PM that night.

To fulfill her last wish, Suraj stages a mock marriage with Lilly, but his mother miraculously survives. When Lilly exposes the ruse, Suraj's mother becomes angry and refuses to speak to him until he genuinely marries Lilly. Meanwhile, Yama and Chitragupta descend to earth in search of the book but face numerous challenges, as they are mistaken for drama artists by the public. Suraj eventually discovers their true identities and realises his mother’s survival is due to their inability to access the Bhavishyavaani. To protect his mother, Suraj traps Yama with the help of a woman named Latha. However, Yama uncovers the truth and learns that Suraj has the book.

Yama confronts Suraj and demands the book, but Suraj refuses to return it. Yama and Chitragupta make several unsuccessful attempts to retrieve it. When Thota Ramudu brutally attacks Suraj to uncover the secret behind his success, Yama intervenes and saves him. Suraj reveals that his actions are motivated by his devotion to his mother, earning Yama's respect. Yama visits Suraj's house without revealing his identity and inadvertently blesses Suraj's mother with a long life.

Meanwhile, Thota Ramudu conspires with Lilly to uncover Suraj’s secret. Lilly pretends to reciprocate Suraj’s love to extract the truth but is unsuccessful. When she forces him to choose between her and his mother, Suraj chooses his mother without hesitation, prompting Lilly to recognize his selflessness. In a final act of desperation, Thota Ramudu kidnaps Suraj’s mother and demands the book in exchange. Suraj surrenders the Bhavishyavaani to save her. Yama seizes the opportunity to destroy Thota Ramudu and retrieves the book. When Yama returns to claim Suraj's mother’s life, he discovers that she now possesses a long life due to his earlier blessing.

== Cast ==
- Ali as Suraj
- Indraja as Lilly
- Kaikala Satyanarayana as Yama
- Manju Bhargavi as Suraj's mother
- Bramhanandam as Chitragupta
- Tanikella Bharani as Thota Ramudu
- M. Balaiah as Brahma
- Kota Srinivasa Rao as Inspector Ranjith
- A. V. S.
- Gundu Hanumantha Rao as Gundu
- Saakshi Ranga Rao as Rangayya
- Subbaraya Sarma
- Chittibabu
- Jenny as Editor
- Krishna (Special Appearance in "Jumbare Joojumbare" Song)
- Baby Likhita
- Chakradhara Rao
- Dham
- Kishore Raati (cameo)
- Lathasri
- Master Milan
- Pooja

== Production ==
Director S. V. Krishna Reddy initially considered casting Mahesh Babu for the lead role in Yamaleela. During a flight from Hyderabad to Madras, he narrated the script to Mahesh Babu's father, actor Krishna. However, Krishna declined the offer, explaining that Mahesh Babu was still focused on his education. The role was later offered to Ali, who accepted and went on to play the lead.

Yamaleela was produced on a budget of ₹75 lakh and became a commercial success, reportedly doubling its investment at the box office. Ali, who made his debut as a lead actor with the film, received a remuneration of ₹50,000 for his performance.

== Music ==
Music for the film was composed by S. V. Krishna Reddy.

Track list
No.	Title	Lyrics	Singer(s)	Length
1.	"A...Ni Jeenu Pantu Choosi Bullemmoy"	Bhuvana Chandra	S. P. Balasubrahmanyam, K. S. Chithra	4:29
2.	"Sirulokinche Chinni"	Sirivennela Seetharama Sastry	S. P. Balasubrahmanyam, K. S. Chithra	4:56
3.	"Abhi Vandanam Yama Rajagrani"	Sirivennela Seetharama Sastry	S. P. Balasubrahmanyam, K. S. Chithra	4:33
4.	"Jumbare Joojumbare"	Jonnavittula Ramalingeswara Rao	S. P. Balasubrahmanyam, K. S. Chithra	4:30
5.	"Erra Kaluva Puvva"	Jonnavittula Ramalingeswara Rao	S. P. Balasubrahmanyam, K. S. Chithra	4:30
Total length:				23:01

== Sequels ==
A spiritual successor, Yamaleela 2, directed by the same filmmaker, was released in 2014. Additionally, a television series titled Yamaleela Aa Taruvatha aired on ETV from 2020 to 2022. Serving as a continuation of the events from the 1995 film, the series featured Ali and Manju Bhargavi reprising their roles as Suraj and his mother, respectively, while Suman portrayed the character of Yama.

== Awards ==
- Nandi Award for Best Choreographer – Suchitra
