= Badrinath (film) =

2011 Indian film by V. V. Vinayak

- Theatrical release poster
- Directed by: V. V. Vinayak
- Written by: Chinni Krishna
- Produced by: Allu Aravind
- Starring: Allu Arjun; Tamannaah Bhatia; Prakash Raj; Kelly Dorji
- Cinematography: Chota K. Naidu
- Edited by: Gautham Raju
- Music by: M. M. Keeravani
- Production company: Geetha Arts
- Distributed by: Geetha Arts
- Release date: 10 June 2011
- Running time: 140 minutes
- Country: India
- Language: Telugu
- Budget: ₹35–42 crore

Badrinath (alternatively spelled as Badrenath) is a 2011 Indian Telugu-language romantic action film directed by V. V. Vinayak and produced by Allu Aravind. It stars Allu Arjun as the titular samurai, along with Tamannaah Bhatia, Prakash Raj, and Kelly Dorji. The film centers on Badri, an Indian samurai trained by the religious Guru Bheeshma Narayan. As the protector of the Badrinath Temple, Badri strives to restore the faith of Alakananda, an atheist woman who falls for him. He clashes with her cruel uncle, Sarkar, while his Guru suspects him of breaking the rule against falling in love, jeopardizing his succession.

Badrinath was released on 10 June 2011 in 1,400 screens worldwide. While it received mixed to positive reviews from critics, it achieved moderate success at the box office. Prem Rakshith won the Filmfare Award for Best Choreography – South for the film's song "Nath Nath".

== Plot ==
Bheeshma Narayan is a religious guru and martial arts expert who selects Badri, a shepherd's son, and trains him to become an efficient samurai and the protector of Badrinath Temple. He soon meets Alakananda, an atheist woman whom he throws into the namesake river as a punishment for blowing a lamp at the temple, especially after he cured her ill grandfather. He rescues her after Bheeshma, convinced by her grandfather, orders him. Alakananda is ordered to light 1 lakh lamps as punishment, which Badri convinces her to do with devotion.

Alakananda's grandfather reveals that she became an atheist after watching her parents die in a temple fire. Alakananda grew up to become the object of hatred from her aunt, as she wants to get Alakananda forcibly married to her son Nani as a form of revenge. Badri takes up the challenge to revive her faith in God. She falls for him after he performs Pind Daan for her parents. Later, Bheeshma summons Badri to protect the Amarnath Temple, whose protector has been killed. After killing a group of terrorists with his sword, Badri is introduced publicly by Bheeshma. Alakananda, whose faith in God has also been revived, meets Badri's parents, who agree to their marriage but are caught in a dilemma when Bheeshma tells them that Badri must remain celibate to succeed him.

Alakananda is heartbroken, but Badri promises to unite her with her lover, not knowing it is him, by helping her offer a Brahma lotus, which they travel into the mountains to retrieve. Meanwhile, Alakananda's cruel uncle Sarkar learns about Badri from the Amarnath incident footage and sends Nani to retrieve Alakananda after Badri dies. The gang attacks Badri and Alakananda as they race against time to reach the temple, but Badri guards her and lets her enter the temple and make her wish. Alakananda demands Badri as her lover while Bheeshma demands him as his successor. While Badri is distracted, Nani throws a statue into the river, which Badri retrieves after jumping into it and killing the henchmen, but is stabbed by Nani upon reinstating the statue and is accused of being in love with Alakananda.

Bheeshma is shocked, and his suspicion grows further as he watches Alakananda being taken away and Badri gaining consciousness to call out her name. The temple is closed temporarily for six months, during which Badri recuperates and Alakananda is engaged to Nani after Sarkar kills her grandfather. Alakananda writes a letter to Badri for help, which Bheeshma receives and tears apart. However, Badri finds the letter and replies with the same mountain soil he used to cure her grandfather. Sarkar and his family learn from a guru that the wedding is not destined to happen. Alakananda tries to escape with her friend Razia but is captured, and only Razia escapes, convincing Badri to secretly go to Bellary and rescue Alakananda.

In Badri's and Bheeshma's absence, Sarkar leads his henchmen to Badrinath and destroys the ashram, while Badri himself massacres the henchmen at Bellary railway station and impales Nani before rescuing Alakananda. Seeing the ashram in ruins and realizing Badri took along his sword meant only for religious protection, an enraged Bheeshma orders Badri to leave Badrinath after the latter arrives with Alakananda. Alakananda thanks God for freeing Badri from Bheeshma's clutches. However, Sarkar, his wife, and his henchmen arrive at Badrinath to kidnap her. Badri hands her over and reveals he only wanted to keep his promise and never had feelings for her, but dedicated his life to his mentor instead.

Bheeshma asks Badri to apologize and lets him pray before Alakananda reveals she loves none other than Badri, who remains unfazed as they take her away. However, Bheeshma is moved by Alakananda's love for Badri and orders him to live for her. Badri kills the henchmen and defeats Sarkar after a knife duel, sparing him on the condition that he never pursue Alakananda in the future. Everyone at the temple blesses Bhadri and Alakananda, and Bheeshma asks the couple to hand over their future child for training.

== Cast ==
- Allu Arjun as Bhadri
- Tamannaah Bhatia as Alakananda, Bhadri's love interest
- Prakash Raj as Guru Bheeshma Narayana, Bhadri's guru
- Kelly Dorji as Sarkar, Alakananda's uncle
- Ashwini Kalsekar as Alakananda's aunt and Sarkar's wife
- Rakesh Varre as Nani, Sarkar's son
- Brahmanandam as Batting Baba
- Pragathi as Razia, Alakananda's maid
- Tanikella Bharani as Bhadri's father
- Kovai Sarala as Bhadri's mother
- K. Viswanath as Alakananda's grandfather
- Sayaji Shinde as Alakananda's father (cameo appearance)
- Sudha as Alakananda's mother (cameo appearance)
- M. S. Narayana as Chupke
- Rao Ramesh as Bheeshma Narayana's assistant
- Raghu Babu as Alakananda's caretaker
- Master Bharath
- Geetha Singh
- Dharmavarapu Subramanyam
- Krishna Bhagavaan
- Venu Madhav

== Production ==
The film was in the scripting stage in 2004 with Chinni Krishna set to direct the film. Allu Arjun played a modern-day Indian samurai in the film, for which he underwent intensive martial arts and sword fighting training in Vietnam. Cinematographer Ravi Varman revealed that the film was shot using a Panavision lens at a set in Kulaba on the way to the Rohtang Pass, as well as at locations in Hyderabad, Spain, Italy, Germany, and Austria, including the Badrinath temple set. Initially, there were plans for a dubbed Tamil version of the film featuring additional comedy scenes with actor Santhanam. However, this plan was abandoned due to the commercial failure of the Tamil dubbed versions of the Telugu films Sakthi and Magadheera.

== Music ==
Badrinath

Soundtrack album by M. M. Keeravani
- Released: 7 May 2011
- Recorded: 2011
- Genre: Feature film soundtrack
- Length: 35:49
- Label: Aditya Music
- Producer: M. M. Keeravani

M. M. Keeravani chronology
Once Upon a Warrior (2011)	Badrinath (2011)	Rajanna (2011)

The grand audio launching event of Badrinath was held at Shilpakala Vedika on 7 May 2011. Allu Arjun, Sneha Reddy, Tamannaah Bhatia, V. V. Vinayak, Allu Aravind, his wife Nirmala, M. M. Keeravani, K. Raghavendra Rao, A. Kodandarami Reddy, K. S. Rama Rao, Chiranjeevi, his wife Mrs. Surekha, Srija, Sukumar, S. S. Rajamouli, Rama Rajamouli, Boyapati Srinu, B. V. S. N. Prasad, B. Gopal, Srinu Vaitla, Anand Sai, S. Gopal Reddy, Tagore Madhu, K. Atchi Reddy, Chandrabose, Chinni Krishna, Chaitanya Prasad, Pokuri Babu Rao, etc., were prominent figures in the audio function.

K. Raghavendra Rao and Chiranjeevi released the audio CDs and presented the first copy to S. S. Rajamouli and V. V. Vinayak. Allu Aravind released the trailers.

Track listing
No.	Title	Lyrics	Singer(s)	Length
1.	"Omkareshwari"	Veturi	Shankar Mahadevan, M. M. Keeravani	4:58
2.	"Ambadari"	Chandrabose	L. V. Revanth, Sravana Bhargavi	4:05
3.	"In the Night"	Sravana Bhargavi	Baba Sehgal, Sravana Bhargavi	2:58
4.	"Nachchavura"	M. M. Keeravani, Anantha Sriram	Sreerama Chandra, Chaitra H. G.	3:57
5.	"Nath Nath"	Chandrabose	Jassie Gift, Sunidhi Chauhan	4:09
6.	"Chiranjeeva"	Chandrabose	L. V. Revanth, Shreya Ghoshal	4:39
7.	"Ambadari (Remix)"	Chandrabose, Achu	Anuj Gurwara, Geetha Madhuri, Kala Bhairava	3:45
8.	"Vasudhara"	Chandrabose, S. Ballesh (Shehnai)	M. M. Keeravani, Shweta Pandit	5:00
9.	"Badrinath Theme"	Chaitanya Prasad	Twin Cities Choir (Programmed by Dinesh)	2:14
Total length:				35:49

A reviewer from 123Telugu gave the soundtrack a positive review, praising Keeravani's attempt to create something different from Magadheera and describing the album as "unique, simple and entertaining".

== Release ==
Certified A (adults only) by the Central Board of Film Certification on the account of graphic action violence, the film released theatrically along with its Malayalam dubbed version with same name on 10 June 2011.

=== Home Video ===
Aditya Music released the film on DVD and Blu-ray formats.

== Reception ==
=== Box office ===
On its release day, Badrinath grossed ₹7.25 crore, and by the third day, it had grossed ₹16.5 crore. By the end of is theatrical run, Badrinath had minted a total distributor's share of ₹30 crore and a gross of over ₹51 crore, emerging as one of the highest Telugu grossers of the year. The film's successful 50-day run in 187 theaters also indicated a moderate level of success at the box office, despite the negative reviews and its overall budget.

=== Critical response ===
Badrinath received mixed to negative reviews from critics. Noting it as a love story from a girl's point of view, Idlebrain.com gave the film 3 stars out of 5, praising Arjun, the music, cinematography, locations, art direction and production values. However, he felt the director failed to get a good script, action and emotional aspects right, further noting the film's unfolding and narration were "not gripping". 123Telugu.com gave the film 2.5 stars out of 5, singling several sequences between Badri and Alakananda, performances, visuals, a comedy track and some of the action sequences for praise. However, the reviewer felt disappointed with the story, screenplay, entire second half, criticizing the villain, a comedy scene involving conversation about Rajinikanth and Chiranjeevi, the random placement of songs and the climax. The reviewer also felt the railway station fight should have been banned due to excessively graphic violence.

The Times of India gave the film 2 stars out of 5, calling it a "disappointing ride". The reviewer found the love story against the temple backdrop unconvincing, action scenes, Tammannah's unnecessary belly show, music average and went on to state there was "not even a single interesting scene in the film". The reviewer, however, praised the art director Anand Sai for his work on recreating the Badrinath temple and other sets. Rediff.com responded more negatively with a 1.5/5 star rating, calling the plot unoriginal and feeling the romance was overshadowed by the action, cinematography and other aspects. More criticism was aimed at the script, randomly inserted songs and humor, while praise came towards the action sequences, technical aspects, art direction, production values and performances.

== Accolades ==
=== 59th Filmfare Awards South ===
- Filmfare Award for Best Choreography – South – Prem Rakshith – "Nath Nath"
- Nandi Award for Best Audiographer – K. Devi Krishna

=== TSR-TV9 Awards-2011 ===
- Best Hero – Allu Arjun

=== CineMAA Awards ===
- Nominated – Best Actor – Allu Arjun
