= Racha (film) =

2012 Indian film by Sampath Nandi

- Film poster
- Directed by: Sampath Nandi
- Written by: Sampath Nandi; Paruchuri brothers
- Produced by: R. B. Choudary; N. V. Prasad; Paras Jain
- Starring: Ram Charan; Tamannaah Bhatia; Ajmal Ameer; Mukesh Rishi
- Cinematography: Sameer Reddy
- Edited by: Gautham Raju
- Music by: Mani Sharma
- Production company: Megaa Super Good Films
- Release date: 5 April 2012
- Running time: 144 minutes
- Country: India
- Language: Telugu

Racha (transl. Chaos/Uproar) is a 2012 Indian Telugu-language action comedy film directed by Sampath Nandi and produced by Megaa Super Good Films. The film stars Ram Charan and Tamannaah Bhatia, alongside Ajmal Ameer, Mukesh Rishi, Dev Gill, Kota Srinivasa Rao, Nassar and Brahmanandam with R. Parthiban appearing in a cameo. The film marks the Telugu debuts of Tamil actors Ajmal Ameer and R. Parthiban. The music was composed by Mani Sharma, while cinematography and editing were handled by Sameer Reddy and Gautham Raju respectively.

Principal photography commenced in June 2011 and was shot in various locations, mainly in Telangana, Andhra Pradesh and Tamil Nadu, apart from Sri Lanka and Bangkok. It was also shot in Anji County of China, which is the first in Telugu cinema.

Racha was released worldwide on 5 April 2012 to positive reviews from critics. The film emerged as a commercial success grossing over ₹81 crore at the box office with a distributor's share of ₹45 crore. The film received four nominations at the 60th Filmfare Awards South, where it won the award for best choreography. It also received five nominations at 2nd South Indian International Movie Awards.

== Plot ==
Raj, a successful gambler, lives in Hyderabad with his adoptive parents, who support his means of living. Tragedy strikes the family when his adopted father is diagnosed with liver cirrhosis due to alcoholism. Raj needs ₹20 lakh for his father's liver transplantation, which must be done within a month. While on a lookout for money, Raj is approached by his rival James, with a betting challenge. James gives a task to Raj to make Chaitra, a medicine student and the daughter of Bellary, a dreaded crime boss, fall in love with him before New Year's Eve, in exchange for providing money for his father's operation.

Desperate for the money, Raj takes up the challenge and begins wooing Chaitra, who reciprocates his advances. Bellary learns about their relationship and sends his henchmen to kill the couple on the night of New Year's Eve. Raj and Chaitra dodge the henchmen and escape to Srisailam. Bellary, with the help of his corrupt minister-friend Baireddanna and Baireddanna's Dubai-based son, begins a search for them. At Srisailam, James rescues the couple from Bellary's henchmen, but gets stabbed by Baireddanna's son, who also kidnaps Chaitra. An injured James reveals that he was sent by his father to protect them and reveals about Raj's past.

Past: Raj's father Suryanarayana is a respected landlord in Rayadurga, and his best friend Raghupathy is a business tycoon and Chaitra's biological father. Chaitra and Raj were childhood friends. Bellary, Raghupathy's brother-in-law, finds about the presence of iron ore under Raghupathy's land. Bellary, along with Baireddanna, decides to exploit the ore for their benefits. When Suryanarayana and Raghupathy objects, they and their families, except Raj and Chaitra, are killed by Bellary and Baireddanna. Chaitra is adopted by Bellary, who planned to kill her when she becomes an adult so that he could acquire Raghupathy's land.

Present: James reveals that his father, who is Bellary's PA, had revealed the past to Chaitra, who decided to avenge her father's death. Chaitra had learnt about Raj and his love for making bets from James, where she and James's father told him to trap Raj by placing the bet so that Bellary and Baireddanna can be destroyed using him. Learning this, Raj decides to avenge his father's death and kills Bellary, Baireddanna and his son at Rayadurga. Raj rescues Chaitra, who was badly injured by Bellary, and they distribute Raghupathy and Suryanarayana's land to the villagers.

== Cast ==
- Ram Charan as Raj "Cherry"
- Tamannaah Bhatia as Chaitra "Ammu"
- Ajmal Ameer as James
- Mukesh Rishi as Bellary, Chaitra's uncle
- Dev Gill as Naga Reddy, Baireddy's son
- Kota Srinivasa Rao as Baireddy
- Nassar as Raghupathi, Chaitra's father
- Brahmanandam as Dr Rangeela
- Ali as Papa Rao
- Diksha Panth as Basanthi, Papa Rao's girlfriend
- Paruchuri Venkateswara Rao as Venkatachalam, James's father
- Giri Babu as Rama Chandra Murthy, Raj's friend
- Jaya Prakash Reddy as SI J. P. D. Souza
- Geetha as Janaki, Bellary's wife
- Venu Madhav as Venu Raj's friend
- Srinivasa Reddy as Raj's friend
- Thagubothu Ramesh as Bobby, Raj's friend
- M. S. Narayana as Raj's adoptive father
- Sudha as Raj's adoptive mother
- Ravi Babu as Chaitra's bodyguard
- Mukhtar Khan as police officer
- Dharmavarapu Subramanyam as Subramanyam, Raj's uncle
- Krishna Bhagavaan as KP
- Fish Venkat as Venkat
- Jhansi as Slum Member
- Chatrapathi Sekhar as villager
- Duvvasi Mohan as waiter
- Uttej
- L. B. Sriram as villager
- Shriya Sharma as Chaitra's sister
- Geetha Singh as KP's sister
- Hema as Raj's aunt
- Satya Krishnan as a slum member
- Vennela Kishore as Raj's friend
- Junior Relangi as a religious man

Cameo appearances

- R. Parthiban as Suryanarayana, Raj's late biological father
- Pragathi as Raj's late biological mother
- Lisa Haydon in the title song

== Production ==
=== Development ===
R. B. Choudary, in association with N. V. Prasad and Paras Jain, produced a film titled Merupu directed by Dharani, starring Ram Charan and Kajal Aggarwal whose production began on 30 April 2010. There was no proper script except a vague one-line for the film and a song was shot with Charan. After the release of Orange (2010), Charan and the producers asked Dharani to come up with a complete script. Dharani narrated it to Charan and his father Chiranjeevi. When Dharani quoted a high budget, Chiranjeevi and the producers suggested a reduction.

After completing a schedule, Merupu was shelved and later, N. V. Prasad approved a script narrated by Sampath Nandi and announced in late February 2011. The film's official launch ceremony was conducted on 12 June 2011 at Ramanaidu Studios in Hyderabad where the film's working title was announced as Racha. Mani Sharma was signed to compose the film's music. Sameer Reddy was recruited as the film's cinematographer while Raju Sundaram and Shobi choreographed the songs along with Prem Rakshith. The film's Telugu logo was unveiled on 14 February 2012 and the title was confirmed as Racha, where the first two letters were taken from Ram and the other three letters were taken from Charan. The first look poster featuring Charan was unveiled on 18 February 2012.

=== Casting ===
Charan left for an international trip for a complete make-over of his attire and practised different dancing steps as part of his homework for the film. He also underwent training in strict physical exercise for about 45 days at David Barton's gym. Reports in early March 2011 suggested that Tamannaah Bhatia would be signed in as the female lead, who was finalised for the same in mid May 2011. She was confirmed to play the role of a rich who falls in love with a poor man. She later revealed in an interview that her character is integral to the film's main plot and its layers get revealed as the film progresses.

R. Parthiban made a cameo appearance as Charan's father in the film, marking his Telugu debut who accepted it after Nandi explained the role's importance. Ajmal Ameer's inclusion in the film's cast was confirmed in late July 2011. He revealed later that every character in the film would be introduced through his character which would be a cameo, adding that it would be an impactful one bringing twists in the story. He could not dub for his role as he was shooting for a Tamil film in France. Brahmanandam and Krishna Bhagavaan were included in the film's cast in early October 2011. Dev Gill was signed to play one of the antagonists. He revealed that all his action sequences will be with Ram Charan only. Lisa Haydon performed an item number in the film.

=== Filming ===
Principal photography commenced in June 2011 at Hyderabad. The next schedule began at Sri Lanka in early July 2011. Tamannaah joined the film's sets on 7 July 2011 and she revealed that the film would be shot in the jungles of Sri Lanka in a long schedule. A song featuring Charan and Tamannaah was shot in Sri Lanka in late July 2011 after which the schedule was wrapped up. Filming continued at Bangkok till 15 August 2011. A dance academy set was erected in the outskirts of Hyderabad where a few comedy scenes were shot.

Some scenes were shot in a set erected near the Aluminium Factory at Gachibowli. Tamannaah and Brahmanandam participated in the film's shoot at Hyderabad till 6 October 2011 after which the makers planned to shoot the film in China. After much shooting in Hyderabad, filming continued at Goa. During the shoot of Charan's introduction scene, the cables fixed to the train failed and Charan, who was sitting in a car on the railway track, jumped from the car and was injured. After the schedule's completion, Charan visited Sabarimala Temple to end his Aiyyappa Deeksha.

The song "Vaana Vaana Velluvaye" was shot with Charan and Tamannaah in early November 2011. A special set in Annapurna Studios was erected where the song was shot for four days after which the film's China schedule commenced from 12 November 2011. A song and a fight sequence was shot at a Bamboo forest in Anji County of Zhejiang province till the end of November 2011. Racha became the first Telugu film to be shot in the dense forest of interior China. On its completion, Charan took a break for ten days. The film's shoot resumed at Rayalacheruvu near Tirupati in December 2011. After a brief shoot at Ramoji Film City, the last schedule began in Chennai on 17 January 2012. The shooting of the title song choreographed by Prem Rakshith was wrapped up at Buddha Statue of Hyderabad on 23 January 2012.

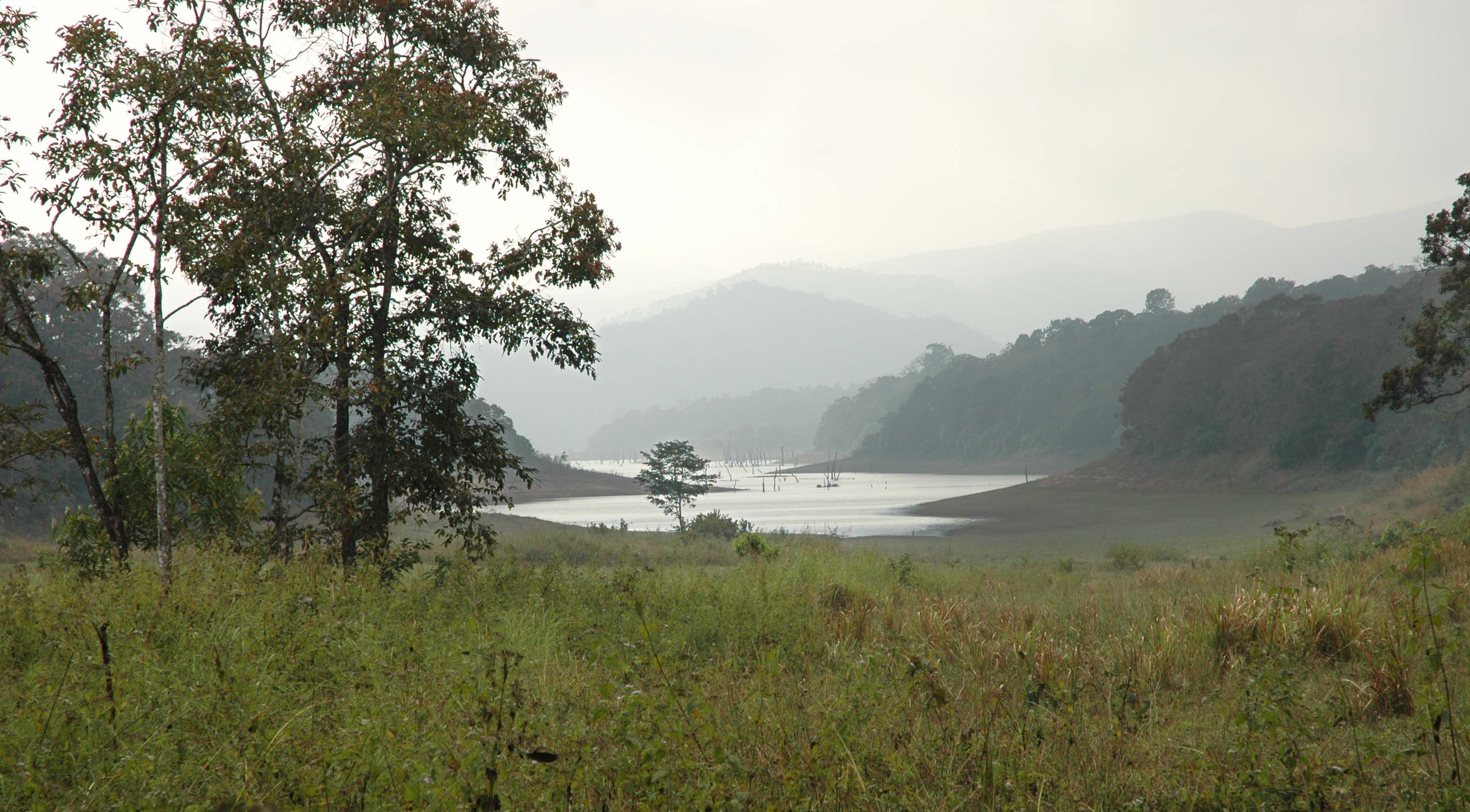
Periyar National Park in Kerala, where the film's shoot was initially disrupted and later resumed

The film's shoot continued at Periyar National Park of Kerala in February 2012. Charan and Tamannaah were filming for a song sequence on a boat when the park's deputy director Sanjay Kumar insisted that the duo should use life jackets as they were entering a risky spot. After few disagreements, the film's shoot was temporarily halted and some long shots were shot when the duo used the jackets. The forest officials also restricted the entry of about 20 vehicles and 100 members into the park due to which the shoot was limited to a small portion of a song.

After spraining his leg during the song shoot at Annapurna Studios, Charan was advised to take a bed rest for three to four weeks. He rejoined the shoot on 25 March 2012 to complete the remaining two songs. After completing the shoot for the song "Dillaku Dillaku" at Annapurna Studios in Hyderabad, the last song "Singarenundi" was shot at Anaimalai Hills and Siruvani Waterfalls near Pollachi on Charan and Tamannaah. On its completion, the film's team returned to Hyderabad and the principal photography came to an end on 1 April 2012.

== Music ==
Mani Sharma composed the film's soundtrack and background score. The soundtrack consists of 5 songs. The song "Vaana Vaana Velluvaye" from the film Gang Leader was remixed for this film. Aditya Music and Star Music marketed the soundtrack albums of the Telugu and Tamil versions respectively. The soundtrack was released by hosting a promotional event at People's Plaza near Necklace Road on 20 February 2012.

== Release ==
The film was initially scheduled for a release in March 2012. After Charan suffered a muscle tear in his leg, the film's shoot was delayed due to which the film's release was postponed to 5 April 2012. The film's Tamil dubbed version titled Ragalai was announced in mid March 2012 after the release of Maaveeran. Racha was awarded an 'U/A' certificate by Central Board of Film Certification on 3 April 2012.

After Competition Commission of India imposed a fine on Karnataka Film Chamber of Commerce for restricting free trade, Racha released in Karnataka in more than 120 screens. Ragalai was released on 6 April 2012. The Malayalam dubbed version Raksha released on 13 April 2012 though it was planned for a simultaneous release with Ragalai. Racha's satellite rights were sold to Gemini TV. The Indian and overseas DVDs and Blu-rays of the Telugu version were marketed by Aditya Videos.

Racha was dubbed into Tamil as Ragalai and into Malayalam as Raksha. The former was released on 6 April 2012 while the latter was released a week later. The film was dubbed into Hindi as Betting Raja and it was remade in Bangladesh as Honeymoon starring Bappy Chowdhury and Mahiya Mahi.

== Reception ==
=== Box office ===
Racha debuted with an average occupancy of 90% and collected ₹8.54 crore (US$910,000) at the AP/Nizam box office setting first day record. The film collected a total of ₹15 crore (US$1.6 million) by the end of its first weekend and by then, Ragalai had a successful theatrical run. In its first week, the film collected ₹24.42 crore (US$2.6 million) at AP/Nizam box office out of which ₹7.5 crore (US$800,000) was from Nizam region. The film collected ₹2.5 crore (US$270,000) in Karnataka, taking its first week Indian box office total to ₹26.92 crore (US$2.9 million). By late April 2012, the film collected ₹15 crore (US$1.6 million) nett in Karnataka.

In four weeks, Racha grossed ₹53.48 crore (US$5.7 million) at the global box office including the collections of the dubbed versions with a distributor share of ₹37.48 crore (US$4.0 million) at the AP/Nizam box office. The film completed a 50-day run in 127 direct centres across the AP/Nizam region out of which 38 screens were from Ceded region and 16 screens were from Nizam region. By then, the film was declared a blockbuster. The film completed a 100-day run in 38 centres across Andhra Pradesh on 13 July 2012. Racha's final share for its distributors was ₹45 crore (US$4.8 million).

=== Critical response ===
Sify called the film a "paisa vasool" one and stated "Both, actor Ram Charan and his director Sampath Nandi play a safe game by following the same pattern of earlier mass-masala movies. Rachcha offers nothing new but has enough elements that entertain the mass audiences and mega fans." Sangeetha Devi Dundoo of The Hindu stated "Within the framework of pleasing the actor's fan clubs, the film works. But the sense of déjà vu in the tale of revenge is palpable. Even when you tune yourself into watching a mass entertainer and don't expect anything intellectually stimulating, you do miss the ingenuity and spark that were the hallmark of mass entertainer blockbusters like Singam, Pokiri or Kick. Go without expectations and you will be entertained."

Karthik Pasupulate of The Times of India gave the film 3 out of 5 stars and felt that the film is designed for the "hardcore Mega Fans and it makes no bones about it". He added "Clearly there are a lot of prospective hooting opportunities for the die hard Ram Charan fans. As for the other kind of audience, well, you'll have to ask them. We suspect they might just be feeling a little unattended". Praising the screenplay written by Sampath Nandi, Ramchander of Oneindia Entertainment stated "Finally, Sampath Nandi has come out with a good film. Though, the story is not that great and is quite predictable one, the ability of the director made it quite interesting."

Rating the film 2.5 out of 5 stars, CNN-IBN felt that the film was technically brilliant but lacked a credible storyline. They termed the film's presentation as a "lacklustre and ordinary" one. Radhika Rajamani of Rediff.com gave 2 out of 5 stars and criticised the film for its predictability and stereotypical pattern and stated that Racha is a potboiler meant for the masses and not for a discerning audience.

== Accolades ==
Ceremony	Category	Nominee	Result	Reference(s)
60th Filmfare Awards South	Best Film	R. B. Choudary	Nominated	
60th Filmfare Awards South	Best Actor	Ram Charan	Nominated	
60th Filmfare Awards South	Best Actress	Tamannaah Bhatia	Nominated	
60th Filmfare Awards South	Best Choreography	Jani Master for "Dillaku Dillaku"	Won	
2nd South Indian International Movie Awards	Best Actor	Ram Charan	Nominated	
2nd South Indian International Movie Awards	Best Actress	Tamannaah Bhatia	Nominated	
2nd South Indian International Movie Awards	Best Music Director	Mani Sharma	Nominated	
2nd South Indian International Movie Awards	Best Male Playback Singer	Hemachandra for "Oka Paadam"	Nominated	
2nd South Indian International Movie Awards	Best Dance Choreographer	Shobi for "Vaana Vaana"	Nominated	

== In popular culture ==
The specially designed axe used by Ram Charan in the film's climax was auctioned by Movie Artist Association. In a press meet, Tammanaah showcased the axe to the media and the proceeds of its sale were announced to be used to educate poor children in Telugu cinema. In Aagadu (2014), Brahmanandam performed a spoof on this film along with two other 2014 Telugu films Legend and Race Gurram.
