= Nandi Award for Best Choreographer =

Indian film award

This is a list of recipients of Nandi Award for Best Choreographer since 1985, the year when the award for this category was instituted.

Year	Choreographer	Film
2016	Raju Sundaram	Janatha Garage
2015	Prem Rakshith	Baahubali: The Beginning
2014	Prem Rakshith	Aagadu
2013	Sekhar	Gunde Jaari Gallanthayyinde
2012	Jani Master	Julai
2011	Sreenu	Sri Rama Rajyam
2010	Prem Rakshith	Adhurs
2009	Shiva Shankar	Magadheera
2008	Prem Rakshith	Kantri
2007	Nobel	Deshamuduru (Satte E godava ledhu..)
2006	Raghava Lawrence	Style
2005	Srinivas	Radha Gopalam
2004	Prabhu Deva	Varsham
2003	Raju Sundaram	Okkadu
2002	Raghava Lawrence	Indra
2001	Suchitra	Nuvvu Naaku Nachav
2000	Taara	Chala Bagundi
1999	Raghava Lawrence	Annayya
1998	Saroj Khan	Choodalani Vundi
1997	Taara	Arundhati
1996	Tharun	Thaali
1995	K.Raghavendra Rao	Pelli Sandadi
1994	Suchitra	Yamaleela
1993	Prabhu Deva	Rakshana
1992	Bhooshan	Aapadbandhavudu
1991	P. Krishna murthy	Manjeera Naadham
1990	Sundaram	Jagadeka Veerudu Athiloka Sundari
1989	Sundaram	Geethanjali
1988	Srinivas	Swarnakamalam
1987	K. V. Satyanarayana	Sruthilayalu
1986	Aanand	Alapana
1985	Seshu	Mayuri
