= Igguthappa =

Igguthappa is a Kodava deity worshipped in Kodagu, India.

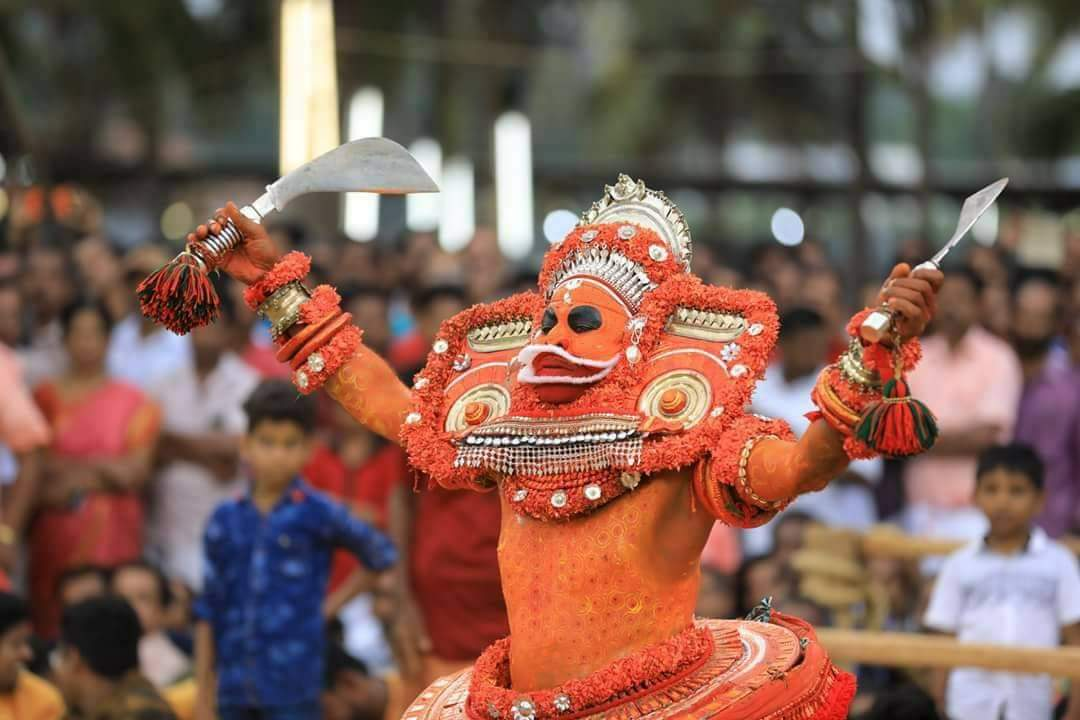
Bainattappa Last brother of Igguthappa Who moved to Wayanad, Kerala.

== Mythology ==
The Kodava God of the Kodava Tribe, Legend has it that in ancient times from what is now Kerala arrived seven celestial children. They were siblings, six brothers (including Igguthappa) and one sister. The first 3 brothers stayed back in Kerala in and around what is known as Kanjirath village, in Taliparamba. The eldest brother was known as Kanyaratappa (Kanyarat was a name for Kanjirath), the second was Thiruchembarappa and the third was Bendru kolappa, known by the names of the villages they settled down in and where temples were built for them. The temples built for the three brothers are now famous in Kannur in Kerala.

- The temple of the first brother is now famous as the Rajarajeshwara Temple in Tali Paramba.
- The Trichambaram Temple of the second brother is now famous as the Krishna temple in Taliparamba.
- The third temple is well known as the Vidyanatha temple of Kanjirangad.

The remaining three brothers with their sister moved towards Kodagu.

- The fourth brother Igguthappa took base at Malma in Kodagu and a temple was built for him at Paadi naad.
- The fifth brother moved to Paloor in Kodagu where a temple was built for him. It became known as the Mahalingeshwara temple.
- Their sister who was called Thangamma settled down in Ponnangala village, near Kakkabe, where a shrine was built for her and so is now known also as Ponnangala Thamme.
- The last brother Pemmayya moved further south and moved into what is now as Waynad in Kerala. Now known as Bainattappa or Wayanattu kulavan .
