= Rowdy Baby =

2018 single from Maari 2 by Yuvan Shankar Raja

- Song cover

Single by Yuvan Shankar Raja (composer) and Dhanush, Dhee (performer)

from the album Maari 2
- Language: Tamil
- Released: 28 November 2018
- Genre: Filmi; dance-pop; electronic
- Length: 4:44 min
- Label: Wunderbar Studios; Divo
- Composer: Yuvan Shankar Raja
- Lyricist: Dhanush
- Producer: Dhanush

Music video
- "Rowdy Baby" on YouTube

"Rowdy Baby" is a Tamil language song composed by Yuvan Shankar Raja for the soundtrack of the 2018 action comedy film Maari 2. Starring Dhanush and Sai Pallavi, and sung by Dhanush alongside Dhee. The song was officially released on 28 November 2018 as a single from the film.

Upon release, the song went viral and became very popular, and its music video, released in January 2019, featuring the film's lead pair Dhanush and Sai Pallavi, broke several YouTube records, becoming one of the most viewed Indian songs of all-time. Billboard listed the song in the Global Top 10 Music Videos of 2019. According to YouTube Top Trending Music Videos, Rowdy Baby was the most streamed Indian video of 2019 and the seventh most globally. As of September 2025, the views on YouTube crossed 1.8+ billion views (combining both video and lyrical), making it the only South Indian (and Tamil) cinema song on YouTube to achieve this feat. Also it's Telugu version has over 80 million views (both video and lyrical). This is one of the most-viewed Indian videos on YouTube.

== Music video ==
The video see the film's lead pair, Dhanush and Sai Pallavi dancing to the tune in a set at the AVM studios in Chennai. Prabhu Deva was assigned to choreograph the song along with Jani Master. Sai Pallavi, who had participated in a dance reality TV show called Ungalil Yaar Adutha Prabhudeva (transl. Who of you is going to be the next Prabhudeva?) 10 years before and was eliminated in the semi-finals, failing to meet him, later recalled that through this song, she was eventually able to meet and work with Prabhu Deva, sharing a picture taken on the sets, which coincidentally was the same sets where the show had been shot before. The video was uploaded on 12 January 2019 on YouTube, and had achieved lot of views due to its choreography and picturisation.

== Reception ==
=== Critical response ===
"Rowdy Baby" was listed as one of the year's best Tamil songs by musicaloud.com, and in the Top 10 Tamil songs of November on Film Companion by Karthik Srinivasan, who called it a "fantastic song, with a swinging African-style guitar and funky singing by Dhanush and Dhee". Aarthi Murali of Silverscreen stated the song to be "cheeky, stupid, and of the best kind".

=== Performance and records ===
The music video became a viral phenomenon upon release, breaking several YouTube records. Besides being the second fastest South Indian as well as Tamil language video to reach 100 million views in 17 days (Arabic Kuthu being the first in 12 days), it was also the first to cross 200 million views. On 8 February 2019, it crossed 179 million views, beating Dhanush's previous viral hit "Why This Kolaveri Di" to become the most viewed Tamil song, before beating " In August 2019, it was said to be the "first Tamil song to cross 500 million views". On 16 November 2020, it crossed 1 billion views to become the first Tamil film song to achieve this feat.

It was one of the two most streamed songs on JioSaavn.

== Awards and nominations ==
Ceremony	Year	Category	Recipients	Result
Filmfare Awards South	2019	Best Choreography	Prabhu Deva & Jani Master	Won
Filmfare Awards South	2019	Best Male Playback Singer – Tamil	Dhanush	Nominated
Filmfare Awards South	2019	Best Female Playback Singer – Tamil	Dhee	Nominated
South Indian International Movie Awards	2019	Best Female Playback Singer	Dhee	Won
Zee Cine Awards Tamil	2020	Best Choreographer	Prabhu Deva	Won
Behindwoods Gold Medals	2022	Best Song of the Decade	Yuvan Shankar Raja	Won
