= Jani Master =

Indian choreographer

- Born: Shaik Jani Basha; 2 July 1982 (age 44); Nellore, Andhra Pradesh, India
- Occupation: Choreographer
- Years active: 1992–present
- Political party: Jana Sena Party (2024)
- Spouse: Suma Latha also known as Ayesha
- Children: 2

Shaik Jani Basha (born 2 July 1982), known professionally as Jani Master, is an Indian dance choreographer who predominantly works in Telugu, Tamil, Kannada and Hindi films. He choreographs in various dance styles, with a focus on Western and folk styles. He received a National Film Award, three Filmfare Awards South and three SIIMA Awards.

== Early life ==
Shaik Jani Basha was born on 2 July 1982 in Nellore, Andhra Pradesh.

== Career ==
Jani began his film career as a dancer in Telugu films and on ETV's Telugu dance reality show Dhee. He was later given the opportunity to choreograph for 2009 Telugu film Drona. Actor Ram Charan hired him as the choreographer for 2012 Telugu film Racha and continued to employ him for choreography in all his subsequent films. Jani has also worked as a choreographer for other actors such as Pawan Kalyan, Allu Arjun, N. T. Rama Rao Jr., Ram Pothineni and Ravi Teja. He has also sung a song dedicated to Ram Charan.

In 2014, Hindi actor Salman Khan appointed Jani as the choreographer for Jai Ho. He also choreographs award ceremonies and continues to work on feature films. He has been a choreographer and mentor on two television reality dance shows. His awards include Filmfare Awards, CineMAA Awards and South Indian International Movie Awards. Since 2017, he has served as a judge on Telugu television reality dance shows, including Neethone Dance on the Star Maa.

In 2018, Jani choreographed the film MLA. In the same year, he also assisted Prabhudeva on the Tamil song "Rowdy Baby" from the Maari 2. The song became a viral hit for its choreography across the Indian subcontinent and beyond. In 2020, he received acclaim for his choreography of "Butta Bomma" from the Telugu film Ala Vaikunthapurramuloo. The rolling step in the music video became widely popular and was recreated by many celebrities and social media users. This song also became a hit. He has officially joined the Jana Sena Party in January 2024, but was later suspended from the party due to sexual harassment allegations against him.

== Personal life ==
Jani married Ayesha, a classical dancer, and they have a son and a daughter.

== Alleged sexual assault and harassment ==
A POCSO complaint was registered at the Raidurgam Police Station, Hyderabad, in September 2024, against Jani for alleged sexual assault and harassment by an employee. The complaint was given in a sealed cover due to the complainant being a minor (under the age of 18) at the time of the alleged crime. He was arrested and taken into custody by Telangana Police in Goa, India on 19 September 2024. On 24 October 2024, Telangana High Court granted him bail.

== Filmography ==
Year	Title	Song(s)	Language	Ref.
2009	Drona	"Yem Maa Chesavo", "Voddantana Voddantana", "Vennela Vaana"	Telugu	
2009	Rechipo	"Tholi Tholiga", "Yethuko Nannethuko"	Telugu	
2009	Agyaat	"Kiss You Day And Night"	Hindi	
2010	Maryada Ramanna	"Raaye Raaye"	Telugu	
2010	Ranga The Donga		Telugu	
2010	Prasthanam		Telugu	
2011	Katha Screenplay Darsakatvam Appalaraju		Telugu	
2011	Garam		Telugu	
2011	Dongala Mutha		Telugu	
2011	Nenu Naa Rakshasi		Telugu	
2011	Prema Kavali		Telugu	
2011	Eega		Telugu	
2012	Racha	"Dillaku Dillaku"	Telugu	
2012	Poola Rangadu	"Chocolate Kannula"	Telugu	
2012	Julayi	"Mee Intiki Mundhu"	Telugu	
2013	Naayak	"Laila O Laila", "Shubalekha Rasukunna"	Telugu	
2013	Baadshah	"Rangoli Rangoli"	Telugu	
2013	Iddarammayilatho	"Ganapathi Bappa "	Telugu	
2013	Sukumarudu	"Tongi Tongi"	Telugu	
2013	Adda	"Hey Mister"	Telugu	
2013	Masala	"Ninu Choodani"	Telugu	
2013	Oke Oka Chance		Telugu	
2013	Atharintiki Daredi		Telugu	
2014	Yevadu	"Freedom"	Telugu	
2014	Race Gurram	"Cinema Choopistha Mava"	Telugu	
2014	Govindudu Andarivadele	"Ra Rakumara"	Telugu	
2014	Joru		Telugu	
2014	Current Theega			
2014	Jai Ho	"Photocopy"	Hindi	
2014	Pilla Nuvvu Leni Jeevitham	"Dilse Dilse"	Telugu	
2014	Oohalu Gusagusalade		Telugu	
2015	Pataas	"Arey O Samba(Remix)"	Telugu	
2015	Temper	"Temper Title Track"	Telugu	
2015	Rey		Telugu	
2015	S/O Satyamurthy	"Come To The Party", "Chal Chalo Chalo", "Vachchaadu"	Telugu	
2015	Dohchay	"Nacchite Ye Panaina", "Aanati Devadasu"	Telugu	
2015	Kick 2	"Kukkurukuru Kick"	Telugu	
2015	Pandaga Chesko	"Pandaga Chesko Title Track"	Telugu	
2015	Vinnavayya Rammaya		Telugu	
2015	Baahubali		Telugu	
2015	Sher	"Rama Rama Hare Rama"	Telugu	
2015	Bengal Tiger	"Raaye Raaye"	Telugu	
2015	Akhil	"Nennekkadunte", "Akkineni Akkineni"	Telugu	
2015	Bhale Bhale Magadivoy	"How How"	Telugu	
2015	Bruce Lee: The Fighter	"Bruce Lee Title Track", "Run"	Telugu	
2015	Shivam	"Shivam Shivam"	Telugu	
2016	Nannaku Prematho	"Love Dhebba"	Telugu	
2016	Lacchimdeviki O Lekkundi		Telugu	
2016	Speedunnodu	"Bachelore Babu"	Telugu	
2016	Krishnashtami	"Bava Bava Panneeru"	Telugu	
2016	Akira	"Yettakond Hogu"	Kannada	
2016	Sarrainodu	"You Are My MLA"	Telugu	
2016	Jakkanna	"Jakkana Title Track", "You Are My Darlingo", "Andham Tannullona"	Telugu	
2016	Babu Bangaram	"Tikku Tikkantu"	Telugu	
2016	Premam	"Evadu Evadu"	Telugu	
2017	Khaidi No. 150	"Sundari"	Telugu	
2017	Aakatayi	"Ammamo Ela"	Telugu	
2017	Raajakumara	"Appu Dance"	Kannada	
2017	Angel		Telugu	
2017	Rarandoi Veduka Chudham	"Breakup"	Telugu	
2017	Jayadev		Telugu	
2017	Gulaebaghavali	all songs	Tamil	
2018	Jai Simha	"Amma Kutti"	Telugu	
2018	Inttelligent	"Let's Do", "Chamak Chamak Cham"	Telugu	
2018	Rangasthalam	"Jigelu Rani"	Telugu	
2018	Rajaratha	"Mundhe Banni"	Kannada	
2018	MLA	"Hey Indu", "Girl Friend"	Telugu	
2018	Nela Ticket	"Nela Ticket Title Track"	Telugu	
2018	Aravinda Sametha Veera Raghava	"Reddy Ikkada Soodu"	Telugu	
2018	Hello Guru Prema Kosame	"Hello Guru Prema Kosame Title Track"	Telugu	
2018	Geetha Govindam	"What The Life"	Telugu	
2018	Maari 2	"Rowdy Baby"	Tamil	
2019	Natasaarvabhowma	"Open The Bottle"	Kannada	
2019	Dear Comrade	"Canteen"	Telugu	
2019	Majili	"Maayya Maayya"	Telugu	
2019	ISmart Shankar	"Ismart Shankar Title Track"	Telugu	
2019	Namma Veettu Pillai	"Gaanda Kannazhagi"	Tamil	
2019	90ML	"Vellipothundhe", "Singilu Singilu", "Vinipinchukoru"	Telugu	
2019	Ruler	"Padthadu Thaadu", "Sankranti"	Telugu	
2020	Pattas	"Chill Bro"	Tamil	
2020	Ala Vaikunthapurramuloo	"Butta Bomma"	Telugu	
2020	Bheeshma	"Whattey Beauty"	Telugu	
2020	Black Rose	"Naa Tappu Emunnadabba"	Telugu	
2021	Krack	"Bhoom Bhaddhal"	Telugu	
2021	Red	"Dinchak"	Telugu	
2021	Chaavu Kaburu Challaga	"Paina Pataaram"	Telugu	
2021	Alludu Adhurs	"Title song"	Telugu	
2021	Uppena		Telugu	
2021	Yuvarathnaa	"Feel The Power", "Oorigobba Raja"	Kannada	
2021	Radhe	"Seeti Maar"	Hindi	
2021	Vikrant Rona		Kannada	
2021	Pakka Commercial	"Andala Rashi"	Telugu	
2021	Doctor	"Chellamma"	Tamil	
2021	Romantic		Telugu	
2021	Maha Samudram		Telugu	
2021	Pushpa: The Rise	"Srivalli"	Telugu	
2022	Rowdy Boys	"Date Night"	Telugu	
2022	Khiladi		Telugu	
2022	Macherla Niyojakavargam	"Ra Ra Reddy I'm Ready"	Telugu	
2022	Maaran	Polladha Ulagam	Tamil	
2022	Etharkkum Thunindhavan	"Summa Surrunu"	Tamil	
2022	Beast	"Arabic Kuthu", "Jolly O Gymkhana"	Tamil	
2022	Vikrant Rona	"Ra Ra Rakkamma"	Kannada	
2022	The Warriorr	"Whistle Song"	Telugu / Tamil	
2022	Thiruchitrambalam	"Megham Karukkatha"	Tamil	
2022	Viruman	"Madura Veeran"	Tamil	
2023	Varisu	"Ranjithame", "Thee Thalapathy"	Tamil	
2023	Kabzaa	"Chum Chum Chali Chali"	Kannada	
2023	Kisi Ka Bhai Kisi Ki Jaan	"Yentamma", "Billi Billi", "Bathukamma"	Hindi	
2023	Kathar Basha Endra Muthuramalingam	"Karikuzhambu Vaasam"	Tamil	
2023	Rangabali	"Mana Orilo Evadra Apedhi"	Telugu	
2023	Jailer	"Kaavaalaa"	Tamil	
2023	Extra Ordinary Man	"Ole Ole Paapaayi"	Telugu	
2024	Teri Baaton Mein Aisa Uljha Jiya	"Laal Peeli Akhiyaan", "Title Track"	Hindi	
2024	Tillu Square	"Ticket Eh Konakunda"	Telugu	
2024	The Family Star	"Nandanandana","Kalyani Vecha Vecha"	Telugu	
2024	Stree 2	"Aai Nai"	Hindi	
2024	Khel Khel Mein	"Do U Know"	Hindi	
2024	Double iSmart	"SteppaMaar", "Big Bull"	Telugu	
2024	Bhool Bhulaiyaa 3	"Title Track 3.0"	Hindi	
2024	Baby John	"Nain Matakka"	Hindi	
2024	Matka	"Le Le Raja"	Telugu	
2025	Game Changer	"Dhop"	Telugu	
2025	Sky Force	"Rang"	Hindi	
2025	Jack		Telugu	
2025	Jaat	"Touch Kiya"	Hindi	
2025	Param Sundari	"Dange"	Hindi	
2025	KD: The Devil		Kannada	
2025	Mass Jathara	"Ole Ole"	Telugu	
2025	Thamma	"Poison Baby", "Tum Mere Na Huye"	Hindi	
2025	Your's Sincerely RAAM		Kannada	
2025	Andhra King Taluka	"Chinni Gundelo"	Telugu	
2025	Peddi	"Chikiri Chikiri"	Telugu	
2025	45	"AFRO Tapaang"	Kannada	
2025	Royal		Kannada	
2026	O'Romeo	"Aashiqon Ki Colony", "Paan Ki Dukaan"	Hindi	
2026	Love Insurance Kompany		Tamil	

=== Television ===
Year	Title	Role	Network	Language	Notes	Ref.
2007	Dhee	Choreographer	ETV	Telugu		
2016	Dhee Juniors 2	Mentor	ETV	Telugu	For new entry	
2016	Dhee Jodi	Mentor	ETV	Telugu	For new entry	
2017	Neethone Dance	Judge	Star Maa	Telugu		
2019	Jabardasth	Judge	ETV	Telugu		
2020	Sa Re Ga Ma Pa The Next Singing ICON	Guest	Zee Telugu	Telugu	Episode 12	
2021	Dhee Dancing Icon	Judge	ETV	Telugu		

== Awards and nominations ==
Year	Award	Category	Work	Result	Ref.
2011	CineMAA Awards	Best Choreographer	Maryada Ramanna	Won	
2012	Nandi Awards	Best Choreographer	"Mee Intiki Mundhu" from Julayi	Won	
2013	60th Filmfare Awards South	Best Choreography	"Dillaku Dillaku" from Racha	Won	
2014	3rd South Indian International Movie Awards	Best Dance Choreographer–Telugu	"Laila O Laila" from Naayak	Won	
2014	Santosham Film Awards	Best Choreography Award	Naayak	Won	
2015	4th South Indian International Movie Awards	Best Dance Choreographer–Telugu	"Cinema Choopista Maava" from Race Gurram	Won	
2015	CineMAA Awards	Best Choreographer	Race Gurram	Won	
2015	13th Santosham Film Awards	Best Choreography	Race Gurram	Won	
2016	5th South Indian International Movie Awards	Best Dance Choreographer –Telugu	"Temper Title Track" from Temper	Won	
2018	Ananda Vikatan Cinema Awards	Best Dance Choreographer	"Guleba" from Gulaebaghavali	Won	
2019	66th Filmfare Awards South	Best Choreography	"Rowdy Baby" from Maari 2	Won	
2023	Ananda Vikatan Cinema Awards	Best Dance Choreographer	"Megam Karukkatha" from Thiruchitrambalam	Won	
2022	67th Filmfare Awards South	Best Choreography	"Feel the Power" from Yuvarathnaa	Won	
2024	70th National Film Awards	Best Choreography	"Megam Karukkatha" from Thiruchitrambalam	(Note: The award committee has suspended the National Award and has withdrawn the invitation to attend the award ceremony, due to the allegations of crime against him under the POCSO act.)	
2025	Times of India Film Awards	Excellence in Choreography	"Aayi Nai" from Stree 2	Won	
2025	Chittara Music Awards	Creative Choreographer	Entire Career	Won	
