= Ponnappa =

Ponnappa is a surname. Notable people with the surname include:

== Real people ==
- Ashwini Ponnappa (born 1989), Indian badminton player
- Bansi Ponnappa, Indian army officer
- N. Ponnappa, Indian freelance cartoonist
- Rajshri Ponnappa, Indian actress
- Veena Ponnappa, actress in 2022 Indian film Vedha
- Yasmin Ponnappa, Indian model

== Mythological ==
- Kalyatanda Ponnappa, 17th-century warrior god
