= Prem Rakshith =

Indian choreographer (born 1977)

- Born: Ramesh sathish 14 December 1977 (age 48); Pondicherry, India
- Occupation: Choreographer
- Years active: 1993–present

Prem Rakshith (born Ramesh Sathish) is an Indian choreographer who works predominantly in Telugu cinema. He is recipient of a National Film Award, three Nandi Awards and six Filmfare Awards.

== Early life and career ==
Prem Rakshith was born in Pondicherry and raised in Chennai. His real name is Ramesh Sathish, and was actually born as a Hindu, before his grandmother got the entire family converted to Roman Catholic.and named as Saghaya Thomas but he continued his name as Ramesh Sathish and for the movies he called as Prem Rakshith

Prem received acclaim for his work on "Naatu Naatu" from RRR (2022). The hook step involving N. T. Rama Rao Jr. and Ram Charan dancing together became popular. "Naatu Naatu" became the first song from an Indian film to win the Academy Award for Best Original Song. Rakshith was credited as a choreographer at the ceremony, where "Naatu Naatu" went on to win. It has also won the Best Original Song award at the 80th Golden Globe Awards, making it the first Asian as well as the first Indian song to win the award. He was invited to join the Academy of Motion Picture Arts and Sciences in June 2024.

== Filmography ==
Year	Title	Language
2005	Chatrapathi	Telugu
2006	Vikramarkudu	Telugu
2007	Madhumasam	Telugu
2007	Satyabhama	Telugu
2007	Yamadonga	Telugu
2007	Mantra	Telugu
2007	Pourudu	Telugu
2007	Azhagiya Tamil Magan	Tamil
2008	Aatadista	Telugu
2008	Bhale Dongalu	Telugu
2008	Kalidasu	Telugu
2008	Kuruvi	Tamil
2008	Parugu	Telugu
2008	Ready	Telugu
2008	Baladoor	Telugu
2008	Avakai Biryani	Telugu
2008	Hero	Telugu
2009	Billa	Telugu
2009	Current	Telugu
2009	Magadheera	Telugu
2009	Ganesh	Telugu
2009	Rechipo	Telugu
2009	Mahathma	Telugu
2009	Kasko	Telugu
2009	Kurradu	Telugu
2009	Arya 2	Telugu
2010	Kedi	Telugu
2010	Adhurs	Telugu
2010	Darling	Telugu
2010	Varudu	Telugu
2010	Simha	Telugu
2010	Sura	Tamil
2010	Maryada Ramanna	Telugu
2010	Don Seenu	Telugu
2010	Brindaavanam	Telugu
2010	Khaleja	Telugu
2011	100% Love	Telugu
2011	Badrinath	Telugu
2011	Shakti	Telugu
2011	Seema Tapakai	Telugu
2011	Dhada	Telugu
2011	Kandireega	Telugu
2011	Bezawada	Telugu
2011	Velayudham	Tamil
2012	Poola Rangadu	Telugu
2012	Ishq	Telugu
2012	Naa Ishtam	Telugu
2012	Lovely	Telugu
2012	Rachcha	Telugu
2012	Dhammu	Telugu
2012	Endhukante Premanta	Telugu
2012	Saguni	Tamil
2012	Tuneega Tuneega	Telugu
2012	Dhenikaina Ready	Telugu
2013	Seethamma Vakitlo Sirimalle Chettu	Telugu
2013	Baadshah	Telugu
2013	Doosukeltha	Telugu
2014	Veeram	Tamil
2014	1: Nenokkadine	Telugu
2014	Aagadu	Telugu
2014	Alludu Sreenu	Telugu
2015	Baahubali: The Beginning	Telugu
2016	Dictator	Telugu
2017	Baahubali 2: The Conclusion	Telugu
2017	Mersal	Tamil
2018	Rangasthalam	Telugu
2021	Annaatthe	Tamil
2021	Gully Rowdy	Telugu
2022	RRR	Telugu
2022	Acharya	Telugu
2023	Veera Simha Reddy	Telugu
2023	Dasara	Telugu
2023	Skanda	Telugu
2024		Telugu
2024	Pushpa 2: The Rule	Telugu
2024	Kanguva	Tamil
2026	The RajaSaab	Telugu

== Awards and nominations ==
Year	Award	Category	Films	Result
2007	CineMAA Awards	Best Choreographer	Yamadonga ("Nachore Nachore")	Won
2007	Filmfare Awards South	Best Choreography	Azhagiya Tamil Magan ("Ella Pugazhum")	Won
2008	Filmfare Awards South	Best Choreography	Kantri ("Vayasunami")	Won
2008	Santosham Film Awards	Best Choreographer	Kantri and Takkari	Won
2008	Nandi Award	Best Choreographer	Kantri	Won
2009	Filmfare Awards South	Best Dance Choreographer	Arya 2 ("Mr. Perfect")	Won
2010	Nandi Award	Best Choreography	Adhurs ("Assalaam Valekum")	Won
2011	Filmfare Awards South	Best Choreography	Badrinath ("Nath Nath Badrinath")	Won
2014	Nandi Award	Best Choreographer	Aagadu	Won
2015	Nandi Award	Best Choreographer	Baahubali: The Beginning	Won
2015	Santosham Film Awards	Best Choreographer	Baahubali: The Beginning	Won
2018	Santosham Film Awards	Best Choreographer	Rangasthalam ("Rangamma Mangamma")	Won
2023	National Film Awards	Best Choreography	RRR ("Naatu Naatu")	Won
2024	Filmfare Awards South	Best Choreography	RRR ("Naatu Naatu")	Won
2024	Filmfare Awards South	Best Choreography	Dasara ("Dhoom Dhaam Dosthaan")	Won
