= Maari 2 =

2018 Indian film by Balaji Mohan

- Theatrical release poster
- Directed by: Balaji Mohan
- Written by: Balaji Mohan Samrat, Rajesh Malakedi & Karthik (Telugu Dialogues)
- Produced by: Dhanush
- Starring: Dhanush; Tovino Thomas; Krishna; Sai Pallavi; Varalaxmi Sarathkumar
- Cinematography: Om Prakash
- Edited by: Prasanna GK
- Music by: Yuvan Shankar Raja
- Production company: Wunderbar Films
- Release date: 21 December 2018
- Running time: 140 minutes
- Country: India
- Language: Tamil

Maari 2 is a 2018 Indian Tamil-language action comedy film written and directed by Balaji Mohan. It is a sequel to his 2015 film Maari. Dhanush, besides producing the film under his company Wunderbar Films, also stars as the title character, continuing his role from the first film with Sai Pallavi played a female lead. The film also stars Tovino Thomas, Krishna, Varalaxmi Sarathkumar, Vidya Pradeep, Robo Shankar, Kalloori Vinoth, Kaali Venkat, Master Raghavan and others. The music was composed by Yuvan Shankar Raja, the cinematography was handled by Om Prakash and editing by Prasanna GK. The film was released on 21 December 2018 and received mixed reviews from critics.

== Plot ==
Maariyappan "Maari" is a fun-loving gangster whose sidekicks are Sanikkizhamai and Robert, also known as Adithangi (the punching bag). His best friend is Kalai. Maari is chased around by Araathu Aanandi, an auto rickshaw driver who is totally in love with him. However, despite her efforts, he does not give her a second glance and constantly shows his annoyance toward her.

Meanwhile, gangster Gangadhar Beeja alias "Thanatos" escapes from prison after killing two officers. He is out for vengeance against Maari as his brother, a defence lawyer, promised to get Beeja released from jail. However, his brother is killed at the hands of Maari as the former tried to molest Aanandi's elder sister (which is unknown to Beeja). This is why Aanandi loves Maari. While returning from a party, Maari is attacked, and Aanandi takes him to the hospital and takes care of him. Kalai's brother Vallavan is shown to be cooperating with Singayya, who has allied with Beeja to overthrow Maari.

Per Beeja's plan, Vallavan asks Sani to send Aanandi for a job, which turns out to be drug smuggling. She unknowingly goes to do the job and gets caught by Kalai. Upon being confronted, she tells him that Maari asked her to do it. This sparks doubt for Kalai. Vallavan is caught by Maari carrying drugs, and when Maari confronts Kalai, a fight erupts. Maari kills Singayya, his sidekicks set fire to all the drugs, and Beeja kills Vallavan, making it look as though Maari killed him. Kalai becomes enraged and orders his men to kill Maari, who is injured in the battle. Beeja reveals himself as the perpetrator and shoots at Maari, but Aanandi saves him by taking the bullet meant for him, which leaves her paralysed for life.

Vijaya Chamundeshwari is the newly appointed District Collector, who comes to restore order and stop all gang violence. Maari goes into hiding with Aanandi. Eight years pass, and Beeja and Kalai have grown to become powerful gangsters. When Kalai has a chance to become a legislative candidate of the ruling party, Beeja takes the opportunity to threaten Kalai and his family. Vijaya, now the Deputy Home Secretary, to find Maari, posts his picture along with Aanandi's in newspapers. Maari meets Vijaya and requests that she remove the photos. He then reveals what happened.

Maari and Aanandi get married, and they live in Tenkasi with an elderly couple. Aanandi gets pregnant, and a healthy baby boy is born. However, due to complications from paralysis, Aanandi dies minutes after childbirth. Maari then raises the boy, called Kaali, with help from the old couple, Sani and Robert. Kaali is shown to have inherited Maari's behavior and continues to pick fights in school. Maari then requests that Vijaya stop coming after him, as he has changed his ways. When Kaali sees some students teasing a teacher, he complains to the principal about them. In retaliation, the boys chase and attack him, only to get beaten by Kaali. The local council member, who is also the father of one of the boys, summons Kaali to beat him up, but Maari goes and begs for forgiveness.

Meanwhile, the city police commissioner mentions to the media that there is an informant within Beeja's gang. Using his moles in the police department, Beeja tries to figure out who the mole is, but fails. It is then revealed that there was no mole and that the whole story was fabricated to identify corrupt policemen in the department, including the commissioner. Further, it is revealed that Beeja has had ties with the commissioner and was the mole himself. He had been leaking information about his men to clear his name and become a candidate for the position.

It is also revealed that despite begging for forgiveness, the counsellor insists on his son beating up Kaali, and so Maari beats up the counsellor and his henchmen. In a final encounter, the police turn against Beeja. Maari fights Beeja and paralyzes him in revenge for Aanandi, revealing to him that Maari had killed his brother to prevent him from killing Beeja for his wealth. Soon, Beeja gets sentenced to life in prison, and Maari is shown with his sidekicks, continuing his old life and reuniting with Kalai.

== Cast ==
- Dhanush as Maariyappan "Maari"
- Tovino Thomas as Gangadhar Bheeja alias Thanatos
- Sai Pallavi as "Araathu" Aanandi, Maari's wife
- Varalaxmi Sarathkumar as Vijaya Chamundeswari IAS
- Krishna as Kalai
- Vidya Pradeep as Anbarasi, Kalai's wife
- Robo Shankar as Sanikkizhamai (Sani)
- Kalloori Vinoth as Robert (Adithangi)
- Kaali Venkat as Sub-Inspector Aarumugam
- Master Raghavan as Kaali Maariyappan, Maari and Aanandhi's son
- Manobala as Kaali's school principal
- Aadukalam Naren as the corrupt police commissioner
- E. Ramdoss as Assistant Police Commissioner
- Aranthangi Nisha as Attu Aanandi
- Vincent Asokan as Beeja's brother
- Avinash Raghudevan as Vallavan, Kalai's brother
- Ajay Ghosh as Singayya
- Stunt Silva as Singayya's hitman
- Stalin Muthu as Counsellor
- Sangili Murugan as House Owner
- Sethu Lakshmi as House Owner
- Rock Prabhu as Police Inspector
- Pasi Sathya as Nurse
- M. Kamaraj as Prisoner

== Production ==
=== Development ===
Following the release of Maari, director Balaji Mohan announced the sequel Maari 2 in November 2015, with Dhanush again in the lead, and also hinted that the sequel would begin shooting from January 2016. The film's script was finalised in December 2016. In September 2017, Balaji said via a tweet that the film would be a bilingual film in Tamil and Telugu; however, the Telugu version was later dropped.

=== Casting ===
On 24 September 2017, it was announced that Malayalam actor Tovino Thomas had joined the cast, portraying the antagonist. A few days later, Sai Pallavi was finalised as the heroine. Later, actor Krishna joined the cast on 7 October 2017, and Varalaxmi Sarathkumar joined the cast in December 2017.

Anirudh Ravichander, who composed for the film's first installment, was expected to join its successor. However, Mohan announced in December 2017 that Yuvan Shankar Raja would be the composer of Maari 2. Om Prakash and Prasanna GK were chosen as the cinematographer and editor respectively, and A. Amaran was as the art director.

=== Filming ===
The film's puja ceremony took place on 14 December 2017, and principal photography began on 22 January 2018. The first filming schedule took place in Tenkasi. Varalaxmi began shooting for her portions in mid-February. The makers completed 40% of the filming before a strike by the Tamil Film Producers Council occurred on 16 March 2018, with shooting resuming in April after the strike was called off. Dhanush sustained an injury in June after filming a fight sequence, but said the injury was minor. The music sequence for "Rowdy Baby" was filmed on 2 August, under the supervision of dance choreographer Prabhu Deva. After the sequence was filmed, the makers wrapped principal photography on 24 August 2018.

== Music ==
Maari 2

Soundtrack album by Yuvan Shankar Raja
- Released: 5 November 2018
- Recorded: 2018
- Genre: Feature film soundtrack
- Length: 12:45
- Language: Tamil
- Labels: Wunderbar Studios; Divo
- Producers: Yuvan Shankar Raja; Dhanush

Yuvan Shankar Raja chronology
Sandakozhi 2 (2018)	Maari 2 (2018)	Kanne Kalaimaane (2019)

Singles from Maari 2
- 1. "Rowdy Baby" Released: 25 October 2018

Yuvan Shankar Raja composed the soundtrack album and background score for Maari 2, collaborating with Dhanush again after a 10-year hiatus, since their last film Yaaradi Nee Mohini (2008). The audio rights to the film are secured by the production house's subsidiary audio label Wunderbar Studios, with Divo as their digital partner. The album features three tracks written by Dhanush and Raja himself and was released on 5 November 2018, except for "Rowdy Baby", sung by Dhanush and Dhee, which was released as a single on 25 October 2018.

The music video for the single was released on YouTube in January 2019 and received positive reviews for the choreography as well as its cinematography. On 24 September 2023, the song became the first South Indian film song to clock over 1.5 billion views on YouTube. The other two songs written by Dhanush or Raja, "Maari Gethu" sung by Dhanush, Chinnaponnu, V.M. Mahalingam and Yuvan Shankar Raja, with lyrics penned by the latter and "Maari's Anandhi", written by Dhanush, and sung by Ilaiyaraaja and M. M. Manasi, were released as a part of the album.

Track listing
No.	Title	Lyrics	Singer(s)	Length
1.	"Rowdy Baby"	Dhanush	Dhanush, Dhee	4:41
2.	"Maari Gethu"	Yuvan Shankar Raja	Dhanush, Yuvan Shankar Raja, Chinnaponnu, V. M. Mahalingam	3:46
3.	"Maari's Anandhi"	Dhanush	Ilaiyaraaja, M. M. Manasi	4:19
Total length:				12:45

== Release and reception ==
Maari 2 was released on 21 December 2018. Srivatsan of The Hindu called the film a significant improvement over its predecessor, but criticised its second half, and overuse of characters. Anusha Iyengar of Times Now also called the film significantly better than its predecessor, especially with regards to Dhanush's performance and also praised the treatment of Tovino Thomas and Sai Pallavi's characters, but criticised the use of slow motion in the majority of fight scenes and felt the plot was becoming predictable. M. Suganth of The Times of India rated the film 2.5 stars out of 5, appreciating the "dignified" treatment of Sai Pallavi's character, but felt Varalakshmi was underutilised, and criticised the film's second half.

== Accolades ==
Date of ceremony	Award	Category	Recipient(s) and nominee(s)	Result	Ref.
21 December 2019	66th Filmfare Awards South	Best Choreography	Prabhu Deva & Jani Master for "Rowdy Baby"	Won	
21 December 2019	66th Filmfare Awards South	Best Male Playback Singer – Tamil	Dhanush for "Rowdy Baby"	Nominated	
21 December 2019	66th Filmfare Awards South	Best Female Playback Singer – Tamil	Dhee for "Rowdy Baby"	Nominated	
21 December 2019	66th Filmfare Awards South	Best Actress – Tamil	Sai Pallavi	Nominated	
