= Yamaleela 2 =

2014 Telugu film by S. V. Krishna Reddy

- యమలీల 2
- Directed by: S. V. Krishna Reddy
- Written by: S. V. Krishna Reddy
- Produced by: K. V. Satish; K. Atchi Reddy
- Starring: K. V. Satish; Diah Nicholas; Mohan Babu; Brahmanandam
- Cinematography: Srikanth Naroj
- Edited by: Gautham Raju
- Music by: S. V. Krishna Reddy
- Production company: Krishvi films
- Release date: 28 November 2014
- Country: India
- Language: Telugu
- Budget: ₹18 crore

Yamaleela 2 is a 2014 Indian Telugu-language fantasy drama film written, directed, and composed by S. V. Krishna Reddy. A spiritual sequel to the 1994 film Yamaleela, it features K. V. Satish, Diah Nicholas, Mohan Babu and Brahmanandam in key roles. Mohan Babu portrays Yama, a role previously played by Kaikala Satyanarayana, while Brahmanandam reprises his role as Chitragupta from the original.

The story follows a medical professional, Krish, on a quest to save his leukemia-stricken niece using a mythical herb, while evading Yama and Chitragupta, who seek to reclaim a sacred book in his possession. Produced on a significant budget of ₹18 crore, the film marked the return of S. V. Krishna Reddy to Telugu cinema after a five-year hiatus and featured a larger production scale than its predecessor. The film received lukewarm reviews, but Mohan Babu's performance was praised.

== Plot ==
The film follows Krish, a medical professional determined to find a cure for leukemia to save his ailing niece. He is supported in his efforts by his colleague and love interest, Diah Nicolas. Driven by desperation, Krish embarks on a journey to the Himalayas, specifically to Manasarovar Lake, to retrieve Sanjeevani, a mythical herb believed to have the potential to cure leukemia.

During his quest, Krish also comes into possession of a sacred book that originally belongs to Yama, the God of Death. The story then shifts focus to Yama and his aide Chitragupta, who set out to reclaim the book from Krish. As Krish faces numerous challenges, he must not only evade Yama's attempts to retrieve the book but also overcome his own limitations to ensure he can use the herb and save his niece before time runs out.

== Cast ==
- K. V. Satish as Krish
- Diah Nicholas as Anandi
- Mohan Babu as Yama
- Bramhanandam as Chitragupta
- Sadha
- Sayaji Shinde
- Nisha Kothari
- Kota Srinivasa Rao
- Ali
- M. S. Narayana
- Rao Ramesh
- Ashish Vidyarthi
- Uttej
- Thagubothu Ramesh

== Production ==
Two decades after the release of Yamaleela (1994), a spiritual sequel titled Yamaleela 2 was produced. Unlike the original, the sequel featured a new lead actor, K. V. Satish, a businessman and newcomer. S. V. Krishna Reddy, who had directed, written, and composed music for the original film, returned to fulfill the same roles for the sequel. Although not a continuation of the original story, the film retained similar themes and plot elements.

The budget for Yamaleela 2 was approximately ₹18 crore, a significant increase compared to the ₹75 lakh budget of the original film. The scale of production was expanded to accommodate an international release, with screenings planned in the United States and Europe. Despite reports of delays due to the film exceeding its budget, production proceeded as scheduled. Returning to direction after a five-year hiatus, S. V. Krishna Reddy sought to replicate the original film's success and deliver a larger-scale production.

== Music ==
1. "Krishnam Bhaje"
2. "Prana Bandama"
3. "Hai Haigaa"
4. "Daari Podugu"
5. "Nuvvu Navvithe"
6. "O Thayaru"
7. "Andanda Pindanda"
8. "Alara Chanchalamaina"

== Reception ==
The Times of India wrote, "Yamaleela 2 lacks energy and some of the scenes are so outdated that you begin to wonder if the film itself is stuck in a time warp just like its characters" and rated with 2 out of 5. Deccan Chronicle said, "Film lacks freshness with the slow narration and when compared to the first one, this Yamaleela 2 is no match to it. You can watch it for only Mohan Babu’s impressive performance" and rated 2.5 out of 5.
