= Suchitra Chandrabose =

Indian Telugu choreographer

- Born: Suchitra
- Occupations: choreographer, director
- Spouse: Chandrabose
- Awards: Filmfare awards

Suchitra Chandrabose is an Indian choreographer, and film director from Andhra Pradesh. She is married to lyricist Chandrabose. She also directed the film Pallakilo Pellikuthuru. She won two Nandi Awards and one Filmfare Award for Best Choreography.

She started her career as a choreographer with the film Aakhari Poratam (1988).

== Filmography ==
=== Choreographer ===
- Aakhari Poratam (1988)
- Chaitanya (1991)
- One by two (1993)
- Money (1993)
- Gandeevam (1994)
- Theerpu (1994)
- Gharana Bullodu (1995)
- Vajram (1995)
- Sampradayam (1996)
- Ramudochadu (1996)
- Vinodam (1996)
- Abbaygari Pelli (1997)
- Annamayya (1997)
- Chinnabbayi (1997)
- Gilli Kajjalu (1998)
- Paradesi (1998)
- Shrimati Vellosta (1999)
- Sardukupodaam Randi (2000)
- Jayam Manadera (2000)
- Priyamaina Neeku (2001)
- Ninnu Choodalani (2001)
- Nuvvu Naaku Nachav (2001)
- Manasantha Nuvve (2001)
- Nuvvu Leka Nenu Lenu (2002)
- Nuvve Nuvve (2002)
- Adrushtam (2002)
- Ninne Istapaddanu (2003)
- Neeku Nenu Naaku Nuvvu (2003)
- Ela Cheppanu (2003)
- Pallakilo Pellikoothuru (2004)
- Vaana (2008)
- Rainbow (2008)
- Jhummandi Naadam (2010)
- Gopala Gopala
- Ra Ra... Krishnayya
- Arrdham (2021)

=== Director ===
- Pallakilo Pellikoothuru

== Awards ==
Nandi Awards

- Best Choreographer – Nuvvu Naaku Nachav (2001)
- Best Choreographer – Yamaleela (1994)

Filmfare Award South

- Best Choreography – Ooyala (1998)
