= Varamala =

Sanskrit term for a wedding garland

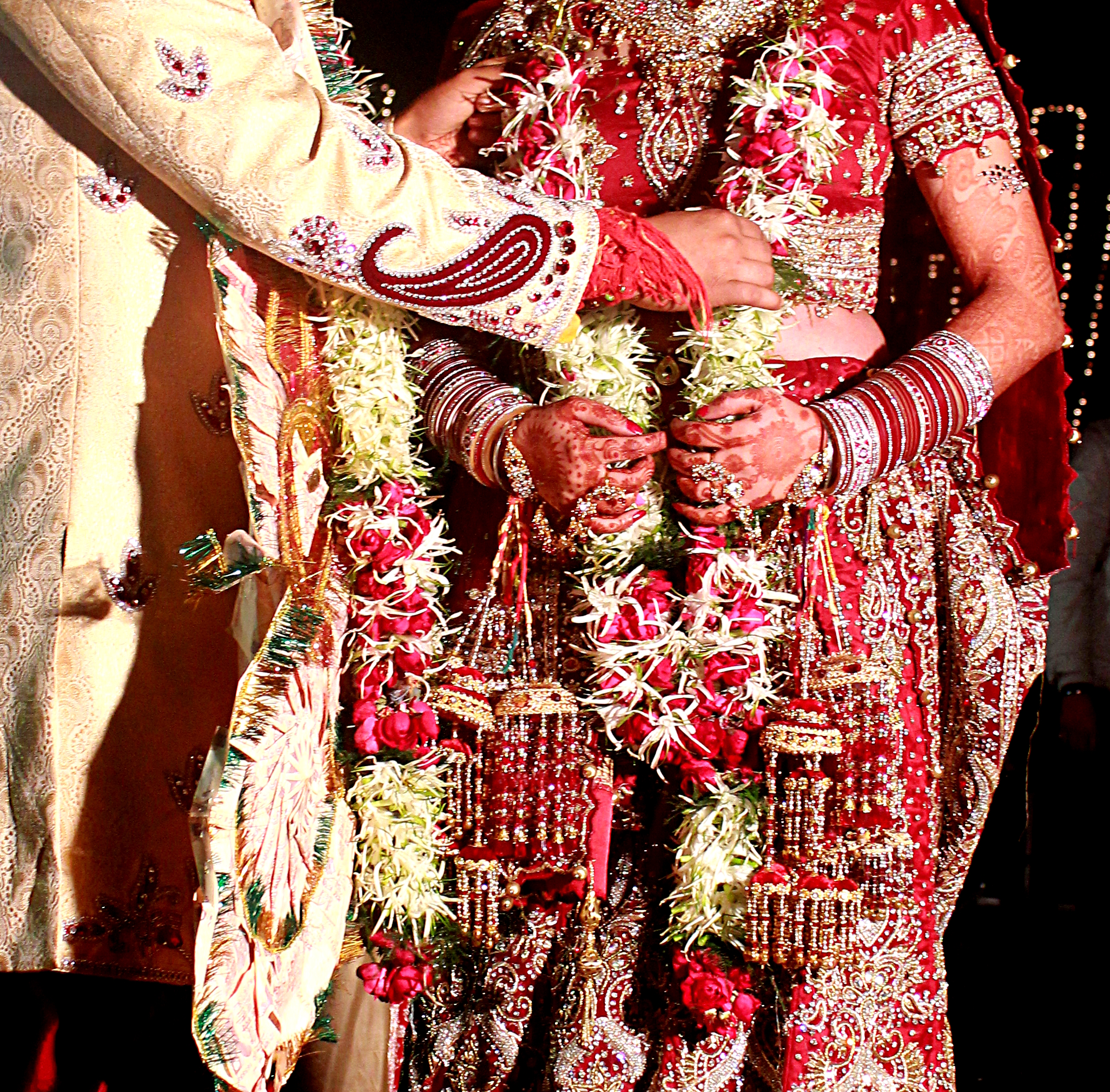
A modern jayamala ceremony during a Hindu wedding.

A varamala (Sanskrit: वरमाला, romanized: Varamālā, lit. 'boon garland') or a jayamala (Sanskrit: जयमाला, romanized: Jayamālā, lit. 'victory garland') is an Ancient Indian garland that is most commonly associated with its eponymous ritual during a Hindu wedding ceremony. Traditionally, a varamala is made of roses and other flowers, though modern variations exist, such as garlands made from rupee notes, and other regional traditions.

The jayamala ceremony is a well-known ritual during a Hindu wedding, where a bride and a groom exchange garlands, as an indication of acceptance of each other as their spouse, and a pledge to respect them throughout the rest of their lives.

== Hinduism ==
During the Samudra Manthanam, the legend of the churning of the ocean, the newly emerged Lakshmi garlands Vishnu with her varamala of lotus flowers, accepting him to be her divine consort.

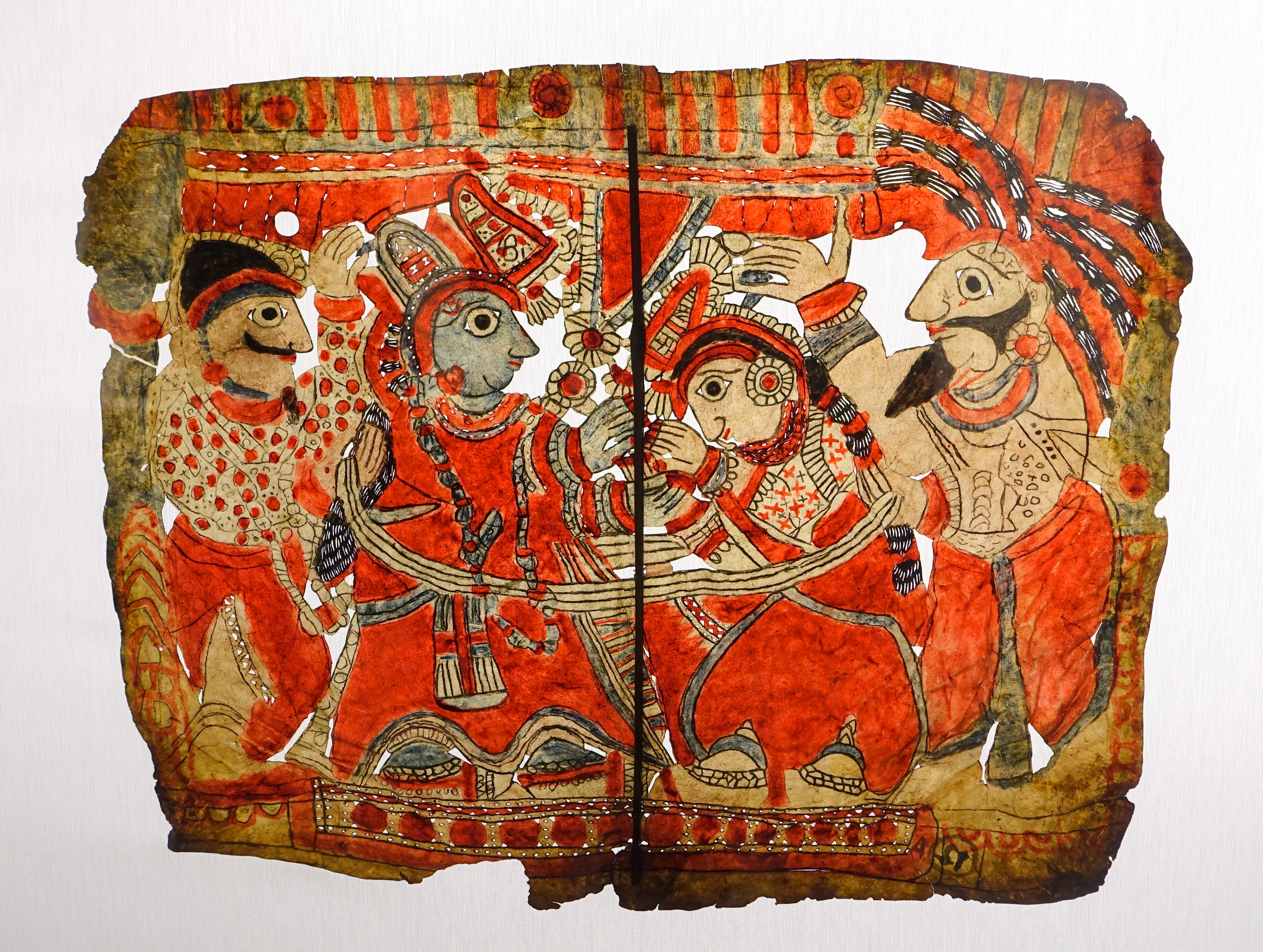
Exhibit of Rama and Sita exchanging varamalas.

In the adaptation of the Ramayana hy Bulbul Sharma, Sita places a varamala around the neck of Rama after he wins her hand in the Sita Swayamvara, breaking the Pinaka bow (this ritual is not present in the original Ramayana).

In the Mahabharata, Draupadi chooses Arjuna to be her husband by garlanding him during her svayamvara.

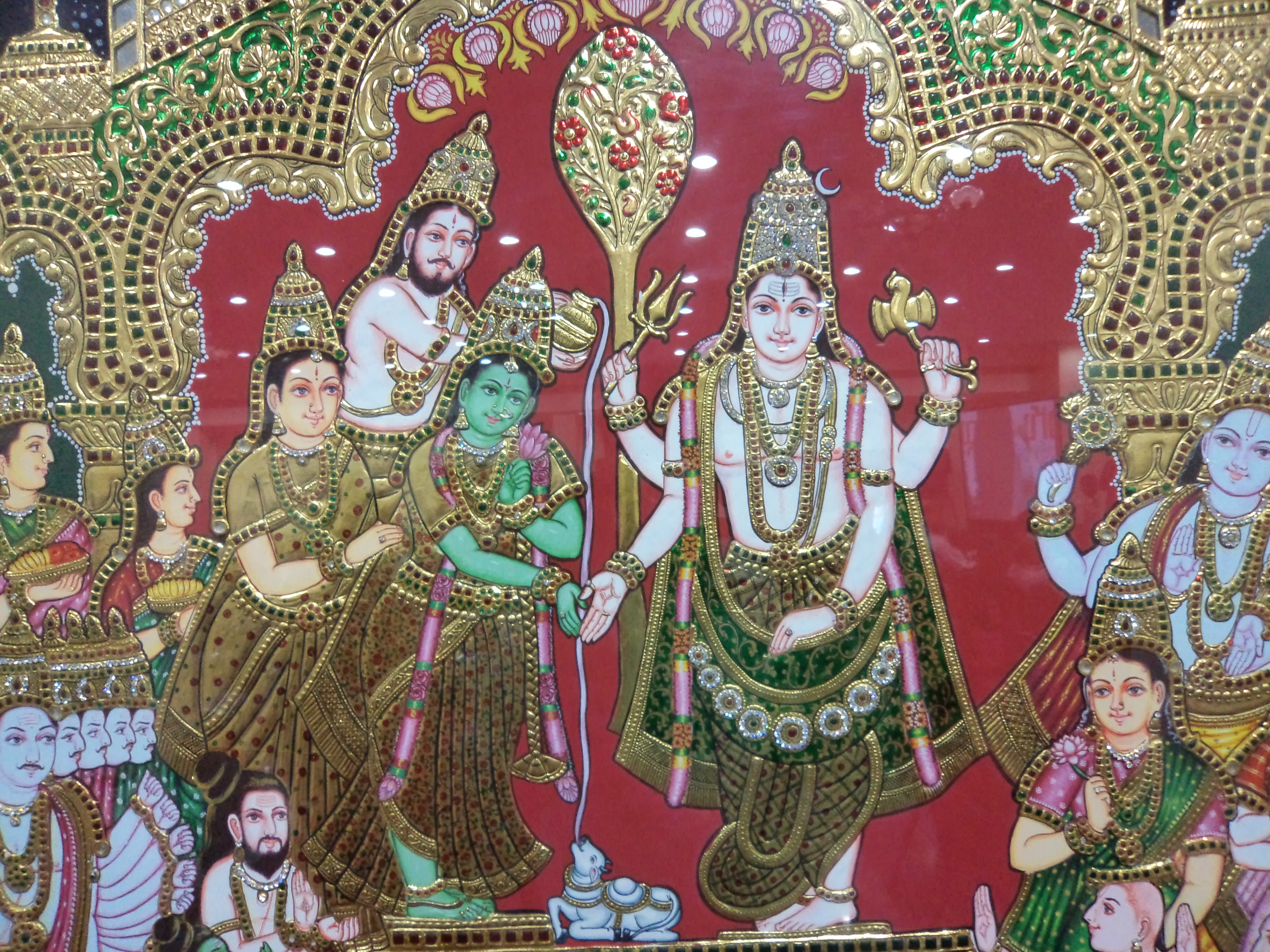
Parvati and Shiva wearing varamalas during their kalyanam.

The wedding of Shiva and Parvati is also described to have occurred with the ritual of the garland exchange.

A gandharva marriage in Hinduism is a non-righteous form of marriage recognised by the Manusmriti, where lovers marry by exchanging garlands, without the consent of their families or performance of rituals.
