= Kanjirangad, Mananthavady =

Kanjirangad
- village
- Country: India
- State: Kerala
- District: Wayanad

Population (2011)
  - Total: 11,811

Languages
  - Official: Malayalam, English
- Time zone: UTC+5:30 (IST)
- PIN: 6XXXXX
- ISO 3166 code: IN-KL
- Vehicle registration: KL-

Kanjirangad is a village in Wayanad district in the state of Kerala, India.

== Demographics ==
As of 2011 India census, Kanjirangad had a population of 11811 with 5877 males and 5934 females.

== Transportation ==
Kanjirangad can be accessed from Mananthavady or Kalpetta. The Periya ghat road connects Mananthavady to Kannur and Thalassery. The Thamarassery mountain road connects Calicut with Kalpetta. The Kuttiady mountain road connects Vatakara with Kalpetta and Mananthavady. The Palchuram mountain road connects Kannur and Iritty with Mananthavady. The road from Nilambur to Ooty is also connected to Wayanad through the village of Meppadi.

The nearest railway station is at Mysore and the nearest airports are Kozhikode International Airport-120 km, Bengaluru International Airport-290 km, and Kannur International Airport, 58 km.
