= List of multilingual Indian films =

This is a list of multilingual Indian films. The majority of films listed have been shot simultaneously alongside each other as a part of the same project—rather than being remade or dubbed at a later date.

== Bilingual films ==
- Note: this is a list of films made simultaneously in two different languages, not films containing dialogues in multiple languages.

=== Bengali and Hindi ===
Year	Bengali Title	Hindi Title	Director(s)	Ref.
1950	Samar	Mashaal	Nitin Bose	
1973	Achena Atithi	Anjaane Mehmaan	Sukhen Das & Gyanesh Mukherjee	
1975	Amanush	Amanush	Shakti Samanta	
1977	Ananda Ashram	Anand Ashram	Shakti Samanta	
1978	Laal Kuthi	Laal Kothi	Kanak Mukherjee	
1978	Bandie	Bandie	Alo Sircar	
1979	Krishna Sudama	Krishna Bhakt Sudama	Ardhendu Chatterjee	
1980	Kalkut	Cobra	Batra Mahinder	
1981	Anusandhan	Barsaat Ki Ek Raat	Shakti Samanta	
1982	Aarale Aabdaale	Aamne Samne	Ashim Samanta	
1984	Teen Murti	Jagir	Pramod Chakravorty	
1985	Phoolan Devi	Kahani Phoolvati Ki	Ashok Roy	
1985	Anyay Abichar	Aar Paar	Shakti Samanta	
1985	Maharudra	Maha Shaktimaan	V. S. R. Swamy	
1986	Door-Desh	Gehri Chot	Amrish Sehgal / Ehtesham	
1989	Mastan	Aakhri Baazi	Ashim Samanta	
1990	Andha Bichar	Dushman	Shakti Samanta	
1993	Dalaal	Dalaal	Partho Ghosh	
2004	Ora Kara	Hum Kaun Hai?	Ravi Shankar Sharma	
2013	The Light: Swami Vivekananda	The Light: Swami Vivekananda	Utpal Sinha	
2013	Sunglass	Taak Jhaank	Rituparno Ghosh	

=== Bengali and English ===
Year	English title	Bengali Title	Director(s)	Notes	Ref.
TBA	It Was Raining That Night	It Was Raining That Night	Mahesh Manjrekar	Both versions unreleased	

=== Bengali and Marathi ===
Year	Bengali Title	Marathi title	Director(s)	Notes	Ref.
TBA	Adrushya	Antardrishti	Kabir Lal	Bengali version unreleased	

=== Bengali and Odia ===
Year	Bengali Title	Odia Title	Director(s)	Ref.
2007	Kalishankar	Kalishankar	Prashanta Nanda	
2007	Pagal Premi	Pagala Premi	Hara Patnaik	

=== Bengali and Tamil ===
Year	Bengali Title	Tamil Title	Director(s)	Ref.
1951/53	Ratnadeep	Ratna Deepam	Debaki Bose	

=== English and Hindi ===
Year	Hindi Title	English title	Director(s)	Notes	Ref.
1978	Shalimar	Raiders of Sacred Stone	Krishna Shah		
1984	Utsav	—N/a	Girish Karnad	English version unreleased	

=== English and Malayalam ===
Year	Malayalam Title	English title	Director(s)	Ref.
2004	Nothing but Life	Made in USA	Rajiv Anchal	

=== English and Tamil ===
Year	Tamil Title	English title	Director(s)	Ref.
2013	Inam	Ceylon	Santosh Sivan	
2014	Ramanujan	Ramanujan	Gnana Rajasekaran	

=== Hindi and Gujarati ===
Year	Hindi Title	Gujarati Title	Director(s)	Ref.
1976	Rakshaa Bandhan	Khamma Mara Veera	Shantilal Soni	

=== Hindi and Marathi ===
Year	Hindi Title	Marathi Title	Director(s)	Ref.
1932	Ayodhya Ka Raja	Ayodhyecha Raja	V. Shantaram	
1932	Jalti Nishani	Agnikankan	V. Shantaram	
1933	Sairandhri	Sairandhri	V. Shantaram	
1935	Chandrasena	Chandrasena	V. Shantaram	
1937	Duniya Na Mane	Kunku	V. Shantaram	
1938	Brahmachari	Brahmachari	Master Vinayak	
1938	Saathi	Saavangadi	Parshwanath Atlekar	
1939	Aadmi	Manoos	V. Shantaram	
1941	Padosi	Shejari	V. Shantaram	
1947	Matwala Shair Ram Joshi	Lokshahir Ram Joshi	V. Shantaram	
1973	Pinjra	Pinjara	V. Shantaram	
1982	Subah	Umbartha	Jabbar Patel	
2000	Astitva	Astitva	Mahesh Manjrekar	
2010	City of Gold	Lalbaug Parel	Mahesh Manjrekar	
2019	Thackeray	Thackeray	Ashish Pense	
2022	Anya The Other	Anya	Simmy	
2023	Malhar	Malhar	Vishal Kumbhar	
2026	Veer Murarbaji: Purandar Ki Yuddhagatha	Veer Murarbaji: Purandar Chi Yuddhagatha	Ajay-Anirudh	
2026	Raja Shivaji	Raja Shivaji	Riteish Deshmukh	

=== Hindi and Kannada ===
Year	Kannada Title	Hindi Title	Director(s)	Ref.
1977	Tabbaliyu Neenade Magane	Godhuli	Girish Karnad - B. V. Karanth	
1982	Bara	Sookha	M. S. Sathyu	
1990	Mane	Ek Ghar	Girish Kasaravalli	
1991	Police Matthu Dada	Inspector Dhanush	Thulasi-Shyam	
1992	Vishnu Vijaya	Ashaant	Keshu Ramsay	
2015	Care of Footpath 2	Kill Them Young	Kishan Shrikanth	
2019	Mohandas	Mohandas	P. Sheshadri	
TBA	Amma	Amma	Faisal Saif	

=== Hindi and Punjabi ===
Year	Hindi Title	Punjabi Title	Director(s)	Ref.
2012	Woman From The East	Kudesan	Jeet Matharru	

=== Hindi and Odia ===
Year	Hindi Title	Odia Title	Director(s)	Ref.
1991	Aadi Mimansa	Aadi Mimansa	Apurba Kishore Bir	

=== Hindi and Persian ===
Year	Hindi Title	Persian Title	Director(s)	Ref.
1971	Subah-O-Shaam	Homaye Saadat	Tapi Chanakya	
1974	International Crook (Kala Bazaar)	Kolanpabardar Binolmollli	Panchi	
2019	Devil's Daughter	Dokhtar Shaitan	Ghorban Mohammadpour	

=== Hindi and Russian ===
Year	Hindi Title	Russian Title	Director(s)	Ref.
1957	Pardesi	Khozhdenie za tri morya	Khwaja Ahmad Abbas, Vasili Pronin	
1980	Alibaba Aur 40 Chor	Priklucheniya Ali-Baby i soroka razboynikov	Umesh Mehra, Latif Faiziyev	
1984	Sohni Mahiwal	Legenda o lyubvi	Umesh Mehra, Latif Faiziyev	
1991	Ajooba	Vozvrashcheniye Bagdadskogo Vora, Black Prince Ajuba	Shashi Kapoor, Gennadi Vasilyev	
1991	Shikari	Po zakonam dzhunglyey	Umesh Mehra, Latif Faizev	

=== Hindi and Tamil ===
Year	Hindi Title	Tamil Title	Director(s)	Notes	Ref.
1951	Sansar	Samsaram	S. S. Vasan		
1952	Rani	Rani	L. V. Prasad		
1969/70	Chanda Aur Bijli	Anadhai Anandhan	Atma Ram, Anadhai Anandhan		
1998/2000	Papa The Great	Vaettiya Madichu Kattu	K. Bhagyaraj		
2000	Hey Ram	Hey Ram	Kamal Haasan		
2001	Abhay	Aalavandhan	Suresh Krissna		
2004	Yuva	Aaytha Ezhuthu	Mani Ratnam		
2004/05	Gayab	Jithan	Prawaal Raman, Vincent Selva		
2005	Mumbai Xpress	Mumbai Xpress	Singeetam Srinivasa Rao		
2009	13B: Fear Has a New Address	Yavarum Nalam	Vikram Kumar		
2010	Raavan	Raavanan	Mani Ratnam		
2012	Tum Ho Yaara	Panithuli	Natty Kumar; Dr. Jay		
2013	Vishwaroop	Vishwaroopam	Kamal Haasan		
2016	Saala Khadoos	Irudhi Suttru	Sudha Kongara		
2017	The House Next Door	Aval	Milind Rau		
2018	Vishwaroop II	Vishwaroopam II	Kamal Haasan		
2018	X Videos	X Videos	Sajo Sundar	Hindi version unreleased	
2021	Thalaivii	Thalaivii	A. L. Vijay		
2024	Merry Christmas	Merry Christmas	Sriram Raghavan		
2024	Dange	Por	Bejoy Nambiar		

=== Hindi and Telugu ===
Year	Telugu Title	Hindi Title	Director(s)	Notes	Ref.
1950/1951	Mangala	Mangala	S. S. Vasan, Chandru		
1955/1956	Santosham	Naya Aadmi	C. P. Deekshith		
1978	Anugraham	Kondura	Shyam Benegal		
1986	Simhasanam	Singhasan	Krishna		
1992	Raatri	Raat	Ram Gopal Varma		
1992	Antham	Drohi	Ram Gopal Varma		
1994	Prema Sikharam	Anokha Premyudh	Satya		
1995	Criminal	Criminal	Mahesh Bhatt		
2000/2002	Suri	Durga	Sankara Kumar, J. D. Chakravarthy		
2003/2007	Aithe	50 Lakh	Chandra Sekhar Yeleti		
2008	Gautama Buddha	Tathagatha Buddha	Allani Sridhar		
2010	Rakta Charitra	Rakht Charitra	Ram Gopal Varma		
2010	Rakta Charitra 2	Rakht Charitra 2	Ram Gopal Varma		
2013	Thoofan	Zanjeer	Apoorva Lakhia		
2013	Satya 2	Satya 2	Ram Gopal Varma		
2017	Ghazi	Ghazi Attack	Sankalp Reddy		
2018	Aithe 2.0	Pirates 1.0	Raj Madiraju	Hindi version unreleased	
2019	Saaho	Saaho	Sujeeth		
2022	Radhe Shyam	Radhe Shyam	Radha Krishna Kumar		
2022	Major	Major	Sashi Kiran Tikka		
2022	Liger	Liger	Puri Jagannadh		
2023	Adipurush	Adipurush	Om Raut		
2024	Operation Valentine	Operation Valentine	Shakti Pratap Singh Hada		
2025	Jatadhara	Jatadhara	Venkat Kalyan; Abhishek Jaiswal		
2026	Dacoit: A Love Story	Dacoit: Ek Prem Katha	Shaneil Deo		

=== Hindi and Turkish ===
Year	Hindi Title	Turkish Title	Director(s)	Ref.
1956	Kismet	Kısmet	Nanabhai Bhatt, Semih Evin	

=== Kannada and English ===
Year	Kannada Title	English title	Director(s)	Notes	Ref.
1977	Chandamarutha	Wild Wind	Tikkavarapu Pattabhirama Reddy	Lost film	
2018	Summer Holidays	Summer Holidays	Kavitha Lankesh		
2026	Toxic	Toxic	Geethu Mohandas		

=== Kannada and Konkani ===
Year	Kannada Title	Konkani Title	Director(s)	Notes	Ref.
2023	The Vacant House	The Vacant House	Ester Noronha		

=== Kannada and Malayalam ===
Year	Kannada Title	Malayalam Title	Director(s)	Notes	Ref.
2012	Shikari	Shikari	Abhaya Simha		
2012	The Hitlist	The Hitlist	Bala	Kannada version unreleased	

=== Kannada and Marathi ===
Year	Kannada Title	Marathi Title	Director(s)	Notes	Ref.
2025/26	Operation London Cafe	After Operation London Cafe	Sadagara Raghavendra		
TBA	Rajasthan Diaries	Rajasthan Diaries	Nanditha Yadav	Both versions unreleased	

=== Kannada and Sanskrit ===
Year	Kannada Title	Sanskrit Title	Director(s)	Notes	Ref.
2022	Ekachara	Ekacharam	Suchendra Prasad	Only Sanskrit version released	

=== Kannada and Tamil ===
Year	Kannada Title	Tamil Title	Director(s)	Notes	Ref
1937	Purandaradasa	Bhakta Purandaradoss	B. Chawan		
1950	Shaneeshwara Mahathme	Raja Vikrama	Kemparaj Urs		
1954	Jaladurga	Karkottai	Kemparaj Urs		
1955	Modala Thedi	Mudhal Thethi	P. Neelakantan		
1957	Bhaktha Markandeya	Bhaktha Markandeya	B. S. Ranga		
1957	Rathnagiri Rahasya	Thangamalai Ragasiyam	B. R. Panthulu		
1957	Premada Putri	Anbe Deivam	R. Nagendra Rao		
1964	Chinnada Gombe	Muradan Muthu	B. R. Panthulu		
1975	Nireekshe	Thennangkeetru	Kovi Manisekaran		
1978	Thappida Thala	Thappu Thalangal	K. Balachander		
1978	Priya	Priya	S.P. Muthuraman		
1980	Makkala Sainya	Mazhalai Pattalam	Lakshmi		
1980	Maria My Darling	Maria My Darling	Durai		
1985/86	Ajeya	Pudir	S. Siddalingaiah		
1987	Premaloka	Paruva Ragam	V. Ravichandran		
1987	Agni Kanye	Neruppu Nila	T. Janardhan		
1992	Shambhavi	Devar Veettu Ponnu	Rama Narayanan		
1999	Jayasoorya	Maya	Rama Narayanan		
2000	Independence Day	Independence Day	A. R. Ramesh		
2003	Sri Kalikamba	Annai Kaligambal	Ramanarayanan		
2012	Chaarulatha	Chaarulatha	Pon Kumaran		
2013	Chandra	Chandra	Roopa Iyer		
2015	Octopus	Octopus	P. Annaiah	Tamil version unreleased	
2015/2016	Alone	Karaioram	JKS	Additional Telugu version unreleased	
2016	Game	Oru Melliya Kodu	A. M. R. Ramesh		
2016	Bheeshma	Kadhali Kanavillai	Raviraja	Tamil version unreleased	
2016	Kotigobba 2	Mudinja Ivana Pudi	K. S. Ravikumar		
2017	Vismaya	Nibunan	Arun Vaidyanathan		
2022	Dr. 56	Dr. 56	Rajesh Anandleela		

=== Kannada and Telugu ===
Year	Kannada Title	Telugu Title	Director(s)	Notes	Ref.
1956	Adarshasati	Nagula Chavithi	R. Nagendra Rao		
1957	Nala Damayanthi	Nala Damayanthi	Kemparaj Urs		
1958	Bhookailasa	Bhookailas	K. Shankar		
1960	Aasha Sundari	Rama Sundari	Hunsur Krishnamurthy		
1962	Gaali Gopura	Gaali Medalu	B. R. Panthulu		
1963	Saaku Magalu	Pempudu Koothuru	B. R. Panthulu		
1964	Amarashilpi Jakanachari	Amarasilpi Jakkanna	B. S. Ranga		
1979	I Love You	I Love You	Vayu Nandana Rao		
1981	Swapna	Swapna	Dasari Narayana Rao	Additional Tamil version unreleased	
1983	Ananda Bhairavi	Ananda Bhairavi	Jandhyala		
1990	Bannada Gejje	Prema Yuddham	Rajendra Singh Babu		
1999	A.K. 47	A.K. 47	Om Prakash Rao		
2004	Veera Kannadiga	Andhrawala	Meher Ramesh / Puri Jagannadh		
2004	Swetha Naagara	Swetha Naagu	Sanjeevi		
2015	Chandrika	Chandrika	Yogesh Munisiddhappa		
2016	Bullet Rani	Bullet Rani	Suresh Goswami		
2016	Jaguar	Jaguar	A. Mahadev		
2016	Idolle Ramayana	Mana Oori Ramayanam	Prakash Raj		
2017	Rogue	Rogue	Puri Jagannadh		
2018	Bhairava Geetha	Bhairava Geetha	Ram Gopal Varma		
2024	Lineman	Lineman	Raghu Shastry		
2025	Junior	Junior	Radha Krishna Reddy		
2025	Love OTP	Love OTP	Aniissh Tejeshwar		

=== Kannada and Tulu ===
Year	Kannada Title	Tulu Title	Director(s)	Notes	Ref.
2022	Rana	Rana	Praveen Raj		
2025	Jai	Jai	Roopesh Shetty		
2026	Veera Kambala	Birduda Kambula	S. V. Rajendra Singh Babu	Both versions unreleased	

=== Malayalam and Tamil ===
Year	Malayalam Title	Tamil Title	Director(s)	Notes	Ref.
1952	Amma	Amma	Jairus Paul		
1953	Genova	Genova	F. Nagoor		
1963	Kaattumaina	Kaattumaina	M. Krishnan Nair		
1973	Kaadu	Malai Naattu Mangai	P. Subramaniam		
1975	Swami Ayyappan	Swami Ayyappan	P. Subramaniam		
1979	Allauddinum Albhutha Vilakkum	Alavuthinum Arputha Vilakkum	I. V. Sasi		
1991	Ente Sooryaputhrikku	Karpoora Mullai	Fazil		
2000	The Salute	The Salute	Alagappan	Both versions unreleased	
2000	Raakilipattu	Snegithiye	Priyadarshan		
2010	Vandae Maatharam	Vandae Maatharam	T. Aravind		
2012	Gramam	Namma Gramam	Mohan Sharma		
2013	Neram	Neram	Alphonse Putharen		
2014	Samsaaram Aarogyathinu Haanikaram	Vaayai Moodi Pesavum	Balaji Mohan		
2014	Asha Black	Nee Naan Nizhal	Marc Robinson		
2016	Girls	Thiraikku Varaatha Kathai	Thulasidas		
2017	Solo	Solo	Bejoy Nambiar		
2018	Street Lights	Street Lights	Shamdat	Tamil version unreleased	
2018	Kinar	Keni	M. A. Nishad		
2021	Erida	Erida	V. K. Prakash		
2022	Last 6 Hours	Last 6 Hours	Sunish Kumar	Malayalam version unreleased	
2022	Ottu	Rendagam	Fellini T. P.		
2022	Adrishyam	Yugi	Zac Harriss		

=== Malayalam and Telugu ===
Year	Malayalam Title	Telugu Title	Director(s)	Ref.
1980	Love in Singapore	Love in Singapore	Baby, OSR Anjaneyulu	
2013	Ente	Naa Bangaaru Talli	Rajesh Touchriver	

=== Odia and Telugu ===
Year	Odia Title	Telugu Title	Director(s)	Notes	Ref.
2017/2021	Sita Ramanka Bahagara Kali Jugare	Seetha Ramula Kalyanam Chuthamu Raarandi	G.N.S. Prasad		
TBA	Patnagarh	Patnagarh	Rajesh Touchriver	Both versions unreleased	

=== Telugu and Tamil ===
Year	Telugu Title	Tamil Title	Director(s)	Notes	Ref.
1950	Naa Illu	En Veedu	V. Nagayya		
1950	Beedala Patlu	Ezhai Padum Padu	K. Ramnoth		
1951	Tilottama	Mayamalai	Raja Saheb of Mirzapur		
1951	Pathala Bhairavi	Pathala Bhairavi	K. V. Reddy		
1951	Mayalamari	Maayakkari	P. Sridhar		
1951	Nirdoshi	Niraparadhi	H. M. Reddy		
1952	Pelli Chesi Choodu	Kalyanam Panni Paaru	L. V. Prasad		
1952	Prema	Kaadhal	P. S. Ramakrishna Rao		
1952	Mugguru Kodukulu	Moondru Pillaigal	R. Nagendra Rao		
1953	Ammalakkalu	Marumagal	D. Yoganand		
1953	Kanna Talli	Petra Thai	K. S. Prakash Rao		
1953	Devadasu	Devadas	Vedantham Raghavaiah		
1953	Paradesi	Poongothai	L. V. Prasad		
1954	Manohara	Manohara	L. V. Prasad		
1955	Missamma	Missiamma	L. V. Prasad		
1956	Charana Daasi	Mathar Kula Manickam	T. Prakash Rao		
1956	Bhale Ramudu	Prema Pasam	Vedantham Raghavaiah		
1956	Tenali Ramakrishna	Tenali Raman	B. S. Ranga		
1957	Thodi Kodallu	Engal Veettu Mahalakshmi	Adurthi Subba Rao		
1957	Mayabazar	Mayabazar	K. V. Reddy		
1957	Varudu Kavali	Manamagan Thevai	P. S. Ramakrishna Rao		
1957	Suvarna Sundari	Manaalane Mangaiyin Baakkiyam	Vedantham Raghavaiah		
1958	Bhooloka Rambha	Bhooloka Rambai	D. Yoganand		
1958	Chenchu Lakshmi	Chenchu Lakshmi	B. A. Subba Rao		
1958	Dongalunnaru Jagratha	Thirudargal Jakkirathai	B. Narasimha Rao		
1958/59	Pellinaati Pramanalu	Vaazhkai Oppandham	K. V. Reddy		
1959	Mangalya Balam	Manjal Mahimai	Adurthi Subba Rao		
1959	Raja Malaya Simha	Raja Malaya Simhan	B. S. Ranga		
1960	Nammina Bantu	Pattaliyin Vetri	Adurthi Subba Rao		
1960	Raja Makutam	Raja Makutam	B. N. Reddy		
1960	Devanthakudu	Naan Kanda Sorgam	Pullaiah		
1961	Batasari	Kaanal Neer	P. S. Ramakrishna Rao		
1961	Intiki Deepam Illale	Manapanthal	V. N. Reddy		
1962	Gundamma Katha	Manithan Maravillai	Aluri Cakrapani		
1962	Aasa Jeevulu	Thendral Veesum	B. S. Ranga		
1963	Lava Kusa	Lava Kusa	C. Pullaiah, C. S. Rao		
1965	Veerabhimanyu	Veera Abhimanyu	V. Madhusudhan Rao		
1978	Vayasu Pilichindi	Ilamai Oonjal Aadukirathu	C. V. Sridhar		
1979	Guppedu Manasu	Nool Veli	K. Balachander		
1979	Amma Evarikkaina Amma	Annai Oru Aalayam	R. Thyagarajan		
1979	Andamaina Anubhavam	Ninaithale Inikkum	K. Balachander		
1980	Guru	Guru	I. V. Sasi		
1980	Kaali	Kaali	I. V. Sasi		
1980	Mayadari Krishnudu	Anbukku Naan Adimai	R. Thyagarajan		
1980	Aakali Rajyam	Varumayin Niram Sivappu	K. Balachander		
1981	Tholi Kodi Koosindi	Enga Ooru Kannagi	K. Balachander		
1981	47 Rojulu	47 Natkal	K. Balachander		
1981	Seethakoka Chilaka	Alaigal Oivathillai	Bharathiraja		
1981	Andagaadu	Sankarlal	T. N. Balu		
1981	Amavasya Chandrudu	Raja Paarvai	Singeetam Srinivasa Rao		
1981	Kaala Rathri	Oru Iravu Oru Paravai	P. C. Reddy		
1982	Edi Dharmam Edi Nyayam	Neethi Devan Mayakkam	Bapu		
1986	Neti Savithri	Meendum Savithri	Visu		
1987	Chinnari Devata	Shankar Guru	Raja Naidu		
1993	Asadhyuralu	Periyamma	P. Bhanumathi		
1994	Samaram	Athiradi Padai	R. K. Selvamani		
1994	Khaidi No. 1	Hero	A. Jagannathan		
1995	Drohi	Kuruthipunal	P. C. Sreeram		
2000	Durga	Pottu Amman	R. K. Selvamani, K. Rajarathinam		
2003	Vasantam	Priyamaana Thozhi	Vikraman		
2003	Nee Manasu Naaku Telusu	Enakku 20 Unakku 18	Jyothi Krishna		
2004	Naani	New	S. J. Surya		
2004	7G Brindavan Colony	7G Rainbow Colony	Selvaraghavan		
2005	Guru	Gurudeva	B Jaffer		
2006	Neeku Naaku	Oru Kadhalan Oru Kadhali	Selvendran		
2008	Kathanayakudu	Kuselan	P. Vasu		
2008	Ninna Nedu Repu	Netru Indru Naalai	Lakshmikanth Chenna		
2008	Salute	Satyam	A. Rajasekhar		
2009	Pistha	Thoranai	Saba Iyappan		
2009	Eenadu	Unnaipol Oruvan	Chakri Toleti		
2010	Ye Maaya Chesave	Vinnaithaandi Varuvaayaa	Gautham Vasudev Menon		
2010	Siddhu +2	Love In Hyderabad	K. Bhagyaraj, Chandra Mahesh	Telugu version unreleased	
2011	Gaganam	Payanam	Radha Mohan		
2011	Koffi Bar	Nimidangal	Geetha Krishna		
2011	180	Nootrenbadhu	Jayendra Panchapakesan		
2011	Keratam	Yuvan	Gautham Patnaik / R.N.Saran		
2012	Dhoni	Dhoni	Prakash Raj		
2012	Eega	Naan Ee	S. S. Rajamouli		
2012	Yeto Vellipoyindhi Manasu	Neethaane En Ponvasantham	Gautham Menon		
2012	Nanda Nanditha	Nanda Nanditha	Ram Shiva		
2012	Endukante... Premanta!	Yen Endral Kadhal Enben!	A. Karunakaran	Tamil version unreleased	
2013	Gouravam	Gouravam	Radha Mohan		
2013	Action 3D	Aasu Raja Rani Jackie Matrum Joker	Anil Sunkara	Tamil version unreleased	
2013/14	Dalam	Koottam	Jeevan		
2014	Anaamika	Nee Enge En Anbe	Sekhar Kammula		
2014/15	Janda Pai Kapiraju	Nimirndhu Nil	Samuthirakani		
2014/16	Ghatana	Malini 22 Palayamkottai	Sripriya		
2015	Malupu	Yagavarayinum Naa Kaakka	Sathya Prabhas Pinisetty		
2015	Moodu Mukkallo Cheppalante	Moone Moonu Varthai	Madhumitha		
2015	Baahubali: The Beginning	Baahubali: The Beginning	S. S. Rajamouli		
2015	Courier Boy Kalyan	Tamilselvanum Thaniyar Anjalum	Premsai		
2015	Cheekati Rajyam	Thoongaa Vanam	Rajesh Selva		
2015	Size Zero	Inji Iduppazhagi	Prakash Kovelamudi		
2015/17	Kaki	Ka Ka Ka: Aabathin Arikuri	Manon M		
2016	Sahasam Swasaga Sagipo	Achcham Enbadhu Madamaiyada	Gautham Menon		
2016	Oopiri	Thozha	Vamsi Paidipally		
2016	Nayaki	Nayagi	Goverdhan Reddy		
2017	Spyder	Spyder	AR Murugadoss		
2017	C/o Surya	Nenjil Thunivirundhal	Suseenthiran		
2018	U Turn	U Turn	Pawan Kumar		
2018	Bhaagamathie	Bhaagamathie	G. Ashok		
2018	Kanam	Diya	A. L. Vijay		
2019	Abhinetri 2	Devi 2	A. L. Vijay		
2019	7	7	Nizar Shafi		
2019	Game Over	Game Over	Ashwin Saravanan		
2019	Ninu Veedani Needanu Nene	Kannaadi	Caarthik Raju	Tamil version unreleased	
2020	College Kumar	College Kumar	Hari Santhosh		
2021	Kapatadhaari	Kabadadaari	Pradeep Krishnamoorty		
2022	1945	1945	Sathyasiva		
2022	Clap	Clap	Prithvi Adithya		
2022	The Warriorr	The Warriorr	N. Linguswamy		
2022	Oke Oka Jeevitham	Kanam	Shree Karthick		
2023	Sir	Vaathi	Venky Atluri		
2023	Custody	Custody	Venkat Prabhu		
2023	Boo	Boo	A. L. Vijay		
2023	Nene Naa	Soorpanagai	Caarthick Raju	Tamil version unreleased	
2023/24	Ala Ila Ela	Oru Thee	Raghava Dwarki		
2024	Chiclets	Chiclets	Muthu M.		
2025	Kaliyugam 2064	Kaliyugam	Pramodh Sundar		
2025	Eleven	Eleven	Lokkesh Ajls		
2025	Kuberaa	Kuberaa	Sekhar Kammula		
2025	Unpaarvaiyil	Divya Drushti	Kabir Lal		

== Trilingual films ==
Year	Languages	Titles	Director(s)	Notes	Ref
1949	Tamil, Hindi, Telugu	Apoorva Sagodharargal (Tamil), Nishan (Hindi), Apoorva Sahodarulu (Telugu)	Acharya (Tamil), C. Pullayya (Telugu), S. S. Vasan (Hindi)		
1952	Tamil, Telugu, Malayalam	Kanchana	S. M. Sriramulu Naidu		
1953	Tamil, Telugu, Hindi	Chandirani	Bhanumathi Ramakrishna		
1953	Tamil, Kannada, Telugu	Jatakam (Tamil), Jataka Phala (Kannada), Jatakaphalam (Telugu)	R. Nagendra Rao		
1953/54	Hindi, Tamil, Telugu	Ladki (Hindi), Penn (Tamil), Sangham (Telugu)	M. V. Raman		
1957	Telugu, Tamil, Hindi	Allauddin Adhbhuta Deepam (Telugu), Allavudeenum Arputha Vilakkum (Tamil), Alladdin Ka Chirag (Hindi)	T. R. Raghunath		
1960	Telugu, Tamil, Kannada	Pillalu Techina Challani Rajyam (Telugu), Kuzhandhaigal Kanda Kudiyarasu / Makkala Rajya	B. R. Panthulu		
1960	Tamil, Telugu, Kannada	Bhaktha Sabari (Tamil/Telugu) / Bhakte Shabari (Kannada)	Chitrapu Narayana Rao		
1975	Tamil, Telugu, Hindi	Ellorum Nallavare (Tamil), Andaru Manchivare (Telugu), Ek Gaon Ki Kahani (Hindi)	S. S. Balan		
1979	Tamil, Kannada, Telugu	Azhage Unnai Aarathikkiren (Tamil), Urvasi Neene Nanna Preyasi (Kannada), Urvasi Neeve Naa Preyasi (Telugu)	C. V. Sridhar		
1981	Kannada, Tamil, Malayalam	Garjane (Kannada), Garjanai (Tamil), Garjanam (Malayalam)	C. V. Rajendran		
2001	Tamil, Hindi, English	Little John	Singeetam Srinivasa Rao		
2009/2012	Kannada, Malayalam, Tamil	Ajantha	Rajappa Ravishankar	Additional Telugu version unreleased	
2010	Tamil, Kannada, Telugu	Kutti Pisasu (Tamil), Bombat Car (Kannada), Cara Majaka (Telugu)	Rama Narayanan		
2012	Kannada, Tamil, Malayalam	Challenge (Kannada), Yaarukku Theriyum (Tamil), 120 Minutes (Malayalam)	G. Kamaraj		
2014	Tamil, Telugu, Kannada	Jai Hind 2 (Tamil, Telugu), Abhimanyu (Kannada)	Arjun Sarja		
2014	Tamil, Kannada, Telugu	Un Samayal Arayil (Tamil), Oggarane (Kannada), Ulavacharu Biryani (Telugu)	Prakash Raj		
2015	Kannada, Telugu, Malayalam	Red Alert (Kannada/Telugu), High Alert (Malayalam)	Chandra Mahesh	Additional Tamil version unreleased	
2016	Tamil, Telugu, Hindi	Devi (Tamil), Abhinetri (Telugu), Tutak Tutak Tutiya (Hindi)	A. L. Vijay		
2016	Malayalam, Hindi, English	Veeram	Jayaraj		
2021	Tamil, Telugu, Hindi	Kaadan (Tamil), Aranya (Telugu), Haathi Mere Saathi (Hindi)	Prabhu Solomon		

== Quadrilingual films ==
Year	Languages	Titles	Director(s)	Notes	Ref.
1991	Kannada, Tamil, Telugu, Hindi	Shanti Kranti (Kannada, Telugu, Hindi), Nattukku Oru Nallavan (Tamil)	V. Ravichandran		
2017	Kannada, Telugu, Tamil, Malayalam	Butterfly (Kannada), That Is Mahalakshmi (Telugu), Paris Paris (Tamil), Zam Zam (Malayalam)	Ramesh Aravind (Kannada, Tamil), Prasanth Varma (Telugu), G. Neelakanta Reddy (Malayalam)	All versions unreleased	
2019	Malayalam, Hindi, Kannada, Telugu	Praana	V. K. Prakash	Only Malayalam version released	
2025	Hindi, Kannada, Tamil, Telugu	Mahavatar Narsimha	Ashwin Kumar	AI used for lip sync in multiple languages	

== Films containing dialogues in multiple languages ==
- Note: the most prominent language is listed first. Only significant usages are listed below.

Year	Languages	Title	Director(s)	Ref.
1931	Tamil, Telugu, Hindi	Kalidas	HM Reddy	
1974	Hindi, English, Persian	International Crook (Kala Bazaar)	Panchi	
1981	Tamil, Hindi	Nandu	Mahendran	
1995	Tamil, Hindi	Bombay	Mani Ratnam	
1998	Hindi, English	Swami Vivekananda	G. V. Iyer	
1999	Kannada/Telugu, Hindi (Note: Hindi is featured in both versions.)	A. K. 47	Om Prakash Rao	
2000	Hindi, English	Mumbai Matinee	Anant Balani	
2000	Telugu, English	Dollar Dreams	Sekhar Kammula	
2001	Hindi, English	Monsoon Wedding	Mira Nair	
2002	English, Hindi	Bollywood/Hollywood	Deepa Mehta	
2002	Kannada, Tamil	H2O	Lokanath Rajaram	
2003	Hindi, English	Jhankaar Beats	Sujoy Ghosh	
2004	Hindi, English	Let's Enjoy	Siddharth Anand Kumar, Ankur Tewari	
2006	Telugu, English	Indian Beauty / On the Other Side	Shanti Kumar	
2006	Bengali, English	The Bong Connection	Anjan Dutt	
2007	Kannada, English	SMS 6260	Sundeep Malani	
2007	Hindi, Ladakhi	Frozen	Shivajee Chandrabhushan	
2007	English, Malayalam	Before the Rains	Santosh Sivan	
2009	Tamil, English	Achchamundu! Achchamundu!	Arun Vaidyanathan	
2010	Malayalam, Tamil	Anwar	Amal Neerad	
2011	Hindi, English	Delhi Belly	Abhinay Deo	
2013	Hindi, Odia	Oonga	Devashish Makhija	
2014	English, Hindi	Unfreedom	Raj Amit Kumar	
2016	Tamil, English	Lens	Jayaprakash Radhakrishnan	
2016	Persian, English, Hindi	Salaam Mumbai	Ghorban Mohammadpour	
2016	Hindi, English	CRD	Kranti Kanade	
2016	English, Hindi	Mantra	Nicholas Kharkongor	
2017	Bengali, English	The Bongs Again	Anjan Dutt	
2017	Konkani, Tulu	Ashem Zalem Kashem	Maxim Pereira	
2017	Malayalam, Tamil	Ma Chu Ka	Jayan Vannery	
2017	Marathi, Hindi, English	Sachin: A Billion Dreams	James Erskine	
2017	English, Hindi, Assamese, Bengali, Meitei, Nagamese	III Smoking Barrels	Sanjib Dey	
2017	Hindi, English	Shreelancer	Sandeep Mohan	
2018	English, Hindi	Amoli	Jasmine Kaur Roy, Avinash Roy	
2018	Hindi, English, Konkani, Punjabi	Welcome M1LL10NS	Milroy Goes	
2019	English, Hindi	CandyFlip	Shanawaz NK	
2019	Malayalam, Hindi	Moothon	Geetu Mohandas	
2019	Malayalam, Tamil	Love Action Drama	Dhyan Sreenivasan	
2019	Hindi, English	Line of Descent	Rohit Karn Batra	
2020	Malayalam, Tamil	Cochin Shadhi at Chennai 03	Manjith Diwakar	
2020	Telugu, English	Nishabdham	Hemant Madhukar	
2021	Hindi, English, Marathi	Tribhanga	Renuka Shahane	
2021	Hindi, Urdu	Lahore Confidential	Kunal Kohli	
2021	Hindi, English	Love in the Times of Corona	Indrani Ray	
2021	Tamil, Malayalam	Kadaseela Biriyani	Nishanth Kalidindi	
2022	Tamil, Hindi, English (Note: The Tamil and English versions both don't feature Hindi while the Hindi version does.)	Rocketry: The Nambi Effect	R. Madhavan	
2022	English, Hindi, Marathi, Tamil, Malayalam, Telugu, Kannada	Wonder Women	Anjali Menon	
2023	Malayalam, Tamil	Nanpakal Nerathu Mayakkam	Lijo Jose Pellissery	
2023	Malayalam, Arabic	Ayisha	Aamir Pallikkal	
2023	Tamil, Hindi	Ayothi	R. Manthira Moorthy	
2023	Malayalam, Tamil	Rajni / Aval Peyar Rajni	Vinil Scariah Varghese	
2023	English, Hindi	Dilli Dark	Dibakar Das Roy	
2024	Malayalam, Tamil	Manjummel Boys	Chidambaram	
2024	Hindi, Tamil	The Silent Prayer	Senthil Vinu	
2024	Malayalam, Tamil	Virunnu / Virundhu	Kannan Thamarakkulam	
2024	Tamil, Malayalam	Alangu	S. P. Sakthivel	
2024	Hindi, Malayalam, Marathi	All We Imagine as Light	Payal Kapadia	
2024	Assamese, Baganiya, English, Hindi	Sikaar	Debankar Borgohain	
2024	Hindi, Malayalam	Love, Sitara	Vandana Kataria	
2025	Malayalam, Hindi, English	L2: Empuraan	Prithviraj Sukumaran	
2025	Kannada, Tamil, English, Telugu	Elumale	Punit Rangaswamy	
2025	Malayalam, Kannada, Tamil	Lokah Chapter 1: Chandra	Dominic Arun	
2025	Malayalam, Tamil	Mirage	Jeethu Joseph	
2025	Malayalam, Tamil	Balti	Unni Sivalingam	
2025	Malayalam, Tamil	Kalamkaval	Jithin K. Jose	
2026	Tamil, Korean, English	Made in Korea	Ra. Karthik	
2026	Malayalam, Tamil	Ananthan Kaadu	Jiyen Krishnakumar	

== Partially reshot films ==
=== Different release dates ===
- Note: this film features a list of films first fully shot in one language before being partially reshot in another usually with the original version releasing before the reshot version.

Year	Films	Director(s)	Language	Reshot as	Notes	Ref.
1945	Meera	Ellis R. Dungan	Tamil	Meera (Hindi, 1947)	Few scenes reshot	
1951	Pathala Bhairavi	K. V. Reddy	Telugu, Tamil	Pathala Bhairavi (Hindi)	Vasan reshot two song sequences in colour	
1967	Bhakta Prahalada	Chitrapu Narayana Murthy	Telugu	Bhaktha Prahalad (Tamil, Hindi)	Tamil version had T. S. Balaiah and A. Karunanidhi enacting the role of Prahlad's mentors and Rajendra Nath and Dhumal portrayed the same roles in its Hindi version	
1974	Vayanadan Thampan	A. Vincent	Malayalam	Pyasa Shaitan (Hindi)	Hindi version directed by Joginder; additional footage reshot	
1977	Aadu Puli Attam	S. P. Muthuraman	Tamil	Yetthuku Pai Yetthu (Telugu)	Additional scenes with Satyanarayana and Allu Ramalingaiah	
1977	Kumkuma Rakshe	S. K. A. Chari	Kannada	Kurinji Malar (Tamil)	Additional scenes with Suruli Rajan and Malini	
1978	Madanolsavam	N. Shankaran Nair	Malayalam	Amara Prema (Telugu)	Telugu version directed by T. Rama Rao; some of scenes were reshot, Kaikala Satyanarayana replaces Thikkurissy Sukumaran Nair; Additional scenes with Rama Prabha, Raja Babu, and Chaya Devi	
1981	Ullasa Paravaigal	C. V. Rajendran	Tamil	Prema Pichchi (Telugu)	Re-shot scenes with Telugu actors like Mohan Babu	
1981	Hennina Sedu	A. M. Samiulla	Kannada	Chalaki Chellamma (Telugu)	Murali Mohan replaces Srinath	
1984	Dhavani Kanavugal	K. Bhagyaraj	Tamil	Ammayiloo.. Preminchandi! (Telugu)	Some scenes were reshot on Dubbing Janaki and Padmanabham	
1984	My Dear Kuttichathan	Jijo	Malayalam	Chhota Chetan (Hindi, 1998); Chutti Chathan (Tamil, 2010)	Scenes involving Urmila Matondkar and other Hindi actors shot for 1998 version; Additional scenes involving Santhanam and Prakash Raj shot for 2010 version	
1984	Jada Gantalu	KS Ram	Telugu	Ippadithan Irukkavendum Pombala (Tamil)	Additional scenes with Senthil, S. S. Chandran, and Kovai Sarala	
1985	Anveshana	Vamsy	Telugu	Paadum Paravaigal (Tamil)	Additional comedy track with Goundamani and Senthil	
1987	Veendum Lisa	Baby	Malayalam	My Dear Lisa (Tamil)	Reshot scenes to suit nativity	
1991	Ajay Vijay	A. T. Raghu	Kannada	Pudhiya Natchathiram (Tamil)	Additional comedy track with Senthil and Master Haja Sheriff	
1991	Krama	Asrar Abid	Kannada	Mangalyam (Tamil)	Additional comedy track with Senthil and Kumarimuthu	
1992	Priyathama	Geetha Krishna	Telugu	Vasanthame (Tamil)	Additional scenes reshot on Kovai Sarala and Loose Mohan	
1992	Chembaruthi	R. K. Selvamani	Tamil	Chamanti (Telugu)	Kaikala Satyanarayana replaces M. N. Nambiar	
1992	Rowdy Inspector	B. Gopal	Telugu	Auto Rani (Tamil)	Reshot comedy track of Senthil	
1993	Aagraham	K. S. Ravi	Telugu	Evana Irundha Enakenna (Tamil)	Two reshot scenes featuring Vennira Aadai Moorthy	
1993	Mathru Devo Bhava	Ajay Kumar	Telugu	Thaai Ullam (Tamil)	Reshot scenes featuring Vadivelu, Kovai Sarala and Venniradai Moorthy	
1993	Chirunavvula Varamistava	N. H. Chandra	Telugu	Vicky (Tamil, 2002)	Additional song with Raju Sundaram and Ramya Krishnan; Song "Yentabagundi Basu" from Chala Bagundi reused in Tamil version	
1993	Manikantana Mahime	K. Shankar	Kannada	Sabarimalayil Thanga Suryodayam (Malayalam, 1993)	Additional scenes with Madhu and Shanthi Krishna	
1994	Captain	Kodi Ramakrishna	Telugu	Captain (Tamil)	Reshot scenes involving R. Sarathkumar, Sukanya, Raghuvaran, and Devan and the songs "Kannatthula Vai" and "Iduppu Adikkadi Pudikkidhu" to suit nativity	
1995	Aadaalla Majaka	Muthyala Subbaiah	Telugu	Marri (Tamil)	Some scenes were re-shot on Ramya Krishnan and Simran	
1996	Karpoorada Gombe	S. Mahendar	Kannada	Akka (Tamil)	Added comedy track with Vadivelu and Chinni Jayanth	
1996	Aayudha	Ayyappa P. Sharma	Kannada	Thilagavathi CBI (Tamil)	Additional comedy track with Vadivelu and Kumaresan	
1997	Minsara Kanavu	Rajiv Menon	Tamil	Sapnay (Hindi)	"Poo Pookkum Osai" reshot as "Aawara Bhawren Jo Hole Hole Gaaye". Additional song "Teri Meri Baat Ho Kaise" reshot.	
1997	Taraka Ramudu	R. V. Udayakumar	Telugu	Velli Nilave (Tamil)	Manivannan replaces Kota Srinivasa Rao, Senthil replaces Babu Mohan	
1998	Angaaray	Mahesh Bhatt	Hindi	Rowdy (Telugu)	In the original version, Akshay Kumar kills Gulshan Grover, in the Telugu version, it has been changed that he is killed by Nagarjuna using computer graphics, reshot comedy track featuring Brahmanandam and Ali.	
1998	Antahpuram	Krishna Vamsi	Telugu	Anthapuram (Tamil)	Parthiban replaces Jagapathi Babu, Simran replaces Heera Rajagopal, additional scenes with Mansoor Ali Khan	
1998	Harikrishnans	Fazil	Malayalam	Harikrishnans (Tamil)	Extra scenes with Usharani, other actors in Tamil version	
1998	Subhavartha	P. N. Ramachandra Rao	Telugu	Mannavaru Chinnavaru (Tamil, 1999)	Sivaji Ganesan replaces Kota Srinivasa Rao, Maheswari replaces Kavya, Visu replaces Chandra Mohan, K. R. Vijaya replaces Siva Parvathi	
1999	Suriya Paarvai	Jagan	Tamil	Hello Friend (Telugu)	Sudhakar replaces Goundamani, Babu Mohan replaces Senthil, Ashok Kumar replaces Chinni Jayanth additional scenes with Gautham Raju and Chitti Babu	
1999	Rajasthan	R. K. Selvamani	Tamil	Rajasthan (Telugu)	Brahmanandam replaces Manivannan, Ali replaces Vadivelu, additional scenes with Chitti Babu and Visweswara Rao	
1999	Kadhalar Dhinam	Kathir	Tamil	Dil Hi Dil Mein (Hindi, 2000)	Anupam Kher replaces Nassar, Johnny Lever replaces Goundamani, Raju Shreshta replaces Chinni Jayanth, Additional songs reshot with Kunal, Sonali Bedre, and Nassar. Scenes shot at the same time as filming of Tamil version.	
1999	Red Indians	Sunil	Malayalam	Thilak (Tamil, 2004)	Added two new songs with one featuring Sathyaraj and Rambha and another one featuring Adithyan and Dhadi Balaji and comedy track with Vivek.	
1999	Mysterious Girl	Unknown	English, Hindi	Jodi No. 1 (Telugu, 2003)	Telugu version directed by Pratani Ramakrishna Goud; Additional scenes shot with Kaushal, Venya, Rajitha, and Pratani Ramakrishna Goud, Shot songs with music by Vandemataram Srinivas, Additional comedy sequence with Gautam Raju, Gundu Hanumatha Rao, and Siva Reddy	
2000	Chitram	Teja	Telugu	Chithiram (Tamil, 2001)	Reshot scenes with Manivannan, Senthil, Charle, Manorama and Kalpana	
2000	Aatank Hi Aatank	Dilip Shankar	Hindi	Aandavan (Tamil)	Additional footage involving Ponvannan and Vadivukkarasi	
2000	Nagulamma	K. S. R. Das	Telugu	Nagathamman (Tamil)	Additional comedy track of Charle and Vennira Aadai Moorthy	
2000	Bharata Ratna	Kodi Ramakrishna	Telugu	Bharatha Rathna (Tamil)	Additional comedy track of Senthil and Pandu	
2000	9 Nelalu	Kranthi Kumar	Telugu	Kanden Seethaiyai (Tamil)	Additional comedy track of Vivek and Mayilsamy	
2001	Priyamaina Neeku	Balashekaran	Telugu	Kadhal Sugamanathu (Tamil, 2003)	Pyramid Natarajan replaces Tanikella Bharani, Livingston replaces Ali	
2001	Aunty Preethse	H. Vasu	Kannada	Super Aunty (Tamil)	Vadivelu replaces Tennis Krishna, Vennira Aadai Moorthy replaces Bank Janardhan	
2001	Sri Manjunatha	K. Raghavendra Rao	Kannada	Sri Manjunatha (Telugu)	Reshot scenes with Chiranjeevi and Meena, Tanikella Bharani replaces Dwarakish, Brahmanandam replaces Mimicry Dayanand	
2001	Sri Raja Rajeshwari	Bharathi Kannan	Tamil	Sri Raja Rajeshwari (Telugu)	Babu Mohan replaces Vadivelu, Brahmanandam replaces police character, Gundu Hanumantha Rao replaces Bonda Mani; Ananth Babu replaces Benjamin	
2002	Thandavam	Shaji Kailas	Malayalam	Aerumugam (Tamil)	Additional comedy track featuring Pandiarajan and Paravai Muniyamma	
2002	Run	N. Linguswamy	Tamil	Run (Telugu)	Reshot scenes with Telugu actors; Sunil replaces Vivek	
2002	Kadhal Azhivathillai	Vijaya T. Rajendar	Tamil	Kurradochchaadu (Telugu)	Sudhakar and A. V. S. replace Dhamu and Vennira Aadai Moorthy	
2002	Malayali Mamanu Vanakkam	Rajasenan	Malayalam	Gounder Veettu Mappillai (Tamil)	Additional comedy track of Vadivelu, MS Bhaskar, Vennira Aadai Moorthy	
2002	Itha Oru Snehagatha	Captain Raju	Malayalam	Thrill (Tamil)	Additional comedy track of Livingston, Kadhal Sukumar, Manivannan	
2002	Sri Bannari Amman	Bharathi Kannan	Tamil	Mahachandi (Telugu)	Ali and Sudhakar replace Vadivelu	
2002	Devan	Arun Pandian	Tamil	Mass (Telugu)	Srihari replaces Karthik (scene involves Kota Srinivasa Rao)	
2002	Thotti Gang	E. V. V. Satyanarayana	Telugu	Love Game (Tamil)	Additional comedy track of Livingston, Vennira Aadai Moorthy, and Kumarimuthu	
2003	Vijayadasami	Bharathi Kannan	Kannada	Thaaye Bhuvaneswari (Tamil)	Charle replaces Karibasavaiah; additional scenes with Bharathi Kannan, Muthukaalai, Nellai Siva, Kullamani, and Sumathi	
2003	Okariki Okaru	Rasool Ellore	Telugu	Unnai Paartha Naal Mudhal (Tamil)	Additional comedy track of Ramesh Khanna	
2004	Kamaraj	A. Balakrishnan	Tamil	Kamaraj (Tamil, 2015)	Added scenes with Samuthirakani in re-released version	
2004	Jai	Teja	Telugu	Jairam (Tamil)	Pandiarajan replaces Venu Madhav; Additional scenes with Chinni Jayanth, Madhan Bob, Chitti Babu, and Vennira Aadai Moorthy	
2004	Seenu C/O Anu	Madhu	Telugu	Ippadikku Kadhaludan Seenu (Tamil)	Added comedy track of K. R. Vatsala, Aarthi, Muthukaalai, T. P. Gajendran and Kadhal Sukumar	
2004	Monalisa	Indrajit Lankesh	Kannada	Monalisa (Telugu)	Brahmanandam replaces Hari, Kovai Sarala replaces nurse character	
2004	Puttintiki Ra Chelli	Kodi Ramakrishna	Telugu	Anbu Sagotharan (Tamil)	Added comedy track of Senthil, Manivannan, Shakila	
2004	Kuch To Gadbad Hai	Suresh Bafna	Hindi	Mogudu Pellala Dongata (Telugu, 2005)	Added comedy track of Gautham Raju, K. K. Sharma, Abhi, Ironleg Sastri	
2004	Mani	Yogaraj Bhat	Kannada	Sollattuma (Tamil)	Added scene with Pandiarajan and Muthukaalai	
2005	Hai	KR Ramdas	Malayalam	Unakkaga (Tamil)	Scenes with Kumarimuthu, Charle and Chinni Jayanth	
2005	Ponniyin Selvan	Radha Mohan	Tamil	Muddula Koduku (Telugu)	Venu Madhav replaces Mayilsamy, Uttej replaces Elango Kumaravel	
2005	Amrithadhare	Nagathihalli Chandrashekhar	Kannada	Amrutha Varsham (Telugu)	Scenes with Jayasudha, Nasser, Dharamavarapu Subrahmanyam and Sunil	
2006	Keerthi Chakra	Major Ravi	Malayalam	Aran (Tamil)	Additional footage of Jiiva and Prakash Raj, additional comedy track of Ganja Karuppu, Ramesh Khanna, Cochin Haneefa	
2006	Madrasi	Arjun	Tamil	Sivakasi (Telugu)	Sunil replaces Vivek, M. S. Narayana replaces Vennira Aadai Moorthy	
2006	Seethakoka Chiluka	A. R. Raviraja	Telugu	Ilavattam (Tamil)	Re-shot scenes with M. S. Bhaskar, Manobala, and Kadhal Sukumar	
2006	Sainikudu	Gunasekhar	Telugu	Kumaran (Tamil)	Additional scenes with Vadivelu, Vennira Aadai Moorthy, Singamuthu and Omakuchi Narasimhan.	
2007	Subhadram	Sreelal Devaraj	Malayalam	Androru Naal (Tamil, 2010)	Additional scenes with Senthil and Bharathi Kannan	
2007	Albhuthadweep	Vinayan	Malayalam	Arputha Theevu (Tamil)	Manivannan replaces Jagathy Sreekumar, Additional scenes with Karunas, Vaiyapuri, Malavika and Thavakalai Chittibabu	
2007	Bangaru Konda	Kolanag	Telugu	Vairam (Tamil)	Kadhal Sukumar replaces Jeeva	
2007	Avan Chandiyude Makan	Thulasidas	Malayalam	Kaidhi (Tamil)	Reshot scenes with R. Sundarrajan, Vennira Aadai Moorthy, and Muthukaalai	
2008	Theekuchi	A. L. Raja	Tamil	Aggi Rava (Telugu, 2014)	Additional scenes with Brahmanandam, Vinutha Lal, Gundu Sudarshan, and Rocket Raghava	
2008	Gamyam	Krish Jagarlamudi	Telugu	Kadhalna Summa Illai (Tamil)	Reshot scenes with Ravi Krishna (who replaced Allari Naresh), Nassar, Ganja Karuppu, Ilavarasu and M. S. Bhaskar (who replaced Brahmanandam)	
2008	Vinayakudu	Sai Kiran Adivi	Telugu	Vinayaga (Tamil, 2012)	Tamil version directed by Balasekaran; Additional scenes with Krishnudu, Santhanam, Satya Krishnan and Cool Suresh	
2008	Gorintaku	V. R. Pratap	Telugu	Marudhani (Tamil)	Additional comedy track involving Mayilsamy	
2008	Inba	S. T. Vendhan	Tamil	Neelo Naalo (Telugu)	Telugu version directed by Nandu; Reshot comedy track with Sunil and Junior Relangi	
2008	Nayagan	Saravana Sakthi	Tamil	Ankusam (Telugu)	Reshot scenes with Jayaprakash Reddy, Telangana Shakuntala, Rallapalli, Uttej, and Tirupathi Prakash	
2008	Abhiyum Naanum	Radha Mohan	Tamil	Aakasamantha (Telugu)	Jagapati Babu replaces Prithviraj	
2008	Final Cut of Director (2016)	Bharathiraja	Hindi	Bommalattam (Tamil)	Manivannan replaces Mushtaq Khan, scenes with Arjun, Rukmini Vijayakumar, Kajal Aggarwal, Ranjitha, Vivek, Manivannan and Chitra Lakshmanan reshot (few scenes were reshot involved Nana Patekar, Niyamat Khan, and Vatsal Sheth)	
2009	Laadam	Prabhu Solomon	Tamil	16 Days (Telugu)	Dharmavarapu Subrahmanyam replaces Chitti Babu, Ramjagan replaces Lollu Sabha Manohar	
2009	Yavarum Nalam	Vikram Kumar	Tamil	13-Padamoodu (Telugu)	Additional scenes with Ravi Babu	
2009	Sweet Heart	Jai Akash	Telugu	Maamaram (Tamil; 2025)	Scenes with Jai Akash reshot to suit nativity.	
2010	Yagam	P. A. Arun Prasad	Telugu	Sinam (Tamil)	Sathyaraj replaces Ajay, Sathyan replaces Harsha Vardhan	
2010	Super	Upendra	Kannada	Super (Telugu)	Ali and Sadhu Kokila switch roles	
2010	Rakta Charitra 2	Ram Gopal Varma	Telugu/Hindi	Ratha Sarithiram (Tamil)	Scenes featuring Suriya, Priyamani and Kitty additionally shot in Tamil. Scenes shot at the same time as filming of Telugu and Hindi versions.	
2011	Sabash Sariyana Potti	Venu Arvind	Tamil	Kochi to Kodambakkam (Malayalam, 2012)	Additional scenes with Innocent, Dinesh Panicker, Archana, Sarada and Reena Basheer	
2012	Nuvvekkadunte Nenakkadunta	Subha Selvam	Telugu	Oru Mutham Oru Yuddham (Tamil)	Manobala replaces A.V.S., Vennira Aadai Moorthy replaces Brahmanandam	
2013	Dracula 2012	Vinayan	Malayalam	Naankam Pirai (Tamil), Punnami Rathri (Telugu)	Scenes involving Ganja Karuppu and Manobala for Tamil version; Scenes involving Krishna Bhagavan for Telugu version	
2013	Win	Vinod Kumar	Telugu	Win (Tamil; 2015)	Scenes with Jai Akash reshot to suit nativity. Additional scenes with Shankar-Ganesh and Vengal Rao.	
2014	Vasanthathinte Kanal Vazhikalil	Anil V Nagendran	Malayalam	Veeravanakkam (Tamil, 2025)	Additional scenes with Samuthirakani and Bharath	
2014	Donga Prema	Jai Akash	Telugu	Yokkiyan (Tamil, 2023)	Directed by Saiprabha Meena; additional scenes with Chaams	
2015	JK Enum Nanbanin Vaazhkai	Cheran	Tamil	Rajadhi Raja (Telugu, 2016)	Re-shot scenes to suit nativity with Sharwanand, Nithya Menen, Prakash Raj and Jayaprakash	
2015	Mythri	R. Giriraj	Kannada	My Hero Mythri (Malayalam)	Kalabhavan Mani replaces Ravi Kale; Additional scenes with Anu Joseph and Sajitha Betti	
2015	Samrajyam II: Son of Alexander	Perarasu	Malayalam	Tihar (Tamil)	R. Parthiban replaces Mammootty, Jiya Irani replaces Captain Raju, Kadhal Dhandapani replaces Kalashala Babu, M. S. Bhaskar replaces Suraj Venjaramoodu, additional scenes with Priyanka Thimmesh, Pondy Ravi, and Kottachi	
2016	Idhu Namma Aalu	Pandiraj	Tamil	Sarasudu (Telugu)	Satyam Rajesh replaces Soori	
2016	Manamantha	Chandra Sekhar Yeleti	Telugu	Vismayam (Malayalam)	Joy Mathew replaces Gollapudi Maruti Rao, P. Balachandran replaces Chandra Mohan	
2016	Golisoda	Raghu Jaya	Kannada	Evadu Thakkuva Kadu (Telugu)	Additional end credits song shot; Comedy scene with Raghu Karumanchi, Chammak Chandra, RK Mama, and Rocket Raghava reshot	
2017	Nene Raju Nene Mantri	Teja	Telugu	Naan Aanaiyittal (Tamil)	Nassar replaces Jaya Prakash Reddy, Additional scenes with Mayilsamy, Jagan and R. S. Shivaji	
2018	Krishnam	Dinesh Baboo	Malayalam	Dear Krishna (Telugu, 2025)	Avinash replaces Sai Kumar, Sameer replaces Renji Panicker	
2019	Kiss	A. P. Arjun	Kannada	Kiss Me Idiot (Tamil, 2025)	Additional scenes with Robo Shankar and Nanjil Vijayan. Additional score composed by Prakash Nikki.	
2019	Maarconi Mathaai	Sanil Kalathil	Malayalam	Kadhal Kadhai Sollava (Tamil, 2026)	Additional scenes with Nakkhul, Rittika Sen, Suresh, Kalyani Natarajan, and Cool Suresh. Additional song composed by Sharreth.	
2019	Dandupalya 4 (also Dandupalya franchise)	Srinivas Raju, K. T. Nayak	Kannada	Dandupalyam (Tamil)	Tamil version directed by Tiger Venkaat; Additional scenes with Sonia Agarwal, Vanitha Vijayakumar, Supergood Subramani, and Birla Bose	
2022	Dejavu	Arvindh Srinivasan	Tamil	Repeat (Telugu)	Naveen Chandra replaces Arulnithi	
2023	Hostel Hudugaru Bekagiddare	Nithin Krishnamurthy	Kannada	Hostel Boys (Telugu)	Rashmi Gautam replaces Ramya, Tharun Bhascker replaces Diganth Manchale	

=== Same release dates ===
- Note: this film features a list of films first shot in one language with simultaneous partial reshoots in another language. Both versions of the film were released on the same date.

Year	Films	Director(s)	Language	Reshot as	Notes	Ref.
1996	Indian	S. Shankar	Tamil	Hindustani (Hindi)	Aruna Irani replaces Manorama	
2002	123	K. Subash	Tamil	123 (Kannada, Telugu)	Uttej (Telugu version) and Komal Kumar (Kannada version) replace Karunas as thief	
2007	Raakilipattu	Priyadarshan	Malayalam	Friendship (Hindi)	Bharati Achrekar replaces K. P. A. C. Lalitha. (Tamil-Malayalam bilingual film, only Malayalam version was dubbed in Hindi)	
2007	Sivaji	Shankar	Tamil	Sivaji (Telugu)	Additional footage of Rajinikanth dressed as Telugu actors	
2008	Vambu Sandai	Raj Kapoor	Tamil	Lakshmi Putrudu (Telugu)	Additional scenes with Brahmanandam, Raghu Babu, and Duvvasi Mohan and an additional item number with Mumaith Khan	
2008	Saroja	Venkat Prabhu	Tamil	Saroja (Telugu)	Srihari replaces Jayaram	
2009	Kanthaswamy	Susi Ganesan	Tamil	Mallanna (Telugu)	Brahmanandam replaces Vadivelu, Gundu Hanumantha Rao replaces Muthukaalai, Kallu Chidambaram replaces Vengal Rao, Rocket Raghava replaces Halwa Vasu	
2009	Jaganmohini	N. K. Viswanathan	Tamil	Jaganmohini (Telugu)	Ali replaces Vadivelu, Gundu Hanumantha Rao replaces Vennira Aadai Moorthy	
2012	This Weekend	Tinu Verma	Hindi	Kaatu Puli (Tamil); Aranyam (Telugu)	Reshot climax to suit nativity with Arjun Sarja	
2012	Kadhalil Sodhappuvadhu Yeppadi	Balaji Mohan	Tamil	Love Failure (Telugu)	Reshot scenes to suit nativity with Siddharth, Amala Paul, Suresh and Surekha Vani	
2012	English Vinglish	Gauri Shinde	Hindi	English Vinglish (Tamil)	Ajith Kumar replaces Amitabh Bachchan	
2013	David	Bejoy Nambiar	Hindi	David (Tamil)	Vinay Virmani's segment reshot with Jiiva and the same supporting cast (except for Sunder Ramu)	
2013	Attahasa	A. M. R. Ramesh	Kannada	Vana Yuddham (Tamil)	Reshot scenes to suit nativity with Arjun Sarja and Besant Ravi	
2013	Theeya Velai Seiyyanum Kumaru	Sundar C	Tamil	Something Something (Telugu)	Brahmanandam replaces Santhanam, Venu Madhav replaces Manobala, Sudha replaces Sriranjani, Gautam Raju replaces George Maryan, Rana Daggubati replaces Vishal	
2014	Aaha Kalyanam	Gokul Krishna	Tamil	Aaha Kalyaanam (Telugu)	Re-shot climax and songs to suit nativity with Nani and Vaani Kapoor	
2016	Ilamai Oonjal	Mangai Harirajan	Tamil	Sikkapatte Ishtapatte (Kannada)	Ashok Rao replaces Vijayakumar	
2017	Baahubali 2: The Conclusion	S. S. Rajamouli	Telugu	Baahubali 2: The Conclusion (Tamil)	Reshot scenes to suit nativity (mainly of Ramya Krishnan, Nassar and Sathyaraj)	
2017	Velaiilla Pattadhari 2	Soundarya Rajinikanth	Tamil	VIP 2 (Telugu)	Reshot scenes to suit nativity with Dhanush	
2017	Veedevadu	Tatineni Satya	Telugu	Yaar Ivan (Tamil)	Reshot scenes to suit nativity (mainly of Kishore, Prabhu, and Sathish)	
2018	Lakshmi	A. L. Vijay	Tamil	Lakshmi (Telugu)	Satyam Rajesh replaces Karunakaran; reshot scenes with Kovai Sarala and George Maryan, few scenes of Prabhu Deva, Aishwarya Rajesh and Ditya Bhande reshot	
2018	K.G.F: Chapter 1	Prashanth Neel	Kannada	K.G.F: Chapter 1 (Hindi)	Additional item song "Gali Gali" with Mouni Roy, shortened version of "Jokae" featuring Tamannaah	
2019	Peranbu	Ram	Tamil	Peranbu (Malayalam)	Suraj Venjaramoodu replaces Aruldoss, Siddique replaces Samuthirakani	
2020	Nishabdham	Hemant Madhukar	Telugu	Silence (Tamil)	Scenes featuring Anjali and Srinivas Avasarala reshot; scenes featuring R. Madhavan shot in Tamil	
2021	WWW	K. V. Guhan	Telugu	WWW (Tamil)	Sathish and Rajkumar replaces Satyam Rajesh and Priyadarshi	
2022	Jack N' Jill	Santhosh Sivan	Malayalam	Centimeter (Tamil)	Yogi Babu replaces Soubin Shahir	
2022	Sita Ramam	Hanu Raghavapudi	Telugu	Sita Ramam (Tamil)	Dialogue portions of "Kaanunna Kalyanam" song reshot in Tamil as "Kannukkule"	
2023	Micheal	Ranjit Jeyakodi	Telugu	Micheal (Tamil)	Climax scene with Sundeep Kishan and few scenes in the end reshot in Tamil	
2023	Vasantha Mullai	Ramanan Purushothama	Tamil	Vasantha Kokila (Kannada)	Rakshit Shetty replaces Arya	
2023	Vimanam	Ranjit Jeyakodi	Telugu	Vimanam (Tamil)	Few dialogues with Samuthirakani and Rajendran reshot in Tamil	
2023	Jawan	Atlee	Hindi	Jawan (Tamil)	Yogi Babu replaces Mukesh Chhabra "Zinda Banda" song reshot in Tamil as "Vandha Edam"; Vijay Sethupathi's portions reshot in Tamil	
2024	Aranmanai 4	Sundar C	Tamil	Baak (Telugu)	Vennela Kishore and Srinivasa Reddy replace Yogi Babu and VTV Ganesh respectively	
2024	Kalki 2898 AD	Nag Ashwin	Telugu	Kalki 2898 AD (Hindi)	Reshot a few scenes with Deepika Padukone, Amitabh Bachchan and Saswata Chatterjee in Hindi	
2025	Ramam Raghavam	Dhanraj Koranani	Telugu	Ramam Raghavam (Tamil)	Few dialogues with Samuthirakani reshot in Tamil	
2025	Vrusshabha	Nanda Kishore	Telugu	Vrusshabha (Malayalam)	Reshot scenes to suit nativity, mostly that of Mohanlal	
2025	Mark	Vijay Karthikeyaa	Kannada	(Mark, Tamil)	Scenes featuring Tamil actors were simultaneously reshot.	

== Footage reused ==
- Note: this list does not include sequels, spinoffs, cinematic universe films or non-remake films by the same director.

Year	Films	Director(s)	Language	Notes	Ref.
1990	Shiva	Ram Gopal Varma	Hindi	Hindi remake of Shiva; Reused 4 songs from the Telugu original	
2009	Ravana	Yogish Hunsur	Kannada	Kannada remake of Kaadhal Kondein, flashback portions from the Tamil original dubbed in the Kannada remake	
2011	Vaanam	Krish Jagarlamudi	Tamil	Tamil remake of Vedam, Scenes involving Anushka Shetty, Nikki, Vajja Venkata Giridhar, Brahmanandam and Prudhvi Raj were dubbed from the Telugu original	

== Films containing dialogues in another language that was dubbed over ==
- This includes films that were majorly shot in one language, but a small portion was shot in another language, which was dubbed back into the original version.

Year	Films	Director(s)	Language	Notes	Ref.
2019	Lisaa	Raju Viswanath	Tamil	The scenes with Brahmanandam and Surekha Vani were shot in Telugu.	

== See also ==
- Pan-Indian film
- Multiple-language version
- List of longest films in India
