= Viraatapalem =

2025 Indian web series

- Promotional poster
- Genre: Supernatural thriller
- Written by: Divya Thejaswi Pera
- Screenplay by: Vikram Kumar Kandimalla
- Directed by: Poluru Krishna
- Starring: Abhignya Vuthaluru; Charan Lakkaraju; Lavanya Sahukara; Ramaraju; Gowtham Raju; Sathish
- Music by: Rohith Kumar
- Country of origin: India
- Original language: Telugu
- No. of seasons: 1
- No. of episodes: 7

Production
- Producer: K. V. Sriram
- Production locations: Andhra Pradesh, India
- Cinematography: Mahesh K Swaroop
- Editor: Chandrashekar
- Production company: South Indian Screens

Original release
- Network: ZEE5
- Release: 26 June 2025 – present

Viraatapalem: PC Meena Reporting is a 2025 Telugu-language supernatural thriller that premiered on ZEE5 on 26 June 2025. The series is directed by Poluru Krishna, known for the crime drama Recce, and produced by K. V. Sriram under the South Indian Screens banner. It stars YouTuber-turned-actress Abhignya Vuthaluru in the title role, alongside Charan Lakkaraju.

== Premise ==
Set in the 1980s in the fictional village of Viraatapalem, the series follows a mysterious curse believed to cause newlywed brides to die on their wedding day. As a result, marriages have been avoided in the village for over a decade. Police constable Meenakshi, known as PC Meena, is transferred to the village and begins investigating the deaths. She is joined by Kittu, a reformed convict, as they explore the village's past and attempt to uncover the truth behind the incidents.

== Cast and characters ==
- Abhignya Vuthaluru as PC Meenakshi
- Charan Lakkaraju as Kittu
- Lavanya Sahukara as Bhramaramba
- Ramaraju as the village president
- Gowtham Raju as the head constable

== Production ==
The series is developed by South Indian Screens in collaboration with ZEE5. It was filmed in rural Andhra Pradesh. Poluru Krishna directed the series, while the original story was conceived by Divya Thejaswi Pera and adapted into a screenplay by Vikram Kumar Kandimalla.

== Release ==
Viraatapalem: PC Meena Reporting was released on ZEE5 on 26 June 2025.

== Episodes ==
No.	Title	Directed by	Original release date
1	"The Red Wedding"	Krishna Poluru	26 June 2025
Residents of Viraatapalem attribute the recent death of a newlywed woman, Durga, to a local curse. Meanwhile, Meena, a young police officer, is assigned to the village to investigate.
2	"The Bride and the Curse"	Krishna Poluru	26 June 2025
Ranga, a villager, marries Malli despite local superstitions surrounding a curse. Shortly afterward, Malli collapses near the temple and dies suddenly, leading the community to attribute her death to the rumored curse.
3	"Staking It All"	Krishna Poluru	26 June 2025
Meena attempts to file a case regarding Malli’s unexplained death, but the process is delayed. During this time, the village president proposes that Meena marry his son, and he is taken aback by her response.
4	"Encounter With The Truth"	Krishna Poluru	26 June 2025
As preparations for Meena’s wedding to the village president’s son commence, villagers grow increasingly anxious that the curse will claim another victim. When Meena collapses during the celebrations, she responds by officially filing a case, identifying herself as a target of the supposed curse.
5	"Forever Bride"	Krishna Poluru	26 June 2025
Meena initiates a thorough investigation to uncover the truth behind the unexplained deaths. As her inquiry progresses, her wedding is suddenly canceled. Her pursuit of the case leads her into increasingly perilous circumstances.
6	"The Last Straw"	Krishna Poluru	26 June 2025
Meena’s investigation is hindered when she receives a transfer order. During a visit to the headquarters, she learns that Narsayya was behind the recommendation for her transfer. Suspecting ulterior motives, Meena begins to investigate Narsayya’s background.
7	"Mystery of Viraatapalem"	Krishna Poluru	26 June 2025
With the village president’s support, Meena assists two villagers in getting married, challenging the widespread fear of the curse. Meanwhile, she races to uncover the true cause of the deaths before anyone else becomes a victim.

== Reception ==
Viraatapalem: PC Meena Reporting received mixed to negative reviews from critics.

Chitrajyothy described the series as a "nail-biting thriller" with a promising storyline but noted inconsistencies in screenplay and pacing that diluted its impact. Deccan Chronicle remarked that "Viraatapalem starts with a promising premise of a cursed village and a determined female constable, but unfortunately, it gets lost in its own underdeveloped plot. Despite flashes of potential in its suspense and commentary on workplace gender dynamics, the series ultimately delivers a predictable and routine narrative."

Siddartha Toleti of M9 News observed that the series "has a decent setup. However, the execution and the writing are so amateurish that it’s impossible to stick through, even for hardcore thriller lovers.". 123Telugu echoed similar sentiments, stating that "Viraatapalem: PC Meena Reporting is a textbook example of how a decent concept can be dragged down by clueless writing, lifeless performances, and carelessly stitched episodes that lead absolutely nowhere."

Scroll.in highlighted the protagonist, a tough cop investigating mysterious deaths. Avad Mohammad of OTTplay rated 2.5 out of 5 stars and stated "The Abhigya Vuthaluru starrer starts on an interesting note but gets botched up and become a forced crime thriller."
