= Thala (2025 film) =

2025 Indian Telugu-language film by Amma Rajashekar

- Theatrical release poster
- Directed by: Amma Rajashekar
- Written by: Amma Rajashekar
- Produced by: Sreenivasa Goud
- Starring: Amma Raagin Raj; Ankitha Naskar
- Cinematography: Shyam K. Naidu
- Edited by: Shiva Sarni
- Music by: Aslam keyi,Dharma Teja
- Production company: Deepa Arts
- Release date: 14 February 2025
- Country: India
- Language: Telugu

Thala is a 2025 Indian Telugu-language action drama film written and directed by Amma Rajashekar. The film features Amma Raagin Raj and Ankitha Naskar in lead roles.

The film was released on 14 February 2025.

== Plot ==
Sridevi runs away after the wedding night hoping to become a heroine but becomes a junior artist to take care of Rambabu. Rambabu searches for his father whose name is also Rambabu to unite his family. Rambabu finds his father who owns a chicken shop and is married to Lakshmi. Rambabu starts to work in his father's shop under the name of Chandra. Lakshmi's niece, Pooja stays at Lakshmi's house. Gurudev is a religious gangster who mistreats people from other religions and kills the people who oppose him. Rambabu and Pooja fall in love with each other. Rambabu kills Gurudev to save Lakshmi's family and reveals his true identity. Gurudev's brother, Ramdev chase the family and kills Rahul who was helping the family to escape. Babloo, a police officer, keeps Rambabu's family safe with his family and places Rambabu in juvenile prison. Rambabu spends time in prison under the name of Saleem. Inside the prison, Gurudev's men try to kill Rambabu but Rambabu kills everyone. Rambabu is released from prison and runs into a forest to escape from Ramdev. Tribal people who work for Ramdev chase Rambabu throughout the forest but Rambabu kills most of the tribal people and escape the forest. Rambabu reaches Eswari's house and Eswari's son, Jayadev brings Rambabu's family to Eswari's house. Ramdev kills babloo's family. A flashback reveals that Eswari is Suryadev's first wife and Gajalakshmi is Suryadev's second wife. Suryadev's family unite at Eswari's house and try to kill Rambabu. Suryadev requests Rambabu to kill him as he can't bare to witness the cruelty anymore done by his family. Rambabu kills Suryadev, Jayadev and Ramdev. Rambabu's family unite.

== Cast ==
- Raagin Raj
- Ankitha Naskar
- Rohit
- Ester Noronha
- Mukku Avinash
- Satyam Rajesh
- Ajay
- Viji Chandrasekhar
- Rajeev Kanakala
- Indraja
- Sravan
- Santosham Suresh
- Radha Rajasekhar

== Music ==
All music is composed by Dharma Teja.

No.	Title	Lyrics	Singer(s)	Length
1.	"Prema Kuttindantey"	Dharma Teja	Bholey Shavali	3:26

== Release and reception ==
Thala was released on 14 February 2025. It was released on 10 March 2025.

Sakshi Post gave a rating of 3 out of 5 and mentioned that direction, performances of the lead cast, cinematography and editing are the positives. News18 Telugu rated the film 2.75 out of 5.
