= Prema Loka =

1987 Indian film by Ravichandran

- DVD cover in Kannada
- Directed by: V. Ravichandran
- Written by: V. Ravichandran; Hamsalekha (Kannada dialogues); Panchu Arunachalam (Tamil dialogues)
- Based on: Grease 2 by Ken Finkleman
- Produced by: V. Ravichandran; N. Veeraswamy (presenter)
- Starring: V. Ravichandran; Juhi Chawla
- Cinematography: R. Madhusudan
- Edited by: K. Balu
- Music by: Hamsalekha
- Distributed by: Sri Eswari Productions
- Release date: 14 January 1987
- Running time: 147 minutes (Premaloka); 141 minutes (Paruva Ragam)
- Country: India
- Languages: Kannada; Tamil
- Budget: ₹1.25 crores

Prema Loka (transl. World of love) is a 1987 Indian romantic musical film written and directed by Ravichandran in his directorial debut. The film was simultaneously made in Kannada and Tamil, with the Tamil version titled Paruva Ragam (transl. The Melody of Age). It was produced by N. Veeraswamy and is based on the 1982 American musical Grease 2. The film stars Ravichandran and Juhi Chawla in the lead roles. The plot follows Ravi, a college student who falls in love with Shashikala, a fellow student, and navigates challenges involving family conflicts, arranged marriage, and his secret identity as a mysterious biker.

Prema Loka marked Ravichandran’s debut as a director and producer. The film’s soundtrack, composed by Hamsalekha, was highly successful, with the music receiving widespread appreciation and record-breaking sales. The film's success led to Ravichandran's rise as a prominent figure in the Kannada film industry. Juhi Chawla later recalled her experiences on the set as formative for her career in Hindi cinema.

== Plot ==
Ravi is a happy-go-lucky college student who lives with his parents Govardhan Rao and Girija, but considers his maid Sharadamma as his family as he never felt loved by his parents due to their business schedules. One day, Ravi accidentally meets Shashikala at the market, he meets her again at his college and learns that she is a newly joined student. On the occasion of the college's diamond jubilee, the college director wishes to hold a ceremony in order to celebrate and get donations. The principal's suggestion of a small pooja is rebuked and the college Prof. Manohar is chosen to plan a grand spectacle with the other students.

A motorcycle gang tries to derail the planning, but they are held off and the stage is set up without a hitch. However, Shashikala is accosted by the gang and has to hide, where she runs into Ravi. The preparations continue, where the gang again harass the students and all hope seems lost after they beat up the students who stand in their way. However, a mysterious biker rescues them and beats up the gang. Shashikala falls in love with him and receives the biker's jacket. Shashikala continues to reject Ravi's advances while fantasizing over the mysterious biker.

During the night of the show's musical performance, the gang comes back to disrupt the afterparty and Shashikala ends up fainting from the chaos. The biker again saves the students and Shashikala regains consciousness and sees him. The biker reveals himself as Ravi. Though hesitant at first, Shashikala accepts his feelings and her love for him, but Ravi's parents have arranged his marriage to the CM's daughter Rajini as a way of gaining prestige. Rajini tries to find Ravi with the help of the principal and Inspector Srinath, who happens to be Shashikala's father. Shashikala learns from the principal about Ravi's arranged marriage, and she runs away from him heartbroken after assuming that Ravi has cheated her.

Meanwhile, Ravi finally realizes what has happened and goes home, where he is scolded for what he has done. His parents ask Sharadamma to convince him to accept the marriage, Ravi instead becomes enraged and trashes his room in a fit of rage. Shashikala is yelled at and slapped by her parents for loving Ravi. Finally, Ravi goes to Shashikala's house and yells his grievances while jumping around and breaking more things. Realizing her love for him, Ravi and Shashikala emotionally reunite and run away the next morning.

In response, Shashikala's father claims that Ravi kidnapped Shashikala and sends the police to catch them. Swapping positions with a couple in a wedding procession, they are about to get married until the principal, Prof. Manohar and their parents confront them. Ravi and Shashikala manage to convince their parents, principal and Prof. Manohar; they all finally agree. Ravi and Shashikala get married and they leave to a countryside for their honeymoon.

== Cast ==
Actor (Kannada)	Actor (Tamil)	Role
V. Ravichandran		Ravi
Juhi Chawla		Shashikala (Shashi)
Leelavathi	Manorama	Sharadamma / Thayamma
Lokesh	Jaishankar	Ravi's father
Srinath	Delhi Ganesh	Shashi's father
Thyagu		Ravi's friend
Jayachitra		Kaveri
Mukhyamantri Chandru	Poornam Viswanathan	Chief Minister
K. Vijaya	Vadivukkarasi	Ravi's mother
Tiger Prabhakar	Cho Ramaswamy	College principal
Guest appearances: (Note: Both versions credit the following actors as making guest appearances in the film. The Kannada version additionally credits Tiger Prabhakar, Srinath, and Lokesh as making guest appearances in the film while the Tamil version does not credit their respective actors as making guest appearances.)		
Vishnuvardhan		Professor Manohar
Ambareesh	Thengai Srinivasan	Hotel supplier
Urvashi		Rohini

== Production ==
Prema Loka marked the directorial debut of V. Ravichandran. The film was supposed to be produced by K. C. N. Chandru who later backed out due to the film's high budget and high number of songs hence Ravichandran himself produced it. For the lead actress, Ravichandran rejected 52 girls before choosing Juhi Chawla. Apart from composing music, Hamsalekha also wrote lyrics for the soundtrack album and dialogues for the film. When Ravichandran was mulling over the theme of the film, Hamsalekha suggested him to do a musical script on the lines of The Sound of Music and Grease 2. Jolly Bustin, who went on to become an action choreographer, worked as a body double for Ravichandran.

Leelavathi and Lokesh appeared in supporting roles in the Kannada version. The Tamil version featured Jaishankar and Manorama in supporting roles. Vishnuvardhan, Ambareesh, Tiger Prabhakar, Srinath and Urvashi made guest appearances in the film. Thengai Srinivasan, Cho Ramaswamy and Delhi Ganesh portray the respective roles of Ambareesh, Prabhakar and Srinath in the Tamil version.

== Soundtrack ==
Hamsalekha composed the music for the film (in his Tamil debut) and also penned the lyrics for the Kannada soundtrack while Vairamuthu and Rajasri penned the lyrics for the Tamil and Telugu soundtrack. The soundtrack album consists of eleven tracks. The distribution rights were bought by Lahari Music for a hitherto record price of ₹150,000.

The music was widely appreciated and created records in the audio cassette sales during the time. Tulsiram Naidu aka Lahari Velu of Lahari Music wrote in 2015, "Premaloka continues to be the biggest hit among film music albums in Kannada cinema. Back then audio rights were sold for a pittance and nominally paid ₹100 or ₹1,000. With Premaloka things changed and rights began to be sold in lakhs." The lyrics of the soundtrack also received acclaim from critics. The soundtrack sold 38 lakhs (3.8 million) units, setting a record for South Indian soundtrack albums.

The lyrics of two songs from Grease 2 – "Back to School Again" and "Who's That Guy?" were retained as "Geleyare Nanna Gelathiyare" and "Yaarivanu". Another song "Premalokadinda Banda" was an adaptation of the 1986 Taiwanese Hokkien pop song "Reflections In The Cup" (also known as "Cup (in the) Shadow") (Chinese: 杯中影) composed by Taiwanese musician Chen Hong (Chinese: 陳宏) and sung by Taiwanese singer Chen Hsiao-yun (Chinese: 陳小雲).

All lyrics are written by Hamsalekha.

Kannada track listing
No.	Title	Singer(s)	Length
1.	"Premalokadinda"	S. Janaki, K. J. Yesudas	4:34
2.	"Geleyare Nanna Gelathiyare"	S. P. Balasubrahmanyam	5:31
3.	"Ee Nimbe Hanninantha"	Ramesh	2:59
4.	"Nodamma Hudugi"	S. P. Balasubrahmanyam, Latha Hamsalekha	5:14
5.	"Cheluve Ondu Kelthini"	S. P. Balasubrahmanyam, S. Janaki	4:19
6.	"Yaarivanu Ee Manmathanu"	S. Janaki	4:49
7.	"Boy Friend Barthaanantha"	S. Janaki	4:25
8.	"E Gangu Ee Biku Kalisikodu"	S. P. Balasubrahmanyam, S. Janaki	4:44
9.	"Idu Nanna Ninna Prema Geethe"	S. P. Balasubrahmanyam, S. Janaki	4:33
10.	"Mosagaarana"	S. P. Balasubrahmanyam	4:21
11.	"Bathroominalli"	Vani Jayaram	2:10
Total length:			47:39

All lyrics are written by Vairamuthu.

Tamil track listing
No.	Title	Singer(s)	Length
1.	"Kadhal Illai"	S. Janaki, K. J. Yesudas	4:34
2.	"Paadum Ilam"	S. P. Balasubrahmanyam	5:31
3.	"Oru Minnal Pola"	Ramesh	2:59
4.	"Kelamma Kelamma"	S. P. Balasubrahmanyam, S. Janaki	5:14
5.	"Poove Unnai Nesithen"	S. P. Balasubrahmanyam, S. Janaki	4:19
6.	"Yaar Evano"	S. Janaki	4:49
7.	"Adea Amma Kannu"	S. Janaki	4:25
8.	"Hey Maama Vandi Otta"	S. P. Balasubrahmanyam, S. Janaki	4:44
9.	"Oru Aanum Pennum"	S. P. Balasubrahmanyam, S. Janaki	4:33
10.	"Mosakaarana Naan"	S. P. Balasubrahmanyam	4:21
11.	"Vanavillai Parthen"	Vani Jayaram	2:10
Total length:			47:39

All lyrics are written by Rajasri

Telugu track listing
No.	Title	Singer(s)	Length
1.	"Paruvam Needenani"	S. P. Balasubrahmanyam	5:57
2.	"Satileni Premalokam"	S. P. Balasubrahmanyam, S. Janaki	4:35
3.	"Toli Aasalu Pongee"	S. P. Balasubrahmanyam, S. Janaki	4:33
4.	"Boy Friend – Boy Friend"	S. Janaki	4:23
5.	"Nuvve Nenani Thalachaane"	S. P. Balasubrahmanyam, S. Janaki	4:18
6.	"Chilakamma Chittemma"	S. P. Balasubrahmanyam, P. Susheela	5:14
7.	"Oka Muddabanthi"	M. Ramesh	2:58
8.	"Evare Veedu"	S. Janaki	4:54
9.	"Eh Mama Biku Nerpava"	S. P. Balasubrahmanyam, S. Janaki	4:45
10.	"Mosagaadina"	S. P. Balasubrahmanyam	4:22
11.	"Levandi Premikulu"	P. Susheela	2:09
Total length:			48:14

== Release and reception ==
Premaloka opened to an underwhelming response for the first few days, but became successful a month after the release due to positive word-of-mouth and soundtrack being repeatedly playing on television. By contrast, Paruva Ragam underperformed due to competition from other bigger films. Reviewing this version, Jayamanmadhan of Kalki praised Ravichandran, who has shown a normal story in an awe-inspiring CinemaScope size and requested him to tone down songs in his next film.

Premaloka was dubbed into Telugu as Premalokam.

== Legacy ==
One of the songs, "Nodamma Hudugi", was reused by Sundeep Malani for his Kanglish film SMS 6260. Hamsalekha would go on to compose music for many more Ravichandran films. This film established Ravichandran as new entry star in Kannada film industry.

Juhi Chawla recalling her experiences noted, "My 45-day shoot for Premaloka ensured that going on the set of Qayamat Se Qayamat Tak was a cakewalk. The other good thing about Premaloka was that the team was young, so it was like college buddies hanging out. [..] Since the film was a musical, it was like a party on the set. The only senior person there was our cinematographer. I fondly look back at my stint in Kannada cinema during my early days as the foundation for my career in Bollywood".

== Sequel ==
In March 2024, Ravichandran announced he would direct a sequel. It was expected to begin production in late May, but has yet to begin.
