= Ramaraju (actor) =

Indian actor

- Born: 6 May 1961 (age 65); London, United Kingdom
- Other names: Mahadevan (in Tamil and Malayalam)
- Citizenship: Indian
- Occupation: Actor
- Years active: 1980–present

Ramaraju (born 6 May 1961), also known as Mahadevan, is an Indian actor who works predominantly in Telugu, Tamil and Malayalam films. He first appeared in the Telugu film Challenge Ramudu (1980) and is best known for Aswini (1991), Pithamagan (2003), Krishna Gaadi Veera Prema Gaadha (2016) and Uppena (2021).

== Early life and career ==
Ramaraju was born in London, United Kingdom into a Telugu family. During his birth in London, his father was a doctor and had moved there for higher studies. Their family later moved to Chennai, Tamil Nadu, where he was raised and completed his studies.

Ramaraju debuted with the Telugu film Challenge Ramudu (1980) and later worked as an assistant cameraman in Malayalam films. He moved to Hyderabad in 1999 for a career in films. Since early 2000s he became an active actor and got his breakthrough portraying the antagonist in the Bala's Tamil film Pithamagan (2003). He reprised his role in the Kannada remake Anatharu (2007).

== Filmography ==
=== Telugu films ===
- Challenge Ramudu (1980)
- Vande Mataram (1985)
- Illaliko Pariksha (1985)
- Aswini (1991)
- Muddayi Muddugumma (1995)
- Mrugam (1996)
- Sri Krishnarjuna Vijayam (1996)
- Anaganaga Oka Roju (1997)
- Anthapuram (1998)
- Kauravudu (2000)
- Vijayaramaraju (2000)
- Narasimha Naidu (2001)
- Seema Simham (2002)
- Bharatasimha Reddy (2002)
- Amma Nanna O Tamila Ammayi (2003)
- Palnati Brahmanayudu (2003)
- Tagore (2003)
- 143 (2004)
- Pandem (2005)
- Are (2005)
- Hungama (2005)
- Oka Oorilo (2005)
- Chinnodu (2006)
- Souryam (2008)
- Ekaloveyudu (2008)
- Venkatadri (2009)
- Manasara (2010)
- Kalyanram Kathi (2010)
- Damarukam (2012)
- Dalam (2013)
- Legend (2014)
- Vinavayya Ramayya (2015)
- Soggade Chinni Nayana (2016)
- Krishna Gaadi Veera Prema Gaadha (2016)
- Malupu (2016)
- Khaidi No. 150 (2017)
- Baahubali 2: The Conclusion (2017)
- Mahanubhavudu (2018)
- Middle Class Abbayi (2018)
- Bharat Ane Nenu (2018)
- Saakshyam (2018)
- Anthaku Minchi (2018)
- Padi Padi Leche Manasu (2018)
- Uppena (2021)
- Ardha Shathabdam (2021)
- Mercy Killing (2024)
- Zebra (2024)
- Nidurinchu Jahapana (2025)
- Mithra Mandali (2025)
- Shambhala (2025)

=== Tamil films ===
Year	Title	Role	Ref.
2003	Pithamagan	Sekar Vasudevan	
2004	Chatrapathy	Chakravarthy	
2004	Azhagesan	Neelakandan	
2004	Attagasam	Samudrakani Annachi	
2005	Daas	Minister Gurumoorthy	
2005	Aanai	Police Inspector	
2006	Chithiram Pesuthadi	Charu's uncle	
2006	Mercury Pookkal	Rathnam	
2006	Thagapansamy	Shanmugam	
2007	Muruga	Vinayaka Murthy	
2007	Achacho		
2007	Pirappu	Maradhu	
2007	Sabari	Minister	
2007	Sivaji	Astrologer	
2007	Ammuvagiya Naan	Nathan	
2008	Pirivom Santhippom	Saathappan	
2008	Dhaam Dhoom	Shenba’s father	
2009	Nesi	Anjali's father	
2009	Mathiya Chennai		
2009	Odipolama	Anjali's uncle	
2010	Ayyanar	Politician	
2011	Kaavalan	Devarajan	
2011	Appavi	Susa	
2011	Ayyan		
2011	Sadhurangam	Singaperumal	
2012	Maasi	Maasilamani's senior officer	
2013	Alex Pandian	Swamiji	
2013	Karuppampatti		
2013	Vellai Desathin Idhayam		
2014	Pannaiyarum Padminiyum	Shanmugam	
2014	Koottam	N. Laxman	
2014	Sooran		
2014	Meagamann	Chitti	
2015	Yagavarayinum Naa Kaakka	Minister Duraiarasan	
2015	Vaalu	Priya's father	
2017	143		

=== Malayalam films ===
Year	Title	Role
1988	Orkkappurathu	J. J. Mansion's henchman
2004	Natturajavu	Pulikattil Mathachan
2009	Ee Pattanathil Bhootham	Sathyatheerdhan / Raghavendran
2010	Thanthonni	Hafees Ali Ibrahim
2011	Sevenes	Ramakrishna Moorthy

=== Kannada film ===
Year	Title	Role	Ref.
2007	Anatharu	Estate Owner	

=== Television ===
Year	Title	Role	Language	Network
2015	Suryavamsam		Tamil	Zee Tamil
2022	Recce	Ranganayakulu	Telugu	ZEE5
2022	Maa Neella Tank	Narasimham	Telugu	ZEE5
2025	Viraatapalem	Village president	Telugu	ZEE5
2025	Devika & Danny	priest	Telugu	JioHotstar
