= Vasantha Geetam =

- Theatrical release poster
- Directed by: Singeetham Srinivasa Rao
- Written by: D. V. Narasa Raju (dialogues)
- Screenplay by: Singeetham Srinivasa Rao
- Story by: Singeetham Srinivasa Rao
- Produced by: Bhimavarpu Buchi Reddy
- Starring: Akkineni Nageswara Rao; Radha
- Cinematography: P. S. Selvaraj
- Edited by: Gautam Raju
- Music by: Chakravarthy
- Production company: Jyothi Art Creations
- Release date: 24 August 1984
- Running time: 136 minutes
- Country: India
- Language: Telugu

Vasantha Geetam (transl. Music of Spring) is a 1984 Telugu-language drama film, produced by Bhimavarpu Buchi Reddy under the Jyothi Art Creations banner and directed by Singeetham Srinivasa Rao. It stars Akkineni Nageswara Rao, Radha and music composed by Chakravarthy. The movie is a remake of director's own 1984 Kannada movie Shravana Banthu.

== Plot ==
The film begins with Kumar, a famous singer. Once on his tour, a mysteriously beautiful girl chases him in the form of a photograph. After that, he returns home; Kumar belongs to an orthodox Brahmin family, and his father, Parabrahma Sastry, adheres to customs & beliefs. One night, Kumar had a dream in which he viewed an ancient temple; surprisingly, the next day, he learned that it was the Siva Puram temple when his soul pulled him toward the destination. So, he immediately moves. On the way, he gets acquainted with a strange person, Varma, who speaks as if he knows him from the beginning when Kumar goes into a dichotomy and cannot understand what is happening. Varma takes him to the temple, where he gets the reincarnation memories, and Varma starts narrating their past to Kumar. Varma & Kumar are best friends in their previous lives; Varma is the son of Zamindar, whereas Kumar is an orphan, and they share a bond beyond a casual friendship. Here, Kumar is a great poet; Varma wants to publish his work when heading for it. He watches a dance program featuring a beautiful girl, Madhavi, a Devadasi. Varma falls for her; she likes poetry from Kumar, so Varma bluffs it is his work. But later, Madhavi realizes the truth when Kumar & Madhavi start picking each other, and their love blossoms. Meanwhile, Varma makes marriage arrangements with Madhavi, convincing her mother, Mandakini. During the marriage, Madhavi escapes; knowing it, Varma orders his henchmen to eliminate them as he knows that when Kumar & Madhavi are about to marry, the goons attack and beat them badly. By the time Varma awakens, it is too late; Kumar & Madhavi die in his lap. Distressed, Varma commits suicide out of remorse, his soul still revolving around, and he will not be freed until he makes penance for his sin. At present, Varma wants to reunite Kumar & Madhavi, and he tells Kumar that Madhavi is also taking rebirth in a Christian family like Mary. Now, Kumar plays a drama with the help of Varma and makes Mary fall in love. Surprisingly, Mary is the daughter of Kumar's maternal aunt Lakshmi, who has been exiled from the family for marrying a Christian Joseph. Due to family disputes, Jopesh & Parabrahma Sastry disagree with this alliance. In this situation, Varma & Kumar again play a drama with Mary, making their parents realize their mistake. Finally, the movie ends on a happy note with the marriage of Kumar & Mary, and Varma's soul is revealed, blessing the newly wedded couple.

== Cast ==
- Akkineni Nageswara Rao as Kumar
- Radha as Madhavi / Mary
- Gummadi as Parabrahma Sastry
- Kanta Rao as Joseph
- Nagesh as Varma
- Nutan Prasad as Prasad
- Balaji as James
- Pandari Bai as Parvathi
- Rama Prabha as Rama
- Srilakshmi as Madhavi's sister
- Athili Lakshmi as Lakshmi
- Jhansi as Mandakini
- Samyuktha as Rani
- Dubbing Janaki as Varma's mother

== Production ==
Vasantha Geetam is the debut film for Gautam Raju.

== Soundtrack ==
Vasantha Geetam

Film score by Chakravarthy
- Released: 1984
- Genre: Soundtrack
- Length: 22:02
- Label: AVM Audio
- Producer: Chakravarthy

Chakravarthy chronology
Anubandham (1984)	Vasantha Geetam (1984)	Tandava Krishnudu (1984)

Music composed by Chakravarthy. Music released on AVM Audio Company.

S. No.	Song title	Lyrics	Singers	length
1	"Eenati Paata"	C. Narayana Reddy	S. P. Balasubrahmanyam	3:58
2	"Raadelane"	Rajasri	S. Janaki	3:42
3	"Urvasivo"	C. Narayana Reddy	S. P. Balasubrahmanyam, S. Janaki	3:56
4	"Vasanthalu Virise Vela"	Veturi	S. P. Balasubrahmanyam, S. Janaki	3:37
5	"Brundavani Lo Sandyaragam"	Veturi	S. P. Balasubrahmanyam, S. Janaki	3:54
6	"Maduram Jeevana Sangeetham"	Veturi	S. P. Balasubrahmanyam, S. Janaki	3:35
