= Challenge Ramudu =

- Movie Poster
- Directed by: T. L. V. Prasad
- Written by: Jandhyala(dialogues)
- Screenplay by: T. L. V. Prasad
- Story by: Mahendran
- Produced by: T. Prakash Rao
- Starring: N. T. Rama Rao; Jaya Prada
- Cinematography: P. Devaraj
- Edited by: M. Kannan
- Music by: Chakravarthy
- Production company: Anil Productions
- Release date: 12 January 1980
- Running time: 149 mins
- Country: India
- Language: Telugu

Challenge Ramudu is a 1980 Telugu-language action film, produced by T. Prakash Rao under the Anil Productions banner and directed by T. L. V. Prasad. It stars N. T. Rama Rao, and Jaya Prada with music composed by Chakravarthy.

== Cast ==
- N. T. Rama Rao as Vijayaram
- Jaya Prada as Aruna
- Satyanarayana as Raghuram / James
- Gummadi as Justice Raja Shekaram
- Nutan Prasad as Raju
- Mikkilineni as Gopalam
- Kanta Rao as Dr. Ranga Rao
- Rallapalli as Thantha
- Narra Venkateswara Rao as Gangulu
- Haribabu as Albert
- Chalapathi Rao as Police Officer
- Geetha as Prema
- Jayamalini as item number
- Pushpalatha as Subhadra
- Tatineni Rajeswari as Lakshmi
- Satyakala as Suguna
- Master Ravi Shankar as Young Raju
- Ceylon Manohar as Vasthad
- Master Ramu as Young Vijay Ram
- Master Purushotham as Madhu / Bunty
- Ramaraju as Librarian

== Soundtrack ==
Challenge Ramudu

Film score by Chakravarthy
- Released: 1980
- Genre: Soundtrack
- Length: 18:50
- Producer: Chakravarthy

Chakravarthy chronology
Vetagadu (1979)	Challenge Ramudu (1980)	Aatagadu (1980)

The music for the film was composed by Chakravarthy. The song Pattuko Pattuko is a hit track which was remixed in Nandamuri Balakrishna's Okka Magadu (2008). Music released by SAREGAMA Audio Company.

S. No.	Song title	Lyrics	Singers	length
1	"Challagalestondi"	Acharya Aatreya	S. P. Balasubrahmanyam, P. Susheela	3:09
2	"Pattuko Pattuko"	Veturi	S. P. Balasubrahmanyam, P. Susheela	3:16
3	"Dora Dora Jampandu"	Veturi	S. P. Balasubrahmanyam, P. Susheela	2:57
4	"Pedata Pedata"	Veturi	S. P. Balasubrahmanyam, P. Susheela	3:09
5	"Ekkado Eppudo"	Veturi	S. P. Balasubrahmanyam, P. Susheela	3:13
6	"Koppadake Komalangi"	Acharya Aatreya	S. P. Balasubrahmanyam	3:06
