= Maa Awara Zindagi =

- Directed by: Depa Srikanth Reddy
- Produced by: Nandhyala Madhusudhan Reddy
- Starring: Srihan; Ajay; Saddam Hussain; Tarzan; Sayaji Shinde; Gautam Raju; Anupam Cherry; Jaswanth Cherukuri
- Cinematography: Shyam Vasili; Urukunda Reddy
- Edited by: Saibabu Talari
- Music by: Prateek Nag
- Production company: Vibha Entertainments
- Release date: 23 June 2023
- Running time: 108 minutes
- Country: India
- Language: Telugu

Maa Awara Zindagi is a 2023 Indian Telugu-language film directed by Depa Srikanth Reddy and produced by Nandhyala Madhusudhan Reddy under the Vibha Entertainment banner. It stars Srihan, Ajay, Sayaji Shinde, Saddam Hussain, Tarzan, Gautam Raju and Sayaji Shinde.

== Plot ==
Four friends who recently completed their B-Tech have nothing to do and are reprimanded by their parents for wasting their time. In the interim, they run into a human trafficking racket from there how they come out of that problem.

== Cast ==
- Srihan
- Ajay
- Gautam Raju
- Saddam Hussain
- Tarzan
- Sayaji Shinde
- Anupam Cherry
- Jaswanth Cherukuri

== Soundtrack ==
Maa Awara Zindagi

Soundtrack album by Prateek Nag
- Released: 2023
- Recorded: 2022–2023
- Genre: Feature film soundtrack
- Language: Telugu
- Label: Mango Music
- Producer: Prateek Nag

All music is composed by Prateek Nag.

Tracklist
No.	Title	Lyrics	Singer(s)	Length
1.	"Ra Ra Ra Awara Ra"	D Srikanth Reddy	Roll Rida	2:51
2.	"Thagubothu"	D Srikanth Reddy	L. V. Revanth	3:19

== Reception ==
Critics from Sakshi Post and Hindustan Times rated the film 2 1/2 out of 5.
