= Bhimavaram Bullodu =

- Poster
- Directed by: Udayasankar
- Screenplay by: Udayasankar
- Story by: Kavi Kalidas
- Produced by: Daggubati Suresh Babu
- Starring: Sunil; Ester Noronha; Vikramjeet Virk
- Cinematography: Santosh Rai Pathaje
- Edited by: Marthand K. Venkatesh
- Music by: Anoop Rubens
- Production company: Suresh Productions
- Release date: 27 February 2014
- Running time: 153 minutes
- Country: India
- Language: Telugu
- Budget: ₹ 7 crore
- Box office: ₹ 12.5 crore (full run) share

Bhimavaram Bullodu is a 2014 Indian Telugu-language film written by Kavi Kalidas and directed by Udayasankar. Produced by Daggubati Suresh Babu on his home banner Suresh Productions, the film features Sunil, Ester Noronha And Vikramjeet Virk in the lead roles. Anoop Rubens composed music for this film while Santosh Rai Pathaje and Marthand K. Venkatesh handled the cinematography and editing departments respectively.

The story follows a young brain tumor patient who wants to wipe off the rowdyism around himself and the troubles he faces once he starts the work and discovers that he is not a cancer patient. The film released worldwide on 21 February 2014. Upon release, the film received mostly negative reviews from critics, but had good box office collections.

== Cast ==
- Sunil as Rambabu
- Ester Noronha as Nandini
- Vikramjeet Virk as Vikram
- Sayaji Shinde as Nandini's father
- Subbaraju as Kondapalli Suri
- Posani Krishna Murali as Police Officer Posani, Rambabu's brother
- Satyam Rajesh as Rambabu's friend
- Telangana Shakuntala as Rambabu's grandmother
- Tanikella Bharani as a person who convinces Rambabu not to commit suicide
- Pruthviraj as a blind man
- Jaya Prakash Reddy as Reddy
- Ahuti Prasad as Doctor
- Raghu Babu as Kashi
- Srinivasa Reddy as Yadagiri
- Gautam Raju as villager
- Supreeth
- Raghu Karumanchi
- Thagubothu Ramesh
- Gundu Sudarshan as Sarath Babu, railway passenger

== Soundtrack ==
The music was composed by Anup Rubens and released by Aditya Music.

Track listing
No.	Title	Lyrics	Singer(s)	Length
1.	"Oka Vaipu Nuvvu"	Ramajogayya Sastry	Anup Rubens, Saindhavi	4:09
2.	"Supermanula"	Ananta Sriram	Dhanunjay, Pranathi, Pruthvi, Ramki	3:47
3.	"Premalo Paddanu Raa"	Chandrabose	Surabhi Shravani, Vijay Prakash	4:18
4.	"Pallakitho Vasthane"	Chandrabose	Raja Hasan, Ramya NSK	4:20
5.	"Bhimavaram Bullodu"	Chandrabose	Anjana Sowmya, Bhargavi Pillai, Megharaj	2:11
6.	"Oka Vaipu Nuvvu Rubens (Club Mix)"	Ramajogayya Sastry	Anup Rubens, Saindhavi	3:43
Total length:				22:28
