= Raat (film) =

1992 film by Ram Gopal Varma

Raat Raatri
- Release poster in Hindi
- Directed by: Ram Gopal Varma
- Written by: Ram Gopal Varma; Uttej (Telugu dialogues)
- Produced by: Ram Gopal Varma; Boney Kapoor(Presenter)
- Starring: Revathi; Chinna; Om Puri
- Cinematography: Teja
- Edited by: Shankar Suri
- Music by: Mani Sharma
- Production company: Varma Creations
- Release date: 7 February 1992
- Running time: 127 minutes
- Country: India
- Languages: Hindi; Telugu

Raat in Hindi or Raatri (transl. Night) in Telugu is a 1992 Indian supernatural horror-drama film written and directed by Ram Gopal Varma. Shot simultaneously in Hindi and Telugu, the film stars Revathi in the lead role. The background score was composed by Mani Sharma, and features only instrumental music with no songs.

The film is recognised for its attempt to introduce the horror genre to mainstream Indian cinema. It was also the final Telugu and Hindi film to be shot on 70 mm film. Raat received positive reviews upon its release.

== Plot ==
The Sharma family, comprising Mr. Sharma, his wife Shalini, their college-going daughter Manisha (alias "Mini"), and her young nephew Bunty, relocates into a suburban house that carries rumors of being haunted. Mini’s classmate and boyfriend, Deepak, frequently visits the residence. While exploring the basement, Bunty discovers a stray cat with a distinctly eerie, vacant stare. Shortly after, the cat wanders behind Mr. Sharma’s vehicle and is accidentally crushed to death as he reverses the car. To spare Bunty from grief, the family buries the animal in the backyard. Their eccentric elderly neighbor reacts with profound dread upon discovering that the family has occupied the property.

The family experiences their first unsettling shock when Bunty brings home a new cat that bears an uncanny, identical resemblance to the deceased one. Later, Mini and Deepak go for a motorcycle ride to the outskirts of the city. On their return journey, the motorcycle suffers a flat tire. Deepak hitches a ride with a passerby to a nearby village to procure a spare, instructing Mini to wait by the roadside. Upon his return, he discovers Mini weeping under a tree near a pond. When he approaches her, she glares at him with fierce, reddening eyes that mirror the dead cat’s gaze, causing a terrified Deepak to stumble into the water. Suddenly reverting to her normal self, Mini frantically calls out for him to climb out.

The following day, Mini accompanies her classmate, Rashmi, to a friend's wedding. During the event, Rashmi is brutally murdered inside a restroom, her neck completely snapped backwards. During the subsequent homicide investigation, the detective notices a deeply unsettling detail: while being questioned, a catatonic Mini absentmindedly twists the head of her doll in the exact manner Rashmi's neck was broken. Shortly after this realization, the investigating officer dies in a fatal vehicular accident. Terrified by their daughter's increasingly volatile behavior, Mini’s parents split on how to proceed. While Mr. Sharma seeks the assistance of a skeptical psychiatrist to run clinical tests like MRIs, an anxious Shalini consults the elderly neighbor.

The lady advises Shalini to seek the help of Sharji, a powerful exorcist. Before intervening, Sharji visits the Samadhi (shrine) of his deceased spiritual guru in a remote area to obtain consecrated ashes infused with mystical firepower. Upon inspecting the Sharma residence, Sharji detects a malevolent entity residing beneath the basement floorboards. He uncovers the history of the house: the ghost is that of Sunanda, the mistress of the previous homeowner, who had been brutally murdered by her paramour on the property. Concurrently, the ghost exacts vengeance on her actual killer; as he lies in bed with his new paramour, Sunanda's spectral arms emerge from the mattress and twist his neck.

The entity completely possesses Mini’s body, leading to a series of violent incidents, including an attempt to murder Deepak. Sharji confronts the possessed Mini in a final spiritual showdown. Utilizing sacred chants and the consecrated ashes, he successfully neutralizes the spirit, forcing it to exit Mini's body in a thundering flash of light. While Mr. Sharma remains convinced that the psychiatrist's medical treatments cured his daughter's psychosis, Sharji offers a different perspective, warning that the primordial darkness existing beyond human comprehension never truly vanishes, but merely recedes into the shadows.

== Cast ==
- Revathy as Manisha Sharma
- Chinna as Deepak, Manisha's boyfriend
- Rohini Hattangadi as Mrs. Sharma
- Akash Khurana as Mr. Sharma
- Om Puri as Sharji
- Anant Nag as the Psychiatrist
- Master Atit as Bunty
- Jaya Mathur as Rashmi
- Nirmalamma as the old lady
- Tej Sapru as the Inspector
- Sunanda as the spirit
- C. V. L. Narasimha Rao

== Production ==
Ram Gopal Varma later said that Raat was the first film he had wanted to make, predating his plans for Siva (1989). He recalled devoting particular attention to the film's camerawork, six-track stereophonic sound, music and Revathi's performance. Varma believed that the film's restrained approach was more subtle than the horror films commonly seen by Indian audiences at the time.

The film was made in both Hindi and Telugu. Filming took place at Annapurna Studios in Hyderabad. Teja served as cinematographer, Shankar Suri edited the film and Nivas handled sound recording.

== Music ==
The film's background score was composed by Mani Sharma, marking his debut as a film composer. The score is entirely instrumental, with the film containing no songs.

== Reception ==
=== Contemporary response ===
Upon its release, N. Krishnaswamy of The Indian Express gave Raat a positive review. He praised the film's technical execution and considered it an effective entry in the horror genre. Jasneet Singh of Collider.com gave "Raat" a positive review and commented "This Terrifying '90s Psychological Horror Changed Hindi Cinema Forever.

=== Retrospective response ===
The film has received positive retrospective assessments. In 2013, Amrah Ashraf of the Hindustan Times described Raat as the scariest film he had seen and compared Ram Gopal Varma's later Bhoot (2003) to a more restrained reworking of it.

A 2025 retrospective by Scroll.in praised the film's writing, pacing, performances, use of close-ups, silence and jump scares, describing it as a tightly constructed horror film.

== Legacy ==
Raat has been credited with helping shift Hindi horror cinema away from the Gothic settings and creature-centred films associated with earlier low-budget productions. A 2025 retrospective by Scroll.in described the film as a bridge between the horror films associated with the Ramsay Brothers and the more polished, mainstream horror thrillers that subsequently emerged in Indian cinema.

Film scholar Šarūnas Paunksnis has discussed Raat as an early example of the use of haunted urban and domestic spaces in modern Hindi horror cinema, a tendency later developed in films including Varma's Bhoot (2003).

== See also ==
- List of multilingual Indian films
- Pan-Indian film
