= Gautham Raju =

Indian film actor

- Occupation: Actor
- Years active: 1984-present
- Spouse: Jhansi
- Children: 3

Gautham Raju is an Indian actor who predominantly acts in Telugu films. He acted in more than 200 films. He received the Rajababu award.

== Early and personal life ==
His son Krishna also entered the film industry.

== Career ==
He moved to Hyderabad in search of a job. He was also trying to get a chance in films because of his interest in acting. He made his debut as an actor with the film Vasantha Geetam starring Akkineni Nageswara Rao. Later he acted in Sri Katna Leelalu, Coolie No.1, Gharana Mogudu gave him a good break.

== Filmography ==
- Vasantha Geetam (1984)
- Ananda Bhairavi (1984)
- Brahma Rudrulu (1986)
- Yugakartalu (1987)
- Ramu (1987)
- Indrudu Chandrudu (1989)
- Bava Bava Panneeru (1989)
- Vijay (1989)
- Yuvabharatam (1990)
- Chevilo Puvvu (1990)
- Kobbari Bondam (1991)
- Manchi Roju (1991)
- Coolie No. 1 (1991)
- Ashwini (1991)
- Gharana Mogudu (1992) as Yousuf
- Babai Hotel (1992)
- Hello Darling (1992)
- President Gari Pellam (1992)
- Chinna Alludu (1993)
- Aadarsham (1993)
- Tholi Muddu (1993)
- Aarambham (1993)
- Varasudu (1993)
- Rajendrudu Gajendrudu (1993)
- Akka Pettanam Chelleli Kapuram (1993)
- Bangaru Bullodu (1993)
- Rowdy Gari Teacher (1993)
- Andaru Andare (1994)
- S. P. Parasuram (1994)
- Hello Alludu (1994)
- Bangaru Mogudu (1994)
- Hello Brother (1994)
- Pokiri Raja (1995)
- Maato Pettukoku (1995)
- Adavi Dora (1995)
- Miss 420 (1995)
- Khaidi Inspector (1995) as Constable
- Sisindri (1995)
- Vinodam (1996)
- Akka! Bagunnava? (1996)
- Egire Paavurama (1997)
- Aahvaanam (1997)
- Priyamaina Srivaru (1997)
- Nayanamma (1997)
- Kaliyugamlo Gandaragolam (1997)
- Thoka Leni Pitta (1997)
- Dongaata (1997)
- Vammo Vatto O Pellaamo (1997)
- Oka Chinna Maata (1997)
- Pattukondi Chuddam (1997)
- Super Heroes (1997)
- Ugadi (1997)
- Aahaa..! (1998)
- Daddy Daddy (1998)
- Sreevarante Maavare (1998)
- Ooyala (1998)
- Manasichi Choodu (1998)
- Allari Pellam (1998)
- Subhalekhalu (1998)
- Pape Naa Pranam (1998)
- Auto Driver (1998)
- Manasulo Maata (1999)
- Veedu Samanyudu Kadhu (1999)
- Preminche Manasu (1999)
- Alludugaru Vachcharu (1999)
- Premaku Velayera (1999)
- Seenu (1999)
- Raja (1999)
- Hello...Yama! (1999)
- Kodanda Ramudu (2000)
- Sardukupodaam Randi (2000)
- Ganapathi (2000)
- Maa Pelliki Randi (2000)
- Choosoddaam Randi (2000)
- Manasichanu (2000)
- Ee Tharam Nehru (2000) as Panthulu
- Bachi (2000)
- Vijayaramaraju (2000)
- Budget Padmanabham (2001)
- Pandanti Samsaram (2001)
- Bhalevadivi Basu (2001)
- Narahari (2001)
- Snehamante Idera (2001)
- Muthyam (2001)
- Seema Simham (2002)
- Malli Malli Choodali (2002)
- Nee Thodu Kavali (2002)
- Kalusukovalani (2002)
- Tappu Chesi Pappu Koodu (2002)
- Vachina Vaadu Suryudu (2002)
- Pilisthe Palukutha (2002)
- Jodi No.1 (2003)
- Juniors (2003)
- Villain (2003)
- Satta (2003)
- Kabaddi Kabaddi (2003)
- Amma Nanna O Tamila Ammayi (2003)
- Ottesi Cheputunna (2003)
- Athade Oka Sainyam (2004)
- Anandamanandamaye (2004)
- Malliswari (2004)
- Donga Dongadi (2004)
- Shankar Dada MBBS (2004)
- Aaptudu (2004)
- Keelu Gurram (2005)
- Soggadu (2005)
- Guru (2005)
- Modati Cinema (2005)
- Allare Allari (2006)
- Desamuduru (2007)
- Maharathi (2007)
- Swagatam (2008)
- Bujjigadu (2008)
- Ready (2008)
- Kathanayakudu (2008)
- King (2008)
- Mesthri (2009)
- Pistha (2009)
- Neramu Siksha (2009)
- Ek Niranjan (2009)
- Maa Nanna Chiranjeevi (2010)
- Sab Ki Boltee Bandh (2011)
- Dookudu (2011)
- Julayi (2012)
- Chammak Challo (2013) (uncredited)
- Baadshah (2013)
- Something Something (2013)
- Chinna Cinema (2013)
- 1000 Abaddalu (2013)
- Bunny n Cherry (2013)
- Bhimavaram Bullodu (2014)
- Aagadu (2014)
- S/O Satyamurthy (2015)
- Pataas (2015)
- Supreme (2016)
- Krishna Gaadi Veera Prema Gaadha (2016)
- Khaidi No. 150 (2017)
- Raja the Great (2017)
- Ego (2018)
- Kalki (2019)
- Gaddalakonda Ganesh (2019)
- Oorantha Anukuntunnaru (2019)
- Tenali Ramakrishna BA. BL (2019)
- Sita Ramam (2022)
- Meter (2023)
- Maa Awara Zindagi (2023)
- Natho Nenu (2023)
- Mr. Bachchan (2024)
- Kali (2024)
- Viswam (2024)
- Thalli Manasu (2025)
- Viraatapalem (2025)
