= Sundeep Malani =

Indian director, documentary film maker, screenplay writer and actor

Sandeep Malani
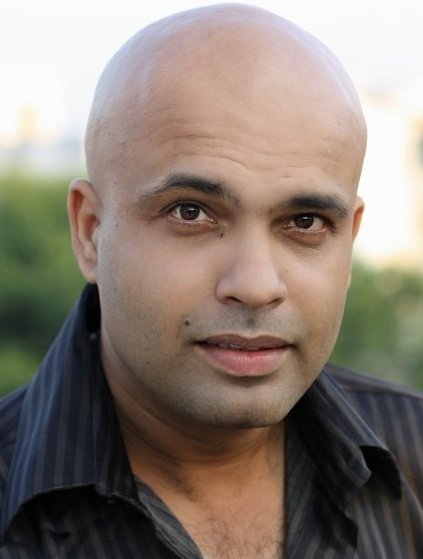
- Born: Sandeep Malani; 19 November 1971 (age 54); Mumbai, Maharashtra
- Occupations: Film director; film actor; screenwriter; documentary film maker; choreographer; film critic
- Years active: 1991–present

Sandeep Malani (born 19 November 1971) is an Indian film director, screenwriter, and actor. He is the managing director of the production company 'Malani Talkies'.

== Early years ==
Sandeep Malani was born in 1971 to a Roman Catholic family in Mumbai and was raised in Mangalore. Malani himself did his early schooling at the Milagres School in Mangalore. and his BBM at SDM College. Later he did Journalism course at Sandesha, Mangalore. Has been trained Japanese and speaks most of the Indian languages. His mother tongue is Konkani. Malani was a choreographer and a dancer. He organised various events in Mangalore during 1992 to 1996 - all successful under the name 'Malani Presents - Something Special' Malani was a film journalist for The Canara Times, Mangalore and later for a few years in The Times of India, Bangalore. He also was a freelancer film critic for various websites and magazines.

Malani co-directed the Kannada film, Miss California, which was the debut film of actor Diganth.

He has variously served as a TV host for local Mangalorean channels, events organiser, costume designer and directed a few music videos for local channels involving dancers and stage artistes of Mangalore. Malani has acted in a few theatre plays as well.

Malani co-directed the Kannada version of the Tamil film One Two Three starring Prabhu Deva, Raju Sundaram, Prasad and Jyothika. The film was directed by K Subaash.

Sandeep Malani directed the Bollywood Film, 'Woh 5 Din' a suspense thriller shot in Barielly and Nainital with newcomers. Later he directed Kalpana Pandit, Akash Hora and Anant Nag in 'Janleva 555'.

As a Screenwriter, Malani has assisted K Subaash in the writing of Rohit Shetty's film Chennai Express and also wrote the script of 'Hello India' starring Akshay Kumar.

Malani has also been a part of the direction team in Onir's I Am anthology film, working on the "I Am Abhimanyu" and "I Am Omar" segments.

He has directed a variety of short films, some of them covering controversial issues such as AIDS ("Jo Jo Laali – a heart wrenching lullaby") and homosexuality ("Shaayad"). His other short film was made in three languages: "Hum Tum Aur Loan" (Hindi), "Yella Ok, Loan Yaake" (Kannada) and "A Loanly Life" (English).

== Filmography (as director) ==
=== Feature films ===
Year	Film	Language	Other notes
1995	1995 A Dance Story	English	Director and Choreographer
2006	SMS 6260	Kannada	
2011	Woh 5 Din	Hindi	
2012	Janleva 555	Hindi	
2014	Sulige Sikkidaaga	Kannada	
2017	Yeh CineMaa Hai	Hindi	

=== Short films ===
Year	Film	Language	Other notes
2010	"Albatross – a flying tale"	English	Director
2010	"Moments"	Hindi	Director
2010	"Jo Jo Laali – a heart wrenching lullaby"	Kannada	Director
2010	"Hum Tum Aur Loan"	Hindi	Director
2010	"Shaayad"	English	Director
2012	"Jojo Darling"	Hindi	Director

=== Documentaries ===
Year	Film	Language	Other notes
2005	Fun With Language	Japanese	Director
2010	LMAI – The Evolution	English	Director
2014	Roop Ki Rani Sridevi	Hindi Musical	Director
2014	YashRaj Heroines De Jayenge	Hindi Musical	Director
2018	Sridevi Lives Forever	English	Director

== Selected filmography (as actor) ==
- Note: all films are in Kannada, unless otherwise noted.

Year	Film	Role	Other notes
1993	Bangar Patler		Tulu films
1995	September 8		Tulu films
1997	Bogsanhe	Hotel Owner's son	Konkani film
1999	Aryabhata		
1999	Z		
2000	Indradhanush		Guest in a song
2000	Swalpa Adjust Madkolli		
2002	123	Boss	Tamil film Also Assistant Director
2002	Manasella Neene	Venu's Friend	Also Assistant Director
2005	Jootata	Hotel Owner	
2006	Padri		Konkani film; Guest in a song
2006	Miss California	Temple Priest	Also Co-director
2006	SMS 6260	Guest College Lecturer / God (voice)	Also Director
2007	Masala	Scientist	Konkani film
2007	Tirupathi	Judge	
2007	Julie	Boss	
2007	C/o Footpath	Artist	
2009	Kazar		Konkani film
2015	Dhand	Doctor	Tulu film
2017	MAA:yeh cine-maa hai		Hindi film
2018	Iruvudellava Bittu		
2018	Darpana	Doctor Eeshwar	
2018	Abhaya Hastha	Dancer	
2018	Huttadha Sutha	Gangster	
2018	Mookavismitha	Hiriyanna	
2023	The Vacant House	Mahesh	Kannada-Konkani bilingual film
2024	Marigold		
