= Recce (TV series) =

Indian Telugu-language crime thriller series

- Genre: Crime thriller
- Developed by: Poluru Krishna
- Screenplay by: Poluru Krishna
- Directed by: Poluru Krishna
- Starring: Sriram; Siva Balaji; Dhanya Balakrishna; Aadukalam Naren; Ester Noronha
- Music by: Sriram Maddury
- Country of origin: India
- Original language: Telugu
- No. of seasons: 1
- No. of episodes: 7

Production
- Executive producer: Akhil Konakalla
- Producer: K. V. Sriram
- Cinematography: Ram K. Mahesh
- Editor: Anil Kumar Pasala
- Running time: 22–30 minutes
- Production company: South Indian Screens

Original release
- Network: ZEE5
- Release: 17 June 2022

Recce is an Indian Telugu-language crime-thriller web series directed by Poluru Krishna. It featured Sriram, Siva Balaji, Dhanya Balakrishna, Saranya Pradeep, Rajashree, Aadukalam Naren and Ester Noronha in main roles. Recce premiered on 17 June 2022 on ZEE5. As of 22 June 2022, it has 40 million streaming minutes.

== Synopsis ==
In 1992, in Tadipatri of Andhra Pradesh, a son consumed by greed and lust hires people to kill his own father and ends up falling to his own demise. S.I Lenin who investigates these murders uncovers the underbelly of familial relationships that when consumed by jealousy, lust and greed, even families can turn lethal.

== Cast ==
- Sriram as Lenin
- Siva Balaji as Chalapathi
- Dhanya Balakrishna as Gouri
- Aadukalam Naren as Varadarajulu
- Ester Noronha as Rekha
- Jeeva as MLA Guruva Reddy
- Saranya Pradeep as Bujjamma
- Rajashree as Devakamma
- Ramaraju as Ranganayakulu
- Thotapalli Madhu as Kullayappa
- Sameer as Police Officer
- Sammeta Gandhi as Paradesi
- Uma Daanam Kumar as Basha
- Krishna Kanth Subbadu
- Murali Basava
- Surya Theja as E.O
- Mani Nallanji
- Koteshwar Rao as S.P. Sanjay
- Swami Naidu Constable Swami
- Prabhavathi Constable Swami's Wife

== Episodes ==
No.	Title	Directed by	Written by	Original release date
1	"The Contract"	Poluru Krishna	Poluru Krishna	17 June 2022
2	"The Sketch"	Poluru Krishna	Poluru Krishna	17 June 2022
3	"The Betrayal"	Poluru Krishna	Poluru Krishna	17 June 2022
4	"The Twist"	Poluru Krishna	Poluru Krishna	17 June 2022
5	"The Clue"	Poluru Krishna	Poluru Krishna	17 June 2022
6	"The Reveal"	Poluru Krishna	Poluru Krishna	17 June 2022
7	"The Revenge"	Poluru Krishna	Poluru Krishna	17 June 2022

== Release ==
Recce was premiered on ZEE5 on 17 June 2022.

== Reception ==
The Times of India gave a rating of 3.5 out of 5 and stated that "Poluru Krishna, who also worked on story adaptation, screenplay and dialogues, did a fabulous job narrating this bold and gripping crime thriller". 123Telugu opined that Recce is "one of the finest political crime thrillers with some decent performances, and excellent background score". Satya Pulagam of ABP Nadu appreciated cinematography, background score and screenplay by Poluru Krishna.
