= SMS 6260 =

Indian Kanglish language drama film

- VCD cover
- Directed by: Sundeep Malani
- Written by: Dialogues: Sandeep Malani; Mohan Shankar; Dilip Malani
- Screenplay by: Dilip Malani
- Story by: Sundeep Malani
- Produced by: Prahalad Arasu; Janu Arasu
- Starring: Diganth; Janu Arasu; Arjun; Smrti; Kiran; Badri; Danny; Karan; Karen; Sony
- Cinematography: M. Selvam
- Edited by: Sanjeeva Reddy
- Music by: Michael Dayao; Dr. Ravi Dattatreya; Lokesh-Prakash
- Release date: 2 February 2007
- Country: India
- Languages: Kannada; English

SMS 6260 is a 2007 Indian (Note: Although the film's CBFC certificate states that the film is Kannada, much of the film is in English.) drama film written and directed by Sundeep Malani. The film features an ensemble cast of Diganth, Janu, Arjun, Smrti, Kiran, Badri, Danny, Karan, Karen, and Sony. The film was released to mixed reviews and ran for fifty days.

== Cast ==
- Diganth Manchale as Roshan
- Janu as Janu
- Arjun as Mahesh
- Smrti as Tina
- Kiran Srinivas as Kiran
- Badrinath Krishnamurthy as DJ Badri
- Danny as Krishna
- Karan as Karan
- Karen as Chrissy
- Sony as Tressy
- Loy as Lal
- Prithvi as Prithvi
- Dattanna as Dattanna
- Jayalakshmi as Sarojamma
- Amithananda as Jay Darling

== Production ==
The film is directed by Sundeep Malani, who worked as an associate director for Miss California (2006) also starring Diganth and Janu. The film's lead characters talk to each other through SMS. The film also features dialogues spoken in Bengali, Kodava, Gujarati, Hindi, Konkani, Malayalam, Marathi, Punjabi, Tamil, Telugu and Tulu. The film was shot in Bangalore, Mangalore and Mysore.

== Soundtrack ==
The songs are composed by Michael Dayao, which features some English songs. Dr. Ravi Dattatreya and Lokesh-Prakash each composed one song each. The song "Nodamma Hudugi" from Premaloka (1987) was reused in the film.

Track listing
No.	Title	Lyrics	Singer(s)	Length
1.	"Kannada Thayiya Madilalli"	Nagendra Prasad	Narayanan Ravindranarhan, K. S. Chithra	2:10
2.	"Lovers Rhyme"	Michael Dayao	Michael Dayao	3:02
3.	"Nodamma Hudugi"	Hamsalekha	S. P. Balasubrahmanyam, Latha Hamsalekha	5:13
4.	"Shiradi Saibaba Sthuthi"	—	Dr. Jumna Dhanapati	0:34
5.	"The Beautiful You"	Alex Yakolev	Gregory Cortsev, Elena Sylantieva	5:55
6.	"This Is Me"	Michael Dayao	Michael Dayao	2:56
7.	"This Is Me (Club Mix)"	Michael Dayao	Michael Dayao	3:22
8.	"SMS 6260"	—	Instrumental	1:00
9.	"Kannada Thaayiya Madilali"	Nagendra Prasad	Narayanan Ravindranarhan, Eshwar Prakash, Sandeep Malani, K. S. Chithra	5:33
Total length:				29:45

== Reception ==
A critic from Chitraloka.com wrote that "It's a must watch for all the IT sector&software professionals, College youngsters and the class audience - not to forget, the kids of 6 years to the cross over of 60 years too". Film critic R. G. Vijayasarathy of IANS wrote that "Totally SMS 6260 can be a film for the new generation, though qualitatively it could have been improvised".
