= The Vacant House =

Indian thriller film

- Directed by: Ester Noronha
- Written by: Ester Noronha
- Starring: Ester Noronha; Sundeep Malani; Shreyas Chinga
- Cinematography: Narender Goud
- Edited by: Vijay Raj
- Music by: Ester Noronha
- Production company: Janet Noronha Productions
- Release date: 10 November 2023
- Country: India
- Languages: Kannada; Konkani

The Vacant House is a 2023 Indian thriller film directed by Ester Noronha, who co-stars in the film alongside Sundeep Malani and Shreyas Chinga. The film was simultaneously shot in Kannada and Konkani.

== Plot ==
Abslam and Hamed are cousins whose families have been divided by a long-running feud, which the two men have recently brought to an end. During a meeting at a café, Hamed introduces Abslam to Aixa, a young dancer. Abslam soon develops strong feelings for her, allowing his infatuation to interfere with his governmental responsibilities. He eventually asks Aixa to marry him, but discovers that her affections lie with Hamed instead.

== Cast ==
- Ester Noronha as Moha
- Sundeep Malani as Mahesh
- Shreyas Chinga as Manav
- Seema Buthello as Manasa

== Reception ==
Y. Maheswara Reddy of the Bangalore Mirror rated the film 3/5 stars and wrote, "Ester Noronha deserves appreciation for handling too many assignments". A. Sharadhaa of The New Indian Express rated the film 2.5/5 stars and wrote, "Despite its flaws, The Vacant House hints at Noronha's potential as a filmmaker, leaving room for growth and improvement in her future endeavours".
