= 123 (film) =

- DVD cover
- Directed by: K. Subash
- Based on: All the Best by Devendra Pem
- Produced by: B. Kumar
- Starring: Prabhu Deva; Jyothika; Raju Sundaram; Nagendra Prasad
- Cinematography: Y. N. Murali
- Edited by: Krishnamoorthy-Siva
- Music by: Deva
- Production company: Sidhesh Films
- Release date: 1 June 2002
- Running time: 127 minutes
- Country: India
- Language: Tamil

123 is a 2002 Indian Tamil-language romantic comedy film directed by K. Subash. It was partially reshot in Telugu and Kannada. The film stars real-life brothers Prabhu Deva, Raju Sundaram, and Nagendra Prasad alongside Jyothika as the female lead, while Deva composed the film's music. Based on the Marathi play All The Best by Devendra Pem, 123 was released on 1 June 2002.

== Plot ==
Three men with physical disabilities lead dull and monotonous lives. However, when Narmada, a young woman, befriends them, they start incorporating many positive changes.

== Cast ==
- Prabhu Deva as Tirupathi, the blind (1)
- Raju Sundaram as Pazhani, the deaf (2)
- Nagendra Prasad as Chidambaram, the mute (3)
- Jyothika as Narmada
- Ishari Ganesh as Auto Driver
- Karunas as Thief Aalavandhan
- Uttej as Thief Rangarayudu (Telugu version)
- Komal Kumar as Thief Kotigobba (Kannada version)
- Sundeep Malani as Boss
- Pandu as Hotelier
- Mohan Raman as Ad film actor
- Abhinayashree as Jyothi
- Laxmi Ratten as Company MD
- Sridhar (Special appearance in the song "Kanchivaram Povom")
- Shobi (Special appearance in the song "Kanchivaram Povom")
- Japan Kumar (Special appearance in the song "Kanchivaram Povom")

== Production ==
In December 2001, the three sons of prominent dance choreographer Mugur Sundar were reported to be coming together to star in the Tamil film, and while Prabhu Deva was an established actor and Raju Sundaram had also appeared in films, it became the first substantial role for Nagendra Prasad. Karunas was selected to play a key role, while Sundaram was reported to be a choreographer in the film, which would be based on the Marathi play All the Best by Devendra Pem. The mouth freshener brand, Pass Pass, teamed up with the film to put product placement into the venture. Uttej and Komal Kumar replaced Karunas in the partially reshot Telugu and Kannada versions, respectively.

== Soundtrack ==
The soundtrack was composed by Deva. Sandeep Chowta was initially expected to be the film's composer.

Tamil
No.	Title	Lyrics	Singer(s)	Length
1.	"Adada Nadandhu Varaa"	Victor	Shankar Mahadevan, Anuradha Sriram	3:16
2.	"April Mazhai"	Thamarai	Anuradha Sriram	5:42
3.	"Hey Penne"	Kalaikumar	Suresh Peters, Unni Menon, Karthik, Madhangi	5:42
4.	"Kanchivaram Povom"	Deva	Mano, Baby Vaishali, Prabhu Deva, K. Subash, YSD Sekar	5:24
5.	"Un Perai"	Kalaikumar	Karthik, Mathangi	5:15
6.	"Konjum Konjum"	Kalaikumar	Suresh Peters, Anuradha Sriram	5:42

Kannada
No.	Title	Lyrics	Singer(s)	Length
1.	"Tunturu Male Meghave"	V. Nagendra Prasad	Anuradha Sriram	5:42
2.	"Bandalo Rubber Bombe"	K. Kalyan	Shankar Mahadevan, Anuradha Sriram	3:16
3.	"Chamundi Bettakke"		Mano, Vaishali	5:24
4.	"One Two Three"	V. Nagendra Prasad	A. R. Reihana	3:30
5.	"Ninna Hesaru"	V. Nagendra Prasad	Suresh Peters, Mathangi, Unni Menon, Karthik	5:15
6.	"Thabbikolli"	V. Nagendra Prasad	Suresh Peters, Anuradha Sriram	5:42

== Release and reception ==
The film opened on 1 June 2002.

Tamil version

Malathi Rangarajan of The Hindu noted "it is a tightrope walk for director K. Subhash because presenting physical impairment without hurting sentiments is not easy. And the director does come out unscathed. Much of it is situational humour and the dialogue, again by Subhash, accentuates the comic impact in some of the scenes". Visual Dasan of Kalki called the film a torture. Cinesouth called it "the best example for an average film". Malini Mannath of Chennai Online wrote, "Characters, each with a physical disability, the handicaps used as the basis of comedy. The audience knowing what's happening, but the characters oblivious to it, re-acting or talking at tangents. But unfortunately director Subhash misses out on taking full advantage of the scenario. The laughs are few and far between. And whenever the director tries to pep up his proceedings by a little diversion, like the comic capers of Karunas, or the antics of the enticing Abhinayasri, the scenes fall flat".

Telugu version

Jeevi of Idlebrain.com gave the film two stars, stating "The only strength of the film is situation comedy based on the disabilities of three protagonists. Otherwise it's an avoidable film". The reviewer added that "The producers of this film tried to dupe Telugu audience by projecting '1-2-3' as the first Jyothika's Telugu straight film. But its yet another routine dubbing film rubbed on Telugu audience". Gudipoodi Srihari of The Hindu cited "The film keeps grip on the audience, because of the curiosity the subject kicks up, regarding the survival of the handicapped using their sixth sense. The characters are difficult to portray, but the three main artistes do it convincingly".
