= Ester Noronha =

Indian actress and singer (born 1992)

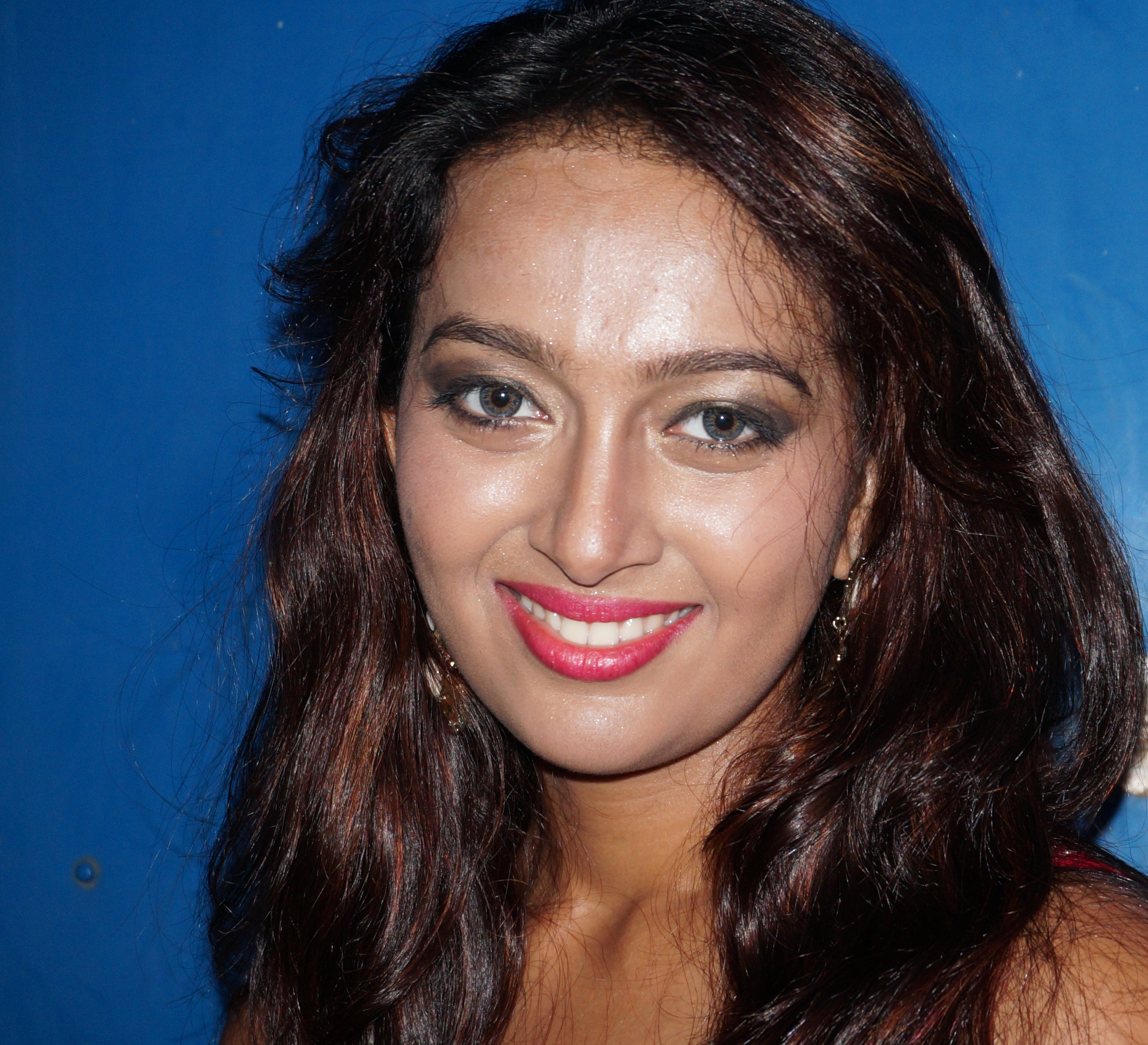
- Noronha in 2018
- Born: Ester Valerie Noronha; Kapu, Karnataka
- Occupation: Actress
- Years active: 2012–present
- Spouse: Noel Sean (m. 2019; div. 2020)

Ester Valerie Noronha is an Indian actress and director, who works in Telugu, Kannada, Hindi, and Konkani films. She is known for her roles in Bhimavaram Bullodu (2014), Shakeela (2020), Lanke (2021), Sophiya, and the crime thriller series Recce (2022).

== Personal life ==
Noronha married singer and rapper Noel Sean in January 2019 after being engaged for a year. On 31 October 2020, they made it public on social media that they had been officially divorced after being separated for a year.

== Career ==
She was cast by director Teja in his Telugu film 1000 Abaddalu (2013). Noronha was immediately signed for Bhimavaram Bullodu opposite Sunil.

== Filmography ==
Year	Title	Role	Language(s)	Notes
2012	Baromas		Hindi	
2012	Mr. Money		Hindi	
2012	Qayamat Hi Qayamat	Rani	Hindi	
2013	1000 Abaddalu	Satya	Telugu	
2014	Bhimavaram Bullodu	Nandini	Telugu	
2014	Usiriginta Neene Attira		Kannada	
2014	Naavika		Kannada	
2015	Jugari		Tulu	
2015	Nagrik		Hindi	
2015	Maajhi Aashiqui		Marathi	
2016	Garam		Telugu	Special appearance
2016	Nosibacho Khell	Sophia	Konkani	
2016	Meen Kuzhambum Mann Paanaiyum		Tamil	Special appearance
2017	Sophiya – A Dream Girl		Konkani	
2017	Jaya Janaki Nayaka	Manasa	Telugu	
2017	Athiratha		Kannada	Special appearance
2017	Nuggekai		Kannada	
2017	Juliet Lover of Idiot		Telugu	Special appearance
2018	Nayanam		Telugu	
2019	Kantaar		Konkani	
2020	Shakeela	Suhana	Hindi	
2021	Lanke		Kannada	
2022	Iravatham	Maya	Telugu	
2022	69 Sanskaar Colony		Telugu	
2022	DNA		Kannada	
2022	Local Train		Kannada	
2022	Hawayein	Veronica	Hindi	
2023	Changure Bangaru Raja	Varam	Telugu	
2023	Inamdar	Silku	Kannada	
2023	The Vacant House	Moha	Kannada; Konkani	Also director, music director and costume designer
2023	Devil: The British Secret Agent	Rani	Telugu	
2024	Tenant	Esther	Telugu	
2025	Thala		Telugu	
2025	Game of Loans		Tamil	
2026	'Amaravathiki Aahwanam'	Rajeswari	Telugu	

=== Television ===
Year	Title	Role	Network	Language(s)
2022	Recce	Rekha	ZEE5	Telugu
