= Narahari =

Narahari is a name. Notable people with the name include:

- Narahari Acharya, Nepalese politician
- Narahari Haldankar, Indian politician
- Narahari Mahato, Indian politician
- Narahari Sarkar, Bengali poet
- Narahari Sonar, Indian poet
- Narahari Tirtha (c. 1243- c. 1333), Dvaita philosopher
- K. Narahari, Indian politician
- Parikipandla Narahari (born 1975), Indian civil servant
- V. Narahari Rao, Indian civil servant
- Garikapati Narahari Sastry, Indian chemist
