= Mathivanan Rajendran =

Indian actor and film producer

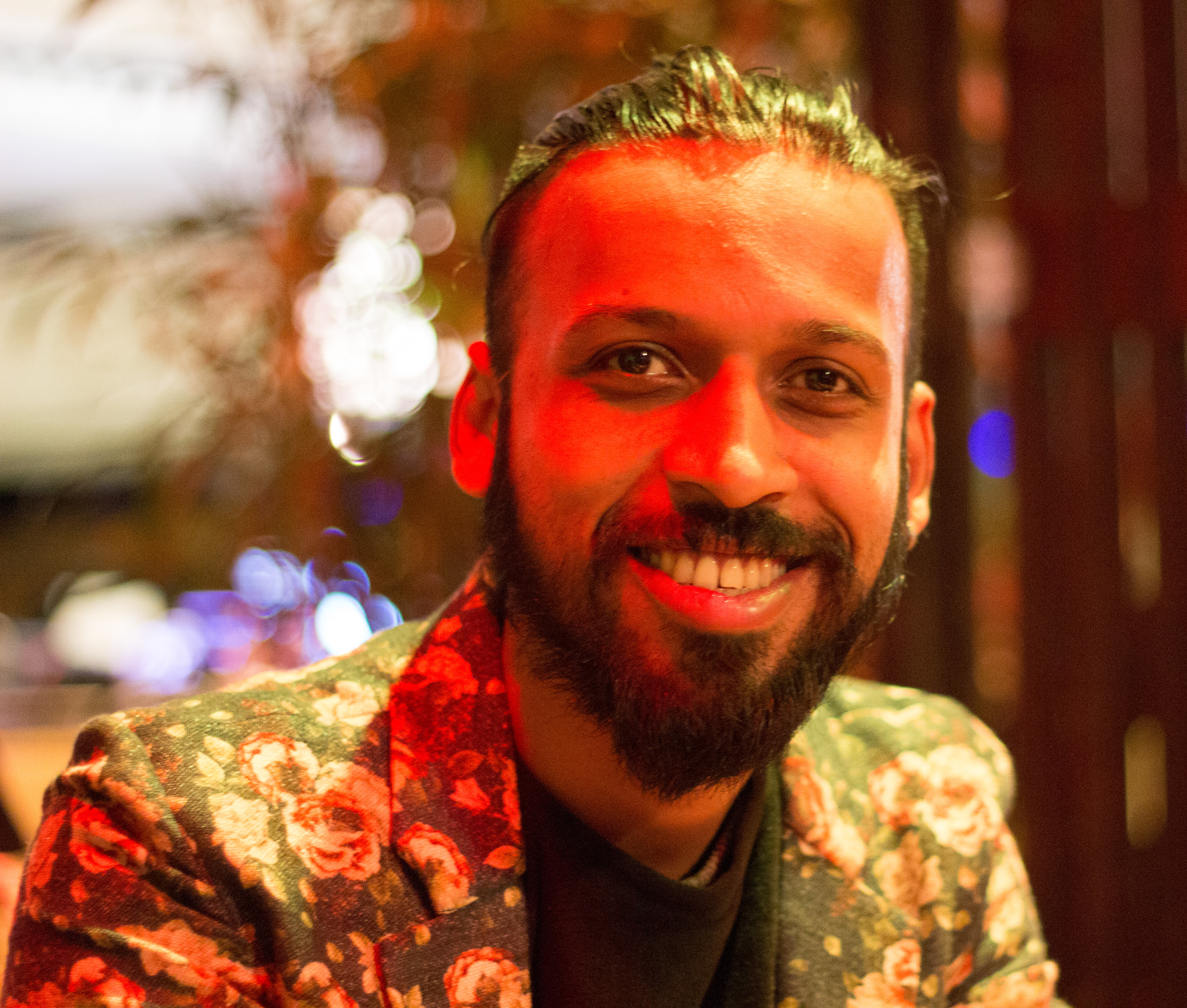
- Mathivanan at the 2020 International Film Festival Rotterdam
- Born: Pudukkottai, India
- Education: Virginia Tech
- Occupations: Film producer; Actor; Stage Director
- Years active: 2011-present

Mathivanan Rajendran (born 12 January) is an Indian media entrepreneur, film producer and actor.

== Career ==
Rajendran’s work spans film, theater, and digital media.His 2020 Tamil-language production, Nasir, premiered at the International Film Festival of Rotterdam, where it was nominated for the Tiger Award and won the NETPAC Award for Best Asian Film. The film also received the FIPRESCI Best Indian Film and was featured at the New Directors/New Films Festival at the Museum of Modern Art (MoMA) in New York. Additionally, Nasir was included in the *British Film Institute’s list of 10 Great Modern Indian Independent Films' underscoring its global recognition.

Rajendran’s portfolio includes Humans in the Loop and Taak, two short films exploring themes of artificial intelligence and surveillance, respectively. Developed under the Museum of Imagined Futures (MOIF), an initiative connecting speculative storytelling with social relevance, these films were supported by the Omidyar Network India. Humans in the Loop was showcased at the Mumbai Academy of the Moving Image (MAMI) and the International Film Festival of Kerala (IFFK), while Taak (Tracker) premiered at Mumbai Academy of the Moving Image (MAMI) and featured at the Dharamshala International Film Festival (DIFF).

Rajendran’s production credits also include Nirvana Inn, a psychological drama supported by the Asian Cinema Fund (ACF), which premiered at the Busan International Film Festival and earned acclaim for its atmospheric exploration of guilt and redemption. B. Selvi and Daughters, supported by GIZ, received three Critics' Choice nominations for its portrayal of women entrepreneurs in Tamil Nadu.

In 2024, Rajendran launched Earthbound/100, a platform aimed at developing 100 socially impactful media projects. Supported by the Mantra Foundation, the initiative focuses on blending storytelling with measurable social outcomes, positioning media as a tool for systemic change. He also established the root.ax accelerator, a transmedia program fostering collaboration among creators in film, digital media, and immersive storytelling.

In addition to film, Rajendran co-founded Rascalas, a platform amplifying South Indian narratives. He produced Black Sheep.(2016), one of South India’s pioneering web series, known for its relatable and humorous take on urban youth culture. His theatrical work has been internationally recognized, with productions staged at the National Arts Festival in South Africa and the Hollywood Fringe Festival in the United States. These works blend regional narratives with universal themes, earning critical acclaim for their innovative storytelling.

As an actor, Rajendran has appeared in films such as Mayakkam Enna (2011), Sawaari (2016), Andhra Mess (2018), and Freddie's Piano (2020),

== Recognition and Background ==
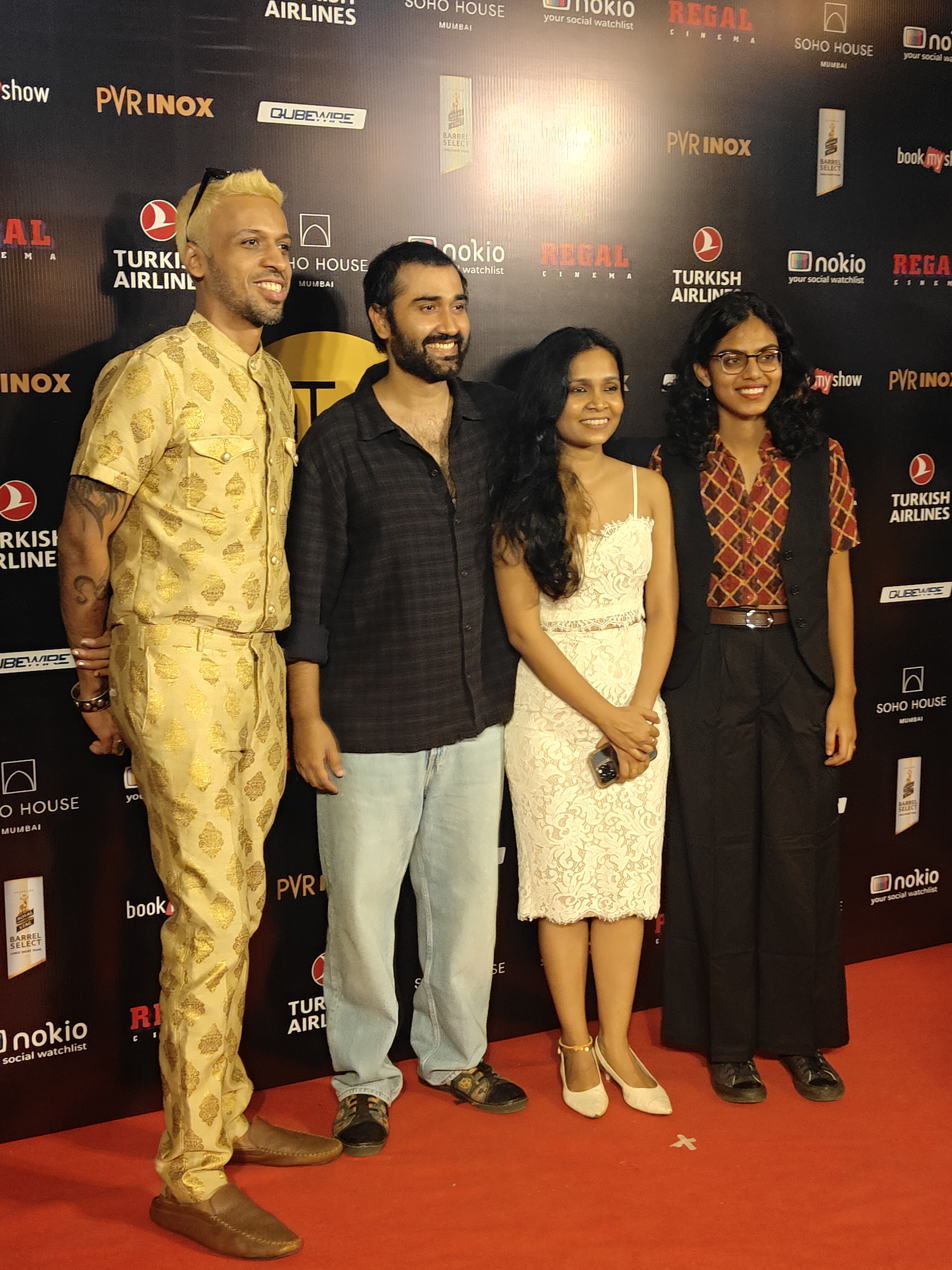
Mathivanan Rajendran at the premiere of Humans in the Loop at MAMI 2024

In 2022, he was named as a BAFTA Breakthrough Talent from India., a distinction recognizing exceptional contributions to film, games, and television. He holds a Masters degree in Industrial and Systems Engineering from Virginia Tech, which informs his analytical approach to storytelling and production. Through Stray Factory, Storiculture, and initiatives like Earthbound/100 and the root.ax accelerator, he continues to champion innovative narratives that explore social, cultural, and technological themes, advancing the role of media in creating global impact.

== Filmography ==
=== As producer ===
Year	Title	Language	Director	Notes
2016	Black Sheep	English/Tamil	Naveen Kumar	Web Series
2019	Nirvana Inn	Hindi	Vijay Jayapal	24th Busan International Film Festival 2019
2020	Nasir	Tamil	Arun Karthick	Winner NETPAC Award International Film Festival of Rotterdam FIPRESCI Best Indian Film Andrei Tarkovsky International film festival - Zerkalo - Grand Prix Winner
2020	B.Selvi & Daughters	Tamil	Drishya	Critics Choice Awards for Best Actress, Best Director & Best Film
2020	Freddies Piano	English	Aakash	
2020	The Tremor	Tamil	Balaji Vembu Chelli	Festival du nouveau cinéma
2024	Humans in the Loop	Hindi	Aranya Sahay	International Film Festival of Kerala 2024 Mumbai Academy of the Moving Image 2024
2024	Taak	Hindi	Udit Khurana	
2025	Aanaikatti Blues	Tamil	Arun Karthick	

=== As actor ===
Year	Film	Role	Language
2011	Mayakkam Enna	Shankar	Tamil
2016	Sawaari	Mathi	Tamil
2018	Andhra Mess	Ritchie	Tamil
2019	Freddies Piano		English
2020	The Discreet Charm of the Savarnas		English

=== As voice actor ===
Year	Film	Role	Language	Notes
2013	Vishwaroopam	Deepak Chatterjee	Tamil	
