= Stray Factory =

Indian Independent entertainment company

- Type: Private
- Industry: Entertainment
- Founded: July 2010
- Founder: Mathivanan Rajendran
- Headquarters: Chennai, Tamil Nadu, India
- Key people: Venkatesh Harinathan Rajiv Rajaram
- Products: Films, Performing Arts
- Services: Film production

Stray Factory is an Indian Independent entertainment company founded on July 17, 2010 by Mathivanan Rajendran as a performing arts company before diversifying into online media in 2014 and independent film in 2017. Upcoming films include Nirvana Inn (2019) & Nasir (2020).

== Overview ==
=== 2010–2014: Theatre and early years ===
After a few scripted plays, the company made a departure from traditional scripted work to devised theatre. The first of which was seen in their 2011 production of Great Indian Blogologues which took blogs from the public and adapted them to the stage.

Stray Factory's biggest achievements have been in the short format, particularly at International Short and Sweet festivals, notable plays include My Name is Cine-MaCarpouram, Typist with Destiny, Lost Audition, Chairpersons & Maya from Madurai. The group has performed at Short and Sweet Festivals in Sydney, Dubai, Kuala Lumpur and Los Angeles and at other International festivals such as the Auckland Fringe Festival, The Park New Festival of Contemporary Arts, Hollywood Fringe Festival & National Arts Festival in Grahamstown, Kakiseni Theatre Festival in Kuala Lumpur and the Hindu Metroplus Theatre Festival.

In 2016, the group was awarded the Emerging Artist Award at the Short and Sweet Festival in Hollywood, California.

Several Stray Factory have forayed into films, including Pooja Devariya Mathivanan Rajendran, Rajiv Rajaram, Venkatesh Harinathan. Performers who have worked with the group have transitioned to film like Hiphop Tamizha Lakshmi Priyaa Chandramouli, Rishi Raj, Amzath Khan, Ma Ka Pa Anand and Vidyullekha Raman.

Director M. Manikandan developed short theatre scenes by improvising with the group and represented a fictional version of the group in Andavan Kattalai.

=== 2014–2017: Youtube and webseries ===
Stray Factory launched Rascalas on YouTube in 2014 in partnership with Culture Machine to focus on South Indian content. The first video was launched on November 4, 2014 and subsequently garnered 2 million views and is widely recognised as the first viral video from South India. In 2016, it produced one of South India's first web series with Black Sheep (2016) and first non-fiction web series, Stray Stories. These shows and other content have been syndicated to several OTT platforms, including YuppTV and TVF Play.

=== 2017–present: Independent film and international co-productions ===
Stray Factory primarily works on International Co-productions, having worked with films attached to the Hubert Bals Fund, Asian Project Market, NFDC co-production market, and BIFAN IT Project. Current films in production are Nasir & Nirvana Inn.

== Filmography ==
=== Series ===
Year	Film	Cast	Creator
2016	Black Sheep	Shyam Renganathan, Janaki Sabesh, Jiva Ravi	Bhargav Prasad

=== Films ===
Year	Film	Director	Cast	Notes
2019	Nirvana Inn	Hindi	Vijay Jayapal	Selection Asian Project Market 2018 Winner Asian Cinema Fund 2019 24th Busan International Film Festival 2019
2020	Nasir	Tamil	Arun Karthick	Selection NFDC Film Bazaar Co-production Market 2017 Hubert Bals Script & Development Fund HBF + NFF Coproduction Grant NETPAC winner International Film Festival of Rotterdam
2020	B.Selvi & Daughters	Tamil	Drishya	Short Film
2019	Freddies Piano	English	Aakash	
2021	Aasaimugam	Tamil	Arun Karthick	
