= 49th International Film Festival Rotterdam =

2020 edition of IFFR

- Opening film: Mosquito by João Nuno Pinto
- Closing film: A Beautiful Day in the Neighborhood by Marielle Heller
- Location: Rotterdam, Netherlands
- Founded: 1972
- Awards: The Cloud In Her Room (Tiger Award)
- Festival date: 22 January–2 February 2020
- Website: iffr.com

IFFR chronology
- 2021 2019

The 49th International Film Festival Rotterdam, the 2020 installment of the International Film Festival Rotterdam, took place on 22 January–2 February 2020.

The Cloud In Her Room by Zheng Lu Xinyuan won the Tiger Award, the top prize.

== Juries ==
=== Ammodo Tiger Short ===
- Nathanja van Dijk, filmmaker
- Safia Benhaim, filmmaker
- Greg de Cuir Jr., film curator and writer

=== Bright Future ===
- Beatriz Navas, director of ICAA Spain
- Zsuzsanna Király, head of development at Komplizen Film
- Michel Lipkes, Mexican filmmaker and director of Festival Internacional de Cine Universidad Nacional Autónoma de México

== Official selection ==
=== Bright Future ===
The section highlighted work of young and emerging filmmakers, consisted of the Tiger competition, Ammodo Tiger Short competition, Bright Future competition, main, mid-length and short programmes.

==== Tiger ====
The following films were selected to compete for the Tiger Award. The line-up was announced on 18 December 2019.

Title	Director(s)	Production countrie(s)
El año del descubrimiento	Luis López Carrasco	Spain, Switzerland
Beasts Clawing at Straws	Kim Yong-hoon	South Korea
The Cloud In Her Room	Zheng Lu Xinyuan	Hong Kong
Desterro	Maria Clara Escobar	Brazil, Portugal, Argentina
Drama Girl	Vincent Boy Kars	Netherlands
La fortaleza	Jorge Thielen Armand	Venezuela, France, Netherlands, Colombia
Kala azar	Janis Rafailidou	Netherlands, Greece
Nasir	Arun Karthick	India, Netherlands
Piedra sola	Alejandro Telemaco Tarraf	Argentina, Mexico, Qatar, United Kingdom
Si yo fuera el invierno mismo	Jazmín López	Argentina

==== Ammodo Tiger Short ====
The following films were selected to compete for the Ammodo Tiger Short Competition. The line-up was announced on 4 December 2019.

Title	Director(s)	Production countrie(s)
3 Logical Exits	Mahdi Fleifel	Denmark, United Kingdom, Lebanon
Aggregate States of Matters	Rosa Barba	Peru, Germany
Apiyemiyekî?	Ana Vaz	France, Netherlands
Apparition	Ismaïl Bahri	France
Aquí y allá	Melisa Liebenthal	France, Argentina
Becoming Alluvium	Thao Nguyen Phan	Vietnam, Spain
Beer	Erik van Lieshout	Netherlands
A Bright Summer Diary	Lei Lei	United States
A chuva acalanta a dor	Leonardo Mouramateus	Portugal, Brazil
Communicating Vessels	Maïder Fortuné, Annie MacDonell	Canada
The Eyes of Summer	Rajee Samarasinghe	Sri Lanka, United States
Look Then Below	Ben Rivers	United Kingdom
The Lost Procession	Bani Abidi	United Arab Emirates, Germany, Pakistan
the names have changed, including my own and truths have been altered	Onyeka Igwe	United Kingdom
Progressive Touch	Michael Portnoy	Austria, Netherlands, United States
Sayōnara	William Andreas Wivel	Denmark
Sun Dog	Dorian Jespers	Belgium
Tendre	Isabel Pagliai	France
They Parlaient Idéale	Laure Prouvost	France, Belgium, Italy
Tyrant Star	Diane Severin Nguyen	Vietnam, United States
Wong Ping's Fables 2	Wong Ping	Hong Kong

==== Bright Future ====
The programme highlighted first feature films by aspiring filmmakers.

In competition

The following films were selected to compete for the Bright Future Award. The line-up was announced on 18 December 2019.

Title	Director(s)	Production countrie(s)
Babai	Artem Aisagaliev	Russia, United States
Chaco	Diego Mondaca	Bolivia, Argentina
Los fantasmas	Sebastián Lojo	Guatemala, Argentina
Fellwechselzeit	Sabrina Mertens	Germany
For the Time Being	Salka Tiziana	Germany, Spain, Switzerland
I Blame Society	Gillian Wallace Horvat	United States
Moving On	Yoon Dan-bin	South Korea
My Mexican Bretzel	Nuria Giménez Lorang	Spain
Ofrenda	Juan María Mónaco Cagni	Argentina
Panquiaco	Ana Elena Tejera	Panama
A Rifle and a Bag	Cristina Hanes, Isabella Rinaldi, Arya Rothe	India
Sebastian springt über Geländer	Ceylan-Alejandro Ataman-Checa	Germany
The Trouble with Nature	Illum Jacobi	Denmark, France
Truth or Consequences	Hannah Jayanti	United States
Wisdow Teeth	Liang Ming	China

Main programme

The programme highlighted cutting-edge work of contemporary filmmakers and a selection of emerging talent.

Title	Director(s)	Production countrie(s)
AIDOL	Lawrence Lek	United Kingdom
Air Condition	Fradique	Angola
Cenote	Oda Kaori	Japan
Damp Season	Gao Ming	China
Death Inhabits at Night	Eduardo Morotó	Brazil
La dosis	Martín Kraut	Argentina
Dwelling in the Fuchun Mountains	Gu Xiaogang	China
En medio del laberinto	Salomón Pérez	Peru
The Fever	Maya Da-Rin	Brazil
L'île aux oiseaux	Maya Kosa, Sérgio da Costa	Switzerland
The Invitation	Saurav Rai	India
Longa noite	Eloy Enciso	Spain
A Love Unknown	John Clang	Singapore
Lusala	Mugambi Nthiga	Kenya
The Magic Mountain	Eitan Efrat, Daniel Mann	Belgium
Make Up	Claire Oakley	United Kingdom
Merry Christmas, Yiwu	Mladen Kovacevic	Sweden
Le miracle du Saint Inconnu	Alaa Eddine Aljem	Morocco
My Morning Laughter	Marko Đorđević	Serbia
Nafi's Father	Mamadou Dia	Senegal
Non c'è nessuna Dark Side (atto uno 2007-2019)	Erik Negro	Italy
The Painter and the Thief	Benjamin Ree	Norway
Phases of Matter	Deniz Tortum	Turkey
The Pregnant Tree and the Goblin	Kim Dongryung, Park Kyoungtae	South Korea
Shell and Joint	Hirabayashi Isamu	Japan
Slow Machine	Paul Felten, Joe DeNardo	United States
Some Kind of Heaven	Lance Oppenheim	United States
Suzanne Daveau	Luísa Homem	Portugal
This Is Not a Burial, It's a Resurrection	Lemohang Jeremiah Mosese	Lesotho
Tierra adentro	Mauro Colombo	Panama
Tlamess	Ala Eddine Slim	Tunisia
The Tree House	Truong Minh Quý	Singapore
VHYes	Jack Henry Robbins	United States
We Are From There	Wissam Tanios	Lebanon

=== Voices ===
The section consisted of:

- Big Screen Competition
- Voices main programme, which showcased the work of future in arthouse cinema,
- Limelight, which showcased international award-winners and festival favourites,
- Rotterdämmerung, which showcased the work in hardcore film genres,
- Scopitone, which showcased music documentaries, and
- Voices Short.

==== Big Screen Competition ====
The following films were selected to compete for the VPRO Big Screen Award. The line-up was announced on 18 December 2019.

Title	Director(s)	Production countrie(s)
El cazador	Marco Berger	Argentina
Eden	Ágnes Kocsis	Hungary, Romania
Énorme	Sophie Letourneur	France
The Evening Hour	Braden King	United States
Fanny Lye Deliver'd	Thomas Clay	United Kingdom, Germany
Mosquito	João Nuno Pinto	Portugal, France, Brazil
A Perfectly Normal Family	Malou Reymann	Denmark
Synapses	Chang Tso-chi	Taiwan
A Yellow Animal	Felipe Bragança	Brazil, Portugal, Mozambique

==== Voices Main Programme ====
The programme highlighted the work of future in arthouse cinema.

Title	Director(s)	Production countrie(s)
All This Victory	Ahmad Ghossein	Lebanon
Antigone	Sophie Deraspe	Canada
BattleScar – Punk Was Invented by Girls	Nico Casavecchia, Martin Allais	France
Birds (Or How to Be One)	Babis Makridis	Greece
Bitter Chestnut	Gurvinder Singh	India
Black Bag	Shao Qing	China
Children of the Sea	Ayumu Watanabe	Japan
Il colpo del cane	Fulvio Risuleo	Italy
Cook, F**k, Kill	Mira Fornay	Czech Republic
A Dark, Dark Man	Adilkhan Yerzhanov	Kazakhstan
Emilia	César Sodero	Argentina
Fidelity	Nigina Sayfullaeva	Russia
Gaadi	Prasanna Vithanage	Sri Lanka
Happy Old Year	Nawapol Thamrongrattanarit	Thailand
A linha	Ricardo Laganaro	Brazil
The Longest Day	Jonas Selberg Augustsén	Sweden
Los que vuelven	Laura Casabé	Argentina
The Making of [5x1]	Midi Z	Taiwan
Moffie	Oliver Hermanus	South Africa
The Moneychanger	Federico Veiroj	Uruguay
Mother	Kristof Bilsen	Belgium
Not in This World	Park Jungbum	South Korea
O [5x1]	Qiu Yang	Taiwan
Only You Alone	Zhou Zhou	China
The Orphanage	Shahrbanoo Sadat	Denmark
Parasite (B&W Version)	Bong Joon-ho	South Korea
Passenger	Isobel Knowles, Van Sowerwine	Australia
Rose Stone Star	Marcello Sannino	Italy
The Science of Fictions	Yosep Anggi Noen	Indonesia
South Terminal	Rabah Ameur-Zaïmeche	France
Tenzo	Tomita Katsuya	Japan
Valley of Souls	Nicólas Rincón Gille	Colombia
Vendrá la muerte y tendrá tus ojos	José Luis Torres Leiva	Chile
White on White	Théo Court	Spain
A Witness Out of the Blue	Andrew Fung	Hong Kong
You Know Him	Ercan Kesal	Turkey
You Will Die at Twenty	Amjad Abu Alala	Sudan
Zombi Child	Bertrand Bonello	France

==== Limelight ====
The programme showcased international award-winners and festival favourites.

Title	Director(s)	Production countrie(s)
Adam	Maryam Touzani	Morocco
Adoration	Fabrice Du Welz	Belgium
Atlantics	Mati Diop	Senegal
Atlantis	Valentyn Vasyanovych	Ukraine
Babyteeth	Shannon Murphy	Australia
Bacurau	Kleber Mendonça Filho, Juliano Dornelles	Brazil
Balloon	Pema Tseden	China
The Barefoot Emperor	Jessica Woodworth, Peter Brosens	Belgium
Beanpole	Kantemir Balagov	Russia
A Beautiful Day in the Neighborhood	Marielle Heller	United States
Corpus Christi	Jan Komasa	Poland
Deux	Filippo Meneghetti	France
Ema	Pablo Larraín	Chile
Farewell Paradise	Sonja Wyss	Netherlands
Fire Will Come	Oliver Laxe	Spain
Ghost Tropic	Bas Devos	Belgium
A Girl Missing	Kōji Fukada	Japan
Goud	Rogier Hesp	Netherlands
Just 6.5	Saeed Roustayi	Iran
The Lighthouse	Robert Eggers	United States
Little Women	Greta Gerwig	United States
Marona's Fantastic Tale	Anca Damian	France
Matthias & Maxime	Xavier Dolan	Canada
Les Misérables	Ladj Ly	France
Muidhond	Patrice Toye	Belgium
Paradise Drifters	Mees Peijnenburg	Netherlands
The Perfect Candidate	Haifaa al-Mansour	Saudi Arabia
Proxima	Alice Winocour	France
Sibyl	Justine Triet	France
A Son	Mehdi M. Barsaoui	Tunisia
Sound of Metal	Darius Marder	United States
True History of the Kelly Gang	Justin Kurzel	Australia
Uncut Gems	Benny Safdie, Josh Safdie	United States
The Whistlers	Corneliu Porumboiu	Romania
The Wild Goose Lake	Diao Yinan	China
Working Girls	Frédéric Fonteyne, Anne Paulicevich	Belgium

==== Rotterdämmerung ====
The programme showcased the work in hardcore film genres.

Title	Director(s)	Production countrie(s)
Boyz in the Wood	Ninian Doff	United States
Bring Me Home	Kim Seung-woo	South Korea
ColOZio	Artemio Narro	Mexico
Detention	John Hsu	Taiwan
L'état sauvage	David Perrault	France
First Love	Takashi Miike	Japan
Gutterbee	Ulrich Thomsen	Denmark
Impetigore	Joko Anwar	Indonesia
Jallikattu	Lijo Jose Pellissery	India
The Long Walk	Mattie Do	Laos
Saint Maud	Rose Glass	United Kingdom
Special Actors	Ueda Shinichiro	Japan

=== Deep Focus ===
The section highlighted work of compilations, retrospectives and other formats in cinema. The section consisted of:

- Frameworks, which highlighted art films by emerging artists,
- Signatures, which showcased new work of established filmmakers,
- Regained, which showed restored classic films, films about filmmakers, experimental works and installations,
- Beth B: War Is Never Over, which showcased the selection of work about female identity, power and sexuality, curated by Beth B,
- Marion Hänsel, à la vie, which showcased the work of Marion Hänsel, and
- Deep Focus Short, which paid tribute to Kiluanji Kia Henda and Leonardo Mouramateus.

==== Signatures ====
The programme showcased new work of established filmmakers.

Title	Director(s)	Production countrie(s)
Bring Down the Walls	Phil Collins	United States
Il diario di Angela – Noi due cineasti. Capitolo secondo	Yervant Gianikian	Italy
The Doll's Breath	Brothers Quay	United Kingdom
Les enfants d'Isadora	Damien Manivel	France
Un film dramatique	Éric Baudelaire	France
The Halt	Lav Diaz	Philippines
A Hidden Life	Terrence Malick	Germany
How to Overthrow the US Government (Legally)	Caveh Zahedi	United States
Jeanne d'Arc	Bruno Dumont	France
Krabi, 2562	Ben Rivers, Anocha Suwichakornpong	Thailand
Liberté	Albert Serra	France
Little Joe	Jessica Hausner	Austria
No.7 Cherry Lane	Yonfan	Hong Kong
Las poetas visitan a Juana Bignozzi	Laura Citarella, Mercedes Halfon	Argentina
Sandlines	Francis Alÿs	Iraq
Vitalina Varela	Pedro Costa	Portugal

=== Perspectives ===
The section presented the IFFR's thematic programme and showcased the relevant social and political issues in cinema. The section consisted of:

- The Tyger Burns, which presented the contemporary work of old filmmakers,
- Synergetic, which showcased the alternative histories of mainstream narrative in cinema,
- Ordinary Heroes: Made in Hong Kong, which presented the political, social and economic tensions in Hong Kong,
- Sacred Beings, which presented the notion of queer culture, gender fluidity and spiritualities outside the Western perspective, and
- Wait and See, which showcased the work about patience.

== Awards ==
The following awards were presented at the 49th edition:

=== Awards and competition ===
- Tiger Award: The Cloud In Her Room by Zheng Lu Xinyuan
- Special Jury Award: Beasts Clawing at Straws by Kim Yong-hoon
- Ammodo Tiger Short Award:
  - Apparition by Ismaïl Bahri
  - Communicating Vessels by Maïder Fortuné, Annie MacDonell
  - Sun Dog by Dorian Jespers
- Robby Müller Award: Diego García
- Big Screen Competition Award: A Perfectly Normal Family by Malou Reymann
- NETPAC Award: Nasir by Arun Karthick
- Found Footage Award: My Mexican Bretzel by Nuria Giménez Lorang
- IFFR Youth Jury Award: Les Misérables by Ladj Ly

=== Audience Awards ===
- BankGiro Loterij Audience Award: Parasite (B&W Version) by Bong Joon-ho
- Voices Short Award: Tabaski by Laurence Attali

=== Critics Awards ===
- FIPRESCI Award: Only You Alone by Zhou Zhou
- KNF Award: Kala azar by Janis Rafailidou
