= Manasulo Maata =

- Poster
- Directed by: S. V. Krishna Reddy
- Written by: Maruduri Raja (dialogues)
- Screenplay by: S. V. Krishna Reddy
- Story by: V. Ravichandran
- Based on: Kannedhirey Thondrinal (Tamil)
- Produced by: P. Usha Rani
- Starring: Jagapathi Babu; Srikanth; Mahima Chaudhary
- Cinematography: Hari Anumolu
- Edited by: K. Ram Gopal Reddy
- Music by: S. V. Krishna Reddy
- Production companies: Sravanthi Art Movies; Chandra Kiran Movies
- Release date: 2 April 1999
- Running time: 151 mins
- Country: India
- Language: Telugu

Manasulo Maata (transl. The Word in Heart) is a 1999 Indian Telugu-language romantic drama film directed by S. V. Krishna Reddy and starring Jagapathi Babu, Srikanth and Mahima Chaudhary. The film is a remake of the Tamil film Kannedhirey Thondrinal (1998).

== Cast ==
- Jagapati Babu as Shankar
- Srikanth as Vasanth
- Mahima Chaudhry as Priya
- Ali as Guru Murthy
- Bandla Ganesh as Ganesh
- Gowtham Raju as Too Much
- Sri Harsha as Raghu
- Rathan as Vasanth's father
- Sishva as Laila
- Sangeetha as Shankar's mother
- Mamilla Shailaja Priya as Radhika

== Production ==
The film marked the debut of Bollywood actress Mahima Chaudhary in Telugu cinema. Some scenes were shot at Exhibition Grounds at Hyderabad.

== Soundtrack ==
Manasulo Maata

Film score by S. V. Krishna Reddy
- Released: 1998
- Genre: Soundtrack
- Length: 31:07
- Label: Supreme Music
- Producer: S. V. Krishna Reddy

S. V. Krishna Reddy chronology
Pelli Peetalu (1998)	Manasulo Maata (1998)	Premaku Velayera (1999)

The soundtrack was composed by S. V. Krishna Reddy and was released on Supreme Music Company. The song "Eshwara" is reused from the original Tamil film. The song "Preminchuma O" is based on Yaad Piya Ki from the Hindi film Pyaar Koi Khel Nahin (1998), and the song "Prema O Prema" is based on "Jabilli Kosam" from Manchi Manasulu (1986).

Track list
No.	Title	Lyrics	Singer(s)	Length
1.	"Neela Meeda Jabili"	Veturi Sundararama Murthy	S. P. Balasubrahmanyam, K. S. Chithra	5:02
2.	"Prema O Prema"	Sirivennela Sitaramasastri	K. S. Chithra	4:45
3.	"Hai Hai"	Veturi Sundararama Murthy	K. S. Chithra, Unnikrishnan	4:10
4.	"Preminchu Okkasari"	Veturi Sundararama Murthy	S. P. Balasubrahmanyam, Udit Narayan	4:11
5.	"Eeswara"	Veturi Sundararama Murthy	Udit Narayan	5:19
6.	"Diridiridi"	Sirivennela Seetharama Sastry	Udit Narayan, Sunanda Sharma	4:41
7.	"Kousalya Supraja Raja"	Sirivennela Seetharama Sastry	S. P. Balasubrahmanyam	2:59
Total length:				31:07

== Reception ==
Griddaluru Gopalrao of Zamin Ryot praised the presence of both a strong friendship and a beautiful love story. A critic from Andhra Today wrote that "Produced on Chandrakiran Films and directed by S.V.Krishna Reddy, known for neat entertainers, Manasulo Maata is a fresh treatment to a love story".

== Box office ==
According to Sravanthi Ravi Kishore, the film was a box office failure due to "wrong casting" and he lost ₹1.5 crore on the film despite initially having good word-of-mouth. In an interview, Ravi Kishore held himself responsible for the film's failure as he "failed to produce it in an effective way".
