= Phase of matter =

Phase of matter may refer to:

- Phase (matter), a region of matter with uniform physical properties.
- State of matter, forms which matter can take
- Phases of Matter (film), a documentary
