= Sandhitha Velai =

- Poster
- Directed by: Ravichandran
- Written by: Ravichandran
- Produced by: Kaja Mohideen
- Starring: Karthik; Roja; Kausalya
- Cinematography: Jayanan Vincent
- Edited by: B. Lenin; V. T. Vijayan
- Music by: Deva
- Production company: Roja Combines
- Release date: 14 April 2000
- Running time: 146 minutes
- Country: India
- Language: Tamil

Sandhitha Velai (transl. The Time We Met) is a 2000 Indian Tamil-language drama film directed by Ravichandran, his second film after Kannedhirey Thondrinal (1998). The film stars Karthik in two roles. Roja and Kausalya play the female leads, while Vijayakumar, Sujatha, Moulee, Chinni Jayanth, Vivek, Manivannan, and Nassar play supporting roles alongside an ensemble cast. The film was released on 14 April 2000 during the Tamil New Year.

== Plot ==
Aadalarasu is an unemployed graduate living with his parents Gurumoorthy and Sujatha. Aadalarasu is kind-hearted; however, luck does not favour him in finding a suitable job. Gurumoorthy frequently scolds Aadalarasu for his unemployment. But Aadalarasu's mother remains supportive. Aadalarasu goes to Chennai for an interview and stays in his father's friend Sivaraman's home where he meets Thilaka, the only daughter of Sivaraman. Gurumoorthy and Sivaraman decide to have Aadalarasu and Thilaka marry, hoping that Aadalarasu would become responsible after the wedding. Thilaka agrees to this wedding as she could not refuse her father's request, however she does not like Aadalarasu. After the wedding, Thilaka discovers Aadalarasu's kind heart.

One day, Aadalarasu misses a train for an interview, irritating Gurumoorthy, and he scolds him for his irresponsibility. So Aadalarasu feels dejected, and leaves the house hoping to catch the train at some other station. However, in the train, Aadalarasu meets his doppelganger Thirunavukarasu whose health condition looks worse. Thirunavukarasu tells his story to Aadalarasu. Thirunavukarasu hails from a rich business family, however, he is usually lazy, which led to poor performance of his company. Also, Thirunavukarasu's sister's wedding is cancelled due to this. Thirunavukarasu gets drunk and meets with an accident. Later, Thirunavukarasu transforms and understands his responsibilities and decides to turn around the company. He also married Akalya. However, to his shock, it is revealed that the car accident had created some problem in health which was left unnoticed by the doctors earlier and it is too late to save him. Thirunavukarasu hides this truth from his family members. The story comes to present.

Thirunavukarasu asks Aadalarasu to take care of his family in his place if possible and dies in the train. Aadalarasu decides to fulfil Thirunavukarasu's final wish and goes to Chennai as Thirunavukarasu. Meanwhile, Thirunavukarasu's corpse is brought to Aadalarasu's home, startling Aadalarasu's family. They suspect that Aadalarasu killed himself. Aadalarasu’s mother dies as she could not accept the death of her son. Thilaka feels sad. However, she is convinced by Gurumoorthy to go to Chennai and start a fresh life by finding a job. Thilaka comes to Chennai and attends some interviews.

Aadalarasu substitutes Thirunavukarasu and turns around his company. Thirunavukarasu's transformation pleases his family. He also takes Akalya into the business and trains her. Aadalarasu requests his father to transfer all the properties and businesses to Akalya's name. One day, Akalya meets Thilaka who was her classmate during college days. Akalya feels sorry for the death of Thilaka's husband and offers her a job in their company. Thilaka visits Akalya's company hoping to be hired but is surprised that Aadalarasu is the MD. Aadalarasu is also shocked to see Thilaka. Aadalarasu reveals his identity to everyone. Akalya cries because her husband has died. Thirunavukarasu's family members thank Aadalarasu for fulfilling Thirunavukarasu's last wish. In the end, Aadalarasu joins with Thilaka.

== Cast ==
- Karthik as Nadarajan aka Aadalarasu and Thirunaavukkarasu
- Roja as Thilaka
- Kausalya as Akalya
- Vijayakumar as Gurumoorthy: Aadalarasu's father
- Sujatha as Aadalarasu's mother
- T. S. B. K. Moulee as Sivaraman: Thilaka's father
- Chinni Jayanth as Jeeva
- Vivek
- Manivannan
- Nassar
- Sonu Sood as Sandeep
- Thalaivasal Vijay as Vasu
- Ramji
- Anu Mohan
- Madhan Bob
- Thyagu
- Pandu
- Bala Singh
- Thalapathy Dinesh
- Lavanya
- Shakti Kumar
- Raju Sundaram in a special appearance

== Production ==
The filming began in 1998 and was the second directorial work by Ravichandran. It was briefly delayed due to the selection of heroines. Isha Koppikar and then Suvalakshmi were selected for a role, but their refusal meant that Roja was signed. For another lead role, Simran was selected but due to date clashes, she too was replaced by Kausalya. There were rumours that the film was delayed because of Karthik experiencing trouble due to his health.

== Soundtrack ==
The music was composed by Deva.

| Song | Singers | Lyrics |
|---|---|---|
| Ceylon Singala Penne | Sukhwinder Singh, Sabesh | K. Subash |
| Chinna Ponnu | T. K. Kala | Vairamuthu |
| Kobapadathe Muniamma | Sabesh | Ponniyin Selvan |
| Pennkiliye | P. Unnikrishnan, Sujatha | Vairamuthu |
| Vaa Vaa En Thalaiva | Harini, P. Unnikrishnan, 'Mahanadi' Shobana | Vairamuthu |

== Reception ==
Krishna Chidambaram of Kalki was critical of illogical sequences and was critical of Vijayakumar and Roja's acting but called Vivek's comedy the film's only positive aspect. S. R. Ashok Kumar of The Hindu wrote "The story is not new but director Ravichandran has tried to give enough pep to the proceedings through his effective screenplay." Malini Mannath of Chennai Online wrote "The lead artistes do try to give their best, but the insipid script and uninteresting narration lets them down. The story line is old and there is nothing exciting about the situations either. Ravichandran made a promising debut as film director in ‘Kannethire Thondrinal‘. But this film looks like the work of an amateur".
