= Majunu =

2001 film by Ravichandran

- Poster
- Directed by: Ravichandran
- Written by: Balakumaran (dialogues)
- Story by: Ravichandran
- Produced by: Murali Manohar
- Starring: Prashanth; Rinke Khanna
- Cinematography: Priyan
- Edited by: B. Lenin; V. T. Vijayan
- Music by: Harris Jayaraj
- Production company: Cee (I) TV Entertainment(p)ltd
- Release date: 14 December 2001
- Running time: 158 minutes
- Country: India
- Language: Tamil

Majunu is a 2001 Indian Tamil-language romantic thriller film directed by Ravichandran and produced by Sunanda Murali Manohar. The film stars Prashanth and Rinke Khanna, with Sonu Sood, Raghuvaran, Rati Agnihotri and Vivek appearing in other pivotal roles. The film's score and soundtrack were composed by Harris Jayaraj, whilst Priyan handled the cinematography. The film was distributed by London-based Tamil Television channel – Cee I TV. The film was released on 14 December 2001 and performed well at the box office. Notably, this was the first and only Tamil film of Khanna and remains the only collaboration between music director Harris Jayaraj and Prashanth.

== Plot ==
Vasanth is a post-graduate student and son of the wealthy MP Gajapathy. Gajapathy is a senior leader in a religion-based national party and acts against interfaith marriage. Vasanth lives a fun-filled life in Chennai until he meets a girl when they both rush to save a baby who was about to fall onto the railway track. Vasanth develops an attraction for that girl and meets her again at his college. He learns that her name is Heena, a Bengali girl whose father was a Tamilian, and she has come for an exchange program. Meanwhile, terrorists plot to kill Gajapathy in an explosion at a public gathering. Heena, who was on an educational trip to Chennai, was looking for books in a bookstore. Since a book was unavailable that day, she had to return to the shop. As she leaving the shop, a sound came from the alarm on her watch in her bag, which she joked was a bomb that would destroy everything in a 2km radius. The shopkeeper laughs at her joke.

Heena returns to the shop, near where a public meeting is being held. As planned by terrorists, a bomb explodes, but Gajapathy is only wounded. The shopkeeper immediately decides that Heena is the terrorist because of the joke she made during her last visit. Also, circumstantial evidence is against her. Hence, the police and Gajapathy's men search for her, but Heena escapes. Meanwhile, Vasanth hits one of the terrorists accidentally and finds bombs in his bags. He immediately chases the terrorist, but the terrorist kills himself using poison when the police catch him.

Heena hides in a house that turns out to be Vasanth's palatial house. Vasanth finds her in the backyard and takes her to his room. Heena denies the charge against her. Vasanth assures her that he believes her and that he has to send her back to Kolkata. Vasanth helps her by keeping her in his room without his parents' knowledge. Both develop an attraction for each other, but Vasanth is keen to send her home. Heena finds out that he is the son of the man whom she is charged with attempted murder. Vasanth takes her to the railway station amidst a cyclone and sends her home to Kolkata.

A week later, Vasanth lies to his parents that he is going for a vacation computer course in Mumbai and leaves for Kolkata with his friend Ganesh to find Heena, knowing only her name. He searches for her in many colleges and finally finds her. She is happy to see Vasanth again, takes him to her home, and introduces him to her mother, while her brother leaves before Vasanth's arrival.

It is revealed that Heena's brother is the mastermind behind the plot to kill Gajapathy, which his family does not know. The brother learns about Vasanth's arrival and plans to kill him, without knowing he saved his sister. Both Vasanth and Heena become close, which her mother dislikes. She urges Heena to keep away from him, which disappoints Heena. Vasanth expresses his love for her. Heena finds out her brother's real identity and fears that he might kill Vasanth, so she pretends to reject him. Vasanth is hurt by her rejection but does not back off, hoping to win her love one day.

Heena tells Gajapathy about all the incidents and makes him come to Kolkata to take his son away. Gajapathy arrives and insists that Vasanth come with him, and he unwillingly accepts. Heena's brother learns about Vasanth and Gajapathy and chases after them to kill them. Heena struggles to save them, but Vasanth refuses to cooperate, as he wants her to accept him. Heena finally confesses her love and reveals that her behavior is due to her brother's true identity and intentions. This shatters Heena's mother, who unites Vasanth and Heena and asks them to leave. Both board the running train just in time before Heena's brother catches them, but the police arrests him. The film ends with Vasanth and Heena united.

== Cast ==
- Prashanth as Vasanth
- Rinke Khanna as Heena (Voice dubbed by Savitha Reddy)
- Raghuvaran as Gajapathy
- Vivek as Mano
- Sonu Sood as Heena's brother (Voice dubbed by Ravikiran)
- Rati Agnihotri as Heena's mother (Voice dubbed by Durga Sundarrajan)
- Vaiyapuri as Vasanth's friend
- S. N. Lakshmi as Vasanth's grandma
- Kavithalaya Krishnan
- Besant Ravi
- Shobi in a special appearance in the song "Pada Pada Pattampoochi"

Special appearances in the song "Mercury Mele"

- Nethra Raghuraman
- Ramji
- Thadi Balaji
- Sridhar
- Japan Kumar

Special appearances in the song "Hari Gori"

- Anupama Verma
- Nagendra Prasad
- Mumaith Khan as a background dancer (Uncredited)

== Production ==
Murali Manohar signed on actor Prashanth to appear in the fourth successive production for his studio, following the successes of their previous collaborations Jeans, Kaadhal Kavithai (1998) and Jodi (1999). Director Ravichandran, who had delivered a commercially successful film with Prashanth through Kannedhirey Thondrinal (1998), was chosen to direct Manohar's next production. Hindi actress Rinke Khanna was then signed on to make her Tamil film debut in October 2000 and joined the team after her mother Dimple Kapadia was impressed with the script. Actress Rati Agnihotri also signed on to play Rinke Khanna's mother in the film, making her first appearance in a Tamil film for twenty years. Models Nethra Raghuraman and Anupama Verma also made special appearances in the film.

The team shot scenes in North India, while Prashanth was injured during the making of the film, delaying it temporarily. The art director Yogamahi designed a lavish set in a studio for a song shooting costing Rs.10 lakh, with a Rajasthani ambiance created with 200 people working on it. The song Gulmohar Malare was shot in Colmar Tropicale, a French Themed village in Malaysia. The film had completed filming scenes by July 2001 and dubbing work began, preparing for a September release, although it was later postponed.

== Soundtrack ==
Majunu

Soundtrack album by Harris Jayaraj
- Released: 5 July 2001
- Recorded: 2001
- Genre: Feature film soundtrack
- Length: 36:20
- Language: Tamil
- Labels: Saregama; Cee (I) TV Audio
- Producer: Harris Jayaraj

Harris Jayaraj chronology
Minnale (2001)	Majunu (2001)	12B (2001)

The music was composed by Harris Jayaraj, which was the first film he had signed to work on, though Minnale ended up releasing earlier. The audio cassette of the film was launched in a function held at Taj Coromandel Chennai, where Miss Universe 2000 pageant winner Lara Dutta was the event's chief guest. All lyrics were written by Vairamuthu, except "Hari Gori" written by Thamarai, while the songs received positive reviews from film critics. The song "Mudhal Kanave" which became popular is set in Shanmugapriya raga.

All lyrics are written by Vairamuthu, except where noted.

Track-List
No.	Title	Singer(s)	Length
1.	"Gulmohar Malare"	Hariharan, Timmy, Anupama	5:27
2.	"Hari Gori" (Lyricist:Thamarai)	Tippu, Karthik, Devan Ekambaram, Ganga, Febi Mani	2:59
3.	"Mudhal Kanave"	Harish Raghavendra, Bombay Jayashree, O. S. Arun	5:11
4.	"Pada Pada Pattampoochi"	Shankar Mahadevan, Kavita Krishnamurthy	6:27
5.	"Mercury Mele"	Devan Ekambaram, P. Unnikrishnan	5:30
6.	"Pinju Thendrale"	M. G. Sreekumar, Sandhya	5:20
7.	"Gulmohar Malare" (Bit)	Hariharan, Timmy, Anupama	3:20
Total length:			34:12

== Release and reception ==
The film opened in December 2001. Malathi Rangarajan of The Hindu wrote, "Majunu is a love story in a terrorist ambiance. The ambiance is undoubtedly different but surely the treatment could have been more gripping." Another critic wrote "The storyline is just stupid and should have never been. But Ravichandran makes a better director than a story-writer, and the movie is at least watchable." Chennai Online felt the film "would have turned into an engaging entertainer had the director not left so many loopholes in the script and narration, as he shuttles between depicting ‘love’ and ‘terrorism’". Cinesouth wrote "Majnu - A perplexing film, which kindles the filmgoer's interest a little".

The film did not perform well commercially, following up as another failure for Prashanth, after the big-budget film Star.
