= Desh Ke Mentor =

Desh Ke Mentor is a programme started by the Government of Delhi with the main objective of connecting voluntary mentors with students of classes IX to XII of Delhi Government schools and nurturing them in education and career guidance. The mentors from various professional and academic backgrounds will be assigned a set of students to be trained in 2 to 6 months based on their gender and personal interests. Mentors are required to allot a weekly time of 10 minutes to train the students. The programme is expected to benefit nine lakh students each year.

== History and objective ==
Desh Ke Mentor programme was launched by Government of Delhi in October'2021 with the idea of connecting students of classes IX to XII of Delhi government schools with volunteers who chose to be mentors after fulfilling the eligibility criteria for the same. The programme is designed to facilitate young students with guidance on higher education and career choices and preparing them for various entrance exams and also teaching them on handling various pressures. Under the programme each mentor will be assigned 4 students based on their gender and skills in respective areas.

Bollywood actor Sonu Sood is chosen as Brand Ambassador. Various famous personalities like Olympian Ravi Dahiya, Singer Palash Sen, RJ Adi and Comedian Saloni Gaur were present during launch of the programme and interacted with students. Anyone can participate in the initiative launched by Directorate of Education under "Youth For Education" programme by giving a missed call on 7500040004 and downloading "Desh Ke Mentor" app.

Till January 2022, around 1,74,000 students have been mentored by 44000 mentors, among whom 500 members are from Indian Institute of Technology and Indian Institute of Management and 15,600 members are doing graduation or Doctors in Philosophy from reputed educational Institutes and around 7500 mentors are working in top posts of reputed organisations.

== Mentor selection and requirements ==
Following are the requirements of Mentor under this programme:

- Through an Desh ke Mentor app created by Saarathi, in collaboration with the Delhi Technological University team, anyone in the age group of 18 to 35 years can register themselves.
- Fill the details on date of birth, educational qualification, nature of profession, work experiences in various organisation and sign with undertaking.
- Students connected with mentors on mutual interest basis.
- Mentorship includes regular contact over phone for two months to be extended to four months on optional basis.
- Mentors to complete a brief ‘psychometry test’ on a set of questions.
- On completion of registration based on mentors gender and interests, set of students are assigned.
- Each mentor to schedule weekly time of 10 minutes for the students allotted to them.
- Mentorship programme to run from two to six months. Initial two months are based on compulsory module and remaining four months to be optional.
- Mentors to be from various professional and academic backgrounds.
- Each mentor will be allotted 5 to 10 students categorised on gender and skill requirements of students.

== Concerns ==
Desh Ke Mentor faces following concerns from National Commission for Protection of Child Rights (NCPCR):

- Concerns on child abuse and safety after assigning to mentors.
- Concerns on lack of police verification of mentors.
- Concerns on Psychometric Test authenticity.
- Concerns on child abuse through phone.
- Even after parental consent, child safety is in responsibility of Delhi Government.

== Safeguards ==
Following protective measures which are already included in the program:

- Gender is the primary criteria. Hence female students will get female mentors only and male students will get male mentors.
- All Mentors will be verified via Aadhaar Verification System of UIDAI.
- All Conversation between student and their mentor will be recorded and audited periodically.
- All numbers will be masked, hence no sharing of Student / Mentors numbers. All calls will go through centralized IVR number.
- Psychometric tests designed by qualified professionals and team of professors.
- Respective police stations will do mandatory verification of mentors (In case of any suspicion).
- Offline meeting of mentor and students not allowed.
- Personal details of mentors and students will not be made public at any cost.
- Stringent safeguard mechanism system included in app. Robust grievance redressal system for students.

== See also ==
- Government Schools
