= Janaki Sabesh =

Indian actress

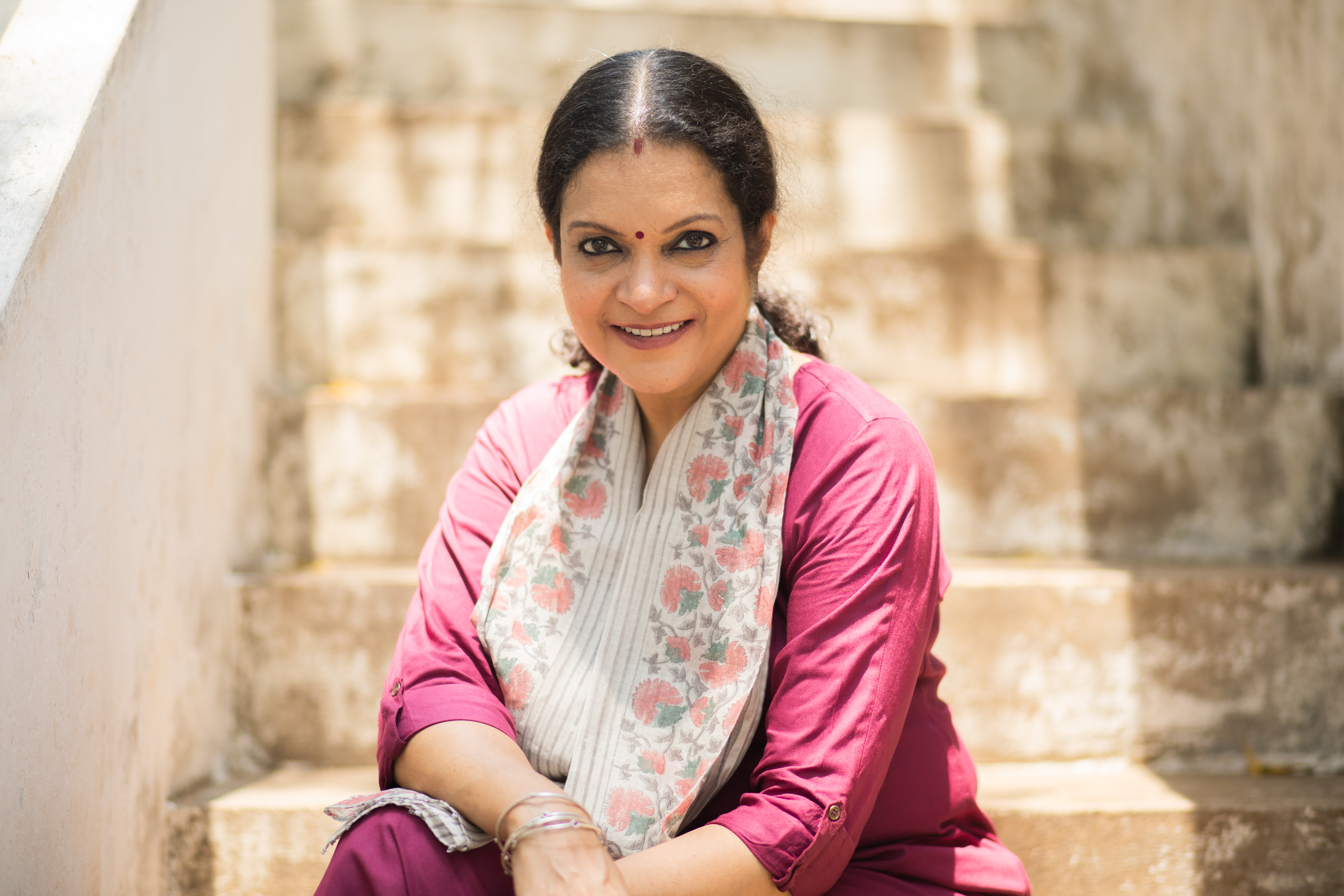
- Born: India
- Occupations: Storyteller, Author, Actress
- Years active: 1992–present
- Children: 1

Janaki Sabesh is an Indian media professional, actor, model, storyteller, author of children's book, theatre and voiceover artist. Throughout her film career, she has played the "screen mother" to several leading actors, appearing predominantly Tamil and Telugu films.

== Early life ==
Janaki was born in Bangalore. She did her initial schooling in Carmel School, Kolkata and then from DTEA Senior Secondary School, New Delhi. She holds a bachelor's degree in political science from Lady Shri Ram College for Women, Delhi and a master's degree in mass communication from Jamia Millia, Delhi. and Bombay Jayashri is her sister in law

== Career ==
In 1991, Janaki Sabesh assisted Simi Garewal with her documentary on Rajiv Gandhi called India's Rajiv. She part of some of the most celebrated storylines such as Minsara Kanavu (1997), Jeans (1998), Ghilli (2004) and Singam (2010).

She also modelled for some of the leading brands like Cadburys, Pepsodent, KFJ, NAC Jewellers, Chakra Gold Tea, and Jansons Dhoti during these years. She has also appeared in a web series titled Black Sheep (2016) on the YouTube channel of Stray Factory, Rascalas. Janaki's work as a theatre artist includes plays with Chennai-based theatre groups, Crea- Shakti & Madras Players.Janaki Sabesh's engagement with children began when she produced an audio cassette The Learning Train (1995) that simplified the world of numbers through story and songs.

She also runs her own storytelling initiative, Golpo - Tales Unlimited. The word Golpo in Bengali means "story". Her sessions are an interactive mix of narration, music and movement. She also conducts workshops for parents, teachers and students which centre on motivation and the productive uses of storytelling.

Janaki has authored a children’s storybook—The Jungle Storytelling Festival—an original creative narration, published by Tulika Publishers. Her 2nd picture book Paati's Rasam (co-authored with Dhwani Sabesh) won the Best Children's Book Award at Jarul 2023.

== Filmography ==
=== Tamil films ===
Year	Film	Role	Notes
1997	Minsara Kanavu	Sister Agnes	
1998	Jeans	Madhumitha's mother	
1999	Jodi	Guest appearance	
2000	Kushi	Jennifer's mother	
2001	Minnale	Rajiv Samuel's mother	
2001	Poovellam Un Vasam	Chinna's mother	
2001	Shahjahan	Mahee's mother	
2002	Run	Siva's mother	
2003	Boys	Renuka	
2003	Enakku 20 Unakku 18	Train passenger	
2004	Ghilli	Velu's mother	
2004	Vaanam Vasappadum	Poongkothai's mother	
2004	Aayutha Ezhuthu	Doctor's wife	
2006	Vettaiyaadu Vilaiyaadu	Janaki	
2006	Vallavan	Vallavan's mother	
2008	Dhaam Dhoom	Gautham's mother	
2009	Ayan	Kamalesh's aide	
2009	Engal Aasan	Annalakshmi	
2010	Singam	Kavya's mother	
2011	Nootrenbadhu	Annalakshmi	
2012	Billa II	David's sister	
2013	Singam 2	Kavya's mother	
2014	Poojai	Divya's mother	
2017	Si3	Kavya's mother	
2022	Achcham Madam Naanam Payirppu	Naidu Aunty	
2023	Let's Get Married	Meera's mother	

=== Other language films ===
Year	Film	Role	Language
2001	Kushi	Geetha	Telugu
2003	Nee Manasu Naaku Telusu	Train passenger	Telugu
2006	Photographer	John's sister-in-law	Malayalam
2007	Shankar Dada Zindabad	Rajyalakshmi	Telugu
2009	Josh	Priyamvada	Telugu
2010	Maro Charitra	Snehalatha	Telugu
2011	180	Annapurna	Telugu

=== Web series ===
Year	Title	Role	Platform
2016	Black Sheep	Mom	YouTube
2025	Nadu Center	Thachi's mother	JioHotstar

Music video

Year	Film	Role	Ref.
2024	Kaadhal Alaipayuthey	Sanjana's mother	

== Press articles ==
- Janaki Sabesh at IMDb
- https://www.thenewsminute.com/article/ghilli-amma-childrens-writer-meet-janaki-sabesh-her-new-avatar-86615
- thehindu.com
- https://www.deccanchronicle.com/entertainment/mollywood/181217/sabash-janaki.html
