= Sonu Sood =

Indian actor and filmmaker (born 1973)

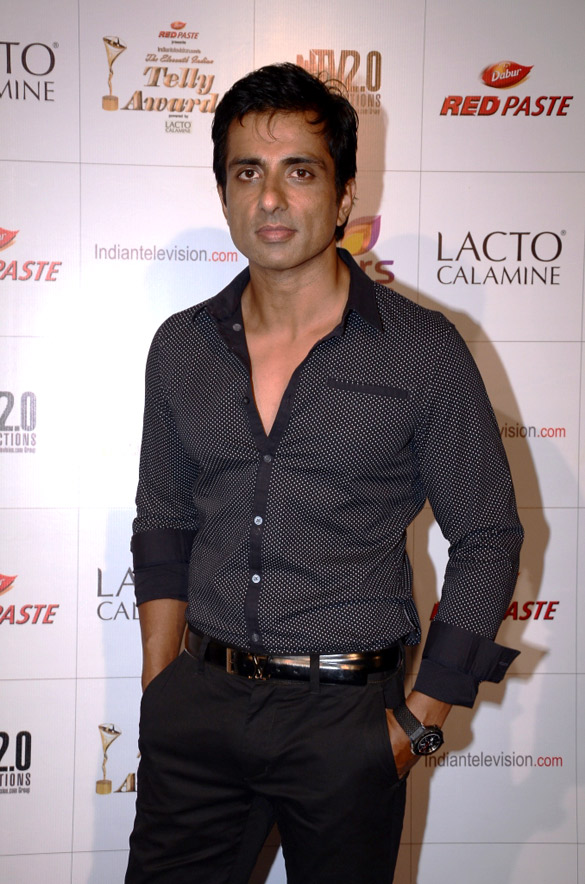
- Sood in 2012
- Born: 30 July 1973 (age 53); Moga, Punjab, India
- Education: Yashwantrao Chavan College of Engineering (BS in Engineering)
- Occupations: Actor; film producer; director; humanitarian; philanthropist
- Years active: 1999–present
- Spouse: Sonali Shridhar (m. 1996)
- Children: 2

Sonu Sood (born 30 July 1973) is an Indian actor, film producer, model, humanitarian, and philanthropist who works predominantly in Hindi, Telugu and Tamil films. He is known for his performances as the negative lead in most of his films.

In 2009, he received the Andhra Pradesh State Nandi Award for Best Villain and the Filmfare Award for Best Supporting Actor – Telugu for his work in the Telugu blockbuster Arundhati. In 2010, he garnered the Apsara Award for Best Actor in a Negative Role and the IIFA Award for Best Performance in a Negative Role for his performance in Bollywood film Dabangg. In 2012, he received the SIIMA Award for Best Actor in a Negative Role (Telugu) for his role in Julayi.

Sood's other successful works include Yuva (2004), Athadu (2005), Aashiq Banaya Aapne (2005), Ashok (2006), Jodhaa Akbar (2008), Kandireega (2011), Dookudu (2011), Shootout at Wadala (2013), R... Rajkumar (2013), Happy New Year (2014), Devi (2016), Kung Fu Yoga (2017), Simmba (2018), and Kurukshetra (2019). He also appeared in commercials for Apollo Tyres and Airtel.

In July 2016, he established the production house Shakti Sagar Productions, which is named after his father, Shakti Sagar Sood. In September 2020, Sood was chosen for the ‛SDG Special Humanitarian Action Award’ by the United Nations Development Programme (UNDP) for his humanitarian works during the COVID-19 pandemic. In June 2022, he launched his social media app called Explurger.

== Education ==
Sonu Sood was educated at Sacred Heart School, Moga, Punjab and B.Tech in Electronics engineering at Yashwantrao Chavan College of Engineering

== Career ==
In 1999, Sood began his career through his first two Tamil language films, Kallazhagar and Nenjinile. He then appeared as an antagonist in the Telugu film Hands Up! in 2000. In 2001, he appeared in Majunu. He then began starring in Hindi films, with Shaheed-E-Azam, as Bhagat Singh in 2002. Sood earned recognition as Abhishek Bachchan's brother in Mani Ratnam's Yuva in 2004 and in Aashiq Banaya Aapne in 2005.

In Tollywood, with the release of Super in 2005, he received greater recognition for his work. In this film, his co-star was Nagarjuna as a high-tech thief. His next film was Athadu. In 2006, he again portrayed the antagonist in Ashok. It was an average grosser, but by now he had become popular in Telugu films.

In 2009, he played the role of Pasupathy in Arundhati. Following the Tollywood release of Arundhati, he played the role of Rajkumar Sujamal in the Indian epic film Jodha Akbar, directed by Ashutosh Gowariker. In 2009, he played the role of gangster Bada in Anjaneyulu opposite Ravi Teja. In the latter half of 2009, he acted in another Telugu film Ek Niranjan, in which he again played the antagonist. In 2010, he played the lead antagonist in Abhinav Kashyap's Dabangg, co-starring with Salman Khan. His Kannada debut with Sudeep, Vishnuvardhana (2011), released to positive reviews of his performance. He was appointed "the state icon of Punjab" by the state election commission.

In April 2022, the popular reality show MTV Roadies - Season 18 was hosted by Sonu Sood in South Africa. As he reflected on the experience, he emphasized that the "magic" attribute of the show was that it demanded one to be absolutely real & every single day of our 45-day stay in South Africa was a learning experience for him.

== Filmography ==
| Year | Title | Role | Language | Notes |
|---|---|---|---|---|
| 1999 | Kallazhagar | Soumya Narayanan (Priest) | Tamil | |
| 1999 | Nenjinile | Gangster | Tamil | |
| 2000 | Hands Up! | Tuglak | Telugu | |
| 2000 | Sandhitha Velai | Sandeep | Tamil | |
| 2001 | Majunu | Heena's brother | Tamil | |
| 2002 | Shaheed-E-Azam | Bhagat Singh | Hindi | |
| 2002 | Zindagi Khoobsurat Hai | Murad | Hindi | |
| 2002 | Raja | Bhavani | Tamil | |
| 2003 | Ammayilu Abbayilu | Rakesh | Telugu | |
| 2003 | Kovilpatti Veeralakshmi | Rajiv Mathur | Tamil | |
| 2003 | Kahan Ho Tum | Karan | Hindi | |
| 2004 | Netaji Subhas Chandra Bose: The Forgotten Hero | Lt. Col Shah Nawaz Khan | Hindi | |
| 2004 | Mission Mumbai | Capt. Rajeev Singh | Hindi | |
| 2004 | Yuva | Gopal Singh | Hindi | |
| 2005 | Sheesha | Raj | Hindi | |
| 2005 | Chandramukhi | Oomayan | Tamil | |
| 2005 | Super | Sonu | Telugu | |
| 2005 | Athadu | Malli | Telugu | |
| 2005 | Aashiq Banaya Aapne | Karan Oberoi | Hindi | |
| 2005 | Siskiyaan | Dr. Vishwas | Hindi | |
| 2005 | Divorce: Not Between Husband and Wife | Siddharth Joshi | Hindi | |
| 2006 | Ashok | K K | Telugu | |
| 2006 | Rockin' Meera | Prince | English | |
| 2007 | Fu’un Super Combo | Kim Sue Il | Malayalam | |
| 2008 | Jodhaa Akbar | Prince Sujamal | Hindi | Nominated, Filmfare Award for Best Supporting Actor |
| 2008 | Mr Medhavi | Siddharth | Telugu | |
| 2008 | Singh Is Kinng | Lakhan 'Lucky' Singh | Hindi | |
| 2008 | Ek Vivaah... Aisa Bhi | Prem Ajmera | Hindi | |
| 2009 | Arundhati | Pasupathi | Telugu | Nandi Award for Best Villain; Filmfare Best Supporting Actor Award (Telugu) |
| 2009 | Dhoondte Reh Jaaoge | Aryan | Hindi | |
| 2009 | Anjaneyulu | Bada | Telugu | |
| 2009 | Bangaru Babu | Rajendra | Telugu | |
| 2009 | Ek Niranjan | Johnny Bhai | Telugu | |
| 2009 | City of Life | Basu/Peter Patel | Arabic, English, Hindi | Trilingual film |
| 2010 | Dabangg | Chhedi Singh | Hindi | IIFA Award for Best Performance in a Negative Role; Apsara Award for Best Actor in a Negative Role |
| 2011 | Shakti | Mukthar | Telugu | |
| 2011 | Theenmaar | Sudhir | Telugu | |
| 2011 | Bbuddah... Hoga Tera Baap | ACP Karan Malhotra | Hindi | |
| 2011 | Kandireega | Bhavani | Telugu | |
| 2011 | Dookudu | Nayak | Telugu | CineMAA Award for Best Actor in a Negative Role |
| 2011 | Vishnuvardhana | Adhishesha | Kannada | Nominated, SIIMA Award for Best Actor in a Negative Role – Kannada; Nominated, Sandalwood Star Award for Best Actor in a Negative Role; Nominated, Bangalore Times Film Award for Best Actor in a Negative Role Male |
| 2011 | Osthe | Boxer Daniel | Tamil | |
| 2012 | Maximum | Inspector Pratap Pandit | Hindi | |
| 2012 | Uu Kodathara? Ulikki Padathara? | Phanindra Bhupathi | Telugu | |
| 2012 | Julai | Bittu | Telugu | Nominated, SIIMA Award for Best Actor in a Negative Role (Telugu) |
| 2013 | Shootout at Wadala | Dilawar Imtiaz Haksar | Hindi | |
| 2013 | Ramaiya Vastavaiya | Raghuveer | Hindi | |
| 2013 | Bhai | James | Telugu | |
| 2013 | R... Rajkumar | Shivraj Gurjar | Hindi | |
| 2014 | Entertainment | Arjun | Hindi | |
| 2014 | Aagadu | Damodar | Telugu | |
| 2014 | Happy New Year | Jagmohan Prakash (Jag) | Hindi | |
| 2016 | Saagasam | Bittu | Tamil | |
| 2016 | Xuanzang | Harsha | Mandarin | Chinese film |
| 2016 | Ishq Positive | Himself | Urdu | Pakistani film; Cameo appearance |
| 2016 | Devi | Raj Khanna | Tamil | Trilingual film; Also producer for Hindi version |
| 2016 | Abhinetri | Raj Khanna | Telugu | Trilingual film; Also producer for Hindi version |
| 2016 | Tutak Tutak Tutiya | Raj Khanna | Hindi | Trilingual film; Also producer for Hindi version |
| 2017 | Kung Fu Yoga | Randall | Mandarin | Trilingual film |
| 2017 | Kung Fu Yoga | Randall | Hindi | Trilingual film |
| 2017 | Kung Fu Yoga | Randall | English | Trilingual film |
| 2018 | Paltan | Maj. Bishen Singh | Hindi | |
| 2018 | Simmba | Durva Ranade | Hindi | |
| 2019 | Kurukshetra | Arjuna | Kannada | |
| 2019 | Devi 2 | Raj Khanna | Tamil | Bilingual film; Cameo appearance |
| 2019 | Abhinetri 2 | Raj Khanna | Telugu | Bilingual film; Cameo appearance |
| 2019 | Sita | Basavaraju | Telugu | |
| 2021 | Alludu Adhurs | Gaja | Telugu | |
| 2022 | Acharya | Basava | Telugu | |
| 2022 | Samrat Prithviraj | Chand Bardai | Hindi | |
| 2023 | Tamilarasan | Rana Prathap Singh | Tamil | |
| 2023 | Sreemanta | - | Kannada | |
| 2025 | Fateh | Fateh Singh | Hindi | Also director, writer, and producer; directorial debut |
| 2025 | Madha Gaja Raja | Karukuvel Vishwanath | Tamil | |

=== Dubbing career ===
| Film title | Actor | Character | Dub Language | Original Language | Original Year release | Notes |
|---|---|---|---|---|---|---|
| The Legend of Hercules | Kellan Lutz | Hercules/Alcides | Hindi | English | 2014 | |

=== Television ===
| Year | Title | Role | Notes |
|---|---|---|---|
| 2022–2023 | MTV Roadies | Host | Season 19 & 20 |

== Music videos ==
| Year | Track | Musical Artists | Director | Language | Notes |
|---|---|---|---|---|---|
| 2021 | Pagal Nahi Hona | Sunanda Sharma, Jaani, Avvy Sra | Mahi Sandhu, Joban Sandhu | Punjabi | |
| 2021 | Saath Kya Nibhaoge | Tony Kakkar, Altaf Raja | Farah Khan | Hindi | |

== Personal life ==
In 1996, Sood married Sonali, a Telugu lady, who hails from Andhra Pradesh. They have two sons named Ayaan and Ishant. He is an eggetarian.

== Philanthropy ==
=== Sood Charity Foundation ===
Sood has founded the Sood Charity Foundation "to help people of all stature". An initiative by Sood for providing free coaching to UPSC exam candidates from underprivileged financial backgrounds. Sood was announced as the Delhi Government's brand ambassador of its Desh ke Mentor ("country mentor") programme by the Delhi chief minister Arvind Kejriwal on 27 August 2021.

SANKALP is one of the flagship campaigns of the Sood Charity Foundation. It is a free law entrance coaching program to assist people with academic guidance and other essential resources for CLAT and AILET exam preparation. The goal has been to bridge the gap between the less-privileged deserving candidates and Law schools.

The train accident in Odisha's Balasore resulted in the death of over 250 people and left more than 1,000 injured. Sonu launched Helpline For Odisha Train Accident Victims and requests the government to set up a relief fund.

=== Fraudsters impersonating Sood Charity Foundation ===
Across the country there are many volunteers and agents who have possibly associated to support the work of the organization and have started contacting people via twitter, Facebook and Instagram to impersonate Sonu Sood and Sonali Sood and are collecting fees in his name. They take the money online via bank transfers and later withdraw the money via ATM machines. Reports also suggest that they spoof emails of Sood Charity Foundation. The Foundation has not actively taken steps to ensure this stops and contacting the foundation senior management is near impossible to most civilians.

=== Social work during the COVID-19 pandemic ===
In May 2020, during the nationwide lockdown due to the COVID-19 pandemic, Sood helped thousands of stranded Indian migrant workers to reach their homes by arranging buses, special trains and chartered flights for them. In July 2020 he arranged a chartered flight to bring home over 1,500 Indian students stranded in Kyrgyzstan, flying them from Bishkek to Varanasi. His charity during the pandemic was lauded, and he was hailed as a real-life hero in India.

On 25 July 2020, a video of a farmer's daughters ploughing a field, like bulls with a yoke on their shoulders, went viral over social media. Sood quickly sent the family a tractor. On 5 August 2020, he helped 101 medical students, predominantly from Tamil Nadu, who were stranded in Moscow during the lockdown, reach Chennai safely on a chartered flight arranged by him after they contacted his team for help. On his birthday he launched a website and app called Pravasi Rojgar to help migrant workers find suitable jobs amid the pandemic. On 19 February 2021, Sood launched an initiative 'Ilaaj India' platform to provide healthcare services for needy people. In December 2020 he published I Am No Messiah, autobiographical book, narrating his journey to become an actor, and narrating his social work during the pandemic.

On 17 April 2021, Sonu Sood tested positive for COVID-19. He also shared a message for his fans in his post that read: "Covid – positive. Mood and spirit – super positive. Hi everyone, this is to inform you that I have tested positive this morning for COVID-19. As a part of precautions, I have already quarantined myself and taking utmost care. But don't worry this gives me ample time to solve your problems. Remember I am always there for you all."

In 2021, Sood provided much-needed oxygen plants and cylinders for COVID-19 patients in India. Sood and Kumar Vishwas have supported the Aao Gaon Bachayein ("Save the Villages") campaign started by comic poet and satirist Pankaj Prasun.

== Bibliography ==
- Sood, Sonu; Iyer, Meena (2020). I Am No Messiah. Penguin India. ISBN 978-0-14-345198-3.
