= Natpadhigaram 79 =

2016 Indian film by Ravichandran

- Theatrical release poster
- Directed by: Ravichandran
- Produced by: D. Ravikumar
- Starring: Raj Bharath; Amzath Khan; Reshmi Menon; Tejaswi Madivada
- Cinematography: R. B. Gurudev
- Edited by: V. J. Sabu Joseph
- Music by: Deepak Nilambur
- Production company: Jayam Cine Entertainment
- Release date: 11 March 2016
- Country: India
- Language: Tamil

Natpadhigaram 79 (transl. Friendship chapter 79) is a 2016 Indian Tamil language film written and directed by Ravichandran. The film features Raj Bharath, Amzath Khan, Reshmi Menon and Tejaswi Madivada in the leading roles, with Deepak Nilambur composing the film's music and the film was released in March 2016

== Plot ==
After meeting at a nightclub, Jeeva, Aravind, Maha, and Pooja quickly develop a friendship. However, their bond is jeopardized when misunderstandings arise among them, potentially leading to its dissolution.

== Cast ==
- Raj Bharath as Jeeva
- Amzath Khan as Aravind
- Reshmi Menon as Maha
- Tejaswi Madivada as Pooja
- Subbu Panchu
- M. S. Bhaskar as Maha's father
- Vignesh Karthick as Jeeva's friend
- Uma Padmanabhan
- Vinodhini Vaidyanathan
- Ramanathan
- Rail Ravi
- Raju Sundaram special appearance in the song "Sollu Sollu Chellamma"
- Sridhar special appearance in the song "Sollu Sollu Chellamma"

== Production ==
Director Ravichandran re-emerged from a sabbatical and began making a film on friendship featuring his nephew Raj Bharath during late 2014. Other rookie actors Amzath Khan, Reshmi Menon and Tejaswi Madivada were signed on to play further leading roles in the project. Raj Bharath also worked as an assistant director to Ravichandran during the making of the film. The film's shoot progressed throughout mid 2014 in Bangalore, Mysore, Chennai and Pondicherry, before the climax scenes were shot in October 2014.

Despite being ready for release in April 2015, the team failed to find a distributor amidst several other film releases during the period. The team subsequently added another song, featuring Raju Sundaram, before announcing their release date in March 2016.

== Soundtrack ==
Soundtrack was composed by Deepak Nilambar.

No.	Song	Singers	Length
1	"Sollu Chellamma"	Deva	4:26
2	"Nanba Nanba Anbendral"	Haricharan, Deepak Nilambar	5:53
3	"Thozha Thozha"	Deepak Nilambur	4:58
4	"Shaila My Shaila"	Naresh Iyer	4:34
5	"Penne Nee Kadhal"	Yazin Nizar, Mahathi	4:56
6	"Endhan Jeevan Azhaikudhey"	Deepak Nilambur	1:39

== Reception ==
The film opened to mixed reviews upon release in March 2016, with a critic from The Hindu noting it has an "interesting premise but is a disappointing film". Likewise, another critic from The New Indian Express wrote "Natpadhigaram would have been an apt tribute to friendship and love, if only the screenplay was crafted more coherently and convincingly".
