= Ròm =

2019 Vietnamese film

- Film poster
- Directed by: Tran Thanh Huy
- Written by: Tran Thanh Huy
- Produced by: Anh Hung Tran; Trinh Hoan Nguyen; Nguyen Bao; Hoang Diep Nguyen; Tien Nhat
- Starring: Anh Khoa Tran; Phan Anh Tu Nguyen; Phuong Cat; Tran Mai; Wowy
- Cinematography: Vinh Phuc Nguyen
- Edited by: Lee Chatemetikool; Tran Thanh Huy
- Music by: Tôn Thất An
- Production companies: HKFilm: Red Ruby; East Films
- Distributed by: CJ Entertainment; HKFilm
- Release dates: 4 October 2019 (BIFF); 25 September 2020 (Vietnam)
- Running time: 79 minutes
- Country: Vietnam
- Language: Vietnamese
- Box office: 64.6 billion VND (according to Box Office Vietnam); 63 billion VND (according to VnExpress); 2,509 million USD (57.9 billion VND) (according to Box Office Mojo)

Ròm is a 2019 Vietnamese film on the topic of crime and violence, directed by Tran Thanh Huy. The film had its world premiere at the 24th Busan International Film Festival on 4 October 2019, where it won the New Currents Award, becoming the first Vietnamese film to receive the award.

== Plot ==
In a decrepit apartment complex in Ho Chi Minh City, residents are deep in debt. They gamble in the hope that they can gain enough money to keep their apartment and achieve their dreams. 14-year-old Ròm works as bookie lottery runner to earn a living. He lives in poverty after being separated from his parents and hopes to one day find them.

Phúc, a rival lottery winner, gains the trust of the apartment residents by recommending winning numbers. However, Phúc had been tricking the residents for a long time. Seeing that this isn’t right, Ròm changes this by helping the people pick a good number. Ròm’s number wins and Phúc loses all of his customers to Ròm. Believing in Ròm’s good luck, the tenants want to bet big to settle all of their debts.

Phúc kidnaps Ròm and takes all of the bets to turn in. Once Ròm escapes, the creditors are demand to have their debts paid off and threaten people with violence. They burn down the apartment complex.

Some time later, Ròm and Phúc meet again and Phúc steals Ròm's earnings. Ròm chases him endlessly down a busy city street, leaving his fate unknown.

In a post-credits scene, Ròm is seen as a homeless child, living on the street until a group of boys offer him food.

== Cast ==
- Anh Khoa Tran
- Phan Anh Tu Nguyen
- Phuong Cat
- Tran Mai
- Wowy

== Release ==
The film had its world premiere at the 24th Busan International Film Festival on 4 October 2019.

=== Controversy ===
After the Busan International Film Festival (BIFF), Ròm was given a penalty for joining the festival without gaining a screening license. The Ministry of Culture, Sports, and Tourism imposed a VND40 milion ($1,720 USD) administrative fine on Hoan Khue Film Production JSC (HKFilm), the production company behind Ròm. HKFilm failed to edit out some violent scenes as requested by a national film evaluation council. The ministry also gave the company ten days to destroy the copy of the film that was sent to BIFF, after which authorities would coercively enact "spoliation of the evidence."

== Accolades ==
Award	Category	Recipient	Result
Busan International Film Festival	New Currents Award - Best Film	Rom	Won
Fantasia International Film Festival	Best First Feature - Best Movie Debut	Rom	Won
