= Andhra Mess =

- Theatrical release poster
- Directed by: Jai
- Written by: Jai
- Produced by: Nirmal K. Bala
- Starring: Raj Bharath; Thejaswini; Pooja Devariya; A. P. Shreethar; Mathivanan Rajendran; Balaji Mohan; Vinoth Munna; R. Amarendran
- Cinematography: Mukesh Gnanesh
- Music by: Prashant Pillai
- Production company: Showboat Studios
- Release date: 22 June 2018
- Country: India
- Language: Tamil

Andhra Mess is 2018 Indian Tamil-language action thriller film directed by Jai and produced by Nirmal K. Bala. The film stars Raj Bharath, Thejaswini, Pooja Devariya, A. P. Shreethar, Mathivanan Rajendran, and Balaji Mohan while Vinoth Munna and R. Amarendran play supporting roles. The film has music scored by Prashant Pillai. The film was released on 22 June 2018 after being delayed in production for three years.

== Plot ==
Devaraj (Vinoth Munna), a gangster, is hired to steal a bag from a house. He delegates this task to his underlings Varadhu (A. P. Shreethar), Rathna (Raj Bharath), Ritchie (Mathivanan Rajendran), and Sethu (Balaji Mohan). Varadhu, who has just broken up with his girlfriend (who has insulted him for being a nobody), finds out that the bag has crores of cash and decides that this could be his moment to get rich. The criminals scoot away with the bag to a remote village, where they take refuge under Janardhanan (R. Amarendran), an elderly man whose family were once zamindars, along with his wife and Bala (Tejaswini). During their stay, Rathna and Bala begin an affair, and Ritchie's girlfriend Arasi (Pooja Devariya) also enters the scene. She causes a problem between Richie and his gang, causing the couple to break up. Devaraj tracks them down and in a freak accident, becomes paralyzed. Janardhanan dies in a hunting trip, and Bala is united with Rathna. They all start a hotel by the name of Andhra Mess in Janadhanan's property.

== Cast ==
- Thejaswini as Bala
- Pooja Devariya as Arasi
- A. P. Shreethar as Varadhu
- Raj Bharath as Rathna
- Mathivanan Rajendran as Ritchie
- Balaji Mohan as Sethu
- Vinoth Munna as Devaraj
- R. Amarendran as Janardhanan
- Aadhira Pandilakshmi as Geetha
- Syed as Reddy

== Production ==
Noted artist A. P. Shreethar, made his film debut with the venture portraying a negative role. To train him, director Jai arranged a 15-day acting workshop for Sreethar with koothu-p-pattarai. Mathivannan Rajendran made his lead debut with this film although it ended up releasing after Sawaari.

== Reception ==
A critic from The Times of India gave the film two out of five stars and wrote that " In the end, despite looking colourful, this Andhra Mess ends up serving us fare that lacks spice". The New Indian Express gave the film a rating of 2.5 out of 5 stars and wrote that "A lot of interesting bits that add up to nothing". A critic from Deccan Chronicle gave a similar rating and noted that "Andhra Mess tries to provide a uniquely flavorful experience but comes out forced and undercooked. Directed by ad-filmmaker turned director Jai, this movie is technically all sound, but lacks the synergy to make it work".
