= I Am No Messiah =

Autobiographical book written by Sonu Sood

- Front cover
- Author: Sonu Sood; Meena Iyer
- Language: English
- Publisher: Penguin publishers
- Publication date: December 2020
- Publication place: India
- Media type: print
- Pages: 215
- ISBN: 0143451987

I Am No Messiah is a memoir written by Indian actor and social worker Sonu Sood, and co-written by Meena Iyer. The book was first released in December 2020 by Penguin publishers. In 2020, Sonu Sood, during the COVID-19 lockdown in India, helped thousands of stranded migrant workers, students etc. to return home, and was dubbed as "Messiah of migrants" for his work. In this autobiographical book he chronicled his experiences, and also narrated his journey from Moga to Mumbai, and his struggle in Bollywood and in South India to become an actor.

== Synopsis ==
In this book Sonu Sood narrates his journey from being an actor to a dedicated and altruistic social worker. In this book, he narrates the story of his life in details. He was born in a Punjabi family in Moga. He did his schooling in Moga and completed his engineering in Nagpur. After that instead of becoming an engineer he decided to try his luck as an actor. Initially he takes a job in Delhi for a few months. Then he moves to Mumbai and his life as a struggling actor begins. After several years of struggle, he manages to get a break in a Tamil film. After the film became successful gradually he gets offers from Kannada, Tamil, Telugu and later Hindi films.

In mid-2020, during the COVID-19 lockdown in India (first wave), Sood helped thousands of stranded Indian migrant workers to reach their homes. He named this mission Ghar Bhejo (transl. Sending back to home). He and his team arranged buses, special trains, and chartered flights to send the migrant labourers.

On 15 April 2020, around twenty days after the first lockdown started in India, Sood went to Kalwa Chowk, in Thane to provide food, drinking water, sanitisers etc. to the stranded migrant workers. A few people there asked him if they could be given more than one food packet. After inquiring he quickly understood the reason that the labourers were actually starting their journey of hundreds of kilometers to Karnataka and other states by walk (as there was no other option to travel during the lockdown). At this moment he understood that just handing over food packets, or sanitisers was not enough. That day he could send off 350 people to Karnataka, however there were thousands of others around waiting for help. That's how he started his mission and gradually he rediscovered himself as a humanitarian. He was able to send 12000 migrant workers to their home through his ‘Ghar Bhejo‘ campaign and under his leadership, the Sood Charity Foundation was able to make arrangements for another 45,000 people!

As he continues to work on the Ghar Bhejo initiative, he and his team understand there was a lot more work to be done. In the book, he also narrates other initiatives which they started gradually such as helping farmers, or helping poor people to get medical services or to undergo surgeries etc.

== Controversy ==
After the publication of the book, Sonu Sood was trolled for the title of the book. In the first few days, there were many negative reviews on Amazon criticising the book as "ghostwritten". Some others told that Sood was trying to establish himself as a "messiah", although he had no such title officially. Very soon Amazon turned off reviewing option for this book citing "unusual reviewing activity". Sood denied the accusations stating that those were "paid trolls".
