= Raj Bharath (actor) =

Indian actor

- Born: 1988 (age 37–38)
- Occupation: Actor
- Years active: 2013-present

Raj Bharath is an Indian actor who has appeared in Tamil language films.

== Career ==
Raj Bharath is the son of Malliyam Rajagopal, a film director and producer, who had been active in the 1970s. Raj Bharath briefly worked with Infosys. He handed out his portfolio to prominent directors, before gaining an opportunity to portray a small role in Sasi's Ainthu Ainthu Ainthu as an assistant to the villainous character portrayed by Sudesh Berry. Director Mysskin cast him as a villain in a wheelchair in the thriller Onaayum Aattukkuttiyum (2013), which Raj Bharath described as an "important breakthrough".

== Filmography ==
Year	Film	Role	Notes
2013	Ainthu Ainthu Ainthu	Nikhil	
2013	Onaayum Aattukkuttiyum	Thamba	
2016	Natpathigaram 79	Jeeva	
2017	Richie	Raghu	
2018	Andhra Mess	Rathna	
2019	Sigai	Prasath	Released on ZEE5
2019	Gurkha	Thyagu	
