= Black Sheep (web series) =

- Genre: Comedy, Drama
- Written by: Bhargav Prasad
- Directed by: Vivek Krishna Ramanujam, Naveen Kumar
- Starring: Shyam Renganathan; Vaishwath Shankar; Sindhuri Nandakumar; Janaki Sabesh; Jeeva Ravi
- Music by: Kaber + Tenma, Sathish Raghunathan
- Opening theme: Naa Enna Muttala
- Country of origin: India
- Original language: English
- No. of seasons: 1+
- No. of episodes: 8

Production
- Producer: Mathivanan Rajendran
- Cinematography: Niketh Bommi
- Editor: Dorai
- Running time: 15–30 minutes
- Production company: Stray Factory

Original release
- Network: YouTube
- Release: 5 June – 30 August 2016

Black Sheep is an Indian web series created by Stray Factory. The first season consists of eight episodes and premiered online on Rascalas.

== Plot summary ==
This coming of age show, chronicles the life of Shyam Rajendran a student at an engineering college who has trouble completing his degree. He decides to drop out and decides to become a Stand up Comic, much to the disapproval of his father, a Colonel in the army.

== Cast ==
- Shyam Renganathan as Shyam (8 episodes)
- Sindhuri Nandhakumar as Pratyusha (8 episodes)
- Vaishwath Shankar as Nikhil (8 episodes)
- Janaki Sabesh as Mom (5 episodes)
- Jeeva Ravi as Dad (5 episodes)
