= Revelations (2016 film) =

Indian drama film

- Poster
- Directed by: Vijay Jayapal
- Written by: Vijay Jayapal
- Produced by: Vijay Jayapal
- Starring: Chetan; Lakshmi Priyaa Chandramouli
- Cinematography: Jayanth Mathavan
- Edited by: Sai Arun
- Music by: Shamanth
- Release dates: October 2016 (Busan); 17 March 2017 (Ashvita Bistro, Chennai)
- Country: India
- Languages: Tamil; English

Revelations is a 2016 Indian Tamil-language independent drama film directed by Vijay Jayapal and starring Chetan and Lakshmi Priyaa Chandramouli. The film follows four people's lives in Kolkata. The film was screened at the Busan International Film Festival in 2016.

== Cast ==
- Chetan
- Lakshmi Priyaa Chandramouli
- Anantharaman Karthik
- Arpita Banerjee

== Production ==
The film was shot in mid-2016.

== Reception ==
A critic from Ananda Vikatan wrote that the film was a world film made in Tamil. A critic wrote that "Revelations, directed by Vijay Jayapal, was a movie with an impressive structure that deftly handled complicated thoughts and emotions". A reviewer from Kumudam wrote that Lakshmi Priya's usual acting is none other than that from the opening scenes to the end, there are tougher and tougher scenes. The critic added that without editing, the commercial film genre is going to stop and relax. They also said "there are very few dialogues in the film's story and Chetan and Lakshmi's acting in it is unique in its short duration".
