= R. Amarendran =

Indian theatre director and actor

- Occupations: Theatre director, actor
- Years active: 1980s–present

R. Amarendran (also known as Amarendran Ramanan or Amar) is an Indian theatre director and actor who has directed and acted in several plays in English and French staged in Chennai and Pondicherry.

== Career ==
R. Amarendran's love for acting started in the 1980s when he was a college student. He took part in the Loyola college production of Girish Karnad's Tughlaq which soon led him to get minor roles in Mithran Devanesan's Gilbert and Sullivan musicals in Chennai, India. He later acted in English plays for several theatre groups in Chennai. In 1989 he was one of four Indians to be selected by the French government to go the L'ecole Nationale d'art Dramatique at the Theatre National de Strasbourg in France to train in acting and to act in a French play that was staged in Delhi, Calcutta and Strasbourg. On his return from France he decided to direct plays himself and in 1992 he founded the Theatre Arlequin. He staged more than 25 plays in English and French the most notable of which were Tartuffe by Molière, The Lesson by Eugène Ionesco, The Maids by Jean Genet and Tony Kushner's adaptation of Pierre Corneille's L'Illusion Comique.

His film career started in 2008 when he landed a role in the movie Bale Pandya (2010) directed by Siddharth Chandrasekhar. Since then he has acted in negative, mad scientist and professor roles. He also played the role of the history teacher in the Hollywood film Life of Pi (2012). He has acted in a major role in the critically acclaimed Vidiyum Munn (2013), which was inspired by the British film London to Brighton. He was a supporting actor yet he played an impactful role. Amarendran is also a story writer and his first children's book in English Siri's Smile, written in 2011, has been translated into several Indian languages. He is a children's author who through his writing has explored his childhood memories and has created a small, cheerful world for his young readers. One of his other book is Salim The Knife-Sharpener (2015), which is also a children's book.

His other roles are in Jil Jung Juk (2016), Kabali (2016) and Vikram Vedha (2017).

== Plays ==
| Title | Playwright | Performed in | Contribution | Remarks |
|---|---|---|---|---|
| Tartuffe | Molière | English | Director | |
| The Lesson | Eugène Ionesco | English | Director | |
| The Maids | Jean Genet | English | Director | |
| L'Illusion Comique | Pierre Corneille | English | Director | Tony Kushner's adaptation |
| Tughlaq | Girish Karnad | English | Actor | |
| The doctor in spite of himself | Molière | French | Director | Performed at Alliance Francaise of Madras |

== Filmography ==
Key
| † | Denotes films that are to be released soon |

| Year | Film | Role | Notes |
|---|---|---|---|
| 2010 | Bale Pandiya | AKP | |
| 2010 | Va | Gnani | |
| 2012 | Life of Pi | History teacher | |
| 2013 | Vidiyum Munn | Saloon Singaram | |
| 2015 | Yatchan | Jack the travel fixer | |
| 2016 | Jil Jung Juk | Deivanayagam | |
| 2016 | Kabali | Velu | |
| 2017 | Sangili Bungili Kadhava Thorae | Singapore Singaaram | |
| 2017 | Vikram Vedha | Sangu | |
| 2017 | Maayavan | Pramodh | |
| 2018 | Andhra Mess | Janardhanan | |
| 2022 | Ward 126 | | |
