= Nirvana Inn =

- Directed by: Vijay Jayapal
- Written by: Vijay Jayapal
- Produced by: Harsh Agarwal; Aditya Grover; Manoj Poosappan; Mathivanan Rajendran; Stephen Zacharias
- Starring: Adil Hussain; Rajshri Deshpande; Sandhya Mridul; Saandeep Mahaajan
- Cinematography: Jayanth Mathavan
- Production companies: Stray Factory; Uncombed Buddha; Stop Whinging; Harman Ventures
- Release dates: 6 October 2019 (Busan); 11 December 2020
- Running time: 115 min
- Country: India
- Language: Hindi

Nirvana Inn is a 2019 Indian Hindi-language psychological horror film directed by Vijay Jayapal and produced by Stray Factory, Uncombed Buddha, Stop Whinging and Harman Ventures. The film stars Adil Hussain, Rajshri Deshpande, Sandhya Mridul. and Saandeep Mahaajan. It follows the story of a boatman who becomes the caretaker of a Himalayan resort after an attempted suicide.

Nirvana Inn was one of the 29 projects selected for the program, Busan Asian Project Market at the Busan International Film Festival. It premiered under the "A Window on Asian Cinema" section at the 24th Busan International Film Festival. The film was released on OTT platform Cinemapreneur on 11 December 2020.

== Cast ==
- Adil Hussain as Jogiraj Chakraborty
- Rajshri Deshpande as Mohini
- Sandhya Mridul as Leela
- Saandeep Mahaajan as Husband

== Production ==
Director Vijay Jayapal said that the idea of the film came to his mind after reading an article about the Germanwings Flight 9525 crash where the pilot had crashed the plane, since he was having some suicidal thoughts. He said, "I was quite intrigued and disturbed by this story and the underlying themes of death and guilt." He then worked on the story for the next year and a half with an idea to make The Shining meets Winter Sleep. Principal photography began in October 2018 in Manali, Himachal Pradesh and Kerala. Talking about the films title, Vijay said "[it] was a deliberate choice of title. It refers to the cycle of birth and death and reincarnation."

Jayapal had heard a series of strange growls from the roof on a resort in Kerala where he was on a family trip. He decided to use them in the film to show the character's guilt. He said, "You don't know whether the growling is real or just in his mind. It's meant to amplify his fear." After scouting for locations in Lonavala and Uttarakhand, Jayapal settled for a hotel in Manali for the film's setting. He wrote the dialogues of the film in a mix of Hindi and Assamese feeling that the "story determines the language because language is the tool used to communicate the story." Most of the scenes in the film were shot during the day of Manali's winter in 2018. The film ran out of funds for the post production process when they received a grant from the Asian Cinema Fund, with which he finished the film's sound mixing and colour grading.

== Reception ==
Anupam Kant Verma of First Post wrote, "Adil Hussain-starrer works best when exploring its protagonist's tortured psyche."

Arunkumar Shekhar of The New Indian Express wrote, "A thriller at a surface level that is wholly enjoyable for the way it uses a lot of Hitchcockian elements in the script like Tamil films and serials of yore."
