= Ravichandran (Tamil film director) =

Indian film director

- Born: 17 March 1971 (age 55); Tamil Nadu, India
- Occupation: Film director
- Years active: 1998–present

Ravichandran is an Indian film director, who has directed Tamil films. After making his debut in 1998 with the successful Kannedhirey Thondrinal, he has gone on to make other ventures including Sandhitha Velai and Majunu.

== Career ==
Ravichandran made his debut by directing Kannedhirey Thondrinal (1998), a love story featuring Prashanth and Simran, and the film gained positive reviews from critics and went on to become a commercial success. His next Sandhitha Velai fared less well, while his third venture Majunu saw him collaborate with Prashanth again. Through the film, he also introduced music director Harris Jayaraj to work on his first film soundtrack, though other projects eventually released earlier.

His most recent release was Urchagam, a thriller starring Nandha and Sherin, which opened to average reviews in 2007. In 2014, he announced that he is working on a movie featuring his nephew Raj Bharath and Amzhath in lead roles.

== Filmography ==
Year	Film	Notes
1998	Kannedhirey Thondrinal	
2000	Sandhitha Velai	
2001	Majunu	
2007	Urchagam	
2016	Natpadhigaram 79	
