= Im Heung-soon =

South Korean filmmaker (born 1969)

- Born: 1969; Seoul, South Korea
- Occupation(s): Artist and Filmmaker
- Known for: Im is known for second film, Factory Complex, 2014 premiered at the Wide Angle Feature Documentary section of 2014 Busan International Film Festival and won the Silver Lion Award at the 56th Venice Biennale 2015.

Korean name
- Hangul: 임흥순
- RR: Im Heungsun
- MR: Im Hŭngsun
- Website: http://imheungsoon.com/

Im Heung-soon (Korean: 임흥순; born 1969) is a South Korean artist and filmmaker. He lives and works in Seoul. Im is an artist and filmmaker whose work focus on explored the lives of people who are marginalized in social, political, capitalist and national contexts.

His politically charged yet emotional resonant works are embodied through various visual mediums such as photography, installations, public art, community art, and films.

His second feature film, Factory Complex (2014), premiered in the Wide Angle Feature Documentary section at the 2014 Busan International Film Festival and received recognition at multiple festivals after winning the Silver Lion Award at the 56th who won the Silver Lion award at the 2015 Venice Biennale

His works have been exhibited, among others, at the MMCA, Seoul (2017, 2018), HKW, Berlin (2017), Pompidou Center Paris (2016), Lincoln Center, NY (2015) The National Art Center, Tokyo (2015), Sharjah Biennale (2015) and MOMA PS1, New York (2015).

== Selected exhibitions ==
- 57th Carnegie International, 2018
- "Kaesong Industrial Complex", Culture Station Seoul, 2018
- "Im Heung-soon_Things that Do Us Part_Belief, Faith, Love, Betrayal, Hatred, Fear, Ghost", National Museum of Modern and Contemporary Art, Seoul, 2017-2018
- "Reincarnation", MoMA PS1, 2015
