= Nasir (film) =

2020 film

- Directed by: Arun Karthick
- Produced by: Mathivanan Rajendran
- Starring: Koumarane Valavane; Sudha Ranganathan
- Cinematography: Saumyananda Sahi
- Edited by: Arghya Basu
- Production companies: Stray Factory Rinkel Film, Uncombed Buddha, Magic Hour Films, Colored Pickle Films, Harman Ventures
- Release date: 27 January 2020 (Rotterdam)
- Running time: 75 min
- Country: India
- Language: Tamil

Nasir is a 2020 Tamil-language drama film directed by Arun Karthick and is an Indo-Dutch co-production between Stray Factory, Rinkel Film, Uncombed Buddha, Magic Hour Films, Colored Pickle film & Harman Ventures. The Hollywood Reporter described the film as "An observational chronicle of one seemingly ordinary day in the life of a seemingly ordinary sari salesman in the southern city of Coimbatore," with a focus on tolerance and human values. The movie's poster is inspired by the outline of Gandhipuram.

Nasir was the recipient of the Hubert Bals Fund in 2018. The film premiered at the International Film Festival of Rotterdam in Tiger Competition and won the NETPAC award for Best Asian Film premiering at the Festival It also bagged the Grand Prix at the 14th Andrei Tarkovsky Zerkalo International Film Festival, Russia. It won the Golden Wood in the Asian Arthouse Film Festival, 2021, Kolkata.

== Cast ==
- Koumarane Valavane as Nasir
- Sudha Ranganathan as Tal
- Yasmin Rahman as Mother
- Sabari as Nephew
- Bakkiyam Sankar as Coworker
- Rajesh as Salesboy
- Jensan Diwakar as Coworker
- Nivedhitha as Coworker
- Prasanna as Cashier
- Vikramadityan Nambi as Playboy
- Bharath Rawal as Shop Owner
- Prabanchan as Dhasthagir
- Saimathi as Dhasthagir's wife
- Rifa as Schoolboy
- Saahithyaa as Schoolgirl
- Abdul Jaffar as Rahman
- Meena as Cashier's wife
- Valli Revathi as Customer
- Balasubramanian as Watchman
- Sharadha as Night Food Seller
- Jaikumar as Night Food Seller
- Gayathri as Customer
- Umavathi as Water-Taking Woman

== Reception ==
On the review aggregator website Rotten Tomatoes, 100% of 6 critics' reviews are positive, with an average rating of 7/10.

Saibal Chatterjee of NDTV gave 4/5 stars and wrote, "Nasir is a heartfelt ode to a man who deserves better - and, by extension, to all humans who do." Kirubhakar Purushothaman of Cinema Express gave 4/5 stars and wrote, "It would be easy to box Nasir as parallel cinema or as an arthouse film but that would be unfortunate. Nasir is an intense story of our land told through an embrace of the cinematic language. It’s no surprise that this film is resonating across the world."

Jay Weissberg of Variety wrote, "'Nasir' is a superb example of what can be done on a tiny budget when the vision is strong, the script is low-key, and the performers privilege rapport and naturalism over dramatic flourishes." Neil Young of Hollywood Reporter wrote, "A quiet plea for tolerance and an assertion of humanistic values in an era where such things can no longer be taken for granted, Nasir is all the more touching for its scrupulous avoidance of sentimentality and manipulation. The quietest voices, it reminds us, can often make the most penetrating, memorable impact."

Namrata Joshi of The Hindu wrote, "An adaptation of Dilip Kumar’s short, A Clerk’s Story , the 75-minute film is pithy, terse, impactful and contemplative, specially the abrupt note on which it ends. Despite it moving languidly towards the direction you might have guessed it would take, it doesn’t feel ominous in the build up. You could still be nursing a sliver of hope even as Nasir marches on mercilessly to the chronicle of the end of secularism, harmony, peace and tolerance. It pierces, stings, aches and shatters all the more for that."
