= 24th Busan International Film Festival =

2019 edition of film festival

- BIFF official poster
- Opening film: The Horse Thieves. Roads of Time
- Closing film: Moonlit Winter
- Location: Busan Cinema Center
- Founded: 1995
- Awards: New Currents Award; Haifa Street; Rom; Kim Jiseok Awards; Circus of Life; Korean Cinema Award; Bae Yong-jae; Yoo Dong-suk; The Asian Filmmaker of the Year; Hirokazu Kore-eda
- Festival date: Opening: October 3, 2019; Closing: October 12, 2019

Busan International Film Festival
- 25th 23rd

The 24th Busan International Film Festival was held from October 3 to October 12, 2019 at the Busan Cinema Center in Busan, South Korea. A total of 299 films from 85 countries were screened at the festival, including 118 world premieres and 27 international premieres.

A new "Icons" section was created to introduce the latest films made by iconic filmmakers from around the world in order to focus on both the directors and their works. The Wide Angle section on Animation Showcase and Cinekids have been integrated into A Window on Asian Cinema and World Cinema sections.

This Busan International Film Festival also screened 10 of the most historically meaningful and remarkable classic films to commemorate the centennial anniversary of the Korean cinema. Korean cinema had become the fifth-largest player in the world film industry based on the number of box office admissions, according to the UNESCO Institute for Statistics.

== Program ==
=== Opening ===
- The Horse Thieves. Roads of Time - Yerlan NURMUKHAMBETOV, Lisa Takeba (Kazakhstan/Japan)

=== Gala Presentation ===
- Coming Home Again - Wayne Wang (United States/Korea)
- Gloria Mundi - Robert Guédiguian (France/Italy)
- The King - David Michôd (United Kingdom/Hungary/Australia)
- The Truth - Hirokazu Kore-eda (France/Japan)

=== Icons ===
- Adults in the Room - Costa-Gavras (France/Greece)
- Devil Between the Legs - Arturo Ripstein (Mexico/Spain)
- Family Romance, LLC - Werner Herzog (United States)
- Guest of Honour - Atom Egoyan (Canada)
- The Halt - Lav Diaz (Philippines)
- It Must Be Heaven - Elia Suleiman (France/Qatar/Germany/Canada/Turkey/Palestine)
- Joan of Arc - Bruno Dumont (France)
- Marghe and Her Mother - Mohsen Makhmalbaf (Italy/United Kingdom)
- Matthias & Maxime - Xavier Dolan (Canada/France)
- Mindanao - Brillante Mendoza (Philippines)
- Mr. Jones - Agnieszka Holland (Poland/Ukraine/United Kingdom)
- Parasite - Bong Joon-ho (Korea)
- Sorry We Missed You - Ken Loach (United Kingdom)
- The Traitor - Marco Bellocchio (Italy/France/Germany/Brazil)
- To the Ends of the Earth - Kiyoshi Kurosawa (Japan/Uzbekistan/Qatar)
- Vitalina Varela - Pedro Costa (Portugal)
- Volare - Gabriele Salvatores (Italy)
- Wasp Network - Olivier Assayas (France/Brazil/Spain)
- Zombi Child - Bertrand Bonello (France)

=== A Window on Asian Cinema ===
- A Dark-Dark Man - Adilkhan Yerzhanov (Kazakhstan/France)
- A Sun - Chung Mong-hong (Taiwan)
- Aadhaar - Suman Ghosh (India)
- African Violet - Mona Zandi Haghighi (Iran)
- Ama Khando - Dhondup Tsering Gurung (Nepal)
- Balloon - Pema Tseden (China)
- Bitter Chestnut - Gurvinder Singh (India)
- Bombay Rose - Gitanjali Rao (India/United Kingdom/France/Qatar)
- The Cave - Tom Waller (Thailand)
- Changfeng Town - Wang Jing (China/Singapore)
- Children of the Sun - Prasanna Vithanage (Sri Lanka/India)
- Cinema Donkey - Shahed AHMADLOU (Iran)
- Circus of Life - Sarmad Khoosat (Pakistan)
- Dear Devil Brother - VU Ngoc Phuong (Vietnam)
- Dolly Kitty and Those Twinkling Stars - Alankrita Shrivastava (India)
- Dwelling In The Fuchun Mountains - GU Xiaogang (China)
- Fagara - Heiward Mak (Hong Kong, China)
- The Gangs, The Oscars, and The Walking Dead - KAO Pin-Chuan (Taiwan)
- The Garden of Evening Mists - Tom Shu-Yu LIN (Malaysia)
- Goodbye Mother - TRINH Dinh Le Minh (Vietnam)
- Hava, Maryam, Ayesha - Sahraa KARIMI (Afghanistan)
- Heavy Craving - HSIEH Pei-Ju (Taiwan)
- Home Sweet Home - TRAN HUU TAN (Vietnam)
- Iewduh - Pradip Kurbah (India)
- It Stopped Raining - NAKAGAWA Ryutaro (Japan)
- Jallikkattu - Lijo Jose Pellissery (India)
- Krabi, 2562 - Ben Rivers, Anocha Suwichakornpong (United Kingdom/Thailand)
- Lingua Franca - Isabel SANDOVAL (United States/Philippines)
- The Long Walk - Mattie Do (Laos/Spain/Singapore)
- Lunana: A Yak in the Classroom - Pawo Choyning DORJI (Bhutan)
- Maadathy, An Unfairy Tale - Leena Manimekalai (India/Singapore/France)
- Mariam - Sharipa URAZBAYEVA (Kazakhstan)
- The Murders of Oiso - MISAWA Takuya (Japan/Hong Kong, China/Korea)
- Nina Wu - Midi Z (Taiwan/Malaysia/Myanmar)
- Nirvana Inn - Vijay Jayapal (India)
- No.7 Cherry Lane - Yonfan (Hong Kong, China)
- The Orphanage - Shahrbanoo Sadat (Denmark/Germany/France/Luxembourg/Afghanistan)
- The Perfect Candidate - Haifaa al-Mansour (Germany/Saudi Arabia)
- The Promised Land - Takahisa Zeze (Japan)
- Roam Rome Mein - Tannishtha Chatterjee (India/Italy)
- Saturday Afternoon - Mostofa Sarwar Farooki (Bangladesh/Germany)
- The Science of Fictions - Yosep ANGGI NOEN (Indonesia/Malaysia/France)
- Secrets of the Wind - Quang Binh NGUYEN PHAN (Vietnam)
- Seven and a Half - Navid MAHMOUDI (Afghanistan/Iran)
- Sisterhood - NISHIHARA Takashi (Japan)
- Spring Follows Winter - LIU Junfeng (China)
- Suddenly a Tree - Safi YAZDANIAN (Iran)
- Suk Suk - Ray Yeung (Hong Kong, China)
- Talking the Pictures - Masayuki Suo (Japan)
- They Say Nothing Stays the Same - Joe Odagiri (Japan)
- Verdict - Raymund RIBAY GUTIERREZ (Philippines)
- The Wayfarers - Goutam Ghose (India)
- When the Moon Was Full - Narges Abyar (Iran)
- Where We Belong - Kongdej Jaturanrasamee (Thailand)
- Wild Sparrow - SHIH Li (Taiwan)

=== New Currents ===
- A Road to Spring - LI Ji (China)
- Among the Hills - Mohammadreza KEIVANFAR (Iran)
- An Old Lady - LIM Sun-ae (Korea)
- Boluomi - LAU Kek Huat, Vera CHEN (Taiwan)
- Diapason - Hamed TEHRANI (Iran)
- The Education - KIM Dukjoong (Korea)
- Haifa Street - Mohanad HAYAL (Iraq/Qatar)
- John Denver Trending - Arden Rod CONDEZ (Philippines)
- Just Like That - Kislay KISLAY (India)
- Lucky Monster - BONG Joon-young (Korea)
- My Identity - SUZUKI Sae (Japan)
- Over the Sea - SUN Aoqian (China)
- Rom - TRAN THANH Huy (Vietnam)
- Running to the Sky - Mirlan ABDYKALYKOV (Kyrgyzstan)

=== Korean Cinema Today - Panorama ===
- Another Child - Kim Yoon-seok (Korea)
- Baseball Girl - CHOI Yuntae (Korea)
- Birthday - LEE Jong-un (Korea)
- Exit - LEE Sang-geun (Korea)
- Extreme Job - Lee Byeong-heon (Korea)
- Family Affair - Lee Dong-eun (Korea)
- GANG - JO Bareun (Korea)
- Hotel by the River - Hong Sang-soo (Korea)
- I Am Home - PARK Je-bum (Korea)
- Light for the Youth - Shin Su-won (Korea)
- Not in This World - Park Jung-bum (Korea)
- Our Village - KO Bongsoo, KO Minsoo (Korea)
- Paper Flower - KOH Hoon (Korea)
- Princess Aya - LEE Seong-gang (Korea)
- Tune in for Love - Jung Ji-woo (Korea)
- Vertigo - JEON Gye-soo (Korea)

=== Korean Cinema Today - Vision ===
- Eunmi - JEONG Jeeyeong (Korea)
- HEART - JEONG Ga-young (Korea)
- The Hill of Wind - Park Suk-young (Korea)
- Kyungmi's World - KOO Jihyun (Korea)
- Lucky Chan-sil - Cho-hee KIM (Korea)
- Moving On - YOON Danbi (Korea)
- The Pregnant Tree and the Goblin - KIM Dongryung, PARK Kyoungtae (Korea)
- RUBY - PARK Hanjin (Korea)
- Way Back Home - PARK Sunjoo (Korea)
- We Gon' Be Alright - PARK Minkook (Korea)

=== Korean Cinema Retrospective ===
==== Director of Photography Jung Il-sung ====
- Born to Kill - JANG Hyun-soo (Korea)
- Hwang Jin-ie - Bae Chang-ho (Korea)
- Late Autumn - Kim Soo-yong (Korea)
- Mandara - Im Kwon-taek (Korea)
- Son of Man - Yu Hyun-mok (Korea)
- The Last Witness - Lee Doo-yong (Korea)
- Woman of Fire - Kim Ki-young (Korea)

=== World Cinema ===
- #iamhere - Éric Lartigau (France)
- A Certain Kind of Silence - Michal HOGENAUER (Czech Republic/Netherlands/Latvia)
- A Tale of Three Sisters - Emin Alper (Turkey/Germany/Netherlands/Greece)
- A White, White Day - Hlynur PALMASON (Iceland/Denmark/Sweden)
- Agnes Joy - Silja Hauksdottir (Iceland)
- Alice and the Mayor - Nicolas Pariser (France)
- Antigone - Sophie Deraspe (Canada)
- Arab Blues - Manele LABIDI (France)
- Beanpole - Kantemir Balagov (Russia)
- Beware of Children - Dag Johan Haugerud (Norway/Sweden)
- Boy Meets Gun - Joost VAN HEZIK (Netherlands)
- Calm with Horses - Nick ROWLAND (Ireland/United Kingdom)
- Corpus Christi - Jan Komasa (Poland/France)
- Daffodils - David STUBBS (New Zealand)
- Deerskin - Quentin Dupieux (France)
- Dogs Don't Wear Pants - Jukka-Pekka VALKEAPÄÄ (Finland/Latvia)
- Electric Girl - Ziska RIEMANN (Germany/Belgium)
- Ema - Pablo Larraín (Chile)
- Fire Will Come - Oliver Laxe (Spain/France/Luxembourg)
- The Good Intentions - Ana GARCÍA BLAYA (Argentina)
- Hearts and Bones - Ben Lawrence (Australia)
- I Am Woman - Unjoo Moon (Australia)
- I Lost My Body - Jérémy CLAPIN (France)
- I Was at Home, But - Angela Schanelec (Germany/Serbia)
- Ivana the Terrible - Ivana MLADENOVIC (Romania/Serbia)
- Let There Be Light (2019 film) - Marko Škop (Slovak Republic/Czech Republic)
- Liberté - Albert Serra (France/Spain/Portugal)
- Little Joe - Jessica Hausner (Austria/United Kingdom/Germany)
- Love Trilogy: Chained - Yaron SHANI (Israel/Germany)
- Love Trilogy: Reborn - Yaron SHANI (Israel/Germany)
- Love Trilogy: Stripped - Yaron SHANI (Israel/Germany)
- Marriage Story - Noah Baumbach (United States)
- Maternal - Maura Delpero (Italy/Argentina)
- The Mayor of Rione Sanità - Mario Martone (Italy)
- Measure for Measure - Paul Ireland (Australia)
- Ms. Purple - Justin Chon (United States)
- Oleg - Juris KURSIETIS (Latvia)
- On a Magical Night - Christophe Honoré (France/Belgium/Luxembourg)
- Our Mothers - César DÍAZ (Guatemala/Belgium/France)
- Particles - Blaise HARRISON (France/Switzerland)
- Port Authority - Danielle Lessovitz (United States/France)
- Portrait of a Lady on Fire - Céline Sciamma (France)
- The Prince - Sebastian MUÑOZ (Chile/Argentina/Belgium)
- Psychosia - Marie GRAHTØ (Denmark/Finland)
- Rest in Greece - Florian GOTTSCHICK (Greece/Germany/Austria)
- Rialto - Peter MACKIE BURNS (Ireland/United Kingdom)
- Rocks - Sarah Gavron (United Kingdom)
- The Sharks - Lucía GARIBALDI (Uruguay/Argentina/Spain)
- Sibyl - Justine Triet (France/Belgium)
- The Sleepwalkers - Paula Hernández (Argentina/Uruguay)
- Sole - Carlo SIRONI (Italy/Poland)
- The Son - Ines TANOVIC (Bosnia and Herzegovina/Croatia/Romania/Slovenia/Montenegro)
- The Song of Names - François Girard (Canada/Hungary)
- South Terminal - Rabah AMEUR ZAIMECHE (France/Qatar)
- The Swamp's Silence - Marc VIGIL (Spain)
- Synonyms - Nadav Lapid (France/Israel/Germany)
- Technoboss - JOÃO NICOLAU (Portugal/France)
- Those Who Remained - Barnabás TÓTH (Hungary)
- Through Ernesto's Eyes - Ana Luiza AZEVEDO (Brazil)
- Tijuana Bible - Jean-Charles HUE (France/Mexico)
- Tlamess - Ala Eddine SLIM (Tunisia/France)
- Truth and Justice - Tanel Toom (Estonia)
- The Two Popes - Fernando Meirelles (Italy/Argentina)
- The Unknown Saint - Alaa Eddine ALJEM (Morocco/France)
- The Voice - Ognjen Sviličić (Croatia/Macedonia/Serbia)
- White Lie - Yonah Lewis and Calvin Thomas
- White on White - Théo COURT (Spain/Chile/Germany/France)
- You Will Die at 20 - Amjad ABU ALALA (Sudan/France/Egypt/Norway/Germany/Qatar)

=== Flash Forward ===
- 5 Is the Perfect Number - Igort (Italy/Belgium/France)
- The Accidental Rebel - Randa Chahoud (Germany/United Kingdom)
- Carturan - Liviu Săndulescu (Romania/Sweden)
- Chronology - Ali Aydın (Turkey/Germany)
- Fabulous - Mélanie Charbonneau (Canada)
- Great Poetry - Alexander Lungin (Russia)
- Los Lobos - Samuel Kishi Leopo (Mexico)
- Motherland - Tomas Vengris (Lithuania/Latvia/Germany/Greece)
- O Fim do Mundo - Basil Da Cunha (Switzerland)
- Paradise - Davide Del Degan (Italy/Slovenia)
- Savage - Sam Kelly (New Zealand)
- Son of Ox - Haroldo Borges, Ernesto Molinero (Brazil)
- Valley of Souls - Nicolás Rincón Gille (Colombia/Belgium/Brazil/France)

=== Wide Angle ===
==== Korean Short Film Competition ====
- AKA 5JO - LEE Kyeong-won (Korea)
- Fruits - YANG Jae-joon (Korea)
- Hello - JIN Seong-moon (Korea)
- How are you, Joo-hee - CHOI Min-goo (Korea)
- Jesa - SONG Kyungwon (United States/Korea)
- Joan - KIM Jisan, YOO Jungsoo (Korea)
- My Little Television - LI Hongmei (Korea)
- Nose - YOON Hanna (Korea)
- Snail Man - PARK Jae-beom (Korea)
- Starex - ROH Dohyeon (Korea)
- The Dog Days - LEE Haeun (Korea)
- While you play - KIM Kyungrae (Korea)

==== Asian Short Film Competition ====
- BASURERO - Eileen CABILING (Philippines/United States)
- Birdland - KOGAHARA Takeshi (Japan)
- Dragon's Tail - Saeed KESHAVARZ (Iran)
- In This Land We′re Briefly Ghosts - Chen-Wen LO (Taiwan/Myanmar)
- KALAM - Prabin Kumar RAWAT (Nepal)
- Maulen - Darina MANAPOVA (Kazakhstan)
- No One is Crazy in This Town - Wregas BHANUTEJA (Indonesia)
- Reprise - Stanley XU (Taiwan/Singapore)
- Shooting Ms Rena's Film! - Elvin ADIGOZEL (Azerbaijan/France)
- Sweet, Salty - DUONG Dieu Linh (Vietnam)

==== Short Film Showcase ====
- Erotica - Gavin Lin (Taiwan)
- Knock Knock Knock - Sudhanshu Saria (India)
- Piece of Meat - Huang Junxiang, Jerrold CHONG (Singapore)
- Roqaia - Diana Saqeb JAMAL (Afghanistan/Bangladesh)
- Stay Awake, Be Ready - PHAM THIEN An (Vietnam/Korea/United States)

==== Documentary Competition ====
- book-paper-scissors - HIROSE Nanako (Japan)
- Come and See - Nottapon BOONPRAKOB (Thailand)
- Flag, Blue Sky, Party - JANG Yun-mi (Korea)
- Letters to Buriram - OH Minwook (Korea)
- Noodle Kid - HUO Ning (China)
- The Taste of Secrets - Guillaume Suon (Cambodia/France)
- Underground - KIM Jeong-keun (Korea)
- The Unseen - Behzad NALBANDI (Iran)
- Welcome to X-world - HAN Taeee (Korea)
- Yellow Ribbon - JU Hyunsook (Korea)

==== Documentary Showcase ====
- The Cave - Feras Fayyad (Syria/Denmark)
- The Cordillera of Dreams - Patricio Guzmán (Chile/France)
- HAMBA - BANG Sungjun (Korea)
- I AM A PILOT - KIM Daehyun (Korea)
- I BY YOU BY EVERYBODY - KIM Namsuk, CHOI Seung Yoon (Korea)
- M for Malaysia - Ineza ROUSSILLE, Dian LEE (Malaysia)
- The Men's Room - Petter SOMMER, Jo Vemund SVENDSEN (Norway)
- Mullah's Daughter - Hassan SOLHJOU, Mahdieh Sadat MIRHABIBI (Iran/United Kingdom)
- Musoon, Across the Universe - NAM Seung-suk (Korea)
- Narrow Red Line - Farzad KHOSHDAST (Iran)
- One Child Nation - Nanfu Wang, ZHANG Jialing (China/United States)
- Overseas - YOON Sung-A (Belgium/France)
- Pebble - Quentin QIAO (China)
- President's 7 Hours - LEE Sangho (Korea)
- Que Sea Ley (Let It Be Law) - Juan Diego Solanas (France/Argentina/Uruguay)
- Sacavém - Júlio ALVES (Portugal)
- Things That Do Us Part - Im Heung-soon (Korea)
- This is not a Documentary 2 - PARK Hong-yeol, HWANG Da-eun (Korea)
- Tiny Souls - Dina NASER (Jordan/France/Qatar/Lebanon)
- Transnistra - Anna EBORN (Sweden/Denmark/Belgium)
- Vulnerable Histories (A Road Movie) - TANAKA Koki (Japan)
- What Can You Do about It - TSUBOTA Yoshifumi(Japan)

=== Open Cinema ===
- 99 Songs - Vishwesh Krishnamoorthy (India)
- Jazzy Misfits - Nam Yeonwoo (Korea)
- Les Misérables - Ladj Ly (France)
- Looking Up - Deng Chao, Yu Baimei (China)
- Martin Eden - Pietro Marcello (Italy/France)
- The Sky Is Pink - Shonali Bose (India)

=== Special Programs in Focus ===
==== The 100 Year History of Korean Cinema: 10 Great Korean Films ====
- A Day Off - Lee Man-hee (Korea)
- Good Windy Days - Lee Jang-ho (Korea)
- An Aimless Bullet - Yu Hyun-mok (Korea)
- The Day a Pig Fell into the Well - Hong Sang-soo (Korea)
- The Housemaid - Kim Ki-young (Korea)
- The March of Fools - Ha Gil-jong (Korea)
- Memories of Murder - Bong Joon-ho (Korea)
- Oldboy - Park Chan-wook (Korea)
- Seopyeonje - Im Kwon-taek (Korea)
- Why Has Bodhi-Dharma Left for the East? - Bae Yong-kyun (Korea)

==== Gaze and Memories: Asia's Leading Women Filmmakers ====
- Earth - Deepa Mehta (Canada/India)
- Fire - Deepa Mehta (Canada/India)
- Forgetting Vietnam - Trinh T. Minh-ha (United States/Korea/Germany)
- Mukhsin - Yasmin Ahmad (Malaysia)
- Reassemblage - Trinh T. Minh-ha (Senegal/United States)
- Surname Viet Given Name Nam - Trinh T. Minh-ha (United States)
- Talentime - Yasmin Ahmad (Malaysia)
- Water - Deepa Mehta (Canada)

=== Busan Classic ===
- Aladin - Sing Hwat TAN (Indonesia)
- Mee Pok Man - Eric Khoo (Singapore)
- The Graduate - Mike Nichols (United States)
- The Red Snowball Tree - Vasily Shukshin (Russia)
- The Witness - Péter Bacsó (Hungary)

=== Midnight Passion ===
- Blood Quantum - Jeff Barnaby (Canada)
- Detention - John Hsu (Taiwan)
- First Love - Takashi Miike (Japan)
- Girl on the Third Floor - Travis Stevens (United States)
- Greener Grass - Jocelyn Deboer, Dawn Luebbe (United States)
- Vivarium - Lorcan Finnegan (Ireland/United States)

=== Closing ===
- Moonlit Winter - Lim Dae-hyung (Korea)

== Awards ==
- New Currents Award
  - Haifa Street - Mohanad HAYAL (Iraq/Qatar)
  - Rom - TRAN THANH Huy (Vietnam)
  - Special Mention : Just Like That - Kislay KISLAY (India)
- BIFF Mecenat Award
  - Noodle Kid - HUO Ning (China)
  - Underground - KIM Jeong-keun (Korea)
- Sonje Award
  - Dragon's Tail - Saeed KESHAVARZ (Iran)
  - Hello - JIN Seong-moon (Korea)
- Actor & Actress of the Year Award
  - Kim Jun-hyung - The Education (Korea)
  - Mun Hye-in - The Education (Korea)
- FIPRESCI Award
  - Running to the Sky - Mirlan ABDYKALYKOV (Kyrgyzstan)
- NETPAC Award
  - Moving On - YOON Danbi (Korea)
- Kim Jiseok Award
  - Circus of Life - Sarmad Khoosat (Pakistan)
  - Market - Pradip KURBAH (India)
- KNN Award
  - An Old Lady - LIM Sun-ae (Korea)
- Busan Bank Award
  - Fabulous - Mélanie CHARBONNEAU (Canada)
- Citizen Critics' Award
  - Moving On - YOON Danbi (Korea)
- Busan Cinephile Award
  - Que Sea Ley (Let It Be Law) - Juan Diego Solanas (France/Argentina/Uruguay)
- DGK Award
  - Moving On - YOON Danbi (Korea)
  - Lucky Chan-sil - Cho-hee KIM (Korea)
- CGV Arthouse Award
  - Lucky Chan-sil - Cho-hee KIM (Korea)
- KBS Independent Film Award
  - Lucky Chan-sil - Cho-hee KIM (Korea)
- KTH Award
  - Lucky Monster - BONG Joon-young (Korea)
  - Moving On - YOON Danbi (Korea)
- CGK&SamyangXEEN Award
  - Kyungmi's World - Cinematographer KIM Gilja (Korea)
- The Asian Filmmaker of the Year
  - Hirokazu Kore-eda (Japan)
- Korean Cinema Award
  - Bae Yongjae (Korea)
  - Yoo Dongsuk (Korea)
