= Kannedhirey Thondrinal =

1998 film by Ravichandran

- Poster
- Directed by: Ravichandran
- Written by: Story & Screenplay: Ravichandran; Dialogues: Sujatha
- Produced by: Sivasakthi Pandian
- Starring: Prashanth; Simran; Karan
- Cinematography: Thangar Bachan
- Edited by: B. Lenin; V. T. Vijayan
- Music by: Deva
- Production company: Sivasakthi Movie Makers
- Release date: 11 September 1998
- Running time: 153 minutes
- Country: India
- Language: Tamil

Kannedhirey Thondrinal (transl. She appeared before the eyes) is a 1998 Indian Tamil-language romantic drama film directed by newcomer Ravichandran. The film stars Prashanth and Simran. Karan, Vivek, Vaiyapuri and Ramji play supporting roles. It was the first collaboration of both Prashanth and Simran.

Kannedhirey Thondrinal was released on 11 September 1998, and was commercially successful. Owing to its success, the film was remade in Telugu as Manasulo Maata, in Kannada as Snehaloka, in Malayalam as Dhosth, in Bengali as Sangee, in Bangladeshi as Tumi Kato Sundor and in Marathi as Friends.

== Plot ==
Vasanth is the son of a prominent industrialist in Coimbatore. He enrolls in an engineering college in Chennai, where he butts heads with Shankar, a short-tempered and somewhat violent senior. Their animosity persists, but after Vasanth helps Shankar fight off a bunch of ruffians, they become best friends. Vasanth proves to be a calming influence on Shankar, who is impressed by Vasanth's humility, in spite of his vast wealth.

Shankar's family is something of a puzzle to Vasanth: upon receiving an invite to Shankar's house, Vasanth overhears Shankar's mother asking him why he invited visitors over. The cold reception upsets Vasanth, who makes up an excuse to leave to an embarrassed Shankar. In due course, Shankar's mother understands Vasanth's good nature and becomes very affectionate towards him.

In a side story, Vasanth chances upon a girl in the Coimbatore railway station one day. Smitten, he chases her and while she seems uninterested, he persists in his affections, eventually landing up in jail for eve-teasing after a misunderstanding with the police relating to their relationship, which she does not attempt to clear. The twist – the girl is revealed to be Priya, Shankar's younger sister, who in the face of Vasanth's decency upon his release – he does not reveal anything about her role in his imprisonment to Shankar or his mother, and withdraws from her life – discovers that she loves him too. They make up, but before they announce their love to their families, Shankar tells Vasanth about an act of treachery committed by one of his closest friends against his family.

The flashback is revealed. Shankar's family has one more member not mentioned thus far – another sister Shanthi. There are happy scenes where Shankar, his friends and his mother prepare for her wedding. Of his friends, there is a particularly close one – Shakthi, who much like Vasanth today was Shankar's best friend at the time. Tragedy strikes when Shankar and his mother find that his sister had fled from the wedding hall, and they try to find her, encountering several humiliations along the way – from the groom's family and the police. Finally, they see an auto rickshaw, where his sister emerges from, and to his shock, Shakthi is with her. It turns out Shanthi had run off to marry Shakthi, which leaves Shankar and his mother broken-hearted. In their hurt and rage, they disown Shanthi, and become much more guarded with their interactions with Shankar's friends, explaining Shankar's mother's initial reaction towards Vasanth.

Seeing parallels between that story and his own, a shaken Vasanth resolves not to let love come before his friendship. Priya, on the other hand, is unwilling to let go, and requests him on repeated occasions to accept her love, to no avail. Her family prepares to arrange for her wedding, and increasingly desperate, she consumes poison and is taken to the hospital. Vasanth's friend Boopalan, who believes enough is enough, tells Shankar and his family about Vasanth and Priya's love for each other, and how Vasanth, for the sake of his friendship with Shankar, had sacrificed his love. An emotional Shankar tells Vasanth that he is proud of their friendship, and gives his approval for Vasanth and Priya's marriage.

== Cast ==
- Prashanth as Vasanth
- Simran as Priya
- Karan as Shankar
- Vivek as Raju
- Vignesh as Shakthi (guest appearance)
- Rathan as Madhavan, Vasanth's father (guest appearance)
- Ramji as Ram
- Srividya as Lakshmi, Shankar, Shanthi and Priya's mother
- Chinni Jayanth as Boopalan
- Vaiyapuri as Jambu
- Thalapathi Dinesh as Inspector Ravikanth
- Indhu as Shanthi
- Dinesh (special appearance in "Kothavaal Saavadi Lady")
- Japan Kumar (special appearance in "Kothavaal Saavadi Lady")

== Soundtrack ==
Kannedhirey Thondrinal

Soundtrack album by Deva
- Released: 1998
- Genre: Feature film soundtrack
- Length: 35:35
- Language: Tamil
- Label: The Best Audio

Deva chronology
Ellame En Pondattithaan (1998)	Kannedhirey Thondrinal (1998)	Unnudan (1998)

The music was composed by Deva. The song "Salomiya" is inspired by "Saiyoni" by the Pakistani band Junoon.

Track listing
No.	Title	Lyrics	Singer(s)	Length
1.	"Chinna Chinna Kiliye"	Vairamuthu	Hariharan, Anuradha Sriram, Mahanadhi Shobana	5:14
2.	"Salomiya"	Deva	Deva	4:38
3.	"Eashwara Vanum Mannum"	Vairamuthu	Udit Narayan	5:07
4.	"Chanda o Chanda"	Vairamuthu	Harini	5:05
5.	"Kanave Kalaiyadhe"	Vairamuthu	P. Unni Krishnan, K. S. Chitra	5:10
6.	"Chinna Chinna Kiliye II"	Vairamuthu	Krishnaraj, Anuradha Sriram, Mahanadhi Shobana	5:12
7.	"Kothavaal Saavadi Lady"	Ponniyin Selvan	Sabesh	5:09
Total length:				35:35

== Reception ==
Ji of Kalki praised Ravichandran's direction, the acting of Prashanth and Simran, and Thangar Bachan's cinematography but panned Deva's music. D. S. Ramanujam of The Hindu wrote, "Debutant director Ravichandran has done a fairly impressive job, the momentum in the small nucleus of the plot being kept till the end by his screenplay and dialogue. Prasanth, after his recent success in Jeans and Karan have put up sterling performances". The film performed well at the Tamil Nadu box office.

After this film, Prashanth and Simran went on to act together in successful films like Jodi (1999), Parthen Rasithen (2000) and Thamizh (2002).

== Remakes ==
The film was remade in Telugu as Manasulo Maata (1998), in Kannada as Snehaloka (1999), in Malayalam as Dhosth (2001), in Bengali as Sangee (2003), in Bangladeshi as Tumi Kato Sundor (2008) and in Marathi as Friends (2016).
