= Vijay Jayapal =

Indian film director

- Born: Vijay Jayapal; Chennai
- Occupation: Filmmaker
- Years active: 2016–present

Vijay Jayapal is an Indian film director. His directorial debut Revelations (2016) a Tamil language Drama premiered at the 21st Busan International Film Festival.

Jayapal's second feature film Nirvana Inn (2019) was chosen to attend the 24th Busan International Film Festival after receiving the Asian Cinema Fund for post production. The film was also a part of the Asian Project Market in Busan.
