= Phases of Matter (film) =

2020 Turkish documentary

- Directed by: Deniz Tortum
- Produced by: Ana Maria Aslanoğlu; Öykü Canlı; Aslı Erdem
- Cinematography: Deniz Tortum
- Edited by: Sercan Sezgin
- Music by: Alican Çamcı
- Release date: 2020
- Running time: 71 minutes
- Country: Turkey

Phases of Matter (Turkish: Maddenin Halleri) is a 2020 documentary directed by Deniz Tortum about the Cerrahpaşa Hospital in Istanbul, Turkey. It premiered at the International Film Festival Rotterdam in 2020, and won the Best Documentary Award in Both Antalya Golden Orange Film Festival and Istanbul International Film Festival.

== Plot ==
Phases of Matter follows the day-to-day lives of various workers, such as surgeons, trainees, nurses, and imams at Istanbul's Cerrahpaşa Hospital.

== Awards and nominations ==
| Festival | Year | Category | Results |
|---|---|---|---|
| International Film Festival Rotterdam | 2020 | Bright Futures | Nomination |
| 57. Antalya Golden Orange Film Festival | 2020 | Best Documentary | Won |
| Istanbul International Film Festival | 2020 | Best Documentary | Won |
| Accessible Film Festival | 2020 | Best Film | Won |

== Reception ==
On the film aggregator Rotten Tomatoes, the film holds an approval rating of 100%.

Peter Keough of Boston Globe wrote "Had Frederick Wiseman’s ‘Hospital’ wandered into Lars von Trier's ‘The Kingdom’ the unlikely result might have resembled Deniz Tortum's haunting and hypnotic Phases of Matter," while in his critique on Reverse Shot, James Wham wrote "We feel the hospital’s heartbeat; we hear this organism breathe."
