= Arun Karthick =

Indian film director

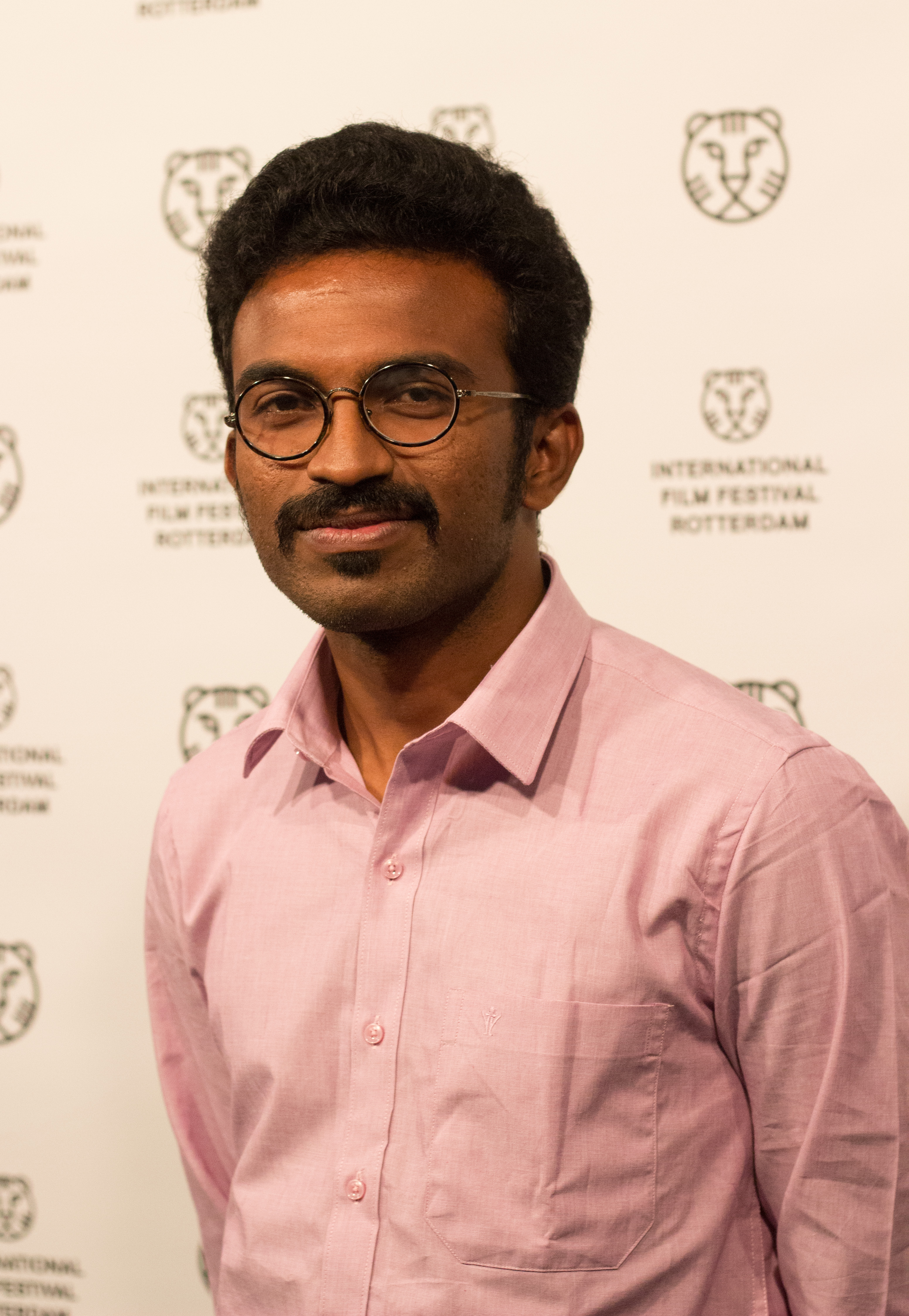
- Born: Arun Karthick; 1992 (age 32–33); Coimbatore
- Occupation: Filmmaker
- Years active: 2016–present

Arun Karthick (Tamil: அருண் கார்த்திக்; born 1992) is an Indian film director. His directorial debut Sivapuranam (2016) a Tamil language Film premiered at the International Film Festival Rotterdam. Karthick's second feature film Nasir (2020) received the Hubert Bals Fund enabling it to become a coproduction with the Netherlands. Nasir premiered at the International Film Festival Rotterdam in 2020, was an entry for the Tiger Competition and won the NETPAC Award for the best Asian feature film. The film's North American premiere will be at the New Directors/ New Films festival organized by the Museum of Modern Art and the Film Society of Lincoln Centre.
