= Maharshi (soundtrack) =

Soundtrack album by Devi Sri Prasad
- Released: 15 May 2019
- Recorded: 2018–2019
- Genre: Soundtrack
- Length: 31:38
- Language: Telugu
- Label: Aditya Music
- Producer: Devi Sri Prasad

Devi Sri Prasad chronology
| Chitralahari (2019) | Maharshi (2019) | Sarileru Neekevvaru (2019) |

Singles from Maharshi
- 1. "Choti Choti Baatein" Released: 29 March 2019; 2. "Nuvve Samastham" Released: 12 April 2019; 3. "Everest Anchuna" Released: 20 April 2019; 4. "Padara Padara" Released: 24 April 2019; 5. "Paala Pitta" Released: 29 April 2019; 6. "Idhe Kadha Nee Kadha" Released: 3 May 2019

Maharshi is the soundtrack album composed by Devi Sri Prasad for the 2019 Tollywood film of the same name starring Mahesh Babu, Pooja Hegde, and Allari Naresh in lead roles, directed by Vamshi Paidipally. The film marks Devi's second collaboration with Paidipally after Yevadu (2014). The album consists of eight songs with Sri Mani penning all the lyrics of the Telugu version. The soundtrack album was released digitally on 15 May 2019 on the Aditya Music label.

== Background and production ==
The film marks Devi's second collaboration with Paidipally after Yevadu (2014) and fourth collaboration with Mahesh Babu after 1: Nenokkadine (2014), Srimanthudu (2015) and Bharat Ane Nenu (2018). Music production of the film began in early 2019, in parallel to film's shooting. DSP's regular collaborator Sri Mani has written all the tracks for the Telugu version. In an interview with Cinema Express, lyricist Sri Mani said that "It's important to blend the ideas of the director and music composer with my words. It's imperative to be on the same page as them. I try to write lines that gel with the director's vision, stay true to the story, the situation of the song, the character, and the tune. However, the challenge is always to find something good, new, and interesting to write".

The first single "Choti Choti Baatein" is based on the friendship between three lead roles (played by Babu, Hegde and Naresh) during their college life. Second single "Nuvve Samastham" explores the success of the character Rishi (played by Babu). The song was shot at various locations in the New York City, including the Statue of Liberty. On singing "Everest Anchuna" song, Vishnupriya Ravi told The Hindu that "I prefer fast, peppy numbers because I feel it suits my voice". Fourth single "Padara Padara" is based on the importance of agriculture focusing on the new-age farming and the issues being faced by farmers in India. The Indian Express reporting the release of the song, cited that "Mahesh Babu plays the saviour of distressed farmers". The fifth single "Paala Pitta" is a folk track, with Manasi getting praise for her voice.

== Release ==
A total of eight tracks were featured in the soundtrack album. Initially the jukebox of the film is reported to be released on 25 April 2019, which was later released on 30 April 2019, a day before the film's pre-release event. The official soundtrack (jukebox) has six tracks, while the total soundtrack which was released on 1 May 2019 during the pre-release event, has eight tracks. Out of the eight tracks, five tracks in the soundtrack album were released as singles. The first single "Choti Choti Baatein", written by Sri Mani and sung by Devi Sri Prasad, was released on 29 March 2019 coinciding with Friendship Day. The Album's second single "Nuvve Samastham", written by Sri Mani and sung by Yazin Nizar, was released on 12 April 2019. The third single "Everest Anchuna", a peppy song sung by Vedala Hemachandra and Vishnupriya Ravi, was released on 20 April 2019. The fourth single "Padara Padara", sung by Shankar Mahadevan, was released on 24 April 2019. Fifth single "Paala Pitta", sung by Rahul Sipligunj and M. M. Manasi, was released on 29 April 2019. All these singles were first released in lyrical version and later in the full video version. Lyrical version of two tracks in the extended soundtrack were released on 4 and 15 May 2019 (after the release of the soundtrack album). Full video versions of all the tracks were released in June and July 2019, including the remaining one track. After the success of the soundtrack album, Devi Sri Prasad released a tribute video in June 2019, featuring the entire music production team.

=== Marketing ===
Various music artistes of the soundtrack album, have performed the eight songs at the film's pre-release event held at People's Plaza, Necklace Road, Hyderabad.

== Track listing ==
All lyrics are written by Sri Mani.

Maharshi (Original Motion Picture Soundtrack)
| No. | Title | Singer(s) | Length |
|---|---|---|---|
| 1. | "Padara Padara" | Shankar Mahadevan | 4:51 |
| 2. | "Choti Choti Baatein" (Backing vocals: Ranina Reddy, Surmukhi Raman, Anitha, Roshini) | Devi Sri Prasad | 4:25 |
| 3. | "Nuvve Samastham" (Backing vocals: Ranina Reddy, Surmukhi Raman) | Yazin Nizar | 4:28 |
| 4. | "Everest Anchuna" | Vedala Hemachandra, Vishnupriya Ravi | 3:16 |
| 5. | "Phir Shuru" | Benny Dayal | 4:12 |
| 6. | "Paala Pitta" | Rahul Sipligunj, M. M. Manasi | 3:20 |
| 7. | "Idhe Kadha Nee Kadha–The Soul of Rishi" | Vijay Prakash | 2:49 |
| 8. | "Nuvvani Idhi Needani" | Karthik | 4:21 |
| Total length: | | | 31:38 |

== Reception ==
=== Critics ===
Neeshita Nyayapati of The Times of India praised the score of the film and wrote that "the OST of Maharshi is good for a one-time listen with most of the numbers sounding situational; they might work better when seen on-screen. The two duet numbers are mediocre, but lend some pep to the otherwise sombre album. It is only Nuvvu Samastham that manages to stand out, thanks to Yazin's vocals."

On reviewing the "Padara Padara" song, Vyas of The Hans India praised Mahadevan's vocals, Devi's music and the lyrics written by Sri Mani.

== Accolades ==
| Award (Note: Awards, festivals and organizations are in alphabetical order.) | Date of ceremony (Note: Date is linked to the article about the awards held that year, wherever possible.) | Category | Recipient(s) | Result | Ref. |
|---|---|---|---|---|---|
| National Film Awards | 25 October 2021 | Best Choreography | Raju Sundaram – (for "Everest Anchuna") | Won | |
| South Indian International Movie Awards | 18 September 2021 | Best Music Director – Telugu | Devi Sri Prasad | Won | |
| South Indian International Movie Awards | 18 September 2021 | Best Lyricist – Telugu | Sri Mani – (for "Idhe Kadha Nee Katha") | Won | |
| South Indian International Movie Awards | 18 September 2021 | Best Male Playback Singer – Telugu | Shankar Mahadevan – (for "Padara Padara") | Nominated | |
| Santosham Film Awards | 14 November 2021 | Best Female Playback Singer | Vishnupriya Ravi for "Everest Anchuna" | Won | |

== Album credits ==
Credits adapted from Aditya Music

=== Producer(s) ===
Devi Sri Prasad

=== Songwriter(s) ===
- Devi Sri Prasad (composer, arranger)
- Sri Mani (lyrics)

=== Performer(s) ===
Devi Sri Prasad, Shankar Mahadevan, Yazin Nizar, Vedala Hemachandra, Vishnupriya Ravi, Benny Dayal, Rahul Sipligunj, M. M. Manasi, Vijay Prakash, Karthik

=== Musician(s) ===
- Guitars – Josh Mark Raj, Godfray Immanuval
- Keyboard – Vikas Badisa, Kalyan, K. P., Devi Sri Prasad, Chinna, Venkatesh, Ravi, Chaitu,
- Rhythm – Kalyan, Sundar
- Sarangi – Manonmani
- Accordion – Rajkumar
- Flute – Kiran Kumar
- Shehnai – Balesh
- Violin – Chennai Strings, Rithu Vysakh
- Viola – Rithu Vysakh
- Additional Rhythm – K. P.
- Backing vocals – Ranina Reddy, Surmukhi Raman, Anitha, Roshini

=== Personnel ===
- Orchestra In-Charge – Murugan
- Album Co-ordinator – B. Manikandan
- Chorus conducted by – J Chittey Prakash Rao

=== Sound Engineers ===
- Brindavan–The Garden Of Music, Chennai – A. Uday Kumar
- Assistant Sound Engineer – Kutty Uday
- Assistant Sound Engineer – Suresh

=== Production ===
- Recorded by – A. Uday Kumar, T. Uday Kumar & Suresh Kumar Taddi
- Mixed by – A. Uday kumar
- Mastered by – A. Uday Kumar @ Brindavanam garden of music chennai
- Assisted by – Pugalendhi
