= 20th Santosham Film Awards =

2021 Tollywood award ceremony

- Awarded for: Excellence in cinematic and music achievements
- Presented on: 14 November 2021
- Date: 14 November 2021
- Site: Hyderabad International Convention Center (HICC), Hyderabad, India
- Hosted by: Suma Kanakala; Sudigali Sudheer; Akul Balaji; Sathish; Mukku Avinash; Syed Sohel Ryan; Ariyana Glory
- Produced by: Kondeti Suresh
- Organised by: Santosham Magazine

Highlights
- Lifetime achievement: Murali Mohan; Bharathiraja

The 20th Santosham Film Awards, officially known as Santosham – Suman TV South Indian Film Awards 2021, was an awards ceremony held at Hyderabad, India on 14 November 2021. The ceremony recognized the best films and performances from the Tollywood and other Indian language films and music released in 2019 and 2020, along with special honors for lifetime contributions and a few special awards. The awards are annually presented by Santosham Magazine. The event replaced the 18th and 19th ceremonies of Santosham Film Awards. The 18th awards ceremony was scheduled to be held in September 2020, which was cancelled due to COVID-19 pandemic in India.

== Honorary Awards ==
- Lifetime Achievement Award – Bharathiraja, Murali Mohan
- Santosham Allu Ramalingaiah Smaraka Award (2019) – Murali Mohan
- Santosham Allu Ramalingaiah Smaraka Award (2020) – L. B. Sriram
- Santosham Akkineni Smaraka Award (2019) – Suman
- Santosham Akkineni Smaraka Award (2020) – Giri Babu
- Santosham Daggubati Ramanaidu Smaraka Award – Adiseshagiri Rao
- Santosham EVV Smaraka Award – Vijay Kanakamedala for Naandhi
- Santosham Dasari Smaraka Award – Bommarillu Bhaskar
- Santosham Ramu Smaraka Award – Malashri

== 2019 Main Awards ==
=== Film ===
Category	Recipient	Film
Best Film (Note: Priyanka Dutt took the award.)	Dil Raju, C. Ashwini Dutt and Prasad V. Potluri	Maharshi
Best Director	Harish Shankar	Gaddalakonda Ganesh
Best Actress	Tamannaah Bhatia	F2: Fun and Frustration
Best Female Director	Nandini Reddy	Oh! Baby
Best Supporting Actor	Allari Naresh	Maharshi
Best Character Actor	Rajendra Prasad	Oh! Baby
Best Female Comedian	Hema	Vinaya Vidheya Rama
Best Story Writer	Shiva Nirvana	Majili
Best Dialogue	Puri Jagannadh	ISmart Shankar
Best Screenplay	Kishore Tirumala	Chitralahari
Best Action / Best Fight Master	Real Satish	ISmart Shankar
Best Cinematographer	R. Rathnavelu	Sye Raa Narasimha Reddy
Best Debut Director	Vishwak Sen	Falaknuma Das
Best Debut Actress	Shivathmika Rajashekar	Dorasaani
Best Film – Tamil	T. G. Thyagarajan	Viswasam

=== Music ===
Category	Recipient	Film
Best Male Playback Singer	S. P. Balasubrahmanyam	"Elluvochi Godaramma" from Gaddalakonda Ganesh
Best Female Playback Singer	Vishnupriya Ravi	"Everest Anchuna" from Maharshi

== 2020 Main Awards ==
=== Film ===
Category	Recipient	Film
Best Actress (Note: Sushanth took the award.)	Pooja Hegde	Ala Vaikunthapurramuloo
Best Character Actor	Murali Sharma	Ala Vaikunthapurramuloo
Best Supporting Actor	Sushanth	Ala Vaikunthapurramuloo
Best Debut Villain	Sunil	Colour Photo
Best Art Director	A. S. Prakash	
Best Debut Director	Karuna Kumar	Palasa 1978
Best Debut Director	Narendra Nath	Miss India
Best Villain – Tamil	Mime Gopi	
Best Actor – Tamil	Ashok Selvan	Oh My Kadavule
Best Director – Tamil	Ashwath Marimuthu	Oh My Kadavule

=== Music ===
Category	Recipient	Film
Best Female Playback Singer	Madhu Priya	"He's So Cute" from Sarileru Neekevvaru
Best Music Director – Tamil	Leon James	Oh My Kadavule

== Special awards ==
- Most Promising Actress – Payal Rajput
- Special Jury Award – Aditi Bhavaraju for "Baavochhadu" from Palasa 1978

== Presenters ==
2019 main awards
Category	Presenter(s)
Best Director Award	Talasani Srinivas Yadav
Best Female Director	Talasani Srinivas Yadav
Best Film	Rajendra Prasad & Bharathiraja
Best Character Actor	Murali Mohan
Best Supporting Actor	Murali Mohan
Best Film – Tamil	Tanikella Bharani
Best Action/Best Fight Master	Bharathiraja
Best Story Writer	Chiranjeevi
Best Actress	Chiranjeevi
Best Debut Director	Chiranjeevi
Best Cinematographer	Chiranjeevi
Best Female Comedian	Chiranjeevi
Best Dialogue	Allu Aravind & Chiranjeevi
Best Screenplay	Allu Aravind & Chiranjeevi
Best Male Playback Singer	Allu Aravind & Chiranjeevi
Best Female Playback Singer	Allu Aravind & Chiranjeevi
Best Debut Actress	Malashri & Harsha

2020 main awards
Category	Presenter(s)
Best Villain – Tamil	Tanikella Bharani
Best Actor – Tamil	Tanikella Bharani
Best Director – Tamil	Tanikella Bharani
Best Debut Villain	Bharathiraja
Best Actress	Chiranjeevi
Best Character Actor	Chiranjeevi
Best Debut Director	Chiranjeevi
Best Supporting Actor	Chiranjeevi
Best Female Playback Singer	Chiranjeevi
Best Art Director	Malashri & Harsha
Best Debut Director	Malashri & Harsha

Other awards
Category	Presenter(s)
Santosham Akkineni Smaraka Award (2019)	Murali Mohan
Santosham Akkineni Smaraka Award	Murali Mohan
Santosham Daggubati Ramanaidu Smaraka Award	Murali Mohan
Santosham Dasari Smaraka Award	Chiranjeevi
Santosham EVV Smaraka Award	R. Narayana Murthy & Allari Naresh
Most Promising Actress	Allu Aravind & Chiranjeevi
Santosham Akkineni Smaraka Award (2020)	Allu Aravind & Chiranjeevi
Santosham Ramu Smaraka Award	Allu Aravind & Chiranjeevi
Santosham Allu Ramalingaiah Smaraka Award	Allu Aravind & Chiranjeevi
Santosham Lifetime Achievement Award (Murali Mohan)	Allu Aravind & Chiranjeevi
Santosham Lifetime Achievement Award (Bharathiraja)	Allu Aravind & Chiranjeevi
Special Jury Award	Malashri & Harsha

== Performers ==
- Monal Gajjar
- Divi Vaidya
- Akhil Sarthak
- Hamida
- Pragathi
- Indraja
- Mishra
- Hebah Patel
- Raai Laxmi
- Sandeep & Jyothi Raj
