= Maharishi (disambiguation) =

Maharishi is a Sanskrit word.

Maharishi may also refer to:

- Maharshi (1988 film), an Indian Telugu-language film
- Maharshi (2019 film), an Indian Telugu-language action drama film by Vamsi Paidipally
  - Maharshi (soundtrack), soundtrack album of the film by Devi Sri Prasad
- Maharishi (writer), Indian writer
