= Mugur Sundar =

Indian choreographer, film director and actor (born 1935)

- Born: Mugur Sundar; 31 October 1935 (age 90); Muguru, Mysore, Mysore State, India
- Other name: Sundaram
- Occupations: Choreographer, Film director, Actor
- Years active: 1962-2017
- Spouse: Mahadevamma
- Children: Raju Sundaram; Prabhu Deva; Nagendra Prasad

Mugur Sundar (born 31 October 1935) is a dance choreographer, film director and actor in South Indian cinema.

== Early life ==
Sundar was born in Muguru, a village located in Mysore district, Karnataka. He has three sons, Prabhu Deva, Raju Sundaram and Nagendra Prasad, who are established dance masters and have also worked in Kollywood films. All the three are distinct actors also and Prabhudeva is currently a successful Director as well.

== Career ==
He worked in Chandamama Press in Chennai for a salary of Rs.40 per month. He learnt dancing by paying Rs.10. In 1962 he got a chance to be a group dancer in the movie Konjum Salangai. He worked as assistant to Thangappan master for four years. He has worked in Tamil cinema in his over four decade long career. He joined the film industry in the late 1970s and is quite active since the early 1980s. He was a busy choreographer in the 1980s and has worked with almost all leading actors since the early 1980s. Aarada Gaaya released in 1980 is one of his earliest credited works. It was followed by Preethisi Nodu, Prachanda Putanigalu, Anupama, Nee Nanna Gellalare, Keralida Simha are some of his early works. He was active in the film industry till the mid-2000s. He choreographed for about 1000 movies, in a career spanning to about three decades.

In 2001, he directed his first Kannada film Manasella Neene, a remake of Telugu film Manasantha Nuvve. his son Nagendra Prasad played a lead role in the film.

He portrayed lead role in a Tamil film called Pa. Ra. Palanisamy (2010).

== Television ==
He was one of the judges in the famous Dance show AATA 4 which is telecast on Zee Telugu, a Telugu channel. Sundaram donned the role of a judge on Vijay TV's popular show Jodi No.1, Jodi No.1 Season Two where the participants are television artistes. His fellow judges were Silambarasan and Sangeetha.

== Filmography ==
| Year | Film | Role | Language | Notes |
|---|---|---|---|---|
| 1989 | Geethanjali | | Telugu | Uncredited role in the song "Jallanta Kavvinta" |
| 2007 | Shankar Dada Zindabad | Old man in old age home | Telugu | |
| 2009 | Thabbali | Himself | Kannada | guest appearance |
| 2010 | Pa. Ra. Palanisamy | Pa. Ra. Palanisamy | Tamil | |
| 2012 | Genius | Himself | Telugu | guest appearance in "Chirigina Notu" song |
| 2017 | Jani | Himself | Kannada | guest appearance |

== Awards ==
National Film Awards

- He Won the National Film Award for Best Choreography for his work In the movie Thiruda Thiruda in 1993.

Filmfare Awards South

- Filmfare Lifetime Achievement Award – South (1999)

Nandi Awards

- Best Choreographer - Geethanjali (1989)
- Best Choreographer - Jagadeka Veerudu Athiloka Sundari (1990)

Vijay Awards

- Vijay Award for Contribution to Tamil Cinema in 2010.
