= Y2K (2004 film) =

Indian Kannada-language romantic drama film

- VCD cover
- Directed by: N. Lokanath
- Written by: N. Lokanath
- Produced by: Manjunath Reddy; Bhoopal Reddy; Kolar Kumar
- Starring: Nagendra Prasad; Mithisha Sharma
- Cinematography: H C Venu
- Edited by: T Shashikumar
- Music by: Sadhu Kokila
- Production company: Kanipakkam Sri Vinayaka Productions
- Release date: 26 March 2004
- Country: India
- Language: Kannada

Y2K is a 2004 Indian Kannada-language romantic drama film directed by N. Lokanath and starring Nagendra Prasad and Mithisha Sharma.

== Plot ==
The film follows Yuvaraj who is possessive about Keerthi, which proves to be his weakness.

== Cast ==
- Nagendra Prasad as Yuvaraj
- Mithisha Sharma as Keerthi
- Sadhu Kokila
- Mimicry Dayanand as the principal
- Bharath Bhagavathar as the principal's son
- Chitra Shenoy as Keerthi's mother
- Jayalakshmi as Nimmi
- Shriraksha as a lecturer (uncredited)

== Production ==
The film is directed by N. Lokanath of H_{2}O (2002) fame. The muhurat took place at the end of 2002. Mithisha Sharma, who appeared in several advertisements such as Airtel, Close-Up and Surf Excel, made her debut through this film. The film initially started out with a budget of 70 to 80 lakhs rupees. The film was shot in St. Joseph's College, Bangalore. Four songs were the last to be filmed. The film exceeded its initial budget and the producer Kumar claimed that the film's budget may reach ₹1 crore. The film was expected to complete shooting by 20 May 2003.

== Soundtrack ==
The music was composed by Sadhu Kokila. The lyrics were written by V. Nagendra Prasad, Ramnarayan, N. Lokanath and Bhangiranga. The audio release function was held in Green House, Bangalore. Upendra and G. Tulasiram Naidu, the owner of Lahari Recording Company attended the function as chief guests.

Track listing
No.	Title	Lyrics	Singer(s)	Length
1.	"Y2K Sexy Lady"	Ramnarayan	Suresh Peters, Naga Chandrika	5:33
2.	"Ambola Jambola"	Bhangiranga	Hariharan	4:29
3.	"Bidenu Bidenu"	Ramnarayan	Rajesh Krishnan, Swarnalatha	6:23
4.	"Jagavu Harasuthide"	N. Lokanath	Sadhu Kokila, Badri Prasad, Vijay Urs, Usha	6:05
5.	"Udaaysu Neenu"	V. Nagendra Prasad	Shankar Mahadevan	5:48
6.	"Suryane Niyamava"	Ramnarayan	Udit Narayan, K. S. Chithra	3:41
Total length:				31:59

== Reception ==
S. N. Deepak of Deccan Herald felt the lead pair Prasad and Mithisha needed to hone their acting skills but praised Venu's cinematography and Sadhu Kokila's music.
