= Manasella Neene =

- Official poster
- Directed by: Mugur Sundar
- Written by: M. S. Raju
- Based on: Manasantha Nuvve (Telugu)
- Produced by: Mahadevamma Sundar
- Starring: Nagendra Prasad; Gayathri Raguram
- Cinematography: V. K. Kannan
- Edited by: Basavaraj Urs
- Music by: Ravi Raj
- Production company: Malai Madeshwara Cine Theaters
- Release date: 21 June 2002
- Running time: 156 minutes
- Country: India
- Language: Kannada

Manasella Neene (transl. You are all over my heart) is a 2002 Indian Kannada-language romance film directed by Mugur Sundar, a choreographer marking his debut in film direction. The film stars his youngest son Nagendra Prasad and Gayathri Raguram (in her Kannada debut) with Ananth Nag and Srinath in supporting roles. This film is the remake of the Telugu film Manasantha Nuvve (2001).

== Cast ==
- Nagendra Prasad as Venu (Chintu)
- Gayathri Raguram as Renuka
- Ananth Nag as the editor-in-chief of a magazine
- Srinath as Mohan Rao, Venu's father
- Ambika as Madhavi
- Chithra Shenoy as Venu's mother
- M. N. Lakshmi Devi
- Karibasavaiah as Sunil, Venu's friend
- Suja Raghuram as Shruthi
- Raju Sundaram as Arun
- Sundeep Malani as Venu's friend
- B Rakshet as Chintu/younger Venu
- Nayana as Anu/younger Renuka
- Prabhudeva in a special appearance

== Production ==
Choreographer Mugur Sundar ventured into direction with this film, which features his son Nagendra Prasad and Gayathri Raghuram in her Kannada debut. Prasad's brother, Prabhu Deva, chose the story from the Telugu film Manasantha Nuvve (2001). The film was launched on 10 December 2001. Dr. Rajkumar and Puneeth Rajkumar came to the film sets as guests. Raghuram's sister Suja and Raju Sundaram play supporting roles. The film was shot in Bengaluru and Sakleshpura and two of the songs ("Chakumaki Chitte" and "Preethiye Ninna") were shot in Malaysia, the former of which featured Raju Sundaram and was choreographed by Prabhu Deva.

== Soundtrack ==
The film's score and soundtrack was composed by Ravi Raj. Four songs were retained from the Telugu version by R. P. Patnaik, including "Jheer Jimbe Jheer Jimbe" which was re-arranged from Vidyasagar's original composition "Kannadi Koodum Kootti" from Pranayavarnangal (1998).

Track-list
No.	Title	Writer(s)	Singer(s)	Length
1.	"Phala Phala Holeyuva"	Nagathihalli Chandrashekar	K. S. Chithra
2.	"Jheer Jimbe Jheer Jimbe"	Belur Ramamurthy	Nanditha, Archana Udupa
3.	"Karaguthiro Ondu Kanasanthe"	M. L. Prasanna	Latha Hamsalekha
4.	"Preethiye Ninna"	V. Manohar	Swarnalatha, Rajesh Krishnan
5.	"Jheer Jimbe Jheer Jimbe"	Belur Ramamurthy	Rajesh Krishnan
6.	"Arathi Arathi"	Belur Ramamurthy	Rajesh Krishnan
7.	"Chakumaki Chitte"	Hamsalekha	Gurukiran, Anuradha Sriram
8.	"Elliruve Neenu"	V. Manohar	Hemanth, Archana Udupa
9.	"Prema Prema"	M. L. Prasanna	Ramesh Chandra
10.	"Karaguthiro Ondu Kanasanthe"	M. L. Prasanna	Ravi Raj
