= Main Aisa Kyun Hoon =

Single by Shankar–Ehsaan–Loy (composer) and Shaan (singer)

from the album Lakshya
- Released: 2004
- Genre: Feature film soundtrack, Hip hop
- Length: 4:34
- Label: Sony Music India
- Composer(s): Shankar–Ehsaan–Loy
- Lyricist(s): Javed Akhtar
- Producer(s): Farhan Akhtar and Ritesh Sidhwani

"Main Aisa Kyun Hoon" (transl. Why am I like this) is a single from the 2004 Indian film Lakshya composed by the trio Shankar–Ehsaan–Loy, featuring lyrics by Javed Akhtar, vocals by Shaan and choreographed by Prabhu Deva.

== Music ==
Farhan and the trio jammed together and decided to go on with a Funky-Techno hip-hop number. The song had a laid back groove, as it had to suit the character of Hrithik Roshan, the protagonist of the film, who's lazy and aimless.

== Reception ==
The song was lauded by critics and listeners alike. Rediff music review noted,"the superbly arranged hip-hop tune is one hell of a catchy number". The Bollywood Hungama in its year end music report, described the song as "an experiment succeeding big time".

Prabhu Deva, the choreographer of the song, said that "the song's beat was too good, and inspired him to do something different".

== Choreography ==
The song is noted for the choreography of Prabhudeva, which earned him his second National Film Award for Best Choreography after Minsaara Kanavu. The song features Roshan, who plays a typical capricorn, not a very active, out-there kind of person, and is shot in a surreal environment. The director of the film, Farhan Akhtar, was quoted saying "Main Aisa Kyon Hoon", the song with Prabhu Deva who also choreographed the dance sequences in the film, was supposed to be set in a very surreal environment. We wanted someone who could do some surrealistic moves. We also wanted to make it a challenge for Hrithik Roshan so he could have some fun.

== Awards ==
- National Film Award for Best Choreography – Prabhu Deva
- Filmfare Award for Best Choreography – Prabhu Deva

== See also ==
- Lakshya
- Shankar–Ehsaan–Loy
- Lakshya (soundtrack)
