= I Love You Da =

- DVD cover
- Directed by: C. Raajadurai
- Written by: C. Raajadurai, "Vaanavil" N. Raghu (dialogues)
- Produced by: Manoj Kumar
- Starring: Raju Sundaram; Simran
- Cinematography: A. Karthik Raja
- Edited by: P. Mohanraj
- Music by: Bharadwaj
- Production company: Guru Films
- Release date: 29 November 2002
- Running time: 145 minutes
- Country: India
- Language: Tamil

I Love You Da is a 2002 Indian Tamil-language Sports drama directed by C. Raajadurai, starring Raju Sundaram (in his debut as a lead actor in Tamil) and Simran, with Raghuvaran and Prakash Raj in supporting roles. The film, which had music composed by Bharadwaj, was released on 29 November 2002.

== Plot ==
Raju is a small time cricketer who makes it big. Priya is his neighbour in love with him. But Raju pretends that he does not care for her, as he knows that his brother Madhan has a crush on her. This creates some confusion but finally the lovers get united.

In between Raju is selected in the Indian team and makes it to the Cricklet World Cup. The finals are played between India and Pakistan. Priya's father is a bookie who tries to induce Raju into match fixing. But he does not fall into his trap and scores the required 20 runs to win the World Cup.

== Cast ==
- Raju Sundaram as Raju
- Simran as Priya
- Raghuvaran as Rajkishore
- Prakash Raj as Siddharth
- Senthil as Raju's Grandfather
- Janagaraj as Sadasivam
- Vennira Aadai Moorthy as Pattabi
- Alex as Inspector Pandiyan
- Ramesh Khanna as Madhan
- Indhu as Sudha
- Singamuthu as Police constable

== Production ==
The film marked the debut of choreographer Raju Sundaram as the protagonist in films, after he had appeared in item numbers as well as a supporting role in Shankar's Jeans. The director of the film was to be Raajadurai, who had been an erstwhile assistant of director Manoj Kumar during the making of Vaanavil. When the film began production in late 2001, a Telugu version titled I Love You Raa was also planned. Actress Simran, Raju Sundaram's girlfriend during the period, was signed to play the female lead role. The couple however split during the production of the film. Early reports suggested that noted South Indian cricketers including Sadagoppan Ramesh, Anil Kumble, Rahul Dravid and Javagal Srinath may feature as themselves in the film, but this proved to be untrue.

Despite the completion of the film's scenes by early 2002, production delays meant that the film faced a belated release at the end of the year.

== Soundtrack ==
The soundtrack was composed by Bharadwaj.

Song	Singers	Lyrics
"Adicha Sixaru" I	Tippu	Snehan
"Adicha Sixaru" II	Shankar Mahadevan	Snehan
"Autograph"	Yugendran, Pop Shalini	P. Vijay
"I Love You Daa"	Karthik, Pop Shalini	Vairamuthu
"MTV Paathuputta"	Mathangi	P. Vijay
"Oh Priya" I	Bharadwaj	Vairamuthu
"Oh Priya" II	Hariharan	Vairamuthu
"Ulagae Maayam"	Reshmi	Snehan
"Vandutaandaa"	Mano, Bharadwaj	Vairamuthu
"Yetho Yetho Ennil"	Josh Neelam, Srinivas	Snehan

== Reception ==
Malathi Rangarajan of The Hindu stated that the film "falls flat due to identifiable reasons — the director has not done his homework properly, the dialogue makes you squirm at times, none of the actors seems involved in the role taken up and to top it all the lead pair fails to make even a slight impression". Sify wrote "I Love You Da is like going to a barber for a trim, and ending up with a bald pate. The director attempts to articulate the craze for the game of cricket in India by focussing on a cricket star, but ends up by bowling a beamer to the audience!". Malini Mannath of Chennai Online wrote "One doesn't expect a first-time director to give a brilliant piece of work in his maiden film. But the least one can expect, is that he do the basic home-work on the theme he has chosen, sees that there is consistency in the characterisation, that the dialogue and incidents don't contradict the preceding ones. But the debutant director with an apprenticeship with director Manoj Kumar (this film's producer), hasn't bothered to make the slightest attempt in that direction. The script is shoddy with contradictions, inconsistencies, and slip-ups; the narration is slip shod, the whole scenario an insult to the viewer's intelligence". Cinesouth wrote "Tamil cine industry people have made up their minds that their audience is mentally still in Ice Age. If you don't agree with us, watch 'I Love You, Daa'. That's the proof. The first time director Rajadurai hasn't bothered about the tastes and likings of the audience and had made the scenes so ridiculously simple. For a maiden attempt, this is over recklessness on his part". Yahoo wrote "The much publicised erstwhile romantic pair Raju sundaram and Simran the offscreen lovers turned on screen lovers with this film. Like the real life romance fizzled out, this film too has no fizz".
