= Lakshya (2004 film) =

War drama film by Farhan Akhtar

- Theatrical release poster
- Directed by: Farhan Akhtar
- Written by: Javed Akhtar
- Produced by: Ritesh Sidhwani
- Starring: Amitabh Bachchan; Hrithik Roshan; Preity Zinta
- Cinematography: Christopher Popp
- Edited by: Anand Subaya
- Music by: Shankar–Ehsaan–Loy
- Production companies: Excel Entertainment; UTV Motion Pictures
- Distributed by: UTV Motion Pictures
- Release date: 18 June 2004
- Running time: 185 minutes
- Country: India
- Language: Hindi
- Budget: ₹30 crore (US$3.1 million)
- Box office: ₹41.68 crore (US$4.3 million)

Lakshya (transl. Aim) is a 2004 Indian Hindi-language coming-of-age war drama film directed by Farhan Akhtar, written by his father Javed Akhtar and produced by Ritesh Sidhwani under the banner of Excel Entertainment, with Ronnie Screwvala serving as co-producer under distributor UTV Motion Pictures. The film stars Amitabh Bachchan, Hrithik Roshan, and Preity Zinta in lead roles. Based on a story written by Javed in response to discussions with several 1999 Kargil War veterans and army officers, the film follows Karan Shergill, a lazy young man and the son of a wealthy businessman from Delhi, who joins the Indian Army and matures into a battlefield hero just as war breaks out.

At the 50th Filmfare Awards, Lakshya received 4 nominations, including Best Director (Farhan) and Best Actor (Roshan), and won 2 awards – Best Choreography (Prabhu Deva for "Main Aisa Kyun Hoon...") and Best Cinematography. Though the film was a box office failure, it gained a cult following later. The film was also instrumental in motivating youths across India to join the Indian Army.

== Plot ==
Karan Shergill is an irresponsible young man from Delhi who has no plans for his future. His girlfriend Romila Dutta, an aspiring journalist, tells him to have an aim in his life. Eventually, he contemplates joining the Indian Army at the urging of a friend. He takes the Combined Defence Services Examination, and to his surprise, gets selected for the Indian Military Academy (IMA), despite his parents' disapproval.

Karan's initial days at the IMA are a disaster, as his lack of discipline makes him unsuitable for a military life. Upset, he escapes from the academy and returns home. His parents are disappointed and tell him to join the family business. Romila angrily breaks up with him due to his lack of conviction. Devastated, Karan decides to get serious and returns to the IMA. He takes the punishment, becomes a focused cadet, excels in training, and finally graduates and is commissioned as a lieutenant.

Karan is posted to the 3rd battalion of the Punjab Regiment, commanded by Colonel Sunil Damle, stationed in Kargil, Ladakh. He returns home on leave and learns that Romila is getting engaged. The leave is cut short due to the outbreak of hostilities in Kargil, and he is promoted to acting Captain. Colonel Damle briefs the officers, revealing that infiltrators crossed the Line of Control (LoC) from Pakistan and occupied a series of mountain peaks on the Indian side. The battalion is assigned to secure Point 5179, a crucial vantage point dominating the army's main supply line, the National Highway 1D.

Since the other sides of the mountain are perilous to cross, the battalion decides to attack from the eastern side. The first part of the assault is successful in destroying the enemy's screening units, with Karan cited for his bravery. Meanwhile, Romila goes to Kargil as a war correspondent, where she meets a changed Karan and falls in love with him again. In the second phase, the battalion fails to capture the peak and suffers heavy casualties. Colonel Damle is given 48 hours, and he orders a group of twelve officers and soldiers (including Karan) to scale a 1000-foot rock cliff on the western side to flank the enemy. Karan finally finds his aim in capturing the peak and rekindles his relationship with Romila as well, after finding out she broke her engagement.

The unit sets off on its mission but loses its commanding officer and many soldiers to enemy fire. The remaining six men push forward and scale the cliff, attacking the Pakistani position during the night. Their assault is successful, although Karan is injured. The next morning, he spots the remaining Pakistani intruders and kills them. He then limps to the peak and plants the Indian flag, capturing it at last, while signalling Colonel Damle.

A few days later, Karan is discharged from a military hospital and reunites with his parents and Romila. In the midst of credits, Colonel Damle, Lieutenant Colonel Pradeep, and Subedar Major Pritam Singh pay their respects to all the martyrs of Operation Vijay.

== Cast ==
- Amitabh Bachchan as Colonel Sunil Damle (CO)
- Hrithik Roshan as Captain Karan Shergill, 3 Punjab
- Preity Zinta as Romila "Romi" Dutta (based on Barkha Dutt)
- Boman Irani as Sanjeev Shergill, Karan's father
- Anjula Bedi as Shalini Shergill, Karan's mother
- M. K. Raina as Akhilesh Dutta, Romi's father
- Lillete Dubey as Mrs. Dutta, Romi's mother
- Kushal Punjabi as Rajeev Goel, Romi's former fianceè
- Om Puri as Subedar Major Pritam Singh
- Sharad Kapoor as Major Binod Sengupta, OC A Company (3 Punjab)
- Raj Zutshi as Major Kaushal Verma, OC D Company (3 Punjab)
- Sushant Singh as Captain Jalal Akbar, OC E Company (3 Punjab)
- Prashant Chainani as Lieutenant Vishal Srivastav
- Shakeel Khan as Naik Raj Tilak Singh
- Vishal Vijay as Captain Saket Ahluwalia
- Ranvir Shorey as Sepoy Tarsem Singh
- Aarav Chowdhary as Captain Manjit Singh Dhingra, OC C Company (3 Punjab)
- Aditya Srivastava as Lt. Colonel Pradeep, SIC (3 Punjab)
- Abir Goswami as Captain Sudhir Mishra, RMO - Army Medical Corps
- Parmeet Sethi as Major Shahbaaz Hamdani, Pakistan Army
- Nawab Shah as Major Satish Babbar, OC B Company (3 Punjab)
- Abhimanyu Singh as Lt. Colonel Pratap Singh, Adjutant IMA (Kumaon Regiment)
- Ashok Kumar as Sepoy Babulal
- Vipul Gupta as Captain Rakesh Bhavnani
- Nissar Khan as Captain Bairam Khan, Pakistan Army
- Amit Behl as Major Subhash Pant, Company Commander IMA (Dogra Regiment)
- Bhanu Uday as Captain Abeer Saxena, Dogra Regt.
- Surendra Pal as Lt. General, IMA Commandant
- Amrish Puri as Brigadier Gautam Puri

== Production ==
The film's production took place across Mumbai and several locations in Uttarakhand. The scenes depicting Kargil were shot in Ladakh. Some parts of the film centered around Hrithik Roshan's military training were shot at the Indian Military Academy, Dehradun. Actual Indian Army officers also participated in the shooting of the film. Seeing both the actors and officers in the same getup, at times Preity Zinta would get confused separating the actual officers from the actors. Pankaj Tripathi, then a struggling actor, shot for the film at Ladakh with Roshan and the news went viral in Tripathi's village. However, Tripathi's role was cut during the editing, which he expressed disappointment on seeing.

== Soundtrack ==
Lakshya

Soundtrack album by Shankar–Ehsaan–Loy
- Released: 26 April 2004
- Recorded: Purple Haze Studios
- Genre: Feature film soundtrack
- Label: Sony Music India
- Producers: Farhan Akhtar; Ritesh Sidhwani

Shankar–Ehsaan–Loy chronology
Kyun! Ho Gaya Na... (2004)	Lakshya (2004)	Phir Milenge (2004)

Singles from Lakshya
- 1. "Main Aisa Kyun Hoon" Released: 2004

The film's soundtrack was composed by Shankar–Ehsaan–Loy, with lyrics written by Javed Akhtar. Shaan's "Main Aisa Kyun Hoon", picturized on Hrithik Roshan, was described as a laid-back, funky-hip hop track. The song "Agar Main Kahoon" was a love duet, picturized on Roshan and Preity Zinta. The trio used the harmonica for the track. The title track "Lakshya" was a techno-flavored patriotic song sung by Shankar Mahadevan, which is followed by "Kandhon Se Milte", another patriotic song with the vocals of Kunal Ganjawala and Vijay Prakash. "Kitni Baatein" was sung by Hariharan and Sadhana Sargam. There are two instrumentals, "Victory" and "Separation". The trumpet portion from "Victory" has been used as the background music for their logo by Excel Entertainment.

=== Track listing ===
All tracks are written by Javed Akhtar.

No.	Title	Singer(s)	Length
1.	"Main Aisa Kyun Hoon"	Shaan	4:34
2.	"Agar Main Kahoon"	Udit Narayan, Alka Yagnik	4:52
3.	"Kitni Baatein"	Hariharan, Sadhana Sargam	5:47
4.	"Lakshya"	Shankar Mahadevan	6:15
5.	"Kandhon Se Milte Hain Kandhe"	Kunal Ganjawala, Sonu Nigam, Roop Kumar Rathod, Kumar Sanu, Hariharan, Shankar Mahadevan	5:40
6.	"Separation"	Instrumental	2:29
7.	"Kitni Baatein" (Reprise)	Hariharan, Sadhana Sargam	4:19
8.	"Victory"	Chorus	3:20

=== Reception ===
Professional ratings
Review scores
Source	Rating
Bollywood Hungama	3/5 stars
PlanetBollywood.com	9/10 stars

The soundtrack received mixed-to-positive reviews from critics. Joginder Tuteja of Bollywood Hungama in his review, said "Lakshya does have good music that is very urban and will appeal to the class audience. Going by the theme of the movie, the album is pretty balanced and has been composed with style that speaks of class." PlanetBollywood.com found the album to be "as good as Dil Chahta Hai". Subhash K. Jha described the album as "daringly unusual sound with a show-offy kind of innovativeness". Sukanya Verma of Rediff.com, however, remarked that, though the album was good, it was below expectations and "lacked punch". According to the Indian trade website Box Office India, with around 11,00,000 units sold, this film's soundtrack album was the year's thirteenth highest-selling.

== Reception ==
=== Box office ===
Lakshya netted around Rs. 23 crore at the domestic box office. Lakshya grossed $5,859,242 worldwide including $753,600 from North American markets and $5,105,642 from other markets. In the U.S., it performed better, grossing $380,000 on 59 screens [approx. Rs. 1.75 crore] in its opening weekend with the per screen average being around $6,440.

=== Critical response ===
Lakshya was director Farhan Akhtar's second film, following the success of his first film, the cult classic Dil Chahta Hai (2001). However, despite much anticipation, it did not fare as well at the box-office. Nevertheless, after repeated re-runs on TV over the years, Lakshya has been regarded as a cult film among an audience that argues it is Hrithik Roshan's best performance to date. Lakshya was also instrumental in motivating youth across India to join the Indian Army.

== Accolades ==
Award	Category	Recipient	Result
52nd National Film Awards	Best Choreography	Prabhu Deva for "Main Aisa Kyun Hoon"	Won
50th Filmfare Awards	Best Choreography	Prabhu Deva for "Main Aisa Kyun Hoon"	Won
50th Filmfare Awards	Best Cinematography	Christopher Popp	Won
50th Filmfare Awards	Best Director	Farhan Akhtar	Nominated
50th Filmfare Awards	Best Actor	Hrithik Roshan	Nominated

== See also ==
- An Officer and a Gentleman
