= Everest Anchuna =

2019 song by Devi Sri Prasad, Hemachandra and Vishnupriya Ravi

- Song cover featuring Mahesh Babu and Pooja Hegde

Single by Hemachandra, Vishnupriya Ravi

from the album Maharshi
- Language: Telugu
- Released: 20 April 2019
- Recorded: 2019
- Studio: DSP Studio, Chennai; Brindavan-The Garden Of Music, Chennai; New Edge Studios, Mumbai
- Genre: Dance, pop, jazz, Electronic dance music
- Length: 3:16
- Label: Aditya Music
- Composer: Devi Sri Prasad
- Lyricist: Sri Mani
- Producer: Devi Sri Prasad

Maharshi track listing
- 1. "Padara Padara"; 2. "Choti Choti Baatein"; 3. "Nuvve Samastham"; 4. "Everest Anchuna"; 5. "Phir Shuru"; 6. "Paala Pitta"; 7. "Idhe Kadha Nee Kadha–The Soul of Rishi"; 8. "Nuvvani Idhi Needani"

Music video
- "Everest Anchuna" on YouTube

"Everest Anchuna" is an Indian Telugu-language song composed by Devi Sri Prasad, with lyrics by Sri Mani and recorded by Hemachandra, Vishnupriya Ravi for the soundtrack album of the 2019 film Maharshi. It was released on 20 April 2019 (released on YouTube as a lyrical video song) as the third single from the album, through Aditya Music. The full video song, featuring scenes directly from the film, was released on 1 July 2019 on YouTube.

The song was also released in Tamil and was included in the dubbed version of the film. The song received positive response upon its release. The track also topped the national charts, in all music and video platforms. Raju Sundaram won National Film Award for Best Choreography and Vishnupriya Ravi won Santosham Film Awards for Best Female Playback Singer.

== Production ==
The song was composed by Devi Sri Prasad in early 2019. Lyricist Sri Mani worked on lyrics of the song. The song was recorded by Hemachandra and Vishnupriya Ravi. In an interview with The Hindu, Vishnupriya said "DSP Devi Sri Prasad sir once called me for a recording and I had no idea at that time that it was for a Mahesh Babu film".

Vishnupriya said that she was excited to sing the song in Babu's 25th film as lead actor. About the song Vishnupriya said "I enjoy fast-paced, peppy numbers. That's my kind of genre. But it's important for every song to have a melody, otherwise it just doesn't work".

Vamshi Paidipally said that the song is placed when Mahesh Babu's character Rishi is a carefree college student. According to Vamshi, Babu and Pooja Hegde's dance steps and KU Mohanan's cinematography make "Everest Anchuna" the perfect dance number.

== Music video ==
=== Background and production ===
The music video was choreographed by Raju Sundaram. The video song was shot in early-April 2019 in a lavish set at Hyderabad. Vamshi revealed that the duet song will appear in the first half of the film, when Babu's character Rishi is a carefree college student. "Whether it is the sets full of neon lights, the playful light melody or the merry vibe, they all add up to encapsulate that particular phase of Rishi's life", he added.

=== Synopsis ===
The music video is a direct clip from the scenes in Maharshi. The video feature Mahesh Babu and Pooja Hegde dancing for the single.

== Marketing and release ==
On 17 April 2019, the makers of the film announced that the third single would release in two days. The video song teaser was also released on the same day. The second single titled "Everest Anchuna" was released on 20 April 2019 (released on YouTube as a lyrical video song) as the third single from the album, through Aditya Music.

After the release of video teaser, Vamshi said "After we heard the song, we knew we wanted something on-screen that would suit it. Whatever mood the song promo evokes is a result of months of planning and pre-production. But what the promo shows is only a small portion of what's in store. You need to see the song play on-screen, it will truly blow your mind." The full video song was released on 1 July 2019.

== Reception ==
Reviewing the song, Neeshita Nyayapati of The Times of India wrote "Hemachandra and Vishnupriya Ravi's Everest Anchuna is the token duet number between the protagonists. This number is yet another crowd favourite with Vishnupriya's vocals truly standing out amidst the subpar lyrics and music that keeps switching tracks."

In his review, Ramesh S Kannan of MovieCrow wrote "Everest Anchuna is another song where DSP hits high on techno sounds and Vishnupriya Ravi's husky vocals work effectually but Hemachandra's vocals sound more like DSP's vocals himself. However, the tune takes its own time to establish."

A critic of Indiaglitz wrote "Shree Mani's lyrics concoct imaginative ideas. The lyrics are not as ordinary and lifeless as the non-exhilarating music suggests. Hemanchandra is outcompeted by Vishnupriya Ravi's splendid rendition. The voices of the singers are enticing; they invite you to the lyrical world of roses and sexy curves."

== Impact ==
Upon the release, the song received positive response and eventually became a chartbuster. The song went on to become #1 on YouTube. Mahesh Babu and Pooja Hegde's rolling step in the music video went viral and became a signature hook step and was recreated by many, in many short-video and social media platforms.

Vishnupriya Ravi, the singer of the track revealed that she started getting several singing offers after the song's success. Raju Sundaram won his second National Film Award for Best Choreography for creating completely new and eye-pleasing dance steps while taking the story forward.

== Live performances ==
Hemachandra and Vishnupriya Ravi performed the song at the film's pre-release event held at People's Plaza, Necklace Road, Hyderabad. Vishnupriya said "I got a chance to perform in front of a huge crowd, and the who's who of the Telugu film industry were there. I could not meet the hero (Mahesh Babu), but he was sitting right there in the front row when I performed."

== Charts ==
Chart performances for "Everest Anchuna"
Chart (2019)	Peak position
India (Radio Mirchi Top 20)	9
India (Radio Mirchi Top 100)	31

== Credits and personnel ==
Credits adapted from YouTube.

- Devi Sri Prasad – composer
- Sri Mani – lyricist
- Hemachandra – vocal
- Vishnupriya Ravi – vocal
- Raju Sundaram – choreographer
- Vikas Badisa – keyboards
- Kalyan – rhythm
- Kiran Kumar – flute
- A. Uday Kumar – mix engineer, mastering engineer, programmer

== Accolades ==
Award (Note: Awards, festivals and organizations are in alphabetical order.)	Date of ceremony (Note: Date is linked to the article about the awards held that year, wherever possible.)	Category	Recipient(s)	Result
National Film Awards	25 October 2021	Best Choreography	Raju Sundaram	Won
Santosham Film Awards	14 November 2021	Best Female Playback Singer	Vishnupriya Ravi	Won
