= Nagendra Prasad =

Indian choreographer (born 1975)

- Born: Nagendra Prasad; 3 December 1975 (age 50); Mysore, Mysore State (now Karnataka), India
- Occupations: Actor; Choreographer; Film director
- Years active: 1991-present
- Spouse: Hemalatha
- Children: 2
- Father: Mugur Sundar
- Relatives: Raju Sundaram (brother); Prabhu Deva (brother)

Nagendra Prasad (born 19 December 1975) is an Indian dance choreographer, actor and director who works in Tamil and Kannada films. He is the youngest son of dance master Mugur Sundar, and younger brother to popular cine artistes Prabhu Deva and Raju Sundaram.

== Career and personal life ==
He was most noted for his appearance in the song "Humma Humma", from the film Bombay. He made his lead debut with the Kannada movie Chitra, opposite Rekha Vedavyas and subsequently acted in the movie Manasella Neene, which was directed by his father – choreographer Mugur Sundaram. He starred in several Tamil films as the hero's friend such as Kushi (2000), Ghilli (2004) and Master (2021). He has also acted in a tele-serial called "Maya Machindra" on STAR Vijay. He took part in Jodi number 1 season 7. He was eliminated in the semi-finals. He has a dance school, MSM dance school named after his father.

Similar to his brother Prabhu Deva, he aspired to be a director and worked as an assistant director for the Hindi film Rowdy Rathore (2012). He made his directorial debut with the film Lucky Man (2022).

His mother tongue is Kannada. He is married to Hemalatha.

== Filmography ==
=== Choreographer ===
- All films are in Tamil, unless otherwise noted.

Year	Film	Notes
1998	Jeans	
1999	Ninaivirukkum Varai	
2001	Chocklet	
2001	Minnale	
2002	Mutham	
2003	Parasuram	
2004	Y2K	Kannada films
2010	Bisile	Kannada films
2013	Udhayam NH4	
2017	Paambhu Sattai	
2021	Laabam	
2021	Thalaivii	Simultaneously shot in Hindi
2023	Kuttram Nadanthathu Enna?	

=== Actor ===
Year	Film	Role	Language	Notes
1995	Thotta Chinungi	Prasad	Tamil	
2000	Kushi	Babu	Tamil	
2001	Chitra	Ramu	Kannada	Lead debut credited as Prasad
2001	Chocklet	Guru	Tamil	
2002	123	Chidambaram	Tamil	
2002	Manasella Neene	Venu / Chintu	Kannada	
2002	Mutham	Anand	Tamil	
2003	Love Passagali	Prasad	Kannada	
2004	Y2K	Yuvaraj	Kannada	
2004	Ghilli	Velu's sidekick	Tamil	
2004	Srusti	Sandesh	Kannada	
2017	Bogan	Prasad	Tamil	
2018	Koothan	Krishna	Tamil	
2021	Master	JD's friend	Tamil	
2022	Battery	Arjun	Tamil	

=== Director ===
List of film directing credits
Year	Title	Language	Notes
2022	Lucky Man	Kannada	

=== Dancer ===
Year	Film	Song	Notes
1995	Bombay	"Humma Humma"	
1995	Coolie	"Hey Rammu Rammu"	
2000	Rhythm	"Thaniye"	
2001	Minnale	"Azhagiya Theeye"	
2001	Majunu	"Hari Gori"	
2003	Ramachandra	"Paarappa"	
2003	Kadhal Kirukkan	"Poththu"	
2004	Vajram	"Varnamayil Peeli Pole"	Malayalam film
2017	Paambhu Sattai	"Ichukkattaa"	
2018	Gulaebaghavali	"Guleba"	
2020	Pattas	"Morattu Thamizhan Da"	
2021	Laabam	"Yaamili Yaamiliyaa"	

=== Television ===
Year	Film	Role	Channel	Language	Notes
	Maya Machindra		Star Vijay	Tamil	
2014	Jodi No.1	Contestant	Star Vijay	Tamil	
2019	Thiravam		Zee5	Tamil	
2022	Five Six Seven Eight	Prasath	Zee5	Tamil	
2023	Weekend with Ramesh	Guest	Zee Kannada	Kannada	on episode with Prabhu Deva
