= National Film Award for Best Choreography =

Indian annual award

- National award for contributions to Indian Cinema
- Awarded for: Best choreography for a feature film song for a year
- Sponsored by: National Film Development Corporation of India
- Rewards: Rajat Kamal (Silver Lotus); ₹2,00,000
- First award: 1991
- Most recent winner: Vijay Ganguly, Stree 2 (2024)

The National Film Award for Best Choreography is one of the National Film Awards presented annually by the National Film Development Corporation of India. It is one of several awards presented for feature films and awarded with Rajat Kamal (Silver Lotus).

The award was instituted in 1991 at 39th National Film Awards but awarded first time at 40th National Film Awards and then awarded annually for films produced in the year across the country, in all Indian languages. Hindi (20 awards), Tamil (6 awards), Telugu (5 awards), Malayalam (4 awards), Bengali and Marathi (1 each).

The choreographer who has won most Rajat Kamal (Silver Lotus) for Best Choreography is Saroj Khan with 3 wins followed by Prabhu Deva, Raju Sundaram, Ganesh Acharya, and Vaibhavi Merchant with two wins each.

Sundaram and Prabhu Deva, Raju Sundaram are the father and son trio who are honored by this award.

== Winners ==
Award includes 'Rajat Kamal' (Silver Lotus) and cash prize. Following are the award winners over the years:

List of award recipients, showing the year (award ceremony), song(s), film(s) and language(s)
| Year | Recipient(s) | Song(s) | Film(s) | Language(s) | Refs. |
|---|---|---|---|---|---|
| 1991 (39th) | No Award | | | | |
| 1992 (40th) | Laxmibai Kolhapurkar | – | Ek Hota Vidushak | Marathi | |
| 1993 (41st) | Sundaram | – | Thiruda Thiruda | Tamil | |
| 1994 (42nd) | Jay Borade | – | Hum Aapke Hain Koun..! | Hindi | |
| 1995 (43rd) | Ileana Citaristi | – | Yugant | Bengali | |
| 1996 (44th) | Prabhu Deva | • "Strawberry Kannae" • "Vennilavae Vennilavae" | Minsara Kanavu | Tamil | |
| 1997 (45th) | Shiamak Davar | • "Le Gayi" • ”Koi Ladki Hai" • ”The Dance of Envy" | Dil To Pagal Hai | Hindi | |
| 1998 (46th) | Brinda | "Swargam Thedi Vannore" | Daya | Malayalam | |
| 1999 (47th) | Arsh Tanna | "Dholi Taro" | Hum Dil De Chuke Sanam | Hindi | |
| 1999 (47th) | Sameer Tanna | "Dholi Taro" | Hum Dil De Chuke Sanam | Hindi | |
| 1999 (47th) | Vaibhavi Merchant | "Dholi Taro" | Hum Dil De Chuke Sanam | Hindi | |
| 2000 (48th) | Kala | – | Kochu Kochu Santhoshangal | Malayalam | |
| 2001 (49th) | Raju Khan | "Ghanan Ghanan" | Lagaan | Hindi | |
| 2002 (50th) | Saroj Khan | "Dola Re Dola" | Devdas | Hindi | |
| 2003 (51st) | Farah Khan | "Idhar Chala Main Udhar Chala" | Koi... Mil Gaya | Hindi | |
| 2004 (52nd) | Prabhu Deva | "Main Aisa Kyu Hoon" | Lakshya | Hindi | |
| 2005 (53rd) | Saroj Khan | – | Sringaram | Tamil | |
| 2006 (54th) | Madhu Samudra | – | Rathri Mazha | Malayalam | |
| 2006 (54th) | Sajeev Samudra | – | Rathri Mazha | Malayalam | |
| 2007 (55th) | Saroj Khan | "Yeh Ishq Haaye" | Jab We Met | Hindi | |
| 2008 (56th) | Chinni Prakash | "Azeem-o-Shaan Shahenshah" | Jodhaa Akbar | Hindi | |
| 2008 (56th) | Rekha Prakash | "Azeem-o-Shaan Shahenshah" | Jodhaa Akbar | Hindi | |
| 2009 (57th) | K. Sivasankar | "Dheera Dheera Dheera" | Magadheera | Telugu | |
| 2010 (58th) | Dinesh | "Otha Sollaala" | Aadukalam | Tamil | |
| 2011 (59th) | Bosco-Caesar | "Senorita" | Zindagi Na Milegi Dobara | Hindi | |
| 2012 (60th) | Birju Maharaj | "Unnai Kaanadhu Naan" | Vishwaroopam | Tamil | |
| 2013 (61st) | Ganesh Acharya | "Maston Ka Jhund" | Bhaag Milkha Bhaag | Hindi | |
| 2014 (62nd) | Sudesh Adhana | "Bismil" | Haider | Hindi | |
| 2015 (63rd) | Remo D'Souza | "Deewani Mastani" | Bajirao Mastani | Hindi | |
| 2016 (64th) | Raju Sundaram | "Pranaamam" | Janatha Garage | Telugu | |
| 2017 (65th) | Ganesh Acharya | "Gori Tu Latth Maar" | Toilet: Ek Prem Katha | Hindi | |
| 2018 (66th) | Jyothi D. Tomar | "Ghoomar" | Padmaavat | Hindi | |
| 2018 (66th) | Kruti Mahesh | "Ghoomar" | Padmaavat | Hindi | |
| 2019 (67th) | Raju Sundaram | "Everest Anchuna" | Maharshi | Telugu | |
| 2020 (68th) | Sandhya Raju | "Kadambari" | Natyam | Telugu | |
| 2021 (69th) | Prem Rakshith | "Naatu Naatu" | RRR | Telugu | |
| 2022 (70th) | Sathish Krishnan (Note: Jani Master was initially announced as the co-winner, but his win was retracted due to sexual harassment allegations made against him.) | "Megam Karukkatha" | Thiruchitrambalam | Tamil | |
| 2023 (71st) | Vaibhavi Merchant | "Dhindhora Baje Re" | Rocky Aur Rani Kii Prem Kahaani | Hindi | |
| 2024 (72nd) | Vijay Ganguly | "Aaj Ki Raat" | Stree 2 | Hindi | |
