= Muguru =

Muguru Mooguru
- village
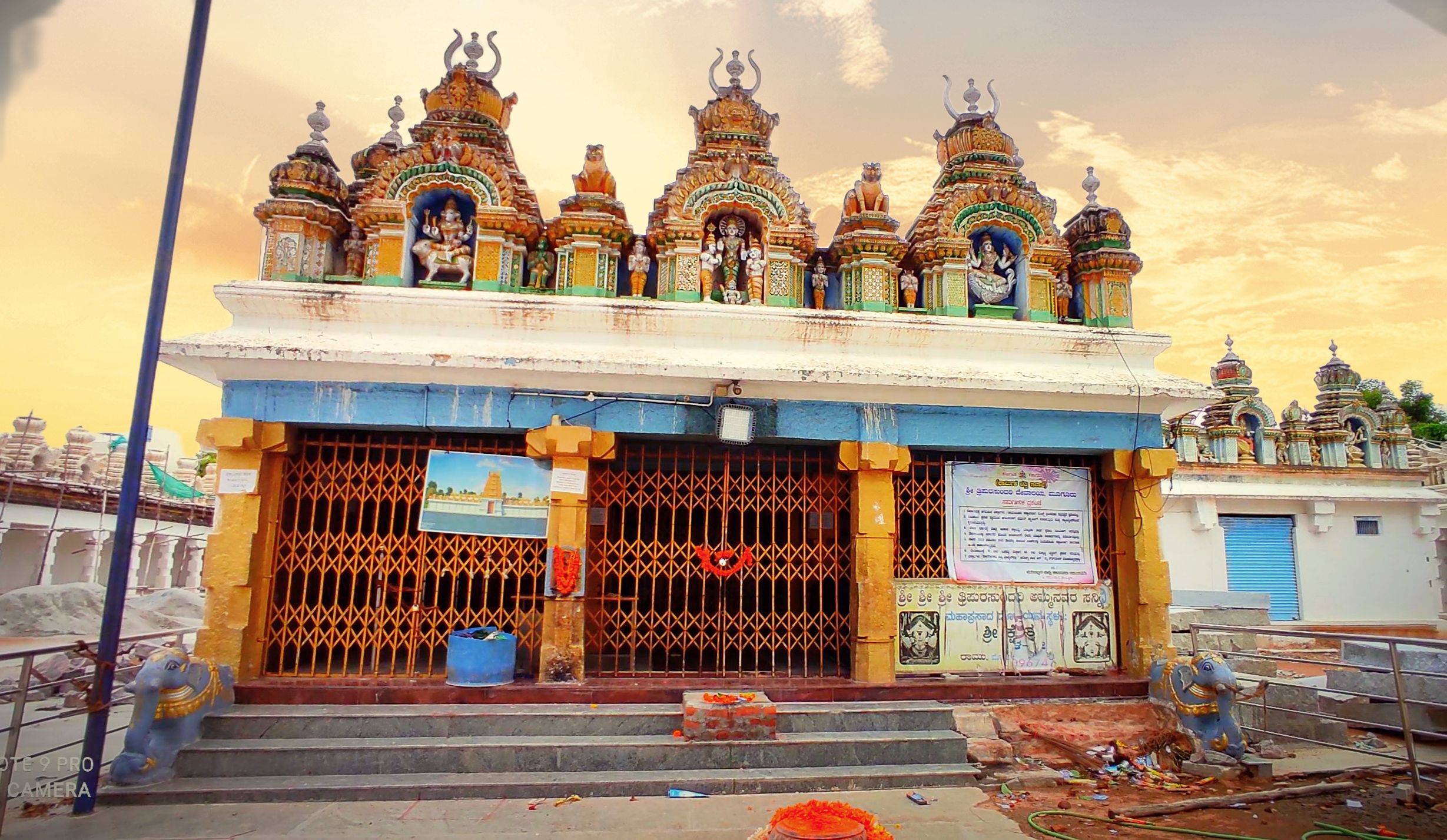
- Thibbadevi temple in Muguru

- Location in Karnataka, India Muguru (India)
- Coordinates: 12°08′N 76°57′E
- Country: India
- State: Karnataka
- District: Mysore
- Talukas: Tirumakudal Narsipur

Government
  - Body: Gram panchayat

Population (2011)
  - Total: 8,393

Languages
  - Official: Kannada
- Time zone: UTC+5:30 (IST)
- ISO 3166 code: IN-KA
- Vehicle registration: KA
- Website: karnataka.gov.in

Muguru or Mooguru is a village in the southern state of Karnataka, India. It is in the Tirumakudal Narsipur taluk of Mysore district in Karnataka.

In the 2001 India census Muguru had a population of 7727 with 3949 males and 3778 females.

== Gallery ==
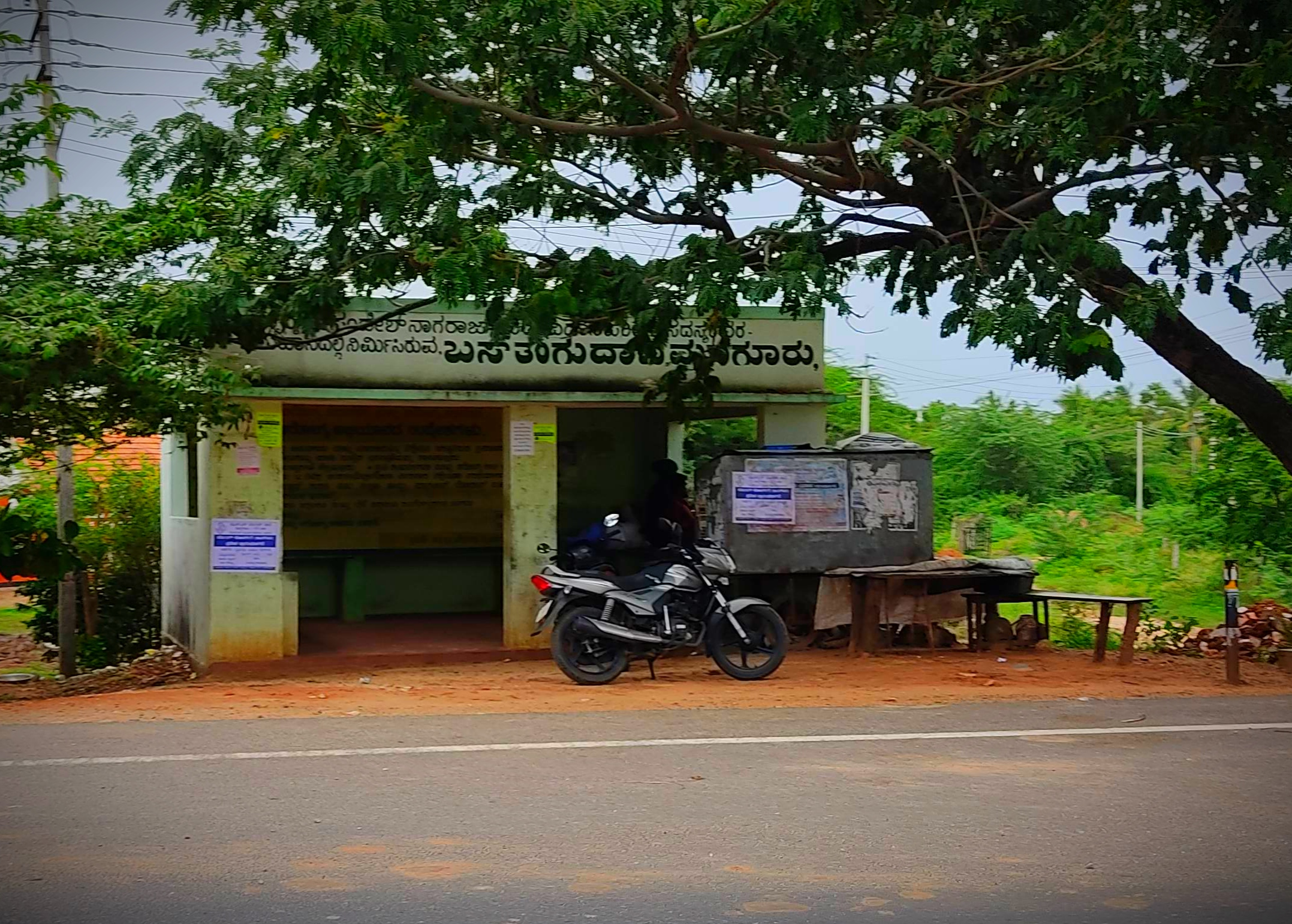
Bus stand at Muguru

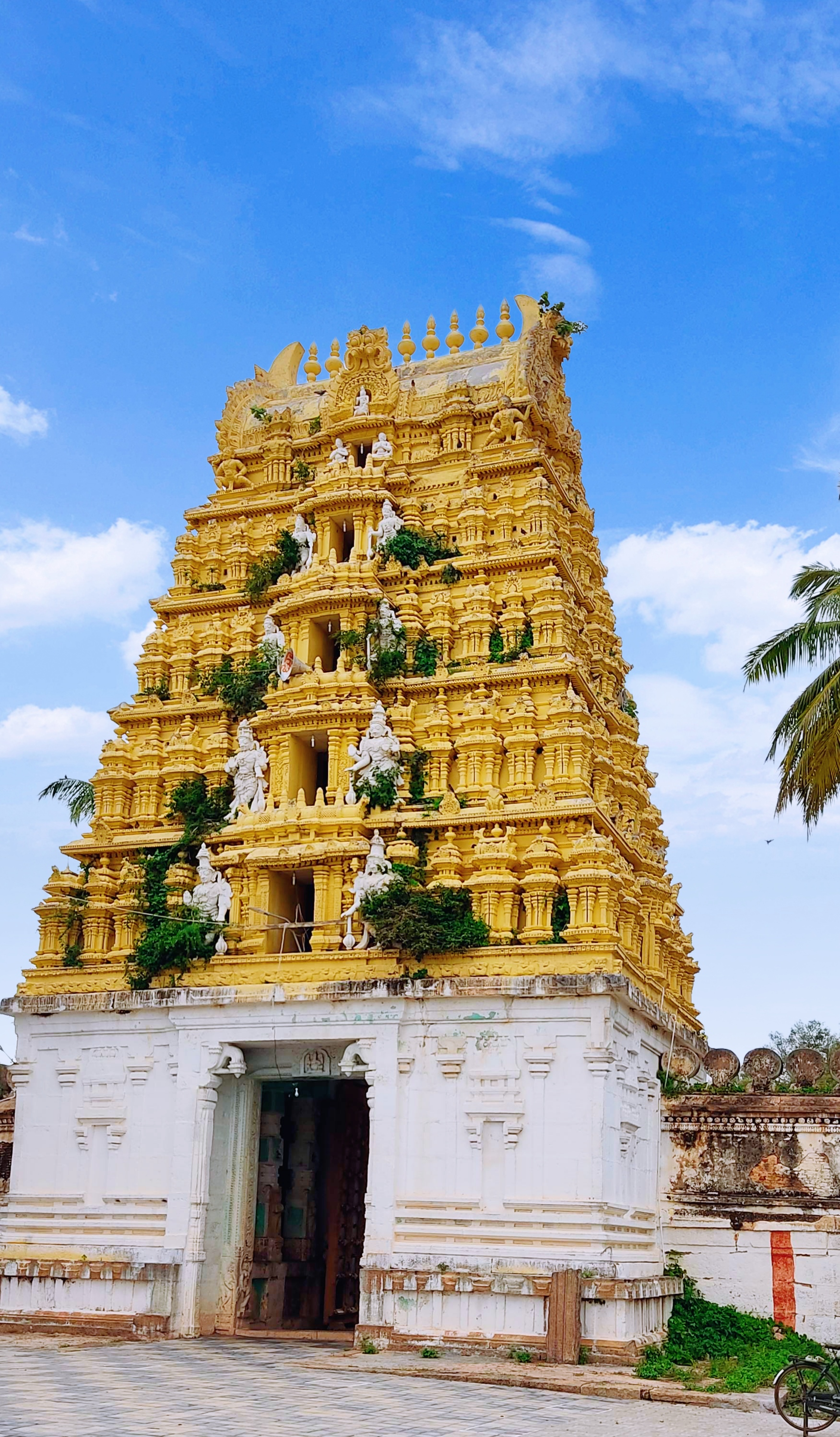
Desheshwara swamy temple in Muguru

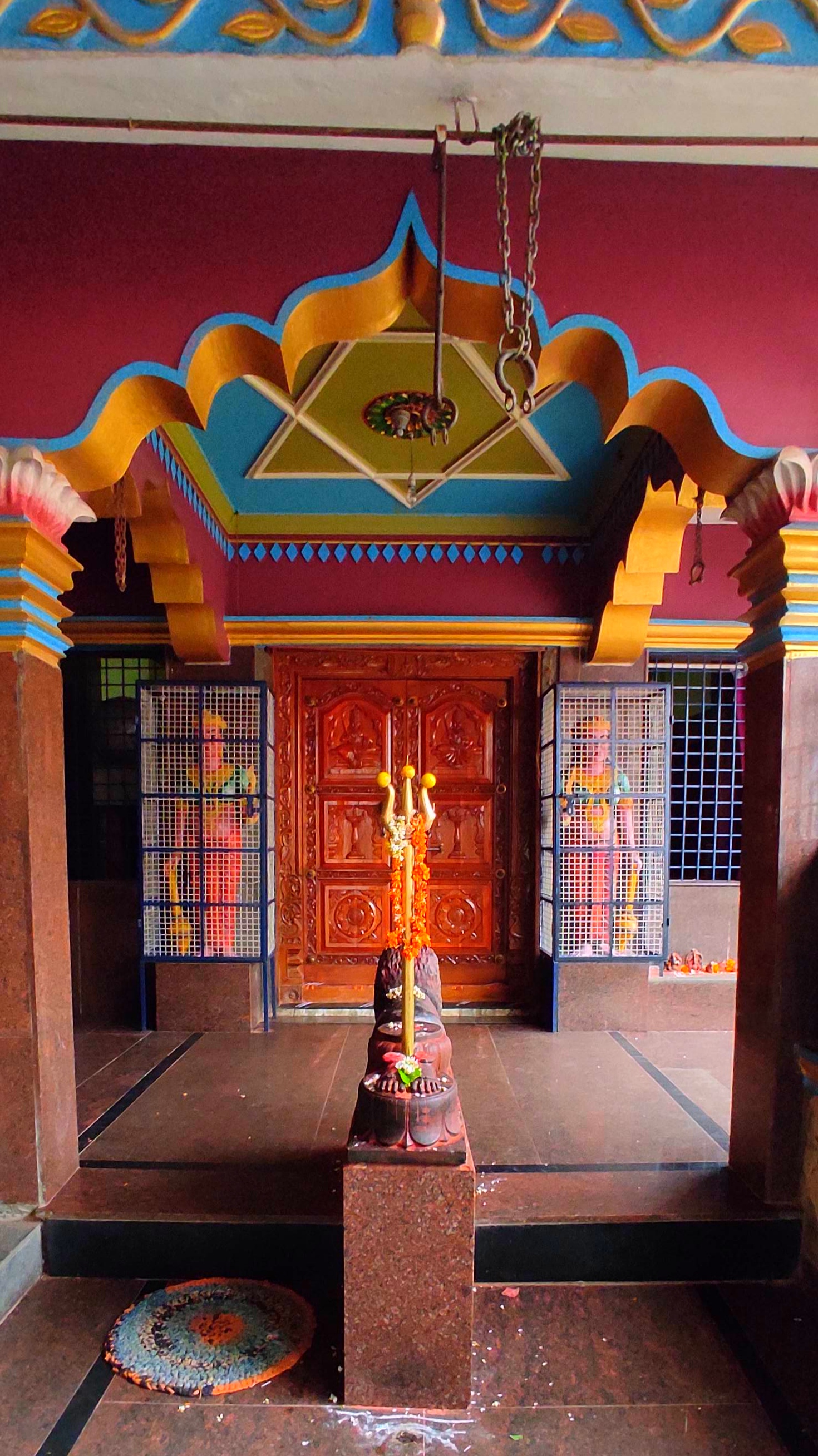
Rakasamma temple in Muguru

== See also ==
- Mysore
- Districts of Karnataka
