= Chitralahari (film) =

2019 film directed by Kishore Tirumala

- Theatrical release poster
- Directed by: Kishore Tirumala
- Written by: Kishore Tirumala
- Produced by: Naveen Yerneni; Yalamanchili Ravi Shankar; Mohan Cherukuri (CVM)
- Starring: Sai Dharam Tej; Kalyani Priyadarshan; Nivetha Pethuraj
- Cinematography: Karthik Gattamneni
- Edited by: A. Sreekar Prasad
- Music by: Devi Sri Prasad
- Production company: Mythri Movie Makers
- Release date: 12 April 2019
- Running time: 130 Minutes
- Country: India
- Language: Telugu
- Box office: ₹25–27 crore

Chitralahari is a 2019 Indian Telugu-language comedy drama film written and directed by Kishore Tirumala and produced by Mythri Movie Makers. The film stars Sai Dharam Tej, Kalyani Priyadarshan, and Nivetha Pethuraj, while Sunil, Vennela Kishore, Posani Krishna Murali, and Brahmaji, among others, play supporting roles. The music was composed by Devi Sri Prasad with cinematography by Karthik Ghattamaneni and editing by A. Sreekar Prasad. The film released on 12 April 2019 to mixed to positive reception and become a commercial success.

== Plot ==
Vijay Krishna is an engineering graduate who is called a loser because of his bad luck and lack of social skills. He is often misunderstood and rejected by everybody except for his father, Narayana, who supports him in every situation.

He is, however, an intelligent graduate who has an idea for an app to help people in road accidents and is looking for investors. He is in a relationship with Lahari, but he lies to her that he does not drink.

Whenever he goes to the bar, he often drinks with his friend Mike, who is a writer. They call themselves "Glassmates." He also never mentions that he works at a TV repair shop part-time and only mentions that he is working on a project. Vijay pitches the idea for his app to Janardhan, an executive in a company, who insults him and calls him unfit to complete his project because people do not care about rules. Vijay challenges Janardhan in front of his staff, arrogantly and confidently.

Lahari finds out the truth with the help of her misandrist friend Swecha and also listens to Vijay's pitch and breaks up with Vijay. Swecha, however, gives Vijay a chance and takes him to Mumbai, where he completes the project. While they are in Mumbai, they stay at the house of one of the employees, Kishore, who calls Swecha "sister" because he thinks Swetha has a negative attitude towards men.

When they are done with the project plan and are executing the plan, Janardhan makes the plan fail again. This makes Vijay angry, and he thinks he is fit for nothing.

Before he leaves Mumbai, he finds out that Lahari and Swecha are friends and tells Lahari it was not her decision to break up with him. In order to complete the project, Vijay plans and executes an accident to prove his device's capability. After the accident, he is brought to court, where he is accused of being reckless and irresponsible in order to bring the app to public attention. The public prosecutor gives him a hard time with a barrage of allegations. During the interval, Lahari expresses her unconditional love for him. Once the session resumes, he is given the right to pursue his dream by the judge.

== Cast ==
- Sai Dharam Tej as Vijay Krishna "Vijay"
- Kalyani Priyadarshan as Lahari
- Nivetha Pethuraj as K. Swecha
- Sunil as Michael "Mike" / Glassmate
- Vennela Kishore as Kishore
- Posani Krishna Murali as Narayana, Vijay's father
- Brahmaji as Janardhan
- Himaja as Navneetha
- Pavitra Lokesh as Swecha's mother
- Jayaprakash as CEO
- Rohini Hattangadi as Judge
- Rao Ramesh as Lawyer Purushottham
- Bharath Reddy as Bharath
- Hyper Aadi as Ajay
- Prabhas Sreenu as Repair Shop Owner
- Sudharshan as Vijay's friend
- Yeisha Adarah as Lahari's friend

== Production ==
On 15 October 2018, it was announced that Kishore Tirumala will be directing Sai Dharam Tej's next movie, Chitralahari, on Mythri Movie Makers. On the same day, other cast and crew were announced. The regular shooting started from 19 November 2018 and completed by March 2019. The film was released on 12 April 2019.

== Music ==
Chitralahari

Soundtrack album by Devi Sri Prasad
- Released: 6 April 2019
- Genre: Feature film soundtrack
- Language: Telugu
- Label: Sony Music
- Producer: Devi Sri Prasad

Devi Sri Prasad chronology
F2 – Fun and Frustration (2019)	Chitralahari (2019)	Maharshi (2019)

Music is composed by Devi Sri Prasad.

Track list
No.	Title	Lyrics	Singer(s)	Length
1.	"Parugu Parugu"	Devi Sri Prasad	David Simon	3:34
2.	"Glassmates"	Chandrabose	Rahul Sipligunj, Penchal Das, Devi Sri Prasad	3:40
3.	"Prema Vennala"	Sri Mani	Sudharsan Ashok	3:30
4.	"Prayatname"	Chandrabose	Kailash Kher, Vishnupriya Ravi	2:19
Total length:				13:03

== Reception ==
=== Critical reception ===
The Hindu's Sangeethe Devi Dundoo, wrote that "Chitralahari has its moments, but the different thoughts and characters don’t blend into a cohesive narrative." Neeshita Nyapati of The Times of India, rated 3 out of 5 stars called it a "perfect summer watch." While praising the performance of the lead cast, Nyayapati wrote that "Unfortunately, it is the rest of the stupendous cast that get the short end of the stick, wasted in the roles given to them."

Hemanth Kumar writing for the Firstpost gave the film 2.5 out of 5. While praising Sai Dharam Tej's performance, Kumar opined that "Chitralahari ends up being a film that seemed far more interesting as an idea." Suresh Kavirayani of Deccan Chronicle also gave 2.5 out of five stars and wrote "Devi Sri Prasad’s songs are the high points of the film," while also adding that Karthik Ghattamaneni's cinematography and Kishore Tirumala's writing are decent. Jalapathy Gedelli of Telugucinema wrote "‘Chitralahari’ is passable drama that works in parts but leaves unsatisfying in the end with its preachy and dragged sequences. But turns out to be better film among Sai Dharam’s recent movies".

=== Box office ===
The film opened in USA with $234,000 during the opening weekend. By the end of its theatrical run, Chitralahari grossed around ₹25–27.1 crore worldwide.
