= Vishnupriya Ravi =

Playback singer (b. 1992)

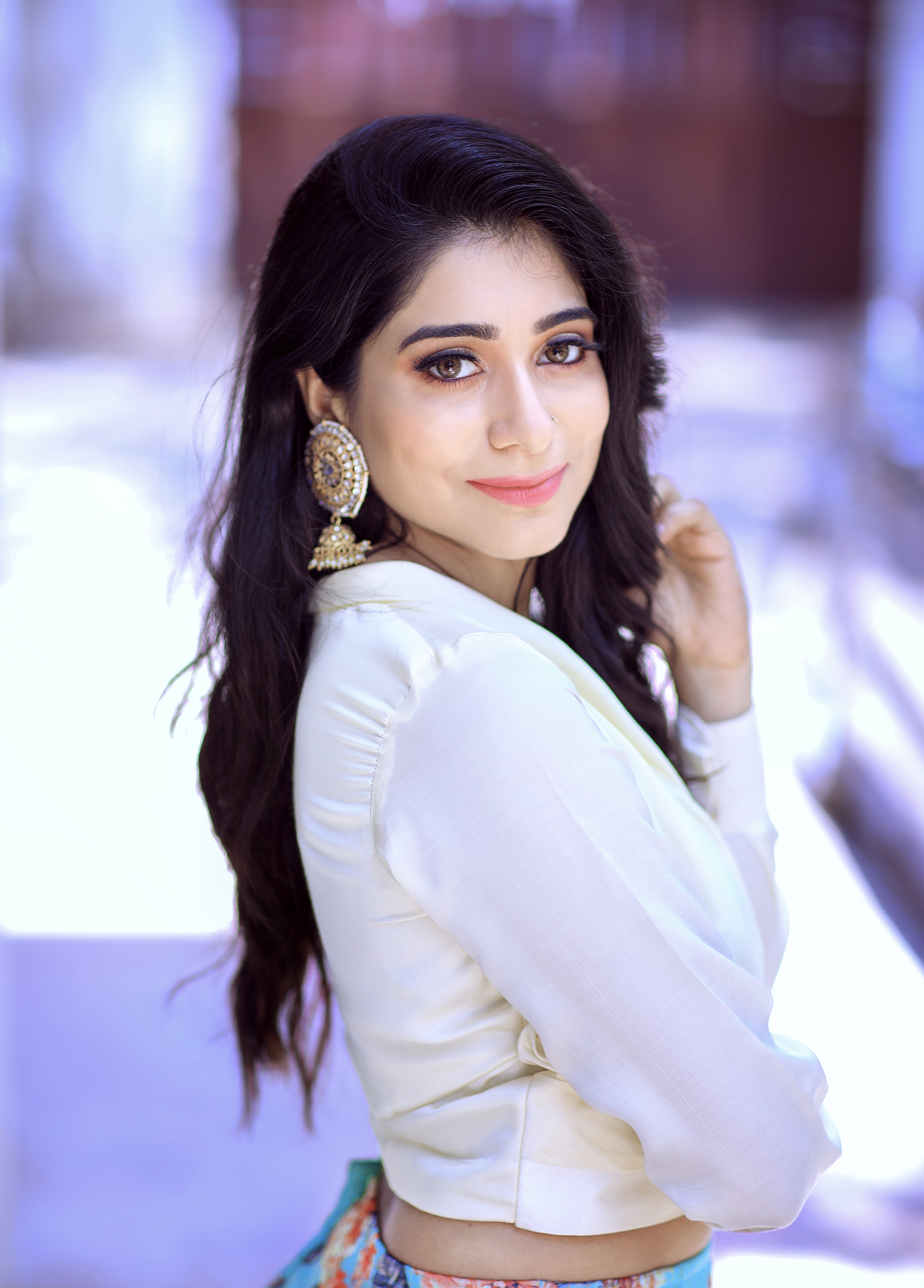
- Born: 18 October 1992 (age 33)
- Education: M.O.P. Vaishnav College for Women
- Occupation: Singer
- Years active: 2013-present

Vishnupriya Ravi (born 18 October 1992), is an Indian playback singer and live performer.

== Career ==
Vishnupriya found her passion for music at the age of 9 which led her parents to enroll her in music school. She trained in carnatic, hindustani and western classical. In 2013, she began her career as a playback singer with the song Chellakutty in the movie Vallavanukku Pullum Aayudham composed by Siddharth Vipin. In 2016, she was nominated for Filmfare Award for Best Female Playback Singer – Telugu for the song Parashunara from the movie Dhruva along with Padmalatha. The song "Everest Anchuna" from the 2019 film Maharshi has become an instant chartbuster, with a 1.8 million views in YouTube within a day of its preview video release and won her Santosham Film Awards for Best Female Playback Singer.

== Personal life ==
Vishnupriya was born and brought up in Chennai, Tamil Nadu. She did her schooling at P. S. Senior Secondary School and graduated from M.O.P. Vaishnav College for Women.

== Discography ==
Year	Film	Song	Language	Composer	Co-singers
2013	Idharkuthane Aasaipattai Balakumara	"Yaen Endral"	Tamil	Siddharth Vipin	Hariharan, Maalavika Manoj
2014	Vallavanukku Pullum Aayudham	"Chellakkutti"	Tamil	Siddharth Vipin	Ranjith
2015	Aambala	"Madras to Madurai"	Tamil	Hiphop Tamizha	Kailash Kher, Maria Roe Vincent
2015	Maha Maharaju (Dubbed version)	"Hyderabad to Vizag"	Telugu	Hiphop Tamizha	Hariharasudhan
2016	Kadavul Irukaan Kumaru	"Nee Pona Theruvula"	Tamil	G. V. Prakash Kumar	G. V. Prakash Kumar, MC Vickey
2016	Dhruva	"Pareshanura"	Telugu	Hiphop Tamizha	Padmalatha
2018	Iruttu Araiyil Murattu Kuththu	"IAMK Party Song"	Tamil	Balamurali Balu	Adithya Surendar, Suchitra, Teejay Arunasalam
2019	Chikati Gadilo Chithakotudu	"Party Song"	Telugu	Balamurali Balu	Nivas, Yazin Nizar
2019	Chitralahari	"Prayathname"	Telugu	Devi Sri Prasad	Kailash Kher
2019	Maharshi	"Everest Anchuna"	Telugu	Devi Sri Prasad	Vedala Hemachandra
2019	Hippi	"Viral"	Telugu	Balamurali Balu	Raghu Dixit, Christopher Stanley
2019	Tenali Ramakrishna BA. BL	"Peechumittai Pillaro"	Telugu	Sai Karthik	Dathu
2020	Anukunnadi Okati Ayinadi Okati	"Killi Veddam Lolli Cheddam"	Telugu	Vikas Badisha	Roll Rida
2020	Irandam Kuththu	"Thabela Thabela"	Tamil	S. N. Prasad	Diwakar
2021	Bro	"Anandham"	Telugu	Shekar Chandra	Yazin Nizar
2021	Anandham Vilayadum Veedu	"Katti Karumbae"	Tamil	Siddhu Kumar	Saisharan
2023	Pallu Padama Paathuka	"Kovama Kuttyma"	Tamil	Balamurali Balu	
