= Hemachandra (singer) =

Indian musical artist (born 1988)

Vedala Hemachandra
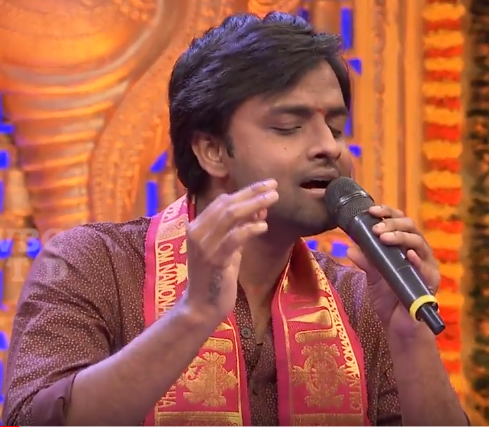
- Hemachandra during a stage performance

Background information
- Born: 2 June 1988 (age 38)
- Origin: Hyderabad, Telangana, India
- Occupations: Playback singer; dubbing artist; music director
- Instrument: Vocals
- Years active: 2004—present
- Spouse: Sravana Bhargavi

Vedala Hemachandra (born 2 June 1988) is an Indian independent artist, playback singer, and music director known for his works in Telugu cinema. He has won Filmfare Award for Best Male Playback Singer – Telugu in 2018 for the song "Oosupodhu" from Fidaa.

== Early life ==
Hemachandra is born on June 2, 1988. Hemachandra's mother Sasikala Swamy Vedala is a singer and music teacher, father Swamy Vedala is an advocate. Hemachandra has a sister Himabindu, she is a playback singer and music teacher. Hemachandra married singer Sravana Bhargavi on 14 February 2013. They have a daughter named Shikara, who was born on 2 July 2016. He sung the jingle "Hook Aipodam" along with Sahithi Chaganti, in September 2021, for Red FM 93.5. It was part of radio's effort to reflect the style and culture of the two Telugu states - Andhra Pradesh and Telangana. Hemachandra studied at All Saints High School, Hyderabad.

== Discography ==
=== As an independent artist ===
Year	Title	Notes
2019	Shambore	
2020	Tara	
2020	Kotha Kotha Oohalenno	
2020	Bokkettene	
2021	Koyila	
2021	Yathana	
2021	Ayya	Featuring Roll Rida and PVNS Rohit
2022	Rabba	
2022	One Love	
2022	TBA	Releasing as a part of Instagram's #1MinMusic

=== As playback singer ===
==== Telugu songs ====
Year	Work	Song	Composer
2026	Gaayapadda Simham	"Brutal Dharma"	Sweekar Agasthi
2026	Bad Boy Karthik	"My Dear Janathaa"	Harris Jayaraj
2025	Kuberaa	"Trance of Kuberaa"	Devi Sri Prasad
2025	3BHK	"Kalalanni"	Amrit Ramnath
2025	Idli Kadai - (((D)))	"Ennaallakochhade"	G. V. Prakash Kumar
2024	Shivam Bhaje	"Shivam Bhaje Theme"	Vikas Badisa
2024	Paarijatha Parvam	"Rang Rang Rangeela"	Ree
2024	Masthu Shades Unnai Raa	"Chinni Jeevithame"	Sanjeev T
2024	Kismat	"Kismat Title Song"	Mark K Robin
2022	O Kala	"Entha Sokugadu"	Neelesh Mandalapu
2022	Yemaipothaney	"Naa Manassu Aashale"	Vasanth.G
2022	Liger	"The Liger Hunt Theme"	Vikram Montrose
2022	Pakka Commercial	"Pakka Commercial Title Song"	Jakes Bejoy
2022	Sakala Gunabhirama	"Chal Chal Chalo "	Anudeep Dev
2022	Iravatham	"Bujji Meka"	Satya Kasyap
2021	Devarakondalo Vijay Premakatha	"Anandam"	Sadachandra
2021	Hemachandra Originals	"Yathana"	Vedala Hemachandra
2021	Pelli SandaD	"Pelli SandaD"	M. M. Keeravani
2021	RRR	"Dosti"	M. M. Keeravani
2021	Ek Mini Katha	"I Hate My Life'u"	Pravin Lakkaraju
2021	Vakeel Saab	"Kadhulu Kadhulu"	S. Thaman
2021	Alludu Adhurs	"Rambha Oorvashi Menaka"	Devi Sri Prasad
2021	Nallamalla	"Nallamala Theme"	PR
2021	Tongi Tongi Chudamaku Chandamama	"Life Antene"	Hari Gowra
2021	Cycle	''Emaindo Emo''	G. M. Sathish
2020	IIT Krishnamurthy	"Samayam Jaripe"	Naresh Kumaran
2020	Colour Photo	"College Song"	Kaala Bhairava
2020	Hemachandra Originals	"Tara"	Vedala Hemachandra
2019	Thipparaa Meesam	"Thipparaa Meesam (Title Track)"	Suresh Bobbili
2019	Meeku Maathrame Cheptha	La la la	Sivakumar
2019	Kalki	Evaro Evaro	Shravan Bharadwaj
2019	Maharshi	Everest Anchuna	Devi Sri Prasad
2019	F2: Fun and Frustration	Dhan Dhan	Devi Sri Prasad
2017	Malli Raava	Welcome back to Love	Shravan Bharadwaj
2017	Fidaa	Fidaa	Shakthi Kanth
2017	Fidaa	Oosupodu	Shakthi Kanth
2017	Rogue	Adadhante	Sunil Kashyap
2017	Jai Lava Kusa	Nee Kallalona	Devi Sri Prasad
2017	Babu Baga Busy	Title song (Babu Baga Busy)	Sunil Kashyap
2017	Babu Baga Busy	Ee Pilla	Sunil Kashyap
2017	Lakshmi Bomb	Tharumu Tharumu	Sunil Kashyap
2016	Janaki Ramudu	Life ante	Gifton Elias
2016	Karam Dosa	Dosalu posi desanni	Siddarth Watkins
2016	Oka Manasu	Emito Ee Kshanam	Sunil Kashyap
2016	Oka Manasu	Ninna Lenantha	Sunil Kashyap
2016	Kalavathi	Povaddhe	Hiphop Tamizha
2015	Shivam	Gunde Aagi Pothaande	Devi Sri Prasad
2015	Krishnamma Kalipindi Iddarini	Ola Ola	Hari
2014	Raghuvaran B. Tech (Dubbed version)	Chudandi Saaru	Anirudh Ravichander
2014	Raghuvaran B. Tech (Dubbed version)	Ori Devuda	Anirudh Ravichander
2014	Salim (Dubbed version)	Ninnu Choose	Vijay Antony
2014	Oohalu Gusagusalade	Inthakante Vere	Kalyan Koduri
2014	Rough	Nandu I Love You	Mani Sharma
2014	Eduruleni Alexander	Alexander	Dr. Josyabatla Sarma
2014	Eduruleni Alexander	Guleba Kavali	Dr. Josyabatla Sarma
2013	Shadow	Pilla Manchi Bandhobasthu	S. Thaman
2013	Baadshah	Baadshah	S. Thaman
2012	Denikaina Ready	Pillandham Keka Keka	Chakri
2012	Yamudiki Mogudu: Ee Nela Thakkuvodu	Pistolu Pilladanivo	Koti
2012	Endukante... Premanta!	Yegiri Pove	G. V. Prakash Kumar
2012	Daruvu	Athiri Chirabara	Vijay Antony
2012	Racha	Oka Padam	Mani Sharma
2012	Cameraman Gangatho Rambabu	Taladinchuku	Mani Sharma
2012	Cameraman Gangatho Rambabu	Extraordinary	Mani Sharma
2012	Cameraman Gangatho Rambabu	Theme Song	Mani Sharma
2011	Seema Tapakai	Kandi Chenu	Vandemataram Srinivas
2011	Solo	Marumallela Vaana	Mani Sharma
2011	Shakti	"Prema Desam"	Mani Sharma
2011	Panjaa	Paparayudu	Yuvan Shankar Raja
2011	Kandireega	Premey	S. Thaman
2010	Happy Happy Ga	Madhuranubhavama	Mani Sharma
2010	Happy Happy Ga	Putukku Jara Jar	Mani Sharma
2010	Khaleja	Pileche Pedavula Paina	Mani Sharma
2010	Don Seenu	Andhamemo Istaraku	Mani Sharma
2010	Varudu	Aidu Rojula Pelli	Mani Sharma
2010	Varudu	Kalalu Kaavule	Mani Sharma
2009	Baanam	Naalo Nenena	Mani Sharma
2009	Konchem Ishtam Konchem Kashtam	Egire Egire	Shankar–Ehsaan–Loy
2009	Billa	Bommali	Mani Sharma
2009	Ek Niranjan	Gundello	Mani Sharma
2008	Parugu	Hrudayam	Mani Sharma
2008	Hero	Naa Vayase	Mani Sharma
2008	Pourudu	Nee Pakkanunte	Mani Sharma
2007	Lakshyam	Niluvave	

==== Other language songs ====
Year	Work	Song	Language	Music director
2006	Dil Diya Hai	Chalo Dildar Chalo	Hindi	Himesh Reshammiya
2010	Sura	Thanjavoor Jillakkari	Tamil	Mani Sharma
2010	I Am Sorry Mathe Banni Preethsona	Zoozoobaa	Kannada	Anoop Seelin
2012	Oru Kal Oru Kannadi	Kaadhal Oru	Tamil	Harris Jayaraj
2012	Maalai Pozhudhin Mayakathilaey	Oh Baby Girl	Tamil	Achu Rajamani
2014	Nimirndhu Nil	Rajadhi Raja	Tamil	G. V. Prakash Kumar
2014	Salim	Unnai Kanda Naal	Tamil	Vijay Antony
2017	Rogue	Hennu Andre Abaleyalla	Kannada	Sunil Kashyap

=== As music director ===
Year	Film
2009	Ride
2010	Maa Nanna Chiranjeevi
2012	All the Best
2016	Ramasakani Rakumarudu

== Filmography ==
=== As dubbing artist ===
Year	Title	Dubbed For	Source
2008	Rainbow	Rahul	
2012	Racha	Mukesh Rishi	
2012	Krishnam Vande Jagadgurum	Milind Gunaji	
2016	Dhruva	Arvind Swamy	
2016	Sarrainodu	Mukul Dev	
2016	Kanche	Nikitin Dheer	
2016	Oopiri	Karthi	
2017	Om Namo Venkatesaya	Saurabh Raj Jain	
2017	Paisa Vasool	Vikramjeet Virk	
2017	Goutham Nanda	Mukesh Rishi	
2017	Jawaan	Prasanna	
2017	Raja the Great	Vivan Bhatena	
2017	Lie	Ravi Kishan	
2017	Jaya Janaki Nayaka	Tarun Arora	
2018	Bharath Ane Nenu	Yashpal Sharma	
2018	Savyasachi	R. Madhavan	
2018	Kavacham	Neil Nitin Mukesh	
2019	Gaddalakonda Ganesh	Atharvaa	
2020	Aswathama	Jisshu Sengupta	
2020	Maestro	Jisshu Sengupta	
2020	Bheeshma	Jisshu Sengupta	
2020	Dhira	Vivek Oberoi	
2021	Acharya	Jisshu Sengupta	Hotstar web series
2022	RRR	Ajay Devgn	
2022	Vaarasudu	Shaam	Dubbed version
2023	Hi Nanna	Angad Bedi	
2025	Kuberaa	Jim Sarbh	Telugu version only
2025	Hari Hara Veera Mallu	Makarand Deshpande	
2025	They Call Him OG	Emraan Hashmi	Telugu version Only
