= Raju Sundaram =

Indian choreographer, actor, director (born 1968)

- Born: 6 September 1968 (age 58); Mysore, Mysore State (now Karnataka), India
- Occupations: Choreographer; Actor; Film director
- Years active: 1992–present
- Spouse: Lalitha
- Children: 2
- Father: Mugur Sundar
- Relatives: Prabhu Deva (brother); Nagendra Prasad (brother)

Raju Sundaram (born 6 September 1968) is an Indian dance choreographer, actor and film director, who works primarily in Tamil, Telugu films also appeared in Kannada and Malayalam films. He appeared as an actor in films like Jeans (1998), 123 (2002), I Love You Da (2002), Quick Gun Murugun (2009); and directed one film, Aegan (2008).

He won the National Film Award for Best Choreography for his work in the song "Pranamam Pranamam" song from the film Janatha Garage (2016) and "Everest Anchuna" song from the film Maharshi (2019).

== Personal life ==
Sundaram is the son of dancer Mugur Sundar, and the elder brother of choreographers Prabhu Deva and Nagendra Prasad. He was rumored to be in a relationship with Simran in the late 1990s.

== Career ==
Sundaram began his career assisting as a choreographer for his father Mugur Sundar's projects, before going on to lead troupes. He was a dancer in "Rukkumani Rukkumani" from Mani Ratnam's Roja (1992) and in Aasai (1995). He also regularly featured in cameo appearances in songs featuring his brother Prabhu Deva, with the pair making appearances in Shankar's early films Gentleman (1993) and Kaadhalan (1994). After being the lead choreographer for a few Kannada films, his first break came through Mani Ratnam's Thiruda Thiruda (1993), where he was given the chance to design dances for three songs. He then went on to become a choreographer of Tamil directors Mani Ratnam and Shankar, and worked on Amitabh Bachchan's album, Aby Baby (1996).

Shankar then offered Sundaram an acting opportunity in his romantic comedy Jeans (1998), where Sundaram played a full-length role. He played the lead in the sports drama I Love You Da (2002) alongside his former girlfriend and actress Simran. The Hindu stated the film proves "serious acting is simply not his cup of tea". After working on an unreleased film titled Colombus, he then went on to feature in the trilingual One Two Three (2003) alongside Jyothika and his brothers. The film opened to mixed reviews and did not perform well at the box office. He has since primarily operated as a choreographer, making a few exceptions by starring in comic roles in Jeeva's Unnale Unnale (2007), Prabhu Deva's Engeyum Kadhal (2011) and in the Telugu film, Action 3D (2013).

== Filmography ==
=== Choreographer ===
List of film choreography credits
Year	Title	Language
1992	Chembaruthi	Tamil
1992	Pandiyan	Tamil
1992	Bol Radha Bol	Hindi
1993	Walter Vetrivel	Tamil
1993	Aagraham	Telugu
1993	Uzhaippali	Tamil
1993	Gentleman	Tamil
1993	Udan Pirappu	Tamil
1993	Kizhakke Varum Paattu	Tamil
1993	Thiruda Thiruda	Tamil
1993	Senthoorapandi	Tamil
1993	Gandharvam	Malayalam
1994	Sethupathi IPS	Tamil
1994	Indhu	Tamil
1994	Jai Hind	Tamil
1994	Duet	Tamil
1994	Rasigan	Tamil
1994	Ulavaali	Tamil
1994	Kaadhalan	Tamil
1994	May Madham	Tamil
1994	Karuththamma	Tamil
1994	Criminal	Telugu; Hindi
1995	Gundaraj	Hindi
1995	Bombay	Tamil
1995	Coolie	Tamil
1995	Karnaa	Tamil
1995	Chinna Vathiyar	Tamil
1995	Aasai	Tamil
1995	Makkal Aatchi	Tamil
1995	Neela Kuyil	Tamil
1995	Ayudha Poojai	Tamil
1995	Barsaat	Hindi
1995	Thotta Chinungi	Tamil
1996	Sahasa Veerudu Sagara Kanya	Telugu
1996	Majhdhaar	Hindi
1996	Love Birds	Tamil
1996	Sengottai	Tamil
1996	Indian	Tamil
1996	Kadhal Desam	Tamil
1996	Mr. Romeo	Tamil
1996	Nethaji	Tamil
1996	Tu Chor Main Sipahi	Hindi
1996	Krishna	Hindi
1997	Sakthi	Tamil
1997	Mrityudata	Hindi
1997	Bhai	Hindi
1997	Raasi	Tamil
1997	Nerukku Ner	Tamil
1997	Ratchagan	Tamil
1997	Auzaar	Hindi
1997	Ziddi	Hindi
1998	Jab Pyaar Kisise Hota Hai	Hindi
1998	Jeans	Tamil
1998	Aval Varuvala	Tamil
1998	Harichandra	Tamil
1998	Barood	Hindi
1998	Sollamale	Tamil
1998	Kannedhirey Thondrinal	Tamil
1998	Kadhal Kavithai	Tamil
1999	Thullatha Manamum Thullum	Tamil
1999	En Swasa Kaatre	Tamil
1999	Love You Hamesha	Hindi
1999	Ethirum Pudhirum	Tamil
1999	Poomagal Oorvalam	Tamil
1999	Vaalee	Tamil
1999	Anantha Poongatre	Tamil
1999	Nenjinile	Tamil
1999	Kadhalar Dhinam	Tamil
1999	Poovellam Kettuppar	Tamil
1999	Kannodu Kanbathellam	Tamil
1999	Nee Varuvai Ena	Tamil
1999	Jodi	Tamil
1999	Kannupada Poguthaiya	Tamil
1999	Taj Mahal	Tamil
2000	Millennium Stars	Malayalam
2000	Dada Sahib	Malayalam
2000	Pukar	Hindi
2000	Kannukkul Nilavu	Tamil
2000	Good Luck	Tamil
2000	Sandhitha Velai	Tamil
2000	Kandukondain Kandukondain	Tamil
2000	Kushi	Tamil
2000	Appu	Tamil
2000	Pennin Manathai Thottu	Tamil
2000	Parthen Rasithen	Tamil
2000	Maayi	Tamil
2000	Rhythm	Tamil
2000	Priyamaanavale	Tamil
2000	Snegithiye	Tamil
2001	Albela	Hindi
2001	Aks	Hindi
2001	Daddy	Telugu
2001	Yeh Teraa Ghar Yeh Meraa Ghar	Hindi
2001	Friends	Tamil
2001	Badri	Tamil
2001	Poovellam Un Vasam	Tamil
2001	Vedham	Tamil
2001	Samudhiram	Tamil
2001	12B	Tamil
2001	Shajahan	Tamil
2001	Kadal Pookkal	Tamil
2001	Majunu	Tamil
2002	Punnagai Desam	Tamil
2002	Red	Tamil
2002	Kamarasu	Tamil
2002	Thamizhan	Tamil
2002	123	Tamil
2002	Pyaar Diwana Hota Hai	Hindi
2002	Indra	Telugu
2002	Youth	Tamil
2002	Run	Tamil
2002	Arputham	Tamil
2002	I Love You Da	Tamil
2003	Aasai Aasaiyai	Tamil
2003	Parasuram	Tamil
2003	Paarai	Tamil
2003	Thithikudhe	Tamil
2003	Boys	Tamil
2003	Alai	Tamil
2003	Thirumalai	Tamil
2003	Anjaneya	Tamil
2003	Enakku 20 Unakku 18	Tamil; Telugu
2003	Soori	Tamil
2003	Tagore	Telugu
2004	Udhaya	Tamil
2004	Ghilli	Tamil
2004	Aethiree	Tamil
2004	Madhurey	Tamil
2004	Chellamae	Tamil
2004	Run	Hindi
2004	Attagasam	Tamil
2004	Donga Dongadi	Telugu
2004	Malliswari	Telugu
2004	Kyun! Ho Gaya Na...	Hindi
2004	Gudumba Shankar	Telugu
2004	Sye	Telugu
2004	Shankar Dada MBBS	Telugu
2004	Hulchul	Hindi
2005	Netaji Subhas Chandra Bose: The Forgotten Hero	Hindi
2005	Thirupaachi	Tamil
2005	Ji	Tamil
2005	Maayavi	Tamil
2005	Chandramukhi	Tamil
2005	Sachein	Tamil
2005	Ullam Ketkumae	Tamil
2005	Anniyan	Tamil
2005	Ponniyin Selvan	Tamil
2005	Oru Naal Oru Kanavu	Tamil
2005	Athadu	Telugu
2005	Ghajini	Tamil
2005	No Entry	Hindi
2005	Dil Jo Bhi Kahey...	Hindi
2005	Majaa	Tamil
2005	Sandakozhi	Tamil
2005	Jai Chiranjeeva	Telugu
2006	Kalvanin Kadhali	Tamil
2006	Kusthi	Tamil
2006	Lakshmi	Telugu
2006	Happy	Telugu
2006	Unakkum Enakkum	Tamil
2006	Varalaru: The History of Godfather	Tamil
2006	Thiruvilaiyaadal Aarambam	Tamil
2006	Bangaram	Telugu
2006	Stalin	Telugu
2006	Rakhi	Telugu
2007	Pokkiri	Tamil
2007	Godava	Telugu
2007	Unnale Unnale	Tamil
2007	Desamuduru	Telugu
2007	Sivaji: The Boss	Tamil
2007	Thottal Poo Malarum	Tamil
2007	Aarya	Tamil
2007	Marudhamalai	Tamil
2007	Lakshyam	Telugu
2007	Yamadonga	Telugu
2007	Tulasi	Telugu
2008	Dhaam Dhoom	Tamil
2008	Aegan	Tamil
2009	Villu	Tamil
2009	Ayan	Tamil
2009	Ek Niranjan	Telugu
2009	Wanted	Hindi
2010	Aasal	Tamil
2010	Theeradha Vilaiyattu Pillai	Tamil
2010	Kacheri Arambam	Tamil
2010	Paiyaa	Tamil
2010	Don Seenu	Telugu
2010	Sura	Tamil
2010	Khaleja	Telugu
2010	Enthiran: The Robot	Tamil
2010	Brindavanam	Telugu
2011	Kaavalan	Tamil
2011	Mappillai	Tamil
2011	Engeyum Kadhal	Tamil
2012	Vettai	Tamil
2012	Billa II	Tamil
2012	Julai	Telugu
2013	Alex Pandian	Tamil
2013	Singam II	Tamil
2013	Chennai Express	Hindi
2013	Pattathu Yaanai	Tamil
2013	Idharkuthane Aasaipattai Balakumara	Tamil
2013	All in All Azhagu Raja	Tamil
2013	Endrendrum Punnagai	Tamil
2013	Biriyani	Tamil
2013	Bhai	Telugu
2014	Jilla	Tamil
2014	Bramman	Tamil
2014	Ennamo Nadakkudhu	Tamil
2014	Kochadaiiyaan	Tamil
2014	Anjaan	Tamil
2014	Sigaram Thodu	Tamil
2014	Mukunda	Telugu
2014	Kaaviya Thalaivan	Tamil
2015	Srimanthudu	Telugu
2015	Bajrangi Bhaijaan	Hindi
2015	Anegan	Tamil
2015	Kaaki Sattai	Tamil
2015	Inimey Ippadithaan	Tamil
2015	Kaaval	Tamil
2015	Run Raja Run	Telugu
2015	Jil	Telugu
2015	Puli	Tamil
2015	Size Zero	Telugu; Tamil
2015	Temper	Telugu
2016	Nannaku Prematho	Telugu
2016	Saagasam Enra Veerachayal	Tamil
2016	Thozha	Telugu; Tamil
2016	Natpadhigaram 79	Tamil
2016	24	Tamil
2016	Express Raja	Telugu
2016	Enakku Innoru Per Irukku	Tamil
2016	Janatha Garage	Telugu
2016	Remo	Tamil
2016	Rekka	Tamil
2016	Kaashmora	Tamil
2016	Brahmotsavam	Telugu
2016	Balle Vellaiyathevaa	Tamil
2017	Bogan	Tamil
2017	Kadamban	Tamil
2017	Kaadhali	Telugu
2017	Winner	Telugu
2017	Kodi Veeran	Tamil
2017	Sakka Podu Podu Raja	Tamil
2018	Mannar Vagera	Tamil
2018	Junga	Tamil
2018	Aravinda Sametha Veera Raghava	Telugu
2018	Sandakozhi 2	Tamil
2018	Bharat Ane Nenu	Telugu
2019	Irupathiyonnaam Noottaandu	Malayalam
2019	Saaho	Telugu; Hindi
2019	Rustum	Kannada
2019	Maharshi	Telugu
2019	Pailwaan	Kannada
2019	Sanga Thamizhan	Tamil
2019	Seeru	Tamil
2019	Hero	Tamil
2020	Darbar	Tamil
2020	Ka Pae Ranasingam	Tamil
2021	Kalathil Santhippom	Tamil
2021	Krack	Telugu
2021	Tughlaq Durbar	Tamil
2021	Raajavamsam	Tamil
2021	Republic	Telugu
2021	Maanaadu	Tamil
2021	Kotigobba 3	Kannada
2022	Varalaru Mukkiyam	Tamil
2022	The Legend	Tamil
2022	Coffee with Kadhal	Tamil
2023	Varisu	Tamil
2023	Bagheera	Tamil
2023	Bommai	Tamil
2024	The Greatest of All Time	Tamil
2024	Devara: Part 1	Telugu
2025	Jack	Telugu
2026	The RajaSaab	Telugu

Key
†	Denotes films that have not yet been released

=== Director ===
List of film directing credits
Year	Title	Language
2008	Aegan	Tamil

=== Actor ===
List of film acting credits
Year	Title	Role	Language	Notes
1998	Jeans	Madhesh	Tamil	
1999	En Swasa Katre	Raju	Tamil	Special appearance
2002	Manasella Neene	Arun	Kannada	
2002	I Love You Da	Raju	Tamil	
2003	123	Pazhani	Tamil	
2006	Pellaina Kothalo	Prakash	Telugu	
2007	Unnale Unnale	Raju	Tamil	
2009	Quick Gun Murugun	Rowdy MBA	English	
2011	Engeyum Kaadhal	Raju	Tamil	
2012	Julai	Himself	Telugu	Special appearances
2013	Mirchi	Himself	Telugu	Special appearances
2013	Action 3D	Purush	Telugu	
2015	Isai	Himself	Tamil	Special appearance
2017	Yaanum Theeyavan	Pasupathy	Tamil	
2018	Padi Padi Leche Manasu	Goon	Telugu	Special appearance
2024	Maa Nanna Superhero		Telugu	
2025	Ghaati	Pebbuli	Telugu	
2026	Sigma	Neil	Tamil	

=== Dancer ===
List of film dancing credits
Year	Film	Song	Language	Notes
1991	Assembly Rowdy	"Turpu Kondallo"	Telugu	
1991	Idhayam	"Ohh Party Nalla"	Tamil	
1992	Donga Police	"Devudanno Dandam Pedatha"	Telugu	
1992	Roja	"Rukumani Rukumani"	Tamil	
1992	Suriyan	"Thoongu Moonchi"	Tamil	
1993	Enga Thambi	"Ithu Maanodum"	Tamil	
1993	Gentleman	"Chikku Bukku"	Tamil	
1994	Captain	"Oyyari Buggameedu"	Telugu	
1994	Lockup Death	"Current Banthu"	Kannada	
1994	Police War	"Teenage Papa"	Telugu	
1994	Jai Hind	"Bodhai Yeri Pochu"	Tamil	
1994	Kaadhalan	"Kadhalikkum Pennin"	Tamil	
1995	Mounam	"Dhammaro Abbaya Raro"	Telugu	
1995	Aasai	"Meenamma", "Shockkadikuthu Sona"	Tamil	
1997	Ullaasam	"Valibam Vaazha Sollum"	Tamil	
1998	Sollamale	"Allamma Samba"	Tamil	
1999	Kadhal Kavithai	"Aalana Naal Mudhala"	Tamil	
1999	Circle Inspector	"Urmila Urmila"	Kannada	
1999	Kya Soorat Hai	"Kya Soorat Hai"	Hindi	Music Video, song from Bombay Vikings band
1999	En Swasa Kaatre	"Jumbalaka"	Tamil	
1999	Ethirum Pudhirum	"Thottu Thottu"	Tamil	
1999	Anantha Poongatre	"Meenatchi Meenatchi"	Tamil	
1999	Poovellam Kettuppar	"O Senorita"	Tamil	
2000	Sandhitha Velai	"Muniyamma"	Tamil	
2000	Pennin Manathai Thottu	"Saltkotta"	Tamil	
2000	Maayi	"Thennagam Aalum"	Tamil	
2000	Rhythm	"Ayyayyo Pathikichu"	Tamil	
2000	Chamundi	"Usarvalli Kshnakondu"	Kannada	
2001	Aks	"Banda Bindas"	Hindi	
2001	Poovellam Un Vaasam	"Yukta Mookhey"	Tamil	
2002	Vicky	"Chokku Smilea"	Tamil	
2003	Alai	"Alai Adikuthu"	Tamil	
2005	Ullam Ketkumae	"Mazhai Mazhai"	Tamil	
2005	Anniyan	"O Sukumari"	Tamil	
2005	Modati Cinema	"Ninnyna Nadyna"	Telugu	
2009	Konchem Ishtam Konchem Kashtam	"Evade Subramanyam"	Telugu	
2010	Pa. Ra. Palanisamy	"Netru Varai Unakku"	Tamil	
2012	Vettai	"Dhum Dhum"	Tamil	
2013	Idharkuthane Aasaipattai Balakumara	"En Veettula"	Tamil	
2013	Endrendrum Punnagai	"Ennatha Solla"	Tamil	
2014	Ennamo Nadakkudhu	"Money Money"	Tamil	
2016	Thozha	"Door Number One"	Tamil	
2016	Natpadhigaram 79	"Sollu Sollu Chellamma"	Tamil	
2016	Devi	"Chal Maar"	Tamil	
2016	Abhinetri	"Chal Maar"	Telugu	
2016	Tutak Tutak Tutiya	"Chal Maar"	Hindi	
2016	Remo	"Tamilselvi"	Tamil	
2016	Kaashmora	"Dhikku Dhikku Sir"	Tamil	
2017	Bogan	"Damaalu Dumeelu"	Tamil	
2019	Sangathamizhan	"Oh My God"	Tamil	
2021	Tughlaq Durbar	"Arasiyal Kedi"	Tamil	

== Awards ==
Won

- 1994 Tamil Nadu State Film Award for Best Choreographer -Kaadhalan
- 1997 Dinakaran Award for Best Dance Director – Many movies
- 1998 Tamil Nadu State Film Award for Best Choreographer – Jeans
- 1998 Dinakaran Award for Best Dance Director – Many movies
- 1999 Dinakaran Award for Best Dance Master – Many movies
- 1999 Cinema Express Award for Best Dance Master – Many movies
- 2000 Dinakaran Award for Best Dance Master – Many movies
- 2004 Dinakaran-Medimix Award for Best Choreographer – Ghilli
- 2004 Filmfare Award for Best Choreography – South – Ghilli
- 2009 Ananda Vikatan Cinema Award for Best Choreographer – Villu
- 2010 Tamil Nadu State Film Award for Best Choreographer – Paiyaa
- 2010 Filmfare Award for Best Choreography – South - Brindavanam
- 2011 Ananda Vikatan Cinema Award for Best Choreographer – Engeyum Kadhal
- 2013 Edison Award for Best Choreographer – Biriyani
- 2016 National Film Award for Best Choreography-Janatha Garage (for "Pranaamam")
- 2019 National Film Award for Best Choreography-Maharshi (for "Everest Anchuna")
- 2007 Vijay Award for Best Choreographer – Unnale Unnale
- 2010 Vijay Award for Best Choreographer – Enthiran
- 2011 Vijay Award for Best Choreographer – Engeyum Kadhal
- 2014 South Indian International Movie Award for Best Dance Choreographer – Anjaan
- 2014 Vijay Award for Best Choreographer – Kaaviya Thalaivan

== Legacy ==
Choreographers and artists L. L. Cool Jayanth, Ravi Dev, Ashok Raja, Dinesh, Sridhar, Shobi Paulraj, Baba Bhaskar, Kalyan, Johny, Noble Paul, Prem Rakshith, Jani, Lalitha Shobi, Sathish Krishnan, Viji Sathish, Poppy, Japan Kumar, Sindhuja, Nanditha Jennifer, Raja, Shanthi Arvind, Anusha Swamy, Boopathy & Vasanthi had worked as dancers and assistants to him.
