= Santosham Best Screenplay Award =

Indian film award

The Santosham Best Screenplay Award is given by the Santosham Film magazine as part of its annual Santosham Film Awards for Telugu films.

The award was first given in 2003. Here is a list of the award winners and the films for which they won.

Year	Writer	Film	Ref
2009	Chinna	Aa Intlo
2008	Krish	Gamyam
2007	Sekhar Kammula	Happy Days
2006
2005
2004	M.S. Raju	Varsham
2003	G. Neelakanta Reddy	Missamma
