= Maharshi (2019 film) =

2019 Indian film by Vamshi Paidipally

- Theatrical release poster
- Directed by: Vamshi Paidipally
- Written by: Vamshi Paidipally; Hari; Ahishor Solomon
- Produced by: Dil Raju; Sirish; C. Aswani Dutt; Prasad V. Potluri; Kavin Anne
- Starring: Mahesh Babu; Allari Naresh; Pooja Hegde
- Cinematography: K. U. Mohanan
- Edited by: Praveen K. L.
- Music by: Devi Sri Prasad
- Production companies: Sri Venkateswara Creations; Vyjayanthi Movies; PVP Cinema
- Distributed by: Great India films (USA)
- Release date: 9 May 2019
- Running time: 178 minutes
- Country: India
- Language: Telugu
- Budget: ₹60 crore
- Box office: ₹200 crore

Maharshi (transl. 'Great sage') is a 2019 Indian Telugu-language action drama film directed and co-written by Vamshi Paidipally and produced by Sri Venkateswara Creations, Vyjayanthi Movies, and PVP Cinema. It stars Mahesh Babu, Allari Naresh and Pooja Hegde, along with an ensemble cast of Jagapathi Babu, Prakash Raj, Jayasudha, Rao Ramesh, Vennela Kishore, Sai Kumar, Kamal Kamaraju and Meenakshi Dixit. The music was composed by Devi Sri Prasad.

Maharshi was a commercial success and became the third highest grossing Telugu film of 2019 and one of the highest-grossing Telugu films. At the 67th National Film Awards, Maharshi won in two categories: the Best Popular Film Providing Wholesome Entertainment and Best Choreography. It also fetched the state Telangana Gaddar Film Award for Best Feature Film, five SIIMA Awards and two Zee Cine Awards Telugu.

== Plot ==
K. Rishi Kumar is announced as the CEO of Origin, a thriving company based in the United States. He brings his mother from India to live with him. To celebrate, his colleague Nidhi organises a party attended by his childhood friend Kanna, whom he has not seen for years, along with his professor Chandrashekar and college friends. The story then flashes back.

Seven years earlier, Rishi lived in a middle-class nuclear family in Hyderabad. His father Satyanarayana, a clerk at a private corporation, had fallen into debt because of his low salary, and Rishi had grown distant from him because of what he saw as his failure. Rishi gained admission to postgraduate studies at IIET, a prestigious university in Vizag, and moved there. He soon became close friends with his roommate Ravi Shankar and their classmate Pooja. Ravi, the son of a poor farmer, was under pressure to earn a well-paid job in the United States. Ajay, another classmate, envied Rishi’s academic success. Pooja introduced Rishi to her large joint family, confessed her love for him, and received a positive response. Rishi topped his first-semester exams and later encouraged Ravi, who had failed, to persevere. When Ravi eventually secured a good job during campus placements, his family and Pallavi were delighted. Meanwhile, Pooja turned down a job at Infosys to join Rishi in the US after his idea for an AI operating system was accepted by Origin.

However, Rishi ended their relationship, fearing that Pooja would become an obstacle to his career. Ravi tried to stop him, and their friendship collapsed. Later, Rishi was accused of stealing question papers, but the allegation was part of a conspiracy by Ajay to stop him from sitting the examinations. The police released him after a clue cleared his name. After finishing his studies, Rishi moved to California and rose through the ranks at Origin. While presenting a project in New York City, he learned that his father had died in his sleep. Returning to India, he realised how deeply his father had loved and missed him, leaving him full of regret.

In the present, Rishi asks Chandrashekar about Ravi and learns that Ravi was expelled after taking the blame for the theft accusation to protect him, which drove Ravi’s father to suicide. Devastated, Rishi takes leave and returns to India with his mother and Kanna, determined to bring Ravi to the USA. He finds Ravi in his village, Ramavaram, leading a solitary protest against a pipeline transport project that will destroy the village and many others. Ravi refuses to leave, even though the village representative, Pallavi’s father, tries to negotiate compensation for the land. Rishi realises Ravi will not move and decides instead to help him save the village.

He approaches the Chief Minister of Andhra Pradesh, who says the project is being handled by the powerful businessman Vivek Mittal. Rishi then meets Vivek and asks him to spare Ramavaram, but is refused. He responds by setting up an office in the village, attracting media attention. Pooja, now a team leader at a leading video gaming company, arrives with a colleague to negotiate a collaboration, and Rishi asks them to stay in Ramavaram and work on her game idea. Though Pooja is reluctant, she remains there. As the protest grows, Ravi’s explanation for defending the village inspires other villagers and soon gathers nationwide support. Pallavi’s father learns of Ravi’s sacrifice and accepts the relationship.

When Vivek arrives, he raises his compensation offer to split the protesters. Ravi is attacked by hired men from a neighbouring village, but Rishi saves him, and Ravi is hospitalised. Vivek then accuses Rishi of using Ravi for personal gain, and Pooja also blames him, breaking his heart. Rishi is ready to leave, but his mother reveals that his father once passed the UPSC examination and was selected for interview, only to be arrested for joining a farmers’ protest. Though it cost him everything, he never regretted it.

Rishi returns to Ramavaram, supports the farmers, and raises the land offer above Vivek’s. At a press conference, he delivers a powerful speech on the exploitation of farmers and the suicides it causes. The villagers refuse the pipeline project, Pooja reconciles with him, and Ajay exposes Vivek’s corruption. The project gets cancelled, and Vivek is arrested by the Enforcement Directorate.

Rishi is due to return to the USA, but he chooses not to. Realising his happiness lies in the village, he resigns as CEO of Origin and turns to agriculture.

== Cast ==
- Mahesh Babu as K. Rishi Kumar
- Allari Naresh as Ravi Shankar, Rishi's best friend
- Pooja Hegde as Pooja, Rishi's love interest
- Jagapathi Babu as Vivek Mittal, a Mumbai-based businessman
- Prakash Raj as K. Satyanarayana, Rishi's father
- Jayasudha as Yashoda, Rishi's mother
- Kamal Kamaraju as S. Ajay Babu, Rishi's rival turned friend, Director of DMG International Bank
- Rao Ramesh as Chandrasekhar, Rishi's professor
- Mukesh Rishi as MP Bhanu Prasad, Ajay's father
- Ananya as Pallavi, Ravi's love interest
- Meenakshi Dixit as Nidhi
- Tanikella Bharani as Shivaan Shankar, Ravi's father
- Sai Kumar as Ramesh, Pallavi's father
- Kaikala Satyanarayana as Trivikram, Pooja's paternal grandfather
- Kota Srinivasa Rao as Kasthuri Ram, Pooja's maternal grandfather
- Nassar as Chief Minister Jaidev Das
- Vennela Kishore as Kanna, Rishi's childhood friend
- Posani Krishna Murali as Murali Krishna, Vivek's supporter
- Srinivasa Reddy as Ramakrishna, Rishi's personal assistant
- Rajiv Kanakala as Farmer
- Brahmaji as Babu, Pooja's manager
- Prudhviraj as Tabloid Journalist
- Anish Kuruvilla as Venkatraman, the college dean
- Ravi Prakash as Police Officer
- Vidyullekha Raman as Sunamwari, Pooja's friend
- Jhansi as TV Host
- Annapoorna as Devi, Pooja's grandmother
- Sameer as Interview Panel Member
- Randhir Gattla as Rahul
- Anand as A. Krishna Kishore, District Collector of Ramavaram
- Shanoor Sana as Minister
- Sivannarayana as Jaikant, Pooja's uncle
- John Kokken as Vivek's personal assistant
- Divi Vadthya as Geetha
- Sravan as Shravan
- Getup Srinu as Ramavaram Villager
- Rupa Lakshmi
- Surya Srinivas as Rishi’s friend
- Mahesh Achanta as Ramavaram Villager
- Guruswamy as Ramavaram Old Farmer

== Production ==
=== Development ===
After successfully producing three films – Munna (2007), Brindavanam (2010) and Yevadu (2014) – Dil Raju announced his fourth collaboration with Vamshi Paidipally in early 2018, under Sri Venkateswara Creations. The film was launched under the tentative title #SSMB25, before the title Maharshi was confirmed on 9 August 2018. Speaking to Hemanth Kumar of Firstpost about the script writing, Vamshi said "One of the toughest parts while writing the script was adding multiple layers to the protagonist's journey. We were quite clear that we weren’t going to tell a story. It had to be like a semi-biopic. We didn’t want to treat the character like a hero right from the beginning. It's about a character who becomes a hero in the end".

=== Filming ===
After the script work was done for a long time, principal photography of the film began in June 2018. A brief first schedule of the filming took place in Hyderabad, Goa and Dehradun. The team next headed to the United States for a two-month long schedule. After a delay in the U.S. schedule, filming in the region was completed by November 2018.

Soon, the team resumed the shoot in Hyderabad at Ramoji Film City, where a fictional village set was constructed. It was reported that the set was constructed at a cost of ₹80 million (equivalent to ₹120 million or US$1.2 million in 2026). The schedule lasted until the third week of December 2018. The team then took a brief break, with Mahesh Babu and his family going to Dubai for a short holiday. Filming was resumed in the second week of January 2019. The schedule took place in Pollachi, Tamil Nadu, and was completed within the same month. The next schedule took place in February 2019. In February Sri Venkateswara Creations announced that the filming would be completed by 15 March 2019, except for two songs. However, the shooting of the film was wrapped up on 18 April 2019.

== Soundtrack ==
The film's soundtrack album and background music were composed by Devi Sri Prasad. All lyrics were written by Sri Mani. The complete soundtrack album was released on 1 May 2019 at the film's pre-release event, where various music artistes performed the songs.

== Release ==
The film was originally scheduled to release on 25 April 2019. On 6 March 2019, Dil Raju announced that the film would be postponed due to delay in the post-production work. The film was released theatrically on 9 May 2019 in India and on 8 May 2019 across 2500 screens in the United States. In Bengaluru, the film was released across 400 screens, thus becoming the first Telugu film to have a high screen count, of the time.

The film was also dubbed and released in 2020 in Tamil as Ungalukkaga Oruvan, in Kannada as Veera Maharshi and in Malayalam. The Hindi dubbed version was directly premiered on Goldmines TV channel on 16 June 2024.

=== Distribution ===
The film's pre-release business, which includes theatrical, overseas, satellite, digital, music and dubbing rights, were sold for ₹1.5 billion (equivalent to ₹1.8 billion or US$19 million in 2026).

Hindi dubbing rights of the film were sold to Goldmines Telefilms for ₹200 million (US$2.1 million). Vintage Creations (East Godavari), Adhitya Films (West Godavari), Phars Film (United Arab Emirates), Sri Venkateswara Creations (Nizam and Uttarandhra), V Movies (Guntur), Rising Star Entertainment (United Kingdom), G3 Movies (Krishna) and Swagath Enterprises (Karnataka).

=== Marketing ===
A 43-second video titled #MeetRishi was released on 9 August 2018, coinciding with Mahesh Babu's birthday. On 10 March 2019, Mahesh Babu shared a few behind-the-scenes pictures on the social media. The official teaser of the film titled #JoinRishi was released on Ugadi, 6 April 2019. To promote the film, a pre-release event was held on 1 May 2019, at People's Plaza, Necklace Road, Hyderabad. The official trailer and complete audio album of the film were released at the event. Various music artistes of the soundtrack album performed songs from the film. Vijay Deverakonda and Venkatesh were the chief guests of the event.

On 16 May 2019, an interactive event titled Maharshulatho Maharshi was held in Hyderabad, in which Paidipally and Babu had an interaction/interview with the farmers. Later, a similar event titled Repati Maharshulatho Maharshi was held, in which both of them interacted with the school students of The Hyderabad Public School. Eight days after the release, an event was held at Vijayawada, Andhra Pradesh, to celebrate the film's success. The event, titled Maharshi Vijayotsavam, was held on 18 May 2019. In June 2019, the event Celebrating Maharshi was held at Shilpakala Vedika, Hyderabad, to celebrate the film's 50 day run in 211 cinemas across India.

=== Home media ===
The satellite rights of the film were purchased by Sun TV Network for ₹250 million (US$2.6 million), and the Telugu version was sold for Gemini TV for ₹165 million (US$1.7 million).

Its fifth-time premiere on the channel registered a TRP rating of 10.28. On an average, the TRP ratings of other premieres are also more than 4.

The film's digital rights were acquired by Amazon Prime Video for ₹110 million (equivalent to ₹150 million or US$1.5 million in 2026), The digital and satellite rights of the Tamil and Kannada dubbed versions of the film were acquired by Star India. The Tamil, Kannada and Malayalam dubbed versions of the film premiered on Star Vijay, Star Suvarna and Zee Keralam respectively, on 18 October 2020.

=== Critical reception ===
Maharshi received mixed reviews from the critics who praised the cast performances, action sequences, technical aspects, plot and emotional quotient while criticising the predictable and lengthy narration. Sangeetha Devi Dundoo of The Hindu wrote, "At the heart of Maharshi is a story that could have been leveraged to make a compelling social drama that also traces the transformative journey of an ambitious man. But there’s a huge gap between what it could have been and what it is". The Times of India's Neeshita Nyayapati gave a rating of 3 out of 5 and wrote that "Watch it not just for Mahesh Babu and Allari Naresh’s performances but also for the story, if you don’t mind all the bells and whistles it comes with. It might not be entertaining all through, thanks to the draggy bits, but its heart is in the right place". Writing for Hindustan Times, Karthik Kumar opined "Maharshi is a problematic film with big ideas but it tugs at heartstrings. Take out the farming sub-plot, Maharshi would’ve been a tiresome watch in which Rishi just won’t shut up with his sermons on success". Sify criticised the film's narration and duration. The reviewer felt that the film has predictable storyline, lacks any shred of originality, the second half is totally unsatisfied and the emotional core is not convincing..

News18 stated "Maharshi exudes a sense of comfort and happiness in the midst of the wreckage and targeting". India Today gave 2.5 out of 5 stars stating "Maharshi has a meaty story in between several sub-plots. If only it was crisp and to the point. If only. Mahesh Babu's Maharshi is not about a business tycoon coming back to his motherland. He has a bigger purpose here". Hemanth Kumar of Firstpost praised cinematography, performances of lead actors and film score, adding: "Maharshi is a well-intentioned drama and has some beautifully written sequences; however, it holds back on a lot of things it wants to say for so long that it makes you feel restless at times". A critic of Deccan Chronicle too praised cinematography, performances of lead actors and film score, giving a rating of three-and-half out of five. Gabbeta Ranjith Kumar of The Indian Express cited the film as "crowd pleaser", giving a final verdict – "Vamshi Paidipally handles an emotionally intense subject well. But, the director could have paid more attention to Maharshi’s run-time. He could have chopped two masala songs which act as speed bumps."

Krishna Sripada of The News Minute gave a rating of 3 out of 5 and opined that the film is "strictly for the fans", writing that "Maharshi has plenty to keep the fans whistling. Naresh's character is well-written, and it is his role that offers the pivotal turning point in the movie. Which makes you wonder why he watches a big chunk of the climax from the sidelines, as if he were there only for emotion-capture, like the relative of a KBC contestant." He further wrote "Prakash Raj, Rao Ramesh and Tanikella Bharani - we have almost lost the art of making our character artists important in giving more and more space to the hero. I mean, come on, even Iron Man concedes space to others. Mahesh does these roles effortlessly and one wonders if there is a pattern behind three successive social-message-based, larger-than-life movies. A change, maybe? One for the actor in him, and not just to please the fans!". Sankeertana Varma of Film Companion opined the same, stating, "Maharshi might just be a delightful movie for a Mahesh Babu fan—after all, it’s mostly him achieving this and that, and running to save people left and right—but for a fan of the movies, it offers nothing."

The Quint also criticised film's weak narration, predictable storyline, while appreciated Vamshi's work and DSP's score composition. About Vamshi's work, the critic wrote "Like Vamshi Paidipalli’s previous film Oopiri, Maharshi oozes with the intense desire to share something of value with the audience. The message that farmers need to be valued. And that youngsters can achieve anything they set their mind to." Murali Krishna CH of The New Indian Express called it "an overlong melodramatic journey," criticising its runtime. "[T]he journey of Mahesh Babu's Rishi is way too long and demands much patience on our part," he added. In contrast, a critic of The Free Press Journal rated the film four out of five, writing "Maharshi exudes a sense of comfort and happiness in the midst of the wreckage and targeting." Business Standard too gave a rating of 4 out of 5, writing "The first-half with its quaint college is heartwarming without trying to be excessively cute. Mahesh Babu's transformative performance from arrogant conceit to conscientious farmer is arguably his best to date."

=== Box office ===
On opening day, the film collected a gross collection of ₹590 million (US$6.1 million) worldwide. In the Telugu-speaking states of India, it collected a gross collection of ₹333 million (US$3.5 million) and a distributors' share collection of ₹246 million (US$2.6 million). In its second day of release, the film earned a distributors' share of ₹325.7 million (US$3.4 million) in Andhra Pradesh and Telangana.

In the first extended weekend (Thursday release), the film entered the ₹1 Billion Club. By the end of its first weekend, the film had earned a distributors' share collection of ₹34.5 million (US$360,000) in Bengaluru. By the sixth day of its release, it had collected a gross of $1,500,000 in the United States, making it the sixth film to cross the mark in Babu's career. In seven days, it grossed over ₹80 million (US$830,000) at the United Arab Emirates box office. In 11 days, the film collected ₹727.9 million (US$7.6 million) in Telugu-speaking states (Andhra Pradesh and Telangana). By the end of its theatrical run, the film had grossed ₹2 billion (US$21 million) worldwide, while in the international market the film earned a gross collection of ₹250 million (US$2.6 million).

== Accolades ==
Award (Note: Awards, festivals and organisations are in alphabetical order.)	Date of ceremony (Note: Date is linked to the article about the awards held that year, wherever possible.)	Category	Recipient(s)	Result	Ref.
National Film Awards	25 October 2021	Best Popular Film Providing Wholesome Entertainment	Producer: Sri Venkateswara Creations; Director: Vamshi Paidipally	Won	
National Film Awards	25 October 2021	Best Choreography	Raju Sundaram – (for "Everest Anchuna")	Won	
Sakshi Excellence Awards	17 September 2021	Most Popular Actor of the Year	Mahesh Babu	Won	
Sakshi Excellence Awards	17 September 2021	Most Popular Movie of the Year	Maharshi	Won	
Sakshi Excellence Awards	17 September 2021	Director – Most Inspiring Movie	Vamshi Paidipally	Won	
Santosham Film Awards	14 November 2021	Best Supporting Actor	Allari Naresh	Won	
Santosham Film Awards	14 November 2021	Best Film	Dil Raju, C. Ashwini Dutt and Prasad V. Potluri	Won	
Santosham Film Awards	14 November 2021	Best Female Playback Singer	Vishnupriya Ravi for "Everest Anchuna"	Won	
South Indian International Movie Awards	18 September 2021	Best Film – Telugu	PVP Cinema, Vyjayanthi Movies, Sri Venkateswara Creations	Nominated	
South Indian International Movie Awards	18 September 2021	Best Director – Telugu	Vamshi Paidipally	Won	
South Indian International Movie Awards	18 September 2021	Best Actor – Telugu	Mahesh Babu	Won	
South Indian International Movie Awards	18 September 2021	Best Actress – Telugu	Pooja Hegde	Nominated	
South Indian International Movie Awards	18 September 2021	Best Supporting Actor – Telugu	Allari Naresh	Won	
South Indian International Movie Awards	18 September 2021	Best Actor in a Negative Role – Telugu	Jagapathi Babu	Nominated	
South Indian International Movie Awards	18 September 2021	Best Music Director – Telugu	Devi Sri Prasad	Won	
South Indian International Movie Awards	18 September 2021	Best Lyricist – Telugu	Sri Mani – (for "Idhe Kadha Nee Katha")	Won	
South Indian International Movie Awards	18 September 2021	Best Male Playback Singer – Telugu	Shankar Mahadevan – (for "Padara Padara")	Nominated	
South Indian International Movie Awards	18 September 2021	Best Cinematographer – Telugu	K. U. Mohanan	Nominated	
Zee Cine Awards Telugu	11 January 2020	Favorite Actor	Mahesh Babu	Nominated	
Zee Cine Awards Telugu	11 January 2020	Best Actor – Male	Mahesh Babu	Nominated	
Zee Cine Awards Telugu	11 January 2020	Best Actor in Supporting Role	Allari Naresh	Won	
Zee Cine Awards Telugu	11 January 2020	Favourite Actress	Pooja Hegde	Won	
