= Shriya Saran filmography =

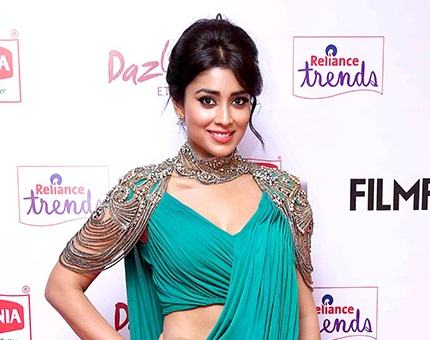
Shriya Saran at 62nd South Filmfare awards.

Shriya Saran is an Indian actress and model who has appeared mostly in Telugu, Tamil and Hindi language films. She made her acting debut with the Telugu film Ishtam (2001) and had her first commercial success with Santosham (2002). The following year, she made her Hindi cinema debut with a supporting role in Tujhe Meri Kasam, alongside Riteish Deshmukh and Genelia D'Souza, which is a remake of Malayalam film Niram. It was followed by the commercially successful crime drama Tagore (2003), in which she was paired opposite Chiranjeevi, which is a remake of Tamil film Ramanaa. The same year, she played a supporting role in the Tamil-Telugu bilingual film Enakku 20 Unakku 18, which marked her debut in Tamil cinema. In 2005, she had ten releases including Mazhai, S. S. Rajamouli's Chatrapathi, and Mogudu Pellam O Dongodu, in which she was among the only three characters of the film. Saran's solitary release as a lead actress in 2006 was the Tamil film Thiruvilaiyaadal Aarambam.

In 2007, Saran was paired opposite Rajinikanth in S. Shankar's Sivaji. It was the most expensive film in Indian cinema and went on to become the highest grossing Tamil film to that point. The same year, she made a comeback to Hindi cinema with Mohit Suri's Awarapan, where she played a Muslim woman. Following that, she made her American cinema debut with James Dodson's The Other End of the Line (2008), in which she played an Indian woman who works in a call centre. Her subsequent releases include the Tamil films Kanthaswamy (2009) and Kutty (2010), and Pokkiri Raja (2010), which marked her debut in Malayalam cinema.

In 2012, Saran starred in Deepa Mehta's Midnight's Children, an English adaptation of Salman Rushdie's novel of the same name. The following years, she played a princess in Roopa Iyer's period fantasy drama Chandra; the film was shot simultaneously in Kannada and Tamil. In 2014, she played dual roles in the Telugu drama film Manam. Saran received critical acclaim for her performance and was nominated for the Best Supporting Actress – Telugu Award at the 62nd Filmfare Awards South. The following year, she appeared opposite Ajay Devgn in Drishyam, the Hindi remake of the Malayalam film of the same name, which became a box office success.

== Film ==
Key
†	Denotes films that have not yet been released

Year	Title	Role(s)	Language	Notes	Ref.
2001	Ishtam	Neha	Telugu		
2002	Santosham	Bhanu	Telugu	Nominated — Filmfare Award for Best Actress – Telugu	
2002	Chennakesava Reddy	Preethi	Telugu		
2002	Nuvve Nuvve	Anjali	Telugu		
2003	Tujhe Meri Kasam	Girija	Hindi		
2003	Neeku Nenu Naaku Nuvvu	Sitalakshmi	Telugu		
2003	Tagore	Devaki	Telugu		
2003	Ela Cheppanu	Priya	Telugu		
2003	Enakku 20 Unakku 18	Reshma	Tamil	credited as Shriya, Bilingual film	
2003	Nee Manasu Naaku Telusu	Reshma	Telugu	credited as Shriya, Bilingual film	
2004	Nenunnanu	Anu	Telugu	Nominated—Filmfare Award for Best Actress – Telugu	
2004	Thoda Tum Badlo Thoda Hum	Rani	Hindi		
2004	Arjun	Roopa	Telugu		
2004	Shukriya: Till Death Do Us Apart	Sanam K. Jindal	Hindi		
2005	Balu	Swetha	Telugu		
2005	Naa Alludu	Meghana	Telugu	credited as Shriya	
2005	Sada Mee Sevalo	Suryakantham	Telugu		
2005	Soggadu	Herself	Telugu	Special appearance	
2005	Subash Chandra Bose	Swarajyam	Telugu		
2005	Mogudu Pellam O Dongodu	Satyabhama	Telugu		
2005	Mazhai	Shailaja	Tamil		
2005	Chatrapathi	Neelu	Telugu	Nominated—Filmfare Award for Best Actress – Telugu	
2005	Bhageeratha	Mahalakshmi / Swetha / Sonali	Telugu		
2005	Bommalata	Swathi	Telugu	Cameo appearance	
2006	Devadasu	Herself	Telugu	Special appearance	
2006	Game	Vijay Raj's girlfriend	Telugu	Special appearance	
2006	Boss	Sanjana	Telugu	Special appearance	
2006	Thiruvilaiyaadal Aarambam	Priya	Tamil		
2007	Munna	Herself	Telugu	Special appearance in the song "Chammakkuro"	
2007	Arasu	Arpitha	Kannada	Cameo appearance	
2007	Sivaji: The Boss	Thamizhselvi	Tamil		
2007	Awarapan	Aliya	Hindi		
2007	Tulasi	Herself	Telugu	Special appearance in the song "Ne Chuk Chuk Bandini"	
2007	Azhagiya Tamil Magan	Abhinaya	Tamil		
2008	Indiralohathil Na Azhagappan	Herself	Tamil	Special appearance in the song "Mallika Sherawata? Marilyn Monroe va?"	
2008	Mission Istaanbul	Anjali Sagar	Hindi		
2008	The Other End of the Line	Priya Sethi	English		
2009	Ek: The Power of One	Preet Kaur	Hindi		
2009	Thoranai	Indhu	Tamil		
2009	Pistha	Indhu	Telugu		
2009	Kanthaswamy	Subbulakshmi	Tamil		
2009	Cooking with Stella	Tannu	English		
2010	Kutty	Geethanjali	Tamil		
2010	Jaggubhai	Monisha Jagannathan	Tamil		
2010	Na Ghar Ke Na Ghaat Ke	Herself	Hindi	Special appearance	
2010	Pokkiri Raja	Aswathy	Malayalam		
2010	Don Seenu	Deepti	Telugu		
2010	Puli	Herself	Telugu	Special appearance in the song "Dochey"	
2010	Uthamaputhiran	Kalpana	Tamil	Guest appearance	
2010	Chikku Bukku	Anu Ammaiyappan	Tamil		
2011	Rowthiram	Priya	Tamil		
2011	Rajapattai	Herself	Tamil	Special appearance in the song "Laddu Laddu Rendu Laddu"	
2012	Casanovva	Sameera Zacharia	Malayalam		
2012	Gali Gali Chor Hai	Nisha Pandit	Hindi		
2012	Nuvva Nena	Dr. Nandini	Telugu		
2012	Life is Beautiful	Parvati	Telugu		
2012	Midnight's Children	Parvati	English		
2013	Zila Ghaziabad	Herself	Hindi	Special appearance in the song "Chamiya No.1"	
2013	Pavitra	Pavitra	Telugu		
2013	Chandra	Ammanmani Chandravathy	Kannada		
2014	Chandra	Ammanmani Chandravathy	Tamil		
2014	Manam	Rama Lakshmi, Anjali	Telugu	Nominated —Filmfare Award for Best Supporting Actress - Telugu	
2015	Gopala Gopala	Meenakshi	Telugu		
2015	Drishyam	Nandini Salgaonkar	Hindi		
2016	Oopiri	Priya	Telugu	Cameo appearance	
2016	Oopiri	Priya	Tamil	Cameo appearance	
2017	Gautamiputra Satakarni	Vashishtha Devi	Telugu		
2017	Anbanavan Asaradhavan Adangadhavan	Selvi	Tamil		
2017	Nakshathram	Herself	Telugu	Special appearance in the song "Time Ledu Guru"	
2017	Paisa Vasool	Sarika	Telugu		
2018	Gayatri	Sharada	Telugu		
2018	Phamous	Lalli	Hindi		
2018	Veera Bhoga Vasantha Rayalu	Neelima	Telugu		
2019	NTR: Kathanayakudu	Prabha	Telugu	Special appearance in the song "Chitram Bhale Vichitram"	
2020	Sab Kushal Mangal	Herself	Hindi	Special appearance in the song "Naya Naya Love"	
2021	Gamanam	Kamala	Telugu		
2022	RRR	Alluri Sarojini	Telugu		
2022	Tadka	Madhura	Hindi		
2022	Drishyam 2	Nandini Salgaonkar	Hindi		
2023	Kabzaa	Madhumathi Bahaddur	Kannada		
2023	Music School	Maria D'Cruz	Hindi	Bilingual film	
2023	Music School	Maria D'Cruz	Telugu	Bilingual film	
2025	Retro	Blue Thorn	Tamil	Special appearance in the song "Love Detox"	
2025	Mirai	Ambika Prajapati	Telugu		
2026	Awarapan 2	Aaliyah Hamid	Hindi	Special appearance	
2026	Sandakari	Maya Azhagan	Tamil		
2026	Drishyam: The Conclusion	Nandini Salgaonkar	Hindi		
2026	Non Violence †	Kanaga	Tamil	Special appearance in the song "Kanaga"	

== Television ==
Year	Title	Role	Language	Notes	Ref.
2024	Showtime	Mandira Singh	Hindi		
2026	Space Gen: Chandrayaan	Yamini Mudaliar	Hindi		

== Music videos ==
Year	Song	Language	Ref
2001	"Thirakti Kyun Hawa"	Hindi	
2003	"Kahin Door"	Hindi	
2018	"Rang De Chunariya"	Hindi	
2020	"Bhari Bhari Song"	Hindi	
2025	"Aayiye Ram Ji"	Hindi	
