= Thiruchitrambalam =

2022 film by Mithran R Jawahar

- Theatrical release poster
- Directed by: Mithran R. Jawahar
- Written by: Dhanush
- Produced by: Kalanithi Maran
- Starring: Dhanush; Nithya Menen; Bharathiraja; Prakash Raj; Raashii Khanna; Priya Bhavani Shankar
- Cinematography: Om Prakash
- Edited by: Prasanna GK
- Music by: Anirudh Ravichander
- Production company: Sun Pictures
- Distributed by: Red Giant Movies
- Release date: 18 August 2022
- Running time: 133 minutes
- Country: India
- Language: Tamil
- Box office: est. ₹115 crore

Thiruchitrambalam is a 2022 Indian Tamil-language romantic comedy drama film written by Dhanush and directed by Mithran R. Jawahar and produced by Sun Pictures. The film stars Dhanush in the title role with Nithya Menen, Bharathiraja, Prakash Raj, Raashii Khanna and Priya Bhavani Shankar in pivotal roles. In the film, Thiruchitrambalam is a deliveryman who lives with his father and grandfather; he blames his father for the loss of his mother and sister and is not on good terms with him. Meanwhile, his love life is not so successful.

The film was officially announced in December 2019 under the tentative title D44, as it is Dhanush's 44th film as the lead actor, while the official title was announced in August 2021. Principal photography commenced the same month, predominantly shot in Chennai and Pondicherry, and wrapped in early-October 2021. The film has music composed by Anirudh Ravichander, cinematography handled by Om Prakash and editing by Prasanna GK.

Thiruchitrambalam was released in theatres on 18 August 2022. The film received positive reviews from critics and grossed over ₹100 crore worldwide, becoming one of the highest-grossing Tamil films of 2022. It won two awards at the 70th National Film Awards: Best Actress (Menen) and Best Choreography (Sathish Krishnan).

== Plot ==
Thiruchitrambalam alias "Pazham" (literally fruit in Tamil) is a food delivery agent who lives with his strict father Inspector Neelakandan and paternal grandfather whose name is also Thiruchitrambalam. His mother and sister died in an accident because of his father's negligence. Unable to forgive his father, Pazham avoids talking to him even though they live under the same roof. His only comfort is his childhood friend Shobana, whom he opens up to. As Pazham navigates through his life, he ends up falling for his childhood crush, Anusha. As an immature man, he seeks help from Shobana, and she gives him ideas to propose his love to Anusha.

One day, over lunch, Pazham confesses his feelings to Anusha, but she rejects and apologises to him for flirting and leading him to think that she has a romantic interest in him. Meanwhile, Pazham reconciles with Neelakandan after the latter suffers a stroke, which occurred after a fight between both regarding their dead family members. They leave for his mother's village for a wedding along with Shobhana. Pazham meets Ranjani at the wedding and falls for her. Pazham again seeks help from Shobana. Shobhana arranges a meet-up between them, minutes before they leave for Chennai. Pazham asks Ranjini for her phone number, but she scoffs at his request, saying they are both strangers and have no reason to be in contact, which leaves Pazham embarrassed. On his way back home, Pazham laments his bad luck in finding love with his grandfather Sr. Thiruchitrambalam, who asks Pazham to rethink his relationship with Shobana, which makes Pazham hesitant.

Pazham, who saw Shobana as his friend until then, starts developing a romantic interest in her. Pazham confesses his feelings to Shobana, but Shobhana rejects him. This causes awkwardness and strain in their relationship, and they both stop talking to each other for a while. Shobana decides to leave for Canada for work and tells Pazham to meet her at the airport. On his way to the airport, Pazham's vehicle is stopped by the police, and Shobana gets on the flight. Pazham regrets spoiling his relationship with Shobana, only to learn later through Shobana's brother that she has been in love with Pazham all along, who has been ignoring her feelings for years since the sixth grade and that she has treasured letters and gifts from him over the years. He further tells Pazham that she rejected him because she does not want to be in a rebound relationship. Since Pazham asked all his doubts on love and proposals many times, Shobana stopped thinking about him.

One month passes by, and Pazham calls Shobana, where she tells him that she hates Canada and wants to return to India. In a twist of events, Pazham tells her to turn around, and she is shocked to see him there. Pazham apologises for ignoring her feelings and being selfish for not asking about her feelings all these years, and Pazham rekindles their relationship. They return to India and finally get married.

== Cast ==
- Dhanush as Thiruchitrambalam Jr. ("Pazham")
- Nithya Menen as Shobana
- Prakash Raj as Inspector Neelakandan
- Bharathiraja as Sr. Thiruchitrambalam
- Raashii Khanna as Anusha (Voice dubbed by Smruthi K)
- Priya Bhavani Shankar as Ranjani
- Munishkanth as Subbaraj
- Sriranjani as Rajeshwari
- Stunt Silva as Dass, a child kidnapper
- Aranthangi Nisha as Dhanalakshmi
- V J Pappu as Krishna
- Vikram Raja as Anusha's boyfriend
- A. Revathy as Shenbagam
- Mu Ramaswamy as Pazham's maternal grandfather
- Revathi as Valli, Pazham's mother and Neelakandan's wife (cameo appearance)
- Mithran R. Jawahar as a traffic police officer (cameo appearance)

== Production ==
=== Development ===
On 15 December 2019, Kalanithi Maran, owner of the production house Sun Pictures, announced that the house was joining hands with Dhanush for his 44th film as the lead actor. A few days before, Anirudh Ravichander stated that he would collaborate soon with the latter, making speculations whether it is this project or another. In January 2020, director Mithran R. Jawahar, who had successful collaborations with Dhanush after Yaaradi Nee Mohini (2008), Kutty and Uthamaputhiran (2010), was reportedly chosen to direct the venture. Dhanush was reported to have written the script and chosen Jawahar to direct it.

In early October that year, reports claimed that production for the project would start after Dhanush completes his commitments to his venture with Mari Selvaraj, which became Karnan (2021). Coinciding with the occasion of Anirudh's birthday, he was announced to compose the score, in his reunion with Dhanush after years. Cinematographer Om Prakash, editor Prasanna GK, art director Jacki, stunt choreographer Stunt Silva, dance choreographers Jani Master – Sathish Krishnan and costume designer Kavya Sriram were a part of the technical crew. On 5 August 2021, the official title Thiruchitrambalam was announced.

=== Casting ===
Nithya Menen got 2-3 offers to act with Dhanush before Thiruchitrambalam including for Aadukalam but she could not do that for other reasons. Dhanush also planned to direct a film in 2018 which would have Menen collaborating with him, but again that project did not materialise. While writing the script for Thiruchtrambalam, Dhanush had Menen in mind for the lead role. Finally, in 2020 she was confirmed as the main female lead as Dhanush's friend character Shobhana. Later Raashii Khanna and Priya Bhavani Shankar was announced to play supporting roles along with Prakash Raj and Bharathiraja.

=== Filming ===
Principal photography began with a pooja ceremony in Chennai on 5 August 2021. On 10 August, Prakash Raj took a short break for surgery after he fractured his shoulder during the shooting. Raashii Khanna joined the film's sets in Chennai on 25 August. The crew went to film the song sequences in Pondicherry after the Chennai schedule being completed. In late-August, stills from the film, featuring Dhanush and Khanna, were leaked and went viral on internet. In September, a song shoot featuring Dhanush and Menen was choreographed by Jani Master and filmed in the outskirts of Pondicherry. Stills from the song shoot were leaked onto the internet. The film's shooting, which took place for 50 days, has been completed in early-October 2021. On 14 February 2022, it was announced that dubbing for the film has begun. The film was shot in the 1.85:1 aspect ratio.

== Music ==
The songs and original score are composed by Anirudh Ravichander, reuniting with Dhanush after six years since their last film, Thanga Magan (2015). It marks Anirudh's fifth collaboration with Dhanush and his first with Mithran Jawahar.

== Release ==
=== Theatrical ===
Thiruchitrambalam was released worldwide theatrically on 18 August 2022. It is Dhanush's first theatrical release since Karnan (2021) as Jagame Thandhiram (2021), Atrangi Re (2021), Maaran (2022) and The Gray Man (2022) were assigned direct-to-streaming releases.

=== Home media ===
The satellite rights were sold to Sun TV and the streaming rights were bought by Sun NXT. The film began streaming on Sun NXT from 23 September 2022. The film premiered on Sun TV on 15 January 2023 on the occasion of Pongal, and on 6 October 2023, streaming in all five languages started on Amazon Prime Video.

== Reception ==
=== Box office ===
On the first day of its release, the film earned over ₹9 crore on its opening day, and grossed over ₹6 crore in Tamil Nadu. On the second day of its release the film crossed over ₹20 crores at the box office. On the third day of its release, the film has collected over ₹32.97 crore in its box office. On its opening weekend, the film grossed over ₹50 crore. On the tenth day of its release, the film grossed over ₹64.72 crores in Tamil Nadu. On the thirteenth day of its release the film crossed the 100 crore mark worldwide and became one of the highest-grossing Tamil films of the year.

=== Critical response ===
Thiruchitrambalam received positive reviews from critics. On the review aggregator website Rotten Tomatoes, 100% of 8 critics' reviews are positive, with an average rating of 7.7/10.

Haricharan Pudipeddi of Hindustan Times called Thiruchitrambalam a "simple film with its heart at the right place", going on to add that the "simplistic storytelling along with the highly-relatable characters make the film endearing and wholesome", while praising Nithya Menen as "phenomenal". Krishna Selvaseelan of Tamil Guardian gave the film 3/5 stars, stating, “The film has a lot going for it. Jawahar has matured drastically in his technical sensibilities.” Kirubhakar Purushothaman of The Indian Express gave the film 4/5 stars, stating that "Thiruchitramabalam treats you to an extreme close-up of everyday people and their everyday problems. It is also a gentle reminder that you don't need a lot of guns to blow the audiences' minds." Srivatsan S of The Hindu stated after reviewing the film that "Thiruchitrabalam is also that rom-com where you almost get an airport climax." Janani K of India Today gave 3.5/5 stars and wrote that "Thiruchitrambalam is a fun entertainer that makes you enjoy the everyday things that we usually miss out on."

M Suganth of The Times of India gave the film's rating 3.5/5 and stated that "Even the airport climax gets a modern spin that makes it agreeable. But the detour to the protagonist's village doesn't really lend anything extra to the story. We get a few more characters who are also nice people, and that's just it. But the film's director Mithras Jawahar makes up for it with the heartwarming climax." Ranjini Krishnakumar of News9Live gave 3.5/5 stars, stating that "This endearment for Pazham that the film evokes is not entirely written in. A good part of it is, in fact, Dhanush, who moves us with his boy-next-door charm." Sowmya Rajendran of The News Minute gave 4/5 stars, stating that "What a relief to see such a simple, well-told story in Tamil cinema after so long! Nourishing and no fuss, just like a pazham." Sudhir Srinivasan of Cinema Express gave the film 3/5 stars and stated that "It's tragic really when a film, on the cusp of excellence, makes a dated choice that ends up leaving a sour aftertaste."

Soundarya Athimuthu of The Quint gave the film 4.5/5 stars, stating that "With impactful dialogues, the film eases out the unnecessary guilt that senior citizens and people with disabilities usually feel and treats them with dignity." Outlook rated the film 3.5/5 stars and stated that "In all, 'Thiruchitrambalam' is an entertainer and a full-fledged one at that!" Karthik Kelamalu of Firstpost gave the film 3.5/5 stars and stated that "For a director who's mostly made remakes (Yaaradi Nee Mohini, 2008; Uthamaputhiran, 2010), the richness of Thiruchitrambalam will surely yield fresh fruits". Suhasini Srihari of Deccan Herald gave the film's 4/5 rating and stated that "'Thiruchitrambalam' is a narrative that comes afresh with newer ways of telling an old story. Ananda Vikatan rated the film 44 out of 100.

== Accolades ==
At the 70th National Film Awards, Nithya Menen won the award for Best Actress in a Leading Role, and Sathish Krishnan won for Best Choreography. Jani Master was initially announced as sharing the award with him, but the committee retracted his award under the Protection of Children from Sexual Offences Act due to allegations made against him, leaving Sathish Krishnan the sole recipient.
