= Mukhaputa =

- ಮುಖಪುಟ
- Directed by: Roopa Iyer
- Screenplay by: Roopa Iyer
- Story by: Roopa Iyer
- Produced by: Narayan Hosmane; Subraya Hosmane; Roopa Iyer
- Starring: Sanya Iyer; Roopa Iyer
- Cinematography: S. Ramachandra
- Edited by: P. Haridas
- Music by: Hamsalekha
- Production company: India Classic Arts
- Release dates: September 2009 (Irish Film Festival); 19 February 2010
- Running time: 112 minutes
- Country: India
- Language: Kannada
- Box office: ₹10 million

Mukhaputa (transl. The Cover Page) is a 2009 Indian Kannada-language film written, directed by and starring Roopa Iyer. The film has international HIV/AIDS researchers and academics as advisors: Dr. Satish, President of HIV Research Association of India, and Prof. Narayan Hosmane, two times Humboldt Award winner of Northern Illinois University, to help authenticate the symptoms, diagnosis, and treatment and to dispel the misconceived notions of the terminal disease. The movie, which is produced by Narayan Hosmane, a cancer specialist in the US, his brother, Subraya Hosmane, an industrialist in Mumbai, and Roopa, also stars Sanya Iyer, Ananda Theertha, Sumithra, Chi. Gurudutt, and Badri Prasad in leading roles. Composer Hamsalekha, who has scored music for the film, too makes a special appearance in the film. An award-winning cinematographer, S. Ramachandra, is the director behind camera, and Haridas is the film editor of the movie, Shooting schedules, Marketing, Distribution prepared by Media Networks G.

== Plot ==
The film is about the children suffering from HIV/AIDS. The film is set in a small town in South India, where a socially responsible educationally oriented traditional woman adopts a young baby girl, and realizes after several years that the child had HIV at birth. The story centered on the child, and a few of her underprivileged friends of the same age, depicts the challenges faced by the girl, her family and the society – it showcases pre-conceived notions that society infers on patients with HIV, and how children and their family are coping up with life. With very positive messages, the film reinforces the strength needed to "grow against all odds" – the message is applicable to all around the world that are struggling to grow in a biased society for no fault of theirs’

== Cast ==
- Sanya Iyer as Bhavathi
- Roopa Iyer as Gowri
- Ananda Theertha
- Sumithra
- Chi. Guru Dutt
- Badri Prasad
- Narayan Hosmane
- Hamsalekha in a cameo appearance

== Reception ==
=== Critical response ===
BSS from Deccan Herald wrote "First-time director Roopa Iyer weaves a fine, yet robust yarn in the colours of culture, humanity and compassion. Her approach is direct: the supporting characters are forced to look at themselves in their roles as upholders of norms and tradition. Highlighting Hindu culture, Roopa brings in the Vedas, Upanishads and the like dissecting the Hindu way of life effortlessly. However, the film embraces words in place of silence, undoing all the good work" A critic from Bangalore Mirror wrote "The film has a few touching scenes. But due to the preachy nature of Roopa Iyer’s character and the more-than-necessary focus on her alone, the film loses some of its serious tone.Sania Iyer as the HIV infected child touches a raw nerve. Hamsalekha’s music and S Ramachandra’s camera work are okay but not remarkable".

== Awards ==
Award / Film Festival	Category	Recipient	Result	Reference
Irish Film Festival	Best Feature Film	Roopa Iyer	Won	
Yosemite International Film Festival	Silver Sierra Best Feature Film	Roopa Iyer	Won	
Karnataka State Film Awards	Special Film of Social Concern	Roopa Iyer	Won	
