= Neera Arya =

Officer in the Indian National Army (1902–1998)

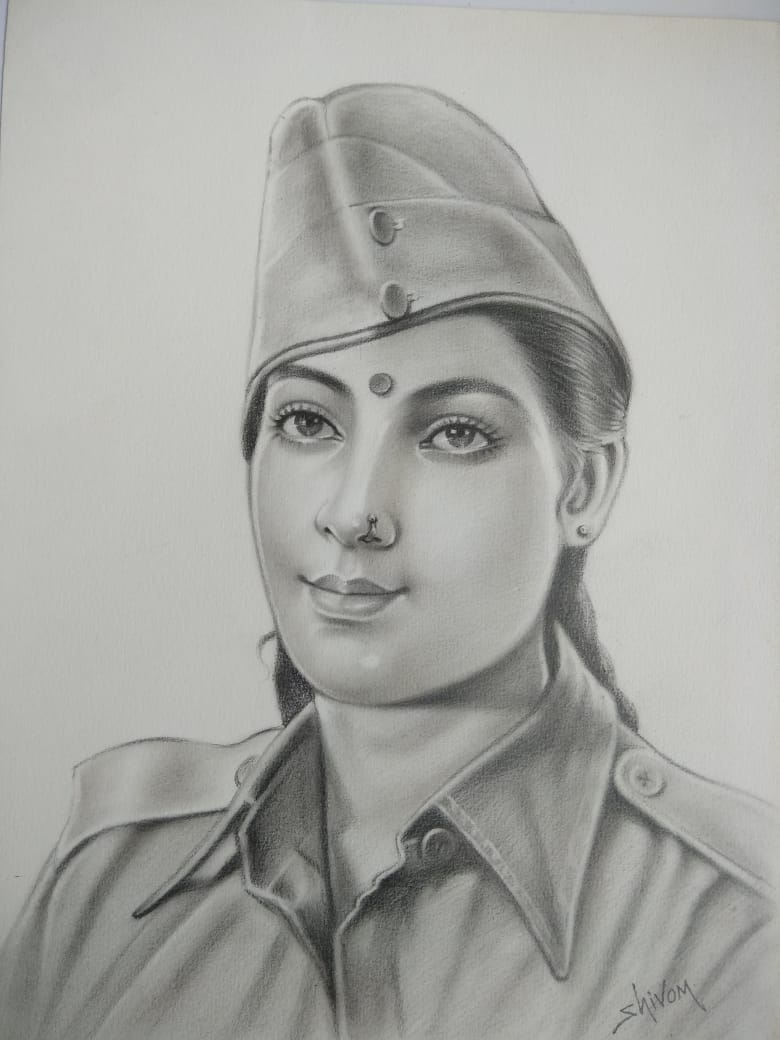
- Neera Arya in 1942
- Born: March 5, 1902; Khekada, Bagpat Uttar Pradesh
- Died: July 26, 1998 (aged 96); Hyderabad
- Resting place: Hyderabad, Telangana
- Monuments: Neera Arya Statue (Hyderabad) Cellular Jail (Andaman & Nicobar)
- Other names: Neera Nagini; Peddamma (Elder Mother)
- Occupation: Freedom fighter
- Years active: 1942-1945
- Known for: Killing her Husband
- Notable work: Mera jeevan, Mera Sangharsh
- Movement: Azad Hind and Indian Independence Movement
- Criminal charges: Murder of British CID Officer Shrikant Jairanjan Das; Sedition and Espionage
- Criminal penalty: Life Imprisonment in Cellular Jail in Andaman & Nicobar
- Spouse: Shrikant Jairanjan Das
- Parent(s): Biological: Mahavir Singh (father) and Lakshmi Devi (mother), Adoptive Father: Chhaju Ram Lamba; Adoptive Mother: Laxmi Devi

Neera Arya (March 5 1902 – July 26 1998), often dubbed the Veerangana (brave woman), is recognised as the first woman spy of the Indian National Army (INA), led by Netaji Subhas Chandra Bose.

== Early life and family ==
Neera arya was born on March 5, 1902 in the village of Khekada in the Bagpat district of Uttar Pradesh. when Neera was eight years old, her parents passed away. At that time, Seth Chhaju Ram Lamba (a native of Bhiwani, Haryana, and a prominent merchant in Kolkata) had arrived in Bagpat-Meerut to attend an Arya Samaj conference.Taking upon himself the responsibility for their upbringing and education, he adpoted the children- Neera Arya and her brother, Basant Kumar.

Following her adoption, Neera Arya moved to Kolkata with her father. Neera received her early education in Bhagwanpur village, near Kolkata. Her first teacher there was Bani Gosh, who imparted to her a knowledge of Sanskrit. After completing her primary education, she pursued her further studies at a prestigious school in the city of Kolkata. During the course of her education and travels, she became proficient in several languages, including Hindi, English, and Bengali. Following in their father's footsteps, both these children also became Arya Samajist.

Once Bhagat Singh and his associate, Sushila Didi, stayed at their home for a month, their presence ignited a deep sense of patriotism in the hearts of both children. Once while studying in Kolkata, Neera Arya and her brother went for a stroll along the seashore; suddenly, while bathing in the sea, Neera began to drown At that moment a young man saved Neera's life, and introduced himself as subhash Chandra Bose. After saving her life, Netaji inquired about Neera's father and advised her not to swim alone.This is how Neera met Subhash Chandra Bose for the very first time.

Neera's official meeting with Netaji is said to have taken place around 1942 in Rangoon, Myanmar, during the secret meetings of the Indian National Army.

== Marriage life ==
Since Neera's father, Seth Chaudhary Chhaju Ram Lamba, was a prominent businessman, he sought out a wealthy and well-educated young man for his daughter; consequently, on December 24,1928, he arranged Neera's marriage to a British police officer, Shrikant Jairanjan Das, with great pomp and grandeur.

Although, Chhaju Ram Lamba knew that Shrikant was a police officer, he did not know that Shrikant worked for the British Police's intelligence agency.

Neera possessed a revolutionary mindset; since she and her husband could not get along, Immediately Neera Arya left her husband and in-laws house and came to her father Seth Chaudhary Chhajuram's house. After that Neera Arya left Calcutta and came to her father like Acharya Chatursen in Shahdara, Delhi.

== Indian National Army ==
While she was teaching children in Shahdara, she met an acquaintance named Ram Singh. When Ram Singh mentioned his plans to go to Singapore and join the Azad Hind Fauj (Indian National Army), Neera expressed her own desire to enlist in the Army as well. Neera traveled to singapore with her brother, Basant Kumar and joined the Azad Hind Fauj. On 22 October 1943, the Rani of Jhansi Regiment was formally announced by Netaji Subhash Chandra Bose. Neera received military training under the supervision and leadership of Lakshmi Sahgal. She successfully carried out espionage within the British military camp and office.

Once Neera successfully managed to help one of her comrades, Durga Malla, escape from prison, She was appointed Captain of the Rani of Jhansi Regiment, and her friend was made a Lieutenent.

The British police entrusted Shrikant with the task of capturing Netaji. When Shrikant fired at Netaji, the bullet struck his driver; witnessing this, Neera-attacked shrikant with a knife, resulting in his death. Following this incident Netaji bestowed upon Neera the title of Neera Nagini.

Following the surrender of the Japanese Army the Azad Hind Fauj( INA) was also compelled to surrender leading to the capture and imprisonment of its soldiers by the British. Neera Arya was subsequently arrested and faced a trial at Red Fort on Delhi on charges of murder, espionage and Treason.While many soldiers were eventually released due to widespread public pressure, Neera was convicted specially for the murder of her husband, Shrikant Jairanjan Das, a British CID inspector. As a result, she was sentenced to life imprisonment in the notorious Cellular Jail (Kala Pani).

== Incarceration and torture ==
Following her conviction for the murder of a British CID inspector, Neera Arya was sentenced to life imprisonment. she was deported to the notorious Cellular Jail in the Andaman and Nicobar Island, commonly known as "Kala Pani". As a political prisoner of the Azad Hind Fauj she was subjected to rigorous imprisonment and solitary confinement. Historical accounts and her memories detail the extreme physical torture she endured at the hands of British jailers.

She was repeatedly interrogated to extract information regarding the whereabouts of Netaji Subhash Chandra Bose. In a documented act of brutality, a British official ordered the blacksmith to forcibly remove her shackles, causing severe injury. It is widely reported that during her refusal to betray the INA, she suffered a horrific physical assault involving a Breast ripper tool.

Along with other inmates, she was forced to perform grueling manual labor, including extracting oil from coconuts using a heavy Kohlu. She remained incarcerated until India gained independence in 1947, after which she was released and eventually settled in Hyderabad.

== Life after release and later years ==
After her release from the Cellular Jail following India's independence, Neera Arya moved to Hyderabad, where she spent the remainder of her life living as a common citizen. Despite her heroic past as a veteran of the Azad Hind Fauj, she lived in extreme poverty and earned a meager living by selling flowers on the streets near the Charminar.

Driven by a strong sense of self respect and patriotism she reportedly refused to accept a freedom fighter's pension or any financial assistance from the government choosing to live independently. In her final years she faced further hardship when her small hut was demolished by local authorities during an encroachment drive leaving the aging revolutionary homeless.

Neera Arya passed away on July 26, 1998, at Osmania Hospital in Hyderabad; she died in near total obscurity and poverty, only gaining widespread national recognition years after her death.

== Legacy ==
Bust of Arya with commemorative plaques, Neera Arya Memorial and Library, Khekra

The Neera Arya Memorial and Library is in Khekra, Baghpat district, Uttar Pradesh, where Arya was born.

A biopic titled Azad Bharat, directed by Roopa Iyer who plays the part of Arya, was released in 2026.

== Books ==
- First Lady Spy of INA: Neera Arya (2023) by Madhu Dhama. (ISBN 978-9354886621)
- Mera Jeevan Mera Sangharsh (1968) by Neera Arya (Autobiography). (ISBN 9789390594832)
- Neera Arya Ek Veerangna: Ek Bhadur Naari ki Sachchi Kahani (2021) by sonia Moriya.(ISBN 978-1685237615)
- The Serpent and the Patriot: The Unbelievable Life of Neera Arya (2025) by Chronicles Of Spirit.
- Azad Hind Fauj Ke Gumnaam Sainik (1968) by Manmath Nath Gupta.
