= Xi Zhenfeng =

Chinese organic chemist

Xi Zhenfeng (Chinese: 席振峰; pinyin: Xí Zhènfēng; born April 2, 1963, in Henan) is a Chinese organic chemist.

Xi received his B.S. degree from Xiamen University in 1983, and his M.S. degree from Nanjing University, Zhengzhou University and Henan Institute of Chemistry in 1989. He joined Professor Tamotsu Takahashi's group at the Institute for Molecular Sciences, Japan, as a Ph.D. course student in 1993 and obtained a Ph.D. degree in 1996.

He took an assistant professor position at Hokkaido University, Japan, in 1997, after he worked as a postdoctoral research fellow with Professor Takahashi at Catalyst Research Centre, Hokkaido University. In 1998, he joined the Department of Chemistry, Peking University, China, as an associate professor and was promoted to professor in 1999. He is a Chang Jiang Scholar Distinguished Professor (since 2001) of Peking University. In 2015, he became the academician of Chinese Academy of Sciences.

His research interests are focused on organometallic chemistry and organic synthesis, including development of synthetic methodologies based on selective cleavage of C–H, C–C and C–X bonds mediated by organometallic compounds, development of organometallic reagents, study on mechanisms of reactions involving reactive organometallic intermediates, and synthesis of functional structures.

He is now serving as editor or consultant for several international academic journals, including:

- Applied Organometallic Chemistry (John-Wiley), Associate Editor (since 2008).
- Tetrahedron and Tetrahedron Letters (Elsevier), Board of Consulting Editors (since 2008).
- Synlett and Synthesis (Thieme), Advisory Board (since 2009).
- Asian Journal of Organic Chemistry (John-Wiley), Editorial Board (since 2012).
- Organic Letters (ACS), Associate Editor (since 2013).

He has been visiting professors for several universities/institutes in the worlds, including:

- Hokkaido University, Japan, 2006
- University of Rennes 1, France, 2007
- RIKEN, Japan, 2010
