= Chhaju Ram Lamba =

Indian businessman and philanthropist (1861–1943)

Seth Sir Chajju Ram Lamba
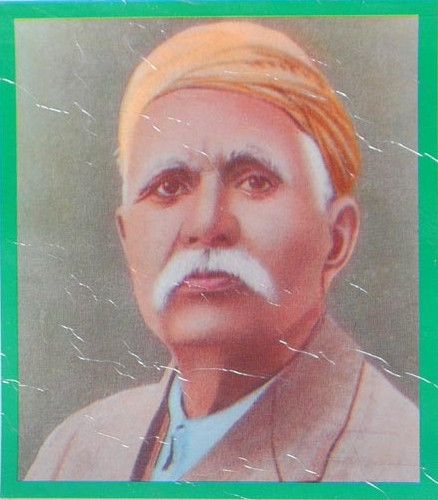
- Born: 1861; Alakhpura, Bhiwani district, Haryana
- Died: April 7, 1943 (aged 81–82); Kolkata
- Spouse(s): First Wife Dohaka (d. before1899); Laxmi Devi (m. 1899)
- Relatives: Adopted Daughter- Neera Arya Adopted Son - Basant Kumar

Seth Sir Chhaju Ram Lamba (1861 – 7 April 1943) was a tycoon from Punjab Province. He made a fortune in Calcutta during the period of the British Raj. He was a philanthropist, and undertook many social improvement projects. He financed the higher studies of future politician Sir Chhotu Ram.

== Early life and career ==
Chhaju Ram was born in a Hindu Jat family in 1861 at Alakhpura in Bawani Khera tehsil, Bhiwani district of then Punjab (presently in Haryana state). His father was Chaudhary Salig Ram Lamba who had migrated from the village of Gothra in Jhunjhunu district, Rajasthan.

He was married twice. His first wife was from the village Dohaka. She died from cholera, and they had no children from the marriage. He married Lakshmi Devi Rangi of the village Bilawal in Bhiwani district and had children with her.

When in his early 20s, Lamba met Arya Samajist engineer Raisaheb Shivnath Rai, who very much impressed him. Rai took Lamba to Calcutta, and for a time Lamba coached Rai’s children and also those of a businessman from Rajgarh. During this work he picked up knowledge of their operations and in particular of the dalali (brokerage business or commission agency). He began to trade in old bags, and later shifted to the new bags trade.

He set up secret associations to collectively oppose British rule without ruining his reputation among the Englishmen.

== Philanthropy ==
He adopted siblings named Neera Arya and her brother Basant. He started many hostels, libraries, dharamshalas and schools, such as Jat School, Hisar (founded 1924). He financed higher studies of Sir 'Chhotu' Ram Richpal. He was known as Danveer Bhamashah of the Jats. The British government awarded him the life peerage title of "Sir". He was prominent follower of Arya Samaj.

== Legacy ==
Several prominent jat institutes are named after him, including the following:

- CRM JAT College
- Chhaju Ram Law College, Hisar
- Chhaju Ram College of Education, Hisar
- Chhaju Ram Jat Senior Secondary School, Hisar
- Chhaju Ram Public School, Hisar
- Numerous Dharamshalas across Punjab-Haryana-Rajasthan, often near railway stations.
