= Babes (TV series) =

1990 American television series

- Genre: Sitcom
- Created by: Tracey Jackson; Gail Parent
- Starring: Susan Peretz; Wendie Jo Sperber; Lesley Boone; Rick Overton; Nedra Volz
- Opening theme: "Babes"
- Composer: Jay Gruska
- Country of origin: United States
- Original language: English
- No. of seasons: 1
- No. of episodes: 22

Production
- Executive producers: Candace Farrell; Sandy Gallin; Jordan Moffet; Brian Levant
- Camera setup: Multi-camera
- Running time: 30 minutes
- Production companies: Sandollar Productions; 20th Century Fox Television

Original release
- Network: Fox
- Release: September 13, 1990 – May 9, 1991

Babes is an American sitcom series that aired Thursdays at 8:30 for one season on Fox from September 13, 1990, to May 9, 1991. Reruns were shown Saturdays at 9:30 from July to August 1991. It was created by Gail Parent and Tracey Jackson and executive produced for 20th Century Fox Television by Sandollar Productions, a former production company run by Sandy Gallin and Dolly Parton.

== Overview ==
The series follows a trio of overweight sisters facing the challenges of work, relationships, popularity, and starting a family. The ladies also shared a small one-bedroom apartment in New York City, which added to the comic friction.

The Gilbert sisters include Darlene (Susan Peretz), the eldest, who was a dog groomer and recently divorced (her husband had an affair with their weight-loss counselor); Charlene (Wendie Jo Sperber), the middle sister, who was a makeup artist for a commercial photographer and was the most active one out of the three; and Marlene (Lesley Boone), the youngest sister, a former toll collector (and later an actress in a pantyhose commercial and a soap opera), who was seen as a dreamer with a naive, trusting personality. Also in the cast was Charlene's boyfriend, Ronnie Underwood (Rick Overton), a restaurant owner. He disappeared at mid-season, as a result putting all three sisters on the dating market. At that time, the girls' landlady, Florence Newman (Nedra Volz), became a regular.

All three also had physical comedy experience on their resume, and those skills were put to use in the series. Among the notable examples: Charlene getting in a helium-filled dress, Darlene breaking a hockey stick while attending a New York Rangers game, Marlene waking the sisters up with potato chips after they didn't hear her come in, and all three sisters ganging up on a mime after he mocked them.

== Cast ==
- Wendie Jo Sperber as Charlene Gilbert
- Susan Peretz as Darlene Gilbert
- Lesley Boone as Marlene Gilbert
- Rick Overton as Ronnie Underwood
- Nedra Volz as Mrs. Florence Newman

== Episodes ==
No.	Title	Directed by	Written by	Original release date	Prod. code
1	"Pilot"	Michael Lessac	Tracey Jackson & Gail Parent	September 13, 1990	7E79
Charlene's romantic night with Ronnie — and her life of living by herself — is ruined when Darlene moves in after her husband Wilbur has an affair and Marlene loses her job as a New Jersey Turnpike toll collector. Note: This episode had a different opening; it was replaced after it was re-aired.
2	"Bend Me, Shape Me"	Michael Lessac	Rick Copp & David A. Goodman	September 20, 1990	7E01
Charlene tries to get Darlene and Marlene to become weight conscious after she shows a workout video, but the two don't want to weigh in on the reaction when they are enticed by Charlene to join a health club, which comes true for Charlene after she receives the prejudicial taunting after they join. Erica Yohn guest-stars. Note: beginning with this episode, a new opening is used, replacing the one used in the pilot.
3	"Everything But Love"	Michael Lessac	David Silverman & Stephen Sustarsic	September 27, 1990	7E02
In an effort to clean up Darlene's love life and to get her mind off Wilbur (Brandon Maggart), Charlene takes her to an unlikely place to meet guys—the neighborhood laundromat. The experience also gives Darlene a chance to wash herself clean from her 14 years of marriage after she realizes that Wilbur doesn't really know anything about Darlene.
4	"The One Where Charlene Meets Ronnie's Mother"	Michael Lessac	Dennis Snee	October 11, 1990	7E04
Things do not go as planned when Charlene meets Ronnie's mother (Dena Dietrich).
5	"Temper, Temper"	Michael Lessac	Cindy Begel & Lesa Kite	October 18, 1990	7E03
Darlene's temper becomes an issue after Wilbur (Brandon Maggart) demands spousal support.
6	"No Regrets"	Michael Lessac	Greg Phillips	October 25, 1990	7E05
The sisters have a life-changing experience after surviving a near-fatal accident that almost crushed them to death. Jeff Corey and Gretchen Wyler guest-star.
7	"Dream Vacation"	Michael Lessac	Al Aidekman	November 1, 1990	7E07
Actually, the girls are in for a nightmare when they visit "Club Cabo" in this Fantasy Island-inspired episode. Cesar Romero guest stars as the "Mr. Roarke"-like resort owner.
8	"Marlene's Problem"	Michael Lessac	Lesa Kite & Cindy Begel	November 8, 1990	7E06
After Charlene's interference that results in losing her job as the "Hefty Hose Girl", Marlene lands a job on a TV soap opera. Meanwhile, Darlene babysits a puppy that really dogs her out. Matt McCoy guest-stars.
9	"The Thanksgiving Show"	Michael Lessac	Story by : Jordan Moffet & Jeff Stein; Teleplay by : Jordan Moffet	November 22, 1990	7E08
After vowing they would not eat anything on Thanksgiving Day, the Gilberts meets a homeless man (played by Baby D) and promises him that they would serve him a Thanksgiving dinner.
10	"Ribs"	Don Corvan	Jeff Stein	December 6, 1990	7E09
The girls help Ronnie watch over his restaurant while he is away on vacation. It is what happens afterwards when he returns that will change Charlene's life forever. Note: This will be Rick Overton's last appearance in the series as a regular.
11	"Rent Strike"	Howard Murray	David Silverman & Stephen Sustarsic	December 20, 1990	7E10
The girls organize a rent strike to get the landlord (Tracey Walter) to fix the repairs in the building—only to learn that he transferred the ownership of the building to the tenants, which means the Gilberts now have to deal with their own home issues. Note: This will be Nerda Volz's first appearance in the series as a regular.
12	"Most Likely to Succeed"	Don Corvan	Lesa Kite & Cindy Begel	January 10, 1991	7E12
In an effort to prove that she has accomplished everything she said she would after graduating high school, Charlene does just that in time for her high school reunion.
13	"All Bummed Out"	Howard Murray	David Silverman & Stephen Sustarsic	January 24, 1991	7E14
For Lent, Charlene says it involves sacrifice, so the girls get a homeless man (William Windom) cleaned up and he lands a job. However, when he turns his back on them, the girls feel he owes at least some gratitude.
14	"Babes, Lies & Videotape"	Howard Murray	Dava Savel	January 31, 1991	7E11
Things are really cooking for the Gilberts when Marlene, Darlene and Charlene tries to serve up a chance to romance a chef that Marlene was doing a dating videotape for. Wolfgang Puck guest stars.
15	"Hello, Dolly"	Howard Murray	Rick Copp & David A. Goodman	February 7, 1991	7E13
Charlene lands a job as Dolly Parton's makeup artist, which comes at the same time as a series of rumors about the singer hits the tabloids. Lucy Lee Flippin guest stars.
16	"Babes in Boyland"	Howard Murray	Dava Savel	February 14, 1991	7E15
It's off to Alaska as Charlene and Marlene mine the last frontier for single guys. Meanwhile, back in NYC, a single guy from Alaska visits Darlene.
17	"Mom"	Howard Murray	Chuck Upton	February 21, 1991	7E16
The Gilberts' mother (Barbara Barrie) visits, and it's not all family-friendly when she starts coddling them and blaming Charlene for turning her away.
18	"The Last Temptation of Marlene"	Art Dielhenn	Rick Copp & David A. Goodman	March 14, 1991	7E17
Just as Marlene starts to make a vow to give up dating, she meets an unlikely guy (Steve Witting) at a punk music record store.
19	"The House of Gilbert"	Art Dielhenn	Chuck Distler	March 28, 1991	7E18
A House of Style-inspired episode which finds the Gilberts becoming fashion designers after a department store notices Charlene's unique designs. But they're about to find out soon enough that their new venture is not as fashionable as they envisioned. Leslie Jordan and Susan Kellerman guest-star.
20	"Not Married...with Children"	Rob Schiller	Suzanne Kay	April 25, 1991	7E19
After being placed on probation for causing an incident at a New York Rangers game, child-hater Darlene takes her community-service job of being a teacher to a group of children so seriously that she now wants to have children.
21	"11 Angry Men and Charlene"	Howard Murray	David Silverman & Stephen Sustarsic	May 2, 1991	7E20
Charlene falls for a fellow juror (Christopher Rich) while she is on jury duty. Sal Viscuso guest-stars.
22	"Three's a Crowd"	Howard Murray	Rick Copp & David A. Goodman	May 9, 1991	7E21
Fed up with living in a one-bedroom apartment, the sisters search for bigger space. But tensions may force the trio to space out on their own.

== International broadcasts ==
The series also aired in France under the title Jamais Deux Sans Trois (Never Two Without Three). In Israel the show was titled Nashim Gdolot (Big Women).
