= Ishtam =

Ishtam may refer to these Indian films:

- Ishtam (2001 Malayalam film), directed by Sibi Malayil starring Dileep and Navya Nair
- Ishtam (2001 Telugu film), directed by Vikram Kumar and Raj Kumar starring Shriya Saran
- Ishtam (2012 film), Tamil film directed by Prem Nizar, starring Vimal and Nisha Aggarwal
