= Mathil =

2021 Indian film by Mithran R. Jawahar

- Promotional Poster
- Directed by: Mithran R. Jawahar
- Written by: Jothi Arunachalam; Ezhichur Aravindan
- Produced by: Singa Sankaran (SS Group)
- Starring: K. S. Ravikumar; Mime Gopi; Madhumita
- Cinematography: G. Balamurugan
- Edited by: M. Thiyagarajan
- Music by: L. V. Muthu Ganesh
- Production company: SS Group
- Distributed by: ZEE5
- Release date: 14 April 2021
- Running time: 104 minutes
- Country: India
- Language: Tamil

Mathil (transl. Wall) is a 2021 Indian Tamil-language drama film directed by Mithran R. Jawahar. The film stars K. S. Ravikumar, Mime Gopi and Madhumita. The cinematography and film editing were handled by G. Balamurugan and M. Thiyagarajan, respectively. The film was digitally released on ZEE5 on 14 April 2021.

== Plot ==
Lakshmikanthan (K. S. Ravikumar), a theater artist who is enjoying his retired life, is a happy man now as his long dream of owning a home comes true. As someone who has seen his father's struggles without having a home, he is so attached with the newly-built home and shares the same with his daughter, son, and daughter-in-law. But little does he know that his happiness will be short-lived. One day, a few goons who work for Senathipathi (Mime Gopi), a dreaded politician in the locality, paint their party symbol on Lakshmi's house wall. Upon complaining to the nearby sub-inspector Veeramuthu (Srinath), a miffed Sena uses his influence and ensures that the power supply to Lakshmi's house is cut off. Lakshmi's friends restore power supply in a far-fetched but partly enjoyable scene, and this irks Sena again. He, in return, destroys his house wall, after which both of them declare war against each other. Lakshmi is a middle-class common man who hardly has any influence, while Sena, on the other hand, is close to being chosen by his party as the MLA candidate. Whether Lakshmi and his drama troupe are able to succeed in this battle against Sena forms the rest of the story.

== Cast ==
- K. S. Ravikumar as Lakshmikanthan
- Mime Gopi as Senathipathi
- Shanjith as Vinoth
- Lollu Sabha Swaminathan as Ganesan
- Madhumitha
- Dhivya Duraisamy as Shanmathi
- Srinath as Sub-Inspector Veeramuthu
- Aathreyaa as Hacker
- Rajasimman
- Kathadi Ramamurthy

== Release ==
The film was digitally released on 14 April 2021 on ZEE5.

== Reception ==
Thinkal Menon of The Times of India rated the film two-and-a--half out of five stars and wrote, "With a run time of less than two hours, Mathil is an okayish film with a few interesting scenes which throw light on a social issue". Avinash Ramachandran of Cinema Express rated the film two out of five stars and wrote, "The biggest strength of the Mithran Jawahar directorial is definitely KS Ravikumar, who makes a solid start in his first-ever film as the lead".
