= Tracey Jackson =

American screenwriter

- Born: May 12, 1958 (age 66); Los Angeles, California, U.S.
- Occupation(s): Author, film director, blogger, screenwriter, producer
- Website: traceyjacksononline.com

Tracey Jackson (born May 12, 1958) is an American author, screenwriter, blogger, film director, and producer. Over the course of her career, she has worked across multiple mediums, including film, television, and publishing. She is known for her work on feature films such as The Guru (2002), The Other End of the Line (2008), and Confessions of a Shopaholic (2009). Jackson is also the author of two books, including the New York Times bestseller Gratitude and Trust: Six Affirmations That Will Change Your Life (2014), co-written with Paul Williams. And Between a Rock and a Hot Place.

== Career ==
A year after getting to Hollywood she created the FOX sitcom Babes, a show centered on the lives of three plus-sized sisters. Her film credits include Working Title’s The Guru (2002), The Other End of the Line (2008), a concept centered around international call centers. Jackson was one of the first people in Hollywood to start blending Bollywood and Hollywood together.

She is also known for her adaptation of the bestseller Confessions of a Shopaholic (2009) for producer Jerry Bruckheimer. Jackson directed and produced and starred in the documentary Lucky Ducks, an exploration of modern parenting and privilege. After the 2008 Writers Guild of America strike, Jackson shifted her focus to writing books.

Her first book, Between a Rock and a Hot Place: Why Fifty Is Not the New Thirty (2011), was published by Harper Collins and earned her appearances on The Today Show, Martha Stewart's TV Show, and other major platforms. The book was also featured as an Oprah Book Pick in O, The Oprah Magazine. Her second book, Gratitude and Trust: Six Affirmations That Will Change Your Life (2014), co-written with musician and actor Paul Williams.

Jackson made an appearance with Paul Williams on Oprah's Super Soul Sunday Show and podcast. She was included in Oprah’s books The Path Made Clear and The Wisdom of Sundays.

Jackson and Williams had their own podcast based on the book that ran on PODCAST ONE. She has maintained a personal blog for over 20 years, showcasing her reflections on life, culture, and the entertainment industry. She has also contributed articles to The Huffington Post and Air Mail. In 2016, Jackson sold a pilot script titled Team Life to Fremantle.

== Personal life ==
Tracey Jackson is married to Glenn Horowitz, a bookseller based in New York City. She is the mother of two daughters.

The couple resides in New York, where Jackson continues to develop projects.

== Bibliography ==
- Between a Rock and a Hot Place: Why Fifty Is Not the New Thirty (2012)
- Gratitude and Trust: Six Affirmations That Will Change Your Life (2014, with Paul Williams)

== Filmography ==
=== As actor ===
- Heartburn (1986, as Hairdresser's Friend)

=== Screenplays ===
- Babes (1990, 1 episode)
- The Guru (2002)
- The Other End of the Line (2008)
- Confessions of a Shopaholic (2009, with Tim Firth and Kayla Alpert)
- Lucky Ducks (2009, also written and directed)
