= A. Srinath =

Indian politician (born 1973)

Cabinet Minister Government of Tamil Nadu
- Incumbent
- Assumed office 21 May 2026
- Governor: Rajendra Arlekar
- Chief Minister: C. Joseph Vijay
- Ministry and Departments: Fisheries

Member of the Tamil Nadu Legislative Assembly
- Incumbent
- Assumed office 4 May 2026
- Chief Minister: C. Joseph Vijay
- Preceded by: P. Geetha Jeevan
- Constituency: Thoothukkudi

Personal details
- Born: Srinath Alnath; 18 July 1973 (age 53) Madras, Tamil Nadu, India (present-day Chennai)
- Party: Tamilaga Vettri Kazhagam
- Children: 1
- Parent: Alnath (father)
- Profession: Actor; Director; Politician

Alnath Srinath (born 18 July 1973) is an Indian actor and politician. He is a member of the Tamil Nadu Legislative Assembly for the constituency of Thoothukkudi representing the Tamilaga Vettri Kazhagam. He was also an actor and film director in the Tamil cinema industry prior to his political career.

== Personal life and career ==
Srinath is the eldest son of Mr. Alnath Fernando, son of Mr. Richard Fernando from Manapad. His grandfather, Mr. Richard Fernando owned and operated a sailing ship (Dhoni) (TN.30 Eric Allnath) in Thoothukudi.

He has been a friend of Tamil actor Vijay since they were in college and has worked with him in several films.

He worked as an assistant director with director Jeeva, who gave him a break as an actor with films like Ullam Ketkumae (2005) and Unnale Unnale (2007). He is known for his roles in films like Santosh Subramaniam (2008), Maasilamani (2009) and Vettaikkaaran (2009), turned into a director with Muthirai (2009) followed by Vallavanukku Pullum Aayudham (2014), starring Santhanam. For his third directorial venture, Leg Piece (2025) starring Yogi Babu in the lead with an ensemble of comedy stars.

In 2026, he contested and won for TVK in Thoothukkudi.

== Filmography ==
All films are in Tamil, unless otherwise noted.

=== Actor ===
Year	Title	Role	Notes
1992	Naalaya Theerpu	Vijay's friend	
1996	Maanbumigu Maanavan	Sundar	
2001	12B	Bolt	Also assistant director
2002	Yai! Nee Romba Azhaga Irukke!	Ravi	
2002	Kadhal Virus	Postman	
2003	Alai	Aathi's friend	
2005	Ullam Ketkumae	Pathchu	
2006	Vattaram	Veena's brother	
2007	Unnale Unnale	Vaithyanathan	credited as Vaithyanathan
2008	Bheema	Guru	
2008	Singakutty	Kathir's friend	
2008	Santosh Subramaniam	Guna	
2008	Dhaam Dhoom	Chinnavar	
2008	Mahesh, Saranya Matrum Palar	Vaithyanathan	
2009	Aadatha Aattamellam	Ashok's friend	
2009	Anandha Tandavam		
2009	Maasilamani	Kathir	
2009	Eeram	Vignesh (Vicky)	
2009	Vettaikkaaran	Valayaapathi	
2010	Kutty	Arjun's right-hand man	
2010	Uthamaputhiran	David	
2011	Vaada Poda Nanbargal		
2011	Aadu Puli	Idhayakanni's friend	
2011	Rowthiram	Ashok	
2011	Mahaan Kanakku	Professor Varatharajan	
2012	Manam Kothi Paravai	Nayar	
2012	Etho Seithai Ennai		
2013	Karuppampatti	Anglee	
2013	Yaaruda Mahesh	Randy	
2014	Inga Enna Solluthu		
2014	Angusam	Shiva's friend	
2014	Vallavanukku Pullum Aayudham		Also director; special appearance
2016	Uyire Uyire	Shiva's coworker	
2017	Aarambamey Attakasam		
2019	Kaaviyyan	Bhaskar	
2021	Master	JD's friend	
2021	Pazhagiya Naatkal		
2021	Kaadan	Attorney	
2021	Mathil	Sub-inspector	
2023	Echo	Rajesh	
2023	Let's Get Married	Deepa's husband	
2023	Moondram Manithan	Gautham	
2024	Saala	Saala's friend	
2025	Leg Piece	"Pei" Murugesan	
2025	Sumo	Kasa Kasa Asahi Sake	
2025	Kumki 2		
2026	Jana Nayagan	Ilyas	

=== Director ===
- Muthirai (2009)
- Vallavanukku Pullum Aayudham (2014)
- Leg Piece (2025)

=== Television ===
- 2007-2008: Kadhalikka Neramillai
