= Meendum Oru Kadhal Kadhai =

2016 film by Mithran R. Jawahar

- Official poster
- Directed by: Mithran R. Jawahar
- Based on: Thattathin Marayathu by Vineeth Sreenivasan
- Produced by: Sangili Murugan
- Starring: Walter Phillips; Isha Talwar
- Cinematography: Vishnu Sarma
- Edited by: M. Thiyagarajan
- Music by: G. V. Prakash Kumar
- Production company: Block Ticket Films
- Distributed by: Kalaippuli Films International
- Release date: 26 August 2016
- Running time: 144 minutes
- Country: India
- Language: Tamil

Meendum Oru Kadhal Kadhai (transl. Once Again a Love Story) is a 2016 Tamil-language romantic musical film directed by Mithran R. Jawahar, starring Walter Philips and Isha Talwar. It is a remake of the Malayalam film Thattathin Marayathu, with Talwar reprising her role.

== Plot ==
The film is the story of Vinod and Aisha, belonging to Hinduism and Islam respectively, falling in love, and the conflict arising out between them.

== Cast ==
- Walter Phillips as Vinod
- Isha Talwar as Aisha
- Nassar as Abdul Kader
- Som Shekar as Musthafa
- Thalaivasal Vijay as Abdul Rahman
- Manoj K. Jayan as S.I.
- Arjunan as Abdul Razak (Abu)
- Vanitha Krishnachandran as Vinod's mother
- Durga Premjith as Asma, the teacher's kid
- Shan as Imran
- Venkatesh Harinathan as Altaf
- Vidyullekha Raman as Hamzah
- Singamuthu as Police officer
- Sangili Murugan
- Dhivya as Aisha's sister
- Roxanne as Nasreen
- Harish Ram as Manoj

== Production ==
It was reported in 2015 that Mithran R. Jawahar would direct the Tamil remake of Malayalam film Thattathin Marayathu. Newcomer Walter Philips was cast opposite Isha Talwar who was selected to reprise her role from the original. The film's motion poster was released in February 2015.

== Soundtrack ==
The soundtrack was composed by G. V. Prakash Kumar with lyrics written by Na. Muthukumar and Thamarai. The music was released on 8 April 2016 by Sony Music India.

Track listing
No.	Title	Lyrics	Singer(s)	Length
1.	"Mai Pottu"	Arunraja Kamaraj	Ranjith, Velmurugan	05:08
2.	"Hey Pennae"	Na. Muthukumar	G. V. Prakash Kumar, Ranina Reddy	05:49
3.	"Mohini"	Thamarai	D. Sathyaprakash	05:16
4.	"Yedhedho Penne"	Na. Muthukumar	Ajeesh, Harini	04:37
5.	"Yen Nenjam Sidharudhu"	Na. Muthukumar	D. Sathyaprakash	04:31
6.	"An Autumn Evening (Theme)"	NA	Ranina Reddy, Nadisha Thomas	03:05
7.	"Kuthala Kathaga"	Ekadesi	Vednath	04:11
8.	"Mai Pottu (Karoke)"			05:08
9.	"Mohini (Karoke)"			05:16
Total length:				43:01

== Reception ==
Gautaman Bhaskaran of the Hindustan Times gave 1 out of 5 stars, writing "A love story with the lovers from different backgrounds has been done to death onscreen. This is yet another attempt at the old tale that adds nothing new". Anupama Subramaniam of Deccan Chronicle wrote that "Director Mithran has managed to recreate the magic of the original to some extent". Shomini Sen of News18 wrote "Meendum Oru Kadhal Kathai tries to calm us down with some good old love. There’s no problem in that. Everybody loves to watch love on-screen. The problem is in the very soul of the film".
