= Azad Bharath =

2026 Indian film by Roopa Iyer

- Theatrical release poster
- Directed by: Roopa Iyer
- Written by: Roopa Iyer; M. Rajendra Rajan
- Screenplay by: Roopa Iyer
- Produced by: Roopa Iyer; Jaya Gopal AB; Rajendra Rajan
- Starring: Shreyas Talpade; Roopa Iyer; Suresh Oberoi
- Cinematography: Hari Vedant; Shrinivas Ramaiah
- Edited by: Crazy Mindz Sri
- Music by: Gautham Srivatsa
- Production companies: Zee Studios; India Classic Arts; Transindia Media
- Distributed by: Zee Studios
- Release date: 2 January 2026
- Running time: 120 minutes
- Country: India
- Language: Hindi

Azad Bharath is a 2026 Indian Hindi-language historical film starring Shreyas Talpade, Suresh Oberoi, Roopa Iyer, and Indira Tiwari. Directed by Roopa Iyer, the film is set against the backdrop of the Indian National Army, with a focus on its women's unit, the Rani of Jhansi Regiment (also known as the Rani Laxmibai Regiment). The film is produced by Zee Studios and India Classic Arts and it had its worldwide theatrical release on 2 January 2026.

== Synopsis ==
The film depicts the role of the Rani of Jhansi Regiment, a women's combat unit associated with the Indian National Army during India's independence movement. The narrative examines the experiences, training, and participation of women soldiers within the regiment.

The storyline highlights the life of Neera Arya, presented as one of the regiment's members, using her experiences to represent the broader participation of women in the armed resistance movement of the period.

== Cast ==
- Shreyas Talpade as Subhas Chandra Bose
- Roopa Iyer as Neera Arya
- Suresh Oberoi as Chhaju Ramji
- Dr. Subhash Chandra as Neera's mentor
- Priyanshu Chatterjee as Shrikant Ranjan Das
- Indira Tiwari as Saraswati Rajamani
- Suchendra Prasad

== Production ==
The film is produced by Roopa Iyer, Jayagopal A.B., and M. Rajendra Rajan. It is jointly backed by India Classic Arts and Zee Studios. The film's music and background score are composed by Gautham Srivatsa, with lyrics written by Sameer Anjaan. Amruta Fadnavis sang the vocals for the film's anthem. The official trailer of Azad Bharath was launched in Mumbai by Amruta Fadnavis.

== Reception ==
Dhaval Roy of The Times of India rated it 1.5/5 stars and said that "Although the film takes up an important and powerful chapter of history, its treatment and execution make it an underwhelming outing." Vinamra Mathur of Firstpost gave 3 stars out of 5 and said that "Azad Bharath is a reminder that freedom movements are not only led by famous voices, but also by fearless footsteps that history sometimes fails to record. The film honors those footsteps — loud enough for the present to hear." Deccan Chronicle rated it 3/5 stars and said that "If you're looking for a movie that'll leave you feeling inspired and proud, this should be the one."

ABP News rated the film 3.5 stars out of 5 and stated that "Azad Bharath stands out as a powerful patriotic film that restores the legacy of a forgotten heroine. With research-driven direction, strong performances, and emotional resonance, the film emerges as one of the most impactful entries in the genre this year. More than a cinematic experience, it serves as a tribute to courage and remembrance."

Bhawna Arya of Times Now gave 3 stars out of 5 and writes her review that "Azad Bharath is a powerful, moving tribute to the unsung women of India’s freedom struggle. With strong direction, gripping performances, and an emotional core, it’s more than a historical drama; it’s a reminder that history is made not just by famous names, but by fearless footsteps that demand to be remembered."
