= Mithran R. Jawahar =

Indian Film director and Screenwriter

- Born: 20 November 1973 (age 52); Trichy, Tamil Nadu, India
- Occupation: Film director Screenwriter

Mithran R. Jawahar (born 20 November 1973) is an Indian film director who works predominantly in Tamil cinema.

== Career ==
Jawahar, a former assistant of Selvaraghavan, began working on his first film starring Dhanush in December 2004. A remake of the Telugu film Arya (2004), the film was later put on hold and restarted at a later date. As a result, his debut venture was the 2008 film Yaaradi Nee Mohini, starring Dhanush and Nayantara, which was a runaway hit. The film was a remake of the Telugu film Aadavari Matalaku Arthale Verule, directed by Selvaraghavan.

His next two films Kutty (2010) and Uthamaputhiran (2010), both again remakes and again featuring Dhanush in the lead role, also became successful.

In 2014, Jawahar began work on Saamiyattam, a remake of the Telugu film Swamy Ra Ra, produced and featuring Srikanth in the lead role, but it was later shelved.

He then moved on to direct a remake of the Malayalam film Thattathin Marayathu, titled Meendum Oru Kadhal Kadhai, in 2016.

In 2021, Jawahar made his first original script with the social drama Mathil, which starred director-actor K. S. Ravikumar in the lead role which was made for digital platform Zee5.

In 2022, he directed the film Thiruchitrambalam, which was his fourth collaboration with Dhanush, which also went to do well at the box-office.

== Filmography ==
- Note: All films are in Tamil unless otherwise noted.

Filmography of Mithran R. Jawahar
Year	Film	Notes
2008	Yaaradi Nee Mohini	Remake of Aadavari Matalaku Arthale Verule (2007)
2010	Kutty	Remake of Arya (2004)
2010	Uthamaputhiran	Remake of Ready (2008)
2016	Meendum Oru Kadhal Kadhai	Remake of Thattathin Marayathu (2012)
2021	Mathil	Released on ZEE5
2022	Thiruchitrambalam	Cameo appearance as a traffic police officer
2023	Ariyavan	
