= Narayan Sadashiv Hosmane =

Indian-American cancer research scientist (born 1948)

- Born: 30 June 1948 (age 78); Gokarna, India
- Occupation: Professor
- Scientific career
- Fields: Chemistry and Biochemistry

Narayan S. Hosmane (born 30 June 1948) is an Indian-born cancer research scientist and a distinguished research professor of Chemistry and Biochemistry. He was featured in NRI Achievers magazine. He is a two-time recipient of the Humboldt Research Award for senior scientists, an annual award presented by the Alexander von Humboldt Foundation, Bonn, Germany, to scientists worldwide in recognition of their career accomplishments.

He founded "Boron in the Americas" (formerly known as BUSA) and hosted the organization's first meeting in Dallas in April 1988. He has published over 300 papers in scientific journals and was ranked by the Institute for Scientific Information (ISI) in the top 50% of the most cited chemists in the world from 1981–1997. He is a fellow of the Royal Society of Chemistry and the American Institute of Chemists, a foreign member of Russian Academy of Natural Sciences (RANS), and listed in Who's Who in the World.

== Early life ==
Hosmane was born in Gokarna, Uttar Kannada district, India, in 1948, to a Havyaka Brahmin family. He earned his high school diploma from Bhadrakali High School, Gokarna in 1964, and attended Dr. A. V. Baliga college, Kumta, where he earned his Bachelor of Science in Chemistry with Botany as a minor.

He is married to Sumathy Rao, who is from a Konkani-speaking family. They have a daughter and a son.

== Academic career ==
Hosmane earned a Master of Science degree from Karnataka University, India. He obtained a Ph.D. degree in Organometallic/Inorganic Chemistry in 1974 from the University of Edinburgh, Scotland, with a dissertation titled 'Some reactions of stannic chloride with silicon hydrides and some novel group IV derivatives of mercury.'

After postdoctoral research at Queen's University Belfast, he joined the Lambeg Industrial Research Institute in Northern Ireland, and then moved to the United States to study carboranes and metallacarboranes. After postdoctoral work with Russell Grimes at the University of Virginia, he joined the faculty at the Virginia Polytechnic Institute and State University in 1979.
In 1982, he joined the faculty at Southern Methodist University, where he became Professor of Chemistry in 1989. In 1998, he moved to Northern Illinois University and is currently a Distinguished Research Professor of Chemistry and Biochemistry and the Inaugural Board of Trustees Professor.

In 2011, while attempting to produce single-walled carbon nanotubes, Hosmane discovered that a known technique for carbon production (burning magnesium with dry ice) produced layers of graphene.

== Professional career ==
Year	Professional Career
1974–1975	Postdoctoral Research Assistant, Queen's University Belfast w/ Frank Glockling.
1975–1976	Research Scientist, Catalysis Section, Lambeg Industrial Research Institute, N. Ireland
1976–1977	Research Associate, Auburn University, Auburn, Alabama w/ W. E. Hill and F. A. Johnson.
1977–1979	Research Associate, University of Virginia, Charlottesville, Virginia w/ Russell N. Grimes.
1979–1982	Assistant Professor, Virginia Tech, Blacksburg, Virginia.
1982–1986	Assistant Professor (tenure track), Department of Chemistry, Southern Methodist University.
1986–1989	Associate Professor (with tenure), Department of Chemistry, Southern Methodist University.
1989 – 7/1998	Full Professor, Department of Chemistry, Southern Methodist University.
8/1998 – 7/2001	Full Professor, Department of Chemistry and Biochemistry, Northern Illinois University, DeKalb, IL.
7/2001 – 6/2005	Presidential Research Professor, Department of Chemistry and Biochemistry, Northern Illinois University, DeKalb, IL.
7/2005–present	Distinguished Research Professor, Department of Chemistry and Biochemistry, Northern Illinois University, DeKalb, IL.
7/2008–present	Board of Trustees Professor, Department of Chemistry and Biochemistry, Northern Illinois University, DeKalb, IL.

== Professional affiliations ==
- Fellow of the Royal Society of Chemistry (CChem FRSC)
- Fellow of the American Institute of Chemists (FAIC)
- Member of the American Chemical Society (ACS)
- Member of the Sigma Xi Society
- Member of the International Council on Main Group Chemistry, Inc. (ICMGC)

== Boards and editorships ==
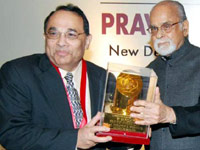
Prof. Dr. Narayan S. Hosmane receiving "Lifetime Achievement Pravasi Award"

- Section Editor of Applied Organometallic Chemistry, 2003–present
- International Editorial Advisory Board for Organometallics, a journal of the American Chemical Society, Jan 2006–present
- Regional Editor of Molecules, an international Internet journal.
- Editorial boards, Main Group Metal Chemistry (1999 – present) and Main Group Chemistry (2006 – present)
- Guest Editor, Special Issue of the Applied Organometallic Chemistry – Main Group Metal Compounds commemorating 65th birthday of Professor Thomas P. Fehlner entitled "Recent Advances in Inorganometallic Chemistry" published by Wiley-VCH, in April / May 2003.
- Guest Editor, Special Issue of the Journal of Organometallic Chemistry commemorating 70th birthday of Professor Sheldon G. Shore entitled "From Borane Cages to Metal Clusters: Recent Developments," published by Elsevier Science, in November 2000.
- Guest Editor, Special Issue of Phosphorus, Sulfur, and Silicon Volume 87, Numbers 1–4, 1994) entitled "Symposium on Recent Advances in the Chemistry of the Main-Group Elements," Austin, Texas, 24–27 October 1993, published by Gordon and Breach.

== Honors and awards ==
Year	Award
2013	2013 Foreign Member to the Russian Academy of Natural Sciences (RANS)
2013	2013-Elected Member of Zeta Gamma Chapter of Phi Beta Delta – Honor Society for International Scholars.
2011	2011 Visiting Professor of the Chinese Academy of Sciences for International Senior Scientists in China
2010	2010 Inaugural Recipient of NIU Faculty Mentor Award from Northern Illinois University, USA
2008	2008 Inaugural Board of Trustees Professorship Award from Northern Illinois University, USA
2008	2007 Lifetime Achievement Pravasi Award from NRI Institute, New Delhi, India
2007	Re-Invitation of Humboldt Research Award for Senior US Scientists from Alexander von Humboldt-Stiftung, Bonn, Germany
2007	Pride of India Gold Award from NRI Institute, Washington, D.C. Chapter, USA
2005	Gauss Professor, Göttingen Academy of Sciences, Germany
2003	Pandit Jawaharlal Nehru Distinguished Chair of Chemistry, University of Hyderabad, India
2001	Humboldt Research Award for US Senior Scientists from Alexander von Humboldt-Stiftung, Bonn, Germany
2001	Outstanding Grant Acquisition Award from Northern Illinois University, DeKalb, Illinois
2001	Presidential Research Professorship Award, for significant and sustained scholarly or creative work, including the achievement of national and international reputation in the chosen field of research, from Northern Illinois University, DeKalb, Illinois
1996	BUSA Award for Distinguished Achievements in Boron Science from the Awards Committee of Boron in the USA (BUSA) Workshop held in Guanajuato, Mexico
1994	India International Gold Award, India International Gold Medal & Mother India International Award for Outstanding Contribution to the Field of Education (Chemistry) for the year 1994 from NRI Institute, New Delhi, India
1994	Camille and Henry Dreyfus Scholar / Fellow Award for the year 1994 from The Camille and Henry Dreyfus Foundation, Inc., New York
1987	Sigma Xi Outstanding Research Award for the year 1987 from the Society of Sigma Xi, Southern Methodist University Chapter
1981	Co-recipient of the Sigma Xi President's and Visitors' Research Prize, University of Virginia Chapter, Sigma Xi
