= ITFA Best Actress Award =

The ITFA Best Actress Award is given by the state government as part of its annual International Tamil Film Awards for Tamil (Kollywood) films. The award was first given in 2003.

== The list ==
Here is a list of the award winners and the films for which they won.

Year	Actress	Film
2011	Shriya Saran	Rowthiram
2008	Asin	Dasavathaaram
2004	Laila	Pithamagan
2003	Jyothika	Dhool
2002	Simran	Kannathil Muthamittal

== See also ==
- Tamil cinema
- Cinema of India
