= Susan Peretz =

American actress (1940–2004)

- Born: March 2, 1940; New York City, U.S.
- Died: August 27, 2004 (aged 64); Los Angeles, California, U.S.
- Education: SUNY Buffalo
- Occupations: Actress, acting coach
- Years active: 1973–2004

Susan Peretz (March 2, 1940 – August 27, 2004) was an American actress who performed in television and film. She starred for one season in the television series Babes and appeared in an episode each of TV's Barney Miller and Married... with Children. She appeared in the films Dog Day Afternoon, Melvin and Howard, and Honkytonk Man, among other film and television projects.

== Early life and career ==
Born in New York City, Peretz later graduated from SUNY Buffalo in Buffalo, NY. She began her acting career after joining the Actors Studio, where she later served on its executive board. She also founded and taught acting at the Third Street Theatre in Los Angeles between 1989 and 2002.

For one season, she starred in the television series Babes, along with Wendie Jo Sperber and Lesley Boone. Some of her other television appearances included episodes of ER, Murder, She Wrote, Married... with Children, My Wife and Kids, L.A. Law, and Cagney & Lacey.

== Death ==
Peretz died of breast cancer on August 27, 2004, in Los Angeles. She never married and had no children.

== Filmography ==
- Hurry Up, or I'll Be 30 (1973) as Audition Girl #2 (Miss Walsh)
- Dog Day Afternoon (1975) as Angela "Angie" Wortzik
- Prime Time a.k.a. American Raspberry (1977) as Heather
- Melvin and Howard (1980) as Chapel Owner
- Barney Miller (1981) as Norma Griswald
- In the Custody of Strangers (1982) as Big Faye
- Honkytonk Man (1982) as Miss Maud
- Swing Shift (1984) as Edith
- Oh, God! You Devil (1984) as Louise
- Poltergeist II: The Other Side (1986) as Daughter
- Retribution (1987) as Mrs. Stoller
- Sing (1989) as Mrs. Tucci
- Loose Cannons (1990) as Lady Tenant
- Married... with Children (1993) as Ms. Blaub
- Life Happens (1996) as Sarah
- Fallen Arches (1998) as Marie
- You Are So Going to Hell! (2004) as Grace
- Break a Leg (2005) as Acting Teacher
