= Kutty (2010 film) =

2010 film by Mithran Jawahar

- Theatrical release poster
- Directed by: Mithran Jawahar
- Screenplay by: Mithran Jawahar
- Based on: Arya by Sukumar
- Produced by: Raju Easwaran; T. Muthuraj
- Starring: Dhanush; Shriya Saran; Dhyan
- Cinematography: Balasubramaniem
- Edited by: Kola Bhaskar
- Music by: Devi Sri Prasad
- Production company: Gemini Film Circuit
- Distributed by: Gemini Film Circuit
- Release date: 14 January 2010
- Running time: 152 minutes
- Country: India
- Language: Tamil

Kutty (transl. Small child) is a 2010 Indian Tamil-language romantic comedy drama film directed by Mithran Jawahar. The film stars Dhanush, Shriya Saran and Dhyan (in his only Tamil film), with Radha Ravi playing a pivotal role. The film, a remake of the Telugu film Arya (2004), was produced and distributed by Gemini Film Circuit, whilst Devi Sri Prasad composed the music. It was released on 14 January 2010 coinciding with Pongal.

== Plot ==
At the Kanyakumari Beach, Geethanjali finds an abandoned personal diary and reads a poem in it. She admires the poem and writes a reply on the same page. While she and her friend watch the sunrise, she accidentally loses one of her anklets when it falls into the sea. She then sees a man dives into the sea after her anklets and she assumes that the man has drowned and died inside the sea. This incident repeatedly haunts her dreams, leaving her overwhelmed with guilt.

In the present day, in Chennai, Geethanjali eventually meets Arjun Devanayagam, a wealthy and handsome student at her college, who tries to win her affection. He proposes to her and threatens to jump from the college rooftop if she refuses him. Already burdened by guilt over what she believes to be a man's death, and unwilling to risk another man, Geethanjali accepts Arjun's love and publicly declares that she loves him in front of the entire college.

Kutty witnesses this and openly declares his love for Geethanjali in front of Arjun, shocking her and angering Arjun. Geethanjali repeatedly rejects Kutty and reminds him of her relationship with Arjun. However, Kutty insists that this does not matter to him, stating that she may continue to love Arjun while he will continue to love her unconditionally. Irritated by Kutty's persistence, Arjun confronts Kutty and attempts to intimidate him into backing off. Instead, Kutty challenges Arjun, claiming that if Arjun truly trusts his love, no one can separate him from Geethanjali. Arjun reluctantly accepts the challenge to prove his confidence. Kutty then performs various stunts to impress Geethanjali, including winning a manipulated race to protect Geethanjali's honour from Arjun, but Kutty fails to win Geethanjali's acceptance.

Meanwhile, Arjun introduces Geethanjali to his father, Minister Devanayagam, hoping to receive his approval for their marriage. However, his father, driven by political ambition, instead arranges an alliance between Arjun and a minister's daughter, portrayed as a spoilt and morally questionable young woman. In response, Arjun elopes with Geethanjali, aided by Kutty. Devanayagam's men pursue the trio, who manage to evade capture. During this time, tensions between Arjun and Kutty resurface. In a confrontation with the henchmen, Kutty fights while Arjun flees. Afterwards, Arjun leaves Geethanjali in Kutty's care without explanation.

Kutty looks after Geethanjali, and his sincerity moves her. Geethanjali gradually realises the depth of Kutty's love and regrets not having met him before committing to Arjun. Geethanjali attempts to confess her feelings, but Kutty, mistakenly believing she is scolding him, he blocks his ears and he fails to hear her.

Later, Arjun returns with his father, who now consents to their marriage. Geethanjali leaves with Arjun to proceed with their marriage. On the day of Arjun's and Geethanjali's marriage, Kutty busies himself with various arrangements of their marriage, wandering around to assist with the preparations of their. Kutty's kids friends, aware of his inner turmoil, slap him and urge him to at least express his pain. As Geethanjali makes her way to the ceremony, Kutty stops Geethanjali and openly shares his sorrow, speaking about how much he will miss her. He asks whether his love ever touched her, unaware that it already has, before dismissing his words as a joke. Geethanjali is left speechless.

Kutty's kids friends then present Geethanjali with a gift from Kutty. Inside, Geethanjali finds her lost anklets and the page of the diary on which she had written her reply at the Kanyakumari Beach. It is revealed that Kutty was the man who had dived into the sea to retrieve her anklets and whom Geethanjali had presumed dead. Realising the truth and her love for Kutty, Geethanjali breaks up her marriage with Arjun, Geethanjali runs to Kutty, and she accepts his love by hugging him.

== Cast ==
- Dhanush as Kutty
- Shriya Saran as Geethanjali
- Dhyan as Arjun Devanayagam
- Radha Ravi as Minister Devanayagam, Arjun's father
- Srinath as Arjun's right-handed man
- Vincent Asokan as Muthu
- Rajyalakshmi as Geethanjali's mother
- Aarthi as Kutty's best friend
- Mayilsamy as Paramasivam
- Swati Bhatia as Shruthi, Geethanjali's friend
- Baba Bhaskar in the song "Lifey Jollyda"
- Meghna Naidu in an item number in the song "Kannu Rendum"

== Production ==
Mithran Jawahar first started working on the remake of the Telugu film Arya (2004) in December 2004, but the project was later indefinitely put on hold. The film was eventually relaunched and titled Kadhir, but was later renamed Kutty. Jawahar collaborated with Dhanush again after Yaaradi Nee Mohini (2008). In December 2008, it was reported that the start of filming could be delayed as there were rights issues over the remake. Dhanush responded that he was scheduled to start filming from 7 December, and if the issues were not sorted out, he would have to move on to another project he had previously signed. Shriya Saran was selected as the heroine, collaborating with Dhanush for the second time after Thiruvilaiyaadal Aarambam (2006).

== Soundtrack ==
The soundtrack was composed by Devi Sri Prasad, who also composed for the original Telugu film. Out of the five songs, two songs were reused from the original, two songs were reused from Prasad's previous films, and one was newly composed.

Track listing
No.	Title	Lyrics	Singer(s)	Length
1.	"Lifey Jollyda" (reused "Dil Mange More" from Sangama)	Viveka	Devi Sri Prasad	4:50
2.	"Feel My Love" (reused namesake song from Arya)	Viveka	KK	4:56
3.	"Nee Kadhalikkum Ponnu"	Selvaraghavan	Mukesh Mohamed	4:27
4.	"Yaaro En Nenjai" (reused "Edo Priyaragam Vintunna" from Arya)	Thamarai	Sagar, Sumangali	5:08
5.	"Kannu Rendum" (reused "Yenthapani Chestiviro" from King)	Viveka	Priya Himesh, Mukesh Mohamed	4:45
Total length:				23:27

== Release ==
Kutty was released on 14 January 2010, coinciding with Pongal. It was originally set to be distributed by Sun Pictures who later withdrew, necessitating the producers Gemini Film Circuit to distribute the film themselves.

=== Reception ===
Pavithra Srinivasan from Rediff.com gave the film 2.5 out of 5, claiming that the film is a "fun ride" and despite seeming to be the "same old story" with a "predictable end", he adds, "you're glued to the screen because of the intriguing plot twists". Sify describes the film as a "clean entertainer", citing that the film works "as it is a clean, honest, romantic musical that's worth a matinee for the family audiences", though it isn't "without hiccups" as it "lacks comedy" and could have needed some editing works in the second half. Bhama Devi Ravi from The Times of India also described the film as a "clean entertainer" and praised director Jawahar, citing that he "deserves a round of applause", while criticising the narration that "appears like a lecture students term as 'blade'" and the climax that "has happened in only a 1000 other movies". A critic from The New Indian Express wrote that "Dhanush cruises through the role with easy comfort, and contributes a lot to the humour quotient of the film. A new face would probably have suited and lend some freshness to the role of Gita".

=== Box office ===
The film opened at eleventh place at the Malaysian box office and grossed $110,342 there.
