= Chandra (film) =

2013 Indian film by Roopa Iyer

- Directed by: Roopa Iyer
- Written by: Roopa Iyer
- Produced by: India Classic Arts and Narasimha Arts
- Starring: Shriya Saran; Prem; Ganesh Venkatraman
- Cinematography: P. H. K. Doss
- Edited by: Sri Crazymindz
- Music by: Gautam Srivatsa
- Distributed by: Narasimha Arts
- Release dates: 27 June 2013 (Kannada); 14 February 2014 (Tamil)
- Running time: 117 minutes
- Country: India
- Languages: Kannada; Tamil

Chandra is a 2013 Indian romantic drama film, simultaneously made in Kannada and Tamil languages. Directed by Roopa Iyer, it stars Shriya Saran and Prem. The film deals with the life of a last generation princess and her love story. The film was released on 27 June 2013 to positive reviews and emerged as a success at the Kannada box office. The Tamil version of the film was released on 14 February 2014.

== Plot ==
The story revolves around rajkumari Ammani Chandravathi, a princess, and Chandrahasa a music teacher. The two falls in love with each other. But the princess is engaged to Arya, settled in the US, against her wishes. She is not at all impressed by the US culture and tries to contact Chandrahasa to express her feelings. In another development, Chandrahasa promises his father that he would forget Chandravathi and allow her to marry Arya. But on the wedding day, the story takes a dramatic turn which ends on a happy note.

== Cast ==
- Shriya Saran as Maharani Ammanmani Chandravathy
- Prem as Chandrahasa
- Ganesh Venkatraman as Arya
- Srinath as Maharaja
- Vijayakumar as Guruji Parameshwara
- Vivek as Yuvaraj Sukumar
- Sukanya as Queen Sarala Devi
- Sumithra as Lalitha
- Sadhu Kokila as Andy Roberts
- Cell Murugan as Lekkachara / Kizhakku
- Suchendra Prasad
- R. G. Vijayasarathy
- M. S. Umesh as priest
- Yash as the dancer in the song "Tasse Otthu"/"Raaja Raajan"

== Production ==
=== Development ===
Roopa Iyer developed the films plot after researching the life of former royal families in India to arrive at a subject for her film, focusing on the difficulties faced by their descendants in adapting to life after their estates were taken over by the government. The film incorporates a romantic subplot within this setting.

=== Casting ===
Roopa Iyer had initially considered Ramya for the lead role and even signed her for the lead role. However the actress was dropped from the film later as she was not in good terms with the director and the fact that she skipped Kalaripayattu class required for her role to perform stunts. Following that, various actresses such as Dia Mirza, Amala Paul, Amrita Rao and Aindrita Ray was considered for the role. Then she finalized Shriya Saran as the leading lady. Saran who earlier made her debut in Kannada cinema through Arasu opposite Puneeth Rajkumar in a cameo role immediately accepted the offer after reading the script. Furthermore, actress Ramya Krishnan and singer S. P. Balasubrahmanyam were chosen for a cameo appearance. Prem Kumar played the protagonist in the film. P. H. K. Doss took the spot behind the camera. Yesteryear actors Girish Karnad, Srinath and Sumithra was signed to appear in supporting roles. Ganesh Venkatraman has also been roped in to play the protagonist in this film. Tamil actor Vivek made his Kannada debut.

=== Filming ===
Twenty percent of the shooting was held in USA and rest in India. It was 50 plus days schedule Roopa Iyer had planned for her second direction movie. In Mysore, Bangalore, Rajasthan and Kodagu, Roopa Iyer had chalked out shooting schedules with Mumbai-based Media Networks G.

== Soundtrack ==
=== Kannada ===
Chandra

Soundtrack album by Gautham Srivatsa
- Released: 14 January 2013
- Genre: Feature film soundtrack

No.	Title	Lyrics	Singer(s)	Length
1.	"Mouna Moundadalli"	Roopa Iyer	Sonu Nigam, Anuradha Bhat
2.	"Tasse Otthu"	A. P. Arjun	Tippu
3.	"Dhiranana Dhiranana"	Roopa Iyer	Karthik
4.	"Nee Selave"	Jayanth Kaikini	Anuradha Bhat, Naresh Iyer
5.	"Omkaradalli Jhenkaradalli"	V. Nagendra Prasad	K. S. Chithra, Madhu Balakrishnan

=== Tamil ===
No.	Title	Lyrics	Singer(s)	Length
1.	"Mouna Mounamthil"	Roopa Iyer	Anand, Anuradha Bhat
2.	"Raaja Raajan"	Yugabharathi	M. L. R. Karthikeyan
3.	"Vaanil Ulla"	Roopa Iyer	Ranjith
4.	"Nee Arugey Irukkum"	Yugabharathi	Anuradha Bhat, Naresh Iyer
5.	"Omkaraminum"	Yugabharathi	Badri Prasad, Madhu Balakrishnan, Padmalatha

== Reception ==
=== Critical response ===
A critic from The Times of India scored the film at 3.5 out of 5 stars and says "Shriya Saran for her excellent portrayal of the princess. She impresses with her expression and dialogue delivery. Prem is superb as a music teacher and has given life to his character. Srinath shines as Shriya’s father. Music by Gowtham Srivathsa is impressive. PKH Das has done an excellent work with his camera". A Sharadhaa from The New Indian Express wrote "Music by debutant Gautam Srivatsa adds a classic touch. Cameraman PHK Doss has managed to capture the beauty of Shriya well. The verdict: Shot in a light-hearted manner, with a bright palette of colours, and aided by good performances by the actors, the movie is appealing". B S Srivani from Deccan Herald wrote "Prem and Shriya tease and delight the audience with their expressions and body language. Gautam Srivatsa’s music with evocative lyrics heighten the sense of yearning. All in all, Chandra mesmerises like a full moon but the pleasure wanes in the company of avoidable mistakes". A critic from Bangalore Mirror wrote "The comedy track with two of the best comedians from Kannada and Tamil, Sahdu Kokila and Vivek, falls flat. The slow pace does not help either. The two stars are cinematographer PHK Doss and composer Gautam Srivatsa".
