= Dələli =

- Municipality
- Location within Azerbaijan
- Coordinates: 39°20′27″N 48°17′14″E
- Country: Azerbaijan
- Rayon: Jalilabad

Population
  - Total: 374
- Time zone: UTC+4 (AZT)
  - Summer (DST): UTC+5 (AZT)

Dələli (also, Delali) is a village and municipality in the Jalilabad Rayon of Azerbaijan. It has a population of 374.
