= Shriya Saran =

Indian actress (born 1982)

- Saran in 2024
- Born: 11 September 1982 (age 44); Haridwar, Uttar Pradesh, (now in Uttarakhand), India
- Education: Lady Shri Ram College for Women
- Occupation: Actress
- Years active: 2001–present
- Works: Full list
- Spouse: Andrei Koscheev (m. 2018)
- Children: 1

Shriya Saran Bhatnagar (pronounced [ʃrɪja səɾən]; born 11 September 1982) is an Indian actress who primarily works in Tamil, Telugu and Hindi films. Although Saran aspired to become a dancer, she became an actress and made her film debut with the Telugu film Ishtam (2001). She had her first commercial success with Santosham (2002).

Saran subsequently appeared in several successful Telugu films such as Nenunnanu (2004) and Chatrapathi (2005), alongside Hindi and Tamil films. After marking her Hindi debut with Tujhe Meri Kasam (2003), she gained critical acclaim for her role in Awarapan (2007). Saran marked her Tamil debut with Enakku 20 Unakku 18 (2003) and starred in Sivaji (2007), the highest-grossing Tamil film at that time. In 2008, Saran played the lead role in her first English film, The Other End of the Line. Her following projects included popular films such as Kanthaswamy (2009) in Tamil and Pokkiri Raja (2010) in Malayalam—roles that established her as one of the leading actresses in the South Indian film industries. In 2012, Saran starred in Midnight's Children, an English adaptation of novel of the same name, for which she received international critical acclaim.

Saran achieved further commercial success by starring in films such as Pavitra (2013) and Chandra (2013). In 2014, Saran starred in the critically acclaimed Telugu film Manam, which brought her accolades for her performance. Saran has since been part of critical and commercial successes such as Drishyam (2015), Gautamiputra Satakarni (2017), RRR (2022), Drishyam 2 (2022), and Drishyam: The Conclusion (2026) all co-starring Ajay Devgn.

== Early life ==
Saran was born into a Kayastha family on 11 September 1982 in Haridwar, Uttar Pradesh, (now in Uttarakhand). Her parents are Pushpendra Saran Bhatnagar and Neeraja Saran Bhatnagar. Her father worked for Bharat Heavy Electricals Limited and her mother was a chemistry teacher in Delhi Public School, Ranipur in Haridwar and Delhi Public School, Mathura Road, New Delhi. Saran completed her schooling from both schools where her mother had taught. She has an elder brother named Abhiroop who lives in Mumbai. Saran's mother tongue is Hindi.

Her family lived in the small town of BHEL colony in Haridwar when she was growing up. She later studied at Lady Shri Ram College in Delhi and received a Bachelor of Arts degree in literature.

Saran is an accomplished dancer. She was first trained as a child by her mother in Kathak and Rajasthani folk dance, and later trained in the Kathak style by Shovana Narayan. She was involved with many dance teams in college and with her teacher. They would incorporate social issues into their dance routines.

== Career ==
=== Early career (2001–2003) ===
While in her second year at the LSR College in Delhi, Saran got her first opportunity to appear in front of the camera for a video shoot. Following her dance teacher's recommendation, she was invited to appear in the music video of Renoo Nathan's "Thirakti Kyun Hawa". Shot in Banaras, the video was seen by Ramoji Films which offered her the lead role of Neha in their film Ishtam. Saran accepted the part and, even before it was released she was signed for four more films, including Nuvve Nuvve, in which she played a millionaire's daughter who falls for a middle-class man. In 2002, she starred in Santosham, co-starring Nagarjuna, Prabhu Deva and Gracy Singh, which was her first commercial success.

In 2003, Saran acted in a supporting role in her first Hindi film, Tujhe Meri Kasam, starring debutants Ritesh Deshmukh and Genelia D'Souza in leading roles. She performed as one of the lead female roles in Telugu film Tagore, along with Jyothika and Chiranjeevi which was screened at the International Indian Film Academy Awards, and was a commercial success. She followed it with her Tamil film debut in Enakku 20 Unakku 18, alongside Tarun and Trisha Krishnan, which was simultaneously shot in Telugu as Nee Manasu Naaku Telusu, in which she played a football coach. Though she acted in films in three languages that year, eight of the first ten films of her career were in Telugu.

=== Career fluctuations (2004–2007) ===
In 2004, Saran acted in two Telugu and two Hindi films, including Arjun and Nenunnanu, where she played a student in classical singing. She had ten 2005 releases, nine of which were Telugu films, the most notable for her being Chatrapathi. There she appeared opposite Prabhas and earned her first nomination for the Filmfare Best Telugu Actress Award. Meanwhile, she tried to make her comeback in Tamil with Mazhai, a remake of the Telugu film Varsham, where she reprised the role done by Trisha in the original. The movie was not received well, but Saran was mentioned as the sole positive. Also in 2005, she appeared as one of only three characters in the film Mogudu Pellam O Dongodu, which was about a married couple's first night together, and made a guest appearance in a children's film called Bommalata, which won the National Film Award for Best Feature Film in Telugu. Saran's only lead role in 2006, excluding three special appearances, was in the Tamil film Thiruvilayadal Arambam.

In 2007, she was chosen to play the lead female role opposite Rajinikanth in S. Shankar's Sivaji: The Boss, which was the most expensive Indian film at that time, after Aishwarya Rai rejected the role due to busy schedules. R.G. Vijayasarathy wrote in his review for Rediff.com that, aside from her beauty, Saran "proves that she can act too". Her performance earned her a South Scope Style Award for Best Tamil Actress, her first award win, and a nomination at the Vijay Awards. The role made her a star in the south Indian film industry. During this phase of her career, she made several special appearances in item numbers, including in the films Devadasu, Munna, and Tulasi.

Also in 2007, Saran made her comeback in Hindi cinema with Awarapan, which was a joint production between India and Pakistan. She played a Muslim woman and had to learn Urdu. This was her fourth Hindi film, but the others had failed to make any impact. Sanjay Ram, writing for Business of Cinema, gave the film 2.5 of 5 stars and said that Saran provided a brief, compelling performance. Saran later said that the film strengthened her conviction that all religions are equal. Later that year she appeared in one more Tamil film, Azhagiya Tamil Magan, opposite Vijay. Though critics exalted her looks, her performance received mixed reviews, with one reviewer, Nandhu Sundharam of Rediff, going so far as to say that her "acting is as bad as her looks are good". That same year Saran made a special appearance in a scene in the Kannada film Arasu. She appeared in six films in 2007 in four languages.

=== American cinema debut (2008–2012) ===
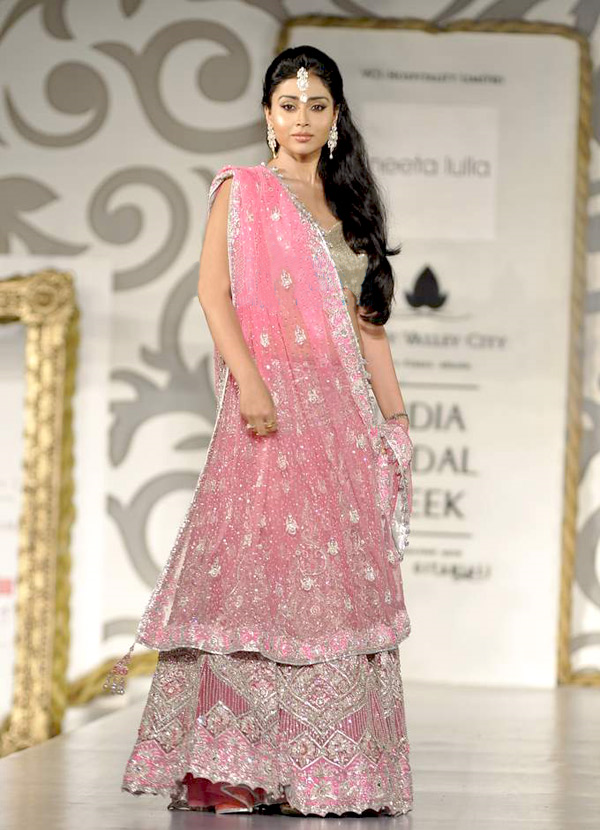
Shriya Saran walks the ramp at the Bridal Fashion Week 2010.

In 2008, Saran made her American cinema debut in Ashok Amritraj's The Other End of the Line. She played the role of Priya Sethi, who works as a telephone operator in an Indian call centre, while acting alongside Jesse Metcalfe, Anupam Kher and Tara Sharma. Shriya's performance was praised by critics, particularly her on-screen chemistry with Jesse Metcalfe. John Anderson, writing for Variety magazine, said it was "a winning Stateside debut for beautiful Indian actress Shriya Saran."

Saran acted in the Hindi film Mission Istaanbul with Zayed Khan, and Shabbir Ahluwalia in 2008. She played the character of Anjali Sagar which was inspired by the character of Romila Dutta played by Preity Zinta in the film Lakshya, a journalist who desires to have a child with her husband, which leads to their separation, since he is reluctant. Bollywood Hungama critics said that her character was wasted, as again she gets very little screen time. However, she did pick up the Stardust Exciting New Face Award.

Her most important 2009 release was the commercially successful Tamil film Kanthaswamy, alongside Vikram. She earned a nomination at the Vijay Awards. Vikram said in an interview that her role was on par with his, and she easily stole the show on most occasions. Of her character in the film, Saran said that it was the best she has done so far. Also that year she appeared as the female lead in Thoranai. A reviewer said that her glamour and the songs were the only high points of the film. For Thoranai and Kanthaswamy together, she received her third award win, the Amrita Mathrubhumi Award for Best Actress. She then appeared in another English film, Cooking with Stella, which is a comedy that takes a look at the serious nature of relationships between servants and employers. It was selected for the Toronto International Film Festival, which Saran attended.

In 2010, Saran made her Malayalam debut with Pokkiri Raja, in which she appeared opposite Mammootty and Prithviraj. The film broke the record in Malayalam cinema for opening week gross income, though it was not received well critically. It was said of Saran that all she had to do was look pretty. She then enacted her first lead role in a Telugu film after five years, in the commercially successful action-comedy Don Seenu opposite Ravi Teja, where she plays the sister of a mobster. In the opinion of some critics, she stole the show with her dances and romantic scenes.

The year 2010 was her second busiest after 2005, having appeared in eight films, this time in four languages.

In 2011, Saran appeared in Rowthiram, where she worked with Tamil actor Jiiva for the first time. The film received fairly low reviews. Although some reviews said that Saran was not given much opportunity to show her acting skills, mainly just adding a romantic touch to a mostly violent film, she was referred to by another as the pivot around which the film revolves. Her performance earned her Best Actress Award at the International Tamil Film Awards. Her only other film in 2011 was a special appearance in a song for the Tamil film Rajapattai.

Saran's first release of 2012 was her second Malayalam project, Casanovva, co-starring Mohanlal and directed by Rosshan Andrrews. The movie was delayed many times, and it was rumoured that Saran would leave the project, but in October 2010, the producer of the film announced that shooting would commence in Dubai with Shriya Saran among the cast. It was released on 26 January. Her next release was in Gali Gali Chor Hai, from director Rumy Jafry, which began shooting in September 2011, and released on 3 February. She then was seen in the critically average comedic Telugu film Nuvva Nena, with actors Allari Naresh and Sharwanand, followed by Sekhar Kammula's much delayed Life is Beautiful.

Saran has starred in Deepa Mehta's long delayed English project Midnight's Children, which is based on Salman Rushdie's highly acclaimed novel of the same name. It was filmed under the working title of Winds of Change. It was screened at several film festivals in late 2012 in Canada and had its general release in India on 1 February 2013.

=== Success and recent work (2013–present) ===
In early 2013, Saran appeared in an item number in the film Zila Ghaziabad. This was her first item number in a Hindi film. On 7 June, Saran's Pavitra was released, in which she played a prostitute. At a press conference in Hyderabad, she said that the film is very special for her, and that she was touched by the sensitivity that director/writer Janardhana Maharshi gave to the topic. Her bi-lingual film Chandra, directed by Roopa Iyer, was simultaneously made in Kannada and Tamil languages. She played the role of a princess in the film opposite Kannada actor Prem Kumar. The film released in Kannada on 27 June 2013, and in Tamil on 14 February 2014. It became a moderate success at the Kannada box office. The film marked Saran's return to Tamil cinema after more than five years.

Saran's first film of 2014, released on 23 May, was the Telugu family drama Manam, which was a success in India and America. Saran's first film of 2015 was Gopala Gopala, a remake of the Bollywood blockbuster OMG – Oh My God!, released in the January festive season. She will next appear in director Karan Bhutani's Hindi film Valmiki Ki Bandook, which is currently under production. She appeared opposite Ajay Devgan in Drishyam, a remake of the Malayalam film of the same name, which turned out to be a box office success. In mid-January 2016, she made a special appearance in Karthi starrer bilingual film Oopiri/Thozha, while also signing for her next Hindi film Tadka, opposite Nana Patekar. In May 2016, she was cast as a female lead in the Telugu-language epic historical action film Gautamiputra Satakarni.

== Off-screen work ==
In 2003, Saran hosted the 50th Filmfare South Award with actor R. Madhavan. She was a part of Tamil director Mani Ratnam's stage show, Netru, Indru, Naalai, an event which sought to raise funds for "Banyan", a voluntary organisation which rehabilitates homeless women with mental illness in Chennai. She was one of the guests alongside actor Surya Sivakumar at the season 3 finale of TV dance show Maanada Mayilada.

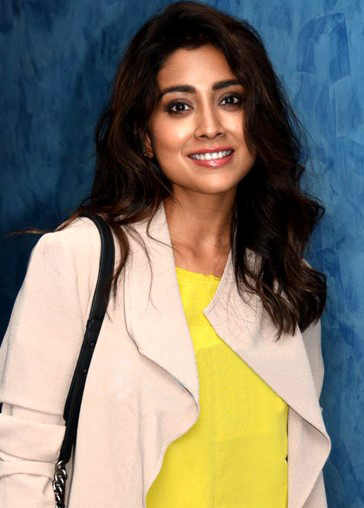
Shriya at LFW 2017

Saran became the first actress, and the third celebrity after Shah Rukh Khan and Aamir Khan to deliver a lecture to students at the Indian Institute of Management Ahmedabad (IIM-A) on 12 February 2010. She said that "The Indian media and entertainment industry is the fastest growing sector at present, so considering this IIM Ahmedabad had started a new program CFI – Contemporary Film Industry – A Business Perspective. I was there to give a lecture to 2nd year students of CFI and did a lot of research for the lecture for nearly five days." She held a lecture on the marketing and branding of a film. In 2011, she gave a lecture to students at the Indian Institutes of Technology (IIT) Madras on the history of films, and films as a medium of cultural exchange.

=== Endorsements ===
Saran started her modelling career by acting in a Pond's Creams advertisement. She then did a Coca-Cola advertisement alongside Tamil actor Vijay, which was directed by prominent director Rajiv Menon. She also starred in a Fair & Lovely creams advertisement during her early career. Shriya Saran is also appointed as brand ambassador for Pantene Shampoo. In 2007, she became the brand ambassador of Saravana Stores. She is now the brand ambassador of the Lux and Head & Shoulders. Saran was also signed as brand ambassador along with actor Saif Ali Khan for Brooke Bond Taj Mahal Tea. Saran says no to soft drinks advertisements because she feels that soft drinks may harm children's health. In 2011, Saran was appointed as the promotional model for McVitie's by United Biscuits along with actress Bipasha Basu. In 2013, Saran was appointed as brand ambassador for Colgate Active Salt Healthy White toothpaste, along with Bollywood actress Kareena Kapoor. In 2014, she was signed as brand ambassador for Karnataka Milk Federation(KMF).

In 2007, Saran launched the first issue of Galatta Cinema and has been featured on its cover many times. In 2008, she was featured in, and appeared on the cover of the June issue of Maxim India. Editor Anup Kutty said: "We had been thinking of getting someone who bridges this strange divide we have between the North, South and the West ... Shreya fit the bill perfectly." She has appeared on various other magazine covers over the years, including Jade and South Scope. In 2012, she again did a photo shoot for Maxim India.

=== CCL (Celebrity Cricket League) ===
On the sports front, Saran is brand ambassador of Celebrity Cricket League (CCL), a concept that mixes two passions in India, film and cricket. In April 2011, she danced with Shah Rukh Khan at the fourth season opening ceremony of the Indian Premier League (IPL), another cricket league.

== Personal life ==
Saran has always been very reluctant to talk about her private life, and usually denied that reported linkups are romantic in nature. Saran is well known for her charity work. She describes herself as someone used to "sharing time and resources with the underprivileged since childhood." She says that "celebrities can show the way by sensitising people to social issues, campaigning for causes or being part of fund-raisers." Her family has always encouraged her to think of the needy.

Saran is a brand ambassador for the Naandi Foundation, and for the Save A Child's Heart Foundation (SACH), which works for the benefit of poor children and people affected by natural calamities. She helps finance a Prevention of Aids foundation. In 2009, Saran joined with other eminent personalities to promote 'The Joy of Giving Week', to encourage people from all walks of life to engage in acts of giving. She regularly participates in carnivals and campaigns that associate with children benefits. She is associated with animal welfare and the Blue Cross of India. She is also associated with an NGO called World Vision that finds parents for deprived kids, and works for Apollo's RDF to raise funds for underprivileged children.

In 2011, she opened a Spa which exclusively employs the visually challenged. It is called Shree Spa, and is located in Mumbai. Saran has said "When I studied in DPS Mathura Road in Delhi, there was a school for blind exactly opposite to our school. I used to go there every week and spend time seeing how these students played cricket and did other things normally. That is what inspired me to do something for these people". In an interview to TOI, the actress said: "We feel sympathetic towards them, but we never employ them. We are scared because we have not grown up with them. While these people might be visually impaired, their other senses are very strong. So they can effectively give foot and back massages and treatments like reflexology. It's important to understand that you are not doing a favour on them but they are doing a favour on you".

On 19 March 2018, she married her Russian boyfriend Andrei Koscheev at her Lokhandwala residence. On 10 January 2021, the couple welcomed a daughter named Radha Saran Koscheev. She is fluent in Hindi, English, and can understand Telugu and Tamil well. According to Saran, the couple chose to include both "Saran" and "Koscheev" in their daughter's name after Koscheev suggested that their daughter should also bear Saran's surname in recognition of her carrying and giving birth to their daughter.

== In the media ==
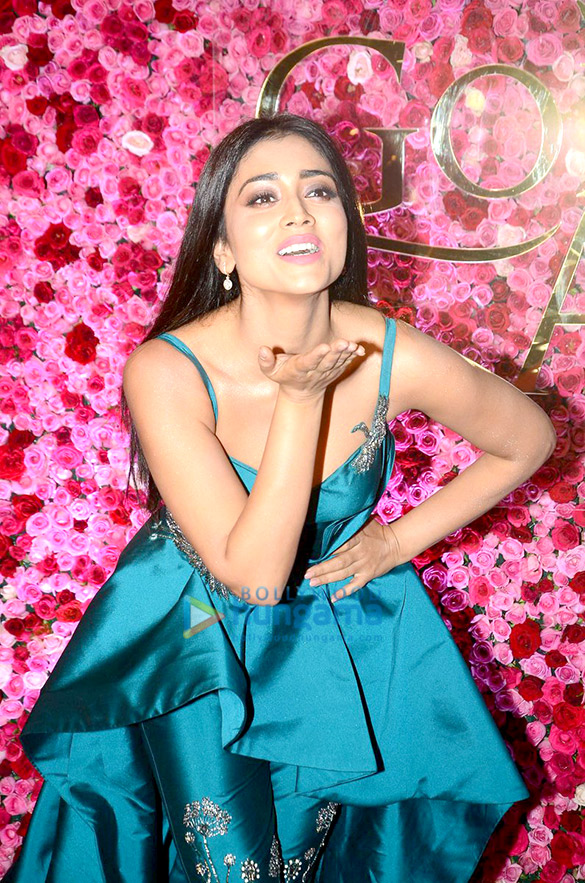
Saran in 2016

Saran is widely known for her work in different industries, mainly Telugu and Tamil films.In January 2008, Saran faced criticism over the attire she wore at the silver jubilee celebration of Sivaji: The Boss. The Hindu Makkal Katchi filed a police complaint alleging that her attire had offended Hindu culture. Saran later issued a public apology, stating that she had not intended to hurt public sentiments. In 2010, Rediff.com placed her in their "Reigning women achievers" in Indian cinema list and said, "Shriya is one of the most in-demand actresses in South Indian industry". Rahul Nanda of Filmfare termed her a "showbiz siren" who has "more than three dozen films" in South Indian and Hindi cinema to her credit. The Telegraph said, "Gorgeous, elegant and pretty - these sum up the talented actress Shriya Saran." Zaral Shah of Verve noted, "Shriya is a star who has earned her share of the spotlight and continues to live life on her own terms."

On working in different language film industries in India, Saran stated: "I don't consider Kollywood or Bollywood as separate entities. For me, there's only a single category, the Indian film industry, which is extremely rich owing to its diverse genres and languages." On 19 January 2013, she quit Twitter due to derogatory comments from her followers. However, she rejoined Twitter with a new account on 27 January 2015. Saran has frequently appeared in Times' 50 Most Desirable Women list. She ranked 18th in 2012, 7th in 2013, 5th in 2014 and 6th in 2015. In Hyderabad Times' Most Desirable Women list, she was placed 3rd in 2013, 2nd in 2014, 2nd in 2015. Saran was named the brand ambassador for South Indian International Movie Awards in 2013, 2014 and 2015. Saran stood at the 28th place on Forbes India's most influential stars on Instagram in South cinema for the year 2021.

== Awards and nominations ==
Year	Award	Category	Film	Result	Ref.
2005	52nd Filmfare Awards South	Best Actress – Telugu	Nenunnanu	Nominated	
2006	53rd Filmfare Awards South	Best Actress – Telugu	Chhatrapati	Nominated	
2008	2nd Vijay Awards	Favourite Heroine	Sivaji: The Boss	Nominated	
2008	South Scope Style Award	Best Actress - Tamil	Sivaji: The Boss	Won	
2008	Stardust Awards	Breakthrough Performance – Female	Awarapan	Nominated	
2009	Stardust Awards	Exciting New Face	Mission Istaanbul	Won	
2010	4th Vijay Awards	Favourite Heroine	Kanthaswamy	Nominated	
2010	Amrita Mathrubhumi Award	Best Actress	Kanthaswamy	Won	
2010	TSR Lalitha Kala Parishath Awards	Contributions to Telugu Cinema	—N/a	Won	
2011	International Tamil Film Awards	Best Actress	Rowthiram	Won	
2014	GR8! Women Achiever Awards	Excellence in Cinema	—N/a	Won	
2015	62nd Filmfare Awards South	Best Supporting Actress – Telugu	Manam	Nominated	
2015	TSR TV9 National Film Awards	Best Actress	Manam	Won	
2015	4th South Indian International Movie Awards	Best Supporting Actress – Telugu	Manam	Won	
2015	13th Santosham Film Awards	Best Actress	Manam	Won	
2016	TSR TV9 National Film Awards	Best Actress	Gopala Gopala	Won	
2018	16th Santosham Film Awards	Best Actress	Gautamiputra Satakarni	Won	
2019	17th Santosham Film Awards	Santosham Sridevi Smarakam Award	—N/a	Won	
2024	22nd Santosham Film Awards	Best Actress – Kannada	Kabzaa	Won	
2026	14th South Indian International Movie Awards	25 years in Indian cinema	—N/a	Won	
