= The Other End of the Line =

2008 film by James Dodson

- Theatrical poster
- Directed by: James Dodson
- Written by: Tracey Jackson
- Produced by: Ashok Amritraj; Patrick Aiello
- Starring: Jesse Metcalfe; Shriya Saran; Anupam Kher; Tara Sharma; Larry Miller; Sara Foster; Resh Ballam
- Cinematography: Harlan Bosmajian
- Edited by: Ethan Maniquis
- Music by: BC Smith
- Production companies: Metro-Goldwyn-Mayer Pictures; Hyde Park Entertainment; Adlabs
- Distributed by: MGM Distribution Co.
- Release date: October 31, 2008
- Running time: 106 minutes
- Countries: India; United States
- Languages: English; Hindi
- Budget: $2.5 million
- Box office: $507,534

The Other End of the Line is a 2008 romantic comedy-drama film starring Jesse Metcalfe, Shriya Saran and Anupam Kher. James Dodson directed the project. The film is based on an employee at an Indian call-center who travels to San Francisco to be with a guy she falls for over the phone. The tagline is "Two countries. Two cultures. One chance at love."

It is the first combination between the Indian powerhouse production house, Adlabs with their American counterpart Metro-Goldwyn-Mayer Pictures. The film was co-produced by the Indian-American producer Ashok Amritraj and Patrick Aiello. It was a low-budget film, which reportedly cost $2.5 million.

Filming began in October 2007 in Mumbai, and continued in San Francisco during 2008. The film was released on October 31, 2008.

== Plot ==
Priya Sethi (Shriya Saran) indulges her infatuation with American culture by working nights at a call center in Mumbai. Speaking in a perfect American English accent, she tells her customers her name is "Jennifer David" and a native of San Francisco. Her conservative father, Rajeev (Anupam Kher), is unhappy that she is so eager to forsake her own culture for another, but will be pleased when she goes through with her arranged marriage to wealthy but childish Vikram.

Priya, posing as Jennifer David, happens to call the handsome and charming Granger Woodruff (Jesse Metcalfe) to help him with the fraudulent charges on his credit card. Priya and Granger have an instant connection over the phone. Unable to suppress the intrigue, Priya agrees to meet Granger in San Francisco. When Priya goes to the meeting place, he doesn't recognize her. As she is attempting to check out of the hotel, they meet by chance, but Priya does not tell him that she is Jennifer. They immediately hit it off and he invites her out to dinner. Priya and Granger's relationship blossoms as they share a romantic date the following day.

However, Priya's family has arrived to bring their wayward daughter home. Granger feels guilty for having abandoned Jennifer David for Priya instead, but still doesn't know that Priya and Jennifer are the same person.

Eventually, Priya and Granger are found out by her parents and he learns that Priya is actually Jennifer David, and also that she is engaged to Vikram. He is angry that she deceived him, and decides to cut their ties. All of Priya's family is happy that the relationship has ended, except for her 80-year-old aunt who advises her that life is too short to live and only make others happy. Priya goes to Granger's hotel but is shattered when she finds his previous girlfriend Emory in the hotel room with him.

Back in India, Priya can't bring herself to accept a lackluster life with Vikram. As she struggles to disengage without hurting, her father stands up for her, points out that whenever she enters a room, people smile, and that he loves her.

Granger, too, feels something is missing. While giving the traditional best man's toast at a wedding, he quotes the groom, his childhood best friend: "Nothing should ever hold a man back from his future." He realizes what he may still be able to save. He rushes to the airport, furiously calling the bank in Mumbai with the help of a Hindi-speaking cab driver.

Priya has thrown herself back into her work, accepting a promotion to help her coworkers become as effective as she is channeling American attitudes and accent. Just as she is counseling a young man to control his emotions to better serve the bank and its customers, Granger strides into Priya's call center and cautiously declares his devotion. With a hundred eyes on the couple, a coworker coaxes, "Kiss him! Kiss him!" They kiss for the first time to the cheers of her crew.

After her shift, the couple finds her family enjoying an open-air breakfast in their garden. Granger bravely attempts to win the approval of Priya's father by promising to honor her and her culture. Granger formally repeats his commitment to respect and care for her. Rajeev thinks this over for a few moments as the family watches him intently, and he graciously accepts the young man, welcoming him to breakfast.

== Cast ==
- Jesse Metcalfe as Granger Woodruff
- Shriya Saran as Priya R. Sethi
- Anupam Kher as Rajeev Sethi
- Larry Miller as Kit Hawksin
- Nouva Monika Wahlgren as Ula
- Sara Foster as Emory Banks
- Tara Sharma as Zia
- Sushmita Mukherjee as Manju R. Sethi
- Jai Thade as Govinda R. Sethi
- Kiran Juneja as Aunt Pimmi
- Suhita Thatte as Priya's Aunt #2
- Ali Fazal as Vij

== Critical reception ==
On Rotten Tomatoes, the film has a score of 35% based on 20 critic reviews, with an average rating of 4.9/10.

== Box office ==
Overall box office gross was US$507,534.

Opening Weekend

- $59,078 (USA) (2 November 2008) (91 Screens, limited release)
