= Mogudu Pellam O Dongodu =

- Directed by: Venky
- Written by: Venky; Marudhuri Raja (dialogues)
- Produced by: Vakada Anjan Kumar
- Starring: Raja; Shriya Saran; Brahmanandam
- Cinematography: Vasu
- Music by: Kabuli
- Release date: 7 September 2005
- Country: India
- Language: Telugu

Mogudu Pellam O Dongodu (transl. Husband, wife, and a thief) is a 2005 Telugu film directed by Venky. The film has only 3 characters featured onscreen, which makes it different from the other films of its time.

== Plot ==
Sri Rama Chandra Murthy (Raja) weds Satyabhama (Shriya Saran) after falling in love. Murthy is an NRI and Satyabhama is a well-educated village girl. During their first night, Satyabhama enters the room at 10 P.M. and tells him that their grandmother advised that they cannot meet until midnight as the muhurtham is at 12 A.M. Both of them will be eagerly waiting for the clock to tick 12. A first-time thief (Brahmanandam) enters the room at 11 P.M. when there was a power cut without the knowledge of the couple. Satyabhama locks the door and keeps the key with her so that no thief can enter inside without knowing the fact that the thief was already in their bedroom. While trying to steal things in the bedroom, the thief tries to escape out of the room by snatching the key from Satyabhama. While spending time talking to each other, Murthy gets angry when he got to know at 11.30 P.M. that Satyabhama lied about muhurtham just because she wanted to spend some time talking. Then, comes the climax where the thief comes out and solves their fight. The thief escapes and the story ends with the couple becoming one.

== Cast ==
- Raja as Sri Rama Chandra Murthy (Husband)
- Shriya Saran as Satyabhama M.A. M.Phil. (Wife)
- Brahmanandam as Thief
- Rama Prabha (voice)

== Soundtrack ==
Mogudu Pellam O Dongodu

Soundtrack album by Kabuli
- Released: 23 June 2005
- Genre: Feature film soundtrack
- Length: 17:58
- Language: Telugu
- Label: Aditya Music
External audio
- Mogudu Pellam O Dongodu – Jukebox on YouTube

The soundtrack was composed by Kabuli, with lyrics written by Chandrabose, Peddada Murthy, and Sahithi.

Track listing
No.	Title	Lyrics	Singer(s)	Length
1.	"Sata Koti Manmadha"	Chandrabose	Nithyasree Mahadevan	4:31
2.	"Chilipi Alaka"	Peddada Murthy	K. S. Chithra	4:26
3.	"Vayyari Bhama"	Sahithi	Devan, Sumangali	4:44
4.	"Sayyandhi Satyabhama"	Peddada Murthy	Karthik, Nitya Santhoshini	4:17
Total length:				17:58

== Reception ==
Jeevi of Idlebrain rated the film two-and-a-half out of five stars and wrote, "This film also makes you feel bored at times, because there is only one thread in the narrative. The plus points of the film are cast and music. The negative point is uninteresting screenplay."
