= John Charles Upton Jr. =

American documentary film maker

John Charles Upton Jr. was an American documentary film maker. In 1990, he won an Emmy Award. During the 1990s, he helped bring 12 Romanian orphans into the United States for adoption or medical treatment. On 28 March 2013, Upton was found murdered by gunfire in the yard of his home in Encinitas, California. Michael Vilkin, the accused killer, said to law enforcement that the pair had a late-night argument over trimming of shrubs. His brother, Michael Upton, said the pair previously argued about trees.

In March 2015, Michael Vilkin was convicted last of first-degree murder and sentenced to 64 years to life in prison.
