= Uthamaputhiran (2010 film) =

- Theatrical release poster
- Directed by: Mithran R. Jawahar
- Screenplay by: Gopimohan; Kona Venkat
- Based on: Ready (2008) by Srinu Vaitla by
- Produced by: M. Mohan Apparao; T. Ramesh
- Starring: Dhanush; Genelia
- Cinematography: Balasubramaniem
- Edited by: M. Thiyagarajan
- Music by: Vijay Antony
- Production company: Balaji Studios
- Distributed by: Ayngaran International; Balaji Studios
- Release date: 5 November 2010
- Running time: 179 minutes
- Country: India
- Language: Tamil

Uthamaputhiran (transl. Ideal Son) is a 2010 Indian Tamil-language romantic action comedy film directed by Mithran R. Jawahar. It is a remake of the 2008 Telugu film Ready. The film stars Dhanush and Genelia, reprising her role from the original version; the supporting cast includes Vivek, K. Bhagyaraj, Ashish Vidyarthi and Jaya Prakash Reddy (who was also part of the original film), with Shriya Saran in a cameo. The film received mixed to positive reviews from critics, ended up as a commercial success among 2010 Deepavali releases along with Mynaa.

== Plot ==
Siva (Dhanush) is a happy-go-lucky young boy in a large family. The heads of this family are three brothers: Raghupathi (K. Bhagyaraj), Raghavan (Vijay Babu), and Rajaram (Vivekvasu Nagalla). Siva is the son of the second brother, Raghavan. Siva studies away from home and lives at a hostel. He is always helpful and always comes through when others need him. In one of his obliging acts, he helps his cousin Kalpana (Shriya Saran) elope with her lover against the family's choice. This aggravates the family, and they are asked to forget all about him.

On another occasion, he is asked to help a friend in a love marriage. Siva kidnaps Pooja (Genelia) on a mistaken identity from the marriage hall. When Pooja is kidnapped, her uncles Periyamuthu Gounder (Ashish Vidyarthi) and Chinnamuthu Gounder (Jaya Prakash Reddy) and their henchmen follow them. Pooja, while on the run, tells Siva that she was not interested in the wedding and that her uncles are forcing her marriage with one of their sons, only to seize her property. When Siva went to kidnap her, she was thinking of how to run away from this marriage. While escaping from Pooja's uncles, Siva brings Pooja to his house under a false identity. Soon, Siva falls in love with Pooja and determines to marry her only with the consent of all the members of both families. When Siva's family along with Pooja visit a temple, her uncle kidnaps her and locks her away in his house.

To save Pooja, Siva joins Emotional Ekambaram (Vivek) – the auditor of Pooja's uncles – as an assistant. He makes Ekambaram believe that he is capable of creating new worlds with characters of their own. Ekambaram then "creates" two American billionaires and with the help of Siva, convinces the two uncles to marry their sons to the daughters of these billionaires. To prove that they are real and not merely the figment of Ekambaram's imagination, Siva asks his parents and his uncles and aunts to play the role. They manage to win the Gounders' hearts and bring about a change in their behavior.

Then, with the consent of all the family members, Siva and Pooja get married.

== Cast ==
- Dhanush as Sivaramakrishnan / Dhandapani
- Genelia as Pooja Padmanabhan (Voice dubbed by Savitha Reddy)
- Vivek as 'Emotional' Ekambaram (Auditor)
- K. Bhagyaraj as Raghupathi / (Washington Vetrivel)
- Ashish Vidyarthi as Periyamuthu Gounder
- Jaya Prakash Reddy as Chinnamuthu Gounder
- Sundarrajan as Sundaram, Siva’s uncle
- Karunas as Janaki
- Vijay Babu as Raghavan / (Chicago Shakthivel)
- Vivekvasu Nagalla as Rajaram
- Charuhasan as Swamiji
- Mayilsamy as Santhosh Khan
- Srinath as David
- Rajendran as Velu
- Ambika as Sivakaami, Periyamuthu’s wife
- Rekha as Meenakshi, Chinnamuthu’s wife
- Rajyalakshmi as Lakshmi Raghupathi
- Nithya as Bharatham Sundaram
- Uma as Sundari Raghavan
- Aarthi as Raji / Gundumani
- Sonia as Lalitha alias Lallu, Ekambaram’s wife
- Pandu as Swamiji's assistant
- Master Bharath as Chinna Moorthy Gounder
- Surekha Vani as Chinna Moorthy Gounder's mother
- Raviraj as Marriage broker
- Rajesh Lingam as Chinna Moorthy Gounder's father
- Shriya Saran as Kalpana (Guest appearance)

== Soundtrack ==
The soundtrack, composed by Vijay Antony, was released on 5 October 2010 in Chennai. Pavithra Srinivasan of Rediff.com wrote, "The biggest drawback of Uthamaputhiran is that there's very little originality in the songs. Practically all of them evoke a certain sense of deja vu, with instrumental arrangements that are simplistic at best. Vijay Antony could have done better".

Track listing
| No. | Title | Lyrics | Singer(s) | Length |
|---|---|---|---|---|
| 1. | "Ussumu Laresay" | Priyan | Vijay Antony, Emcee Jazz, Janaki Iyer | 4:46 |
| 2. | "Kan Irrandil" | Eknaath | Naresh Iyer | 4:29 |
| 3. | "Idicha Pacharisi" | Annamalai | Sangeetha Rajeshwaran, Ranjith, Vinaya | 4:43 |
| 4. | "En Nenju" | Priyan | Vijay Prakash, Saindhavi | 4:47 |
| 5. | "Thooral Thedum" | Priyan | Ajeesh, Janaki Iyer | 4:19 |
| 6. | "Ulagam Unnaku" | Annamalai | Vijay Prakash | 3:36 |
| Total length: | | | | 35:02 |

== Release ==
The film was released on Diwali alongside Vallakottai, Mynaa, and Va. The film netted approximately ₹ 58 lakh in three days from Chennai city and ₹ 67 lakh from Salem area on its opening weekend. It was a successful venture at the box office. The film was however banned in western districts of Tamil Nadu. Upon release, Vivek's dialogues relating to the business community Gounder and scenes pertaining to the community were removed. People of the Kongu caste disrupted the screening of the film as the film made negative remarks against their caste.

== Critical reception ==
A critic from The Times of India wrote that "Though they deliver a feel good and clean family film in Uthamaputhiran (Dhanush and Jawahar), the duo should work on original themes if they want to make good on the promise they displayed in their first film together". A critic from Sify wrote that "Uthamaputhiran is your perfect Diwali outing. Go for it". On the contrary, Pavithra Srinivasan from Rediff.com wrote that "Dhanush's genuinely engaging act and Vivek's antics are the best thing in the movie. Otherwise, Uthamaputhiran is fluffy, frothy, impossibly light and has no business with logic or reason". A critic from Deccan Herald wrote that "Well, Uthama is no Diwali dhamaka (transl. blast) but a damp squib to be safely avoided".
