= Rowthiram =

- Theatrical release poster
- Directed by: Gokul
- Written by: Gokul
- Produced by: R. B. Choudary
- Starring: Jiiva; Shriya Saran
- Cinematography: N. Shanmuga Sundaram
- Edited by: Mathan Gunadeva
- Music by: Songs: Prakash Nikki; Score: Raja
- Production company: Super Good Films
- Distributed by: Telesat Media Matrix Pvt. Ltd
- Release date: 12 August 2011
- Running time: 161 minutes
- Country: India
- Language: Tamil

Rowthiram (transl. Fury) is a 2011 Indian Tamil-language action drama film written and directed by newcomer Gokul. Produced by R. B. Choudary, the film stars his son Jiiva and Shriya Saran, with Sendrayan, Jayaprakash and Lakshmy Ramakrishnan appearing in supporting roles. Dance choreographer Ganesh Acharya also appears in a pivotal role. It released on 12 August 2011.

Upon release, it opened to mixed reviews due to the weak storyline. However, the performances of Jiiva and Saran received praise from the critics and audience, alike. After a few days of the theatrical release, the ending of the film was changed, as per the response of the audience, to a positive one. Saran received an ITFA award in the best actress category.

== Plot ==
The film starts in the 1990s. A young Shiva is trained in the ancient Indian martial art Kalaripayattu by his grandfather to be bold and brave and fight against all odds, especially all that is evil. Shiva grows up with his grandfather's words as his guide. However, Shiva's parents Udaya Murthy and Lakshmi want him to lead a peaceful life. Shiva gets arrested by the police after fighting with a law student named Guna, who is in the gang of the notorious Gowri's . Priya, a law student, is the daughter of a police official. She bails Shiva out and falls for him after seeing him fight for other people's good. Eventually, Shiva too falls for her.

Meanwhile, Guna wants revenge as Shiva had humiliated him in front of everyone. He wants Shiva dead. Things take a turn when Shiva goes to the bus stop with his friend to pick up Ramanujan's (Sathyan) father. There, a couple of rowdies kidnap a young girl. Shiva could not stand this and fights with them. Gowri was one of the rowdies there, and Shiva hits him. Gowri is infuriated and wants Shiva dead at any cost. Shiva's entire family stops talking to him, though he insisted that what he did was for the good. Shiva's sister Kavitha eventually marries Ramanujan, and his brother Ashok marries his longtime love. These marriages happen without Shiva's knowledge, and he becomes shocked and shattered. He packs up and leaves his house since he realises that his presence will only make things dangerous for his family. He takes his grandfather's photo along with him. The lawyer Kavitha helps Shiva escape when he is caught by police.

The climax is when Priya's father and Udaya Murthy convince Shiva to force him out of helping others, ruining his life, and concealing it with danger for him and Priya. Priya's father then receives a message that Gowri was arrested; however he escaped and the police shot him down, to that, Priya's father responded that he will come and see him in the hospital. Shiva travels with Priya's father in a car, where Priya's father advises Shiva to control his anger so that he will get Priya married to him, to which Shiva agrees. Suddenly, they hear a girl's voice. Shiva tries to get out of the car to save the girl. However, Priya's father stops him, asking to control his anger. Shiva could not, and he jumps from the car.

The movie first had a climax where the girl in trouble was Priya and she gets killed by a few rowdies. A few days later, the climax was changed whereby the girl who was dead was someone else, which means that Shiva has not changed his character of trying to help others.

== Cast ==
- Jiiva as Shiva
  - Master Mohit PP as Young Shiva
- Shriya Saran as Priya
- Prakash Raj as Shiva's grandfather
- Jayaprakash as Udaya Murthy, Shiva's father
- Babu Antony as Assistant Commissioner, Priya's father
- Lakshmy Ramakrishnan as Lakshmi, Shiva's mother
- Sathyan as Ramanujan, Shiva's sister's groom
- Srinath as Ashok, Shiva's elder brother
- VJ Monica as Ammu, Shiva's sister
- Ganesh Acharya as Kittu
- Syed as Syed, Gowri's sidekick
- Vinoth Munna as Moorthy, Councillor
- Chaitanya Krishna as Guna
- Sendrayan as Gowri
- Rajendran as Rajendran, a Local goon
- Anandhi Ajay as Priya's friend
- Nandha Saravanan as a Local goon
- Robo Shankar as Kittu's henchman
- Daniel Annie Pope as a Local goon
- Gokul as a local goon (cameo appearance)
- Chinmayi in a cameo appearance

== Production ==
Rowthiram marked the debut of Gokul, music composer Prakash Nikki, and cinematographer Shanmuga Sundaram. As of late 2010, Jiiva started shooting for the film before finishing Ko (2011). The film was shot at real locations instead of sets. Lakshmy Ramakrishnan and Jayaprakash play Jiiva's parents, with the latter's role being subtle, a contrast to his previous fatherly roles. The song "Maalai Mangum Neram" was shot intimately on Jiiva and Shriya Saran in Switzerland and was choreographed by Kalyan.

== Soundtrack ==
Rowthiram

Soundtrack album by Prakash Nikki
- Released: 18 July 2011
- Recorded: 2010–11
- Genre: Film soundtrack
- Length: 22:32
- Label: Star Music

Prakash Nikki chronology
| Rowthiram (2011) | Kalam (2016) |

The soundtrack was composed by Prakash Nikki. It was released on 18 July 2011 in Chennai. The film's re-recording and an extra song in the climax was composed by Mohanji. The Bharatiyar number featured Arabian flute and taiko. The songs of the film particularly "Maalai Mangum Neram" were featured on the top ten of various local Tamil music channels. In a review of the film's soundtrack, Karthik of Milliblog wrote, "Prakash Nikki’s debut is surely endearing, but only within commercially acceptable parameters". In a review of his top listens from July 2011, Karthik wrote, "Maalai [Mangum] neram’s highlight is definitely Ranina Reddy [...] this song, with good picturization, could be her big ticket fame in Tamil! Ideally, I’d have imagined Bombay Jayashree in a song like this, but Ranina does superbly!"

Track listing
| No. | Title | Lyrics | Singer(s) | Length |
|---|---|---|---|---|
| 1. | "Maalai Mangum Neram" | Thamarai | Ranina Reddy | 5:15 |
| 2. | "Golimaare" | Gokul | Vallavan | 4:50 |
| 3. | "Adiye Un Kangal" | Lalithanand | Udit Narayan, Dominic Adiyiah, Harish Raghavendra, Sadhana Sargam | 5:01 |
| 4. | "Senganthal" | Lalithanand | Haricharan | 5:04 |
| 5. | "Theme Music" | Subramania Bharati | Palakkad Sreeram | 2:22 |
| Total length: | | | | 22:32 |

== Release ==
=== Critical reception ===
Pavithra Srinivasan of Rediff gave a score of 2/5 stars and stated that "The problem with most Tamil debutant directors trying to ape trend-setters like Mani Ratnam, Sasikumar, Gautam Menon, etc. is that they faithfully imitate the production values, but end up messing up the characterisations and storyline. And when the end product is also supposed to be an old-fashioned masala in a new tetra-pack, even the fact that the hero is someone who can actually act, can't save it. This is pretty much the problem that afflicts Super Good Films' Rowthiram (Fury), written and directed by Gokul". Malathi Rangarajan from The Hindu said "You understand Gokul's urge to conceive things differently even within the commercial format. But little can be achieved when the narration lacks fizz. And there lies the problem." A critic from IANS gave a score of 2/5 stars and wrote, "Rowthiram has neat presentation and astonishing action sequences. But routine storyline and unjustified length undo the efforts".

Regarding the Telugu dubbed version Roudram in 2012, Karthik Pasupulate of The Times of India rated the film two out of five stars and wrote, "The banal script, lackluster dialogues, mono-chromatic characters and innumerable flaws in the plot just prove to be too much to endure".

=== Box office ===
In the UK the film collected ₹ 10.75 lakhs in two weeks.
