= Pavitra (2013 film) =

- Directed by: Janardhana Maharshi
- Written by: Janardhana Maharshi
- Produced by: K. Sadhak Kumar; G. Maheswara Reddy
- Starring: Shriya Saran; Roja Selvamani; Tanikella Bharani; Saikumar; Kaushik Babu
- Cinematography: V. N. Suresh Kumar
- Edited by: Ramesh
- Music by: M. M. Srilekha
- Distributed by: Aadesh Films
- Release date: 7 June 2013
- Running time: 129 mins
- Country: India
- Language: Telugu

Pavitra is a 2013 Indian Telugu-language adult film directed by Janardhana Maharshi starring Shriya Saran, Roja Selvamani, Tanikella Bharani and Kaushik Babu in pivotal roles. K. Sadhak Kumar and G. Maheswara Reddy produced this film on Aadesh films Banner. The Soundtrack is scored by M.M. Srilekha. Shriya seen in a bold role of a prostitute in this film. Pavitra also released in Tamil and Malayalam.

According to the director, the film is inspired from a real incident where a prostitute, who was humiliated by a politician, goes on to defeat him in an election. Pavitra's audio already making waves amongst music buffs before the film release, the film's platinum disc function was held on 19 May to celebrate the audio success. The film was released on 7 June 2013, to negative reviews and emerged as a box office failure.

== Plot ==
A woman becomes hospitalized due to health problems. Her brother (AVS) is willing to sell one of his kidneys to help her. Before anything happens, the daughter of this woman, an eighteen-year-old girl, Pavitra (Shriya Saran), stops her uncle, saying there has to be another way. When her uncle tells her the only thing she can do is sell her body for money, she says she will do just that. Though there is hesitation from her uncle he gives in to her idea. Pavitra becomes a prostitute in order to save her mother from death, and make sure her uncle does not sell his kidney.

Even though she had paid many lakhs to the hospital, her mother still died. Even after her mother's death, she continued to be a prostitute, having no other thing to do. She makes it a habit of donating blood every few months in the same hospital of her mother's death, once when she is leaving the hospital after donating, she comes in contact with a suicide case. The girl who tried to commit suicide lived because of Pavitra. The reason behind her death attempt, was a man, Siva (Sivaji). Siva is a cruel man who takes advantage of girls and their money. He easily blackmails them with only one camera and a laptop. The girl warns Pavitra not to take revenge for her; however, Pavitra is a strong woman and she decides to blackmail Siva. After a few blackmailing phone calls, not only does Pavitra gain 5 lakhs for herself, the girl, and other girls that Siva cheated, but Siva is also arrested for his wrongdoings.

After this, the second part of the story comes into play. Munna (Kaushik Babu) is a young man who falls in love with Pavitra. He buys her for 30 lakhs, a whole month. Pavitra is shocked. Her shock is raised when she finds out he only paid so that no one else would touch her, and that he wants to marry her. She at first hesitates, but after he claims that even knowing she is a prostitute, his mother (Roja Selvamani) accepted, she also accepts their marriage. Soon after, Pavitra finds out that her new mother in law does not know about her previous job. Pavitra is at first furious with Munna for lying, but then forgives him.

The third part of the story takes place, where Munna's father (Saikumar), who used to be Pavitra's customer at one point, dies. Munna's father was a politician when alive, but after his death, Pavitra decided to take advantage of it, knowing that he was a bad man. Pavitra joins in politics and exposes the wrong whereabouts of Swamy (Ravi Babu), another politician who pretends to be a "baba" but actually is a horrible man and a womanizer. Later, Pavitra goes after some people, for a position as Home Minister, once they say no, saying she is a prostitute, she tells them she had only sold her body, but they are selling the nation. At first there is an argument, and Pavitra is denied, and so she leaves. While leaving the hall, she is shot by none other than Siva, who escaped prison to kill her. After this, while in a position of death, Pavitra delivers a beautiful speech, which touches the hearts of the people who denied her political position. The film ends with Munna and Pavitra being praised by many, and Siva being thrown in jail once again, this time along with the Constable who let him escape.

== Cast ==
- Shriya Saran as Pavitra
- Kaushik Babu as Munna, Pavitra's husband
- Saikumar as Munna's father
- Roja Selvamani as Munna's mother
- Sivaji as Siva
- Ravi Babu as Swamy
- AVS as Pavitra's uncle
- Tanikella Bharani
- Pragathi as Pavitra's mother
- Rani as Munna's aunt
- Nizhalgal Ravi as Dr. Keshav
- Nithya Ravindran as News Anchor

== Soundtrack ==
The soundtrack list was released on Shreyas media YouTube account. The music for was composed by M. M. Srilekha, which was not highly acclaimed, but gave the apt expression for the movies situations. The title track "Pavithra" sung by singer K.S.Chithra proved to be successful. A function marking Pavitra's audio release was held at Hawa Mahal, Visakhapatnam on 6 April 2013. Shriya Saran, Kaushik Babu, MM Srilekha, Saikumar, Janardhana Maharshi, Bellamkonda Suresh, K. Sadhak Kumar, G. Maheshwara Reddy graced the event.

Pavitra (film)

Soundtrack album Pavitra (film) by M. M. Srilekha
- Released: 6 April 2013
- Recorded: 2013
- Genre: Feature film soundtrack
- Language: Telugu
- Label: Shreyas Music
- Producer: M. M. Srilekha

Track Listing
No.	Title	Singer(s)	Length
1.	"Pavithra Title Track"	K. S. Chithra	4:01
2.	"Rara Venu"	Geetha Madhuri	3:43
3.	"Sukumara Raara"	K. S. Chithra	4:05
4.	"Entha Andamo"	Tippu & M. M. Srilekha	3:58
5.	"Dhula Teerinda"	Sri Krishna, Raghu & Dhanunjay Seepana	2:15
