= Ishtam (2001 Telugu film) =

2001 film by Vikram Kumar

- Directed by: Vikram Kumar; Raj Kumar
- Produced by: Ramoji Rao
- Starring: Charan Dodla; Shriya Saran
- Cinematography: V. Srinivasa Reddy
- Edited by: Nandamuri Hari
- Music by: D.J. Gopinath
- Production company: Ushakiran Movies
- Release date: 30 November 2001
- Country: India
- Language: Telugu

Ishtam (Translation: Like) is a 2001 Indian Telugu romantic drama film directed by Vikram Kumar and Raj Kumar. It starred Charan Dodla, and Shriya Saran with Poonam Dhillon and Chandra Mohan in supporting roles.

This is the debut movie of actress Shriya Saran. Charan paired up with Saran for the first time. This was Charan's only film as an actor. He died in 2012 due to a cardiac arrest. The film was released a day after Jabili and had similar ending scenes to that film.

== Plot ==
Karthik (Charan), hailing from a rich family, is quite inept in his academics. Neha (Shriya Saran) is Subbu's (Chandra Mohan) daughter and she's motherless. Karthik is the senior of Neha in the college and rags her quite a bit. When Karthik's mother Lakshmi (Poonam Dhillon) has an accident, Neha rescues and admits her in a hospital. Over time, Lakshmi and Neha become friends and Neha falls in love with Karthik. But when Subbu proposes to get Karthik and Neha married, Lakshmi refuses. The film is about why Lakshmi doesn't accept the marriage, who initially wanted Neha to marry Karthik.

== Cast ==
- Charan Dodla as Karthik / Billa
- Shriya Saran as Neha
- Poonam Dhillon as Lakshmi Chakravarthy, Karthik's mother
- Chandra Mohan as Subrahmanyam "Subbu", Neha's father
- Sarath Babu as Chakravarthy, Karthik's father
- Saraswathamma as Neha's grandmother
- Jayasudha as Neha's mother (photographic appearance)
- Srinivasa Reddy as Ravi, Karthik's friend
- Khayyum as Raghu, Karthik's friend
- Delhi Rajeswari as Raghu's mother
- Shankar Melkote as Dr. Melkote
- Naveen as Gopi
- Sravan as Sravan
- Monal in a special appearance in the song "Yaavuru Yaavure Chinnadaanaa"
- Gundu Sudarshan as College canteen owner
- Jenny as Temple Priest

== Soundtrack ==
The music was composed by D.J. Gopinath and released by Mayuri Audio.

Ishtam

Soundtrack album by D.J. Gopinath
- Released: 2001
- Recorded: 2001
- Genre: Soundtrack
- Length: 36:22
- Label: Mayuri Audio
- Producer: D.J. Gopinath

D.J. Gopinath chronology
| Ishtam (2001) | Nugam (2013) |

Track list
| No. | Title | Lyrics | Singer(s) | Length |
|---|---|---|---|---|
| 1. | "Nuvvante Ishtamani" | Sirivennela Seetarama Sastry | K. S. Chithra, Hariharan | 4:58 |
| 2. | "Ee Andala Collegelo" | Pothula Ravi Kiran | Tippu | 5:15 |
| 3. | "Evaraina Chusara" | Sirivennela Seetarama Sastry | K. S. Chithra, Hariharan | 5:10 |
| 4. | "Why Don't You Enjoy" | Kulasekhar | T. R. Karthik | 5:41 |
| 5. | "Conventulo Collegelo" | Sirivennela Seetarama Sastry | S. P. Balasubrahmanyam | 5:19 |
| 6. | "Yaavuru Yaavure Chinnadaanaa" | Varikuppala Yadagiri | Varikuppala Yadagiri | 5:35 |
| 7. | "Chiru Chiru Nagavula" | Bhuvana Chandra | K. S. Chithra | 4:24 |
| Total length: | | | | 36:22 |

== Reception ==
Jeevi of Idlebrain.com wrote that "The film has got good music, photography, direction etc. But what this film terribly lacks is the entertainment value. In addition to this, there is a[n] overdose of sentiment for this film". A critic from The Hindu wrote that "Though the dramatic tempo has many ups and downs, the film turns out to be an enjoyable exercise, with refreshing music score by Gopinath". A critic from Full Hyderabad wrote that "In the end, worth watching if all you have to do is to sit up with a sick ant. Moreover, there aren't any good Telugu movies around as I write this".
