= Applied Organometallic Chemistry =

Peer-reviewed scientific journal

- Discipline: Chemistry
- Language: English
- Edited by: Cornelis J. Elsevier

Publication details
- History: 1987–present
- Publisher: John Wiley & Sons
- Frequency: Monthly
- Impact factor: 4.105 (2020)

Standard abbreviations
- ISO 4: Appl. Organomet. Chem.

Indexing
- CODEN: AOCHEX
- ISSN: 1099-0739
- LCCN: 91649235
- OCLC no.: 15586837

Links
- Journal homepage; Online access; Online archive

Applied Organometallic Chemistry is a monthly peer-reviewed scientific journal published since 1987 by John Wiley & Sons. The editor-in-chief is Cornelis J. Elsevier (University of Amsterdam).

== Contents ==
The journal includes:

- reviews
- full papers
- communications
- working methods papers
- crystallographic reports

It also includes occasional reports on:

- relevant conferences of applied work in the field of organometallics
- including bioorganometallic chemistry
- metal/organic ligand coordination chemistry.

== Abstracting and indexing ==
The journal is abstracted and indexed in:

- Biological Abstracts
- BIOSIS Previews
- Cambridge Structural Database
- Chemical Abstracts Service
- Ceramic Abstracts
- ChemWeb
- Compendex
- Advanced Polymer Abstracts
- Civil Engineering Abstracts
- Mechanical & Transportation Engineering Abstracts
- Current Contents/Physical
- Chemical & Earth Sciences
- Engineered Materials Abstracts
- International Aerospace Abstracts
- METADEX
- PASCAL
- Science Citation Index
- Scopus

According to the Journal Citation Reports, the journal has a 2020 impact factor of 4.105.

== Most cited papers ==
The three highest cited papers (> 250 citations each) are:

- Tiekink, E.R.T. (1991). "Structural chemistry of organotin carboxylates: a review of the crystallographic literature". Applied Organometallic Chemistry. 5: 1–23. doi:10.1002/aoc.590050102.
- Giannelis, E.P. (1998). "Polymer-layered silicate nanocomposites: Synthesis, properties and applications" (PDF). Applied Organometallic Chemistry. 12 (10–11): 675–680. doi:10.1002/(SICI)1099-0739(199810/11)12:10/11<675::AID-AOC779>3.0.CO;2-V. hdl:2027.42/38308.
- Gielen, M. (2002). "Review: Organotin compounds and their therapeutic potential: a report from the Organometallic Chemistry Department of the Free University of Brussels". Applied Organometallic Chemistry. 16 (9): 481–494. doi:10.1002/aoc.331.
