= Roopa Iyer =

Indian actor and film director

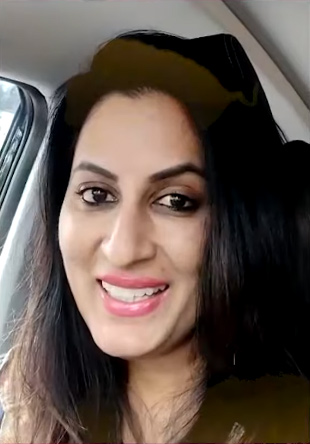
- Born: 24 July 1982 (age 44); Belakavadi, Mandya, Karnataka, India
- Occupations: Film director, actor
- Spouse: Gautam Srivatsa (m. 2014)

Roopa Iyer is a film director and actor.

== Career ==
She played the lead actress in the movie Daatu. She directed and wrote the movie Mukhaputa. In 2013, she directed & produced her bilingual big budget film Chandra in Kannada and Tamil.

== Filmography ==
- Note: All films are in Kannada unless otherwise noted.

Year	Film	Director	Producer	Screenwriter	Actor	Role	Notes
2007	Daatu	No	No	No	Yes		
2010	Mukhaputa	Yes	No	Yes	Yes	Gowri	
2013	Chandra	Yes	Yes	Yes	No		Simultaneously shot in Tamil
2026	Azad Bharath	Yes	Yes	Yes	Yes	Neera Arya	Hindi film

== Sources ==
- "Kannada star Roopa Iyer making film on HIV positive kids". Hindustan Times. 9 March 2009. Archived from the original on 5 June 2011.
- Bringing Modi on screen The Hindu
