= Santosh Subramaniam =

2008 film by M. Raja

- Theatrical poster
- Directed by: M. Raja
- Screenplay by: M. Raja
- Based on: Bommarillu by Bhaskar
- Produced by: Kalpathi S. Aghoram; Kalpathi S. Ganesh; Kalpathi S. Suresh
- Starring: Ravi Mohan; Genelia; Prakash Raj
- Narrated by: Sathyaraj
- Cinematography: D. Kannan
- Edited by: A. Mohan
- Music by: Devi Sri Prasad
- Production company: AGS Entertainment
- Release date: 11 April 2008
- Country: India
- Language: Tamil

Santosh Subramaniam (spelt Santhosh Subramaniyam onscreen) is a 2008 Indian Tamil-language romantic comedy film directed by M. Raja and produced by Kalpathi S. Agoram. The film stars Ravi Mohan (credited as Jayam Ravi) and Genelia while Prakash Raj, Geetha and Sayaji Shinde play supporting roles. It is a remake of the Telugu film, Bommarillu (2006). Genelia and Raj reprise their roles in the film, which revolves around a father and son relationship; the father dotes on his son, who resents the same. The son's choices and his ambitions to achieve something in life are subdued by his father.

Santosh Subramaniam was released on 11 April 2008 during the Tamil New Year festival. The film was positively received and commercially successful; critics praised the performances of Ravi, Genelia and Prakash Raj. It won the third prize for the Best Film at the Tamil Nadu State Film Awards of 2008. It was nominated for four awards at the 56th Filmfare Awards South, including Best Film, Best Director, Best Actor and Best Actress, but did not win in any category.

== Plot ==
Subramaniam is a rich businessman managing his own construction company. He lives with his wife Shanthi and sons Sanjay and Santosh. Subramaniam cares for his family a lot and excessively dotes on his children. Santosh, the younger son, does not like this as he wants to be independent and free from his father's guidance and control, but he acts normally to avoid hurting his father. Santosh has in mind that both his career and wife should be of his choice only and not of his father's. Subramaniam wants Santosh to assist him in managing the company, but Santosh dreams of starting a new company on his own and does not prefer to work in his father's company. Meanwhile, Subramaniam arranges Santosh's wedding with Rajeshwari, the daughter of his friend Ramamoorthy. Santosh is shocked as he has no other option rather than agreeing for this wedding.

One day, Santosh meets Hasini, a college student, and is immediately attracted to her childish attitude and jovial nature. Santosh slowly befriends Hasini, and both fall in love, but he does not dare to inform his love to his father. Santosh gets spotted along with Hasini by Subramaniam, and now he reveals his love affair. Subramaniam is furious upon hearing this, as Santosh is already engaged to Rajeshwari. Subramaniam asks Santosh to bring Hasini to his home and make her stay with them for a week so that he will make Santosh understand that Rajeshwari is the better bride for him. Santosh agrees, believing that Hasini will impress Subramaniam. Hasini lies to her father Govindan that she is going for a college trip and leaves for Santosh's home.

Everyone at Subramaniam's home views Hasini indifferently, seeing her talkative nature compared to Subramaniam's family members, who are more mature and not as talkative, especially Subramaniam. Santosh asks Hasini to try impressing his family members, fearing Subramaniam might not accept her for the wedding. Slowly, Hasini starts befriending Santosh's mother and sisters and gets close with them. Hasini informs them about Santosh's behavior, such as alcohol consumption, going out at night to meet her, and his plans of getting a bank loan to start his own company, which were not known to Santosh's family before.

Santosh is shocked to know that Hasini has revealed all his mischievous activities and berates her often for being childish. Hasini worries and decides to leave Santosh's home even before the one week given to her. She apologises to everyone in Santosh's home and says that she is not the one fit for him and his family. Santosh is worried seeing this but has no option but to stay calm, as even Subramaniam did not like Hasini.

The next day, an argument erupts between Santosh and Subramaniam during which the former becomes emotional and shouts that he has lost so many small things in life because of Subramaniam. But he preferred to stay calm as he did not want to hurt his father. Subramaniam realises his mistake and apologises to everyone, saying that he always wanted to take care of his family members so well but had never thought that they were sacrificing a lot to make him happy.

Santosh meets Rajeshwari and apologises to her. He also makes her understand his situation. Rajeshwari convinces Ramamoorthy that she will get a better groom than Santosh. Meanwhile, Subramaniam goes to meet Hasini and apologises to her. Hasini says that her father is angry with her for lying and she will have to obey her father now. But Govindan does not like Santosh as he has seen him before drinking with his friends on the road. Subramaniam says that he will send Santosh to Govindan's home for a week so that he will better understand his character. After numerous comic incidents between Govindan and Santosh, the former finally agrees to Santosh and Hasini's wedding.

== Cast ==
- Ravi Mohan as Santosh Subramaniam
- Genelia (voice: Savitha) as Hasini
- Prakash Raj as Subramaniam, Santosh's father
- Santhanam as Srinivasan
- Prem G. as Shekar
- Srinath as Guna
- Sathyan as Muthu
- Geetha as Shanthi, Santosh's mother
- Kausalya as Santosh's sister
- Kirat as Rajeswari
- M. S. Bhaskar as Kootha Perumal
- Sadagoppan Ramesh as Sanjay
- Vijayakumar as Ramamoorthy
- Sayaji Shinde as Govindan, Hasini's father
- Manobala as the loan officer
- Manikka Vinayagam as Shekar's father
- Pushpavanam Kuppusamy as a father of Santosh's friend
- Raviraj as a father of Santosh's friend
- Sevvalai Rasu as Motorcycle driver
- Anu Hasan (special appearance)
- Neelima Rani as Srinivasan's wife
- Satya Krishnan as Sanjay's wife
- Desikasri as Ammu, Santosh's sister

== Production ==
Despite early indications that the same team that worked on the 2006 Telugu film Bommarillu—including director K. Vijaya Bhaskar and producer Dil Raju—would remake the film in Tamil, the pair said they were not interested. Raju was willing to sell the remake rights and held twenty previews in Chennai for potential buyers. Editor Mohan, under his home company Jayam Combines, outbid Prakash Raj, who wanted to remake the film with Vishal in the lead role. Others outbid included Vijay, K. Bhagyaraj for his daughter, Saranya, and A. M. Rathnam for his son Ravi Krishna. Mohan handed the director's role to his first son Raja, and the lead role to his second son Jayam Ravi. The film would become Raja's fourth consecutive remake of a Telugu film. (Note: All of Raja's previous Tamil films featured Ravi, and were remakes of Telugu films. Jayam (2003) was a remake of the same-titled 2002 Telugu film, M. Kumaran S/O Mahalakshmi (2004) was remade from Amma Nanna O Tamila Ammayi (2003), and Unakkum Enakkum (2006) was a remake of Nuvvostanante Nenoddantana (2005).) Bhaskar stated that he chose not to work on the remake because he had "invested too much time and energy" making the original.

The remake, titled Santosh Subramaniam, had its launch in mid-July 2007 with the attendance of all the lead actors. For the inauguration function, 300 invitations by word of mouth were made. The invitation for the launch featured many successful father-son duos from various fields, such as Sivaji Ganesan and Prabhu, Sivakumar and Suriya, and Sathyaraj and Sibiraj. Genelia D'Souza was chosen to play the female lead Hasini, reprising her role from the original film. Prakash Raj, who also acted in the original film, was chosen to reprise his role as the protagonist's father. Former cricketer Sadagoppan Ramesh made his acting debut in this film, playing Santosh's elder brother. Raja approached Ramesh because he felt he resembled Ravi. Anu Hasan accepted to make a special appearance because she believed that "there is no small role, only small actors". According to Raja, the film was inspired by his own life: "My friend took the essence of my story and made the Telugu blockbuster, which I then remade in Tamil".

== Soundtrack ==
For the film's music and soundtrack, Raja renewed his association with Devi Sri Prasad, (Note: Raja and Devi Sri Prasad had previously worked together in Unakkum Enakkum.) who reused all used his tracks from the original film except for "Bommani Gesthe", which was replaced with "Yeppadi Iruntha En Manasu". Siddharth, the lead actor in the original, sang the number "Adada Adada Adada", making his debut as a playback singer in Tamil cinema. (Note: He had sung the Telugu version of the song in the original.)

Rediff.com rated the album 3 out of 5, and stated that "listening to Santosh Subramaniyam music really gives 'santhosham' (transl. happiness) ". Karthik of Milliblog wrote that "Devi’s melodic streak gets the better of him in Uyire uyire – Sagar carrying this simple, mellow melody beautifully. And while Yeppadi irundha is catchy in the usual Devi sense".

Track listing
No.	Title	Lyrics	Singer(s)	Length
1.	"Senthamizh Pesum Azhagu Juliet"	Pa. Vijay	Ranjith, Andrea Jeremiah	5:13
2.	"Adada Adada Adada"	Na. Muthukumar	Siddharth	4:10
3.	"Kadhaluku Kanngal Illai"	Kavivarman	Devi Sri Prasad	5:20
4.	"Love Theme"	—	Sumangali	0:51
5.	"America Yendralum Aandipatti Yendralum"	Viveka	Naveen, Premgi Amaren, Manikka Vinayagam, Pushpavanam Kuppusamy, Priya Himesh	5:30
6.	"Uyire Uyire Piriyadhey"	Na. Muthukumar	Sagar	4:38
7.	"Yeppadi Iruntha En Manasu"	Viveka	Tippu, Gopika Poornima	4:34
Total length:				30:16

== Release and reception ==
Santosh Subramaniam was released on 11 April 2008 during the Tamil New Year festival. Despite being released during the season of the Indian Premier League, it took a big opening and enjoyed a theatrical run of one hundred days due to positive critical reviews and favourable word of mouth.

=== Box office ===
The reception in the United Kingdom, comparatively for a Tamil film, was equally successful, entering the UK box office at number 40. The film collected £10,067 in its first week of opening and earned a cumulative gross of £24,962 in its three-week box office run.

=== Critical reception ===
Pavithra Srinivasan of Rediff gave the film a rating of two and a half out of five; she called the film a "classy remake of the Telugu blockbuster Bommarillu (Toy-house), the movie is a love-story but it strives to be something even more". She stated that Ravi "performs with his usual flair", D'Souza's character "appears a little too good to be true, at first. But her character grows on you", and praised Prakash Raj's performance, saying that the role "was a cakewalk" for him. Malathi Rangarajan of The Hindu praised the music, locations and the main cast's performances, and wrote that in the film, "dull moments are rare, enjoyable ones aplenty". Sify said D'Souza's portrayal is "the soul of the film" and its "biggest strength"; the reviewer called Ravi's performance "mature" and Prakash Raj's "outstanding".

=== Accolades ===
Award	Category	Nominee	Outcome	Ref.
56th Filmfare Awards South	Best Film	Santosh Subramaniam	Nominated	
56th Filmfare Awards South	Best Director	M. Raja	Nominated	
56th Filmfare Awards South	Best Actor	Jayam Ravi	Nominated	
56th Filmfare Awards South	Best Actress	Genelia D'Souza	Nominated	
Tamil Nadu State Film Awards	Award for Best Feature Film (Third prize)	Santosh Subramaniam	Won	
