= Ravi (name) =

Ravi is a male name. It means 'sun' in Sanskrit, one of the names of Surya, the Sun deity in Hinduism. People with the name include:

== People ==
- Ravi (Ivar Johansen) (born 1976), a Norwegian artist
- Ravi Bharadwaj (born 1992), an Indian basketball player
- Ravi Bopara (born 1985), an English cricketer
- Ravi Hutheesing (born 1971), musician (singer/songwriter, former guitarist of Hanson), aviator, lecturer
- Ravi Kant (disambiguation), several people
- Ravi Madasamy (1969-2025), also known as M Ravi, Singaporean lawyer and activist
- Ravi Namade, Indian film director
- Ravi Chandran Philemon (born 1968), Singaporean politician
- Ravi Shankar (1920–2012), a sitar virtuoso
- Ravi (music director) (1926–2012), an Indian film music director
- Ravi Mohan (born 1980), Indian film actor, director and producer
- Ravi Shankar (spiritual leader) (born 1956), a spiritual leader and founder of the Art of Living Foundation
- Ravi Shastri (born 1962), a former Indian cricketer
- Ravi Sood (born 1976), a Canadian-born financier
- Raja Ravi Varma (1848–1906), also known as Ravi Varma, Indian painter Ravi Varman, Indian cinematographer and filmmaker
- Ravi Zacharias (1946–2020), an Indian-born, Canadian-American evangelical Christian philosopher, apologist and evangelist
- Ravi Teja Bhupatiraju (born 1968), an Indian actor who works mainly in Telugu films
- Ravi (rapper) (born 1993), stage name of Kim Won-sik, a member of the South Korean k-pop boy band VIXX
- Ravi Coltrane (born 1965), American saxophonist and son of John Coltrane
- Ravi Ragbir, Trinidadian American immigration activist
- Ravi Narayana Reddy (1908–1991), founding member of the Communist Party of India and leader in the Telangana Rebellion
- Ravi Jagannathan, economist and professor
- Ravi Pushpakumara (born 1975), Sri Lankan cricketer
- Ravi Ratnayeke (born 1960), Sri Lankan cricketer
- Ravi Cabot-Conyers (born 2011), American actor

== Fictional characters ==
- The in-training bookman in the manga D.Gray-man, also known as "Lavi" or "Rabi"
- Ravi Ross, a character in the Disney Channel TV series Jessie (2011 TV series) and Bunk'd
- Dr. Ravi Chakrabarti, a character from TV series iZombie
- Ravi, a main character in Power Rangers Beast Morphers
- Ravi Panikkar, a recurring character on the first responders show 9-1-1.
- Ravi Singh, a main character in the book series “A Good Girl's Guide to Murder”. Sal Singh’s younger brother and helps Pip Fitz-Amobi solve the Andie Bell case.
- Ravi, a character from the Backrooms Web Series.
- Ravi, a character from the movie Gladiator II. He is a former gladiator from India who earned his freedom and then chose to serve as a doctor to wounded combatants.
- Ravi Patel, a character from the book Life of Pi and the movie adaptation of it.
- Ravi Raso, a character from the Video Game Doki Doki Literature Club Plus! An employee at the fictional corporation Metaverse Enterprise Solutions
