= List of accolades received by Thani Oruvan =

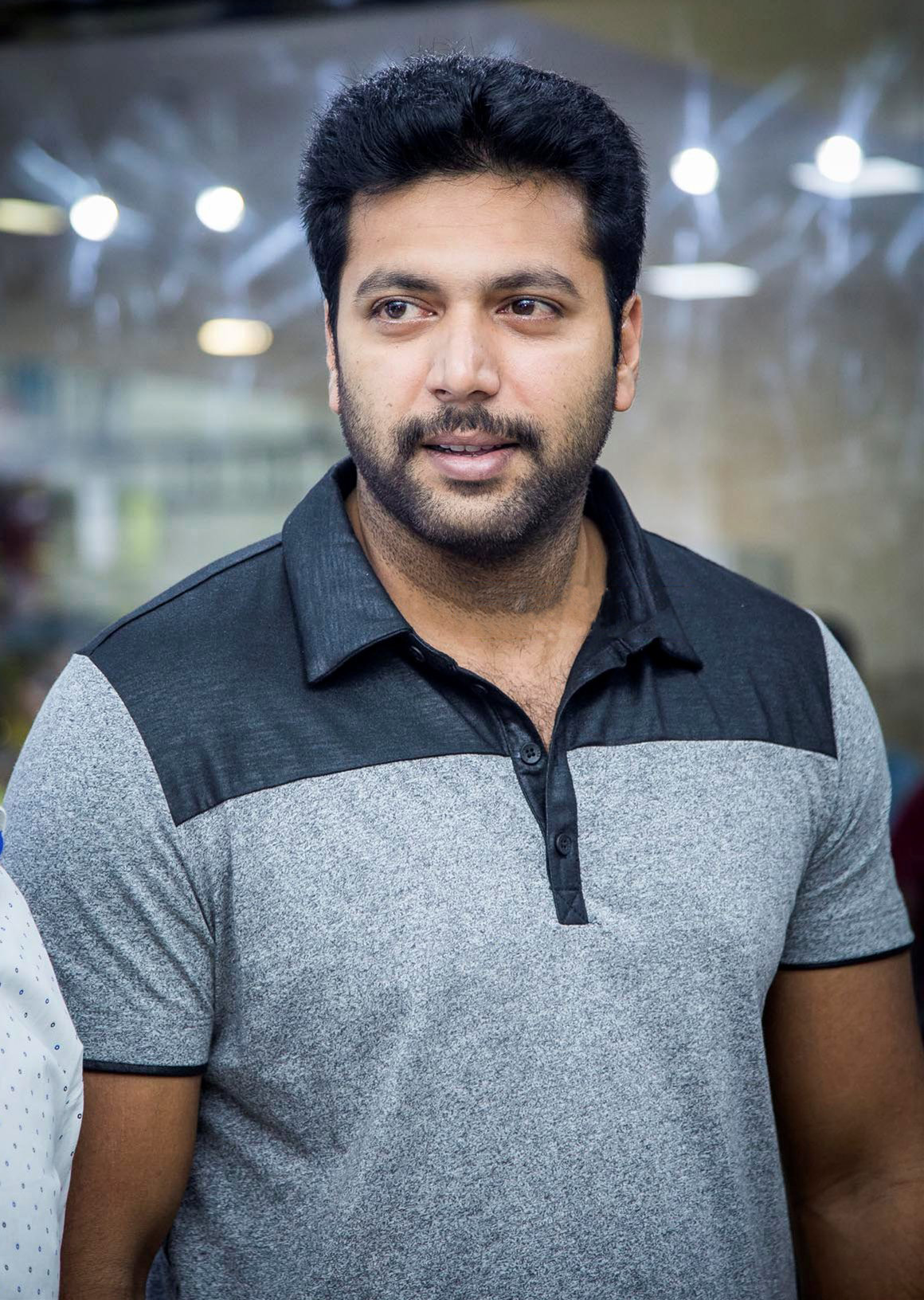
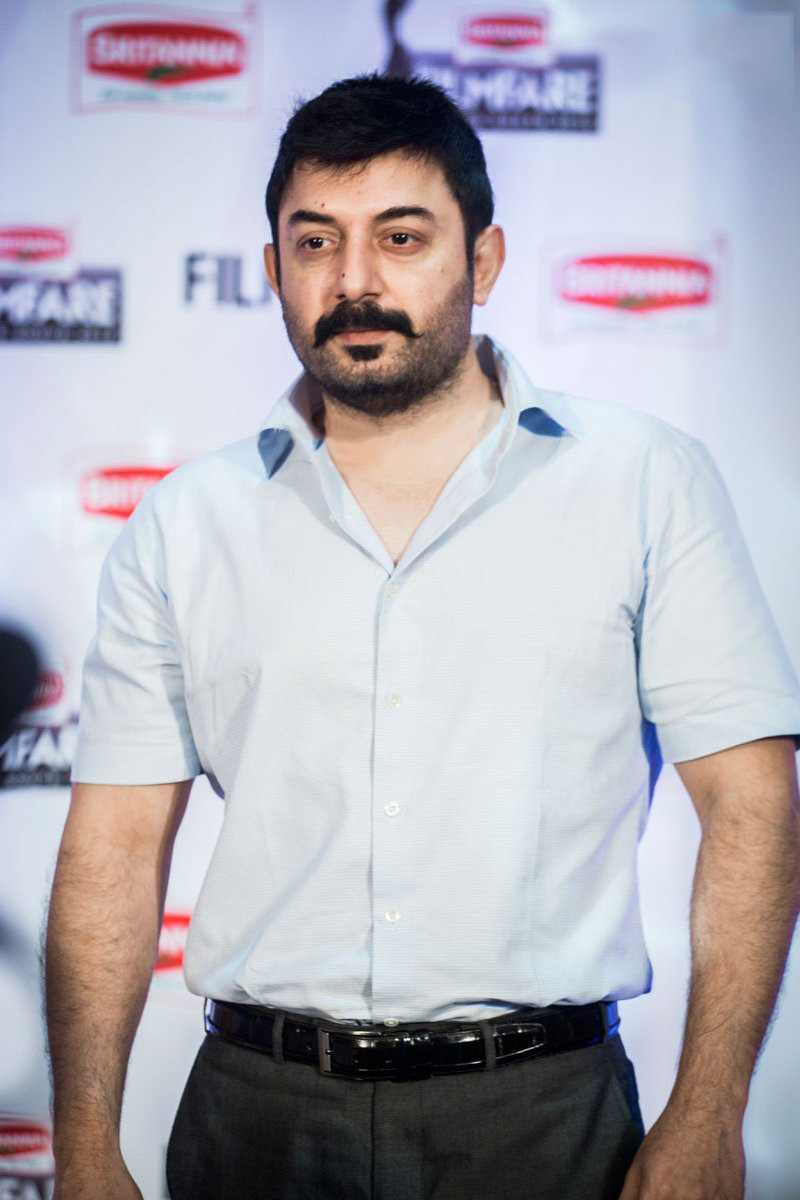
- Jayam Ravi and Arvind Swamy garnered several awards and nominations for their performances in Thani Oruvan
Accolades
Award	Won	Nominated
Ananda Vikatan Cinema Awards	1	1
Edison Awards	4	13
Filmfare Awards South	3	6
IIFA Utsavam	3	6
Mirchi Music Awards South	1	3
Norway Tamil Film Festival Awards	1	1
South Indian International Movie Awards	2	7
- Total number of awards and nominations (Note: Awards in certain categories do not have prior nominations and only winners are announced by the jury. For simplification and to avoid errors, each award in this list has been presumed to have had a prior nomination.)
Totals	21	37
- References

Thani Oruvan is a 2015 Indian Tamil-language action thriller film directed by Mohan Raja, who also co-wrote the screenplay and dialogues with the duo Subha. The film features Jayam Ravi, Arvind Swami and Nayanthara in the lead roles. Thambi Ramaiah, Ganesh Venkatraman, Mugdha Godse and Nassar play supporting roles. The film's story focuses on Mithran (Ravi), an IPS officer, who learns of the plans of scientist and businessman Siddharth Abhimanyu (Swami) to sabotage a deal to make generic medicines available at low cost for poor people. Siddharth succeeds in his plan and begins indulging in a game of cat and mouse with Mithran. The rest of the story revolves around how Mithran overcomes the obstacles set by Siddharth. Produced by Kalpathi S. Aghoram, Kalpathi S. Ganesh and Kalpathi S. Suresh under their company AGS Entertainment, the film's soundtrack and score were composed by Hiphop Tamizha. Ramji and Gopi Krishna handled the cinematography and editing respectively.

Made on a budget of ₹200 million, (Note: The average exchange rate in 2015 was 66.768 Indian rupees (₹) per 1 US dollar (US$).) Thani Oruvan was released on 28 August 2015 and received positive reviews. It was commercially successful, grossing ₹1.05 billion worldwide. The film won 21 awards from 37 nominations; its direction, story, screenplay, performances of the cast members and music have received the most attention from award groups.

At the 63rd Filmfare Awards South, Thani Oruvan was nominated in six categories, including Best Film (Aghoram, Ganesh and Suresh), Best Director (Raja) and Best Actor (Ravi); it won for Best Director, Best Supporting Actor (Swami) and Critics Award for Best Actor (Ravi). The film also received six nominations at the 1st IIFA Utsavam including Best Performance in a Lead Role (Female) (Nayanthara) and Best Performance in a Comic Role (Ramaiah). It won three, Best Direction, Best Performance in a Lead Role (Male), and Best Performance in a Negative Role for Raja, Ravi, and Swami respectively. The film received thirteen nominations at the 9th Edison Awards, and won for Best Director, Best Actor, Best Character Actor (Ramaiah) and Best Villain. It garnered seven nominations at the 4th South Indian International Movie Awards ceremony, winning two awards, including Best Film and Best Actor (Critics). At the Tamil Nadu State Film Awards, the film won awards in six categories. Among other wins, Thani Oruvan received one Ananda Vikatan Cinema Awards, Mirchi Music Awards South and Norway Tamil Film Festival Awards each.

== Awards and nominations ==
Award	Date of Ceremony (Note: Date is linked to the article about the awards held that year, wherever possible.)	Category	Recipient(s) and nominee(s)	Result	Ref.
Ananda Vikatan Cinema Awards	7 January 2016	Best Villain — Male	Arvind Swami	Won	
Edison Awards	14 February 2016	Best Director	Mohan Raja	Won	
Edison Awards	14 February 2016	Best Actor	Jayam Ravi	Won	
Edison Awards	14 February 2016	The Gorgeous Belle	Nayanthara	Nominated	
Edison Awards	14 February 2016	Best Character Actor	Thambi Ramaiah	Won	
Edison Awards	14 February 2016	Best Supporting Actor	Ganesh Venkatraman	Nominated	
Edison Awards	14 February 2016	Best Villain	Arvind Swami (Note: Shared with Arun Vijay for Yennai Arindhaal.)	Won	
Edison Awards	14 February 2016	Best Editor	Gopi Krishna	Nominated	
Edison Awards	14 February 2016	Best Female Playback Singer	Kharesma Ravichandran for "Kadhal Cricket"	Nominated	
Edison Awards	14 February 2016	Best Screenplay	Subha	Nominated	
Edison Awards	14 February 2016	Best Story	Mohan Raja	Nominated	
Edison Awards	14 February 2016	Best Background Score	Hiphop Tamizha	Nominated	
Edison Awards	14 February 2016	Best Lyricist	Aadhi for "Theemai Dhaan Vellum"	Nominated	
Edison Awards	14 February 2016	Best Producer	Kalpathi S. Aghoram, Kalpathi S. Ganesh, Kalpathi S. Suresh	Nominated	
Filmfare Awards South	18 June 2016	Best Film – Tamil	Kalpathi S. Aghoram, Kalpathi S. Ganesh, Kalpathi S. Suresh	Nominated	
Filmfare Awards South	18 June 2016	Best Director – Tamil	Mohan Raja	Won	
Filmfare Awards South	18 June 2016	Best Actor – Tamil	Jayam Ravi	Nominated	
Filmfare Awards South	18 June 2016	Best Supporting Actor – Tamil	Arvind Swami	Won	
Filmfare Awards South	18 June 2016	Best Female Playback Singer – Tamil	Kharesma Ravichandran for "Kadhal Cricket"	Nominated	
Filmfare Awards South	18 June 2016	Critics Best Actor – Tamil	Jayam Ravi	Won	
IIFA Utsavam	24–25 January 2016	Best Picture – Tamil	Kalpathi S. Aghoram, Kalpathi S. Ganesh, Kalpathi S. Suresh	Nominated	
IIFA Utsavam	24–25 January 2016	Best Direction – Tamil	Mohan Raja	Won	
IIFA Utsavam	24–25 January 2016	Best Performance in a Lead Role (Male) – Tamil	Jayam Ravi	Won	
IIFA Utsavam	24–25 January 2016	Best Performance in a Lead Role (Female) – Tamil	Nayanthara	Nominated	
IIFA Utsavam	24–25 January 2016	Best Performance in a Comic Role – Tamil	Thambi Ramaiah	Nominated	
IIFA Utsavam	24–25 January 2016	Best Performance in a Negative Role – Tamil	Arvind Swami	Won	
Mirchi Music Awards South	27 July 2016	Upcoming Female Vocalist of the year	Kharesma Ravichandran for "Kadhal Cricket"	Won	
Mirchi Music Awards South	27 July 2016	Upcoming Music Composer of the year	Hiphop Tamizha for "Kadhal Cricket"	Nominated	
Mirchi Music Awards South	27 July 2016	Upcoming Music Composer of the year	Hiphop Tamizha for "Kannala Kannala"	Nominated	
Norway Tamil Film Festival Awards	28 April–1 May 2016	Best Director	Mohan Raja	Won	
South Indian International Movie Awards	30 June–1 July 2016	Best Film – Tamil	Kalpathi S. Aghoram, Kalpathi S. Ganesh, Kalpathi S. Suresh	Won	
South Indian International Movie Awards	30 June–1 July 2016	Best Director – Tamil	Mohan Raja	Nominated	
South Indian International Movie Awards	30 June–1 July 2016	Best Actor – Tamil	Jayam Ravi	Nominated	
South Indian International Movie Awards	30 June–1 July 2016	Best Actor in a Negative Role – Tamil	Arvind Swami	Nominated	
South Indian International Movie Awards	30 June–1 July 2016	Best Music Director – Tamil	Hiphop Tamizha	Nominated	
South Indian International Movie Awards	30 June–1 July 2016	Best Female Playback Singer – Tamil	Kharesma Ravichandran for "Kadhal Cricket"	Nominated	
South Indian International Movie Awards	30 June–1 July 2016	Best Actor (Critics) – Tamil	Jayam Ravi	Won	
Tamil Nadu State Film Awards	6 March 2024	Best Film	Kalpathi S. Aghoram, Kalpathi S. Ganesh, Kalpathi S. Suresh	Won	
Tamil Nadu State Film Awards	6 March 2024	Best Story Writer	Mohan Raja	Won	
Tamil Nadu State Film Awards	6 March 2024	Best Villain	Arvind Swami	Won	
Tamil Nadu State Film Awards	6 March 2024	Best Cinematographer	Ramji	Won	
Tamil Nadu State Film Awards	6 March 2024	Best Editor	Gopi Krishna	Won	
Tamil Nadu State Film Awards	6 March 2024	Best Choreographer	Brinda	Won	

== See also ==
- List of Tamil films of 2015
