= Kshemamga Velli Labhamga Randi =

2000 Telugu comedy film

- Poster
- Directed by: Raja Vannem Reddy
- Written by: P. Rajendra Kumar (dialogues)
- Screenplay by: A. Mohan
- Story by: V. Sekhar
- Based on: Viralukketha Veekkam (1999)
- Produced by: M. V. Lakshmi; A. Mohan (presents)
- Starring: Srikanth; Rajendra Prasad; Brahmanandam; Ramya Krishna; Roja; Preethi; Kovai Sarala
- Cinematography: V. Jayaram
- Edited by: M. Babji; A. Mohan
- Music by: Vandemataram Srinivas
- Production company: M. L. Movie Aarts
- Release date: 4 February 2000
- Running time: 172 minutes
- Country: India
- Language: Telugu

Kshemamga Velli Labhamga Randi (transl. Go safe and come back prosperous) is a 2000 Telugu-language comedy film directed by Raja Vannem Reddy. The film features an ensemble cast of Srikanth, Rajendra Prasad, Brahmanandam, Ramya Krishna, Roja, Preethi and Kovai Sarala, with music composed by Vandemataram Srinivas. The film is produced by M. V. Lakshmi under the ML Art Movies banner and is presented by Editor Mohan. A remake of the Tamil film Viralukketha Veekkam (1999), it was released on 4 February 2000, and did well at the box office.

== Cast ==
- Srikanth as Ravi
- Rajendra Prasad as Rambabu
- Brahmanandam as Jembulingam
- Prakash Raj as Master
- Ramya Krishna as Baby / Bala Tripura Sundari (Voice dubbed by Roja Ramani)
- Roja as Geetha(Voice dubbed by Saritha)
- Preetha as Janaki (Voice dubbed by Shilpa)
- Kovai Sarala as Subbalakshmi
- Ravi Teja as Appala Raju
- M. S. Narayana as House Owner
- Giribabu as Garment Company Owner
- Chalapathi Rao as Motor Company Owner
- Jaya Prakash Reddy as Police Inspector
- Surya as Bezawada
- Raghava Lawrence as Special appearance
- Alphonsa as Ranganayaki

== Production ==
The film was launched at Vijaya Gardens, Chennai. The film marked the directorial debut of Raja Vannem Reddy.

== Soundtrack ==
Kshemamga Velli Labhamga Randi

Soundtrack album by Vandemataram Srinivas
- Released: 1999
- Recorded: 1999
- Genre: Feature film soundtrack
- Length: 26:13
- Language: Telugu
- Label: Supreme Music
- Producer: Vandemataram Srinivas

Vandemataram Srinivas chronology
'Jayam Manadera' (2000)	Kshemamga Velli Labhamga Randi (1999)	'Postman' (2000)

Music composed by Vandemataram Srinivas. Music released on Supreme Music Company.

No.	Title	Lyrics	Singer(s)	Length
1.	"Lovvuki Age"	Chandrabose	Udit Narayan, Anuradha Sriram	5:20
2.	"Joru Joruga"	Chandrabose	Sukhwinder Singh, Nithyasree Mahadevan	6:11
3.	"Adavallamandi Memu"	Chandrabose	Chitra, Mano	4:54
4.	"Appu Chesi Pappu Koodu"	Chandrabose	Udit Narayan	5:09
5.	"Okkari Kosam"	Sirivennela Sitarama Sastry	S. Janaki, Lalitha Sagari, Harini	4:39
Total length:				26:13

== Release and reception ==
Kshemamga Velli Labhamga Randi was released on 4 February 2000. Sify said the film "is far superior to the original". Jeevi of Idlebrain.com said, "In a way, this film is very good one if you prefer watching a pure comedy. But if you prefer a story oriented film, this film might fail deliver the goods! But for Brahmanandam and Kovai Sarala this film stands as another feather in their cap". Andhra Today wrote "In these days of inflation when dual incomes are required to meet the expenses of the family, the story is neither strong nor does it offer much novelty. The scenes peppered with good deal of humor sails very smoothly. The deft handling by the director is impressive." The success of the film prompted editor-producer Mohan to continue to invest in other film projects. With the financial gain from Kshemamga Velli Labhamga Randi, he launched a film with his son Mohan Raja as director.
