= Mazhai =

- Theatrical release poster
- Directed by: Rajkumar
- Screenplay by: Rajkumar
- Story by: Veeru Potla
- Based on: Varsham by Veeru Potla
- Produced by: SPB Charan
- Starring: Ravi Mohan; Shriya Saran
- Cinematography: Rajesh Yadav
- Edited by: Anthony
- Music by: Devi Sri Prasad
- Production company: Capital Cinemaa
- Distributed by: S. P. Balasubrahmanyam
- Release date: 30 September 2005
- Running time: 156 minutes
- Country: India
- Language: Tamil

Mazhai (transl. Rain) is a 2005 Indian Tamil-language romantic action film directed by Rajkumar in his debut. It is a remake of the 2004 Telugu film Varsham, and stars Ravi Mohan (credited as Jayam Ravi) and Shriya Saran. Vadivelu, Kalabhavan Mani and Rahul Dev play supporting roles. The film's music is composed by Devi Sri Prasad with cinematography by Rajesh Yadav and editing by Anthony. It was released on 30 September 2005.

== Plot ==
Arjun (Ravi Mohan), an unemployed youngster, and Deva (Rahul Dev), a powerful don, both fall in love with Sailaja (Shriya Saran), a middle-class beauty, at the same time on a rainy day at a railway station. Arjun keeps bumping into Sailaja coincidentally every time it rains. This makes them both feel that it is the rain that keeps bringing them together, and they start to fall in love. Deva takes the backdoor route to get Sailaja, with the help of her good-for-nothing father, Sundaramoorthy (Kalabhavan Mani). After learning of Arjun's and Sailaja's love, Deva and Sundaramoorthy work up devious plans to break them up. They soon succeed in creating a rift between the two lovers. Though Arjun realizes what is really happening, Sailaja falls prey to Deva and her father's foils. The young lovers part ways; Sailaja becomes a leading lady in the movies, and Arjun works with his uncle (Rajesh) in a quarry as a demolition expert. Deva is cheated out of some money by Sundaramoorthy, and he finds out where Sailaja lives and kidnaps her. Sundaramoorthy realizes that the only person who is daring enough and cares enough to get his daughter back is Arjun and goes to him with his pleas. It takes much convincing, but Arjun decides to rescue Sailaja but for reasons other than love. At this point, Sailaja begins to realize that her father lied to her and tries to get back with Arjun, but he refuses because she did not trust him. Sailaja convinces Arjun that it was not her fault, and they both start loving again. In the end, Arjun and Deva gets into a fight, where Arjun wins. Deva tries to kill Arjun, but a burning statue of Ravanan falls on Deva, which kills him. In the end, Arjun unites with Shailaja.

== Cast ==
- Ravi Mohan as Arjun
- Shriya Saran as Shailaja
- Vadivelu as Aarumugam
- Kalabhavan Mani as Sundaramoorthy, Shailaja's father
- Rahul Dev as Deva
- Ambika as Sneha Varadharajan, Shailaja's mother
- K. S. L. Swamy as Deva's uncle
- Venkat Prabhu as Kasi
- Charle as Director
- Pyramid Natarajan as Producer
- Rajesh as Sundaram, Arjun's uncle
- Devadarshini as Kousalya Gowtham, Arjun's sister
- Sudha as Alamelu, Deva's mother
- Tanikella Bharani as Rajapandi, Deva's father
- Vatsala Rajagopal as Julie Ganapathi, Shailaja's grandmother
- Vennira Aadai Moorthy as Rangarajan Iyengar, Shailaja's grandfather
- Madhan Bob as Idi Ameen, weather reporter
- Pandu as Priest
- Mahanadi Shankar as Deva's henchman
- Bonda Mani as Petrol Bunk Employee
- Sethu Vinayagam as Home Minister
- Singamuthu as Aarumugam's customer
- Halwa Vasu as Aarumugam's customer

== Production ==
The film was initially to be produced by Ravi Mohan's father Editor Mohan. Ra The film marked the directorial debut of Rajkumar who earlier assisted Charan and Vasanth. Rajesh Yadav who handled the film's cinematography revealed that for the song "Nee Varumbodhu" in order to achieve rain effect, the railway station was made wet, rain machines were fixed in seven places and for this pipes were bought from abroad. The film was shot at locations including Kuttralam, Tenkasi, Nagercoil, Hyderabad and Chennai.

== Soundtrack ==
The soundtrack features six songs composed by Devi Sri Prasad, retaining five of the tunes from the original except for "Kuchi Karuvadu", which was based on "Kandhi Chenu Kada" from Naa Alludu (2005).

Song title	Singers	Lyrics	Time
"Nee Varumbodhu"	K. S. Chithra, Kalpana, Raqueeb Alam	Vairamuthu	5:36
"Mannile (I Love You Shailaja)"	SPB Charan, Sumangali	Vairamuthu	5:25
"Isthanbul"	Jassie Gift, Kalpana	Vairamuthu	4:15
"Thappe Ille"	S. P. Balasubrahmanyam, Harini	Vairamuthu	3:57
"Muthu Mazhaiye"	Sagar, Sumangali	Vairamuthu	1:24
"Kuchikaruvadu"	Tippu, Srilekha Parthasarathy	Vairamuthu	5:30

== Critical reception ==
Sify wrote "At best, Mazhai is a passable time pass fare if you don't care for logic and reason". Lajjavathi of Kalki praised Shriya, cinematography, sets and song picturizations but felt the screenplay had lot of loopholes. Cinesouth wrote, "Debut making director Rajkumar has not made any great changes from the original version. He could have shown some intelligent ploy used by Ravi to rescue Shreya from Rahul Dev's clutches. It is ridiculous to see Ravi bashing up hundreds of hoodlums". G. Ulaganathan of Deccan Herald wrote "It is a miracle how the film became a hit in Telugu. Hundreds of such films have hit the Telugu screen before, so also Tamil. It is equally baffling what prompted the playback singer S P Balasubramaniam to remake it in Tamil. It has a stale story, steriotyped performances, a hero whose only asset is his physique and who is yet to pick up the rudiments of acting skills and a poor screenplay. The only plus point is the heroine, Shreya, who looks pretty, acts well and manages to avoid looking vulgar even when drenched in the rain".
