= Raavi =

Raavi (Telugu: రావి) is a Telugu surname. It is distinct from "Ravi" (రవి), which means "Sun" in Telugu. "Raavi" refers to the peepal tree, a sacred and culturally significant tree in Indian traditions. People of this last name belong to Vyshya caste. Majority of people with this last name live in the Bhattiprolu/Repalle/Tenali regions of Guntur district, Nellore in Andhra Pradesh India. In the past most of these people were farmers.

== Notable people ==
- Raavi Kondala Rao (1932–2020), Telugu film personality
- Raavi Narayana Reddy (1908–1991), Telangana freedom fighter

== See also ==
- Ravi (name)
