= M. Kumaran Son of Mahalakshmi =

2004 film by M. Raja

- Theatrical release poster
- Directed by: M. Raja
- Written by: Prasanna Kumar (dialogues)
- Screenplay by: M. Raja
- Story by: Puri Jagannadh
- Produced by: M. Raja
- Starring: Ravi Mohan; Asin; Nadhiya; Prakash Raj
- Cinematography: Balasubramaniem
- Edited by: S. Surajkavee
- Music by: Srikanth Deva
- Production company: Jayam Productions
- Release date: 1 October 2004
- Running time: 168 minutes
- Country: India
- Language: Tamil

M. Kumaran Son of Mahalakshmi is a 2004 Indian Tamil-language sports drama film co-written and directed by M. Raja, starring Ravi Mohan (credited as Jayam Ravi), Asin, Nadhiya, and Prakash Raj, while Vivek and Subbaraju play supporting roles. This marks the Tamil debut of Asin and the return of Nadhiya after a hiatus. The film's score and soundtrack are composed by Srikanth Deva. It is a remake of the Telugu film Amma Nanna O Tamila Ammayi, also starring Asin in her reprised role from the original version. The film became one of the most profitable Tamil films of 2004.

== Plot ==
For Kumaran, life revolves around his mother, Mahalakshmi, who is separated from his father, Easwar. Easwar pursued his passion for kickboxing, becoming a world-renowned trainer based in Malaysia. Meanwhile, Mahalakshmi has remained in Chennai, devoting her life to raising Kumaran. Kumaran is also passionate about kickboxing and shares a special relationship with his mother. However, her death shatters his world. On her deathbed, she asks him to meet his father, so he travels to Malaysia to do so. He finds work at his father's kickboxing academy, but he also discovers that his father has remarried and had a daughter named Swapna with his new wife, Shalini. Kumaran feels betrayed and angry, which causes plenty of friction between them. Meanwhile, Easwar is training a boxer named Anand, whom he believes will win the championship. He considers Anand his protégé and often shows favouritism towards him over Kumaran. However, Anand soon gets Swapna pregnant and leaves her. Kumaran finds out when he follows Swapna and Shalini to a pet shop, where they are buying insect repellent to kill themselves with. They attempt suicide, but Kumaran saves them. He then betrays Easwar by joining another team when they offer him a better contract. The rest of the story follows Easwar training Kumaran to compete against Anand in a kickboxing competition, while Kumaran helps his half-sister with matters of the heart. Kumaran wins the kickboxing championship. The film ends with Kumaran seeing a final apparition of his mother looking at him proudly and waving goodbye.

== Cast ==
- Ravi Mohan as M. Kumaran
- Asin as Mythili alias Malabar
- Nadhiya as Mahalakshmi, Kumaran's mother
- Prakash Raj as Easwar, Kumaran's father
- Vivek as Ganesh, Kumaran's friend
- Aishwarya as Shalini, Easwar’s second wife
- Deepu as Swapna, Easwar and Shalini’s daughter
- Subburaj as Anand
- Livingston as Sheikh Fakhrudeen
- Manobala as Ganesh's father
- Vennira Aadai Moorthy as Namboothri
- Vaiyapuri as Velu
- Janagaraj as the inspector
- R. S. Shivaji as Constable Sambandham
- Jyothi Lakshmi as Malabar's aunt
- O. A. K. Sundar as Kumaran's coach
- Bonda Mani as assistant priest
- Muthukaalai as a man at the mall
- Cool Suresh as a rowdy
- Nandha Saravanan as a rowdy
- Shanthi Anandraj as Mahalakshmi's colleague
- Vijay Ganesh as a devotee
- Master Chandrahasan as young Kumaran
- Geetha Lakshmi as Malayali
- Freddy Odiyo as an emcee
- Osthe J. Ram as henchman
- Kalyan (in the song "Tamizh Nattu Manava")
- Ragasya (in the song "Yaaru Yaaru Ivano")
- Vijay Sethupathi as a boxing student (uncredited)

== Production ==
After the success of Jayam (2003), Raja decided to remake the successful Telugu film Amma Nanna O Tamila Ammayi (2003). The film was originally titled M. Kumaran S/O Bhagyalakshmi. Raja made a few modifications to the film including adding a child episode to the film's introduction after his father Editor Mohan suggested it. Unlike Amma Nanna O Tamila Ammayi which featured both the mother and father characters living in India, M. Kumaran Son of Mahalakshmi featured the father's character living in Malaysia.

Nadhiya made her acting comeback with this film portraying Ravi's mother as Raja felt that he wanted to portray her as a modern mother as opposed to the usual portrayal of mothers, and she was the right choice for the role. According to Urvashi, she was the original choice for Nadhiya's role and Vijay was attached as lead actor. Some of the comedy scenes were copied from the 1997 Hindi film Ishq. This film marked Vijay Sethupathi's first noticeable role and he was seen during Ravi's introduction sequence. He was paid ₹79 rupees for his role. Asin and Prakash Raj reprised their roles from original Telugu version.

== Soundtrack ==
The songs and background score was done by Srikanth Deva. The song "Ayyo Ayyo" interpolated the Malaysian song "Hati Kama", composed by Pak Ngah. The song "Chennai Senthamizh" is based on "Chennai Chandrama" from the original, which in turn is based on "Mahaganapathim" by Muthuswami Dikshitar, and is set in the Carnatic raga Nattai. The original composers of both of these songs were not given credit.

Track listing
No.	Title	Lyrics	Singer(s)	Length
1.	"Chennai Senthamizh"	Na. Muthukumar	Harish Raghavendra	4:17
2.	"Neeye Neeye"	Vaali	KK	6:19
3.	"Ayyo Ayyo"	Yugabharathi	Udit Narayan, Shalini Singh	5:47
4.	"Vacchuka Vacchukava"	Srikanth Deva	KK, Srilekha Parthasarathy	5:25
5.	"Yaaru Yaaru Ivano"	Kabilan	Devan, Febi Mani	5:13
6.	"Tamizh Nattu Maanava"	Pa. Vijay	Shankar Mahadevan, Premgi Amaren	5:22
7.	"Neeye Neeye" (II)	Vaali	Srikanth Deva	6:22
Total length:				38:45

== Reception ==
=== Critical reception ===
Malathi Rangajan of The Hindu wrote, "casting is a main draw", praising the inclusion of Nadhiya. A critic from Sify wrote "MKSM begins on a fresh note but peters off in the latter half into a mushy sentimental drama that is so predictable with no reason or logic". G. Ulaganathan of Deccan Herald felt Ravi looked "quite uncomfortable in the presence of actors like Prakash Raj" and that Vivek "tends to do an action replay of some of his earlier films" and Malaysia "could have been better used" but appreciated Nadhiya's acting. Rediff.com listed the film amongst the "best Tamil films of 2004", stating that the film was "a big success".

The film went on to become a commercial success and a major leap in Jayam Ravi's career.

=== Box-office ===
The film collected share of ₹54 lakh in 40 days in Chennai.
