= Thillalangadi =

2010 film by Mohan Raja

- Theatrical release poster
- Directed by: M. Raja
- Screenplay by: M. Raja
- Based on: Kick by Vakkantham Vamsi
- Produced by: Editor Mohan; M. Raja
- Starring: Ravi Mohan; Tamannaah; Shaam
- Cinematography: B. Rajasekar
- Edited by: Ram Sudharsan
- Music by: Songs: Yuvan Shankar Raja; Thaman S; Score: Thaman S
- Production company: Jayam Company
- Distributed by: Sun Pictures
- Release date: 23 July 2010
- Running time: 180 minutes
- Country: India
- Language: Tamil

Thillalangadi (transl. Defiler) is a 2010 Indian Tamil-language action comedy film directed by M. Raja. A remake of the 2009 Telugu film Kick, it stars Raja's brother Ravi Mohan (credited as Jayam Ravi) along with Tamannaah Bhatia and Shaam, who reprises his role from Kick, and a supporting cast including Prabhu, Suhasini Maniratnam, Vadivelu, Santhanam, and Sanchita Shetty. It depicts the story of a brilliant student who has excelled in all aspects of life but loves to have an adventure in his life and would do anything just to experience this kick (addiction). The film, produced by Raja's father Editor Mohan and distributed by Sun Pictures, was released on 23 July 2010.

== Plot ==
Krishna is a happy-go-lucky youth who excels in every field but always does strange and dangerous things to obtain a certain "kick" – a thrill or excitement that he craves. One such activity is secretly double-crossing his childhood friend Das while helping him elope. At this point, he meets Nisha, who is shocked at his recklessness and writes him off as crazy. Krishna sets his sights on Nisha and woos her in a very unorthodox way; he begs her not to fall in love with him. After a host of comical situations involving Krishna's caring but easygoing parents, local thugs, and an ever-present comic relief Jackson, Nisha accepts Krishna's love. However, she sets a condition: Krishna must stay in a well-paying job (he had resigned from other jobs due to lack of "kick"), and only then will she agree to marry him. Krishna accepts but soon resigns again for the same reason and tries to hide it from Nisha. When Nisha finds out, she breaks up with him and leaves him for good.

Some months later, Nisha's parents arrange for her to meet a prospective suitor in Malaysia. Though reluctant, she meets the suitor Krishna Kumar, a tough but honest policeman. She narrates the story of her affair with Krishna, and Krishna Kumar reveals that he is tracking a dangerous thief who has stolen large amounts of money from wealthy (mostly corrupt) politicians. At Malaysia, Nisha, her sister, and Jackson run into Krishna again but learn that he has lost his memory and cannot remember his past life. Nisha sees this as an opportunity to start their relationship again from scratch. However, it is revealed that Krishna is not really suffering from amnesia; he has faked his condition by convincing an amnesiac that he is a doctor, and tricked him into diagnosing his condition falsely. Nisha is upset but realises that it was done due to his love for her, and she has hidden her own feelings from him. They reconcile.

Meanwhile, it is revealed that the thief whom Krishna Kumar has been tracking is Krishna. His motives are simple; he steals ill-gotten money from politicians to pay for operations of children suffering from cancer. After manipulating various people, such as an MLA, and stealing from them, he is finally caught in the act by Krishna Kumar. Krishna is still unfazed, celebrating his failure at a street party. He dares Krishna Kumar to catch him in his final crime: stealing money from the minister. After many harrowing stunts, Krishna pulls it off successfully. Krishna Kumar is demoted from his job for his failure and is shocked to learn that his replacement is Krishna, who promises to "guard" the minister's remaining money. Knowing what is in store for the politicians, Krishna Kumar leaves with a new respect for his foe.

== Cast ==
- Ravi Mohan as Krishna (Thillalangadi)
- Shaam as ACP Krishna Kumar
- Tamannaah as Nisha
- Prabhu as Vatti, Krishna's father
- Vadivelu as Jackson "Jacky" / John
- Santhanam as Dr. Butty Paul
- Ganja Karuppu as Karuppu
- Sathyan as Das
- Thyagu as Minister
- Manivannan as an ashram staff member
- Mansoor Ali Khan as the police inspector
- Manobala as a priest
- Livingston as Ganesan, Nisha's uncle
- V. Jayaprakash as Ramaswamy, Nisha's father
- Mayilsamy as Maasi's sidekick
- Five Star Krishna as Venkat
- Geetha as Janaki, Krishna Kumar's mother
- Sankar Guru Raja as Natraj Veerabhadran, Krishna Kumar's father
- Kadhal Dhandapani as Minister Chandra Lakshman
- John Vijay as 'Manda Odu' Maasi
- Crane Manohar as a drunkard
- Suhasini as Valli, Krishna's mother
- Sanchita Shetty as Ammu
- Nalini as an MLA Vannai Vasanthi, Nisha's mother
- Chandra Lakshman as Shreya Das
- Vijayalakshmi as Swapna
- Latha Rao as Usha
- Vichu as Rajaraam's PA
- Shankar Sundaram as a doctor
- L. R. Eswari as herself
- Lakshmi Vasudevan as Dhanalakshmi, Nisha's aunt

Uncredited

- Radha Ravi as Minister Rajaraam
- Yogi Babu as Maasi's sidekick
- Osthe J. Ram as Maasi's sidekick

== Production ==
After the success of the Telugu film Kick in early May 2009, Editor Mohan purchased the remake rights for the Tamil version later the same month. While Mohan himself would produce the film, his elder son Raja was made the director, and younger son Ravi would play the lead role. Shaam, who played a vital role in the Telugu version, took up the same the role in Tamil. The remake, titled Thillalangadi, was formally launched on 19 August 2009 at AVM Studios. The first shot, featuring Ravi and the lead actress Tamannaah Bhatia, was directed by S. Shankar, with actor Vijay giving the inaugural clap shot. Bhatia opted not to emulate Ileana D'Cruz, who played the same role in Kick, but play the role in her own style. The first shot of cast member Sanchita Shetty was taken at VGP Golden Beach Resort.

The film was predominantly shot at Malaysia. A car chase sequence there was filmed with three cameras simultaneously. Scenes were also shot at the Petronas Towers and the Singapore-Malaysian railway line. On 1 October, the 2009 Sumatra earthquakes affected Kuala Lumpur, where the team of Thillalangadi were filming but they survived it. In early 2010, a song sequence ("Solpechu Ketkadha Sundari"), widely publicised as the "360 degree song" was shot. It was filmed using a Nero motion control camera that revolves on a 360-degree angle set, which was handled by an Australian specialist and would later look like a single shot. This song, choreographed by Shobi, featuring 15 Ravis and 5 Bhatias, was completed in around 45 hours, on which alone nearly ₹75 lakh (equivalent to ₹1.7 crore or US$170,000 in 2023) was reportedly spent. Another song, involving numerous Russian background dancers and around 150,000 lights, reportedly cost ₹50 lakh (equivalent to ₹1.1 crore or US$120,000 in 2023) and was completed in 5 days.

== Music ==
Thillalangadi

Soundtrack album by Yuvan Shankar Raja
- Released: 2 July 2010
- Recorded: 2009–10
- Genre: Feature film soundtrack
- Length: 34:59
- Label: Sony Music India
- Producer: Yuvan Shankar Raja

Yuvan Shankar Raja chronology
Kaadhal Solla Vandhen (2010)	Thillalangadi (2010)	Naan Mahaan Alla (2010)

The Thillalangadi soundtrack is composed by Yuvan Shankar Raja. The soundtrack album features 7 songs, of which two ("Pootta Paathadhum" and "Idhayam Karaikirathe") were reused from the original version, composed by Thaman S. Silambarasan was chosen to sing a song at Ravi's request. The audio was released on 2 July 2010 and premiered on Sun Music the same evening.

Track listing
No.	Title	Lyrics	Music	Singer(s)	Length
1.	"Ding Ding"	Viveka	Yuvan Shankar Raja	Vijay Prakash, Naveen	5:14
2.	"Sol Pechu"	Na. Muthukumar	Yuvan Shankar Raja	K. S. Chithra, Shreya Ghoshal, Yuvan Shankar Raja	4:56
3.	"Pootta Paathadhum"	Viveka	Thaman S	Suchitra	3:39
4.	"Memory Loss"	Viveka	Yuvan Shankar Raja	Kailash Kher, Ranjith	4:28
5.	"Pattu Pattu"	Na. Muthukumar	Yuvan Shankar Raja	Silambarasan, Manasi Scott	4:57
6.	"Idhayam Karaikirathe"	Viveka	S. Thaman	Srivardhini	2:35
7.	"Thothu Ponen"	Viveka	Yuvan Shankar Raja	Shankar Mahadevan	3:24
Total length:					34:59

== Release ==
=== Theatrical ===
Thillalangadi had a solo release on 23 July 2010. It was distributed by Sun Pictures. Post release, the film's promos shown on various television channels angered Congress workers who alleged the film was insulting Sonia Gandhi, then the chairperson of the United Progressive Alliance, and launched large-scale rally protests.

=== Home media ===
The film had its television premiere on 21 December 2014 via Sun TV.

== Reception ==
A reviewer from Sify rated the film as "average" film and added that it is "boring". Pavithra Srinivasan from Rediff.com cited the film as a "ridiculous pot-boiler" and criticised Ravi's lacking punch and wafer-thin story line, giving the film a mere 1.5 out of 5. A critic from The Times of India also criticised the film saying that it "lacks that light touch needed to carry off the candyfloss content" as well as Jayam Ravi's performance describing his character as "a ham of what is simply a ridiculously featherweight character". A critic from Chennai Online said "the film somehow manages to entertain with comedy elements". Malathi Rangarajan of The Hindu wrote, "what do you say about a film that tries hard to be funny and serious at once, a hero who projects himself as an aimless wanderer and is also a Robin Hood at the same time, a heroine who comes up with the same kind of expressions in scene after scene and a comedian who tickles in fits and starts? Quagmire of confusion!".
