= Alphonsa (actress) =

Indian film actress

- Born: Chennai, India
- Other name: Alfonsa
- Occupation: Actress
- Years active: 1990–2013

Alphonsa is an Indian actress known for her works in South Indian films, predominantly in item numbers, supporting and cameo roles.

== Career ==
Alphonsa played a supporting role in K. S. Ravikumar's Panchathanthiram (2002), appearing alongside Kamal Haasan in a few scenes like, before appearing in Kadhal Sadugudu (2003), opposite Vikram, where her work was described as "lewd".

== Personal life ==
Alphonsa was born in Tamil Nadu. Her younger brother is choreographer Robert, who has also worked in films as an actor. Alphonsa married Nazeer, her co-star in Parvu Mazhai, in 2001, against the wishes of her family.

Alphonsa had lived with an upcoming actor, Vinod, in a live-in relationship for two years, before he committed suicide in 2012. Alphonsa also then attempted suicide in March 2012 by consuming excessive sleeping pills, but was saved. Reports initially emerged casting suspicion over the actress's involvement in Vinod's death. She later insisted that such allegations were baseless. She stated that Vinod had played the lead in a movie called Kavasam, alongside Murali, which was put on hold because of financial problems, and that the failure to make it as an actor in films despite half a decade of hard work had him feeling depressed enough to commit suicide.

== Filmography ==
Year	Film	Role	Language	Notes
1995	Pai Brothers	Mohini	Malayalam	
1995	Baashha		Tamil	Special appearance ("Ra..Ra..Ramaiya")
1995	Nadodi Mannan	Dilruba	Tamil	
1996	Maanbumigu Maanavan		Tamil	Special appearance
1997	Dongata		Telugu	Special appearance
1997	Pudhayal		Tamil	Special appearance
1997	Ratchagan		Tamil	Special appearance
1997	Zindabad		Kannada	Special appearance
1997	Evandi Pelli Chesukondi		Telugu	Special appearance
1997	Thoka Leni Pitta		Telugu	
1997	Preminchukundam Raa		Telugu	Special appearance
1997	Subhakankshalu		Telugu	Special appearance
1997	Loha		Hindi	Special appearance
1997	W/o V. Vara Prasad		Telugu	Special appearance
1997	Periya Manushan		Tamil	Special appearance
1998	Thulli Thirintha Kaalam		Tamil	Special appearance
1998	Valamapirinju		Malayalam	Special appearance
1998	Rathna		Tamil	Special appearance
1998	Life Lo Wife		Telugu	Special appearance
1998	Sollamale		Tamil	Special appearance
1998	Nilaave Vaa		Tamil	Special appearance
1998	Thayin Manikodi		Tamil	Special appearance
1998	Suprabhatam	Chilakamma	Telugu	
1998	Navvulata	Ramulamma	Telugu	
1998	Unnudan		Tamil	Special appearance
1998	Cheran Chozhan Pandian		Tamil	Special appearance
1999	Suriya Paarvai	Sheela	Tamil	Special appearance
1999	Malabar Police	Sona	Tamil	Special appearance
1999	Rajasthan		Telugu	Special appearance
1999	Suyamvaram		Tamil	Special appearance
1999	Kaama		Tamil	Special appearance
1999	Sivan		Tamil	Special appearance
1999	Underworld		Kannada	Special appearance
1999	Thirupathi Ezhumalai Venkatesa	Gajala	Tamil	
1999	Azhagarsamy		Tamil	Special appearance
1999	Kummi Paattu		Tamil	Special appearance
1999	Red Indians		Malayalam	Special appearance
2000	Narasimham		Malayalam	Special appearance
2000	The Warrant		Malayalam	Special appearance
2000	Kouravudu		Telugu	Special appearance
2000	Sardukupodaam Randi		Telugu	Special appearance
2000	Ennamma Kannu		Tamil	Special appearance
2000	Kshemamga Velli Labhamga Randi	Ranganayaki	Telugu	Special appearance
2000	Manasichanu		Telugu	Special appearance
2000	Maa Pelliki Randi		Telugu	Special appearance
2000	Independence Day		Tamil/Kannada	Special appearance
2000	Kannaal Pesavaa		Tamil	Special appearance
2000	February 14 Necklace Road	Asha	Telugu	
2001	Vaanchinathan		Tamil	Special appearance
2001	Paarvai Ondre Pothume		Tamil	Special appearance ("Nee Paarthuttu Ponaalum")
2001	Badri		Tamil	Special appearance ("Salaam Maharasa")
2001	Dhill		Tamil	Special appearance ("Machan Meesai")
2001	Adhipathi		Telugu	Special appearance
2001	Kalisi Naduddam		Telugu	Special appearance
2001	Murari		Telugu	Special appearance
2001	Raa		Telugu	Special appearance
2002	Iravu Padagan		Tamil	Special appearance
2002	Panchathantiram	Smuggling boss' mistress	Tamil	
2002	Shree		Tamil	Special appearance ("Madura Jilla")
2002	Kadhal Azhivathillai		Tamil	Special appearance ("Pilaiyar Suzhi")
2003	Kadhal Sadugudu	Carolina	Tamil	Special appearance ("Carolinaa")
2003	Sena		Tamil	Special appearance
2003	Yes Madam		Tamil	Special appearance
2003	The Fire		Malayalam	Special appearance
2003	Amma Nanna O Tamila Ammayi		Telugu	Special appearance
2005	Mahanandi		Telugu	Special appearance
2010	Dasanna		Telugu	Special appearance
2012	Madirasi		Malayalam	
2013	Police Maman		Malayalam	Special appearance
