= Ravikant =

Ravikant and Ravikanth are given names of Indian origin. People with those names include:

- Ravikant Nagaich (1931–1991), Indian film personality
- Ravikanth (actor) (born 1962), Indian actor
- Ravikanth Perepu (active from 2013), Indian film screenwriter and director
- Ravikant Shukla (born 1987), Indian cricketer
- Ravikant Singh (born 1994), Indian former cricketer

== See also ==
- Naval Ravikant, Indian American entrepreneur
- Ravi Kant (disambiguation)
