= Hitler (1997 film) =

1997 Telugu film by Muthyala Subbaiah

- Theatrical release poster
- Directed by: Muthyala Subbaiah
- Screenplay by: Muthyala Subbaiah; L. B. Sriram (dialogues)
- Story by: Siddique
- Based on: Hitler (1996)
- Produced by: M. V. Lakshmi; Editor Mohan
- Starring: Chiranjeevi; Rambha; Rajendra Prasad
- Cinematography: K. Dattu
- Edited by: Aakula Bhaskar Rao; Editor Mohan (Supervision)
- Music by: Koti
- Production company: M. L. Movie Arts
- Release date: 4 January 1997
- Running time: 153 minutes
- Country: India
- Language: Telugu

Hitler is a 1997 Indian Telugu-language action comedy film directed by Muthyala Subbaiah, starring Chiranjeevi, Rambha, and Rajendra Prasad with music composed by Koti. A remake of the 1996 Malayalam film of the same name, it follows the story of an overprotective brother safeguarding his five sisters from external threats.

Prior to signing the film, Chiranjeevi took a year-long hiatus after two consecutive flops, seeking distinctive and meaningful roles. Hitler provided such an opportunity, and its release on 4 January 1997 marked a successful comeback for him at the box office.

== Plot ==
The film follows Madhava Rao, also known as Madhava, a hot-tempered man who lives in a town with his five sisters—Sarada, Annapurna (Ammu), Lakshmi, Gayatri, and Saraswati. Madhava is highly protective of his sisters and fiercely punishes anyone who mistreats them, earning him the nickname "Hitler" from the local youth. His maternal uncle Aadi Seshu's children, Balachandra (Balu) and Bujji, are close to the family, and marriages between Balu and Ammu, and Madhava and Bujji, are set to take place once Sarada is married.

During the search for Sarada's match, a series of misunderstandings occur when Balu, hiding from Madhava, is discovered at the house. Madhava, misunderstanding the situation, becomes enraged and cancels all marital arrangements with Balu and Bujji. Aadi Seshu's derogatory comments about the sisters escalate the conflict, leading to the severing of family ties. Despite the setback, Balu vows to marry Ammu and reconcile with Madhava.

Meanwhile, Madhava's strained relationship with his father, whom he blames for his mother's death due to a remarriage orchestrated by Aadi Seshu, deepens. Aadi Seshu, fearing retribution from Madhava and his father, aligns with the Rudraraju brothers, long-time enemies of Madhava. The brothers plot to ruin Sarada's life by having her molested by her professor, Mohana Rao. When Sarada insists on marrying the professor to preserve her dignity, Madhava reluctantly agrees, unaware of the full truth. Distraught over the situation, Ammu leaves home and marries Balu, further alienating Madhava.

Aadi Seshu continues to obstruct Balu and Ammu's efforts to return to the family, forcing them to move next door to Madhava. Meanwhile, Madhava’s father, now aware of the full extent of Aadi Seshu’s treachery, attempts to reconcile Bujji and Madhava, but his efforts fail comically. The Rudraraju brothers then attempt to marry Bujji to their youngest brother, Chinna, but she escapes by pretending to be pregnant.

The Rudraraju brothers escalate their attacks by falsely accusing Madhava’s other sisters of prostitution. Madhava's father intervenes to protect them, but in the process, he is framed. This leads to a confrontation between Madhava, Aadi Seshu, and Balu. The Rudraraju brothers take advantage of the situation by killing Madhava’s father, who reconciles with his son before dying. To prevent Madhava from becoming a murderer, his father withholds the identity of the killers.

Madhava’s half-sisters, now aware of the truth, seek reconciliation, but Madhava pushes them away, leaving them to stay with Ammu. A cold war ensues between Madhava and Balu, with Balu eventually stepping in to reunite the sisters with their brother. Meanwhile, the Rudraraju brothers, disguised as Madhava, attempt to kill Balu, but Madhava rushes to the hospital and is devastated by the rejection from his family.

Madhava eventually uncovers the truth about the Rudraraju brothers' involvement and confronts them. During the battle, Aadi Seshu, gravely injured, confesses Madhava’s innocence to the family. Madhava defeats the Rudraraju brothers but chooses to distance himself from his family, feeling burdened by his responsibilities. In the end, just as Madhava is about to leave, he witnesses a man teasing his sisters, prompting him to return and protect them. The film concludes with the message that Madhava, despite his tough exterior, never abandons his family.

== Cast ==
- Chiranjeevi as Madhav Rao / Hitler
- Rajendra Prasad as Balu / Balachandra
- Rambha as Bujji
- Dasari Narayana Rao as Madhava's father
- Rami Reddy as Rudraraju
- Prakash Raj as Chinna
- Ponnambalam as Rudraraju's brother
- Brahmanandam as Appala Konda
- Babu Mohan as Jabar
- Sudhakar as Kantha Rao
- Ali in a Cameo appearance
- Kitty as Aadiseshu
- Achyuth as Collector
- Ananth as Kantha Rao's gang
- Tirupathi Prakash as Kantha Rao's gang
- Uttej as Kantha Rao's gang
- Narayana Rao as Prof. Mohana Rao
- Kallu Chidambaram as Barber
- Rudra (Ashwini) as Sarada, first Sister
- Mohini as Ammu / Annapurna, Second Sister
- Padmasri as Lakshmi, third Sister
- Gayatri as Gayatri, fourth Sister
- Meena Kumari as Saraswati, fifth sister
- Subha as Aadiseshu's wife
- Kalpana Rai as Gangamma
- Y. Vijaya as Dance Teacher
- Master Baladitya as Young Madhav Rao
- Baby Shrestha

== Production ==
Editor Mohan who brought the remake rights of the Malayalam film Hitler (1996) sought to remake the film in Telugu with Mohan Babu as the lead. He approached director E. V. V. Satyanarayana to helm the remake but Satyanarayana politely rejected the offer as he was already teaming up with Mohan Babu for Adirindi Alludu (1996) and Veedevadandi Babu (1997). Subsequently, Chiranjeevi expressed interest in the project after being impressed with the script, agreeing to star in the film.

Following the success of Pavitra Bandham (1996), Muthyala Subbaiah was approached by Mohan to direct the Telugu version of Hitler. Mohan, familiar with Subbaiah’s skill in crafting emotional narratives, believed he was the right choice for the project. Subbaiah, a longtime admirer of Chiranjeevi, suggested the actor for the lead role after watching the original. However, Mohan revealed that Chiranjeevi had already approved the project and endorsed Subbaiah as the director due to his expertise in handling sentiment-driven stories.

At the time, Chiranjeevi had been on a year-long hiatus, rejecting scripts that didn't interest him. He wanted unique roles with strong stories, which Hitler offered. When he agreed to join the project, it became a hot topic in the industry. Fans congratulated Subbaiah but also sent warning letters, stressing that the film had to succeed. Despite the expectations, Subbaiah remained confident in the story's potential. He made several adjustments to the screenplay to better resonate with Telugu audiences, focusing on emotional depth and local sensibilities.

Dasari Narayana Rao was cast as Chiranjeevi's father, lending a unique gravitas to the role. The film balanced intense emotional moments with humour, supported by performances from Rajendra Prasad, Sudhakar, Brahmanandam, and Kalpana Rai. The film featured two pathos songs, "O Kaalamaa" and "Kanneellake Kanneellocche", which received widespread appreciation from audiences. Subbaiah personally oversaw the choreography of these songs to maintain the emotional impact.

== Soundtrack ==
Hitler

Film score by Koti
- Released: 1997
- Genre: Soundtrack
- Length: 30:34
- Label: Lahari Music
- Producer: Koti

Koti chronology
| Muddula Mogudu (1997) | Hitler (1997) | Subhakankshalu (1997) |

Music was composed by Koti and was released by Lahari Music Company. The song "Nadaka Kalisina Navaraatri" was inspired from the Arabic artist Amr Diab's album Nour El Ain.

Track listing
| No. | Title | Lyrics | Singer(s) | Length |
|---|---|---|---|---|
| 1. | "Nadaka Kalisina Navaraatri" | Veturi | S. P. Balasubrahmanyam, K. S. Chithra, Swarnalatha | 4:27 |
| 2. | "Koosindhi Kanne Koyila" | Bhuvana Chandra | Mano, Sujatha | 5:10 |
| 3. | "Kanneellake Kanneelochhe" | Sirivennela Seetharama Sastry | S. P. Balasubrahmanyam, K. S. Chithra, Sujatha, Anupama, Renuka | 5:06 |
| 4. | "Misa Misa Merupula" | Chandra Bose | S. P. Balasubrahmanyam, K. S. Chithra | 4:50 |
| 5. | "Oh Kaalamaa" | Sirivennela Seetharama Sastry | K. J. Yesudas | 4:40 |
| 6. | "Prema Johar" | Sirivennela Seetharama Sastry | Mano, Murali | 6:06 |
| Total length: | | | | 30:34 |

== Reception ==
Andhra Today wrote, "Mega star Chiranjeevi dons a new role (after a year of hybernation) in sentimental drama as the big brother and guardian angel to five sisters. Despite many lacunae in the story and the plot, the movie has appealed to a large audience".

== Box office ==
Hitler was released on January 4, 1997, and emerged as a major commercial success. The film completed a theatrical run of over 100 days in multiple centres. To commemorate this milestone, a grand celebration was organized in Ongole, a town of personal significance to Chiranjeevi, as his father had once worked there.
