= Ravi Mohan =

Indian actor (born 1980)

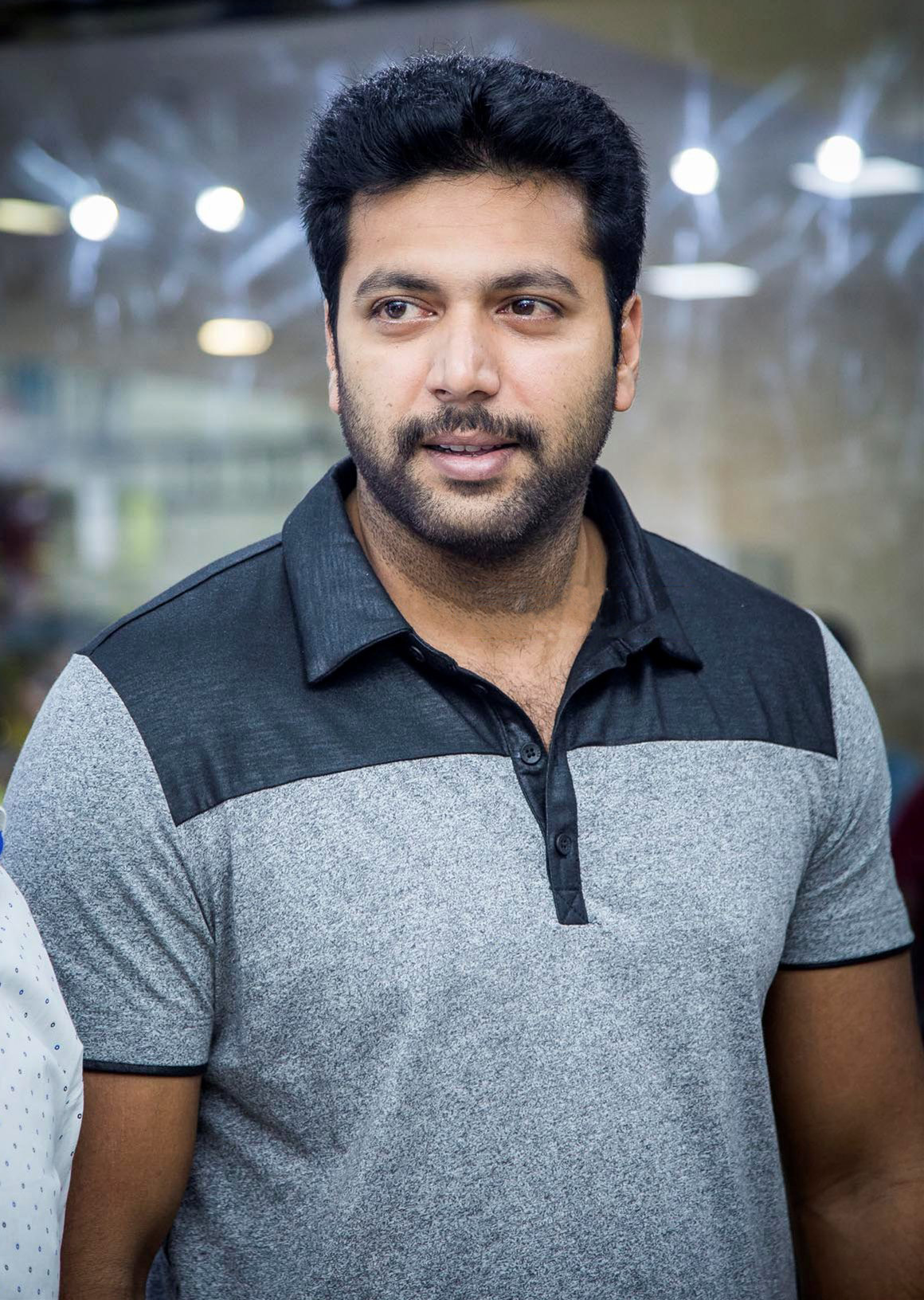
- Ravi at Naya Gadget shop launch
- Born: 10 September 1980 (age 46); Tirumangalam, Madurai, Tamil Nadu, India
- Other name: Jayam Ravi
- Education: Loyola College, Chennai
- Occupations: Actor; film director; producer
- Years active: 1989–present
- Organization: Ravi Mohan Studios
- Spouse: Aarthi Ravi (m. 2009; sep. 2024)
- Children: 2
- Father: A. Mohan
- Relatives: Mohan Raja (brother)

Ravi Mohan (born 10 September 1980), better known by his former stage name Jayam Ravi, is an Indian actor who works in Tamil cinema. The son of veteran film editor A. Mohan and younger brother of director Mohan Raja, Ravi made his lead acting debut in Raja's Jayam (2003), the success of which prompted the title to become a prefix to his stage name until 2025 when he dropped it. He has won one Tamil Nadu State Film Award and one Filmfare Award South and three SIIMA Awards respectively.

The success of Jayam made Ravi continue to collaborate with his brother for other films including M. Kumaran S/O Mahalakshmi (2004), Unakkum Enakkum (2006), Santhosh Subramaniam (2008) and Thani Oruvan (2015). He launched his own production company, Ravi Mohan Studios, and has produced various films.

== Early life and family ==
Ravi Mohan was born as M. Ravi in Tirumangalam, Madurai. His father is Editor Mohan, a Tamil, while his mother Varalakshmi is Telugu and from Hyderabad. His father was born as a Muslim while his mother is a Hindu. His elder brother, Mohan Raja, is a film director, with most of his films featuring Ravi in the lead role, while his sister, Roja, is a dentist. Ravi grew up in both Chennai and Hyderabad. He completed his schooling at Jawahar Vidyalaya in Ashok Nagar, Chennai. He studied dancing under the Bharatnatyam dancer Nalini Balakrishnan and performed his arangetram at the age of 12. After completing his degree in Visual Communication from Loyola College, Chennai, he decided to get into the film industry. He also trained in acting at the Kishore Namit Kapur Institute in Mumbai. Before debuting as an actor, Ravi had been an assistant director to Suresh Krishna for Aalavandhan (2001), starring Kamal Haasan.

== Acting career ==
=== 1989–2008: Debut and success ===
Ravi acted as a child actor in three films including two Telugu films: Oru Thottil Sabadham (1989), Bava Bavamaridi (1993) and Palnati Pourusham (1993), which were all produced by his father.

Ravi made his lead acting debut in the action-masala film Jayam, produced by his father and directed by his brother Mohan Raja. It was a remake of the 2002 Telugu film of the same name. His next venture was the sentimental drama M. Kumaran Son Of Mahalakshmi (2004), the remade version of the Telugu film Amma Nanna O Tamila Ammayi, in which he starred alongside Asin Thottumkal. Of Ravi's performance, a critic from Sify wrote that he "makes you want to see more of him", while The Hindu's Malathi Rangarajan noted that he came out with an "appreciable portrayal throughout". The film, considered a family entertainer, received the Tamil Nadu State Film Special Award for Best Film and fetched Ravi himself the Tamil Nadu State Film Award for Best Actor. It also emerged a financial success and he changed his stage name to Jayam Ravi.

His next release, Daas (2005), a romantic action, featured him as a football player. The film took an even bigger opening than his previous ones. Sify's reviewer described his performance as "impressive", calling Ravi a "hundred percent convincing as an action hero". Mazhai, a remake of the Telugu film Varsham, was his other release that year, which was "lukewarm" at the box office. In 2006, he starred in Saran's Idhayathirudan, which performed poorly at the box office, following which, he acted in Unakkum Enakkum (initially released and promoted as Something Something Unakkum Enakkum), again under his brother's direction in another remake of a Telugu film Nuvvostanante Nenoddantana. Ravi portrayed a rich, happy-go-lucky NRI from London, who has to live and fight for his love in dire conditions in a rural milieu. The film, which featured Trisha Krishnan alongside Ravi, became a high critical as well as financial success, emerging one of the highest-grossing and most-profitable films of the year. The N. Linguswamy-produced Deepavali under Ezhil's direction was released on 2007.

In 2008, Ravi appeared in three films. Following a cameo appearance in Velli Thirai, he acted in the family drama Santhosh Subramaniam, once again under his brother's direction in a remake. In the Tamil version of the 2006 Telugu film Bommarillu, starring opposite Genelia D'Souza, he played a young man, whose choices and wishes are continually subdued by his father. Ravi received a nomination for the Best Tamil Actor Award at the 56th Filmfare Awards South. Next, he starred in the action thriller Dhaam Dhoom, directed by cinematographer-director Jeeva, who died in the midst of the film's shooting in Russia. Completed by Jeeva's assistant Manikandan, his wife Aneez Tanveer and his guru P. C. Sreeram, Dhaam Dhoom released in mid-2008 in which he portrayed Gautham Subramaniyam, a man accused in a murder he did not commit. Sify's reviewer wrote that he was "simply amazing in his role", label the film as an "out and out Jayam Ravi movie".

=== 2009–2019: Action and comedy roles ===
In 2009, Ravi starred in the action-adventure film Peraanmai. In 2010, he starred in the action-comedy Thillalangadi, a remake of the 2009 Telugu-language film Kick. In 2011, he starred in the romantic drama Engeyum Kaadhal. In 2013, he starred in the action film Ameerin Aadhi-Bhagavan. In 2014, he starred in the action film Nimirndhu Nil, which was also shot simultaneously in Telugu as Janda Pai Kapiraju with Nani in the lead.

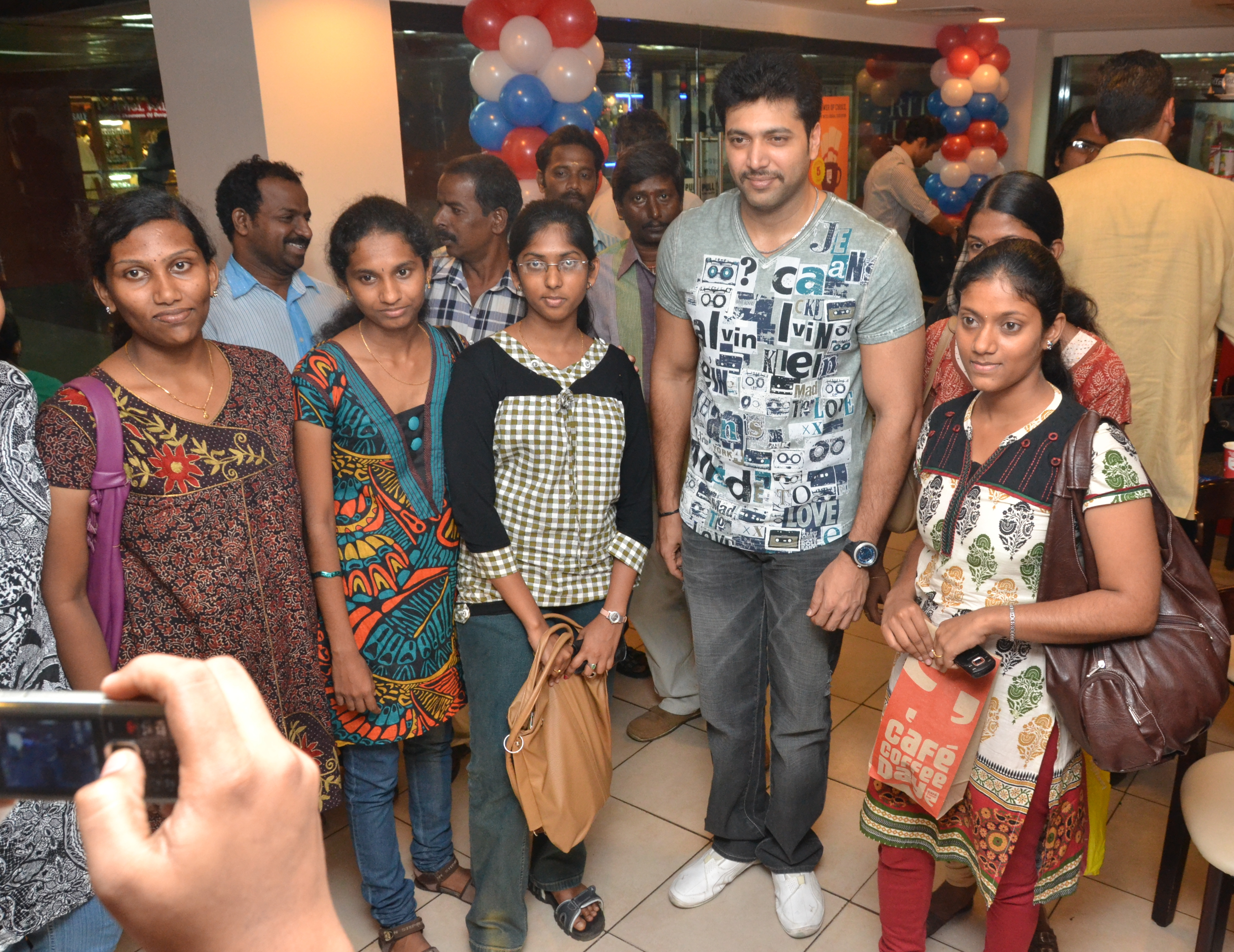
Ravi seen with his fans at an event in Chennai

In 2015, Ravi appeared in four films: the romantic comedy Romeo Juliet, the action-comedy Sakalakala Vallavan, the action-thriller Thani Oruvan (directed by his brother Mohan Raja) and the sports action film Bhooloham. In 2016, he starred in the action-horror film Miruthan revolving around a zombie apocalypse. In 2017, he appeared in the action-thriller Bogan (reuniting with actor Arvind Swami after Thani Oruvan) and the action-adventure film Vanamagan.

In 2018, he starred in the sci-fi action film Tik Tik Tik (considered as India's first space film) and the action-thriller Adanga Maru. In 2019, he made a cameo in the adventure film Thumbaa and starred as the lead in the comedy film Comali.

=== 2021–present: Professional expansion ===
After a two-year absence from the big screen, Ravi made his debut on OTT platforms with his 25th film, Bhoomi, in 2021. The film was initially supposed to release in theatres but was instead released on OTT due to the COVID-19 pandemic in India. In 2022, he was seen in Mani Ratnam's Ponniyin Selvan as Arulmozhivarman who later became the Chola Emperor Raja Raja Chola. The second part was Ponniyin Selvan: II released in 2023. He appeared in the revenge film Siren, followed by the comedy drama film Brother, which was released in 2024.

In 2025, Ravi Mohan founded his own production house, Ravi Mohan Studios. The company has produced and distributed several films and television series under its banner, all of which featured Mohan in acting roles. Some of these films include Bro Club, An Ordinary Man and Khaaki Squad. In 2026, he starred in the political action drama Parasakthi, which was released in 2026. On 16 May 2026, Ravi announced an indefinite hiatus from acting until his marital issues ended. However, later the same month, he began filming for Benz.

== Personal life ==
Ravi married Aarti, daughter of film producer Sujatha Vijayakumar, in 2009. They have two sons, Aarav and Ayaan. Aarav appeared alongside his father in the film Tik Tik Tik (2018). Ravi and Aarthi separated in September 2024.

After Ravi Mohan addressed the media about his divorce from Aarti Ravi, Aarti’s mother shared her response. As reported by Indian Express, at a recent event, Sujatha referred to an earlier interview and said it contains important details about how the marriage took place. "There was an interview in Vikatan magazine in 2008 that explained this. I am looking for it now. It reveals who got blackmailed and who cut their wrists to get married”.

In January 2025, he changed his stage name to his real name, Ravi Mohan.

== Filmography ==
Key
†	Denotes films that have not yet been released

- All films are in Tamil, unless otherwise noted.

=== As actor ===
Year	Title	Role(s)	Notes	Ref.
1989	Oru Thottil Sabadham	—N/a	Child artist	
1993	Bava Bavamaridi	Young Raju	Telugu films; Child artist	
1994	Palnati Pourusham	Young Bheemineni Brahmanna	Telugu films; Child artist	
2003	Jayam	Ravi	credited as Ravi M.	
2004	M. Kumaran Son of Mahalakshmi	M. Kumaran		
2005	Daas	Antony Daas		
2005	Mazhai	Arjun		
2006	Idhayathirudan	Mahesh Aalwar		
2006	Unakkum Enakkum	Santhosh		
2007	Deepavali	Billu Mudaliar		
2008	Velli Thirai	Himself	Guest appearance	
2008	Santhosh Subramaniyam	Santhosh Subramaniyam		
2008	Dhaam Dhoom	Gautham Subramaniam		
2009	Peraanmai	R. Duruvan		
2010	Thillalangadi	Krishna (Thillalangadi)		
2011	Ko	Himself	Guest appearance	
2011	Engeyum Kadhal	R. Kamal		
2013	Ameerin Aadhi-Bhagavan	Aadhi Shanmugam, Baghavan Bhai (Note: Jayam Ravi played two characters.)	Dual role	
2014	Ninaithathu Yaaro	Himself	Guest appearance	
2014	Nimirndhu Nil	Aravindan Sivasamy, Narasimha Reddy	Dual role	
2015	Janda Pai Kapiraju	Himself	Telugu film; Guest appearance	
2015	Romeo Juliet	Karthik		
2015	Sakalakala Vallavan	Shakthi		
2015	Thani Oruvan	ASP Mithran IPS		
2015	Bhooloham	Bhooloham		
2016	Miruthan	SI Karthik		
2017	Bogan	ACP Vikram IPS		
2017	Vanamagan	Jara (K. Vaasi)		
2018	Tik Tik Tik	M. Vasudevan (Vasu)		
2018	Adanga Maru	SI Subhash		
2019	Thumbaa	John	Cameo appearance	
2019	Comali	Ravi		
2021	Bhoomi	Bhoominathan	25th film	
2022	Ponniyin Selvan: I	Arulmozhi Varman		
2023	Agilan	Agilan, Nandha	Dual role	
2023	Ponniyin Selvan: II	Arulmozhi Varman		
2023	Iraivan	ACP Arjun IPS		
2024	Siren	Thilagan		
2024	Brother	Karthik Kumarasamy		
2025	Kadhalika Neramillai	Siddharth "Sid"		
2026	Parasakthi	Thirunaadan		
2026	Karathey Babu	K. Shanmugam Babu (Karathey Babu)		
TBA	Bro Club †	TBA	Filming	
TBA	Genie †	TBA	Delayed	

=== As director ===
Year	Film	Notes	Ref.
TBA	An Ordinary Man †	Directorial debut	

=== As producer ===
Year	Title	Director	Ref.
TBA	Bro Club †	Karthik Yogi	
TBA	An Ordinary Man †	Himself	

=== As distributor ===
Year	Title	Director	Notes	Ref.
TBA	Khaaki Squad †	S. P. Shakthivel	As presenter	

=== As assistant director ===
Year	Title	Director	Ref.
2001	Aalavandhan	Suresh Krissna	

== Television ==
Year	Title	Role	Network	Notes
2024	Super Singer Season 10	Guest	Star Vijay	
2024	Jodi Are U Ready	Guest	Star Vijay	
2024	Nayanthara: Beyond the Fairytale	Himself	Netflix	Documentary film

== Awards and nominations ==
Year	Category	Award	Film	Result	Ref.
2004	Best Actor	Tamil Nadu State Film Awards	M. Kumaran Son Of Mahalakshmi	Won	
2008	Best Actor	Vijay Awards	Santosh Subramaniam	Nominated	
2008	Best Actor – Tamil	Filmfare Awards South	Santosh Subramaniam	Nominated	
2009	Best Actor	Edison Awards	Peraanmai	Won	
2009	Best Actor	Vijay Awards	Peraanmai	Nominated	
2009	Best Actor – Tamil	Filmfare Awards South	Peraanmai	Nominated	
2015	Most Romantic Star of South Indian Cinema	SIIMA Awards	Romeo Juliet	Won	
2015	Best Actor	Edison Awards	Thani Oruvan	Won	
2015	Performance In A Leading Role – Male	IIFA Utsavam	Thani Oruvan	Won	
2015	Best Actor (Critics) – South	Filmfare Awards	Thani Oruvan	Won	
2015	Best Actor – Tamil	Filmfare Awards South	Thani Oruvan	Nominated	
2015	Best Actor	SIIMA Awards	Thani Oruvan	Nominated	
2015	Best Actor (Critics)	SIIMA Awards	Thani Oruvan	Won	
2015	Best Actor	Vikatan Awards	Bhooloham	Won	
2018	Best Actor - Tamil	Filmfare Awards South	Adanga Maru	Nominated	
2018	Best Actor (Critics)	SIIMA Awards	Adanga Maru	Won	
2018	Best Actor	SIIMA Awards	Adanga Maru	Nominated	

=== Honours ===
- Kalaimamani Award - 2006
