= Unakkum Enakkum =

- Theatrical poster
- Directed by: M. Raja
- Screenplay by: M. Raja
- Story by: Veeru Potla
- Based on: Nuvvostanante Nenoddantana (2005)
- Produced by: T. Rama Rao; M. Raja
- Starring: Ravi Mohan; Trisha; Prabhu
- Cinematography: Venkatesh Anguraj
- Edited by: S. Surajkavee
- Music by: Devi Sri Prasad
- Production companies: Sri Lakshmi Productions; Jayam Company
- Release date: 28 July 2006
- Running time: 175 minutes
- Country: India
- Language: Tamil

Unakkum Enakkum (Something Something) is a 2006 Indian Tamil-language romantic comedy film directed by M. Raja. A remake of the Telugu film Nuvvostanante Nenoddantana (2005), it stars Ravi Mohan (credited as Jayam Ravi), Trisha (who reprises her role in the original), and Prabhu with an ensemble cast that includes Richa Pallod, K. Bhagyaraj, Geetha and comedians Santhanam and Ganja Karuppu in supporting roles. The score and soundtrack were composed by Devi Sri Prasad, who also scored the music in the original version of the film, whilst cinematography was handled by A. Venkatesh and editing by S. Suraj Kavee.

== Plot ==
Santhosh was the only son of a London-settled Tamil business tycoon named Krishnan and Janaki. He came to Chennai along with Janaki to attend the wedding of his cousin Lalitha alias Lalli's wedding. Lalli was Kavitha's best friend, and she too came to Chennai a few days before the wedding. Santhosh, a fun-loving person, developed an attraction immediately after seeing Kavitha, but Kavitha didn't reciprocate his feelings, and maintained a distance with Santhosh.

Slowly, Santhosh and Kavitha became good friends, and love later blossomed between them. Shalini alias Shalu was the daughter of Santhosh’s uncle Ravichandran's friend Jagadhalapradhaban alias JP, and she developed an infatuation towards Santhosh. Janaki got furious knowing about Santhosh and Kavitha’s love affair, as she thought that Kavitha was poor and from low societal status. On the day of Lalli’s wedding when they sent Santhosh away to buy some gifts for Lalli, Janaki and JP spoke ill of Kavitha and asked her to leave the place before Santhosh's return. When Kavitha was about to leave the place, Muthupandi suddenly arrived with his friend Karuppayya and was shocked to see her condition. He got angry, scolded everyone there for hurting his sister, and also took her back to Panpoli. Santhosh, who was still upset as Kavitha left him, learnt from Lalli what has happened the previous day. He went to the room where Kavitha stayed and found her horse clay doll, her favourite doll which Muthupandi made for her and modified by Santhosh after Shalu broke it out of anger and jealousy. While waiting for a connecting flight in Dubai, Santhosh escaped from Janaki and went back to Tenkasi instead, with the idea of heading to Kavitha's village. When he arrived in the village, everyone got shocked. Muthupandi didn't like Santhosh because of Janaki’s attitude and thought that he too would ill-treat Kavitha in the future.

Santhosh apologized to Muthupandi for the misunderstandings and requested him to get Kavitha married to him. Hence Muthupandi came with a challenge. He allotted an acre of agricultural land to Santhosh and asked him to do farming there. Santhosh, in order to prove his love for Kavitha, challenged him that he would cultivate one more bundle in the end. When Muthupandi agreed, Santhosh started work, although he didn't know farming. Santhosh tried hard to do farming, and somehow, he managed to learn cultivation. Krishnan came to Tenkasi to confront Kavitha and Muthpandi and bring back Santhosh. He saw Santhosh living a typical farmer's life, and eating plain rice with chili powder and got triggered emotionally. He tried to convince Santhosh and asked him to come back to London. When Santhosh said that he believed in his love for Kavitha and didn't wish to return, Krishnan went to confront Kavitha, who was the cause for his son's condition.

Krishnan overheard Kavitha's conversation with her servant and realized that she too had been sleeping on the floor despite cold conditions and proper bed and was eating the same food as Santhosh. Krishnan felt overwhelmed thinking about the young lovers and blessed Kavitha. He also told her that their true love would win and asked her to stay strong.

Meanwhile, JP and Shalu wanted Santhosh to lose so that he would return. They sought help from a local goon named "Mark" Mayandi to distract Santhosh. Also, there was a factionist named Sivaji, a local rich man in the village. His son wanted to marry Kavitha at any cost. The cultivation was completed, and rice grains were bundled in both Santhosh and Muthupandi’s farms.

One night, when Sivaji's son tried to burn Santhosh's land, it backfired, and Mayandi intervened the chaos and got burned on his back. He also set the shed on fire where Santhosh was staying. Everyone tried to extinguish the fire and Santhosh rescued Muthupandi from a near accident due to the fire. Also, he saved Kavitha’s horse doll. On the day before the counting, Mayandi took a few bundles from Santhosh and placed it along with Muthupandi’s so that Santhosh would lose the challenge. The next day, Muthupandi revealed to his guardian, a railway manager that he added extra bundles in Santhosh's so that he could win. He also revealed that Santhosh was the right match for his sister. Santhosh won the challenge as he had cultivated more compared to Muthupandi, following which he agreed for their wedding.

Sivaji and his son got angry upon seeing this. His son planned to forcefully marry Kavitha. JP and Mayandi also got angry, and they plotted to murder Muthupandi. They kidnapped Kavitha but were beaten up by Santhosh and Muthupandi. A fight erupted in which Sivaji’s son was killed by Santhosh, who saved Kavitha, while JP and Sivaji were violently defeated by Muthupandi. When police arrived at the spot, Muthupandi took the blame for the murder and requested Santhosh to marry Kavitha and lead a happy life. He got jailed for seven years.

Now Muthupandi finishes telling his story, and the officer is surprised at his upright personality. When he asks him why he is telling the truth a day before completing his sentence, Muthupandi says that he wants his sister to stay happy forever with the man she loves. The officer feels proud of him and blesses him.

When Muthupandi gets released, he gets shocked upon seeing Santhosh and Kavitha still unmarried and waiting for him in wedding attire. Santhosh and Kavitha were waiting to conduct the marriage only after Muthupandi is released. Muthupandi feels proud of them. Also, Janaki realizes her mistake and apologizes to Muthupandi. In the end, Santhosh and Kavitha are married. Also, it is hinted that Muthupandi and his servant maid Valli finally develop love for each other.

== Cast ==
- Ravi Mohan as Santhosh
- Trisha as Kavitha, Muthupandi's younger sister and Santhosh's love interest, later wife
- Prabhu as Muthupandi, Kavitha's elder brother
  - Walter Philips as young Muthupandi
- K. Bhagyaraj as Krishnan, Santhosh's father
- Richa Pallod as Lalitha "Lalli", Kavitha's best friend and Santhosh's cousin
- Geetha as Parvathi, Santhosh's mother
- Santhanam as Arivu, Santhosh and Lalitha's cousin
- Cochin Hanifa as Ravichandran, Lalitha's father and Santhosh's maternal uncle
- Manivannan as Jagadhalapradhaban "JP", Ravichandran's friend
- Tejashree as Shalini "Shalu", JP's daughter
- Kalabhavan Mani as "Mark" Mayandi, a local goon
- Livingston as Lalitha's father-in-law
- Kadhal Dhandapani as Sivaji, a rich man
- Mallika as Valli, Muthupandi's love interest, later wife
- Ganja Karuppu as Karuppayya, Muthupandi's friend
- Kadhal Arun Kumar as Kaaka
- T. S. B. K. Moulee as Krishnayya, railway station master
- Vijayakumar as a police officer
- Aravind Akash as Lalli's blackmailer
- Sriranjani as Santhi, Muthupandi's and Kavitha's mother
- Sachu as Santhosh and Lalitha's grandmother
- Nancy Jennifer as Santhosh's and Lalitha's cousin
- O. A. K. Sundar as Muthupandi and Kavitha's father
- Bava Lakshmanan as Vellaipani, Mayandi's follower
- Kottachi as Mayandi's follower
- Visweswara Rao as Marriage priest
- Japan Kumar as party guest

== Production ==
After two successful remakes, M. Raja opted to remake the Telugu film Nuvvostanante Nenoddantana (2005) with his brother Ravi in lead role alongside Trisha reprised her role from original. Prabhu was signed on to play Trisha's brother after unsuccessful negotiations with several other actors. Mohan was offered the role of Ravi's father, but he declined and the role went to K. Bhagyaraj.

The film was launched on 31 August 2005 at AVM Studios. The first schedule took place at Chennai while the second schedule took place at Dindigul and the filming was also held at Courtalam, Tenkasi, Palani and Ambasamudram within 70 days. The song "Pooparikka Neeyum", the scenes of Trisha were shot at Kodaikanal, Kutralam, Ambasamudram, Rajapalayam, Tenkasi, Sivagiri and Keezhpuliyur while the scenes of Jayam Ravi was shot at London streets and Dubai airport. The romantic song "Un Paarvaiyil" on lead pair was picturised at bungalows such as ECR Road bungalow, Eden Garden House, Sneha House and the Gupta House. The song "Something Something" was shot at a set at Chennai Studios while "Kiliye Kiliye" was shot at Kithanayankottai, Aathur, Salem, Courtallam, Ambasamudram, Sivagiri and Tenkasi with 50 bullock carts and "Aagayam" was shot on sets put up at a 50-acre area in a village Sithayaiyan near Aathur off Dindigul.

The film was initially titled Something Something Unakkum Enakkum, but removed the English prefixes to exploit the Tamil Nadu Government's then rule of entertainment tax exemption for films with Tamil titles.

== Music ==
The film has six songs composed by Devi Sri Prasad who retained and reused all the tunes from the original Telugu film except for "Paripoke Pitta", which was replaced with "Kozhi Veda Kozhi".

Song	Singers	Lyrics
"Aagayam"	S. P. Balasubrahmanyam	Na. Muthukumar
"Kozhi Veda Kozhi"	Naveen, Priya Himesh	Viveka
"Pooparikka Neeyum"	Shankar Mahadevan	Na. Muthukumar
"Kiliye Kiliye"	Jassie Gift	Na. Muthukumar
"Something Something"	Tippu	P. Vijay
"Un Paarvaiyil"	Karthik, Sumangali	Kabilan

== Release and reception ==
The film was released on 28 July 2006. Sify said the film was "like a saccharine coated candy floss champion that is superbly packaged". The Hindu stated "Raja has a way of making remakes successful". Malini Mannath of Chennai Online wrote, "A wholesome, clean family entertainer, 'Unakkum Enakkum Something Something' is a feel-good film that keeps one engaged with its judicious blend of sentiment, action, humour and romance". Cinesouth wrote, "With a whole battalion of stars, director Raja has delivered a nice story narrated intelligently. Hopefully, he will continue his good work in his next project too". However Lajjavathi of Kalki gave a mixed review, citing Jayam Unit can at least try to meet the fans next time with a new story, new characters and different visual settings. The venture went on to become profitable, and scored the third straight success for the actor-director duo.
