= Ravi Hutheesing =

American singer-songwriter, guitarist, cultural diplomat (born 1971)

Ravi Ajit Hutheesing
- Born: May 30, 1971 (age 54); Washington, D.C., U.S.
- Occupations: Global keynote speaker, Musician, Aviator, Cultural diplomat
- Parent: Ajit Hutheesing
- Relatives: Nehru-Gandhi family
- Website: raviunites.com

Ravi Ajit Hutheesing (born 30 May 1971) is an American keynote speaker, cultural diplomat serving the US Department of State, singer-songwriter, and former guitarist for the band Hanson, writer, and pilot. He is also a member of the Nehru-Gandhi family. By ancestry, he's both Indian and German (through his London-born, half-German/half-Indian ancestry mother Amrita).

He is the youngest son of Ajit Hutheesing, founder, chairman and chief executive officer of International Capital Partners Inc, and a member of the Nehru-Gandhi family. He is of Gujarati and Kashmiri descent.

== Career ==
Hutheesing is a keynote speaker primarily addressing the education industry globally. International Baccalaureate Organization, American Association of School Administrators, Association of Supervision and Curriculum Development are just a few of his keynote clients.

Hutheesing was a guitarist for Hanson (Mercury/Polygram) in 1997 when they reached #1 on the Billboard Charts and were nominated for three Grammy awards. They appeared on the Late Show with David Letterman, The Tonight Show with Jay Leno, The Rosie O'Donnell Show, Saturday Night Live, Good Morning America, Today, and several other national television shows, and also performed at Madison Square Garden and a White House Christmas party.

He has performed with his own band at the Louisiana Superdome and multiple festivals around the country, and has released two CDs entitled "Beyond the Blur" and "Ravi." Electronic Musician, Music Inc., Music & Sound Retailer, Musician, On Stage, and Flight Training magazines have published his articles. Simon and Schuster published Ravi's tour journal, "Dancin with Hanson" in 1999.

Also an aviator, Hutheesing discovered that 50% of pilots play a musical instrument. Yet, the aviation industry was not using music to attract millennials and help reverse the shrinking pilot population (millennials prioritize music). "The Raviator" created a niche market within aviation by performing concerts at air shows, becoming the spokesman for products targeting pilots, and developing a signature model folding guitar to fit in small airplanes.

Hutheesing partners with the Shanti Bhavan Children's Project in Tamil Nadu India, and is working with The George Foundation to spearhead the creation of more schools for the poorest of the poor ("untouchables" caste).

In 2018, Ravi launched Ravi Unites Schools—a growing network of over 100 schools worldwide that participate in real-time audio-video interactions between student groups, hosted by Ravi. He believes that such exchanges promote world peace by enabling youth to bond naturally across geographical and socioeconomic boundaries rather than to succumb to implicit biases formed by institutional agendas.

Ravi began serving as a cultural diplomat for the US Department of State in 2015, giving presentations on entrepreneurship and youth leadership in Russia. In 2016, he went to Indonesia and created songwriting and cultural entrepreneurship programs that bridged the most severe cultural and religious divides, and in 2017, he created similar programs in Iraq and Lebanon which included students from Mosul liberated from ISIS just days earlier, and Syrians from the decimated city of Aleppo.

== Works ==
- Hanson: Tulsa Tokyo & the Middle of Nowhere (Long Form Video, Mercury/Polygram), 1997
- Ravi (CD, Suburban Turban), 1998
- Brian Moore Artist Series Volume 1 (CD, Brian Moore Guitars), 1998
- Beyond the Blur (CD, Suburban Turban), 1999
- Dancin' With Hanson (Book, Simon & Schuster), 1999. ISBN 0-671-03598-3.
- Learn Guitar in 21 Days (DVD, Truefire/GuitarLab/eMedia), 2009
- Guitarology (DVD, Truefire/GuitarLab), 2011
- Rock/Pop Progressions You Must Know (DVD, Truefire/GuitarLab), 2011
- 1-2-3 Songwriting (DVD, Truefire), 2013
