= Mohan Raja =

Indian film director and screenwriter

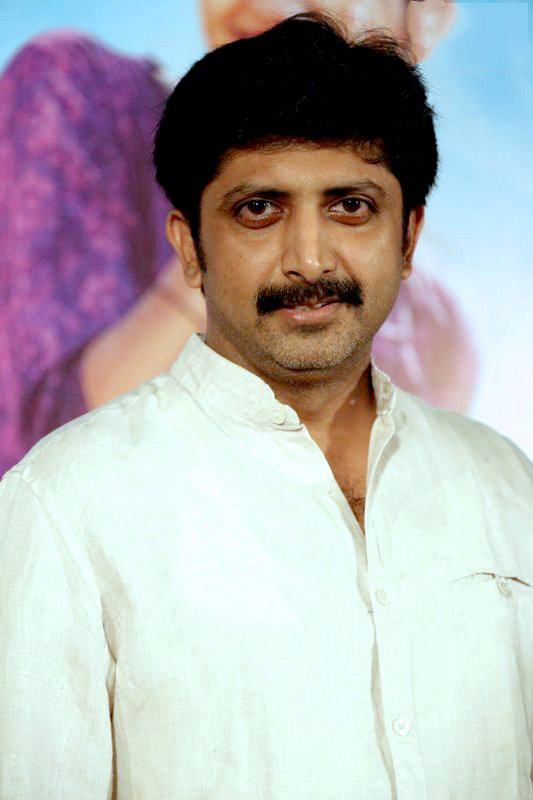
- Born: Madurai, Tamil Nadu, India
- Occupations: Film director; Screenwriter
- Years active: 1998–present
- Children: 2
- Father: Editor Mohan
- Relatives: Ravi Mohan (brother)

Mohan Raja, also known and credited as M. Raja, is an Indian film director and screenwriter who primarily works in Tamil and Telugu film industries. After making his debut in the Telugu film Hanuman Junction (2001), he went on to remake several successful Telugu films into Tamil, beginning with Jayam (2003) which also launched his brother Ravi as a leading actor. Raja then collaborated with Ravi for three consecutive commercially successful films, M. Kumaran S/O Mahalakshmi (2004), Something Something... Unakkum Enakkum (2006) and Santosh Subramaniam (2008), all of which were remakes of successful Telugu films. After a period of mixed success, he returned with his first original script, Thani Oruvan (2015) which went on to become one of the most profitable Tamil films of 2015.

== Early life ==
Raja's father, Mohan, was the adopted son of actor K. A. Thangavelu. Mohan is a well known film editor in the Tamil industry. Raja has a brother, Ravi Mohan, and a sister.

== Career ==
=== 1998–2004: Early career and initial success ===
As a result of his father Editor Mohan's involvement in the film industry, Raja regularly visited Vauhini Studios as a teenager to watch his father work as a film editor. Likewise, Raja's role as the president of the Dubbing Film Producers Association meant that Raja was exposed to world cinema, before he attended the Film Institute to complete his education. He made his directorial debut through the Telugu action comedy film Hanuman Junction (2001), a remake of the Malayalam film Thenkasipattanam (2000). Featuring an ensemble cast led by Arjun and Jagapathi Babu. Raja won positive reviews for his work, with Jeevi of Idlebrain.com stating "credit goes to Raja for narrating the story in such a way that all the viewers understand the complex and randomly changing relationships clearly" and that "the film looks solid in most of the scenes", while adding that Raja knows "the mass pulse". Raja then moved on to make his first Tamil film, Jayam (2003), which was a remake of the successful 2002 Telugu film of the same name. A romantic thriller set in a village, the film was produced by Raja's father Mohan and starred his younger brother Ravi in the lead role alongside Sadha, who acted in the original version. Jayam opened to mixed reviews, with a critic from The Hindu stating the film gave a sense of "déjà vu" but added that Raja's "treatment is interesting in patches". The film went on to become a surprise success at the box office, and prompted Ravi to adopt "Jayam" to his stage name as a prefix, while their home production studio was renamed Jayam Company.

Raja then worked with his father and brother on the production of M. Kumaran S/O Mahalakshmi (2004), a remake of the Telugu film Amma Nanna O Tamila Ammayi (2003). Nadhiya made a comeback to Tamil films by portraying Ravi's mother. The film opened in October 2004 to positive reviews, with Behindwoods.com stating "Raja has done well for his second film" and "he has well defined the relationship between a mother and a son in this movie", while The Hindu wrote that "casting is a main draw", praising Nadhiya's inclusion. Rediff.com also listed the film amongst the "best Tamil films of 2004", stating that the film was "a big success". Like Jayam, M. Kumaran S/O Mahalakshmi went on to become another highly profitable venture at the box office for the production house. Following the success of the film, Ravi signed on for films directed by different filmmakers, while Raja also stated he was looking to work for other production houses.

=== 2006–2010: Further remakes ===
Raja did not sign on to make any further films, while Ravi experienced two consecutive box office failures after the success of their last collaboration. Subsequently, the duo came together for another home production titled Something Something... Unakkum Enakkum (2006), which would be a remake of Prabhu Deva's successful Telugu film, Nuvvostanante Nenoddantana. (2005). A family drama focusing on the relationship between a brother and a sister, the film told the story of how a city-bred youngster attempts to please his lover's brother. The film opened to positive reviews in July 2006, with Behindwoods.com noting Raja "should be applauded for hand picking a cast that makes the movie worth watching", while remarking that "it has everything that can well set the box office collections soaring". Likewise Sify added the film was "like a saccharine coated candy floss champion that is superbly packaged" and The Hindu stated "Raja has a way of making remakes successful". The venture went on to become profitable, and scored the third straight success for the actor-director duo. He was then signed on by Gemini Film Circuit to remake Rajkumar Hirani's Hindi film Lage Raho Munna Bhai (2006) into Tamil, but the project failed to materialise.

Raja next began work on the family drama film Santosh Subramaniam (2008), a remake of the Telugu film Bommarillu (2006), after outbidding several other interested parties for the remake rights. The film's original version was made by Raja's friend Bhaskar, who also stated that Raja would be the most apt director to remake the film into the Tamil language. Ravi and Prakash Raj were chosen again to play lead roles, while Genelia D'Souza was selected as the film's heroine, after winning acclaim for her portrayal of the role in the original version. The film revolved around a father-son relationship where the son's choices and his ambitions to achieve something in life are subdued by his father, and Raja related the storyline back to his personal life. Santosh Subramaniam opened to positive reviews from critics, with Raja winning critical acclaim for his work. A critic from Sify.com noted "Raja, a past master at remakes, is once again a winner" and that the film "has simple charm, immensely likeable characters, and the intrinsic humour in the writing makes it a must watch". Similarly, a critic from The Hindu noted "for the fourth time in succession film-maker Raja shows he can re-make a film to suit the audiences here", stating the script was "aptly re-tuned to suit the Tamil milieu". The film also went on to be ranked amongst the Best Tamil films of the year by the Tamil Nadu State, while it also garnered four Filmfare Award nominations, including one for Best Film. Moreover, it became a very profitable venture for the makers, running for over 100 days in theatres across Tamil Nadu. The producers, AGS Entertainment, subsequently requested Raja to make another film with Ravi after Santosh Subramaniam's success, but Raja gave Ravi's dates to director Prabhu Deva to film Engeyum Kaadhal (2011).

=== 2010–2015: Mixed success ===
After five consecutive successful films, Raja chose to remake the Telugu comedy film, Kick (2009) into Tamil as Thillalangadi (2010), with Ravi in the lead role. The remake rights were purchased for "astronomical sum", a month after the Telugu film's release by Raja's father Mohan, who was set to produce the film. The film began production in mid-2009 and was shot extensively across Malaysia, with Tamannaah and Shaam signed on to play supporting roles. The film opened to mixed-to-negative reviews, unlike the original version, whilst Sify.com rated the film as "below average" film and added that it was "boring". Pavithra Srinivasan from Rediff.com cited the film as a "ridiculous pot-boiler" and criticised Ravi's performance as "lacking punch" and also drew criticism to the "wafer-thin story line", giving the film a mere 1.5 out of 5. Behindwoods.com cited "Raja's narration is interesting but is way too long", adding that "the ‘family’ feel which is generally present in Raja's films is missing in Thillalangadi". The film became Raja's first venture to gain predominantly negative reviews, but the film had an average run at the box office.

In late 2009, Raja agreed terms to work with actor Vijay, and spent ten months writing a script based on a story written by director Thirupathisamy in the early 2000s. Thirupathisamy had gone on to make the story into a Telugu film titled Azad (2000), while also began pre-production work to remake it in Tamil as Velan with Vijay and Priyanka Chopra in 2001, before he died later that year. Raja subsequently bought the remake rights and reworked the script of Azad to suit Tamil audiences and signed on Genelia D'Souza and Hansika Motwani to play other lead roles. The film, which was retitled Velayudham, became Raja's first Tamil venture which did not include his brother in the cast and while writing the script, Raja analysed Vijay's popularity amongst children and women audience to insert certain scenes into the script. The film told the tale of a milkman who turns into a vigilante, with a human interest story as a backdrop. The film opened to positive reviews and became the third highest grossing Tamil film of 2011. A critic from Behindwoods.com noted "Raja has done a fine job of mixing all the elements that go towards making a mass hero film, though he has lost the balance a bit in the last hour", while Rediff.com noted it is "a masala entertainer that doesn't require you to tax your brain cells". In early 2012, Raja began pre-production on remaking the Tamil film Ramanaa (2002) into Hindi with Akshay Kumar and Tamannaah in the lead roles. He later opted out of the film after it went through delays and was not involved in the subsequent remake titled Gabbar Is Back (2015). Raja then briefly forayed into acting and played the father of quadruplets in the comedy thriller, Enna Satham Indha Neram (2014), directed by his friend, Guru Ramesh. Raja shot for the film for six days in Chennai, but the film had a low-key opening at the box office.

=== 2015–present: Thani Oruvan (2015) and recent work ===
After taking a sabbatical, Raja began working on his first original script for the production house AGS Entertainment in late 2012 and was helped by the writer duo Subha. He worked on the script of Thani Oruvan (2015) for nine months, and revealed that it was based on an original idea about "a man who goes all out to hunt evil in society". He added that in "formulaic Tamil films", the protagonist would require a flashback to show a reason to fight evil or that the "hero would wait for the villain to make the first move", but noted that Thani Oruvan would eschew those typical notions seen in Tamil films. He considered several actors for the lead role but finally chose his brother again as he wanted an actor "who would trust him blindly" because he had wanted the film to be a "career-changing film". After unsuccessful negotiations with Arya and Madhavan, Raja cast Arvind Swamy in the role of the main antagonist because he wanted "an actor whose attractiveness would act as a distraction from his evilness". Raja called the film "experimental" and "close to his heart", revealing the efforts he put into the pre-production of the project. The film began production in late 2013 and took a year and a half to complete shoot, with several delays during production. The making of the film was marred with the troubles of the original composer backing out, Sun Pictures cancelling their film distribution contract, and a spat between the director and the lead actress, Nayanthara. As a result of the delays, Raja and Ravi decided to forgo their salaries for the last schedule to ensure the budget stopped escalating. The film opened in August 2015 to unanimously positive reviews, with Rediff.com noting that the script was "highly intelligent, racy and well-polished script that is perfectly executed" and added it has "flawless execution by the director that deserves all the credit". Likewise Sify.com called the film a "taut, intelligent, and deliciously twisted action drama", while The Times of India praised the "sleek filmmaking". The Hindu stated the film was a "pretty smart, pulpy thriller" and wrote it has "more style than you expect in a Mohan Raja movie". The film subsequently went on to become one of the most profitable Tamil films of 2015, as well as the biggest successes in the careers of Raja and Ravi. Raja then directed another film, Velaikkaran starring Sivakarthikeyan, Nayanthara and Fahadh Faasil in the lead roles. This film, being his second original film after Thani Oruvan, was released in 2017 and was a box office success. In 2022, Raja returned to remakes with Godfather, the Telugu remake of the Malayalam film Lucifer (2019), which marked his return to Telugu cinema after 20 years.

== Craft, style, and technical collaborations ==
Raja has mostly worked on Tamil remakes of Telugu films, leading to the media nicknaming him "Remake Raja" or "Xerox Raja". He has stated, "Remakes aren't easy. Taking up a proven hit and making it succeed again is a challenge." While other filmmakers in Tamil cinema have often taken to plagiarism without acknowledging the source material, Raja has only worked on officially approved remake projects, and his first six directed films were credited to other writers. He works with his team of assistants to blend in changes to the script to suit the culture of Tamil audiences and thrashes out every single shot from the original version to add or subtract sequences. Raja has been praised for his casting decisions for putting Nadhiya in a comeback role as a young mother in M. Kumaran Son of Mahalakshmi and for casting Asin as the film's heroine. Meanwhile, he gave Prabhu a supporting role as a brother in Unakkum Enakkum, marking an early foray away from lead roles for Prabhu, which won him acclaim from critics. Likewise, his decision to cast Arvind Swamy as an antagonist in Thani Oruvan because of his "attractiveness" also received acclaim, following the film's success.

Raja has often attempted to make films for family entertainment, and revealed that progressively since Jayam, he has attempted to reduce scenes of glamour and vulgarity. He has also stated his intentions of appealing to all sectors of the audience and has revealed that films such as Samsaram Adhu Minsaram (1986) and Kadhalukku Mariyadhai (1997) are amongst the types of films that he aspires to make.

=== Frequent collaborators ===
Collaborator	Hanuman Junction; (2001)	Jayam; (2003)	M. Kumaran Son of Mahalakshmi; (2004)	Unakkum Enakkum; (2006)	Santosh Subramaniam; (2008)	Thillalangadi; (2010)	Velayudham; (2011)	Thani Oruvan; (2015)	Velaikkaran; (2017)	Godfather; (2022)
Ravi Mohan		Yes	Yes	Yes	Yes	Yes		Yes		
Editor Mohan	Yes	Yes			Yes	Yes				
Santhanam				Yes	Yes	Yes	Yes			
Nayanthara								Yes	Yes	Yes
Manobala		Yes	Yes		Yes	Yes				
Prakash Raj			Yes		Yes				Yes	
Livingston			Yes	Yes		Yes				
Sayaji Shinde					Yes		Yes			Yes
O. A. K. Sundar			Yes	Yes			Yes			
Kadhal Dhandapani				Yes		Yes	Yes			

== Personal life ==
Raja is married and has a son, Pranav Mohan, who made his acting debut as a child artist in Tamilarasan (2023). He also has a daughter.

== Filmography ==
Key
†	Denotes films that have not yet been released

- All films are in Tamil, unless otherwise noted.
- Note: He was credited as M. Raja till 2011.

=== As a Director ===
Year	Title	Notes
2001	Hanuman Junction	Telugu film; Remake of Malayalam film Thenkasipattanam
2003	Jayam	Also producer Remake of Telugu film with the same name
2004	M. Kumaran Son of Mahalakshmi	Also producer Remake of Amma Nanna O Tamila Ammayi; Nominated—Filmfare Award for Best Director – Tamil
2006	Unakkum Enakkum	Also producer Remake of Nuvvostanante Nenoddantana
2008	Santosh Subramaniam	Remake of Bommarillu; Tamil Nadu State Film Award for Best Film (Third prize); Nominated—Filmfare Award for Best Director – Tamil
2010	Thillalangadi	Also producer Remake of Kick
2011	Velayudham	Loosely based on the 2000 Telugu film Azad
2015	Thani Oruvan	Won—Edison Award for Best Director; Won—IIFA Utsavam Award for Best Director; Won—Filmfare Award for Best Director - Tamil
2017	Velaikkaran	
2022	Godfather	Telugu film; Remake of Lucifer

=== As Actor ===
Year	Title	Role	Ref.
2014	Enna Satham Indha Neram	Raja	
2023	Yaadhum Oore Yaavarum Kelir	Vincent	

=== As co-producer ===
- Manasichi Choodu (1998)
