= Ravi Kant =

Ravi Kant may refer to:

- Ravi Kant (Indian executive) (born 1944), former MD of Tata Motors
- Ravi Kant (lawyer), Indian Supreme Court advocate
- Ravi Kant (surgeon) (born 1956), professor of surgery and Padma Shri award winner
- Ravi Kant (Associate Professor) (born 1981), an Indian origin associate professor of medical microbiology, based in Finland and affiliated to University of Helsinki, Finland and Medical University of Gdansk, Poland

== See also ==
- Ravikant, a given name
