= Ravi Sood =

Canadian businessman

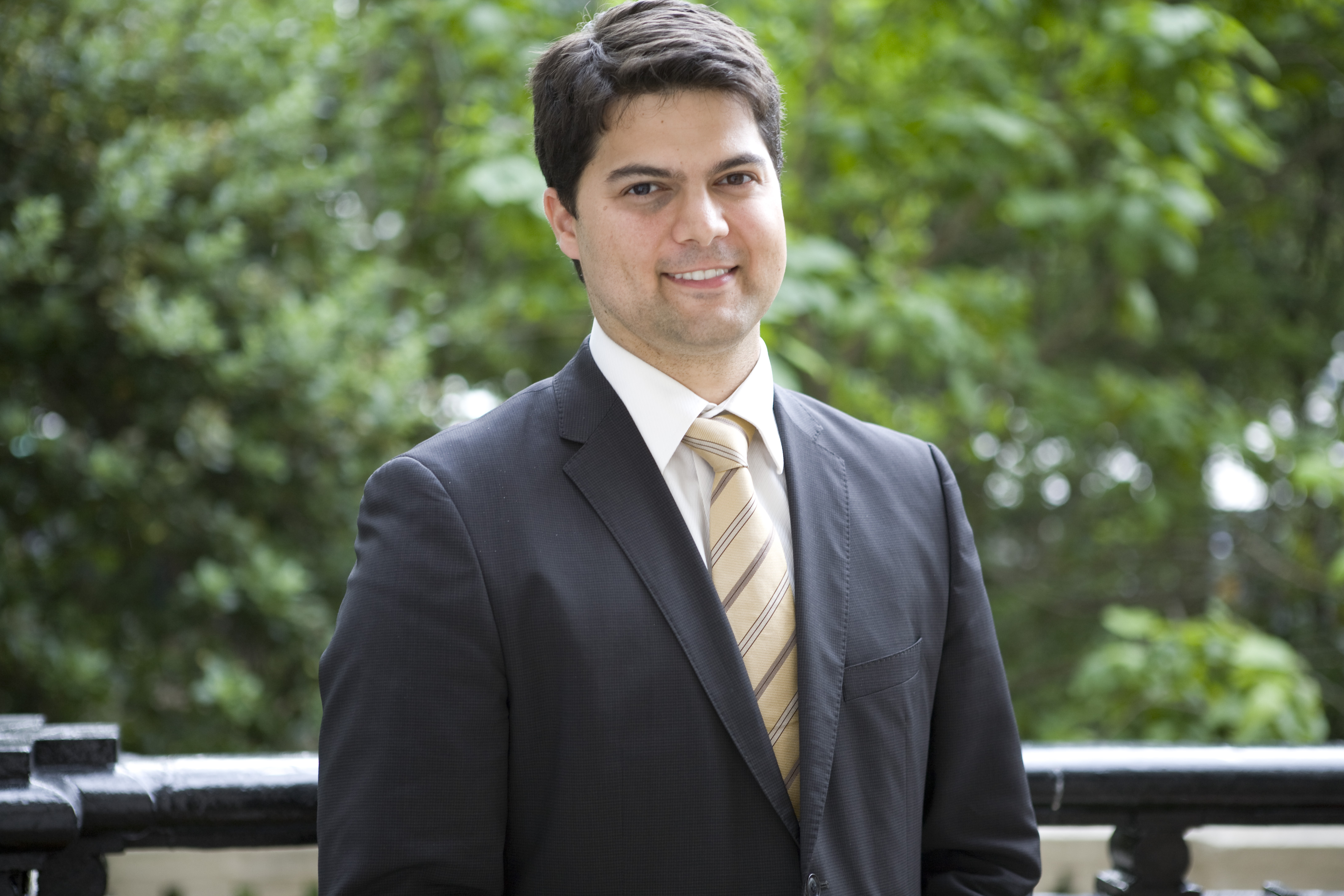
- Education: B.Math (Honours)
- Alma mater: University of Waterloo
- Known for: Agriculture, mining, Africa, natural resources

Ravi Sood (born July 5, 1976) is a Canadian financier and venture capitalist. He was raised in Waterloo, Ontario, and resides in Hong Kong. He received a bachelor's degree in mathematics from the University of Waterloo. He is the co-founder and former CEO of Navina Asset Management and its predecessor company Lawrence Asset Management, which at its peak controlled over $800 million in assets globally.

Sood has also founded several businesses operating in emerging markets, including Buchanan Renewables Inc., Feronia Inc., Jade Power Trust, Abraxas Power Corp., and Golconda Gold.

Sood became well known in Canada as a regular TV personality and frequent guest host of the Business News Network's evening news programme Squeeze Play. He is best known for commenting in the media on the income trust sector, global markets, natural resources and agriculture.
