= Jayam (2003 film) =

- Directed by: M. Raja
- Written by: Prasanna Kumar (dialogues)
- Story by: Teja
- Based on: Jayam (Telugu)
- Produced by: M. Varalakshmi; Editor Mohan
- Starring: Ravi Mohan; Sadha; Gopichand
- Cinematography: R. Rathnavelu
- Edited by: Editor Mohan
- Music by: R. P. Patnaik
- Production company: M. L. Movie Aarts
- Release date: 21 June 2003
- Running time: 162 minutes
- Country: India
- Language: Tamil

Jayam (transl. Victory) is a 2003 Indian Tamil-language romantic action film directed by M. Raja in his Tamil debut. The film is a remake of the 2002 Telugu-language film with the same title. It featured Raja's brother Ravi Mohan, Sadha, and Gopichand in their Tamil debuts, with the latter two reprising their roles from the Telugu movie alongside an ensemble supporting cast including Rajeev, Pragathi, Nizhalgal Ravi, Radha Ravi, Nalini, Senthil, and Suman Setty. The music was composed by R. P. Patnaik.

The film was released on 21 June 2003 to mixed reviews but was a sleeper hit. The success prompted Ravi to retain the film's title as a prefix to his stage name until 2025. To date, Jayam is the first and only Tamil film in which Gopichand has acted.

== Plot ==
The film begins with a flashback in the early 1980s, where a young Sujatha and Raghu are playing. Their fathers are best friends and have decided that Raghu and Sujatha will eventually get married. As the two go to high school, Sujatha becomes an ideal student, while Raghu becomes a good-for-nothing man. He develops bad habits, like stealing money and gambling. Once, he beats Sujatha's classmate for being close with her while studying, and he and Sujatha have a falling out, swearing to never meet again. Eventually, Raghu's family moves away, and as days go by, both forget about each other.

In the present, Sujatha has grown to be a beautiful young woman whom her father adores. On the outskirts of their village, Pushpathoor, lives Ravi. Ravi belongs to a poor family and was raised by his widowed mother. He is an obedient, polite man who takes tuition for kids and runs errands around the village for money. He has a group of friends, and they all go to the same college as Sujatha and become her classmates. Initially, Sujatha does not talk to Ravi, but after some time, they fall in love. This is known to Sujatha's younger sister Kalyani. As days go by, Sujatha openly reciprocates Ravi's love. The two travel in the same compartment on the train and are spotted by Sujatha's family astrologer. He conveys the same to her father, who then forbids her to go to college and contacts his old friend to arrange Sujatha’s marriage to his son, Raghu.

Raghu turns out to be an arrogant rogue and womaniser. His mother persuades him to meet Sujatha, and Raghu comes to Pushpathoor to see her with no interest. However, when he meets Sujatha, he falls for her beauty and wants to marry her. When Sujatha reveals her love for Ravi, Raghu threatens her. The wedding arrangements proceed. Ravi gets beaten up by Raghu in front of Sujatha and has his home invaded and trashed by Raghu's men, who threaten his mother. Ravi's mother, however, wants her son to fight back and says that if he dies, it should be with victory and not like a coward. Heeding his mother's words, Ravi challenges Raghu, warning him that he and Sujatha will get married before 7 A.M. the next morning. Enraged, Raghu tells the family to pull the wedding forward. Sujatha goes into the room to change, but she actually waits for Ravi after learning about his message. Ravi and Sujatha escape before Raghu arrives. After an intense chase, Ravi and Sujatha are cornered by Raghu and his men in the forest. Ravi and Raghu challenge each other in an intense hand-to-hand combat, where Ravi finally defeats Raghu. With Sujatha's father's approval, Ravi and Sujatha get married in the presence of Raghu and her family.

== Cast ==
- Ravi Mohan as Ravi
- Sadha (voice: Savitha) as Sujatha
  - Reshmi Menon as Young Sujatha
- Gopichand as Raghu
  - Dilip Kumar Salvadi as Young Raghu
- Rajeev as Sujatha's father
- Pragathi as Sujatha's mother
- Nizhalgal Ravi as Raghu's father
- Radha Ravi as Raja
- Nalini as Raghu's mother
- Kalyani as Kalyani, Sujatha's sister
- Senthil as Maadasamy
- Suman Setty as Alibaba
- Junior Balaiah as Astrologer
- Shakeela as Gnana Sarawathi
- Ramesh Khanna as Local Drunkard
- Mayilsamy
- Ilavarasu
- Manobala as Kamalesh
- Vennira Aadai Moorthy
- Pandu as College Principal
- Anamika Pravallika as Gunachithram

== Soundtrack ==
Jayam

Soundtrack album by R.P. Patnaik
- Genre: Feature film soundtrack
- Length: 30:46
- Language: Tamil
- Label: Saregama; Sun Music
- Producer: R.P. Patnaik

The songs and background score were composed by R. P. Patnaik, marking his debut in Tamil cinema. For the Tamil remake, Patnaik replaced "Raanu Raanu" with "Thiruvizhannu Vantha" (based on "Gaajuvaka Pilla" from Nuvvu Nenu), as the original was already remade as "Kai Kai Vekran" for Bagavathi. The audio rights brought by Saregama and Sun Music.

No.	Title	Lyrics	Singer(s)	Length
1.	"Kannamochi Ray Ray"	Palani Bharathi	Shankar Mahadevan	3:39
2.	"Vandi Vandi"	Na. Muthukumar	Tippu, Manikka Vinayagam	5:26
3.	"Thiruvizhannu Vandha"	Na. Muthukumar	Tippu, Gowri, Raja Hasan, Ravi Shankar Sharma	4:25
4.	"Kavithayae Theriyuma"	Arivumathi	R. P. Patnaik, Harini, Manikka Vinayagam	4:22
5.	"Kodi Kodi Minnalgal"	Palani Bharathi	Vijay Yesudas	4:48
6.	"Kaathal Kaathal"	Thamarai	Karthik	2:39
7.	"Kandha Un Aalayam"	Nandalala	Chorus	1:25
8.	"Vetri Velada"	Nandalala	R. P. Patnaik, chorus	1:40
9.	"Kaathal Thandha Vali"	Nandalala	Karthik, Ganga	1:01
Total length:				30:46

== Release and reception ==
Jayam opened to mixed reviews, with a critic from The Hindu stating the film gave a sense of "déjà vu" but added that Raja's "treatment is interesting in patches". Visual Dasan of Kalki praised the performances of Ravi, Sadha and Gopichand, flashback in the beginning of the film but panned for forcibly adding double meaning dialogues, illegal affairs and plagiarised scenes from English films and concluded calling it another film from Telugu which came to get rid of Tamil identities from Tamil films. Screen wrote "The climax is long and takes up the entire second half. The changeover of the timid Ravi into a one-man army is shown in a convincing manner. RP Patnaik’s score is hummable. Sada has given a good performance. However, Gopichand scores with a very natural performance in the role of a hot-tempered youth".

The film went on to become a surprise success at the box office and prompted Ravi to adopt "Jayam" to his stage name as a prefix for a period, while their home production studio was renamed Jayam Company. The film collected 25 crores at the box office and became commercially successful.
