= Editor Mohan =

Indian film editor, screenwriter, producer, distributor since 1960

- Born: Mohan; Madurai, Tamil Nadu, India
- Occupations: Film editor; screenwriter; producer; distributor
- Years active: 1960–present
- Spouse: Varalakshmi
- Children: 3, including Mohan Raja and Ravi Mohan

Mohan (born as Mohammed Jinnah Abdul Khader), better known as Editor Mohan is an Indian film editor turned producer, distributor, and screenwriter known for his works in Telugu and Tamil language films. He is the owner of the production companies M. M. Movie Arts, and M. L. Movie Arts.

== Personal life ==
Mohammed Jinnah Abdul Khader was born in Tirumangalam, Madurai in Tamil Nadu. At a young age, he was adopted by actor K. A. Thangavelu who renamed him as Mohan. Mohan would frequently accompany Thangavelu to film sets where he learnt the art of film editing, a profession he entered on growing up.

Mohan is married to Varalakshmi (credited in films as V. R. Lakshmi), who belongs to a Hindu family. He reportedly converted from Islam to Hinduism for marriage. They have two sons: Mohan Raja, a film director, and Ravi Mohan, an actor. They have a daughter, Roja, who is a dentist.

== Career ==
Mohan began his career as a film editor and worked on approximately 200 films across various languages. He later transitioned into production, producing 10 Telugu films and 5 Tamil films. Additionally, he dubbed 60 Telugu films into Tamil.

== Selected filmography ==
| Year | Work | Credited as | | | Language | Notes |
| Year | Work | Screenplay | Producer | Editor | Language | Notes |
|---|---|---|---|---|---|---|
| 1960 | Ellarum Innattu Mannar | | | Yes | Tamil | Uncredited |
| 1961 | Arasilankumari | | | Yes | Tamil | Uncredited |
| 1963 | Guruvunu Minchina Sishyudu | | | Yes | Telugu | |
| 1964 | Navagraha Puja Mahima | | | Yes | Telugu | |
| 1964 | Aggi Pidugu | | | Yes | Telugu | |
| 1967 | Chikkadu Dorakadu | | | Yes | Telugu | |
| 1969 | Kadaladu Vadaladu | | | Yes | Telugu | |
| 1980 | Samanthipoo | | | Yes | Tamil | |
| 1989 | Oru Thottil Sabadham | | Yes | | Tamil | |
| 1991 | Mamagaru | | Yes | | Telugu | |
| 1993 | Bava Bavamaridi | Yes | Presenter | | Telugu | Also editing supervision |
| 1995 | Subhamasthu | | Yes | | Telugu | |
| 1997 | Hitler | | Yes | | Telugu | |
| 1998 | Manasichi Choodu | | Yes | | Telugu | |
| 2000 | Kshemamga Velli Labhamga Randi | Yes | Presenter | | Telugu | Also editing supervision |
| 2001 | Hanuman Junction | | Presenter | | Telugu | Also editing supervision |
| 2002 | Panchatantram | | Presenter | | Telugu | Dubbed version |
| 2003 | Jayam | | Yes | Yes | Tamil | |
| 2008 | Santosh Subramaniam | | | Yes | Tamil | |
| 2010 | Thillalangadi | | Yes | | Tamil | |
| 2013 | Prezentacja | | | Yes | English | Polish short film |
| 2016 | Plus One +1 | | | Yes | Telugu | |
