= Amma Nanna O Tamila Ammayi =

2003 Indian Telugu-language martial arts film

- Movie poster
- Directed by: Puri Jagannadh
- Written by: Story & Screenplay: Puri Jagannadh; Dialogues: Kona Venkat
- Produced by: K. L. N. Raju
- Starring: Ravi Teja; Asin; Jayasudha; Prakash Raj
- Cinematography: Shyam K. Naidu
- Edited by: Marthand K. Venkatesh
- Music by: Chakri
- Production company: Vaishno Academy
- Release date: 19 April 2003
- Running time: 154 minutes
- Country: India
- Language: Telugu
- Box office: ₹18 crore distributors' share

Amma Nanna O Tamila Ammayi (transl. Mother, Father And a Tamil Girl) is a 2003 Indian Telugu-language sports drama film directed by Puri Jagannadh. The film stars Ravi Teja, Asin with Jayasudha, Prakash Raj, Ali, and Subbaraju play supporting roles. The film released on 19 April 2003. It marks Asin's debut in Telugu cinema.

It was first remade in Odia as Katha Deithili Maa Ku, in Tamil as M. Kumaran Son of Mahalakshmi, in Kannada as Maurya, and in Bhojpuri as Jigarwala. In the Tamil version, Asin, Prakash Raj and Aishwarya reprised their roles. It was declared a blockbuster at the box-office and was one of the highest-grossing Telugu films of the year, collecting a distributor's share of ₹18 crore by the end of its theatrical run. It was also Ravi Teja's most successful film up until that point before the release of Vikramarkudu in 2006.

== Plot ==
Chandrasekhar Rao "Chandu"'s entire life is about his mother Lakshmi, a college lecturer. They together live in Hyderabad. When Chandu was a little boy, Lakshmi separated from her husband Raghuveer. Chandu is a great kickboxer and is very passionate about it. He later meets Mugambigambal aka Chennai, a Tamil girl from Chennai, and starts to fall in love with her. Chandu's happy life is suddenly jolted when his mother dies of a heart attack. On her deathbed, she tells him to go to Visakhapatnam to meet Raghuveer, who is a kickboxing champion that won the championship six times in a row who turns out to be Chandu’s father. It is revealed that Lakshmi and Raghuveer got separated when Chandu was at a young age as Raghuveer wanted to concentrate on kick boxing. Chandu goes to Visakhapatnam to meet him.

When Chandu reaches Visakhapatnam, he meets his father but sees that he has another wife, Shalini, and a daughter named Swapna. He sees that he is happily settled with them and gets angry. He also gets a job as a janitor and juice provider at his father's kickboxing academy. Anand is Raghuveer's best student, and he is sure that Anand will win the championship. Unexpectedly, he sees that Mugaambigaambaal's family lives here and talks to her. Later, Chandu finds out that Anand makes Swapna pregnant and then abandons her. Anand also abandons Raghuveer by getting another master and other sponsors. Raghuveer is attacked by several of Anand's sponsors, and Chandu later beats them up, making Raghuveer find out that Chandu is a great kickboxer. Raghuveer also finds out that Chandu was also participating in the kickboxing championship. The rest of the story is how Raghuveer trains Chandu and wins the championship, how Chandu wins the heart of Mugaambigaambaal, and how he unites Swapna and Anand. After the fight, Chandu reveals he is half Tamilian and quarter Gujarati and Anglo Indian, much to Mugaambigaambaal's surprise when Chandu spoke Tamil, saying, "Shall we get married now?"

== Cast ==
- Ravi Teja as Chandrasekhar "Chandu" Rao
- Asin as Mugambigambal / Chennai
- Jayasudha as Lakshmi, Chandu's mother
- Prakash Raj as Raghuveer, Chandu's father
- Ali as Appala Raju, Chandu's friend
- Subbaraju as Anand
- Aishwarya as Shalini, Raghuveer's second wife
- Dharmavarapu Subramanyam as Thyagaraj Bhagavatahar, Mugaambigaambaal's father
- Uma as Mugaambigaambal's sister
- Harika as Mugaambigaambaal's friend
- Ramaraju as Chandu's boxing coach in Hyderabad
- M. S. Narayana as Broker
- Prudhvi Raj as Police Officer
- Kaadambari Kiran as Balaraju
- Jogi Naidu as Thyagaraj's son and Mugaambigaambaal's brother
- Bandla Ganesh as a man at the mall
- Junior Relangi as Ayyaswamy
- Alphonsa as Appala Raju's love interest (special appearance)

== Production ==
The film was initially titled Amma Nanna Oka Tamila Ammayi.

== Soundtrack ==
Amma Nanna O Tamila Ammayi

Soundtrack album to Amma Nanna O Tamila Ammayi by Chakri
- Released: 7 April 2003
- Recorded: 2003
- Genre: Feature film soundtrack
- Length: 29:50
- Language: Telugu
- Label: Aditya Music
- Producer: Chakri

Chakri chronology
Idiot (2002)	Amma Nanna O Tamila Ammayi (2003)	Sivamani (2003)

The songs and background score was done by Chakri. The audio launch was held at Viceroy Convention Hall, Viceroy Hotel on 7 April 2003. To suit the title, Poori Jagannath has invited 'Amma Nanna' (Mr. Venkat Rao & Mrs. Anjana) of Chiranjeevi to release the audio cassette. The tune of the song "Chennai Chandrama" was based on "Mahaganapathim", a kriti by the 18th-century carnatic composer Muthuswami Dikshitar in Nattai ragam. This song was used by Srikanth Deva as "Chennai Senthamizh" in the Tamil remake version M. Kumaran Son of Mahalakshmi. The song "Lunchkostava" is laced with Tamil lyrics for the female singer.

Track listing
No.	Title	Lyrics	Singer(s)	Length
1.	"Chennai Chandrama"	Kandikonda	Chakri, Kousalya	4:15
2.	"Lunchkostava"	Sahithi	Chakri, Kousalya	4:55
3.	"Neeve Neeve"	Peddada Murthy	Chakri	5:28
4.	"Zum Zummare"	Chandrabose	Kousalya	5:58
5.	"Chumma Chumma"	Bhaskarabhatla	Ravi Verma, Kousalya	4:33
6.	"Taluku Taluku"	Bhaskarabhatla	Raghu Kunche, Smita	4:41
Total length:				29:50

== Reception ==
A critic from Sify wrote that "It is Jayasudha as the mother and Prakash Raj as the irresponsible father who hog the show along with Ravi Teja". Jeevi of Idlebrain.com rated the film three out of five and wrote that "the sentiment scenes in this film are heart touching".

== Awards ==
Filmfare Awards South

- Filmfare Award for Best Actress – Telugu – Asin
- Filmfare Award for Best Supporting Actress – Telugu – Jayasudha
- Filmfare Award for Best Comedian – Telugu – Ali

Nandi Awards

- Third Best Feature Film - Bronze — Puri Jagannadh
- Best Character Actor – Prakash Raj
- Best Dialogue Writer - Puri Jagannadh
