= Asin filmography =

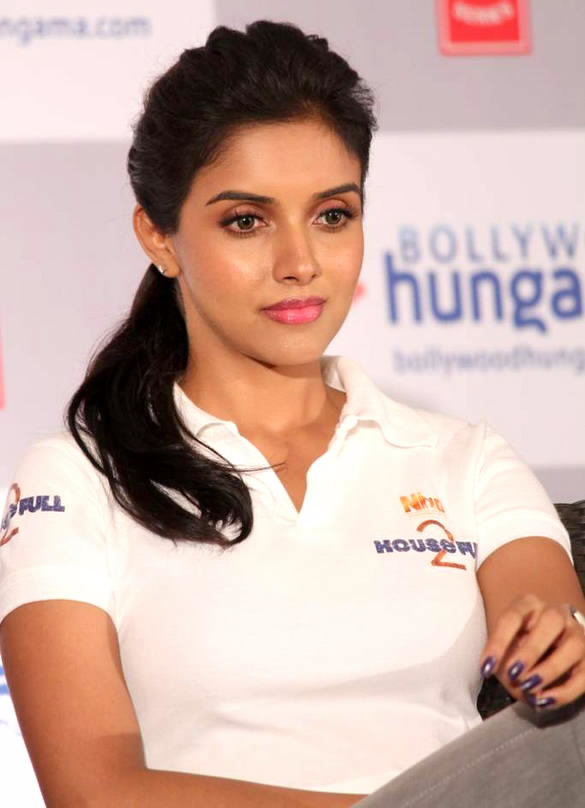
Asin at a promotional event for Housefull 2 in 2012

Asin is a former Indian actress who is known for her work in Tamil, Telugu and Hindi language films. She made her acting debut at the age of 15 in the Malayalam-language satirical comedy-drama Narendran Makan Jayakanthan Vaka in 2001. Asin had her first commercial success with the Telugu film Amma Nanna O Tamila Ammayi (2003). For her performance as a Tamil girl in the film, she received the Filmfare Best Telugu Actress Award. In the same year she won the Santosham Best Actress Award for her role in Telugu film Sivamani. In her next two Telugu releases: Lakshmi Narasimha (2004) and Gharshana (2004), Asin played the love interest of a police officer. Lakshmi Narasimha was a commercial success, while Gharshana received mixed reviews from critics but later gained a cult following.

She made her debut in Tamil cinema in the 2004 sports drama M. Kumaran Son of Mahalakshmi, a commercial success. (Note: A remake of Amma Nanna O Tamila Ammayi) The 2005 action thriller Ghajini marked a turning point in her career. Her role as a vivacious young model named Kalpana won her the Filmfare Best Tamil Actress Award. This led to a series of lead roles in commercially successful films, including the action film Sivakasi (2005), the thriller Varalaru (2006), the action thriller Pokkiri (2007), the action drama Vel (2008) and the science fiction film Dasavathaaram (2008), which established her as a leading actress of Tamil cinema.

Her Bollywood debut was opposite Aamir Khan in Ghajini, (Note: A remake of the 2005 Tamil-language film of the same name) the first Bollywood film to gross more than ₹1 billion at the domestic box office. Asin won the Filmfare Best Female Debut Award and many accolades for her role in the film. She later played a lead role in the musical drama London Dreams (2009), which performed poorly at the box office. Asin co-starred with Salman Khan in the romantic comedy Ready (2011), which was a box office success, grossing ₹1.84 billion (US$20 million) worldwide. In 2012, Asin starred in the action comedies Housefull 2, Bol Bachchan and Khiladi 786, all of which were commercially successful, with the former two entering the 100 Crore Club. Her only release of 2015 was the romantic comedy All Is Well.

Asin garnered the Kalaimamani in 2009, a Tamil Nadu government award for excellence in the field of art and literature. Four years later, she was conferred with the Pride of South Indian Cinema award at SIIMA for her contribution to Tamil cinema. Asin was referred to as the "Queen of Kollywood" by the media during her acting career. After her marriage in 2016, she retired from acting.

== Films ==
Asin's film credits
Year	Film	Role(s)	Language	Ref.
2001	Narendran Makan Jayakanthan Vaka	Swathi	Malayalam	
2003	Amma Nanna O Tamila Ammayi	Mugaambigaambaal (Chennai)	Telugu	
2003	Sivamani	Vasantha	Telugu	
2004	Lakshmi Narasimha	Rukhmini	Telugu	
2004	Gharshana	Maya	Telugu	
2004	M. Kumaran Son of Mahalakshmi	Mythili (Malabar)	Tamil	
2005	Chakram	Lakshmi	Telugu	
2005	Ullam Ketkumae	Priya	Tamil	
2005	Ghajini	Kalpana	Tamil	
2005	Majaa	Seeta	Tamil	
2005	Sivakasi	Hema	Tamil	
2006	Varalaru	Divya	Tamil	
2006	Annavaram	Aishwarya	Telugu	
2007	Aalwar	Priya	Tamil	
2007	Pokkiri	Shruthi	Tamil	
2007	Vel	Swati	Tamil	
2008	Dasavathaaram	Kodhai / Andal (Note: Asin played two characters.)	Tamil	
2008	Ghajini	Kalpana Shetty	Hindi	
2009	London Dreams	Priya Kaul	Hindi	
2011	Kaavalan	Meera Muthuramalingam	Tamil	
2011	Ready	Sanjana Singh / Pooja Malhotra (Note: Asin played a single character with two or more names.)	Hindi	
2012	Housefull 2	Heena Kapoor	Hindi	
2012	Bol Bachchan	Sania Ali / Apeksha Malhotra	Hindi	
2012	Khiladi 786	Indu Tendulkar	Hindi	
2015	All Is Well	Nimmi Singh	Hindi	

== See also ==
- List of awards and nominations received by Asin
