= List of awards and nominations received by Asin =

Asin awards and nominations
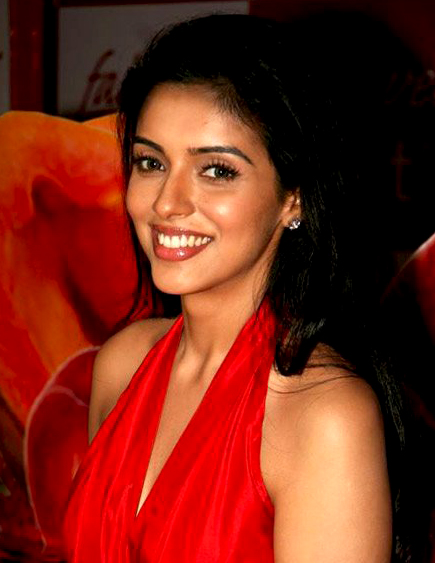
- Asin in 2011
Awards and nominations
Award	Wins	Nominations

Totals (Note: Certain award groups do not simply award one winner. They acknowledge several different recipients, have runners-up, and have third place. Since this is a specific recognition and is different from losing an award, runner-up mentions are considered wins in this award tally. For simplification and to avoid errors, each award in this list has been presumed to have had a prior nomination.)
- Wins: 21
- Nominations: 34

This is a list of awards and nominations of Asin, an Indian actress who has worked in Tamil, Telugu, Malayalam and Hindi movies. Asin has won a number of awards for her performance in various films in the Tamil, Telugu and Hindi industries, including the most coveted Kalaimamani award by the Chief Minister of Tamil Nadu in 2009. She has won various Filmfare awards and other prominent awards for her acting skills in all three major industries which she has been part of in her career. The three Filmfare awards, she has won so far includes, Filmfare Best Telugu Actress Award for Amma Nanna O Tamila Ammayi, Filmfare Best Tamil Actress Award for Ghajini and Filmfare Best Female Debut Award for her Hindi debut in Ghajini.

Asin was also awarded for her achievements and success in the field of entertainment by the government of Kerala in March 2012. The annual award is presented to women who are true icons for young women in Kerala. She quoted,

"I'm honoured and humbled. It was amazing to receive the award on home soil. Though I have attended several award ceremonies and won several honours all these years, this was singularly unique for me. It was special even for my family. Being recognised by people in the place where you come from has special significance."

Apart from her Filmfare awards, she has also won Santosham Best Actress Award for her performance in Shivamani and ITFA Best Actress Award for her portrayal of a Brahmin girl in Dasavathaaram. In 2012, she won the Pride of Kerala award at the Asianet Film Awards. Most recently she was honoured with the Pride of South Indian Cinema award at SIIMA 2013.

== Filmfare Awards ==
The Filmfare Awards are presented annually by The Times Group to honour both artistic and technical excellence of professionals in the Hindi language film industry of India.

Year	Category	Film	Result
2009	Best Female Debut	Ghajini	Won
2009	Best Actress	Ghajini	Nominated

== Filmfare Awards South ==
The Filmfare Awards South is a segment of Filmfare Awards, which is given to the South Indian film industry, that consists of the Tamil, Telugu, Malayalam and Kannada film industries.

Year	Category	Film	Result
2003	Best Actress – Telugu	Amma Nanna O Tamila Ammayi	Won
2003	Best Actress – Telugu	Sivamani	Nominated
2004	Best Actress – Tamil	M. Kumaran S/O Mahalakshmi	Nominated
2005	Best Actress – Tamil	Majaa	Nominated
2005	Best Actress – Tamil	Ghajini	Won
2007	Best Actress – Tamil	Pokkiri	Nominated
2008	Best Actress – Tamil	Dasavathaaram	Nominated
2011	Best Actress – Tamil	Kavalan	Nominated

== International Indian Film Academy Awards ==
The International Indian Film Academy Awards (IIFA) are presented annually by the International Indian Film Academy to honour both artistic and technical excellence of professionals in Bollywood, the Hindi language film industry.

Year	Category	Film	Result
2009	Star Debut of the Year – Female	Ghajini	Won
2009	Best Actress	Ghajini	Nominated

== International Tamil Film Awards ==
The International Tamil Film Awards are presented annually by the International Indian Film Academy to honour both artistic and technical excellence of professionals in Kollywood, the Tamil language film industry.

Year	Category	Film	Result
2008	Best Actress	Dasavathaaram	Won

== Indian Television Academy Awards ==
The Indian Television Academy Awards is an annual event organised by the Indian Television Academy.

Year	Category	Result
2009	GR8! Women Achiever Award in Cinema	Won
2013	GR8! Women Achiever Award in Cinema	Won

== Santosham Film Awards ==
The Santosham Film Awards are presented by Santosham film magazine to honour excellence in Telugu films.

Year	Category	Film	Result
2003	Best Actress	Shivamani	Won

== Screen Awards ==
The Screen Awards is the only awards ceremony in India to be involved with the Executive Director and the Governor of the Academy of Motion Picture Arts and Sciences. They are presented annually to honour professional excellence in the Hindi language film industry of India.

Year	Category	Film	Result
2009	Most Promising Newcomer – Female	Ghajini	Won
2009	Best Actress	Ghajini	Nominated
2012	Best Actress (Popular Choice)	Ready	Nominated
2013	Best Actress (Popular Choice)	Housefull 2	Nominated

== South Indian International Movie Awards ==
The South Indian International Movie Awards or commonly referred as SIIMA are given to honour excellence in the South Indian film industry. The awards are given for Tamil, Telugu, Malayalam and Kannada films.

Year	Category	Film	Result
2012	Best Actress	Kaavalan	Won
2013	Pride of South Indian Cinema		Won
2014	Youth Icon of South Indian Cinema		Won
2015	Most Popular Actress Middle East		Won

== Stardust Awards ==
The Stardust Awards is presented by Stardust magazine. They are presented annually to honour professional excellence in the Hindi language film industry of India.

Year	Category	Film	Result
2009	Superstar of Tomorrow – Female	Ghajini	Won
2010	Superstar of Tomorrow – Female	London Dreams	Nominated
2012	Best Comedy – Romance Actress	Ready	Nominated
2013	Best Comedy – Romance Actress	Housefull 2 & Bol Bachchan	Nominated

== Vijay Awards ==
The Vijay Awards are presented by the Tamil television channel STAR Vijay to honour excellence in Tamil cinema. It has given annually since 2007.

Year	Category	Film	Result
2007	Favourite Heroine	Pokkiri	Nominated
2007	Best Actress	Pokkiri	Nominated
2008	Best Actress	Dasavathaaram	Nominated
2008	Favourite Heroine	Dasavathaaram	Nominated
2011	Favourite Heroine	Kaavalan	Nominated

== Times of India Most Desirable Women ==
It is an annual poll conducted by Times Now to select the most desirable Men and Women in India.

Year	Title	Rank	Result
2011	Most Desirable Women	#11	Won
2012	Most Desirable Women	#17	Won
2013	Most Desirable Women	#16	Won

== Other awards and recognition ==
- 2008: Anandalok Puraskar Awards, Best Actress (Hindi), Ghajini
- 2009: Kalaimamani Award
- 2012: Annual Award by Kerala Government
