= Rakshith =

Rakshith is a given name and surname. Notable people with the name include:

- Rakksh Raam (fl. 2012), Indian actor
- Prem Rakshith (born 1977), Indian choreographer

== See also ==
- Rakshit (disambiguation)
- Rakshita
- Rakshit (surname)
