= Rakshit =

Rakshit is a given name. Notable people with the name include:

- Rakshit Atluri (fl. 2017), Indian actor
- Rakshit Shetty (born 1983), Indian actor and filmmaker

== See also ==
- Rakshith (disambiguation)
- Rakshita (name)
- Rakshit (surname)
