= Kaavalan =

2011 Indian film directed by Siddique

- Theatrical poster
- Directed by: Siddique
- Written by: Siddique
- Based on: Body Guard (Malayalam)
- Produced by: C. Romesh Babu
- Starring: Vijay; Asin; Mithra Kurian
- Cinematography: N. K. Ekambaram
- Edited by: K. R. Gowrishankar
- Music by: Vidyasagar
- Production company: Ekaveera Creations
- Distributed by: Cinema Paradise
- Release date: 14 January 2011
- Running time: 153 minutes
- Country: India
- Language: Tamil
- Box office: est. ₹45–102 crore

Kaavalan (transl. Bodyguard) is a 2011 Indian Tamil-language romantic action comedy film written and directed by Siddique. A remake of Siddique's Malayalam film Body Guard, the film stars Vijay, Asin and Mithra Kurian (who reprises her role from the original), while Rajkiran, Roja Selvamani and Vadivelu appear in supporting roles. The music was composed by Vidyasagar, while cinematography and editing were handled by N. K. Ekambaram and K. R. Gowrishankar, respectively. In the film, Meera develops feelings for her bodyguard Bhoominathan and begins calling him as an anonymous caller Ammukutty.

The film's principal shoot commenced in April 2010 and it was completed by November. Originally, it was scheduled to release on 17 December 2010, but the release was postponed to 14 January 2011. The film was selected to be screened at the Shanghai International Film Festival and received positive reviews from critics with praise for its cast performances (Vijay, Asin and Vadivelu), humour and action sequences. The film became a commercial success by grossing around ₹45–102 crore worldwide.

== Plot ==
Bhoominathan idolises Muthuramalingam, a rich powerful landlord in Semmanur. At the request of his parents, Bhoomi accepts to work for Muthuramalingam as his bodyguard. Muthuramalingam's rival is baying for his blood as his daughter committed suicide after Muthuramalingam's son rejected her proposal. While Bhoomi protects Muthuramalingam, his rival threatens the life of his daughter Meera. No one accepts Bhoomi as he had attacked Meera's brother, thus getting him fired from the job, but Bhoomi saves Muthuramalingam from an attack and finally regains his job. Bhoomi is sent to college along with Meera and her friend Madhu to protect them from the threat.

Bhoomi joins the same class where Meera studies, as he has previously discontinued his education. Meera does not like Bhoomi following her as a bodyguard, and plans to divert him. Meera calls Bhoomi over his mobile phone from a private number and introduces herself as Ammukutty. Initially, Bhoomi hates the mobile call as it will disturb him, but later develops a liking towards Ammukutty and slowly love blossoms for Bhoomi without knowing that it is Meera herself. He saves Meera from an attack from Muthuramalingam's rival. At one point, Meera too feels herself develop liking towards Bhoomi and expresses her desire to meet him in person without revealing her identity. Due to circumstances, they are not able to accomplish this, and she decides to elope with Bhoomi for which he agrees.

However, Muthuramalingam learns that Bhoomi and Meera are going to run away and sends his men to stop him. Bhoomi thrashes them up easily but Muthuramalingam thrashes Bhoomi. Meera overhears her father's plans and decides to save Bhoomi by lying that he is in love with some other girl and has planned to elope with her. Muthuramalingam spares Bhoomi, believing that Meera is not his lover, but sends his men to the railway station to find out Bhoomi's lover. He also instructs that Bhoomi should be killed if there is no one in the railway station. In a desperate attempt to save Bhoomi, Meera comes up with a plan and requests Madhu to go to the railway station and pretend to be Ammukutty, so that Muthuramalingam's men will spare Bhoomi believing Madhu to be his lover.

Meera also gives a mobile phone to Madhu and informs to give it to Bhoomi when she meets him (as Bhoomi's phone is broken) so that she can reveal the truth to Bhoomi. Madhu agrees and leaves to the station. At the station, Bhoomi gets surprised seeing Madhu in the station and believes that it is Madhu, who was pretending as Ammukutty so far and hugs her. Muthuramalingam's men see this and leave the place, believing that Meera is not Bhoomi's lover. Suddenly, Madhu gets a call in the mobile given by Meera. Madhu understands that the call is from Meera and she wants to speak to Bhoomi. However, Madhu throws away the phone from train, following which it is revealed that Madhu also likes Bhoomi, and she decides to marry him by betraying Meera.

10 years later, Bhoomi is now a high-ranking I.F.S. officer, who returns to Muthuramalingam's village for a short vacation before leaving to Australia, along with his son Sidharth. Muthuramalingam's condition is ill and Madhu had died a few years back due to some medical ailments, but she has written all the truth in a diary and gives it to Sidharth to read it after her death. Sidharth has learnt all the truth. Madhu has also mentioned in the diary that this truth should never be disclosed to Bhoomi. Meera stays with her father, and Bhoomi gets shocked to know that Meera still remains unmarried.

When Bhoomi and Sidharth are about to return home, Sidharth asks Meera to come with them and expresses his wish to call her as his mother. Bhoomi berates Sidharth for his suggestion and apologises to Meera and Muthuramalingam, but Muthuramalingam also insists Meera to leave with Bhoomi. Bhoomi, Meera and Sidharth leave together from the village. Just before the train starts, Sidharth throws the diary containing the truth in a dust bin and comes back, but Bhoomi takes back the diary from the dust bin, without Sidharth's knowledge. Upon reading the diary, Bhoomi is shocked knowing it was Meera who loved him in the name of Ammukutty and wholeheartedly accepts Meera.

== Cast ==
- Vijay as Bhoominathan (Bhoomi)
- Asin as Meera (Ammukutty), Muthuramalingam's daughter
- Mithra Kurian as Madhavi (Madhu), Meera's best friend and Bhoominathan's wife
- Rajkiran as Semmanur Muthuramalingam, Meera's father
- Roja as Devika, Meera's mother
- Vadivelu as Ammavasai
- Livingston as college Principal
- Madhan Bob as college lecturer
- Mahadevan as Devarajan
- Krishna Kumar as Karthik
- M. S. Bhaskar as Sakkran, Madhu's father
- Nizhalgal Ravi as Parthasarathy, Bhoomi's father
- Yuvasri as Bhoomi's mother
- Delhi Ganesh as Bhoomi's maternal uncle
- Neepa as Poongodi
- Guinness Pakru as Meera's friend and classmate
- Sharmilee as Hostel Warden
- Vaiyapuri as Bhoomi's friend at Bangkok (cameo appearance)
- Sathish Krishnan as college dance master (guest appearance)

== Production ==
=== Development ===
The film was initially referred to as Kaavalkaaran, which literally means "bodyguard" in Tamil. After rumours of the title being changed to Kaaval Kaadhal, the film was officially confirmed to be titled Kaavalan in August 2010. The reason for the name confusion and its eventual permanent change was due to complications in obtaining the rights to the title of Kaavalkaaran from M. G. Ramachandran's producers. They refused to sell the title to Vijay, leading to the rechristening of the title to Kaavalan.

=== Casting ===
With the announcement of the remake, Siddique had finalised Vijay to play the lead role, reminiscent of their previous venture Friends (2001), which was also a remake of Siddique's own Malayalam film. Asin was signed up to pair with Vijay for the third time after their previous pairings in Sivakasi (2005) and Pokkiri (2007), also giving Asin a comeback in Tamil cinema after her last appearance in Dasavathaaram (2008). This also marks Vijay's comeback to romance genre after Sachein (2005).

=== Filming ===
The film's principal shoot began in April at Kumbakonam. An incident occurred on set in April, where Asin, her father, and her makeup assistants fainted in their caravan after being exposed to a gas leak. They were treated in hospital the same day and were eventually discharged. The second shoot schedule occurred in Vellore. Vijay and Asin, along with director Siddique and the rest of crew filmed at the Vellore Institute of Technology. A song was shot at Kuala Lumpur, Malaysia.

== Soundtrack ==
Kaavalan

Soundtrack album by Vidyasagar
- Released: 8 December 2010
- Recorded: 2010
- Genre: Feature film soundtrack
- Length: 20:56
- Language: Tamil
- Label: Venus
- Producer: Vidyasagar

Vidyasagar chronology
Mandhira Punnagai (2010)	Kaavalan (2010)	Ilaignan (2010)

The score and soundtrack were then composed by Vidyasagar, collaborating with Vijay for the 8th time, after Coimbatore Mappillai, Nilaave Vaa, Thirumalai, Ghilli, Madhurey, Aathi and Kuruvi. The audio launch was held on 8 December 2010.

Track listing
No.	Title	Lyrics	Singer(s)	Length
1.	"Vinnai Kaapan"	Pa. Vijay	Tippu, Shweta Mohan	4:30
2.	"Step Step"	Viveka	Benny Dayal, Megha	4:27
3.	"Yaradu"	Yugabharathi	Karthik, Suchitra	4:36
4.	"Sada Sada"	Yugabharathi	Karthik	4:15
5.	"Pattamboochi"	Kabilan	KK, Rita	3:48

MusicAloud.com rated the album 8 out of 10, stating "After a completely subdued soundtrack for Mandhira Punnagai, he creates another out-and-out commercial score in Kaavalan. A sureshot musical hit for Vijay!" Rediff rated the album 2.5 out of 5, stating that "Kaavalan would be a throwback to the star's earlier, romance-heavy movies, notably Friends. It looks like Vidhyasagar has followed the same mission directive. It's a relief to see less of hero-overtones and more soft numbers."

== Marketing ==
The trailer was released worldwide on 16 December 2010 in Northern California, marking the first time a Vijay film trailer was launched outside India.

== Controversies ==
Due to the failure of Sura (2010), theatre owners faced huge losses, and asked Vijay to compensate 35% of the loss amount. However, Vijay did not give any response. A week before the film's release, Tamil Nadu Theatre Owners Association, had announced that they will not give any other co-operation to Kaavalan, and the actor's other future projects. As a result, two shows were cancelled on the opening day, 14 January 2011, and went ahead with matinee shows.

Moreover, it was rumoured that significant industry stakeholders from Dravida Munnetra Kazhagam pressurised exhibitors to stall the film's release, since Aadukalam, which was distributed by Sun Pictures, was slated to release in January 2011, and also majority of the theatres were controlled by the party supremos. In order to have a smooth release, Vijay sought help from J. Jayalalithaa, from All India Anna Dravida Munnetra Kazhagam, which was the opposition party at that time, as a result the film opened to 450 screens, on 15 January 2011.

== Release ==
Originally slated to release on 17 December 2010, Kaavalan was released on 15 January 2011. The film was selected at the 14th Shanghai International Film Festival in the panorama section. SIFF issued an invitation to Vijay as guest of honour.

Kaavalan re-released in Kerala after ten years on 10 February 2022 to celebrate 10th year of its release.

== Reception ==
=== Box office ===
Kaavalan released over 600 screens. Kaavalan released to generally positive reviews from critics. The film collected ₹55 lakhs in Chennai during its opening weekend. By the end of six weeks it had grossed around ₹45–102 crore at the worldwide box office. The film grossed US$75,000 in the United Kingdom The movie managed to complete a 100-day run in 2 theatres in Tamil Nadu

=== Critical response ===
Pavithra Srinivasan of Rediff.com praised Vadivelu and Vijay's comedic performances, but criticised the Tamil version of the film, for being edited in such a way that scenes either lacked resolution or coherence, and some character dialogue was delivered "without continuity". Ananda Vikatan rated the film 42 out of 100. A critic from Rediff.com, while giving the film 3.5 out of 5 stars, credited Vijay for "shedding his action/political persona" and "choosing a script that focuses on comedy and emotions".

The Times of India rated the film 3/5 and says "'Kaavalan' is vintage Vijay on display and is proof that if he keeps away from superhero mannerisms and sticks to the vision of the director". Sify.com described the film as "super fun" and a "perfect Pongal family entertainer" and rated it 4.5/5. The reviewer particularly praised Vijay's performance, observing that the film works "purely on his star charisma and larger-than-life image" and that "he carries the film on his shoulders and is one good reason to watch the film".

== Accolades ==
Award	Category	Recipient	Result
Vijay Awards	Favourite Hero	Vijay	Nominated
Vijay Awards	Entertainer of the Year	Vijay	Nominated
Vijay Awards	Favourite Heroine	Asin	Nominated
Vijay Awards	Favourite Film	Kaavalan	Nominated
Vijay Awards	Favourite Song	Pattamboochi	Won
Vijay Awards	Best Music Director	Vidyasagar	Nominated
Vijay Awards	Best Comedian	Vadivelu	Nominated
Vijay Awards	Best Male Playback Singer	Karthik	Nominated
Vijay Awards	Best Lyricist	Kabilan	Won
SIIMA	Best Actress	Asin	Won
Filmfare Awards South	Best Actress	Asin	Nominated
