= Vijay Award for Favourite Heroine =

Award category

The Vijay Award for Favorite Heroine is given by STAR Vijay as part of its annual Vijay Awards ceremony to recognise excellence in Tamil (Kollywood) cinema.

== Winners ==
Year	Actor	Film	Ref.
2017	Nayanthara	Aramm	
2014	Hansika Motwani	Maan Karate	
2013	Nayanthara	Raja Rani	
2012	Kajal Aggarwal	Thuppaki	
2011	Anushka Shetty	Deiva Thirumagal	
2010	Trisha	Vinnaithaandi Varuvaayaa	
2009	Anushka Shetty	Vettaikaaran	
2008	Nayanthara	Yaaradi Nee Mohini	
2007	Nayanthara	Billa	
2006	Trisha	Unnakum Ennakum	

== Multiple wins ==
The following individuals have received two or more Best Actress awards:

Wins	Actress
4	Nayanthara
2	Anushka Shetty, Trisha Krishnan

== Winners and nominations ==
- 2007 Nayanthara - Billa
  - Asin - Pokkiri
  - Shriya Saran - Sivaji: The Boss
  - Jyothika - Mozhi
  - Trisha - Kireedam
- 2008 Nayanthara - Yaaradi Nee Mohini
  - Asin - Dasavathaaram
  - Genelia D'Souza - Santosh Subramaniam
  - Sneha - Pirivom Santhippom
  - Trisha - Abhiyum Naanum
- 2009 Anushka Shetty - Vettaikaaran
  - Nayanthara - Aadhavan
  - Shriya Saran - Kanthaswamy
  - Tamannaah Bhatia - Ayan
  - Trisha - Sarvam
- 2010 Trisha - Vinnaithaandi Varuvaayaa
  - Aishwarya Rai - Enthiran
  - Anushka Shetty - Singam
  - Nayanthara - Boss Engira Bhaskaran
  - Tamannaah Bhatia - Paiyaa
- 2011 Anushka Shetty - Deiva Thirumagal
  - Asin - Kaavalan
  - Hansika Motwani - Engeyum Kadhal
  - Taapsee Pannu - Aadukalam
  - Trisha - Mankatha
- 2012 Kajal Aggarwal - Thuppakki
  - Shruti Haasan - 3
  - Anushka Shetty - Thaandavam
  - Pooja Hegde - Mugamoodi
  - Ileana D'Cruz - Nanban
  - Samantha Ruth Prabhu - Neethane En Ponvasantham
- 2013 Nayanthara - Raja Rani
  - Amala Paul - Thalaiva
  - Anushka Shetty - Singam 2
  - Hansika Motwani - Theeya Velai Seiyyanum Kumaru
  - Trisha - Endrendrum Punnagai
- 2014 Hansika Motwani - Maan Karate
  - Nayanthara - Idhu Kathirvelan Kadhal
  - Sri Divya - Jeeva
  - Samantha Ruth Prabhu - Kaththi
  - Shruti Haasan - Poojai
- 2017 Nayanthara - Aramm
  - Anushka Shetty - Baahubali 2: The Conclusion
  - Kajal Aggarwal - Vivegam
  - Keerthy Suresh - Bairavaa
  - Samantha Akkineni - Mersal

== Multiple Nominations ==
The following individuals have received two or more Favourite Heroine Nominations:

Wins	Actress
7	Nayanthara
6	Trisha Krishnan, Anushka Shetty
3	Asin, Hansika Motwani, Samantha Ruth Prabhu
2	Shriya Saran, Tamannaah Bhatia, Kajal Aggarwal, Shruti Hasan

== See also ==
- Tamil cinema
- Cinema of India
