= Vijay Award for Favourite Hero =

Indian film award

The Vijay TV Award for Favorite Hero is given by STAR Vijay as part of its annual Vijay Awards ceremony to recognise excellence in Tamil (Kollywood) cinema.

== Multiple Winners ==
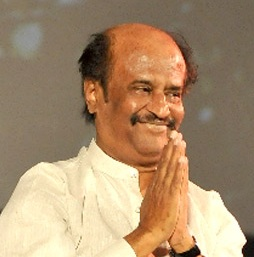
Rajinikanth has three wins (Lingaa, Enthiran, and Sivaji)

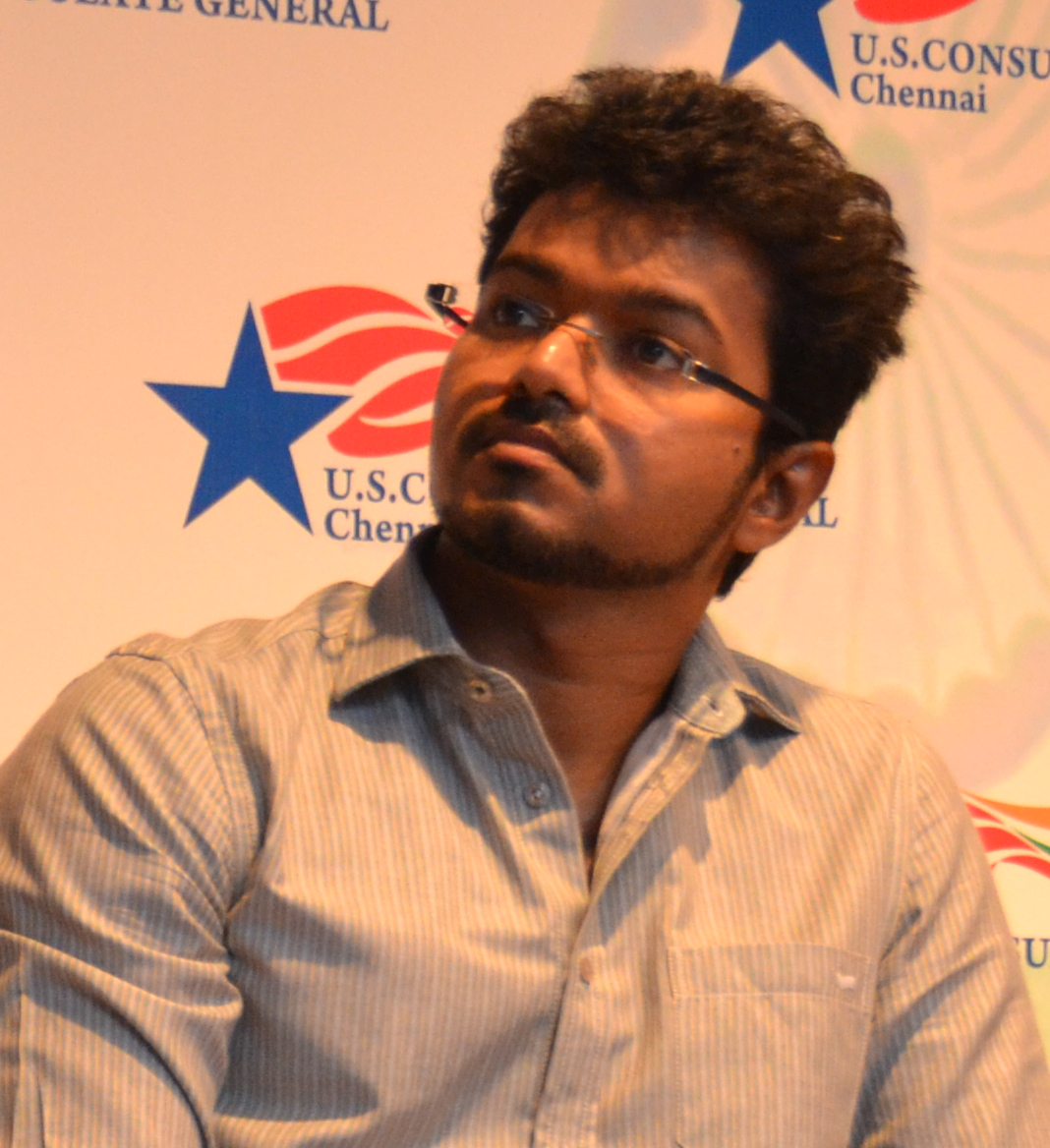
Vijay has four wins (Thalaivaa, Thuppakki, Vettaikaran and Sarkar)

2018	Vijay	Sarkar
2014	Rajinikanth	Lingaa
2013	Vijay	Thalaivaa
2012	Vijay	Thuppakki
2011	Ajith Kumar	Mankatha
2010	Rajinikanth	Enthiran
2009	Vijay	Vettaikaran
2008	Kamal Haasan	Dasavatharam
2007	Rajinikanth	Sivaji
2006	Ajith Kumar	Varalaru

== Winners and nominations ==
- 2006 Ajith Kumar Varalaru
- 2007 Rajnikanth - Sivaji
  - Suriya - Vel
  - Vijay - Pokkiri
  - Ajith Kumar - Billa
  - Dhanush - Polladhavan
- 2008 Kamal Haasan - Dasavathaaram
  - Ajith Kumar - Aegan
  - Suriya - Vaaranam Aayiram
  - Vijay - Kuruvi
  - Vikram - Bheema
- 2009 Vijay - Vettaikaran
  - Kamal Haasan - Unnaipol Oruvan
  - M. Sasikumar - Naadodigal
  - Suriya - Aadhavan
  - Vikram - Kanthaswamy
- 2010 Rajinikanth - Enthiran
  - Ajith Kumar - Aasal
  - Vijay - Sura
  - Kamal Haasan - Manmadan Ambu
  - Suriya - Singam
- 2011 Ajith Kumar - Mankatha
  - Dhanush - Aadukalam
  - Suriya - 7 Aum Arivu
  - Vijay - Velayudham
  - Vikram - Deiva Thirumagal
- 2012 Vijay - Thuppakki
  - Ajith Kumar- Billa 2
  - Dhanush - 3
  - M. Sasikumar - Sundarapandian
  - Suriya - Maattrraan
- 2013 Vijay - Thalaivaa
  - Dhanush - Maryan
  - Suriya - Singam 2
  - Ajith Kumar - Arrambam
  - Kamal Haasan - Vishwaroopam
- 2014 Rajinikanth - Lingaa
  - Ajith Kumar - Veeram
  - Vijay - Kaththi
  - Dhanush - Velaiyilla Pattathari
  - Suriya - Anjaan

== See also ==
- Tamil cinema
- Cinema of India
