= Ready (2011 film) =

2011 Indian film by Anees Bazmee

- Theatrical release poster
- Directed by: Anees Bazmee
- Written by: Screenplay: Rajiv Kaul; Ikram Akhtar; Rajan Aggarwal; Dialogues: Nisar Akhtar; Farhad-Sajid
- Story by: Gopimohan; Kona Venkat
- Based on: Ready (2008) by Srinu Vaitla
- Produced by: Rajat Rawail; Bhushan Kumar; Krishan Kumar; Sohail Khan; Nitin Manmohan
- Starring: Salman Khan; Asin; Paresh Rawal
- Narrated by: Salman Khan
- Cinematography: Sunil Patel
- Edited by: Ritesh Soni
- Music by: Songs: Pritam; Guest Composer: Devi Sri Prasad; Background Score: Sandeep Shirodkar
- Production companies: T-Series Films; Sohail Khan Productions; One Up Entertainment; Rawail Grandsons Entertainment & Software; Wave Cinemas
- Distributed by: Wave Cinemas; One Up Entertainment (India); Eros International (Overseas)
- Release date: 3 June 2011 (India)
- Running time: 145 minutes
- Country: India
- Language: Hindi
- Box office: ₹186.02 crore

Ready is a 2011 Indian Hindi-language action comedy film directed by Anees Bazmee. Produced by T-Series Films, Rawail Grandsons Entertainment and Software Pvt. Ltd. and Sohail Khan Productions, it is an official remake of the 2008 Telugu film of the same name directed by Srinu Vaitla. Based on a script adapted by Rajiv Kaul, Rajan Aggarwal, Ikram Akhtar, Farhad-Sajid and Nisar Akhtar, the film stars Salman Khan and Asin in their second film together after London Dreams. Ready was distributed by Wave Cinemas and One Up Entertainment. Khan also narrated the film, while the story was written by Gopimohan and Kona Venkat, who also penned the 2008 original.

Principal photography commenced in June 2010. The film was shot in Sri Lanka, Bangkok and Mumbai. The first look poster was launched on 5 April 2011. Theatrically released worldwide on 3 June 2011, Ready broke all the records for a non-holiday film It grossed ₹120 crore net in India and ₹180 crore worldwide against its ₹30 crore budget, becoming a massive commercial success. The film received mixed reviews from critics, with praise for its music, humor and Khan's performance, but criticism for its length and script.

A spiritual sequel titled Ready 2 was announced in July 2018.

== Plot ==
Prompt-witted, Prem helps his friend Khushi elope with her lover Raju. This angers her father Abhinav and the Kapoors. Prem pacifies his family, who fix his marriage with a woman, Pooja. Sanjana, who just ran away from her wedding, hears Prem telling his uncle about ditching Pooja. As the Kapoors haven't met her yet, Sanjana poses as her and stays with and soon wins over the Kapoors. Her maternal uncles Amar and Suraj search for a groom to get her married off. While Prem and Sanjana are going to the airport, their car stalls in a forest, forcing them to sleep in the forest, where Prem discovers Sanjana's real identity after he sees her driver's licence.

Suraj takes Sanjana away. Despite knowing the truth, the Kapoors still want her as Prem's wife. Promising Sanjana that he will find a way to marry her, Prem poses as the nephew of Balli, a chartered accountant who serves Amar and Suraj. Soon the Kapoors trick the Chaudharys to let Sanjana marry Prem. Aryan recovers and reveals the truth about Prem, who then explains how Sanjana's late mother Shivani wanted their union and get her married. Amar and Suraj realise their mistake and are forgiven. In the end, Prem and Sanjana get married and click away their wedding pictures.

== Cast ==
- Salman Khan as Prem Kapoor
- Asin as Sanjana Singh (alias Pooja Malhotra): Pooja's imposter
- Paresh Rawal as Balidaan "Balli" Bhardwaj: Amar and Suraj's serving chartered accountant
- Mahesh Manjrekar as Ram Kapoor (alias KK Modi)
- Anuradha Patel as Sumitra Kapoor
- Manoj Joshi as Bharat Kapoor (alias BK Modi)
- Prachee Pathak as Suman Kapoor: Bharat's wife
- Manoj Pahwa as Laxman Kapoor (alias Samrat Mathur)
- Kiran Ahuja as Sheila Kapoor (alias Yatika Mathur)
- Puneet Issar as Ishwar Chaudhary
- Sharat Saxena as Suraj Chaudhary
- Praveena Deshpande as Shalini "Shalu" Chaudhary
- Akhilendra Mishra as Amar Chaudhary
- Gargi Patel as Radhika Chaudhary
- Nikitin Dheer as Aryan Chaudhary
- Arya Babbar as Veer Chandra Tyagi
- Eva Grover as Aisha Chaudhary
- Mohit Baghel as Amar Chaudhary, Jr.
- Jaswinder Gardner as Shakuntala "Shaku" Bhardwaj
- Sudesh Lehri as Lehri
- Arun Bali as Guruji
- Hemant Pandey as Chhote Panditji
- Mithilesh Chaturvedi as Abhinav Pathak
- Amrita Raichand as Pooja Malhotra
- Shalini Sahuta as Naina Paronjkar: Maid of Kapoors
- Kubbra Sait as Sunaina Sethi: Maid of Kapoors
- Rajiv Kachroo as Yuvraj Mehra

=== Special appearances ===
- Kangana Ranaut as Kiran Choksi
- Zareen Khan as Khushi Pathak Sonkar
- Arbaaz Khan as Gaurav Kirloskar
- Ajay Devgn as Rajkumar Sonkar alias Raju
- Sanjay Dutt as Tarachand Agarwal
- Chunky Pandey as Karan: Sanjana's Friend

== Production ==
The film was originally to be shot in Mauritius. However, on the request of Salman Khan, the location was changed to Sri Lanka. Khan described his decision to choose Sri Lanka as its proximity to India and its suitable landscape for Indian productions.

Shooting started on 20 June 2010 in Colombo. The first schedule of shooting lasted for over 27 days at locations in Colombo and the neighbouring Bentota, during which approximately 40% of the filming was completed.

The second schedule of shooting was slated to start in October 2010 but was delayed due to eye problems faced by Salman Khan. The lead actor requested Anees Bazmee to delay the shoot until his condition improved. Shooting started again in Mumbai from 3 November 2010. Portions of Ready were shot at Film City in Mumbai and Cherish Studios at Madh Island in the north of Mumbai.

The final schedule of shooting started in February 2011 in Bangkok. According to reports, actors Ajay Devgan, Sanjay Dutt and Kangana Ranaut, who were shooting in Bangkok for David Dhawan's film, Rascals were called by Salman Khan to become part of the movie. The trio shot for a day doing cameo appearances. Arbaaz Khan and Zarine Khan were also confirmed to have shot for small cameos in the film. The final schedule of shooting was completed in March 2011. Two songs originally filmed in Bangkok, "Character Dheela" and "Dhinka Chika", were re-shot in Mumbai's Film City studios, as according to producer Bhushan Kumar, "the whole [production] team felt that the visuals didn't suit the song." "Character Dheela", which features Salman and newcomer Zarine Khan (in a cameo appearance) is a tribute to veteran actors Raj Kapoor, Dilip Kumar and Dharmendra.

== Soundtrack ==
The soundtrack for Ready is composed by Pritam with Amitabh Bhattacharya, Neelesh Misra and Kumaar serving as lyricists. It was launched on 29 April 2011 at Filmcity, Goregaon, under the banner of T-Series. The album contains four original tracks and four remixes. The item song "Ringa Ringa" from the Telugu film Arya 2 was tweaked and recreated for the film by its original composer, Devi Sri Prasad, who was billed as a guest composer. The song underwent changes to suit the nativity of North Indian audiences, with the revised title set to "Dhinka Chika"; guest songwriter Ashish Pandit wrote the revamped lyrics.

== Release ==
Ready’s release date was first set as 27 May but was later pushed back to 3 June. Advance bookings were opened on 29 May (five days before release) in several multiplexes. It became the first Indian film to release on at least 1000 UFO digital prints and almost 1900 prints in all. The advance at single screens matched that of Dabangg and even bettered it at places. The world premiere took place at Grand Cineplex, Dubai on 1 June 2011.

=== Critical response ===
The film received mixed reviews from critics. Nikhat Kazmi of The Times of India gave it three stars out of five saying, "The film is an unabashed ode to Salman Khan, the entertainer rather than the actor. And yes, it works at that level." Taran Adarsh of Bollywood Hungama awarded the movie four out of five saying, "On the whole, Ready is strictly for the masses and for those who relish typically formulaic masala entertainers. The film prides itself with super music ['Character Dheela' and 'Dhinka Chika'], gags and gimmicks aplenty and of course, Salman Khan, the beloved of the masses and the mainstay of this film." Filmfare also awarded four stars out of five, while commenting, "When it comes to a Salman Khan or a Rajnikant film, their performance is not important. It's the audience performance that counts."

Anupama Chopra of NDTV Movies awarded two stars while commenting, "Thankfully, Ready isn't in the same soul-sucking category as director Anees Bazmee's last two movies: Thank You and No Problem. But it still falls very much into his special brand of brain-dead, anything-for-a-laugh comedy." Raja Sen of Rediff.com awarded the film one and a half stars saying, "Ready doesn't even try to make sense and therefore falls flat.....only it's more extortionate than value for money." Sonia Chopra of Sify awarded two and a half stars while commenting, "The film is unabashedly Salman-centric. He's doing it all: the wise-cracks, gregarious dancing, beating the bad guys, and romancing the girl. All this with his characteristic drawl and swagger." Kunal Guha of Yahoo! Movies gave the movie one star and stated, "...the movie refuses to end, as unnecessary confusions and complications pile up and you wonder if there's enough reel left to clear it all up." Rajeev Masand of CNN-IBN awarded the movie one and a half stars out of five, commenting "'Ready' is strictly for die-hard Salman Khan fans (are there any other kind?) who're willing to forgive the fact that this tasteless, senseless film has no plot to speak of, yet lazily unfolds over two hours and thirty minutes... Salman Khan deserves better than this." Shubhra Gupta from The Indian Express gave the film one star and said "What really kills this film is that its nonsense is neither inventive nor high energy."

Khaleej Times awarded the film three stars commenting, "Bazmi's script, a shoot off of a Telugu hit, accommodates more characters than Goa during the tourist season. Every character is over-dressed and over-the-top." Mayank Shekhar of Hindustan Times gave two stars stating, "Salman's re-grounded masala (Wanted, Dabanng) is still novel for the time being. He walks into Gaiety to briefly say hi to his audiences... It's a pop-cultural experience all right, and fully worth it." Shubha Shetty-Saha of Mid-Day rated it with two and a half stars saying, "The best thing about the movie, of course is Salman Khan. His fans will not be disappointed and yes, they will get to see him topless in the climax." Shalini Saksena of The Pioneer gave the film six out of ten saying, "Believe it or not but Salman Khan is on a roll. After the success of films like Wanted and Dabangg, he is ready with Ready which has his stamp all over it... Though there is nothing spectacular about the storyline, it manages to make you laugh." Preeti Arora from Rediff gave a score of two out of five and said "Ready isn't a tribute to Salman Khan. It's a vehicle which showcases the 'Best of Salman' one has seen over the last twenty years. It entertains in bits."

=== Box office ===
==== India ====
In India, Ready opened to an overwhelming response at the box office and packed cinema halls with single screens reporting nearly 95%–100% occupancy, while multiplexes reported 60% to 100% occupancy, depending on session times. The film collected ₹130 million (US$1.3 million) nett on its first day of business, thus becoming the second highest opening-day grosser across India after Dabangg. On its second day of business, it went on to collect ₹124 million (US$1.3 million), therefore taking the two days nett total to ₹254 million (US$2.6 million). The opening weekend collections of the film have been around ₹423 million (US$4.4 million) nett, making it the second highest opening weekend ever as well as the biggest non-holiday weekend ever. It showed steady collections on Monday with more than ₹70 million (US$730,000) nett, and Tuesday with around ₹65 million (US$670,000) nett, taking the first week nett to ₹695 million (US$7.2 million) nett. The film collected ₹200 million (US$2.1 million) nett over its second weekend, taking the ten-day total revenue to ₹898 million (US$9.3 million) nett. In the second week, the film collected ₹323 million (US$3.4 million), taking the two-week total to ₹1,015 million (US$11 million). Ready thus became the fifth in Bollywood history to collect more than ₹ 1 billion in the domestic market. During the third week, the film fetched a further ₹ 185.5 million bringing the three-week total to ₹1,181 million (US$12 million). Ready collected ₹100 million (US$1.0 million) nett in its fourth week, taking the nett collections to ₹1,286 million (US$13 million). In its fifth week, the film collected around ₹19.6 million (US$200,000), taking the nett collections to ₹1,306 million (US$14 million).

The film grossed ₹1.80 billion (US$19 million) worldwide and managed an all-India distributor share of ₹646 million (US$6.7 million), the third highest ever at the time of its release. Box Office India declared it to be a 'Blockbuster'.Ready held the record for the eighth highest grossing Bollywood film ever made domestically after its theatrical run.

==== Overseas ====
In the overseas markets, the film went on to collect ₹80 million (US$830,000) from US, UK, UAE and other foreign markets over the opening weekend. It did particularly well in the United Arab Emirates grossing $1,200,000 at the end of its second weekend. In the United Kingdom, Ready grossed £495,000 while in North America, it grossed $780,000 at the end of its second weekend. The overall business from all overseas markets reached ₹164 million (US$1.7 million) in ten days. At the end of its fourth week, it collected around ₹234 million (US$2.4 million) from all overseas markets.

== Awards and nominations ==
Awards	Category	Recipients and nominees	Results
BIG Star Entertainment Awards	Most Entertaining Film	Ready	Won
Stardust Awards	Star of the Year – Male	Salman Khan for Ready and Bodyguard	Won
Stardust Awards	Standout Performance by a Lyricist	Ashish Pandit for "Dhinka Chika"	Won
Stardust Awards	Best Film of the Year	Ready	Nominated
Stardust Awards	Dream Director	Anees Bazmee	Nominated
Stardust Awards	Best Actor – Comedy or Romance	Salman Khan	Nominated
Stardust Awards	Best Actress – Comedy or Romance	Asin	Nominated
Zee Cine Awards	Best Song of the Year	"Character Dheela"	Nominated
4th Mirchi Music Awards	Best Item Song of the Year	"Character Dheela"	Nominated
International Indian Film Academy Awards	Best Comedian	Paresh Rawal	Nominated
Ghanta Awards	Worst Actor	Salman Khan for Ready and Bodyguard	Won
Ghanta Awards	Worst Song	"Dhinka Chika"	Won
Ghanta Awards	Worst Film	Ready	Nominated

== See also ==
- List of highest-grossing Indian films
