= Sivamani (film) =

- Directed by: Puri Jagannadh
- Written by: Story & Screenplay: Puri Jagannadh; Dialogues: Kona Venkat
- Produced by: Puri Jagannadh
- Starring: Nagarjuna Akkineni; Asin Thottumkal; Rakshitha; Prakash Raj
- Cinematography: Shyam K. Naidu
- Edited by: Marthand K. Venkatesh
- Music by: Chakri
- Production company: Vaishno Academy
- Distributed by: DVV Entertainments
- Release date: 23 October 2003
- Running time: 143 minutes
- Country: India
- Language: Telugu
- Box office: ₹10 crore distributors' share

Sivamani is a 2003 Indian Telugu-language romantic action film co-written, directed and produced by Puri Jagannadh on Vaishno Academy banner. The film stars Nagarjuna Akkineni, Asin, Rakshitha, and Prakash Raj. It has music composed by Chakri. A part of the story has been taken from the movie Message in a Bottle released in 1999 which in turn was inspired by Message in a Bottle - the Nicholas Sparks novel.

Sivamani turned out be a success.

== Plot ==
Pallavi, a newspaper editor, finds a mysterious typed love letter in a bottle in the seashore. She is fascinated by it and shows it to her colleagues. They print it in their newspaper and get numerous responses. Pallavi, due to her personal curiosity, tries to reach Sivamani, but he ignores her. Rajnikanth helps Pallavi get close to Sivamani, and his past is revealed. Sivamani is an honest cop in Visakhapatnam (Vizag). He falls in love with Vasanta, who aspires to become a singer. Dattu is a mafia don, whom Sivamani troubles a lot.

Vasanta is distantly related to Dattu, and both of them are from Kerala. In the course of events, Sivamani's mother becomes paralyzed. Sivamani and Vasanta take her to Kerala to get Ayurveda treatments. Dattu is also in Kerala, and his mission is to get his revenge by taking Vasanta away from Sivamani. Vasanta becomes mute after Dattu punctures her voice box. The rest of the story is about how Sivamani gets Vasanta back with Pallavi's help.

== Cast ==
- Nagarjuna Akkineni as CI Sivamani
- Rakshitha as Pallavi
- Asin as Vasantha
- Prakash Raj as Dattu
- Sangeetha as Sivamani's mother
- Mohan Raj as Vasanta's father
- Ali as Rajnikanth
- Banerjee as ACP
- Vinod Bala as Dattu's henchman
- Brahmaji as Dattu's henchman
- M. S. Narayana as Sheikh Imam's client
- AVS as Pallavi's boss
- Bandla Ganesh as person who keeps calling M. S. Narayana
- Besant Ravi
- Ooma
- Nisha

== Soundtrack ==
Sivamani

Film score by Chakri
- Released: 25 September 2003
- Genre: Soundtrack
- Length: 26:35
- Label: Sohan Music
- Producer: Chakri

Chakri chronology
Donga Ramudu and Party (2003)	Sivamani (2003)	Oka Raju Oka Rani (2003)

Music was composed by Chakri. Music was released on SOHAN Audio Company.

No.	Title	Lyrics	Singer(s)	Length
1.	"Yenaatiki"	Bhaskarabhatla Ravikumar	Raghu Kunche, Kousalya	5:13
2.	"Goldrangu"	Kandikonda	Ravi Varma, Revathi	4:55
3.	"Yelo Yelo"	Vishwa	Smita	4:39
4.	"Rama Rama"	Kandikonda	Kousalya	1:27
5.	"Mona Mona"	Chakri	Hariharan, Kousalya	5:39
6.	"Sun Sun"	Kandikonda	Shankar Mahadevan, Kousalya	4:42
Total length:				26:35

== Reception ==
Sify gave the film a verdict of 'let down' and opined, "The much hyped Sivamani-9848022338 is a kichidi that neither pleases the classes nor the masses". Jeevi of Idlebrain wrote, "You can watch this film for Nagarjuna and the cool flashback episode of the first half". Mithun Verma of Full Hyderabad wrote, "But overall, Puri has paid too much attention to untimely gimmicks and tried to cram in everything possible into Shivamani".

The dialogue of the character Sivamani "Na peru Sivamani, nakkonchem mental" (transl. My name is Sivamani, I am a bit mental) became popular during the early 2000s.

== Awards ==
- M. S. Narayana won Nandi Award for Best Male Comedian for this film.

== Legal issues ==
A legal suit was filed by an individual who owns the phone number alleging that the makers of the film did not attain his permission to use the phone number in the film. He alleged that he received calls from people in the hopes of speaking to Nagarjuna, and that it had caused him "immense agony".

== Legacy ==
In April 2020, during the lockdown because of the COVID-19 pandemic in India, a short video from the film was shared by Nagarjuna, in which the dialogues of Sivamani were mimicked and replaced, with a warning to the goons of not wearing masks and asks them to wear masks and maintain social distance.
