= Aalwar =

2007 film directed by Chella

- Poster
- Directed by: S. Shella
- Written by: Chella; Ravi Mariya (dialogues)
- Produced by: Mohan Natarajan
- Starring: Ajith Kumar; Asin; Keerthi Chawla
- Cinematography: G. Ramesh
- Edited by: V. T. Vijayan
- Music by: Srikanth Deva
- Production company: Sri Rajakaliamman Super Films
- Release date: 12 January 2007
- Running time: 162 minutes
- Country: India
- Language: Tamil

Aalwar is a 2007 Indian Tamil-language action film directed by S. Shella (in his directoral debut) and produced by Mohan Natarajan. The film stars Ajith Kumar and Asin in the lead roles. Vivek, Keerthi Chawla, Lal, Shwetha Bandekar and Aditya Srivastava appear in other pivotal roles. The film's score and soundtrack is by Srikanth Deva while the cinematography was by G. Ramesh. Aalwar released on 12 January 2007.

== Plot ==
Aalwar is a Hindu priest in Madurai and he is devoted to his mother and sister. But Punniyamoorthy and his brothers, the heir of the Temple where Aalwar works as priest, kill Aalwar's sister and mother due to an old dispute with Aalwar. Aalwar, with revenge ringing in his mind, ends up as a killer, even while working as a ward boy in a hospital. He rechristens himself as Mortuary Shiva and is out to make a statement against the venal forces. He sees himself as some kind of avatar. In fact, he bumps off the baddies under the getup of Lord Rama and Lord Krishna. In the climax, Shiva turns up as Lord Narasimha and bumps off the last villain by placing him on his thighs and ripping apart his bowels and chest with his sharp claws. He successfully escapes from the police of Chennai and continues his process of "Dharma".

== Cast ==
- Ajith Kumar as Aalwar aka 'Mortuary' Shiva
- Asin as Priya
- Vivek as Ponds
- Manorama as Priya's grandmother
- Geetha as Shiva's mother
- Lal as Punniyamoorthy
- Aditya Srivastava as ACP Rajashekar (Madhu's Brother)
- Keerthi Chawla as Madhu
- Shwetha Bandekar as Kalpana (Shiva's sister)
- Vincent Asokan as Punniyamoorthy's brother
- Aryan as Punniyamoorthy's brother
- Sathyan as Ponds's friend
- Mayilsamy as Costumed Hanuman
- Pandu as Purohit
- T. P. Gajendran as Police constable
- Cell Murugan as Ponds's friend
- Siva Narayana Murthy as Police inspector
- Vijay Sethupathi as Accused in photo (uncredited)
- Cool Suresh as Accused in photo (uncredited)

== Production ==
The film began at the Ramoji Rao Studios in Hyderabad in August 2006 where a hospital set was built, with Ajith putting on weight for the film.

== Soundtrack ==
The soundtrack was composed by Srikanth Deva.

Track listing
No.	Title	Lyrics	Singer(s)	Length
1.	"Anbulla Kadhali"	Kabilan	Shaan, Kushbu	4:40
2.	"Mayile Mayile"	Vaali	Srikanth Deva, Senthildass Velayutham, Roshini, Suruthipriya, Arjun Thamas, Sujavitha	4:12
3.	"Pallaandu"	Vaali	P. Unnikrishnan, Senthildass Velayutham	5:10
4.	"Pidikkum"	Vaali	Madhushree	4:47
5.	"Solli Tharava"	Vaali	Sadhana Sargam, Muhamad Salamad	5:28
Total length:				24:17

== Release and reception ==
The film was released on 12 January 2007 during Pongal alongside Vijay's Pokkiri and Vishal's Thaamirabharani. Sify praised Ajith and Asin's performances but criticized the plot of the movie by labelling it as a "built on a predictable premise". Rediff.com's review concluded that "Chella's directorial debut lacks originality and is a hotch potch of celebrated scripts of the past. Malini Mannath of Chennai Online wrote "With an absurd script, insipid narration, and with neither the role nor the performance working out here for him, it's like Ajith has lost whatever ground he'd gained with his splendid performance in 'Varalaru'". Lajjavathu of Kalki wrote this is director Chella's debut film. The screenplay could have been more intense. Since the stories of revenge have already been seen in many different ways in many films and it is not told in a new way in Aalwar, we could not connect with the film.

Cinesouth wrote "Ajith believes that he's god incarnate and vanquishes the bad guys with superhuman strength. It's not that spiritual as much as it's a downslide in the screenplay. Chella could have paid more attention to making the story and screenplay more compact and credible". Malathi Rangarajan of The Hindu wrote "So what if Ajit is out of Bala's Naan Kadavul? In Aazhwar he dons the attire and apes the appearance of the Gods, claiming he is one, thus adding a touch of religiosity to his vengeance spree and also sending a message across. Thrill plays a solid part in the sequences where the hero is on the verge of getting nabbed by the police for his bloody actions. But much of Aazhwar is so very similar to what you have seen in cinema all along that it begins to appear clichéd".
