= Asin =

Indian former actress (born 1985)

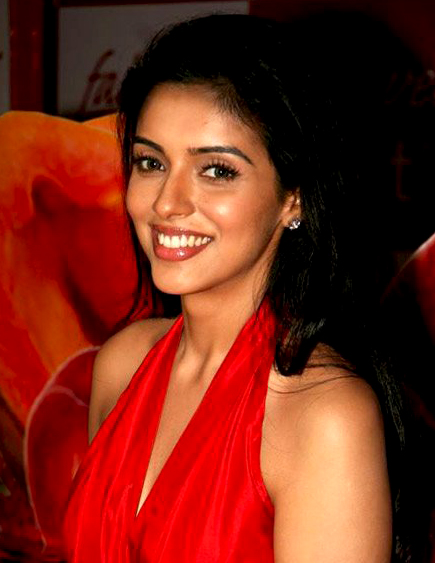
- Asin in 2013
- Born: Asin Thottumkal; 26 October 1985 (age 41); Cochin, Kerala, India
- Education: St. Teresa's College
- Occupations: Actress; model; dancer
- Years active: 2001–2015
- Works: Full list
- Spouse: Rahul Sharma (m. 2016)
- Children: 1
- Awards: Full list

Asin Thottumkal (born 26 October 1985), known mononymously as Asin, is an Indian former actress who appeared predominantly in Tamil, Hindi and Telugu films. Asin is a recipient of several accolades including a Filmfare Award, two Filmfare Awards South and four SIIMA Awards. The Government of Tamil Nadu honoured her with the state's highest civilian award Kalaimamani, in 2009. Asin is considered as one of the leading South Indian actresses of the 2000s and is referred to as the "Queen of Kollywood".

A trained Bharatanatyam dancer, Asin made her acting debut at 15 in Sathyan Anthikkad's Malayalam film Narendran Makan Jayakanthan Vaka (2001). Asin had her first commercial success with the Telugu film Amma Nanna O Tamila Ammayi in 2003, and won a Filmfare Best Telugu Actress Award for the film. M. Kumaran Son of Mahalakshmi (2004) was her debut in Tamil and a huge success. She received her Filmfare Best Tamil Actress Award for her most noted critically acclaimed performance in her third Tamil film, Ghajini (2005). She then played the lead female roles in many successful films, the most notable being the action films Sivakasi (2005), Varalaru (2006), Pokkiri (2007), Vel (2008) and Dasavathaaram (2008), establishing herself as the leading actress of Tamil cinema. In 2013, Asin was given the Pride of South Indian Cinema award at SIIMA for her contribution to Tamil cinema.

In late 2008, Asin made her debut in the Bollywood film Ghajini (2008), opposite Aamir Khan, which was the first Bollywood film to have collected more than ₹1 billion in the domestic box office, subsequently collecting ₹1.9 billion (US$20 million) worldwide. Asin won the Filmfare Best Female Debut Award and many accolades for Ghajini. 2011 marked the most successful phase of Asin's Bollywood career, as she starred in Anees Bazmee's romantic comedy Ready, in which she co-starred alongside Salman Khan. The film was a major hit at the box office, collecting ₹1.84 billion (US$20 million) worldwide. In 2012, Asin first starred in Sajid Khan's multistarrer Housefull 2, which collected more than ₹1 billion. She then featured in Bol Bachchan and Khiladi 786, which were commercially successful with both grossing over ₹1 billion. The 2015 film, All Is Well was her 25th milestone film and also her last film, afterwards, she retired from acting. She is married to businessman Rahul Sharma, with whom she has a daughter.

== Early life ==
Asin Thottumkal was born on 26 October 1985 in Kochi, Kerala into a family adhering to the Syro-Malabar Church. Her father, Joseph Thottumkal, is an ex-CBI officer and later managed several businesses. Her mother, Seline Thottumkal, who moved from Kochi to Chennai and then to Mumbai to live with her daughter, is a medical surgeon.

According to custom, Asin was to be named Mary, after her paternal grandmother, but her father named her Asin, as the name had a beautiful meaning. Asin has quoted that her name means pure or without blemish. She states that the 'A' in her name is from Sanskrit, meaning" "without," and "sin" is from English.

Asin attended Naval Public School from LKG through X standard. She then attended St. Teresa's School in Kochi for her Kerala Higher Secondary Examination Board (Plus Two) education. After that, she attended St. Teresa's College in Kochi, where she graduated with a Bachelor of Arts degree in English Literature.

== Career ==
=== Debut and early work (2001–2004) ===
Asin's first assignment was an advertisement for BPL Mobile. She debuted in the Malayalam film Narendran Makan Jayakanthan Vaka in 2001, at the age of 15. After taking a year off to pursue her education, Asin returned in 2003 with her breakthrough film, Amma Nanna O Tamila Ammayi opposite Ravi Teja, portraying a Tamil girl in her first Telugu film, which subsequently fetched her the Filmfare Award for Best Actress – Telugu. The film was a commercial success, with Jeevi of Idlebrain.com stating that Asin "acts well" but doesn't add much to the film. That year, she won the Santosham Best Actress Award for her performance alongside Nagarjuna in her second Telugu film Shivamani.

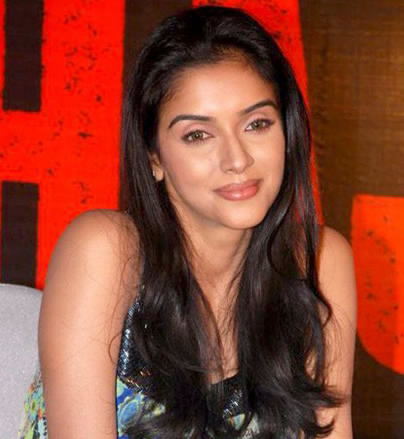
Asin, during the success event of her film Ghajini

Asin had two Telugu releases in 2004: Lakshmi Narasimha alongside Nandamuri Balakrishna and Gharshana opposite Venkatesh. In both these films, Asin portrayed the love interest for police officers and both were successful ventures. Critics found her performance in Gharshana to be "tender" and "adorable". In the same year, Asin appeared in her first Tamil film was M. Kumaran Son of Mahalakshmi, portraying a Malayali girl opposite Jayam Ravi, reprising her role from the original Amma Nanna O Tamila Ammayi. The film was a box office success and introduced Asin to the Tamil film industry. The Hindu opined that she "fits the bill".

=== Breakthrough and stardom in South Indian films (2005–2007) ===
After her first Telugu film of 2005, Chakram with Prabhas, which was a box office failure, Asin shifted her focus to Tamil films with Ullam Ketkumae. The film, initially launched in 2002, was supposed to be her debut, and is a college love story, which was long-delayed but eventually became a successful venture at the box office, creating wider opportunities for her. Following this Asin had two releases- Sivakasi, opposite Vijay, and Majaa, opposite Vikram. Despite the latter becoming an average grosser, the former went on to be a successful venture at the box office. S. R. Ashok Kumsr stated that she "proves her mettle" in the opening scenes of Majaa.

Asin was cited as a leading actress of the Tamil film industry after starring in blockbuster films Ghajini, Sivakasi, Varalaru and Pokkiri respectively. The film which provided her breakthrough was Ghajini, opposite Suriya. Her portrayal of a young model named Kalpana earned her the Filmfare Award for Best Actress – Tamil. Sify.com praised her portrayal as "magical", describing her character as a "lovable chatterbox" played with "sheer ability in the romantic interludes, the poignant and heartfelt scenes when she rescues minor girls from villains and her gory end are touching". Ghajini went on to become one of the highest-grossing film of the year.

The following year, her long-delayed venture Varalaru, opposite Ajith Kumar, succeeded at the box office, and Malathi Rangarajan of The Hindu noted that she "looks lustrous and sails through her role smoothly". Asin then appeared opposite Pawan Kalyan in Annavaram, another successful venture, which marked her final Telugu film. I

In her first film of 2007, Asin played the lead opposite Ajith Kumar in Aalwar, which became a box office failure. Sify noted that she looks a "million bucks", but has nothing much to do. She then reunited with Vijay for Pokkiri, which was a major success. Shwetha Bhaskar termed her the film's "saving grace". In her last film of the year, Asin appeared in Vel, opposite Suriya, which subsequently became her third successful film released during the Diwali season in three years. Asin portrayed a TV anchor, and TSV Hari found her to be "adequate".

=== Expansion to Hindi films (2008–2010) ===
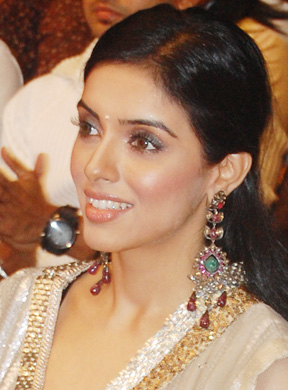
Asin in 2010

Asin appeared in dual roles in Dasavathaaram, her first release of 2008, opposite Kamal Haasan, who had ten roles. Asin portrayed a Vaishnavite in 12th century Tamil Nadu and a Brahmin girl from Chidambaram in the film, for which she won her first ITFA Best Actress Award. R G Vijayasarathy of Rediff.com found her to be "excellent". A critic from The Hindu was appreciative of her character Kodhai for its "moving intensity". It became a box office blockbuster.

After establishing herself as a leading actress in South India, Asin ventured into Hindi films with Ghajini, a 2008 remake of her Tamil film of the same name. She reprised Kalpana opposite Aamir Khan. Taran Adarsh noted: "Asin is fabulous. She looks fresh and photogenic and acts her part brilliantly." Shubhra Gupta called her the "best part" of the film. Ghajini became the highest grossing Hindi film of the year, grossing over Rs 194 crore at the box-office. For her performance, she won the Filmfare Award for Best Female Debut.

In her only film the following year, London Dreams, Asin played a music enthusiast from a conservative South Indian family opposite Salman Khan and Ajay Devgn. In his review, Rajeev Masand criticized her performance and character. The film was a commercial failure. Asin had no film release in 2010.

=== Commercial success and final work (2011–2015) ===
Asin returned to Tamil films, with her first film of 2011, Kaavalan, opposite Vijay, which was a commercial success and won her the SIIMA Award for Best Actress – Tamil. Pavithra Srinivasan found her "pretty" and added, "Asin had few moments to act as well, she does her best but isn't convincing." Kaavalan became Asin's last Tamil film. Later the year, Asin reunited with Salman Khan in Ready, playing an NRI girl. Ready was a commercial success, earning over ₹1.8 billion (US$19 million). Koel Purie Rinchet of India Today stated that she matches Khan "repartee for repartee".

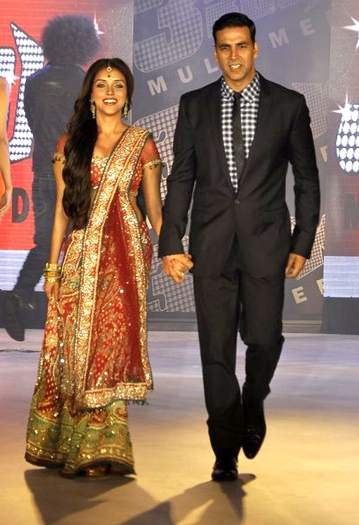
Asin with Akshay Kumar on the Ramp during Housefull 2 promotions in 2012

Asin had three Hindi film releases in 2012. Asin first played an animal lover opposite Akshay Kumar, in the multistarrer Housefull 2. Taran Adarsh noted: "[a]mongst the female leads, Asin has the meatiest role and gives a decent account of herself." The film went onto become a major commercial success. Then, she played a Muslim girl pretending to be a Hindu in Bol Bachchan opposite Ajay Devgn, which became another box office success. Sukanya Verma opined that Asin had "very little to do". Khiladi 786, which reunited her with Akshay Kumar was her final film of the year, and saw her playing a Marathi girl. Subhash K. Jha found her to be back in "fetching form" post her work in Ghajini. The film was yet another box office success, making it Asin's most successful year in Hindi films.

Post a two-year hiatus from films, Asin played the lead in All Is Well, opposite Abhishek Bachchan. In one interview, director Umesh Shukla stated that Asin would be seen in an "important dramatic role". The film was a box office average. Ananya Bhattacharya termed her performance "passable". It remains Asin's final film, as she retired from acting the following year.

== Off-screen work ==
=== Humanitarian work ===
During the shoot of her film Ready in Sri Lanka, she was part of camps that were meant to help the Sri Lankan Tamil people who were affected by the Sri Lankan Civil War.

In an interview during the DNA I Can Women's Half Marathon in 2012, Asin, speaking about the importance of health and the necessity of education said:

This cause is probably one of the biggest women-centric issues in our country. I support the education of six children each year, five of which are girls. I have closely worked with these children and I know that if given the opportunity, women can educate themselves much better and know what is wrong or right for them. Education is a basic right and women should not be deprived of that.

=== Brand ambassador ===
Asin has been the brand ambassador for several companies and products, and has appeared in commercials for Avon, Mirinda, Colgate, Fairever, Tanishq, Big Bazaar, Parachute, Spinz talc, Lux, Amrutanjan Healthcare, and Clinic All Clear. Asin had been endorsing Mirinda soft drinks since 2004 until her retirement.

== Personal life ==
Asin is a Syro-Malabar Catholic Christian and resided in Mumbai. She owns an apartment in Marine Drive, Kochi, and a farmhouse in Vagamon. She moved to Delhi in 2016 after her wedding.

Asin is a polyglot. She can speak seven languages, being well-versed in Malayalam (her mother tongue), Tamil, Telugu, Sanskrit, English, Hindi, and French. She also speaks basic Italian and Marathi. In June 2013, it was reported in the Indian media that Asin was learning German during her free time. She began learning Spanish after visiting Spain in early 2014.

Asin married Micromax co-founder Rahul Sharma in January 2016 in a Christian wedding ceremony that was followed by a Hindu wedding ceremony, and quit acting after marriage. Their first child, a daughter, was born on 24 October 2017.

== In the media ==
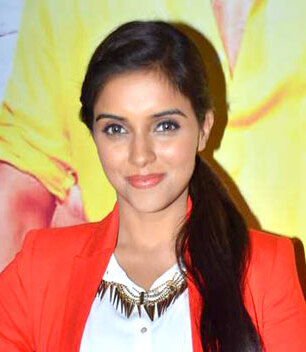
Asin at an event for Bol Bachchan, in 2012

Following the Tamil film Ghajini, Rediff.com placed Asin 2nd in its "Best Tamil Actresses" list of 2005. For the 2008 Hindi film Ghajini, Asin was placed in its "Top Ten Actresses in Bollywood" list and was named as one of the "Best Debut Actor" of the year. In the Times 50 Most Desirable Women list, Asin was placed 11th in 2010, 17th in 2011 and 16th in 2012. In Chennai Times Most Desirable Women list, Asin was placed 12th in 2012. Times of India placed her at 16th position in its "50 Beautiful Faces" list. She has been called a sex symbol by the media. Asin was among the highest-grossing actresses in Indian cinema.

== Accolades ==
Asin received two Filmfare Awards nominations – Best Female Debut and Best Actress, both for Ghajini, and winning the former. Additionally, she received eighth Filmfare Awards South nominations – Best Actress – Telugu for Amma Nanna O Tamila Ammayi and Sivamani, which she won for the former and Best Actress – Tamil for M. Kumaran S/O Mahalakshmi, Majaa, Ghajini, Pokkiri, Dasavathaaram and Kavalan, winning only for Ghajini.

== See also ==
- List of Indian film actresses
- List of Indian actresses
