= Rakshita (name) =

Rakshita or Rakshitha is an Indian name. Notable people with the name include:

- Rakshita, Indian television personality
- Rakshita Suresh, Indian singer
- Rakshitha Raju, Indian runner
- Rakshitta Ravi, Indian chess player

== See also ==
- Rakshit (disambiguation)
- Rakshith (disambiguation)
