= All Is Well (2015 film) =

2015 film directed by Umesh Shukla

All is Well
- Theatrical Release Poster
- Directed by: Umesh Shukla
- Written by: Sumit Arora; Niren Bhatt
- Story by: Umesh Shukla
- Produced by: Shyam Bajaj; Varun Bajaj; Bhushan Kumar; Krishan Kumar
- Starring: Abhishek Bachchan; Asin; Rishi Kapoor; Supriya Pathak
- Cinematography: Sameer Arya
- Edited by: Sanjay Sankla
- Music by: Songs: Himesh Reshammiya; Mithoon; Amaal Mallik; Meet Bros Anjjan; Background Score: Sanjoy Chowdhury
- Production companies: Allchemy Productions; T-Series
- Distributed by: Magic Cloud Media & Entertainment (Overseas)
- Release date: 21 August 2015
- Running time: 126 minutes
- Country: India
- Language: Hindi
- Box office: ₹180.2 million

All Is Well is a 2015 Indian Hindi-language romantic comedy-drama film directed by Umesh Shukla and produced by Bhushan Kumar, Krishan Kumar, Shyam Bajaj and Varun Bajaj. It stars Abhishek Bachchan, Asin, Rishi Kapoor, and Supriya Pathak. The film was released on 21 August 2015. This marked Asin's final film appearance before her retirement from the film industry. The film's title is based on a song from the 2009 film 3 Idiots.

== Plot ==
Inder Bhalla, an aspiring song composer, is kicked out of his house by his father, Bhajanglal. Bhajanglal runs a bakery he wants Inder to work at, but Inder refuses due to his ambitions of becoming a successful song composer, resulting in him being kicked out. Inder travels to Thailand with his friend Ronny (Sumeet Vyas) who is also an ambitious song composer. Inder misses his mother, Pammi Bhalla, whom he hasn't talked to in several years. Inder gets a phone call from Cheema.

Cheema lies to Inder, telling him that his father sold the bakery and wants to give him some of the money from the sale. Inder flies back to India, hugging his girlfriend Nimmi goodbye at the airport, unbeknownst to the fact that she was also travelling to India on the same flight. When Inder and Nimmi reach India they catch the same taxi as Nimmi wants to visit Inder's house. Inder drops Nimmi at his house and goes to visit Cheema. There he finds out that his father has apparently been abducted by Cheema and his accomplices. Inder learns that over the years his father borrowed money from Cheema, and was unable to repay his debts. Cheema demands a ransom in order for Bhajanglal and Inder to stay alive. Inder and Bhajanglal go home to think of something. There, Inder finds out that his mother is suffering from Alzheimer's disease and Bhajanglal sends her to an ashram.

Inder, Bhajanglal, Pammi and Nimmi try to run away from Cheema. They go to a bank on their way to withdraw money from Pammi's brother's account. Bhajanglal signs the form due to Pammi's memory loss. There, Inder learns that his father has divorced his mother, increasing his hatred towards him. Bhalanglal tells Inder that it wasn't his fault and there were deeper reasons behind his and Pammi's divorce. After restituting what he has learnt, Inder realises that his father was always innocent and starts loving him again. Inder sells all his songs that he had composed to pay back Cheema, gets his parents married again, marries Nimmi, and renovates his father's bakery. The film ends with Inder, Nimmy, Bhajanglal and Cheema (now their friend) working at the now-profitable bakery.

== Cast ==
- Abhishek Bachchan as Inder Bhalla
- Asin as Nimmi Bhalla
- Rishi Kapoor as Bhajanglal Bhalla
- Supriya Pathak as Parminder Bhalla (Pammi)
- Mohammed Zeeshan Ayyub as Cheema
- Seema Bhargava as Mamiji
- Sumeet Vyas as Ronny
- Sonakshi Sinha in cameo appearance in the song Nachan Farrate

== Production ==
=== Development ===
Director Shukla scouted several locations for filming, such as in Dubai and various cities in India.

=== Filming ===
The shooting of the film commenced on 16 October 2013, which was confirmed by Abhishek Bachchan on Twitter. Shukla shot the film in Nashik, Maharashtra, Himachal Pradesh, Sikkim, Dubai, London, and Thailand.

== Release ==
=== Box office ===
The film collected an estimated ₹2.9 crore on opening day, which is among the lowest first-day totals of 2015. and by the end of the fifth day, it was estimated that the film had grossed approximately ₹159.1 million.

=== Critical reception ===
The film received mixed reviews following its release. Mihir Fadnavis, writing for the Hindustan Times, gave the film a rating of 1 out of 5, commenting that "there is no logic to All is Well, and even less comedy. I left the theatre without having laughed once." The Guardian gave the film 2 out of 5 stars, and said that the film "features mopey tunes, torturous exposition – and cuckoo sound effects to help underperforming gags on their way." Raja Sen, writing for Rediff, summarized it as a "lazy, idiotic film," and rated it 1 out of 5. Srijana Mitra Das of Times of India gave the film 3 stars of 5, praising the performances, but noting that the film seemed dated at times and lacked depth. Bollywood Hungama gave the film 3.5 out of 5, praising the performances of Abhishek and Asin. They further said, "On the whole, ALL IS WELL is a family entertainer that will effortlessly charm you and gently carve a place in your heart."

== Soundtrack ==
The music for All Is Well is composed by Himesh Reshammiya, Amaal Mallik, Mithoon and Meet Bros Anjjan while the lyrics are by Shabbir Ahmed, Mayur Puri and Kumaar. The music rights for the film are acquired by T-Series. The album was released on 20 July 2015. Aye Mere Humsafar from the film Qayamat Se Qayamat Tak, composed by Anand–Milind and written by Majrooh Sultanpuri was recreated as Mere Humsafar by Mithoon.

Track listing
No.	Title	Lyrics	Music	Singer(s)	Length
1.	"Baaton Ko Teri"	Shabbir Ahmed	Himesh Reshammiya	Arijit Singh	4:40
2.	"Mere Humsafar"	Amitabh Verma	Mithoon	Mithoon, Tulsi Kumar	5:53
3.	"Nachan Farrate"	Kumaar	Meet Bros Anjjan	Kanika Kapoor, Meet Bros Anjjan	4:34
4.	"Chaar Shanivaar"	Shabbir Ahmed	Amaal Mallik	Vishal Dadlani, Rap by: Badshah	3:34
5.	"Tu Milade"	Mayur Puri	Himesh Reshammiya	Ankit Tiwari	4:38
6.	"YOLO"	Kumaar	Himesh Reshammiya	Sreerama Chandra	3:38
Total length:					26:58

A remix album of the film's soundtrack was released on 10 August 2015 on T-Series YouTube channel which includes three remixed songs of the original album.

No.	Title	Lyrics	Music	Singer(s)	Length
1.	"Baaton Ko Teri" (Remix)	Shabbir Ahmed	Himesh Reshammiya, DJ Paroma (additional production; remix)	Arijit Singh	3:21
2.	"Mere Humsafar" (Remix)	Amitabh Verma	Mithoon, DJ J-YA (additional production; remix)	Mithoon, Tulsi Kumar	4:58
3.	"Nachan Farrate" (MB Swag)	Kumaar	Meet Bros Anjjan, DJ Chetas (collaborative/additional production; remix/reproduction)	Meet Bros Anjjan, Kanika Kapoor	3:53
Total length:					12:12
