= Narendran Makan Jayakanthan Vaka =

2001 film by Sathyan Anthikad

- Poster
- Directed by: Sathyan Anthikad
- Written by: Sreenivasan
- Produced by: C. Karunakaran
- Starring: Kunchacko Boban; Samyuktha Varma; Asin
- Cinematography: Vipin Mohan
- Edited by: K. Rajagopal
- Music by: Johnson
- Production company: Carlton Films
- Distributed by: Jiyo Movies
- Release date: 24 August 2001
- Running time: 160 minutes
- Country: India
- Language: Malayalam

Narendran Makan Jayakanthan Vaka (transl. Property of Narendran's son Jayakanthan) is a 2001 Indian Malayalam-language satirical film directed by Sathyan Anthikkad and written by Sreenivasan. The film stars Kunchacko Boban, Samyuktha Varma and Asin. The story follows Jayakanthan (Kunchacko Boban), who comes from Kumbakonam, to his late father's village in Paruthippara, Kannur district, to claim his father's property. The film marks the acting debut of Asin, aged fifteen in 2001; however this remains her only Malayalam film ever. The film was released on 24 August 2001, coinciding with the festival of Onam.

== Plot ==
The story centres on Jayakanthan, who has returned to the village where he and his father, Narendran, were born and raised in order to claim his inheritance. There, he meets Vinodini, the strict president of the village council who adheres rigidly to the rules. However, Swathi's father, Balakrishnan Nambiar, is worried that Jayakanthan intends to marry Swathi and take over the family estate. Bhargavan stole Narendran's land, but Jayakanthan is unaware of this, so he befriends him. The rest of the plot concerns how events unfold.

== Cast ==
- Kunchacko Boban as Jayakanthan
- Samyuktha Varma as Panchayath President Vinodhini
- Asin as Swathi
- Sreenivasan as Bhargavan
- KPAC Lalitha as Kunjulakshmi
- Parthiban as Narendran aka Devakashayam
- Janardhanan as Balakrishnan Nair
- Innocent as Johny Vellikkala
- Cochin Haneefa as Kittunni
- Oduvil Unnikrishnan as "Naxal" Vasu
- Mamukkoya as Nambeesan
- Sukumari as Aishumma
- Bhavani as Vinodini's mother
- Bindu Panicker as Soudamini
- Vettukili Prakash
- Kulappulli Leela as Sharada
- Remya Nambeeshan as Sethulekshmi, Jayankanthan's sister
- Monilal As Panchyath Secretary
- Rajan Padur as Bomb Maker
- Mahesh

== Soundtrack ==
Narendran Makan Jayakanthan Vaka

Soundtrack album by Johnson
- Genre: Film
- Language: Malayalam

The film features songs composed by Johnson and written by Mullanezhi.

Song title	Singer
Aaraarumariyaathoru Omanakkauthukam	K. J. Yesudas
"Ammayum Nanmayum"	Sujatha Mohan, chorus
"Karutha Raavinte" (F)	K. S. Chithra
"Karutha Raavinte" (M)	G. Venugopal
"Vasantham Varna" (F)	K. S. Chithra, chorus
"Vasantham Varna" (M)	K. J. Yesudas, chorus
