= Vel (film) =

2007 film directed by Hari

- Directed by: Hari
- Written by: Hari
- Produced by: M. Chinthamani
- Starring: Suriya; Asin; Kalabhavan Mani; Vadivelu
- Cinematography: Priyan
- Edited by: V. T. Vijayan
- Music by: Yuvan Shankar Raja
- Production company: Sree Rajakaalaiamman Medias
- Distributed by: Kalasangham Films
- Release date: 8 November 2007
- Running time: 161 minutes
- Country: India
- Language: Tamil

Vel (/veɪl/ transl. Spear) is a 2007 Indian Tamil-language action drama film directed by Hari and produced by M. Chinthamani under Sree Rajakaalaiamman Medias. It stars Suriya in dual lead roles, alongside Kalabhavan Mani, Vadivelu, Asin, Nassar, Charan Raj, Lakshmi, Saranya Ponvannan and Ambika. The music, cinematography and editing were handled by Yuvan Shankar Raja, Priyan and V. T. Vijayan.

Vel was released on 8 November 2007, coinciding with Diwali, and became a commercial success.

== Plot ==
Thiyagarajan and Sharadha, a couple who have twins, lose one of them while traveling between Madurai and Chennai. The child stolen by a beggar for its gold chain is abandoned at the door of a rich feudal landlord. He is brought up in the family as Vetrivel alias Vel and becomes the darling of everybody including Appatha, the family head. Meanwhile, the other twin grows up and becomes a private detective Vasudevan alias Vasu, who falls in love with a television hostess, Swathi. At the same time, Vel is given a tough time by Sakkara Pandi, a former minister and local strongman who has his own axe to grind. Vasu is filled with smiles and happiness, while Vel lives with sickles and rage in his battle against Sakkara Pandi.

Vel encounters Vasu while in Madras, and Vasu learns about Vel through Swathi, who spotted Vel while in his village doing a television broadcast. Vasu goes to Vel's village believing he was his long-lost brother. While Vasu was in a bus, Sakkara Pandi planted bombs in the nearby canal believing Vel was in the bus, fortunately, Vasu escapes by jumping out the bus before the bus went past the canal. Vasu is saved by Vel's family who tried to hide him violently inside a car while Vel returned home. They blow their cover when Vasu angrily kicks Vel's uncles outside of the car windshield, enraging Vel to almost slice Vasu's neck until he realizes that Vasu is his look-alike. Vasu and Vel meet and the truth about Vel being adopted is revealed and Appatha breaks down. Vel gets mad and states that despite this, Appatha and her family is his family and tells Vasu to leave. Vasu asks Vel to come to Madras and see his actual parents, which Vel refuses. Vasu asks to stay for a few days, but Vel refuses him again. Feeling sympathetic for Vasu, Appatha permits him to stay at Vel's house for a few days, despite an enraged Vel vehemently disagreeing. During his time, Vasu becomes close with the family and sees how much they love Vel. He realizes that sending Vel to Chennai will be very tough on everyone due to their immense love for him. Vasu befriends Kuzhandaisami, who was the son of Muthupandi, who was Vel's foster father's younger brother. He learns from Kuzhandaisami who Sakkara Pandi is and why he is an enemy to the family.

15 years ago, after Vel's grandfather Velupandi died, Vel's father Rajapandi was the head of the house and he got rid of Sakkara Pandi's factories and put him to jail for 3 years, Sakkara Pandi after released from jail, poisoned Rajapandi and his wife Sivagami foods and killed them without evidence while they were travelling back home. Ever since then the family eats only Appatha's homemade foods.

After Vasu leaves with a heavy heart and promising to not talk about Vel to his parents, he and Vel get into an argument which ended up with them swapping roles. Vasu offers to help Vel in defeating Sakkara Pandi while Vel goes as Vasu to Chennai for 10 days in order to meet his actual parents for the first time, with only Kuzhandaisami knowing the truth. Swathi's and Vasu's close friend Moorthy were informed of Vel coming instead of Vasu and help Vel maintain his cover as Vasu and show him around. Vasu uses non-conflict tactics to stop Sakkara Pandi and his factories which succeeds, but Appatha is poisoned by Sakkara Pandi. Kuzhandaisami calls Vel from the village and informs him this, but the family overhears and Vasu's true identity is revealed and he is disgraced and kicked out.

An enraged Sakkara Pandi, realizing he has been tricked, openly challenges Vasu and plants bombs all over the village and threatens to murder Vel's family. Vel and Vasu teams up and stop the bombs from blasting, and Vel's uncles apologize to Vasu for their earlier behaviour to him, upon realizing his good heart. Vel fights and chases Sakkara Pandi and during the chase, his leg gets caught on the railway. But he had a bomb with him and explained he would do one last killing by killing the civilians on the train. Fortunately, Vel tricks him, cuts off his leg and pushes him down where the bombs explodes, killing Sakkara Pandi. Vasu's parents, had gone to Appatha and pleaded for them to give Vel to them, Appatha sadly agrees. But when Vel comes, she started crying and a few kids were begging Vel not to leave. Vasu pleads with his mother to let Vel stay here and sacrifice her son, shocking everyone. Sharadha cries, but she agrees saying "after all these years, I just hoped I can know he's alive, but instead I met him and talked with him, that is more than enough".

The movie ends on a happy note with Vasu and Vel embracing and the family worshipping the God.

== Cast ==
- Suriya in a dual role as:
  - T.Vetrivel
  - T. Vasudevan
- Kalabhavan Mani as Sakkara Pandi, the main antagonist
- Asin as Swathi, Vasu's love interest
- Vadivelu as Kuzhandaisamy, Vel's sidekick
- Charan Raj as Thiyagarajan, Vel's and Vasu's father
- Nassar as Raja Pandi, Vel's adopted father
- Lakshmi as Arivumangai, Vel's adopted grandmother
- Saranya Ponvannan as Sharadha, Vel's and Vasu's mother
- Ambika as Sivagami, Vel's adopted mother
- Raj Kapoor as Muthu Pandi, Raja Pandi's 1st younger brother
- O. A. K. Sundar as Veera Pandi, Raja Pandi's 2nd younger brother
- Ilavarasan as Durai Pandi, Raja Pandi's youngest brother
- Aishwarya as Manimeghalai, Sakkara Pandi's wife
- Charle as Moorthy, Vasu's friend
- Devadarshini as Sarala, Swathi's elder sister
- Chaams as Gopal, Swathi's brother-in-law
- Vaiyapuri as Mokkasami, Sakkara Pandi's sidekick
- Singamuthu as Shamugam, Sakkara Pandi's accountant
- Crane Manohar as Ayyakannu, Kuzhandhaisami's sidekick
- Madhan Bob as Lawyer Sundaram
- Imman Annachi as Karadimuthu
- Halwa Vasu as Arivu
- Bava Lakshmanan as Murugan, Sakkara Pandi's sidekick
- Kripa as Shanthi
- Uma Padmanabhan as Vel's and Vasu's relative
- Sujatha Sivakumar as Vel's aunt
- Krishnamoorthy as Roadside stall owner
- Chelladurai as a villager
- Sanjeev Karthick as Raja Pandi's relative
- Vijay Ganesh as a villager
- Meesai Rajendranath as a rowdy

== Production ==
Asin was selected as lead heroine of Suriya after the success of Ghajini. The songs were shot in Switzerland, Kutralam, and Kerala (Munnar and Vagamon).

== Soundtrack ==
Director Hari once again teamed up with composer Yuvan Shankar Raja for the musical score of Vel after having worked together in Thaamirabharani. The soundtrack of Vel was released on 13 October 2007 and features 6 songs. Lyrics were written by Na. Muthukumar and Hari. Comedian Vadivelu had lent his voice for one of the songs.

The album received mixed reviews.

Vel

Soundtrack album by Yuvan Shankar Raja
- Released: 13 October 2007 (India)
- Recorded: 2007
- Genre: Feature film soundtrack
- Labels: Sony Music India; Think Music; Ayngaran Music; An Ak Audio; AVM Muzik
- Producer: Yuvan Shankar Raja

Yuvan Shankar Raja chronology
Kattradhu Thamizh (2007)	Vel (2007)	Machakaaran (2007)

Song	Singers	Length (m:ss)	Lyrics
"Indha Ooril"	Shankar Mahadevan	4:30	Na. Muthukumar
"Kovakkara Kiliye"	Sujatha and Tippu	4:15	Na. Muthukumar
"Aayiram Jannal"	Rahul Nambiar, Premji Amaran, Malaysia Vasudevan and Vadivelu	5:13	Na. Muthukumar
"Thoppul Kodi"	Sriram Parthasarathy	2:11	Hari
"Onnapola"	Shankar Mahadevan and Srilekha Parthasarathy	4:03	Na. Muthukumar
"Ottraikannale"	Haricharan and Suchitra	4:08	Hari

Song	Singers	Length (m:ss)	Lyrics
"Palakonda Kona Lona"	Shankar Mahadevan	4:30	Na. Muthukumar
"Kurra Kurra Chiluka"	Sujatha and Tippu	4:15	Na. Muthukumar
"Devudu Malichina Illu"	Rahul Nambiar, Premji Amaran, Malaysia Vasudevan	5:13	Na. Muthukumar
"Peguthenchukunna"	Sriram Parthasarathy	2:11	Hari
"Kondapalli Nimmakaya"	Shankar Mahadevan and Srilekha Parthasarathy	4:03	Na. Muthukumar
"Orakannultho"	Haricharan and Suchitra	4:08	Hari

Source: https://open.spotify.com/album/7uH2KC1So3CZSJQ4lkD21b https://pendujatt.com.se/album/deva-yuvan-shankar-raja

== Release ==
The film released on 8 November 2007 coinciding with Diwali along with Azhagiya Tamil Magan. The film was dubbed in Telugu as Deva(Which Shalimar Movies acquired the rights).

== Critical reception ==
Sify rated 3 out of 5 stars stating "Above Average". Rediff rated 2.5 out of 5 stars stating "The saving graces of Vel include the fact that it is slick, neat, moves at a brisk pace to keep everyone interested, displays no cleavage and has very little blood and gore in spite of the violent storyline". Kalki praised the star cast, cinematography, humour, while praising director Hari for narrating old plot gently, delicately with fast-paced screenplay. Malini Mannath of Chennai Online wrote "What works for the film is that it doesn't take itself very seriously, nor does it expect the audience to. It's an unpretentious, clean family entertainer, that keeps one engaged for a couple of hours and more. An ideal time-pass fare".
