= Rakshit (surname) =

- Language: Bengali

Origin
- Origin: Bengali Hindu
- Region of origin: Bengal

Rakshit (Bengali: রক্ষিত) is a native Bengali surname that is mainly used by the Bengali Maulika Kayastha and Baidya castes of Bengal. It is also found among some others Bengali castes such as Baishya Kapali, Barujibi, Tanti, Tambulibanik, Teli and Tili.

== Notable people with the surname ==
- Haimanti Rakshit Das, Bangladeshi singer
- Mihir Rakshit, Indian economist
- Reba Rakshit, Indian bodybuilder
- Tushar Rakshit, Indian footballer
- Utsav Rakshit, Singaporean cricketer
