= Pokkiri =

2007 Indian Tamil film by Prabhu Deva

- Theatrical release poster
- Directed by: Prabhu Deva
- Written by: Puri Jagannadh; V. Prabhakar (dialogues)
- Story by: Puri Jagannadh
- Based on: Pokiri (Telugu) by Puri Jagannadh
- Produced by: S. Rameshbabu
- Starring: Vijay; Asin; Prakash Raj; Napolen; Nassar; Vadivelu
- Cinematography: Nirav Shah
- Edited by: Kola Bhaskar
- Music by: Mani Sharma
- Production company: Kanagarathna Movies
- Distributed by: Aascar Films
- Release date: 12 January 2007
- Running time: 160 minutes
- Country: India
- Language: Tamil

Pokkiri (transl. Rogue) is a 2007 Indian Tamil-language action film directed by Prabhu Deva. A remake of the 2006 Telugu film Pokiri directed by Puri Jagannadh, the film stars Vijay in the lead role alongside Asin, Prakash Raj, Napolean, Nassar, Mukesh Tiwari, Vadivelu, Sriman, Anandaraj, Vincent Asokan, Subbaraju and Master Bharath. The film is about Tamizh, a ruthless, fearless hit man in the Chennai underworld. He swiftly joins the mafia with the dislike of other members in the gang. He and an aerobic teacher, Shruthi, fall in love with each other, but Shruthi is repulsed by his violent life.

The film was officially announced in July 2006, in addition to the official title. Principal photography commenced the same month. It was predominantly shot in Chennai and wrapped by late-November. The film has music composed by Mani Sharma, cinematography handled by Nirav Shah and editing by Kola Bhaskar.

Pokkiri was released theatrically on 12 January 2007 and received positive reviews with praise for Vijay's performance, action sequences and music. It became a huge commercial success, running for more than 200 days at the Tamil Nadu box office. Six years later, it was dubbed in Hindi as Wanted Baaghi and was also dubbed in Odia as Wanted Police, as well as Malayalam under the same title as the Tamil version. Vijay's Pokkiri was re-released multiple times in Kerala. A re-mastered version in 4K was re-released worldwide in theatres on 21 June 2024.

== Plot ==
The city of Chennai is rife with the nefarious activities of land mafia. There are two rival gangs: one under Ali Bhai, who resides in Dubai and controls the India operations through his skilled henchmen Guru and Korattur Logu, as well as his girlfriend Mona; and another operated by a local goon named Narasimhan. They threaten builders and landowners into giving them protection money or property through force, extortion, or murder. Mohammed Mohideen Khan takes charge as the new Police Commissioner of Chennai and starts cracking down on crime.

Tamizh, a thug in the city, is chased by Logu and his henchmen, as he took a contract from Narasimhan to beat up Logu, which he does. Seeing Tamizh's potential, Guru and Mona invite Tamizh to join their gang, which he accepts, and states that he does not work for any gang but is ready to do anything for money. Meanwhile, Tamizh falls in love with Shruthi, an aerobics teacher, when he visits his best friend Saravana's dad's aerobics class, but she mistakes him for a pervert. Shruthi lives with her widowed mother, Lakshmi, and younger brother, Pappu. Body Soda, a bogus kung fu master and Shruthi's landlord, lives above her house and frequently, albeit comically and unsuccessfully, tries to convince her to marry him. Govindan, a corrupt inspector in Shruthi's colony who is on Ali Bhai's payroll, lusts for Shruthi and decides to make her his mistress, undeterred by her multiple rejections.

Tamizh's first assignment with Ali Bhai's gang is to kill a member of Narasimman's gang. However, the commissioner and his team show up at the spot where Tamizh and the other gangsters are waiting. Tamizh engages the cops long enough for the others to finish the task and flee. He also helps Shruthi escape from Govindan. When Body Soda tips Govindan about Tamizh's romance with Shruthi, he confronts Tamizh, who threatens to expose Govindan's involvement in the death of a constable, and proclaims that Shruthi is his lover. Impressed by his kindness, and a friendship soon blossoms between the two, leading to the development of unspoken romantic feelings for each other. When Shruthi tries to express her feelings to Tamizh, they are attacked by members of Narasimhan's gang, whom Tamizh finishes off in the presence of Shruthi. Shruthi is shocked to learn that Tamizh is a cold-blooded gangster with no qualms about killing people. Govindan arranges for some thugs to stage a mock sexual assault on Shruthi so that no suitor will approach her for marriage. Tamizh learns of this and thrashes Govindan incognito, warning him of the consequences if he finds him responsible. Soon, Guru is found dead, presumably killed by Narasimhan in retaliation against the deaths of his gang members at the hands of Tamizh earlier, forcing Ali Bhai to come to Chennai from Dubai and kill Narasimhan and his gang. He also meets Tamizh to discuss the killing of a minister by blowing up a school. Tamizh disagrees with Ali Bhai's method as it would involve killing women and children, which goes against his principles.

In the middle of their argument, Mohideen and his team raid the club and arrest Ali Bhai. His gang members retaliate by kidnapping Mohideen's daughter, drugging her, and create a lewd video of her and blackmail Mohideen, forcing him to release Ali Bhai. Meanwhile, when the goons who assaulted Shruthi confront her and Pappu on the local suburban train, Tamizh arrives and kills the goons; despite shocked by his ruthlessness, Shruthi confesses her love to Tamizh. In her drugged state, Mohideen's daughter reveals that her father had placed an undercover police officer as a mole in Ali Bhai's gang. Ali Bhai learns that his name is Satyamoorthy, the son of retired police inspector Shanmugavel. Ali Bhai meets Shanmugavel and kills his adopted son Saravana, believing he is Satyamoorthy and is irated when he finds out it's not him. Shanmugavel then reveals that Satyamoorthy has gone undercover to eliminate the criminal underworld in Chennai by posing himself as a criminal, and that he killed Guru; Ali Bhai then kills Shanmugavel to lure the real Satyamoorthy. When Satyamoorthy actually turns up, everyone, especially Shruthi and Govindan, is shocked upon seeing that he is none other than Tamizh. After Shanmugavel's and Saravana's funerals, Satyamoorthy forces Govindan to call Ali Bhai to learn his hideout. Govindan secures a deal with Ali Bhai to kill Satyamoorthy, but fails on every occasion; Satyamoorthy eliminates Ali Bhai's gang members one by one, rescuing Mohideen's daughter in the process. In the end, Satyamoorthy thrashes and kills Ali Bhai by slashing his throat with a broken glass window. He calls the commissioner, telling that his daughter is safe and Ali Bhai is no more, and that Govindan was killed in the ensuing melee. Startled upon hearing this, Govindan tries to kill him, but is killed by Satyamoorthy, who finally says "Oru Vaati Mudivu Panitta, Yen Pecha Naane Kekka Maaten" (transl. Once I have made a decision, I won't listen to my own voice).

== Cast ==
- Vijay as ACP S.Sathyamoorthy IPS / Tamizh, Shanmugavel's biological son and an undercover police officer.
- Asin as Shruthi
- Napoleon as Commissioner Mohammed Mohideen Khan IPS
- Prakash Raj as Ali Bhai, an international mafia don
- Mukesh Tiwari as Inspector Govindan, corrupt police officer who supports Ali Bhai
- Vadivelu as Master Body Soda
- Nassar as Shanmugavel, Tamizh's biological father and retired police officer
- Sriman as Saravana, Shanmugavel's adopted son and Tamizh's best friend
- Anandaraj as Narasimhan
- Vincent Asokan as Guru
- Subbaraju as Korattur Logu
- Master Bharath as Pappu, Shruthi's brother
- Sriranjani as Lakshmi, Shruthi's widowed mother
- Ajay Rathnam as ACP Rathnavel IPS
- Brinda Parekh as Mona, Ali Bhai's girlfriend
- G. V. Sudhakar Naidu as Das
- Dhamu as Juice Shop Owner
- Vaiyapuri as Mani, Tamizh's friend
- Karate Raja as Raja, Tamizh's friend
- Pandu as Elevator Operator
- King Kong as a lorry driver
- Scissor Manohar as Colony Member
- Besant Ravi as Ali Bhai's henchman
- Soundhar as Veluchamy
- Sampath Ram as Narasimman's henchman
- Japan Kumar as Kannayiram
- G. K. as Vishwanath
- Bobby as Thamba
- Kullamani as Body Soda's sidekick
- Thambi Ramaiah as Body Soda's sidekick and friend
- Krishnamoorthy as Body Soda's sidekick
- Mumaith Khan (special appearance in the song "En Chella Peru Apple")
- Sridhar (special appearance in the song "En Chella Peru Apple")
- Ashok Raja (special appearance in the song "Aadungada Yennai Suththi")
- Prabhu Deva (director and special appearance in the song "Aadungada Yennai Suththi")

== Production ==
After the failure of Aathi in January 2006, for nearly six months Vijay was listening to stories, but none had appealed; he was supposed to remake Dharani's Bangaram (2006), until its failure made him look for other options. Being a childhood friend of Mahesh Babu from his Madras days, Vijay watched the actor's Telugu film Pokiri (2006) and felt it would also work in Tamil. After some reported difficulty in finding the right director for adapting it in Tamil, Prabhu Deva was selected. Asin was selected, pairing with Vijay for the second time after Sivakasi (2005). The first day of shoot for the film was held on 6 July 2006 at the new Ganesha temple at AVM Studios.

== Music ==
The soundtrack has 8 songs composed by Mani Sharma. The audio rights were acquired by Five Star Audio and Ayngaran.Three of the songs from the original Telugu version "Dole Dole", "Ippatikinka", and "Jagadame" were retained and remade in Tamil as "Dole Dole Than", "En Chella Peru Apple", and "Yuthame (Theme)", respectively. The soundtrack also features a remix of the song "Vasantha Mullai" from Sarangadhara (1958).

Song	Artist(s)	Length	Lyrics
"Dole Dole Than"	Ranjith, Suchitra	4:43	Pa. Vijay
"Aadungada Yennai Suththi"	Naveen	4:29	Kabilan
"Nee Mutham Ondru"	Ranjith, Swetha Mohan	4:52	Pa. Vijay
"Mambazhamam Mambazham"	Shankar Mahadevan, Ganga Sitharasu	4:41	Snehan
"En Chella Peru Apple"	A. V. Ramanan, Suchitra	4:35	Pa. Vijay
"Vasantha Mullai"	Rahul Nambiar, Krishnamoorthy	4:19	Na. Muthukumar
"Nee Mutham Ondru" (Remix)	Ranjith, Shweta Mohan	4:12	Pa. Vijay
"Yuthame (Theme)"	Mani Sharma	2:36	

== Release ==
=== Theatrical ===
The film was released on 12 January 2007 at the festival of Pongal weekend, alongside Aalwar and Thaamirabharani. Th.

In 2019, the film also had a limited re-release on the occasion of Vijay's 45th birthday.

== Reception ==
=== Box office ===
The film was commercial success and ran for over 200 days in Tamil Nadu. The film completed a 50-day run in 50 centres and a 100-day run in 10 centres. The film completed a 175-day run in 3 centres, and a 200-day run at one theatre. The film ran for 100 days in one centre at Kerala. It was the third-highest grossing Tamil film at that time in Kerala after Anniyan (2005).

=== Critical response ===
The Hindu wrote, "After watching the Telugu Pokkiri, one wondered how it could be rehashed to suit Vijay. Well, kudos to Prabhu Deva for doing a fine job of the remake". Sify said that the film was "enjoyable while it lasts". Rediff.com gave the movie two stars, stating "there's nothing more tedious than a badly made remake." Ananda Vikatan rated the film 42 out of 100. Malini Mannath of Chennai Online wrote "'Pokkiri' is not much different from the earlier gangster films. And if it manages to hold interest to a point, it's mainly due to the Vijay-factor and it's [sic] racy narrative style." Lajjavathi of Kalki wrote Prabhu Deva has scored a six in the first film, and his screenplay is elegant and stunning, leading to the last scene and loved the way he moved the film by keeping suspense here and there.

=== Accolades ===
Award	Category	Recipient	Result	Ref
Vijay Awards	Favourite Film	Singanamala Ramesh	Won	
Vijay Awards	Favourite Director	Prabhu Deva	Won	
Vijay Awards	Entertainer of the Year	Vijay	Won	
Vijay Awards	Favourite Hero	Vijay	Nominated	
Vijay Awards	Favourite Heroine	Asin	Nominated	
Vijay Awards	Best Actress	Asin	Nominated	
Vijay Awards	Best Villain	Prakash Raj	Nominated	
Vijay Awards	Best Choreographer	Dinesh ("Vasantha Mullai")	Won	
Vijay Awards	Best Stunt Director	Fefsi Vijaan	Nominated	
Filmfare Awards South	Best Actor	Vijay	Nominated	
Filmfare Awards South	Best Actress	Asin	Nominated	
Ananda Vikatan Cinema Awards	Best Comedian – Male	Vadivelu	Won	

== In popular culture ==
Some of the quotes from the film that became popular were: "Vada Poche", "Plan Panni Pannanum" spoken by Vadivelu and Vijay's dialogue "Oru Vaati Mudivu Panta, Yen Pecha Naane Kekka Maaten" (transl. Once I have made a decision, I won't listen to my own voice) became popular and was repeated multiple times in his 2022 film Beast. One of Vadivelu's dialogue "Vada Poche" inspired a comedy show in Sun Music with same name. The dialogue also inspired a song sung by Velmurugan and Powerstar Srinivasan in Arya Surya (2013). Other dialogue of Vadivelu, "Plan Panni Pannanum" (transl. Make a plan and execute it) also inspired a film of the same name.

The intro fight scene was shown in the Malayalam film Daddy Cool (2009). The scenes from the film were parodied in Tamizh Padam as hero being an undercover cop. The song "Pokkiri Pongal" is mentioned during the song "Adada" in Pokkiri Simon (2017), where Asin's jogging scene is also parodied. Vijay's dialogue before entry fight "Nee adicha piece naan adicha mass"(transl. Your hit would tear me into piece but mine would be a mass hit) is referenced in the Shylock (2020) Malayalam movie during Mammootty's second entry fight. Nelson acknowledged Pokkiri as an inspiration for his directorial Beast (2022). Pokkiri was also parodied in the Star Vijay comedy series Lollu Sabha, in an episode named Bakery.
