= London Dreams =

2009 Indian film by Vipul Shah

- Theatrical release poster
- Directed by: Vipul Shah
- Screenplay by: Suresh Nair
- Story by: Suresh Nair; Ritesh Shah
- Produced by: Vipul Shah
- Starring: Salman Khan; Ajay Devgn; Asin; Aditya Roy Kapur; Rannvijay Singh; Om Puri
- Cinematography: Sejal Shah
- Edited by: Amitabh Shukla
- Music by: Songs: Shankar-Ehsaan-Loy; Background Score: Salim–Sulaiman
- Distributed by: Blockbuster Movie Entertainers; Headstart Films; Intech
- Release date: 30 October 2009
- Running time: 153 minutes
- Country: India
- Language: Hindi
- Budget: ₹45 crore
- Box office: ₹41.31 crore

London Dreams is a 2009 Indian Hindi-language musical drama film directed and produced by Vipul Amrutlal Shah. The film stars Salman Khan, Ajay Devgn, and Asin in lead roles.The film had a worldwide release on 30 October 2009 and was a commercial failure. It marks the second collaboration between Devgn and Khan after Hum Dil De Chuke Sanam (1999).

== Plot ==
The story revolves around two childhood friends, Arjun Joshi and Mannjeet "Mannu"Khosla. When Arjun was 17 years old, he was more focused on becoming a singer, but his father disagreed; therefore, he began praying for his death so he could go to London. The only one who consoled him was his 15-year-old friend Mannu. After Arjun's father dies, he finally travels to London with his uncle, whom he later runs away from after arriving.

Arjun, now 35 years old, creates a fledgling band with Zoheb and Wasim, two brothers who duped their relatives in Pakistan to travel to London in pursuit of their musical aspirations. He also brings aboard Priya Zaveri, a music enthusiast from a conservative South Indian family. Back in India, Mannu seduces married women and finds himself in debt with the locals.

After paying his debt, Mannu goes to London to join Arjun's band, but becomes more popular with the crowds, whilst also flirting with Priya. The band embarks on a three-city tour spanning Paris, Rome, and Amsterdam, where Arjun deceives a naive Mannu into a rollercoaster ride of promiscuous sex and illicit drugs. He tricks him, gets him addicted to drugs, and then gets him arrested in a car full of them. While pretending to help Mannu, Arjun leaks the drug story to the press. As the three-city tour concludes, the band heads to London to perform at Wembley Stadium in front of an audience estimated at 90,000 (which is of significance since, earlier in the movie, the viewer is told that Arjun's grandfather had failed before a similarly huge audience).

Knowing how important this is for Arjun, Mannu tries to give up drugs. But Arjun decides that his success and Mannu's total failure are related. He pays a girl to pretend to have oral sex with Mannu, which makes Priya break up with Mannu. In this fragile state, Zoheb pushes Mannu toward drugs again, and his mental state is now so fragile that he can't face appearing on stage. In the moments leading up to the stage entrance, Mannu comes to senses and chooses the righteous path and runs to support his mate.

But Arjun, who has become incensed with the crowd chanting Mannu's name, confesses his envy of Mannu's talent and what he did to finish Mannu off. The audience boos Arjun, the show ends in chaos, the band breaks up, and a sad Mannu eventually returns to his village. Arjun's uncle advises him to apologize to Mannu. Then it is revealed that after knowing the truth, Priya and Mannu reconcile. Also, she marries Mannu and lives with him in his village. In the village, however, Mannu tells him not to apologize, saying that it was his fault that he didn't see Arjun's sorrow, and Priya also pardons Arjun for his wrong deeds. They get back together, and London Dreams becomes a successful band again.

== Cast ==
- Salman Khan as Manjeet "Mannu" Khosla
- Ajay Devgn as Arjun Joshi
- Asin as Priya Zaveri
- Om Puri as Kanjeshwar Joshi, Arjun's uncle
- Aditya Roy Kapur as Wasim Khan, Zoheb's brother
- Rannvijay Singh as Zoheb Khan, Wasim's brother
- Ajay Kalyansingh as Office Worker

== Production ==
In 2000, Rajkumar Santoshi planned a film titled Rashque. The film was reportedly set to star Aamir Khan, Shah Rukh Khan, and Aishwarya Rai. However, the project never materialised. Years later, the film was remade as London Dreams, with a new cast.

== Reception ==
=== Critical response ===
London Dreams received mixed to negative reviews from critics. Taran Adarsh praised the performance of the principal cast, while criticizing the climax. Rajeev Masand gave a scathing review of the movie, describing it as a "frustratingly foolish film about foolish people." Chandrima Pal of Rediff criticized the background music of the movie, while praising the dialogues, as well as Ajay Devgan's performance. Noyon Jyoti Parasara of AOL said "The last twenty minutes of ‘London Dreams’ take away half its spirit."

== Soundtrack ==
Music was composed by Shankar–Ehsaan–Loy with lyrics written by Prasoon Joshi. The song style is generally rock inspired to match the motifs in the movie. "Khanabadosh", "Shola Shola", "Barso Yaaron", "Khwab" and "Man Ko Ati Bhavey Saiyaan" were very popular songs; "Man Ko Ati Bhavey" and "Khanabadosh" being the most popular ones.
