= Dasavathaaram =

2008 film directed by K. S. Ravikumar

- Theatrical release poster
- Directed by: K. S. Ravikumar
- Written by: Kamal Haasan
- Produced by: V. Ravichandran
- Starring: Kamal Haasan
- Cinematography: Ravi Varman
- Edited by: K. Thanigachalam; Ashmith Kunder
- Music by: Songs: Himesh Reshammiya; Score: Devi Sri Prasad
- Production company: Aascar Film Private Limited
- Distributed by: Ascar Film Private Limited
- Release date: 13 June 2008
- Running time: 185 minutes
- Country: India
- Language: Tamil
- Box office: ₹200 crore

Dasavathaaram (transl. The 10 Avatars) is a 2008 Indian Tamil-language epic action thriller film directed by K. S. Ravikumar, written by Kamal Haasan and produced by V. Ravichandran under Aascar Film Pvt. Ltd. The film stars Haasan playing 10 distinct roles with Asin playing dual roles (Note: This film is the penultimate appearance of Asin in Tamil cinema), alongside an ensemble cast of Jaya Prada, Mallika Sherawat, K. R. Vijaya, Rekha Harris, Nagesh, P. Vasu, Raghuram, Napoleon and M. S. Bhaskar. In the film, a biotechnology scientist named Govind is forced to steal a vial containing a deadly bioweapon from his corrupt boss, who intended to sell it to terrorists, and keep it contained. A series of events ensue in which Govind is hunted by an American mercenary named Christian Fletcher and a Telugu police officer named Balram Naidu. Several other people also get involved in Govind's journey and all their stories connect after the striking of 2004 Indian Ocean earthquake and tsunami, thus bringing philosophical views into the picture. The film incorporates numerous themes and philosophies, such as Theism, Vaishnavism, existence of God, determinism, casteism, chaos theory and the butterfly effect.

The film, which had been under production for nearly three years, was distributed by V. Ravichandran. Primary filming locations included the United States and across Tamil Nadu in India. The songs were composed by Himesh Reshammiya, while the background score was composed by Devi Sri Prasad. The cinematography and editing were handled by Ravi Varman and K. Thanigachalam respectively.

After delays in post-production, Dasavathaaram was released on 13 June 2008 in around 1300 theatres worldwide and received positive reviews from critics. Though its Hindi version was an average success, the film was a massive success at the box-office. Dasavathaaram is the first South Indian and Tamil movie with worldwide box-office gross surpassing ₹200 crores. It also became the highest-grossing Tamil film of all time until it was surpassed by Enthiran (2010).

== Plot ==
A prologue, set in the 12th century, shows Rangarajan Nambi, a devout Vaishnavite, resisting King Kulothunga II's efforts to desecrate a Vishnu idol. Nambi is executed, and both him and the idol drown in water. This event sets a thematic backdrop for the story.

Nearly 900 years later in 2004, Govindarajan Ramaswamy, an Indian scientist in the U.S., is working on a synthetic virus intended to be used as a bioweapon. When a lab monkey dies after ingesting the virus, Govind realizes the threat it poses. After discovering that his superior, Dr. Sethu, plans to sell the virus to terrorists, Govind flees with the vial. During a scuffle, the vial is mistakenly shipped to India. Christian Fletcher, a mercenary ex-CIA agent hired to retrieve the vial, kills several people in pursuit, including Govind's friend Suresh and his wife Yuka. Govind follows the package to Chidambaram, where it ends up with an elderly woman, Krishnaveni, who unknowingly hides it inside a Vishnu idol. Govind's attempts to retrieve it are complicated by Fletcher's pursuit, the local police, and Krishnaveni's devout granddaughter, Andal, who believes that Govind is trying to steal the idol.

Multiple subplots unfold: Fletcher's translator-wife and partner-in-crime, Jasmine, is killed during a skirmish involving a rogue elephant; Yuka's brother Shingen, a Japanese martial artist, arrives to avenge Yuka's death; and Telugu RAW officer Balram Naidu investigates Govind's activities. Along the way, Govind and Andal encounter various characters, including social activist Vincent Poovaraghan and a Muslim family headed by the towering Khalifulla. The vial is accidentally switched with a medicine cooler belonging to singer Avtaar Singh, who is being treated for throat cancer. Eventually, Fletcher takes hostages, demanding the virus in exchange. After a series of chases and confrontations—including one at Avtaar's concert—the vial ends up back in the idol.

Govind attempts to neutralize the virus by immersing it in the ocean after finding out that sodium chloride weakens it. A fight breaks out at a construction site between Govind and Fletcher, with Shingen intervening. Fletcher swallows the virus but succumbs to a massive tsunami, which hits the coast. The natural disaster wipes out the threat, killing Fletcher and causing widespread destruction. Govind, Andal, and others survive. Poovaraghan dies by drowning inside, and Krishnaveni mistake his corpse, as of her deceased son. Andal believes the tsunami was a divine intervention, but Govind maintains a rationalist view, questioning the morality of such devastation as a means of salvation. They then profess their love for each other. Govind is honored for his efforts with an event that is attended by world leaders, and a final glimpse shows the remains of Nambi and his idol washing ashore.

== Cast ==
Kamal Haasan's ten different characters in the movie. He had to wear excessive prosthetic makeup to portray all of them except Rangarajan Nambi and Govind.

- Kamal Haasan in ten roles as:
  1. Rangarajan Nambi, a 12th-century Vaishnavite priest who tries to prevent the destruction of the statue of Vishnu and got killed by Chola Emperor Kulothunga II; the ancestor of Govind (based on Matsya Avatar)
  2. Govindarajan "Govind" Ramaswamy, a Tamil American bio-scientist who discovers the bioweapon and whose sole mission is to protect it. (based on Kalki Avatar)
  3. Balram Naidu, a Telugu high-ranking RAW officer, who initially labels Govind as a terrorist and later pursues Fletcher to retrieve the vial. (based on Balarama Avatar)
  4. Avtaar Singh, a Punjabi pop singer, who suffers from throat cancer. (based on Rama Avatar)
  5. Shingen Narahashi, a Japanese martial artist who wants to take revenge on Fletcher for killing his sister Yuka and protects Govind from Fletcher. (based on Narasimha Avatar)
  6. Christian Fletcher, an American ex-CIA agent and mercenary, who wants possession of the vial for bioterrorism. (based on Parasurama Avatar)
  7. George W. Bush, the 43rd President of the United States. (based on Koorma Avatar)
  8. Krishnaveni, an insane centenarian woman in Chidambaram, who is Andal's great-grandmother (based on Varaha Avatar)
  9. Vincent Poovaraghan, a Kanyakumari born dalit social activist, who is against a politically-backed sand mafia. (based on Krishna Avatar)
  10. Khalifullah Khan Mukhtar, a Tamil Muslim tailor with gigantism, who helps Govind and Andal. (based on Vamana Avatar)
- Asin in dual roles as
  - Kodhai Radha, Nambi's wife
  - Andal, Govind's fiancee and Krishnaveni's great granddaughter
- Jaya Prada as Ranjita Kaur, Avathar Singh's wife
- Mallika Sherawat as Jasmine, a skilled assassin who marries Fletcher to become his translator
- Rekha as Meenakshi, Ragavendra's wife
- K. R. Vijaya as Begum, Mukhtaar's wife and Khalifullah's mother
- Napoleon as Kulothunga Chola II
- Raghuram as Appa Rao, Balram's assistant
- Nagesh as Sheikh Mukhtaar, Khalifullah's father
- Chakri Toleti as Sairam, Govind's friend
- Shammu as Assistant Biotechnologist Suresh
- Akash as Inspector Bharath
- Ramesh Kanna as Doctor Pradeep
- Raj Toleti as Dr. Setu, Govind's chief doctor
- M. S. Bhaskar as Broadway Kumar, Fletcher's assistant in India
- P. Vasu as J. Ragavendra
- Santhana Bharathi as Sundaram, Ragavendra's brother-in-law
- R. Sundarrajan as MLA Jeevan
- Kabilan as Kabilan, Vincent Boovaraghan's supporter
- Chitti Babu as Ekambaram, Balram's aide
- Vaiyapuri as Prabhu, courier man
- Kesava Chandra as Young Lord Krishna in the song "Mukundha Mukundha" (uncredited)
- J. Jayalalithaa (archive footage)
- K. S. Ravikumar special appearance in the song "Ulaga Nayagane"
- Ravivarman special appearance in the song "Ulaga Nayagane"

== Production ==
=== Pre-production ===
Kamal Haasan came up with an original storyline and approached a number of directors, including Gautham Vasudev Menon to direct it, when K. S. Ravikumar accepted the offer. It began soon after the announcement of Sivaji: The Boss starring Rajinikanth. Ravikumar and Kamal Haasan came together for the fourth time following their three previous successful ventures, Avvai Shanmughi, Thenali and Panchatanthiram.

=== Development ===
V. Ravichandran signed up to produce the venture securing distribution rights in the process. Pyramid Film Fund had an exposure of 50 percent in the project.

Following nearly a year of pre-production, deciding the cast and the locations, the film began its first schedule on 11 September 2006.

=== Casting ===
Vidya Balan was originally considered to play the lead actress before Asin was finalised. Actors Jayaram and Vadivelu opted out of the film during the production of the project, citing scheduling issues.

=== Filming ===
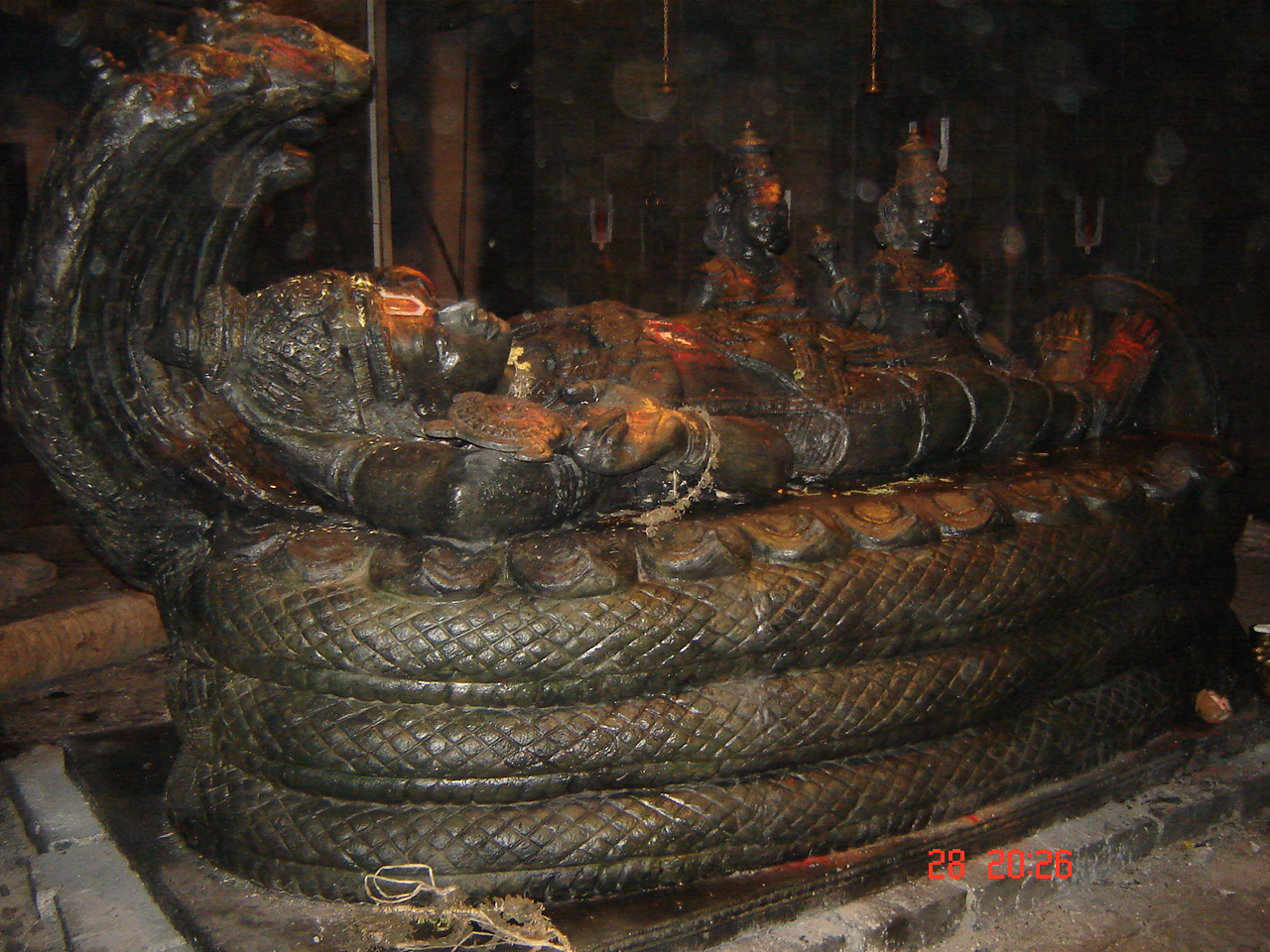
Picture of the film set depicting the Vishnu idol used in the film. The idol, made out of black stone and smeared with kumkuma and sandalwood paste, depicts Vishnu lying on his 7-headed serpent Shesha, attended by Vishnu's consorts Sridevi and Bhudevi at right.

A preliminary process took place before the start of filming, which featured make-up tests that lasted for 25 days in the USA. The make-up used for Kamal's characters proved to create difficulties. It took nine hours to implement the make-up and it failed to stay for a long period of time. To compensate for that, he had to rest and take fluids using a straw and at the same time, refrain from moving his facial muscles to ensure that his prosthetic makeup was not disturbed.

Major portions of the films were shot extensively in overseas locations which included the US, Tokyo, Malaysia and Thailand. Filming was nearly complete by early October 2007; the film's final shoot occurred on 8 October 2007 at Uthandi, a coastal village.

== Soundtrack ==
Dasavathaaram

Soundtrack album by Himesh Reshammiya
- Released: 25 April 2008
- Recorded: 2007–2008
- Genre: Feature film soundtrack
- Length: 31:58
- Language: Tamil
- Label: Sony Music India
- Producer: V. Ravichandran

Himesh Reshammiya chronology
My Name Is Anthony Gonsalves (2008)	Dasavathaaram (2008)	Karzzzz (2008)

The film was originally announced with A. R. Rahman as the music director of the film. However he opted out of the project owing to scheduling conflicts. Kamal, who quickly wanted the tunes, roped in Himesh Reshammiya, for whom Dasavathaaram became his Tamil film debut and only Tamil film to date. The background score was composed by Devi Sri Prasad. As the film demanded a "stylish and western" quality of music, two reels of music were initially composed and tested. A two-and-a-half-minute theme song was later composed for the promos. The background music in the second half consisted of extensive usage of violins and chorus and the entire score for the film was recorded over a period of one month, in Chennai.

The soundtrack was released on 25 April 2008 at the Jawaharlal Nehru Stadium in Chennai, which became the largest audio launch for a South Indian film. Prominent film personalities across the world attended the event, with Jackie Chan, in his first such appearance, being Hollywood's ambassador for the function. Other prominent regional Indian artistes such as Amitabh Bachchan, Mammootty, Vijay and Madhavan attended the launch. The then-Chief Minister of Tamil Nadu, M. Karunanidhi, attended the event. The event saw overcrowding and the Chennai Police employed lathi charge on the streets to regain control. The rights to the soundtrack album were acquired by Sony BMG for a price ₹20 million (US$210,000), making it their first purchase of a Tamil film soundtrack

Rediff gave 2 out of 5 stars and concluded that the album was "a mediocre listening experience."

Tamil tracklist
No.	Title	Lyrics	Singer(s)	Length
1.	"Ulaga Nayagan"	Vairamuthu	Vinit Singh	5:34
2.	"Oh...Ho...Sanam"	Vairamuthu	Kamal Haasan, Mahalakshmi Iyer	5:31
3.	"Kallaimattum Kandal"	Vaalee	Hariharan & Chorus	5:28
4.	"Mukundha Mukundha"	Vaalee	Sadhana Sargam, Kamal Haasan	6:32
5.	"Kaa...Karuppanukkum"	Vairamuthu	Shalini Singh	5:06
6.	"Oh...Ho...Sanam (Re-Mix)"	Vairamuthu	Himesh Reshammiya, Mahalakshmi Iyer	3:47
Total length:				31:58

All lyrics are written by Sameer.

Hindi tracklist
No.	Title	Singer(s)	Length
1.	"Om Namo Narayan"	Hariharan & Chorus	5:28
2.	"Koi Tumsa"	Vinit Singh	5:34
3.	"Oh Sanam Ho Sanam"	Shaan, Mahalakshmi Iyer	5:31
4.	"Mukundha Mukundha"	Sadhana Sargam, Kamal Haasan	6:32
5.	"Hey Black Ho Ya White"	Shalini Singh	5:06
6.	"Oh Sanam Ho Sanam (Re-Mix)"	Shaan, Mahalakshmi Iyer	3:47

== Release ==
=== Theatrical ===
The film was delayed multiple times; it was initially scheduled for release in 2007, which was later pushed to Pongal 2008. However, in February 2008, V. Ravichandran announced that, due to extensive post-production works, Dasavaatharam would be released worldwide on the eve of the Tamil New Year weekend. The film was delayed again later due to the success of inaugural Indian Premier League season. For that reason, and to avoid conflicts with Suriya's Vaaranam Aayiram scheduled for a May 2008 release, the release of the film was put on hold till 1 June 2008, the date when the tournament concluded. In late May 2008, the makers announced that the film would release on 13 June 2008 in Tamil along with a version dubbed in Telugu. However, the release of the Hindi dub was postponed to 27 June 2008. The film was shown subsequently to the Chief Minister of Tamil Nadu, M. Karunanidhi, at the request of the producer on 8 June 2008.

=== Distribution ===
Sony Pictures India distributed the film in Hindi, whilst Ayngaran International sold the film to cinema halls in the United Kingdom, Singapore and the Gulf. Canadian rights for the film were bought by Walt Disney Studios Motion Pictures through their Buena Vista International label, becoming the first distributional venture of an Indian film by the production house. The film released worldwide in 1,300 theatres, with 275 in Tamil Nadu, 80 in Karnataka, 410 altogether for the Hindi version, 260 altogether for the Telugu version (25 of which were in Hyderabad alone), 85 in Kerala, and 190 overseas.

=== Marketing ===
The film's theatrical trailer was released publicly on 23 April 2008, a day after it was shown to special guests. The first exclusive screening of the film, prior to release, was held on the morning of the audio launch on 25 April 2008, to visiting guests Jackie Chan, Amitabh Bachchan, Mammootty and Vijay, all of whom praised the film.

=== Legal issues ===
Assistant director Senthil Kumar filed a case against the film at the Madras High Court. He claimed to have created the story of Dasavathaaram, in a script titled, Ardhanari alias Clones, and that Kamal Haasan and V. Ravichandran had "stolen" the script and left him out of the credits, violating the copyright act. On the basis of this complaint, the Chennai police inquired with the actor and later accepted his explanation; the Madras High Court then sent notices to Kamal Haasan and the producer V. Ravichandran announcing an interim stay on the release of the film. The film was allowed to continue with its production and post-production, but the case was delayed till in 2007. However, in September 2007, the Court dismissed the petition of Senthil Kumar in the case, clearing the legal hurdles for the film.

Following the audio launch on 25 April 2008, Mallika Sherawat received a police complaint against the donning of improper attire at a film function. Hindu Makkal Katchi, a splinter group of the Hindu Munnani, lodged a complaint with the police, saying that Sherawat's attire at the function to release audio-CDs of Dasavathaaram, in which Tamil Nadu Chief Minister M. Karunanidhi had been present, had "hurt the sentiments of Hindus". The actress was accused of wearing a mini-skirt and exposing her back in front of the chief minister. The petition was dismissed on 29 May 2008, with the Madras High Court stating that Dasavathaaram did not portray Hindu culture negatively.

== Reception ==
=== Box office ===
==== India ====
Dasavathaaram completed a 100-day run on 20 September 2008 in four screens in Chennai. The Chennai Corporation had given the producer special permission to hold five shows daily, which helped the film to garner the extraordinary opening. In the second weekend too, the film registered at least 95% at multiplexes and 80% in single screens. The film grossed ₹96 lakh (equivalent to ₹2.9 crore or US$310,000 in 2026) from 17 screens in Chennai in the opening weekend. The film grossed ₹21 crore (equivalent to ₹64 crore or US$6.8 million in 2026) all over Tamil Nadu on its first weekend. It grossed ₹60 lakh (equivalent to ₹1.8 crore or US$190,000 in 2026) outside South India in the three-day weekend. The film grossed ₹91 lakh (equivalent to ₹2.8 crore or US$300,000 in 2026) in a fortnight in Mayajaal multiplex. In Sathyam Cinemas multiplex, the film grossed ₹90 lakh (equivalent to ₹2.7 crore or US$290,000 in 2026) in a fortnight. The film stayed at No.1 position in Chennai box office for five consecutive weeks.

The Hindi version Dashavtar, that was released after almost one year opened to a 5–10% response. Dashavtar grossed ₹1.93 crore (equivalent to ₹5.9 crore or US$630,000 in 2026) in six weeks and was declared as an average success. The Malayalam version of the film grossed ₹2 crore (equivalent to ₹6.1 crore or US$650,000 in 2026) in Kerala in the first week.

==== Other territories ====
Dasavathaaram grossed $4,632,719 and was ranked number 7 in its opening week, becoming the first Tamil film to reach the Top 10 at the international box office. In Malaysia, the film opened in second place, having collected $601,000 from 58 screens on the opening weekend and $1,720,780 in nine weeks.

The film grossed ₹200 crore (US$45.97 million) worldwide, and is currently one of the highest-grossing Tamil films of all time.

=== Critical response ===
Some critics felt that the plot of Dasavathaaram was little bit confusing and that Kamal Haasan's ten roles were forced, with only four or five relevant to the plot.

Rediff praised the film as "spectacular" and a "superhuman effort", rating it with 4 out of 5 stars. The reviewer concluded that the film will "go down in the history of Indian cinema as a unique experiment in the commercial circuit". Sify called the film "average", stating that it would "fall short of the huge expectation and hype it had generated." The reviewer also criticised the make-up, lamenting that "Kamal's prosthetic makeup, especially as George Bush, Fletcher and Khan, is a bit of a dampener" but claimed that Brian Jennings's special effects, "mainly of the climax Tsunami scene, are a top-class by Indian standards". The reviewer praised cinematographer Ravi Varman, noting: "[He] may take a bow, as his camerawork is glossy and superb", but noted that some of Haasan's characters like Avatar Singh and Khalifullah Khan were "unnecessarily stitched together to make it a perfect 10."

T S Sudhir of NDTV wrote, "Dasavathaaram, unfortunately, remains just a film with its USP of 10 Kamals. This Kamal does not blossom the way he did in Indian or Nayakan, Appu Raja, Mahanadi, Avvai Shanmughi or in Thevar Magan" and further stated, "One of the best in the business falters with the film's story and screenplay." Nikhat Kazmi of The Times of India rated the film 2.5 out of 5 and said, "EXPERIMENTS aren't always successful. Like Dasavatharam, Kamal Haasan's ambitious venture sees him playing ten roles which include a take on George Bush too. Daring, we'd like to insist; only the make-up and the fake appearance borders more on the comic." The Deccan Herald said, "The ten roles are awfully disparate: they are more like pantomime characters. Kamal appears too flabby and jaded. Sorry, Appu Raja (or shall we say Michael, Madana, Kamarajan) it's time you start being your age. From start to finish there is a severe decibel assault aided and abetted by Himesh Reshammiya."

Malathi Rangarajan of The Hindu said, "The film would have worked even better had the narrative been tauter and more purposive [post-intermission]" but concluded, "All in all, Dasavathaaram shows that Kamal Haasan has once again taken great pains to make his cinematic projects convincing. The effort has paid off." Ananda Vikatan rated the film 43 out of 100.

=== Accolades ===
List of awards and nominations
Award	Date of ceremony (Note: Date is linked to the article about the awards held that year, wherever possible.)	Category	Nominee(s)	Result	Ref.
Tamil Nadu State Film Awards	28 September 2009	Best Film Award	V. Ravichandran	Won	
Tamil Nadu State Film Awards	28 September 2009	Best Actor Award	Kamal Haasan	Won	
Tamil Nadu State Film Awards	28 September 2009	Best Lyricist Award	Vaali	Won	
Tamil Nadu State Film Awards	28 September 2009	Best Make-up Artist Award	Michael Westmore, Kothandapani	Won	
Vijay Awards	13 June 2009	Best Comedian	Kamal Haasan	Won	
Vijay Awards	13 June 2009	Best Villain	Kamal Haasan	Won	
Vijay Awards	13 June 2009	Best Story, Screenplay Writer	Kamal Haasan	Won	
Vijay Awards	13 June 2009	Vijay Award for Favourite Hero	Kamal Haasan	Won	
Vijay Awards	13 June 2009	Best Costume Designer	Gautami	Won	
Vijay Awards	13 June 2009	Best Art Director	Samir Chanda, M. Prabhaharan, Thota Tharani	Won	
Vijay Awards	13 June 2009	Best Actor	Kamal Haasan	Nominated	
Vijay Awards	13 June 2009	Best Actress	Asin	Nominated	
Vijay Awards	13 June 2009	Best Cinematographer	Ravi Varman	Nominated	
Vijay Awards	13 June 2009	Best Lyricist	Vaali	Nominated	
Vijay Awards	13 June 2009	Best Stunt Director	Thyagarajan, Kanal Kannan, Joop Katana	Nominated	
Vijay Awards	13 June 2009	Best Make Up Artistes	Michael Westmore	Nominated	
Vijay Awards	13 June 2009	Vijay Award for Favourite Film	Aascar Films Pvt. Ltd.	Nominated	
Vijay Awards	13 June 2009	Vijay Award for Favourite Director	K. S. Ravikumar	Nominated	
Vijay Awards	13 June 2009	Vijay Award for Favourite Song	Himesh Reshammiya - 'Kallai Mattum' from Dasavathaaram	Nominated	
V. Shantaram Awards	January 2009	Best Sound Award	H. Sridhar	Won	
V. Shantaram Awards	January 2009	Best Actor	Kamal Haasan	Nominated	

== Cancelled spin-off ==
A spin off film Sabaash Naidu, based the character Balram Naidu, was planned but eventually dropped due to financial issues.

== Bibliography ==
- Dhananjayan, G. (2011). The Best of Tamil Cinema, 1931 to 2010: 1977–2010. Galatta Media. ISBN 978-81-921043-0-0.
