= Kalpana Raghavendar =

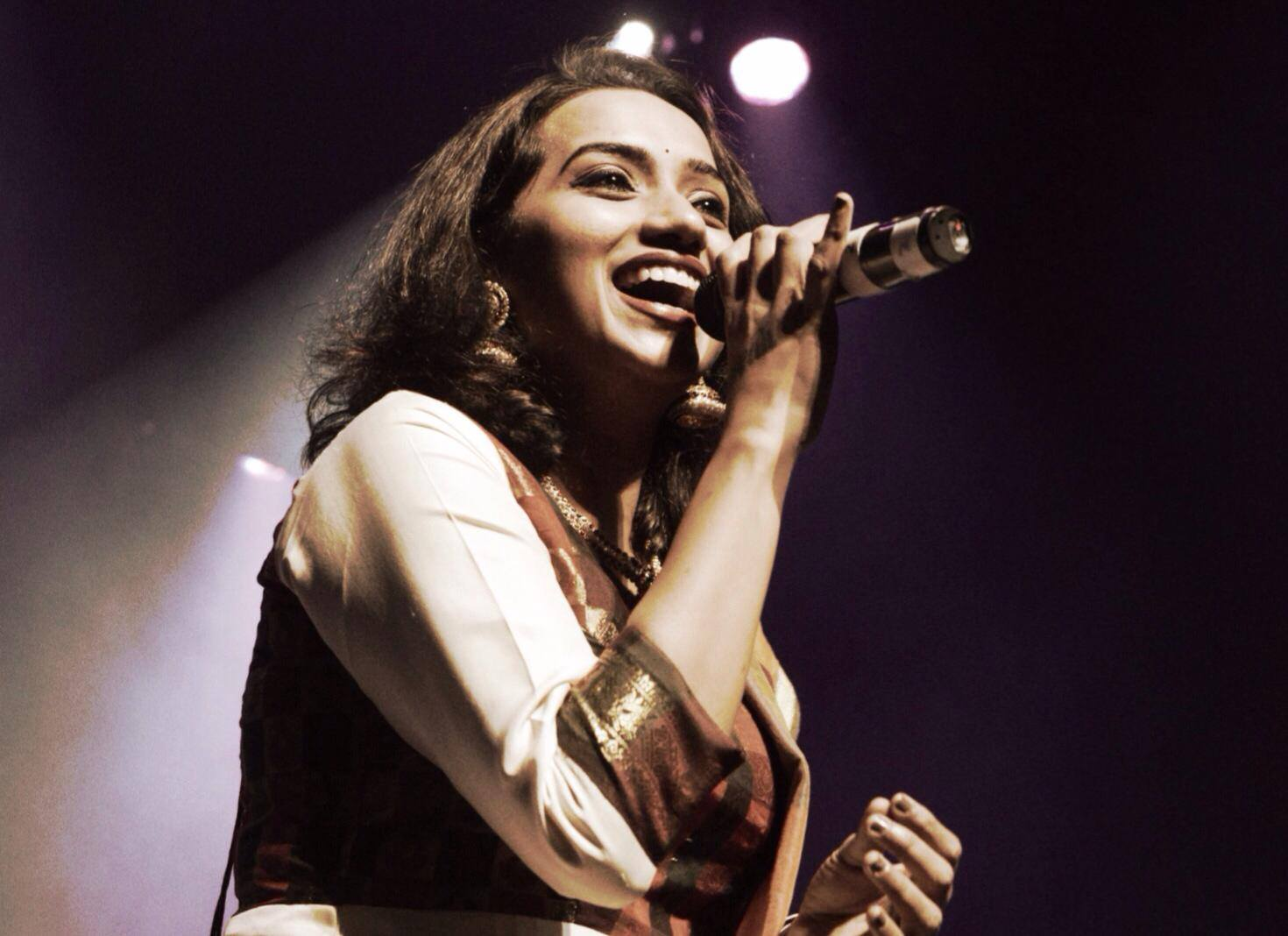

Background information
- Born: 8 May 1980 (age 46); Chennai, Tamil Nadu, India
- Genres: Playback singing, Carnatic music
- Occupation: Singer
- Website: Kalpana Raghavendar on Facebook

Kalpana Raghavendar (born 8 May 1980) is an Indian playback singer, winner of Idea Star Singer Malayalam and participant in Bigg Boss Telugu Season 1, songwriter and actor. She started her career as a playback singer at the age of five and, by 2013, had recorded 1,500 tracks and performed in 3,000 shows in India and abroad.

In 2010, she was the winner of the south Indian singing show Star Singer season 5, broadcast by the Malayalam TV channel Asianet. She is a judge of Super Singer Junior.

== Early life and background ==
Kalpana Raghavendar was born into a Tamil musical family. Her father, T. S. Raghavendra, was a renowned playback singer, actor and composer, and her mother, Sulochana, is also a singer. She has a younger sister, Shekinah Shawn (born Prasanna Raghavendar) who is an opera singer. Kalpana Raghavendar took her Carnatic music lessons under Madurai T. Srinivasan. She has a Master of Computer Applications degree and is pursuing a Master of Philosophy.

== Career ==
Kalpana Raghavendar began her musical career at the age of five. She acted in the film Punnagai Mannan aged six. Her first vocals were for a family song with P. Susheela, Mano, M. M. Srilekha and her younger sister Prasanna, composed by the music director Saluri Vasurao. As an adult, she started her career as a full-fledged playback singer in 1999 with the song "Mangalagouriki" from the Telugu film Manoharam under the music director Mani Sharma. She has worked with many legendary composers and singers like M. S. Viswanathan, Ilaiyaraaja, A. R. Rahman, K. V. Mahadevan, S. P. Balasubrahmanyam and K. S. Chithra. She is more familiar to the public as a stage performer rather than a playback singer, having performed nearly 3,000 stage shows worldwide. In 2013, she was the lead performer in a tribute concert for her guru, Madurai T. Srinivasan.

== Filmography ==
=== Television ===
| Year | Title | Channel | Language | Notes |
|---|---|---|---|---|
| 2010 | Star Singer Season 5 | Asianet | Malayalam | Star Singer Season 5 winner |
| 2017 | Bigg Boss Telugu (season 1) | Star Maa | Telugu | 11th place- evicted on day 28 |
| 2018 | Super Singer Junior season 6 | Star Vijay | Tamil | Judge |
| 2019 | Super Singer TV season 1 | Star Maa | Telugu | Judge |
| 2020 | Super Singer Junior season 7 | Star Vijay | Tamil | Judge |
| 2020 | Saregamapa champions | Zee Telugu | Telugu | Judge |
| 2021 | Airtel Super Singer season 8 | Star Vijay | Tamil | Judge |
| 2021 | Super Singer Junior season 8 | Star Vijay | Tamil | Judge |
| 2022 | Star Singer season 8 | Asianet | Malayalam | Judge |
| 2024 | Super Singer 10 | Star Vijay | Tamil | Guest |

=== As actor ===
| Year | Film | Role | Language | Notes |
|---|---|---|---|---|
| 1984 | Vaidehi Kathirunthal | | Tamil | |
| 1986 | Punnagai Mannan | Little girl in store | Tamil | |

== Discography ==
List of songs recorded by Kalpana Raghavendar

| Year | Song title | Film name | Language | Co-artist(s) |
|---|---|---|---|---|
| 1991 | "Poda Poda Punnaku" | En Rasavin Manasile | Tamil | |
| 1992 | "Eyru Mayil Eyri" | Thambi Pondatti | Tamil | |
| 1995 | "Thennati Singam" | Pasumpon | Tamil | |
| 1997 | "Meenachi Kayil" | Vidukathai | Tamil | |
| 1999 | "Thirupachi Arivaala" | Taj Mahal | Tamil | |
| 2000 | "Manasuna Pongina" | Sparsha | Telugu | |
| 2000 | "Alaipongera" | Sakhi | Telugu | |
| 2000 | "En Manathai" | Pottu Amman | Tamil | |
| 2000 | "Saregama" | Vamshi | Telugu | |
| 2000 | "Mangala Gouri" | Manoharam | Telugu | |
| 2001 | "Mandela Mandela " | Narasimma | Tamil | |
| 2001 | "Mayabini Ratir Bukut" | Daag | Assamese | Zubeen Garg |
| 2001 | "Lala Nanthala" | Narasimma | Tamil | |
| 2001 | "Premante Suluvu Kadhura" | Kushi | Telugu | |
| 2001 | "Monalissa" | Anandam | Telugu | |
| 2001 | "Alai Kadalil" | Pappa | Tamil | |
| 2001 | "Gunthalakadi" | Cheppalani undhi | Telugu | |
| 2001 | "Arasanda Raman" | Murari | Tamil | |
| 2002 | "Musugu veyyodhu" | Khadgam | Telugu | |
| 2002 | "Lokam" | Bobby | Telugu | |
| 2002 | "Ammadu Appachi" | Indra | Telugu | |
| 2002 | "Hey mama" | Takkari Donga | Telugu | |
| 2002 | "Aleba Aleba" | Takkari Donga | Telugu | |
| 2002 | "Cheliya cheliya singaram" | Kalusukovalani | Telugu | |
| 2002 | "Orinayano" | Thotti Gang | Telugu | |
| 2002 | "Rendu" | Coolie | Telugu | |
| 2002 | "Ku Ku Ku" | Kouravudu | Telugu | |
| 2002 | "Oh Pilla" | Joruga Husharuga | Telugu | |
| 2003 | "Rangareddy Zilla" | Ayudham | Telugu | |
| 2003 | "Iylasa Kattumaram" | Arasu | Tamil | |
| 2003 | "Anbae Inithu" | Hollywood | Tamil | |
| 2003 | "Penne Neeyum" | Priyamana Thozhi | Tamil | |
| 2003 | "Kadalora Kavithai" | Student Number 1 | Tamil | |
| 2003 | "Kadhal Thozhi Kadhal Thozhi" | Student Number 1 | Tamil | |
| 2003 | "En Idhayam (Febi)" | Dhanush | Tamil | |
| 2003 | "Naan Putham Puthu" | Inidhu Inidhu Kadhal Inidhu | Tamil | |
| 2003 | "Jee Boumbha" | Alaudin | Tamil | |
| 2003 | "Vaanam Enaku" | Ice | Tamil | |
| 2003 | "Appappa" | Ice | Tamil | |
| 2003 | "Dondapandu lanti" | Pellam Oorelithe | Telugu | |
| 2003 | "Sarigamapadanesa" | Raghavendra | Telugu | |
| 2003 | "Nammina Namadhi" | Raghavendra | Telugu | |
| 2003 | "Thillana" | Ee Abbai Chala Manchodu | Telugu | |
| 2003 | "Prapanchame" | Abhimanyu | Telugu | |
| 2003 | "O malle Puvvura" | Pellam Oorelithe | Telugu | |
| 2003 | "Seetharamula kalyanam" | Evare Atagaadu | Telugu | |
| 2003 | "Vana Vana" | Evare Atagaadu | Telugu | |
| 2003 | "Nee left kannu" | Abbayi Premalo Paddadu | Telugu | |
| 2003 | "Abba em body" | Abbayi Premalo Paddadu | Telugu | |
| 2003 | "Gundammo" | Palnati Brahmanayudu | Telugu | |
| 2003 | "Brindavanamlo" | Palnati Brahmanayudu | Telugu | |
| 2003 | "Preminchu kunna vaalu" | Kalyana Ramudu | Telugu | |
| 2004 | "Abho ni amma" | Anji | Telugu | |
| 2004 | "Chiku Buku Pori" | Anji | Telugu | |
| 2004 | "Indurudu" | Mass | Telugu | |
| 2004 | "Radhu kadha" | Sakhiya Naatho Raa | Telugu | |
| 2004 | "Chakkaranti" | Sakhiya Naatho Raa | Telugu | |
| 2004 | "Joole Joole" | Varsham | Telugu | |
| 2004 | "Ye Jilla" | Shankar Dada M.B.B.S. | Telugu | |
| 2004 | "Sande Poddu" | Shankar Dada M.B.B.S. | Telugu | |
| 2004 | "Gongoora" | Venky | Telugu | |
| 2004 | "Azhaku Neeya" | Jai | Tamil | |
| 2004 | "Alek Alek" | Jai | Tamil | |
| 2004 | "Oru Chinna Vennila" | Gambeeram | Tamil | |
| 2004 | "Aggipulla Geeyagane" | Okato Number Kurraadu | Telugu | |
| 2004 | "Ithuvarai Yarum" | Kadhaludan | Tamil | |
| 2004 | "Kadal Kadal" | Aalukkoru Aasai | Tamil | |
| 2004 | "Bhel Poori Nan" | Aalukkoru Aasai | Tamil | |
| 2004 | "Asale Chalikalam" | Mr & Mrs Sailaja Krishnamurthy | Telugu | |
| 2004 | "Veena Vani" | Pon Megalai | Tamil | |
| 2004 | "Thathai Thathai" | Manmadhan | Telugu | |
| 2004 | "Chemma Chekka" | Chanti-The hero | Telugu | |
| 2004 | "Sri Anjaneyam Slokam" | Sri Anjaneyam | Telugu | |
| 2005 | "Kandi Chenu Kada" | Naa Alludu | Telugu | |
| 2005 | "Pilla Chusthe" | Naa Alludu | Telugu | |
| 2005 | "Istanbul Rajakumari" | Mazhai | Tamil | |
| 2005 | "Kadavul Thanda" | Maayavi | Tamil | |
| 2005 | "Devaloga Rani" | Maayavi | Tamil | |
| 2005 | "Nenjam Ennum" | Aaru | Tamil | |
| 2005 | "Koncham Koncham" | Thirudiya Idhayathai | Tamil | |
| 2005 | "Adhire Adhire" | Nuvvostanante Nenoddantana | Telugu | |
| 2005 | "Agadalu Pagadalu" | Radha Gopalam | Telugu | |
| 2005 | "Eh Oore Chinnadana" | Bhadra | Telugu | |
| 2005 | "Ammama Nee Misam" | Andarivaadu | Telugu | |
| 2005 | "Doli Doli" | Sankranthi | Telugu | |
| 2005 | "Nee Varumbodhu" | Mazhai | Tamil | |
| 2005 | "Nagamani" | That Is Pandu | Telugu | |
| 2005 | "Ela Radamma" | Koneti Rayuni Koti Ratnalu | Telugu | |
| 2005 | "Vishnu Vishnuvani" | Koneti Rayuni Koti Ratnalu | Telugu | |
| 2005 | "Tirumala Sikhranan" | Koneti Rayuni Koti Ratnalu | Telugu | |
| 2005 | "Kathadi Pole" | Maayavi | Tamil | |
| 2005 | "Mallela Maimarupey" | Andari kosam | Telugu | |
| 2005 | "Chelivadanam" | 786 Khaidi Premakatha | Telugu | |
| 2005 | "Vadi Vedi" | Satti | Telugu | |
| 2005 | "Chiru Chiru Chudaraa" | Hangama | Telugu | |
| 2005 | "Adagandha Andaalu" | Ayodhya | Telugu | |
| 2006 | "Getup Marchesa" | Andala Ramudu | Telugu | |
| 2006 | "Silusilukkum Silmisham" | Chennai Kadhal | Tamil | |
| 2006 | "Kala Kala Kalai" | E | Tamil | |
| 2006 | "Thothapuram" | Varalaru | Tamil | |
| 2006 | "Madura Jilla" | Thiruvilaiyaadal Aarambam | Tamil | |
| 2006 | "Neeve Na Sarvam" | Swapnam | Telugu | |
| 2006 | "Naa Dhyanam" | Swapnam | Telugu | |
| 2006 | "Pranamati" | Prem | Telugu | |
| 2006 | "Utee Tippu" | Hanumanthu | Telugu | |
| 2006 | "Kalayo Vyshnava Mayo" | Evandoy srivaru | Telugu | |
| 2006 | "Krishnaveni Krishnaveni" | Ghana | Telugu | |
| 2007 | "Mancham Vesy" | Seema Sastri | Telugu | |
| 2007 | "Na Coffee" | Lakshyam | Telugu | |
| 2007 | "Manmatha" | Viyyalavari Kayyalu | Telugu | |
| 2007 | "O Apparoa" | Yamagola Malli Modalayindi | Telugu | |
| 2007 | "Adukodaniki" | Yamagola Malli Modalayindi | Telugu | |
| 2007 | "Jalakthik Raja" | Yamagola | Telugu | |
| 2007 | "Okkasari" | Gundamma Gaari Manavadu | Telugu | |
| 2007 | "Manasantha Edo" | Venkatadri | Telugu | |
| 2007 | "Sexy Haseena" | Venkatadri | Telugu | |
| 2007 | "Hey Handsome" | Viyyalavari Kayyalu | Telugu | |
| 2008 | "Ninne pelladukoni" | Ready | Telugu | |
| 2008 | "Cheppalanundi" | Ontari | Telugu | |
| 2008 | "Sudha Badhakam" | Somberi | Telugu | |
| 2008 | "Thanuvu kore" | Kalyanam | Telugu | |
| 2008 | "Intinta" | Kuberulu | Telugu | |
| 2008 | "Thodai Nuvvu Undalamma" | Devarakonda Veeraiah | Telugu | |
| 2008 | "Nanna Nanna" | Indrajit | Telugu | |
| 2008 | "Maaya Maayaga" | Bommana Brothers Chandana Sisters | Telugu | |
| 2009 | "Premante Adho Iidhi" | Adhineta | Telugu | |
| 2009 | "Boomi Kothikum" | Arundhathee | Tamil | |
| 2009 | "Sandhanakkuyiley Unakkaaga" | Thozhi | Tamil | |
| 2009 | "Ammamo Pilode" | Adugu | Telugu | |
| 2009 | "Yaraadi Nee Mohini" | Eesaa | Tamil | |
| 2009 | "Sayyare Sayya" | Drona | Telugu | |
| 2010 | "O Nene O Nuvvani" | Kalavaramaye Madilo | Telugu | |
| 2010 | "Ada Engengum Aasai" | Kola Kolaya Mundhirika | Tamil | |
| 2010 | "Jingu Chikk" | Mynaa | Tamil | |
| 2010 | "Pada Pada" | Bheemili Kabaddi Jattu | Telugu | |
| 2010 | "Manasu Manasutho" | Adhi nuvve | Telugu | |
| 2011 | "Acham" | Kullanari Koottam | Tamil | |
| 2011 | "Ooru Usilampatti" | Keezha Theru Kicha | Tamil | |
| 2011 | "Aaroora Aariraaro" | Sirai Pozludhugal | Tamil | |
| 2012 | "Adire andhalu" | Nandeeswarudu | Telugu | |
| 2012 | "Kozhutha Koyya" | Kollaikaran | Tamil | |
| 2012 | "Kozhutha Koyya (SolarSai)" | Kollaikaran | Tamil | |
| 2013 | "Navamoorthulainatti" | Intinta Annamayya | Telugu | |
| 2013 | "Nila Nila" | Nirnayam | Tamil | |
| 2013 | "Santhiran Sooruyan" | Muthu Nagaram | Tamil | |
| 2013 | "Vijay Pola" | Sandhithathum Sindhithathum | Tamil | |
| 2013 | "Kaali Kaali" | Meiyyazhagi | Tamil | |
| 2013 | "Chandare chanda" | Shiva kesav | Telugu | |
| 2013 | "Jam Jam Jam" | Maad Dad | Malayalam | |
| 2013 | "Muddada Nagaye" | Galaate | Kannada | |
| 2014 | "Dikkulu chudaku" | Dikkulu Choodaku Ramayya | Telugu | |
| 2014 | "Undile" | Undile Manchi Kalam Mundu Mundhuna | Telugu | |
| 2014 | "Prasanna" | Dhee Ante Dhee | Telugu | |
| 2015 | "Gundello" | Andhra Pori | Telugu | |
| 2015 | "Pogiren" | 36 Vayadhinile | Tamil | |
| 2016 | "Yappa Chappa" | Kanithan | Tamil | |
| 2016 | "Jiguru Jiguru" | Rajini Murugan | Tamil | |
| 2016 | "Kaara Karuuna" | Mapla Singam | Tamil | |
| 2016 | "Adho Theme" | Manithan | Tamil | |
| 2016 | "Oyaa Oyaa" | Kaashmora | Tamil | |
| 2022 | "Veezehendhen" | Regina | Tamil | |
| 2023 | "Kodi Parakura Kaalam" | Maamannan | Tamil | |
| 2024 | "Telangana Tejam" | Keshava Chandra Ramavath | Telugu | |

== Awards ==
- Won – Nandi Award for Best Playback Singer Female for the song "Navamoorthulainatti" from Intinta Annamayya (2018)
- Won – Tamil Nadu State Film Award for Best Female Playback Singer for the song Pogiren from 36 Vayadhinile(2015)
