= Ramalakshmi Cine Creations =

Indian film production company

- Industry: Entertainment
- Founded: Hyderabad in 2005
- Founder: Sridhar Lagadapati; Sirisha Lagadapati
- Headquarters: Hyderabad, India
- Area served: India
- Key people: Sridhar Lagadapati; Sirisha Lagadapati
- Products: Films
- Services: Film production
- Owner: Sridhar Lagadapati
- Parent: Larsco

Ramalakshmi Cine Creations is an Indian film production company established by Sridhar Lagadapati in 2005. The following article lists films produced by Sridhar Lagadapati under Larsco Entertainment, later under the banner of Ramalakshmi Cine Creations (owned by Larsco Entertainment). Today, Larsco Entertainment is named Sirisuns Entertainment, which is still owned by Sridhar Lagadapati and Sirisha Lagadapati.

== Film production ==
No	Year	Film	Language	Actors	Director	Notes
1	2005	Evadi Gola Vadidhi	Telugu	Aryan Rajesh	E. V. V. Satyanarayana	
2	2006	Style	Telugu	Raghava Lawrence, Prabhu Deva	Raghava Lawrence	
3	2007	Viyyalavari Kayyalu	Telugu	Uday Kiran	E. Satti babu	
4	2010	Sneha Geetham	Telugu	Sandeep Kishan, Venky Atluri, Chaitanya Krishna	Madhura Sreedhar Reddy	
5	2013	Potugadu	Telugu	Manoj Manchu	Pavan Wadeyar	
6	2015	Krishnamma Kalipindi Iddarini	Telugu	Sudheer Babu, Nanditha Raj	R. Chandru	
7	2018	Naa Peru Surya	Telugu	Allu Arjun, Anu Emmanuel	Vakkantham Vamsi	

Dubbed films

No	Year	Film	Language	Actors	Director	Notes
7	2014	Sikandar	Telugu	Surya, Samantha Akkineni	N. Lingusamy	Dubbed from Tamil movie Anjaan, Co-produced with Thiruppati Brothers and UTV Motion Pictures
11	2019	Evadu Thakkuva Kaadu	Telugu	Vikram Sahidev, Priyanka Jain	Raghu Jaya	Dubbed from Kannada movie Golisoda 2016, which was in turn a remake of the Tamil original Goli Soda (2014).
