= Dongaata =

Dongaata may refer to:

- Dongaata (1997 film), directed by Kodi Ramakrishna starring Jagapati Babu and Soundarya
- Dongaata (2015 film), directed by Vamsi Krishna starring Lakshmi Manchu and Adivi Sesh
