= Raageshwari Loomba =

Indian singer and actress (born 1977)

Raageshwari
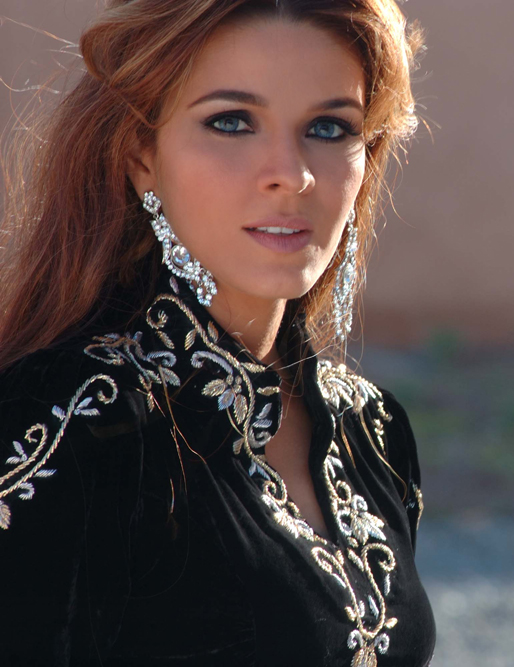
- Raageshwari in 2006
- Born: Raageshwari Loomba; 25 July 1977 (age 49); Bombay, Maharashtra, India
- Other names: Paashu; Raaga; Rags
- Education: Auxilium Convent High School; Loyola College, Madras (dropped out)
- Occupations: Singer; Actress; Model; Writer; Television Presenter; VJ; mindfulness speaker
- Years active: 1993–present
- Works: Discography; Filmography; Bibliography
- Spouse: Sudhanshu Swaroop (m. 2014)
- Children: 1
- Parent(s): Trilok Singh Loomba (father); Veera Singh Loomba (mother)
- Awards: See below
- Musical career
- Genres: Indian pop, Sufi, Spiritual
- Instruments: Vocals; guitar; keyboard; piano
- Labels: Bertelsmann Music Group; Magnasound; Saregama; Venus
- Website: Official website

Raageshwari Loomba (born 25 July 1977), professionally known as Raageshwari, is an Indian singer, actress, model, writer, video jockey, television personality, and mindfulness speaker.

== Early life ==
Raageshwari was born on 25 July 1977 in Bombay, India. She attended the Auxilium Convent High School.

== Career ==
As a teenager, Raageshwari begin her singing career with her first film Oonch Neech Beech in 1989. She also begin her acting career with her first film Zid in 1991, for which she had officially signed; however, the project faced delays, preventing it from being her first film to reach theatres. The first film to be released was the 1993 film Aankhen, featuring Govinda, Ritu Shivpuri and Chunky Panday, during which she signed for her second film and was the highest-grossing Indian film of that year. Her second film Zid, originally intended to be her debut, was ultimately released in January 1994. Following this, she appeared in her third film Main Khiladi Tu Anari (1994), her fourth film Dil Aa Gaya (1995) and her fifth film Tum Jiyo Hazaron Saal, in which she was supposed to release in late 1996, but it was delayed until 2002.

Her sixth film release was Dil Kitna Nadan Hai (1997), in which she took a break from acting to join MTV as a VJ. Later, her debut album Duniya was released on 17 March 1997 under Bertelsmann Music Group and debuted at no. 1.

Raageshwari signed a deal with Coca-Cola to do a series of concerts all over India.

In late 1999, Raageshwari and her father collaborated on another album, Y2K Saal Do Hazaar. Raageshwari was suffering from malaria, while shooting for the video "Ikki chikki chikita." The album was released with a concert on the eve of the year 2000. Just a week after the concert, Raageshwari was diagnosed with Bell's palsy, which left her with a paralysed left side of the face and a slur in her voice. Over the next year, she rehabilitated herself with help of physiotherapy, electrical stimulation and yoga. She did television shows such as Ek Do Teen, Baar Baar Dekho and Most Wanted on MTV, and was one of her founding MTV VJ members. Her other television shows such as Kuch Kehti Hai Yeh Dhun on Sony, Quest for BBC and One on One With Raageshwari on TEN Sports.

Raageshwari made her debut as an author where she released her first book Building a Happy Family under Penguin Random House. Initially, it released in May 2020 as an E-Book format, it was later made available in January 2021 in a physical hardcover format.

== Personal life ==
In 2012, Raageshwari moved to London where she met highly acclaimed Public International lawyer, Sudhanshu Swaroop KC. They married on 27 January 2014, in Mumbai. She gave birth to a baby girl on 11 February 2016 in London.

== Filmography ==
=== Films ===
Raageshwari has acted in following films:

Key
†	Denotes films that have not yet been released

Year	Title	Role	Notes	Ref.
1993	Aankhen	Priya Mohan	Debut film as an actress	
1994	Zid	Sonia Modi	Second film as an actress	
1994	Dil Aa Gaya			
1994	Main Khiladi Tu Anari	Shivangi	Her first breakthrough film	
1997	Dil Kitna Nadan Hai	Kiran	Her final film prior to her acting break	
2002	Tum Jiyo Hazaron Saal	Sunanda Kohli		
2003	Mumbai Se Aaya Mera Dost	Star TV Reporter Priya		
2005	Brides Wanted		Unreleased film	
2006	The Making of Sagari Rayn	Herself	Short documentary film about the music video of "Sagari Rayn"	
2024	Savi	Simrit	Her first film as an actress after more than a decade.	
2025	Roi Roi Binale	Herself	Archive footage Assamese film	

=== Television ===
Year	Title	Role	TV Channel(s)	Notes	Ref.
1994–1996	BPL Oye!	Co-host	Channel V	Debut television show	
1996–1997	Bar Bar Dekho	Host/VJ	MTV	Her second television show	
1997–2001	MTV Ek Do Teen	Host/VJ	MTV	Primarily showcased Hindi songs, also featured Tamil, Telugu, Punjabi, Gujarati, Assamese and Bengali songs	
1998–1999	MTV Most Wanted	Host/VJ	MTV		
1999–2000	Mini Super Stars	Host	DD Metro	Indian voice children's show	
2001	Movers and Shakers	Special co-guest	SET India		
2002	Heart Throbs: Hrithik Roshan World Tour Live	Host/Performer	Zee TV		
2002	One on One with Rags	Host	TEN Sports		
2003	Kuch Kehti Hai Yeh Dhun	Host	SET India	Indian music game show	
2004	Zip Zap Zoom	Host	ARY Digital (Pakistan)		
2005	Queen's Baton Relay	Host			
2007	Show on Indian Mythologies on BBC Quest		BBC		
2011	Bigg Boss 5	Contestant	Colors TV	Evicted on Day 21 (week 3)	
2011	Jeene Ki Aasha		NDTV		
2012	Sab Gol Maal Hai		SAB TV		
2017	17th Asian Achievers Awards	Spectator	Colors TV, CCTV-4	Asian award show	
2017	Mr India 2017	Co-host	Zoom; Facebook; YouTube (via live telecast)	Her debut digital television show	
2020–2022	Mindful Mondays with Raageshwari	Host	FitTak; IGTV; YouTube	Digital motivational show	
2021	Mayabini Raatir Bukut	Cameo	NK TV	Assamese television musical talk show	
2026	Zubeen-Manasor Jatra: Web-Series Edition	Herself (Attendee)	Luit	Assamese musical concert mini-web series, contains previously unseen live concert footages between 2004 and 2005.	

=== Theatre ===
Raageshwari debuted as a lead in the musical comedy The Graduate alongside Zeenat Aman.

== Discography ==
=== Films ===
Year	Song	Film title	Language(s)	Music Director	Lyricist	Co-singer(s)	Notes
1989	"Gaadi Aati Hain Koi Aayega"	Oonch Neech Beech	Hindi	Laxmikant–Pyarelal	Rahi Masoom Raza	Suresh Wadkar, Kamlesh Avasthi	Debut film as a child artist playback singer
1997	(Score)	Dil Kitna Nadan Hai	Hindi	Anu Malik	—N/a	—N/a	Uncredited score vocals role Only appeared in the theatrical film This score was not included on the film's soundtrack.
1998	"Oye Shaava"	Bombay Boys	Hindi	Ashutosh Phatak, Dhruv Ghanekar, Trilok Singh Loomba	Trilok Singh Loomba	Solo	
2001	"Osaka Muraiya"	One 2 Ka 4	Hindi	A.R. Rahman	Majrooh Sultanpuri	Sonu Nigam	
2001	"Guncha Hai Gul Hai"	Mujhe Kucch Kehna Hai	Hindi	Anu Malik	Sameer	Sonu Nigam, Zubeen Garg	Background vocal only Not featured in the theatrical film Uncredited role
2002	"Osina Dekhot" (Female version)	Jonaki Mon	Assamese	Zubeen Garg	Jibaraj Barman	Solo	Only appeared in the theatrical film. This song was not included on the film's soundtrack.
2024	(Score)	Sikaar	Assamese, Sadri, English, Hindi	Poran Borkotoky		—N/a	British–Indian film Uncredited score vocals role

=== Albums ===
- Duniya (March 1997)
- Sach Ka Saath (January 1998)
- Pyaar Ka Rang (July 1998)
- Y2K - saal do hazaar (December 1999)
- Sagari Rayn (December 2006)
- Raageshwari's daily affirmation by Louise Hay (June 2013)
- Lifting the Veil – Ismaili Ginans(to be released)

==== Duniya ====
Duniya is a debut pop album. Originally scheduled for release in 10 March 1997, the album release was delayed by a week to 17 March 1997 due to The Notorious B.I.G.'s gunshot. All songs were written and composed by Trilok Singh Loomba. Tracks include:

- Duniya (music video)
- Chaahat
- Raftaar
- Kudi E' Punjab Di
- Medley
- Poore Karen Khwaab
- Rafta-Rafta
- Oye Saathi
- Kal Ki Na Fiqar
- Oye Shaava (music video)

==== Sach Ka Saath ====
Sach Ka Saath is a Patriotic Folk Music album by National Award-winning Music director/Singer 'Trilok Singh Loomba'. The album released in January 1998. The album featured 'Raageshwari' as a guest singer for the track 'Sach Ka Saath'. The other tracks include:

- Sach Ka Saath (music video)
- Bharat Banaayen Milkar
- Yeh Desh Hamaara
- Maya Jaal
- Pyaari Duniya
- Anushaasan
- Zindagi Kya Se Kya Hui
- Aatanki Aadam

==== Pyaar Ka Rang ====
Pyaar Ka Rang is a second pop album released in July 1998. Tracks include:

- Pyaar Ka Rang (music video)
- Jawanion Ke Din
- Baby Go For It
- Saat Samundar Par
- Haakan
- Party
- Pyaar Ka Khel (music video)
- Mere Mehboob (music video)

==== Y2K: Saal Do Hazaar ====
Y2K: Saal Do Hazaar is a third pop album released in December 1999. Tracks include:

- Y2K Saal Do Hazaar (music video)
- Y2K Dance Mix (music video)
- Mahiya
- Pehachaan
- Haakan (remix)
- Zakham
- Dil Sheesha
- Ikki Chikki Chikita (music video)

==== Sagari Rayn ====
Sagari Rayn is a fourth album and world music album released on 29 November 2006. This marked her first album after she recovered from severe endometriosis who diagnosed in late 2005. The majority of the songs were recorded during the period from 2003 to 2005, with the exception of the title track "Sagari Rayn," which was recorded in mid 2006. The music video was filmed entirely at Sharqiya Sands in Oman, marked her first music video in the Middle East. It was directed by her brother, Rishabh Singh Loomba. Music Tracks include:

- Sagari Rayn (music video)
- Kadmon Ke Nishan
- Mast Qalandar
- Jugni
- Maavan Te Dhiyan
- Dandiya Medley
- Holidays
- Hum
- Josh
- Balle Balle

==== Raageshwari's Daily Affirmation by Louise Hay ====
Raageshwari's Daily Affirmation by Louise Hay is a fifth album and her first daily affirmation album. It was released on 29 June 2013 at Reliance Digital, Andheri East, Mumbai. Unlike her previous albums that featured songs, it was her first entirely spoken-word audio album containing no songs, focusing purely on positive mental health affirmation based on Louise Hay's healing philosophies.

=== Replaced songs ===
Year	Film/Album	Song	Languages	Replaced By	Composer	Co-singer
2001	Daag	"Mayabini Ratir Bukut"	Assamese	Jonkey Borthakur	Zubeen Garg	
2001	Daag	"Jeni Jaba Xun"	Assamese	Mahalakshmi Iyer	Zubeen Garg	

=== Unreleased songs ===
Year	Film/Album	Song	Music Director
2007	Manorama Six Feet Under	"Woh Bheege Pal" (Female Version)	Jayesh Gandhi

== Bibliography ==
Year	Title	Ref.
2020	Building a Happy Family	

== Awards ==
Year	Category	Album/Song	Result
Channel V Music Awards
1997	Best Debut Indian Pop Album	Duniya	Nominated
1998	Best Music Video	Pyaar Ka Rang	Nominated
Screen Awards
1998	Best Debut Indian Pop Album	Duniya	Nominated
