= Okkadunnadu =

2007 film by Chandra Sekhar Yeleti

- DVD Cover
- Directed by: Chandra Sekhar Yeleti
- Written by: Story & Screenplay: Chandra Sekhar Yeleti; Dialogues: Koratala Siva
- Produced by: Chiranjeevi Pedamallu
- Starring: Gopichand; Neha Jhulka; Mahesh Manjrekar
- Cinematography: Jaya Krishna Gummadi
- Edited by: Mohan; Rama Rao; Chandra Shekar G. V.
- Music by: M. M. Keeravani
- Production company: Clap Entertainment
- Release date: 3 March 2007
- Running time: 136 minutes
- Country: India
- Language: Telugu

Okkadunnadu (lit. 'There is one man') is a 2007 Indian Telugu-language action thriller film directed by Chandra Sekhar Yeleti and produced by Chiranjeevi Pedamallu. The film stars Gopichand and Neha Jhulka, with Mahesh Manjrekar, Nassar, and Rahul Dev in key roles. It marks the film debut of model Neha Jhulka and Mahesh Manjrekar's debut in Telugu cinema. The music was composed by M. M. Keeravani.

The film follows Kiran, who has the rare Bombay blood group, and is forced to fight for survival when a gangster with the same blood group needs his blood and heart for a transplant. Released on 3 March 2007, the film received positive reviews for its screenplay, action sequences, and technical aspects.

== Plot ==
Kiran, who has the rare Bombay blood group, arrives in Mumbai to sell his guest house through the real estate agent Gautami. While helping a man in need of blood, he is approached by the gangster Sona Bhai, who shares the same blood type. Kiran agrees to donate blood, but Sona's nephew secretly warns him that he will be killed. After being sedated, Kiran is about to undergo the procedure when Sona's blood pressure rises uncontrollably, causing the operation to be delayed by 24 hours. When Kiran wakes up, Jayadev, Sona's trusted aid, tells him he must donate and leave the next day. Realising their true intentions, Kiran fights off the henchmen and escapes, angering Sona.

Later, Sona's nephew contacts Kiran and reveals that it's not just blood but Kiran's heart that is needed for transplantation and that Sona wants it. He urges Kiran to leave Mumbai. Meanwhile, Jayadev visits Gautami's office to buy Kiran's guest house but is told it's already sold and the seller has gone to Hyderabad. When Jayadev exits, he runs into Kiran, leading to a chase and a fight where Kiran defeats Jayadev's henchmen. Over drinks, Kiran explains to Gautami how he once led a wealthy life thanks to his father, who owned an honest private bank. However, his father was arrested after the bank suffered major losses and couldn't pay the depositors. The auditor told Kiran that the losses happened because the board members gave large loans to VIPs who didn't repay, though Kiran's father tried to fix things by selling his property.

Kiran got his father out on bail and promised to resolve the payment issues in 1 month. They met RBI official Janakiram, who demanded a ₹4 crore bribe. Kiran then came to Mumbai to secure the payment for the guesthouse, which was originally promised to be received in six months. After a violent fight with Sona's henchmen, Kiran is injected with a sedative, but he fights back, using improvised weapons to kill them all and escape with Gautami. Later, Kiran reveals everything about Sona to her. Seth, who had purchased the guest house, backs out of the deal, so Kiran forces him to pay the amount within 30 minutes. At the beach, Sona's nephew informs Kiran that Seth won't be paying.

Realizing that Seth fled out of fear of being killed by Sona, Kiran asks Gautami to find a new buyer for the guest house. He then again meets Sona's nephew, who reveals that Sona will remain a threat to him as long as he is alive and that the only way to eliminate him is by killing Kiran. A fight ensues, with Kiran defeating all the henchmen but sparing Sona's nephew for his earlier help. Kiran later contacts his father, discovering that Jayadev Investments is willing to invest ₹200 crore in their bank. He is shocked to learn that it was Sona who arranged the deal, offering the money in exchange for his heart. Kiran asks for time to think it over.

Kiran continues searching for a buyer for the guest house, and Gautami contacts Jayadev, who agrees to purchase it. However, Jayadev vandalises her office and orders her to inform Kiran that Sona will pay him ₹200 crore. Kiran confronts Sona, who has now bought the guest house, and threatens to cut off his life support if he does not pay him. After receiving ₹4 crore, Kiran meets Janakiram in Mumbai. At a hotel, Kiran discovers a CD revealing that Janakiram had colluded with Jayadev but was later killed. Jayadev had promised Janakiram ₹10 crore to keep Kiran from getting help.

Kiran goes to Sona's hotel and fights his goons. During the fight, Sona's nephew secretly reveals the room number where the money is kept. Kiran retrieves the money and destroys Sona's life support system. Sona's nephew is exposed when Sona and Jayadev see the room number written on his hand. The nephew admits that he wanted to inherit Sona's power, but since Sona's children will inherit everything, he planned to eliminate him. He then attempts to kill Sona but is instead shot by Jayadev. Sona also meets his demise. Kiran survives a gunfight and an explosion, while Jayadev shoots himself. Kiran escapes with the money.

== Cast ==
- Gopichand as Kiran
- Mahesh Manjrekar as Sona Bhai (Voice dubbed by P. Ravi Shankar)
- Nassar as Jayadev, Sona Bhai's trusted aid and right-hand man (Voice dubbed by Vinay Varma)
- Neha Jhulka as Gautami (Voice dubbed by Sunitha)
- Rahul Dev as Sona's nephew, who is vengeful against Sona Bhai (Voice dubbed by P. Ravi Shankar)
- Suman as Gowri Shankar, Kiran's father
- Brahmanandam as Auditor Krishna Rao
- Tanikella Bharani as Reserve Bank Official T. Janakiram
- Pragathi as Kiran's mother
- Giri Babu as Rajendra, Gautami's father
- Raghu Babu as Seth
- Banerjee as Gowri Shankar's brother-in-law and Kiran's uncle
- Rao Ramesh as a man searching for Bombay Blood Group
- Hema as Kiran's aunt
- Sivannarayana Naripeddi as Doctor
- Krishnudu as Junior Doctor
- Uttej as Constable
- Shobha Rani as Gautami's mother
- Abhishek as Gautami's brother
- Giridhar as Gautami's assistant
- Ambati Srinivas as Seenu, Gautami's assistant
- Madhuri as an anchor
- Ragasya (cameo appearance)

== Production ==
=== Development ===
The storyline of Okkadunnadu was originated from Chandra Sekhar Yeleti’s idea of using rare blood groups as the central conflict. The film revolves around the rare Bombay blood group, discovered in Bombay (now Mumbai), with real-life incidents related to it forming the basis of the plot. Additionally, the film features a backdrop of heart transplantation. To balance the unique theme, Yeleti included a familiar backdrop of bank scams in the hero's flashback.

While the hero's invincibility aligned with commercial cinema norms, scenes were included where he retreats from the antagonist's gang to introduce moments of vulnerability and balance the narrative. Additionally, a large suitcase was used as a battery backup for patients with rare blood groups to enhance the drama, even though smaller packs would have been more realistic. To offset the intense conflict between the protagonist and antagonist, Yeleti added a humorous dimension through the heroine's character. Humour and entertainment were intentionally kept minimal to maintain the film's serious tone.

P. Chiranjeevi, also known as Cherry, made his debut as a film producer with Okkadunnadu under the Clap Entertainment banner, collaborating with his friend and director Chandra Sekhar Yeleti. He has been active in the Telugu film industry since 1993, having previously worked as an executive producer and distributor on several successful films.

Koratala Siva wrote the dialogues for the film. After sharing dialogue writing credits on four films produced by Dil Raju, he took on the role of solo dialogue writer for this film.

=== Casting ===
Chandra Sekhar Yeleti wrote the script with Gopichand, Nassar, and Rahul Dev in mind for key roles. However, casting the antagonist and the female lead proved more challenging. The team sought a villain aged between 50 and 60 years and a heroine with a unique body language and unconventional appearance.

After careful consideration, Mahesh Manjrekar and Neha Jhulka were cast in these roles. Okkadunnadu marked Manjrekar's Telugu film debut. Despite his busy schedule as both a director and actor, he was convinced to join the project due to the script's strong appeal. Neha Jhulka, who had previously worked in commercials for brands such as Santoor, Airtel, and HDFC, made her feature film debut with this project.

Gopichand was advised by Yeleti to study Tom Hanks' performances for inspiration. For his role, Nassar adopted a distinct look by acting with one eye larger than the other to enhance his villainous presence.

=== Filming ===
The film was shot extensively in Mumbai. Jaya Krishna Gummadi, known for his work on Mr. & Mrs. Sailaja Krishnamurthy (2004), handled the cinematography. The art direction was managed by Ravindar, who oversaw the construction of sets in both Mumbai and Hyderabad, including three major sets in Hyderabad. Three fight masters—Allan Amin, Ram Lakshman, and Vijay—were hired to choreograph the action sequences.

During the re-recording, director Chandra Sekhar Yeleti stayed in Hyderabad, while the team had to travel to Dubai to shoot the songs. Krishna Vamsi directed these songs, with choreography by Noble.

== Music ==
Okkadunnadu

Soundtrack album by M.M. Keeravani
- Released: 10 February 2007
- Recorded: 2007
- Genre: Soundtrack
- Length: 21:04
- Label: Vel Records
- Producer: M.M. Keeravani

M.M. Keeravani chronology
Khatarnak (2006)	Okkadunnadu (2007)	Bhookailas (2007)

The music for Okkadunnadu was composed by M. M. Keeravani, and the audio soundtrack was released by Vel Records, a label founded by Keeravani's wife, Srivalli, who had previously launched it with the film Amma Cheppindi (2006).

The audio was launched at a function held near Durgam Cheruvu, Hyderabad, on the night of 10 February 2007. K. Raghavendra Rao officially released the audio and presented the first unit to D. Suresh Babu.

No.	Title	Lyrics	Singer(s)	Length
1.	"Manakakkarledu"	Anantha Sriram	Devi Sri Prasad	4:16
2.	"Abbo Vadento"	Jonnavithhula	Nani, Geeta Madhuri	3:58
3.	"Adugadugunaa"	Sirivennela Seetharama Sastry	M. M. Keeravani, Sunitha	4:05
4.	"I Say Enjoy"	Anantha Sriram	Geetha Madhuri	4:51
5.	"Ivaala Naa Pilupu"	Anantha Sriram	Shreya Ghoshal	3:56
Total length:				21:04

== Reception ==
=== Critical reception ===
The film received a positive response from the critics. Idlebrain.com gave the film a rating of 3.25/5 terming it a "Blood Chase". IndiaGlitz wrote, "Chandrasekhar Yeleti, a champion of gripping screenplay passes yet again with flying colours. The director was able to carry the whole film on action and was able to cater to the masses." Oneindia wrote, "The film might run well in B, C centres because of its mass appeal with good action scenes. Can be recommended to watch once only if you are interested in action films." Sify said, "Technically Okkadunnadu is brilliant with Gummadi Jaya Krishna's excellent photography, and the editing is slick. MM Keeravani's music is not great, but he scores in re-recording. In a nutshell, the film is an average flick which caters to urban audiences."

=== Box office ===
Okkadunnadu was released on 2 March 2007. The film opened strongly at the box office but saw a decline in collections after a few weeks. Producer Chiranjeevi Pedamallu described the film as a financially satisfactory venture for him, adding that distributors were also able to break even. However, director Chandra Sekhar Yeleti described the film as commercially unsuccessful. TV9 later called the film an average grosser at the box office.
