= Srinu Pandranki =

Indian author, film maker and screenwriter (born 1987)

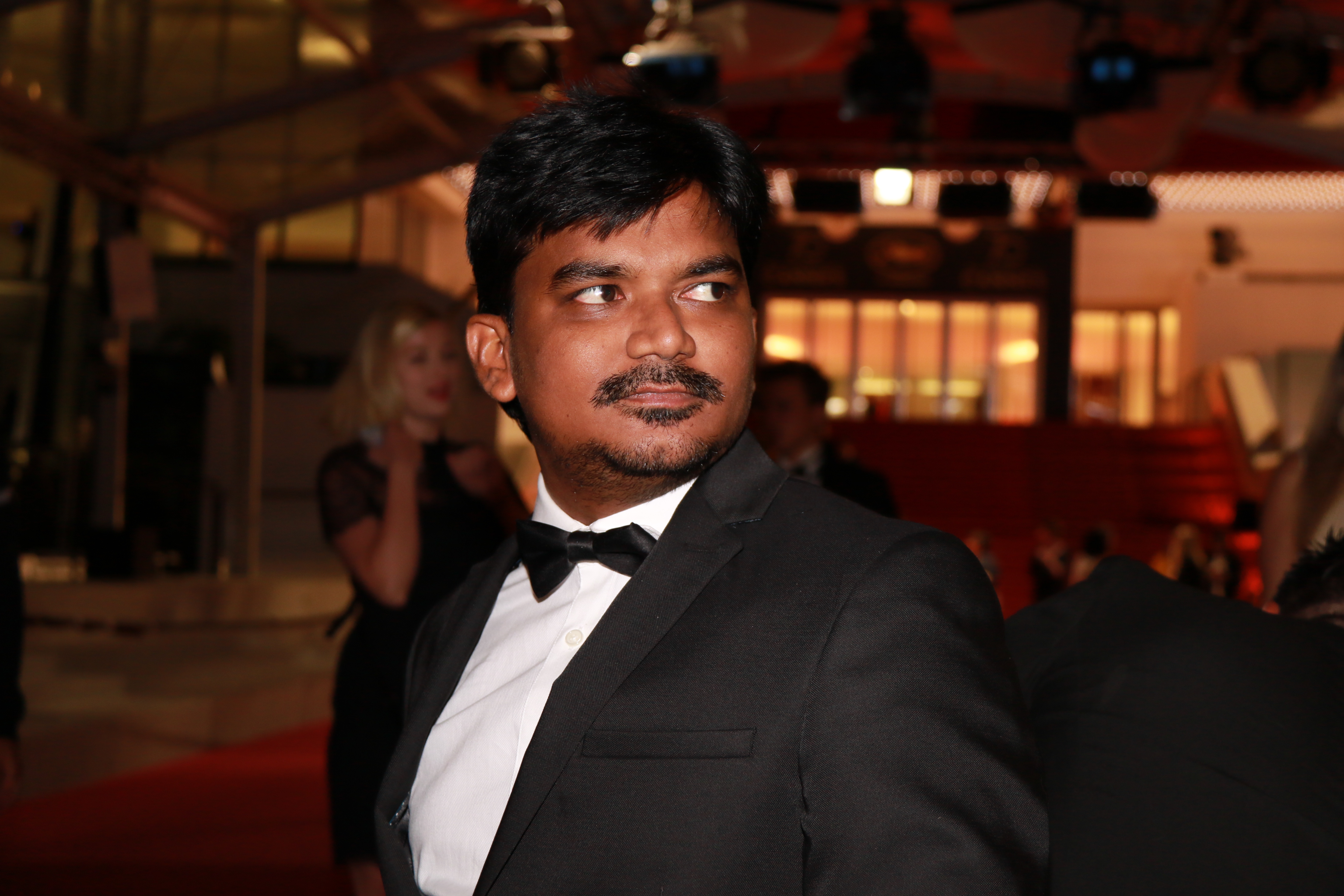
- Born: 5 October 1987 (age 39); Vizianagaram, Andhra Pradesh, India
- Occupations: Writer and filmmaker
- Years active: 2007 - Present

Srinu Pandranki (born 5 October 1987) also known by his pen name Mr. Zero Infinity, is an Indian author, film maker and screenwriter. He is noted for directing more than 30 Short films, Music videos, Documentaries and writing Novels, screenplays and short stories.

== Film career ==
Made thirty short films. Directional debut with the award-winning short film Flat No. 101. Next short film Art of Living is a 5-minute film depicting the life of an individual with and without a smile. This was followed by the short films Break the Silence and Pink Slip. The latter brought him recognition and nominations in various film festivals across the country. His short film Hour Glass is a silent film portraying a girl waiting for her parents to come home on her birthday. It is structured as a visual palindrome, the first of its kind. It is considered the world’s first publicly released film with a fully palindromic narrative structure. His short films are mostly known for their screenplays and unusual structure.

His two music videos were telecast on MAA music, a leading music channel in the Indian state of Andhra Pradesh.

His next short film Peek-a-boo is selected as an official entry in the Cannes Short Film Corner on 26 March 2014. It features Chaitanya Krishna in the lead role.

In 2017, he made a short film The Decision with noted Telugu film actress Lakshmi Manchu for which all top technicians including Anup Rubens Jayanan Vincent and Marthand K. Venkatesh have worked. It has been officially selected to 9th Jaipur International Film Festival 2017 and 5th Delhi Shorts International Film festival 2016.

His short film Estella (2017) featuring Ravi Varma has been screened in Cannes Film Festival 2017.

His next short film was Unusual, an experimental English film shot entirely in Germany.

He went onto make several Telugu music videos later on, one in India, One in Nepal, another in Thailand and couple of them in Philippines both in Tagalog and English Languages,

== Writing ==
His debut novel X^{2}, a crime thriller based in California in the United States, was released on 12 April 2014. It was launched by Ram Gopal Varma, a popular Indian director.

His Telugu novel "Nijanga Nenena", coming of age drama based in Hyderabad was released on 5 October 2021. Popular director V. N. Aditya was the chief guest and prominent directors and writers of Telugu film industry graced the event.

Later, he published the Indian edition of his novel X^{2} , followed by the time-traveling story "Second Chance in Time"

He has launched 2 story collections in October 2024 at Kathmandu, Nepal. "9 crazy stories" for adults and "Cute little Stories" for kids.

In 2025, for the first time he tried a non-fiction educational book "World of Sex" which has been launched in Pattaya, Thailand.

His recent work is a Political non fiction book "The Men Who Owned Nations" which has been release Worldwide.

== Lyrics ==
Srinu Pandranki made his debut as a lyricist with the 2025 Telugu-language film "Oka Brundavanam". The song, titled "Eshwara...", was composed by the debut music director duo Sunny & Saketh and performed by playback singer Dasari Aishwarya. The lyrics portray a woman in distress invoking Lord Eshwara for help.

== Short films ==
| Year | Title | Production | Language |
|---|---|---|---|
| 2007 | Life Is Beautiful | Srinu Pandranki | Telugu |
| 2007 | Flat no. 101 | Srinu Pandranki | Telugu |
| 2008 | Art of Living | Muneendra | Silent |
| 2009 | Break the Silence | Muneendra | Telugu |
| 2010 | Pink Slip | Anjan & Ram Kiran | Telugu |
| 2013 | Hour Glass | Srinu Pandranki | Silent |
| 2014 | Love Forever | Bhogapurapu Madhu & Parvati | Telugu |
| 2014 | Adieu Ordkut | Bhanu Kurella | English |
| 2015 | Upma Tinesindi | Praneeth Paleti | Telugu |
| 2015 | Unspoken | Praneeth Paleti | Silent |
| 2015 | Psuedocide | Praneeth Paleti | Telugu |
| 2015 | M.M.S | Praneeth Paleti | Telugu |
| 2016 | Happy Accidents | Venkat Bommineni | Telugu |
| 2016 | Boochi | Praneeth Paleti & SVK Chaitanya | Telugu |
| 2017 | Mega Fan | People Media Factory | Telugu |
| 2017 | Estella | Ram Productions | Telugu |
| 2017 | The Decision | People Media Factory | English |
| 2018 | Gudilo Puvvu | Jeedigunta Ramalakshmi | Telugu |
| 2018 | Dream Reader | Nirmala Devi | Telugu |
| 2018 | Mother Land | J. D. Cherukuri | Telugu |
| 2019 | Unusual | People Media Factory | English & Telugu |
| 2020 | Sweccha | Zero Budget | Telugu |
| 2022 | Friday Night | Dr. Murali Chand Ginjupalli | English |
| 2022 | Srushti | Timmarasu Sastry malladi & Kanaka Durga malladi | Telugu |
| 2024 | Time Traveler | Phani Kumar Vulli | Telugu |

== Documentaries ==
| 2017 | We are Mothers | Venkat Bommineni | Telugu |

== Music Videos ==
| 2010 | Don't Say Good Bye | Murali Nadakuditi | English |
| 2011 | Orchids | Murali Chand Ginjupalli | Telugu |
| 2022 | Kallu Kallu Kalisina Kshaname | Murali Chand Ginjupalli | Telugu |
| 2023 | Burqa | Timmarasu Sastry malladi & Kanaka Durga malladi | Telugu |
| 2025 | Lost Child | Haresh Nanda | Tagalog |
| 2025 | Xmas Joy | Venu Kusu | English |
| 2026 | Pinay Paraiso | Murali Chand Ginjupalli | Tagalog |

== Novels ==
| Year | Title | Publishing House | Language |
|---|---|---|---|
| 2014 | X^{2} | Create Space by Amazon | English |
| 2021 | Nijanga Nenena | PIP – Pandranki Innovative Publications | Telugu |
| 2022 | X^{2} Indian Edition | PIP – Pandranki Innovative Publications | English |
| 2023 | Second Chance in Time | PIP – Pandranki Innovative Publications | English |

== Short Story Collections ==
| Year | Title | Publishing House | Language |
|---|---|---|---|
| 2024 | 9 Crazy Stories | PIP – Pandranki Innovative Publications | English |
| 2024 | Cute Little Stories | PIP – Pandranki Innovative Publications | English |

== Non-Fiction ==
| Year | Title | Publishing House | Language |
|---|---|---|---|
| 2025 | World of Sex | PIP – Pandranki Innovative Publications | English |
| 2026 | The Men Who Owned Nations | PIP – Pandranki Innovative Publications | English |

== See also ==
List of Indian writers
