= Revu =

- Directed by: Harinath Puli
- Produced by: Dr.Murali Chand Ginjupalli; Naveen Parupalli
- Starring: Vamsi Ram Pendyala; Swathi Bheemireddy; Hemanth Udbhav; Ajay Nidadavolu; Sumesh Madhavan; Leela Venkatesh Kommuri
- Cinematography: Revanth Sagar
- Edited by: Shiva Sarvani
- Music by: Songs:John K Joseph Score:Vaishak Muraleedharan
- Production company: Samhith Entertainments
- Release date: 23 August 2024
- Running time: 134 minutes
- Country: India
- Language: Telugu

Revu (Harbor) is a 2024 Indian Telugu language action-drama film directed by Harinath Puli and produced by Murali Chand Ginjupalli and Naveen Parupalli. Background music by Vaishak Muraleedharan and songs by John K Joseph edited by Shiva Sarvani and camera handled by Revanth Sagar. Main lead roles performed by Vamsi Ram Pendyala, Swathi Bheemireddy, Hemanth Udbhav, Ajay Nidadavolu, Sumesh Madhavan and Leela Venkatesh Kommuri.

== Plot ==
Revu is a story about coastal fishermen, Ankalu and Gangaiah, who face challenges due to their rivalry for the best catch. The arrival of Nagesu disrupts the balance, affecting the lives of Samrajyam, Samba Shiva, Sada Shiva, and Bhushan. The narrative explores the consequences of ambition and power struggles within the community.

== Cast ==
- Vamsi Ram Pendyala
- Swathi Bheemireddy
- Hemanth Udbhav
- Ajay Nidadavolu
- Sumesh Madhavan
- Leela Venkatesh Kommuri
