= Neha Jhulka =

Indian Film and TV actress (born 1984)

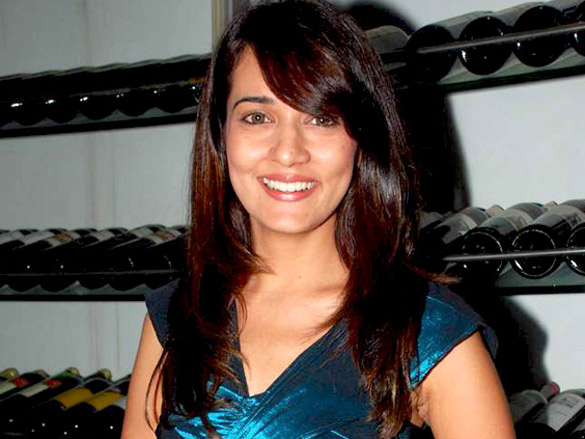
- Born: 30th October; Mumbai, india

Neha Jhulka is an Indian Film and TV actress. She mainly appeared in South Indian Films as well as Bollywood and Telugu Movies.she started her acting career in 2007 with the Telugu movie Okkadunnadu. In the same year, she appeared in another Telugu movie, Viyyala Vari Kayyalu and the Bollywood movie, Kaisay Kahein. Neha Jhulka also appeared in two television serials; Dill Mill Gayye and Geet – Hui Sabse Parayi.

== Filmography ==
=== Films ===
| Year | Title | Role | Language |
|---|---|---|---|
| 2007 | Okkadunnadu | Gautami | Telugu |
| 2007 | Viyyala Vari Kayyalu | Nandini | Telugu |
| 2007 | Kaisay Kahein | Radhika | Hindi |

=== TV shows ===
| Year | Title | Role | Language |
|---|---|---|---|
| 2009 | Dill Mill Gayye | Dr. Naina | |
| 2010 | Geet - Hui Sabse Parayi | Pari | |
| 2010 | Saas Bina Sasural | Divya | |
| 2023 | Happy Family: Conditions Apply | Diana | |

=== Music videos ===
- Chal Hun, Malkit Singh, King of Bhangra... Female Lead
- Kya Tujhe Pata Hai, Abhijeet Sawant - Female Lead
