= Jaya Krishna Gummadi =

Indian cinematographer (born 1974)

- Born: 1974 (age 51–52); Vijayawada, Andhra Pradesh, India
- Other name: JK
- Occupation: Cinematographer
- Parents: Jaya Prakash Gummadi (father); Janaki Rani (mother)

Jaya Krishna Gummadi (born in Vijayawada, Andhra Pradesh, India) is an Indian cinematographer who has worked in Telugu and Malayalam cinema. Even though he is from same village as that of Gummadi Venkateswara Rao, they are not related. Gummadi has received the National Film Award for Best Non-Feature Film Cinematography at the 56th National Film Awards, for his short film When This Man Dies. His diploma film Vadhakramam won the critics jury award at the Rio de Janeiro International Film Festival.

== Background ==
Gummadi was in 10th class when he got inspired by the spectacular cinematography in Geethanjali in 1989 and that's where his aspiration of being a cinematographer got wings. After getting his Degree in Photography from JNTU, he worked as an assistant to the noted cinematographer Sameer Reddy for 2 years. By 2004, he did Graduation in Motion Picture Photography from Film and Television Institute of India, Pune. As a student at FTII his dialogue film won Kodak Film school competition at the national level for his cinematography.

== Telugu cinema ==
After graduating from FTII, he came back to Hyderabad, to make his debut, as a cinematographer, for the Telugu film, Mr & Mrs Sailaja Krishnamurthy. This was followed by the 2009 Malayalam thriller, Winter, starring Jayaram. In 2007, Okkadunnadu was released. In 2008, he was credit for Idhi Sangathi, starring Tabu and Abbas. The film was noted for being shot on HD (High definition/viper camera). He has also been associated with a couple of short films. The most prominent being 22 Minutes, directed by renowned music director, R.P. Patnaik, and I am Famous, directed by R. Hanumantha Rao.

== International honor ==
In 2010, his significant contribution in Cinematography to a Marathi feature film Vihir won Best Cinematography Award in Asia Pacific Screen Awards, Australia.

== Filmography ==
Movie	Year	Language	Notes
2004	Mr & Mrs Sailaja Krishnamurthy	Telugu	
2006	Raam	Telugu	
2007	Okkadunnadu	Telugu	
2008	Idi Sangathi	Telugu	
2009	Winter	Malayalam	
2010	Andari Bandhuvaya	Telugu	
2011	Alif	Hindi	
2014	Pizza	Hindi	
2016	Karinkunnam Sixes	Malayalam	
2016	Phobia	Hindi	
2018	Padi Padi Leche Manasu	Telugu	
2020	World Famous Lover	Telugu	
2021	Haseen Dillruba	Hindi	
2021	Bhoot Police	Hindi	
2022	Plan A Plan B	Hindi	
2023	Rana Naidu	Hindi	Netflix Series; Season 1 only
2026	Srinivasa Mangapuram †	Telugu	
