= Sridhar Lagadapati =

Businessperson (born 1968)

- Occupation: Producer
- Years active: 2005–present

Sridhar Lagadapati (born 14 June 1968) is an Indian producer who works in Telugu films. He is the founder and head of Sirisuns Entertainment (Earlier Larsco Entertainment), a company based in Hyderabad (Telangana, India). Sirisuns produces films (under the banner of Ramalakshmi Cine Creations) and content for Television. Sridhar’s wife, Sirisha Lagadapati is the co-founder and partner alongside Sridhar in all aspects of Sirisuns.

== Biography ==
Sridhar Lagadapati was the co-founder of Lanco Infratech Ltd., along with his brothers Rajagopal Lagadapati and Madhusudhan Lagadapati. Lanco is an integrated infrastructure developer with interests in Power, Infrastructure, Construction and Property Development. After Sridhar founded Sirisuns (then Larsco Entertainment) in 2003, he gradually shifted his focus from Lanco Infratech (where he was then the Vice Chairman of the group) to Sirisuns Entertainment. Today, he is still a key executive and promoter of Lanco Infratech and continues in the capacity of Director in several of Lanco Infratech’s group companies.

After his return from the USA, Sridhar married Sirisha in 1995. Around this time Sridhar was also appointed Joint Managing Director of Lanco Infratech Limited (formerly Lanco Constructions). Subsequently, Sridhar took lead of the company as its Managing Director and then, as its Vice-Chairman. By 2003, he set up Sirisuns Entertainment along with Sirisha. He lives in Jubilee Hills at Hyderabad with his wife Sirisha and their two sons including Sahidev Vikram.

Sridhar is a trustee of Lanco Foundation (Earlier called LIGHT - Lanco Institute of General & Humanitarian Trust), and is the Managing Trustee of Sri Prasahi Charities, a personal charity founded by Sridhar and Sirisha.

== Filmography ==
Year	Title	Notes
2005	Evadi Gola Vaadidhi	
2006	Style	
2007	Viyyalavari Kayyalu	
2010	Sneha Geetham	
2013	Potugadu	
2014	Sikandar	Dubbed in Telugu from Tamil movie Anjaan; Co-produced with Thirrupathi Brothers and UTV Motion Pictures
2015	Krishnamma Kalipindi Iddarini	
2018	Naa Peru Surya	
2019	Evadu Thakkuva Kadu	
2022	Virgin Story	

== Critical reception and awards ==
Krishnamma Kalipindi Iddarini (2015): Won Best Romantic Film Award at Jaipur International Film Festival, 2016
