= St. Martinus University Faculty of Medicine =

Medical school in Wilemstand, Curaçao

St. Martinus University
- Motto in English: Committed to Excellence
- Type: Medical School
- Established: 2000
- Accreditation: AAEPO
- Chancellor: Sureyya Savasan MD
- President: Dr.Murali Chand Ginjupalli, Ph.D.
- Location: 18 Schottegatweg Oost, Willemstad, Curaçao
- Campus: 20 acres (8.1 ha); Urban
- Language: English
- Website: www.martinus.edu

St. Martinus University is a private medical school located in Willemstad, Curaçao, which started operating in 2000.

St. Martinus University offers a U.S. curriculum-based medical program, culminating in the award of a Doctor of Medicine(MD) degree upon successful completion of a four-year course of study. Third-year medical students do clerkships at Affiliated Hospitals, in Michigan.

In 2013 the university became a designated educational institution for the.Canada Student Loans.

St. Martinus University is listed in the World Directory of Medical Schools, and its graduates are eligible to apply for ECFMG certification, allowing them to take the United States Medical Licensing Examination and become licensed to practice medicine in the US. It is recognized by the Medical Council of India as a degree-granting university/institution.

St.Martinus University received full Program accreditation by Agency for Accreditation of Educational Programs and Organizations (AAEPO) a World Federation for Medical Education (WFME) Accredited Agency in December 2023.

== See also ==
- International medical graduate
- List of medical schools in the Caribbean
