= Naa Peru Surya =

2018 action film directed by Vakkantham Vamsi

Naa Peru Surya Naa Illu India
- Theatrical release poster
- Directed by: Vakkantham Vamsi
- Written by: Vakkantham Vamsi
- Produced by: Sirisha Sridhar Lagadapati
- Starring: Allu Arjun; Arjun Sarja; R. Sarathkumar; Anu Emmanuel
- Cinematography: Rajeev Ravi
- Edited by: Kotagiri Venkateswara Rao
- Music by: Songs: Vishal–Shekhar; Score: John Stewart Eduri
- Production company: Ramalakshmi Cine Creations
- Distributed by: Anjana Productions
- Release date: 4 May 2018
- Running time: 164 minutes
- Country: India
- Language: Telugu
- Budget: ₹55 crore
- Box office: est. ₹100.52 crore

Naa Peru Surya Naa Illu India (transl. My name is Surya, my home is India) is a 2018 Indian Telugu-language action drama film written and directed by Vakkantham Vamsi in his directorial debut. Produced by Ramalakshmi Cine Creations, the film stars an ensemble cast including Allu Arjun as the titular character, with Arjun Sarja, R. Sarathkumar, Anu Emmanuel, Boman Irani, Thakur Anoop Singh, Sai Kumar, Pradeep Rawat, Harish Uthaman, Rao Ramesh, Nadhiya Moidu and Vennela Kishore in pivotal roles. In the film, a soldier struggling with anger issues is challenged to change his behaviour in order to fulfill his dream of serving at the borders. The music was composed by Vishal–Shekhar with editing by Kotagiri Venkateswara Rao.

The film was released on 4 May 2018. The reception was mixed, with praise towards the performances of Allu Arjun, R.Sarathkumar and Arjun Sarja and production values, but criticism towards the script, runtime, pace, and direction. R. Sarathkumar won SIIMA Award for Best Actor in a Negative Role (Telugu) for his role in the film.

== Plot ==
Surya is a soldier in the Indian Army who suffers from anger management issues and dreams of being posted at the LOC. After getting into a brawl at a local club and attacking Inspector Himanshu Negi and stealing the latter's gun, Surya uses it to shoot a terrorist dead right when the officer comes to ask for the gun from Surya's senior Lt Gen Sanjay Shrivastav. Surya's dreams are now shattered after being court-martialled for disciplinary action. His godfather requests Shrivastav to give Surya a final chance. Shrivastav agrees on the condition that Surya gets a signature of approval from the country's top psychologist and the Dean of the Institution of Psychology and Foreign Languages, Dr. Rama Krishnam Raju, who happens to be Surya's estranged father.

In order to fulfill his dream of going to the border, Surya agrees, taking up residence with a passport officer named Kishore, who has been waiting for a year for a similar signature from Raju. Upon meeting, Surya and Raju refuse to acknowledge each other, and Raju questions Surya's personal life. Surya reveals to Raju his relationship with Varsha, whom he broke up with when she distanced him after finding out about his profession and disrespected her uncle (twice). Surya gets frustrated, in turn accusing Raju of enjoying himself by listening to Surya's failures. Raju then reveals Surya to the entire university.

Surya then takes up a challenge from Raju to control his anger for three weeks and not cause any fights from the following day. He, however, beats up a young gangster when the latter makes a commotion in the middle of the road; the young gangster is revealed to be the son of a dreaded gangster, Challa, the very day before the challenge is to start, as a final fight. In the following days, Surya encounters several situations with Challa and his men; however, being able to control his anger and even becoming used to living within society has reformed him.

However, things take a turn when Surya ends up as the sole witness to the murder of Mustafa at the hands of Challa's son, over a property dispute. He keeps quiet about this, as he learns from society. However, he is guilt-tripped when Police Officer Krishna Kumar, who was investigating Mustafa's murder, addresses him as someone who made a great impact on the latter's life. Meanwhile, Surya reconciles with his father, returns to his family, makes up with Varsha, and seemingly wins the challenge. However, he addresses his mistake publicly and refuses to take the signature. Having completely realized his error, Surya attacks and kidnaps Challa's son, asking Challa to help him find Mustafa's son Anwar, who expressed his hatred against the nation, which he believes did not recognize his father's sacrifices or death and left his home. Surya fears that Anwar may follow a wrong path, and both he and Challa set off on a mission to recover Anwar.

On finding Anwar in Mumbai, Surya makes him realize his mistake and warns him not to take the wrong route in life, after which Anwar shows his care for his nation. Raju thinks that Surya couldn't win the challenge as he couldn't sacrifice his character. Still, Surya receives Raju's signature and they hug, and a few months later, he is shown to be standing at the border hoisting the Indian Flag.

== Cast ==
- Allu Arjun as Surya, an Indian Army soldier and Raju's son
- Arjun Sarja as Prof. Rama Krishnam Raju, Surya's father
- R. Sarathkumar as Challa, a dreaded gangster
- Anu Emmanuel as Varsha, Surya's lover
- Boman Irani as Lt Gen Sanjay Shrivastava, Surya's superior
- Thakur Anoop Singh as Challa's son
- P. Sai Kumar as Mustafa (An Indian EX Major)
- Pradeep Rawat as PC
- Harish Uthaman as PC's brother
- Rao Ramesh as Surya's godfather
- Nadhiya as Satya, Surya's mother
- Vennela Kishore as Kishore, a passport officer
- Charuhasan as Mustafa's father
- Posani Krishna Murali as Varsha's uncle
- Ravi Kale as Inspector Himanshu Negi
- Y. Kasi Viswanath as Varsha's father
- Raja Chembolu as Krishna Kumar IPS
- Vikram Sahadev as Anwar, Mustafa's son
- Janaki Verma as Challa's wife
- Satya Krishnan as Mustafa's wife
- Prabhas Sreenu as Challa's henchmen
- Denzil Smith as Politician
- Shvithi K as Baby Shvithi

== Production ==
The film marks the directorial debut of Vakkantham Vamsi. Vamsi had previously written screenplays for successful Telugu films such as Kick (2009) and Race Gurram (2014). The film stars Allu Arjun, Anu Emmanuel and Arjun Sarja, with R. Sarathkumar portraying the main antagonist. Editing was handled by Kotagiri Venkateswara Rao, while cinematography and art direction were by Rajeev Ravi and Rajeevan respectively.

== Soundtrack ==
The soundtrack for the film was composed by Vishal–Shekhar. The original score is composed by Vishal–Shekhar and John Stewart Eduri. After a successful collaboration in Tiger Zinda Hai, Vishal–Shekhar cast Meghdeep Bose to produce their songs for this album. The first single from the film, "Sainika", was released on Indian Republic Day, 26 January 2018, as a tribute to the soldiers of the Indian Army. The film's second single "Lover Also, Fighter Also" was released on 14 February 2018. The Naa Peru Surya audio launch event was held on 22 April at Military Madhavaram, West Godavari, Andhra Pradesh. The Naa Peru Surya, Naa Illu India pre-release event was organized on 29 April at Gachibowli Stadium, Hyderabad.

Track listing (original – Telugu)
No.	Title	Lyrics	Artist(s)	Length
1.	"Sainika"	Ramajogayya Sastry	Vishal Dadlani	4:20
2.	"Lover also, Fighter also"	Ramajogayya Sastry	Shekhar Ravjiani	3:56
3.	"Beautiful Love"	Sirivennela Seetharama Sastry	Armaan Malik, Chaitra Ambadipudi	4:51
4.	"Maya"	Ramajogayya Sastry	Arijit Singh, Ramya Behara	3:54
5.	"Yenniyallo Yenniyallo"	Ramajogayya Sastry	Malavika	1:44
6.	"Iraga Iraga"	Ramajogayya Sastry	Mohana Bhogaraju, Rahul Sipligunj	4:00

Track listing (Tamil dubbed)
No.	Title	Lyrics	Artist(s)	Length
1.	"Desathin Ellai Oramae"	Pa. Vijay	Palakad Sairam	4:20
2.	"Aadi Kalukae Nenjukulla Than"	Pa. Vijay	V. M. Mahalingam	3:56
3.	"Oru Kanam Mayanguthu Manam Manam"	Pa. Vijay	Karthik, Sameera	4:51
4.	"Maya"	Pa. Vijay	Karthik	3:54
5.	"Kondatamo Kondatam Than"	Pa. Vijay	Roshini	1:44
6.	"Adi Atthe Ezhuthu Manasa"	Pa. Vijay	M. L. R. Karthikeyan, Rita	4:00

Track listing (Malayalam dubbed)
No.	Title	Lyrics	Artist(s)	Length
1.	"Ee Sainikan"	Siju Thuravoor	Anvar Saduth	4:20
2.	"Lover also, Fighter also"	Siju Thuravoor	Zia Ul Haq	3:56
3.	"Beautiful Life"	Siju Thuravoor	Zia Ul Haq, Jyothsana	4:51
4.	"Jeevitham Puzhayay"	Siju Thuravoor	Madhu Balakrishnan	3:54
5.	"Kannanunni"	Siju Thuravoor	Syama Siju, Athuira Janakan	1:44
6.	"Avesham Vithani"	Siju Thuravoor	Sam Shiva, Priya Jerson	4:00

Track listing (Hindi dubbed)
No.	Title	Length
1.	"Lover also, Fighter also"	4:00
2.	"Beautiful Love"	4:25
3.	"Maya"	3:54
4.	"Desi Katta"	4:02

== Release ==
The film was scheduled to release on 27 April 2018, due to post-production delays, the release date was pushed to 4 May 2018. The film was released on 4 May 2018 along with its dubbed versions simultaneously in Tamil as En Peyar Surya, En Veedu India, in Malayalam as Ente Peru Surya Ente Veedu India and in Hindi on TV and OTT as Surya The Soldier.

=== Critical reception ===
Naa Peru Surya, Naa Illu India received mixed reviews but critics appreciated Allu Arjun's performance, calling it the "biggest strength to the film" and his "career-best performance". The Hans India critic Vyas gave it 3.25/5 stars, writing, "Na Peru Surya is a film that gives us solid entertainment throughout the movie. The film starts off impressively and takes a U-turn to the interval point. The best part of the movie is that the director is stuck to the core point and did not deviate himself from the main content." Idlebrain.com gave it a 3/5 rating and wrote: "Though the director tried to cater to all cross section of audiences by having all types of elements in the first half, he made sure that he sticks to the basic plot of the film towards the climax. Allu Arjun stands out in the film with his stylish and terrific performance."

Neeshitha Nyapati of The Times of India gave it 2.5/5 stars, reviewing, "Naa Peru Surya is a hard film to describe, what with so much happening in a span of fewer than 3 hours. The film has all the requirements of a commercial potboiler – there's unbridled patriotism, a love track, a family drama, an ambitious man striving to make it big in his career, several points of conflict replete with goondas and other moral dilemmas that all play out, interspersed at regular intervals with colourful and highly choreographed songs." Priyanka Sundar in her Hindustan Times review gave it 2.5/5 stars, concluding, "Naa Peru Surya is a film that would work purely because of dramatic emotional moments in combination with the high powered action sequence, something that Tollywood is well known for."

It was known as Allu Arjun's worst flop ever. The movie was so bad he did not release a movie in 2019.

=== Re-release in Hindi ===
In December 2020, the film was re-released in the states of Uttar Pradesh and Bihar with 50% cap on theatre occupancy due to COVID-19 pandemic. The Hindi dubbed version, titled Surya The Soldier, was well received at the box office, despite releasing after 3 years post original release and being available on YouTube and Zee5.
