= Hum Sub Chor Hain (1995 film) =

Ham Sab Chor Hain
- Theatrical release poster
- Directed by: Ambrish Sanghal
- Written by: Bashir Babar (dialogues); Nawab Aarzoo (lyrics)
- Screenplay by: Amrit Aryan
- Story by: Amrit Aryan
- Produced by: Hiren Bafna; Sangeeta Bafna
- Starring: Dharmendra; Jeetendra; Kamal Sadanah; Ritu Shivpuri
- Cinematography: Sushil Chopra
- Edited by: Prakash Dave
- Music by: Bappi Lahiri
- Production company: Shree Durga Laxmi Enterprises
- Release date: 27 October 1995
- Running time: 141 minutes
- Country: India
- Language: Hindi

Ham Sab Chor Hain (transl. We are all Thieves) is a 1995 Hindi-language action film, produced by Hiren Bafna and Sangeeta Bafna under the Shree Durga Laxmi Enterprises banner and directed by Ambrish Sanghal. It stars Dharmendra, Jeetendra, Kamal Sadanah, Ritu Shivpuri and music composed by Bappi Lahiri.

== Plot ==
ACP Ravi Verma and his brother Kamal lose their parents, who are murdered by three ruthless criminals: Hunterwala, Bhothnath and Naichand, who work for Chakradhar. The brothers escape from prison but disagree over how to bring the criminals to justice. Kamal seeks revenge, while Ravi insists on arresting them and allowing the judicial system to punish them.

Meanwhile, Vijay Kumar works as a supplier of domestic servants to wealthy households. By night, he assumes the role of a modern-day Robin Hood, stealing the proceeds of illegal activities from the rich and distributing them among the poor. Ravi is assigned to capture him.

Kamal, his lover Rithu, and Geeta, Ravi's lover, join Vijay's team. Vijay is also driven by a desire for revenge against Chakradhar, who murdered his wife. He seeks to bring Chakradhar to justice and have him imprisoned.

In the climax, Ravi, Vijay and Kamal unite to confront Chakradhar and the other criminals, determined to put an end to their activities.

== Cast ==
- Dharmendra as Vijay Kumar
- Jeetendra as ACP Ravi Kumar D. Verma
- Sujata Mehta as Rashmi
- Kamal Sadanah as Kamal D. Verma
- Ritu Shivpuri as Ritu
- Aasif Sheikh as Rajrani
- Mohan Joshi as Chakradhar
- Puneet Issar as Bhootnath
- Gajendra Chouhan as Police Commissioner Yashwant Vij
- Ram Mohan as Vishwakarma
- Vikas Anand as Inspector Dinanath Verma
- Tiku Talsania as Mantri Narayan Malhotra
- Ram Sethi as Peter
- Birbal as Bajrangi
- Yunus Parvez as Phoolchand
- Reema Lagoo as Kamla, Ritu's mom
- Upasna Singh as Sonia
- Aparajita as Mrs. D. Verma
- Shraddha Verma as Drishti
- Girja Shankar as Nainsukh

== Soundtrack ==
The music of the film was composed by Bappi Lahiri, and all songs are written by Nawab Arzoo. Notable singers Kumar Sanu, Udit Narayan, Abhijeet, Vinod Rathod, Sadhana Sargam, Kavita Krishnamurthy, Alka Yagnik, Ila Arun, Sapna Mukherjee and Arun Bakshi rendered their voices in this album.

#	Title	Singer(s)
1.	"Saawli Saloni Teri"	Kumar Sanu, Alka Yagnik
2.	"Tota Se Lad Gaye"	Kumar Sanu, Kavita Krishnamurthy, Ila Arun
3.	"Meri Biwi Lakhon"	Vinod Rathod, Alka Yagnik
4.	"Tere Mere Pyar Ka" (Duet)	Udit Narayan, Sadhana Sargam
5.	"Hogi Ishq Di"	Udit Narayan, Abhijeet, Arun Bakshi
6.	"Sona Sona Chand Sa"	Abhijeet, Kavita Krishnamurthy, Arun Bakshi
7.	"Tere Mere Pyar Ka" -2	Kavita Krishnamurthy, Sapna Mukherjee
