= Aankhen (1993 film) =

1993 Indian film by David Dhawan

- Theatrical release poster
- Directed by: David Dhawan
- Written by: Anees Bazmee
- Produced by: Pahlaj Nihalani
- Starring: Govinda; Chunky Pandey; Raj Babbar; Shakti Kapoor; Raageshwari; Ritu Shivpuri
- Cinematography: Siba Mishra
- Edited by: Nand Kumar
- Music by: Songs: Bappi Lahiri; Lyrics: Indeewar
- Distributed by: Chiragdeep International
- Release date: 9 April 1993
- Running time: 170 minutes
- Country: India
- Language: Hindi
- Box office: ₹25 crore

Aankhen (transl. Eyes) is a 1993 Indian Hindi-language action-comedy film directed by David Dhawan and written by Anees Bazmee. It stars Govinda (in a double role), Chunky Pandey, Raageshwari (in her debut film), Ritu Shivpuri (in her debut film), Shilpa Shirodkar, Kader Khan, Sadashiv Amrapurkar, Shakti Kapoor and Raj Babbar. Along with Govinda, Kader Khan and Raj Babbar also play double roles.

It was the highest-grossing Indian film of 1993. It was remade in Telugu as Pokiri Raja (1995).

The film was reported to have been inspired by the 1977 Kannada movie Kittu Puttu which itself was inspired by the 1967 Tamil movie Anubavi Raja Anubavi which had earlier been remade in Hindi in 1973 as Do Phool. It is also adapted from Marathi film Changu Mangu released in 1990.

At the 39th Filmfare Awards, the film received four nominations - Best Film, Best Director (Dhawan), Best Actor (Govinda) and Best Comedian (Khan) but failed to win in any category.

== Synopsis ==
Hasmukh Rai's sons Munnu and Gulshan "Bunnu" are slackers involved in elaborate practical jokes. Hasmukh discovers that his sons have been lying to him about their college grades, in studies and sports and have been failing exams for the last three years. As a result, they are expelled from college and ultimately, their home. Later, one of their practical jokes gets out of hand, and Bunnu disappears, presumed dead. Munnu becomes involved in the conspiracy of killing Bunnu. Meanwhile, from a small Indian village, Bunnu's identical cousin, Gauri Shankar, arrives in town. He is mistaken for Bunnu, leading to hilarious misunderstandings and uproar.

== Cast ==
- Govinda (in a dual role) as:
  - Vijay Rai "Bunnu": Munnu's brother; Ritu's husband
  - Gauri Shankar Rai: Munnu and Bunnu's cousin; Chandramukhi's husband
- Chunky Pandey as Munnu Rai: Bunnu's brother; Priya's husband
- Ritu Shivpuri as Ritu Bunnu Rai: Bunnu's wife
- Raageshwari as Priya Munnu Rai: Munnu's wife
- Shilpa Shirodkar as Chandramukhi Rai: Gauri's wife
- Bindu as Anuradha
- Harish Patel as Monto (hired principal / hired father / hired thief - by Munnu-Bunnu)
- Shakti Kapoor as Tejeshwar
- Radha Seth as Diana: Tejeshwar's accomplice
- Mahavir Shah as Pravin Shah
- Gulshan Grover as Natwar Shah
- Raza Murad as D.C.P
- Mac Mohan as Tejeshwar's henchman
- Sudhir as Tejeshwar's henchman
- Tinu Verma as Tejeshwar's henchman
- Gavin Packard as Tejeshwar's henchman: Man mistakenly shot for Bunnu
- Dina Pathak as Mrs. Rai: Hasmukh and Neelkanth's mother
- Vikas Anand as Distinguished Doctor
- Govind Namdeo as Distinguished Doctor
- Kader Khan in a (dual role) as:
  - Hasmukh Rai: Bunnu and Munnu's father
  - Neelkanth Rai: Gauri Shankar's father; Hasmukh Rai's brother
- Raj Babbar (in a dual role) as:
  - Chief Minister
  - Saarang: Tejeshwar's accomplice
- Sadashiv Amrapurkar as Inspector Pyaare Mohan
- Arun Bakshi as a Man who saved Bunnu
- Rakesh Bedi as Gulshan Kapoor "Gullu"
- Bob Christo as Tejeshwar's henchman
- Neena Gupta as Chief Minister's wife
- Kamaldeep as St. Xavier's Principal
- Manmauji as Baba
- Guddi Maruti as Chhabia
- Yunus Parvez as Seth Sukhiram
- Kedarnath Saigal as Judge

== Soundtrack ==
Aankhen

Soundtrack album by Bappi Lahiri
- Released: 9 April 1993
- Genre: Hindi Film Soundtrack
- Label: Venus Music
- Producer: Bappi Lahiri

The music was composed by Bappi Lahiri. The lyrics were penned by Indivar. Album has five songs sung by Kumar Sanu, Sudesh Bhonsle, Mohammed Aziz, Asha Bhosle, Sapna Mukherjee, Kavita Krishnamurthy, Alka Yagnik, Sadhana Sargam and Arun Bakshi. According to the Indian trade website Box Office India with around 30,00,000 units sold the soundtrack became the fourth highest-selling album of the year.

No.	Title	Singer(s)	Length
1.	"O Lal Dupatte Wali"	Kumar Sanu, Sudesh Bhosle, Kavita Krishnamurthy, Alka Yagnik	05:50
2.	"Angna Mein Baba"	Kumar Sanu, Sadhana Sargam	06:07
3.	"Bade Kaam Ka Bander"	Kumar Sanu, Mohammed Aziz, Arun Bakshi	06:41
4.	"Ek Tamanna Jivan Ki"	Kumar Sanu, Asha Bhosle	04:21
5.	"Chaukhat Pe Tumhari Hum"	Kumar Sanu, Mohammed Aziz, Sapna Mukherjee	06:42
Total length:			29:01

== Reception ==
The film was 1993's biggest Bollywood hit and ran in the theaters for 12 weeks. The domestic distribution share was ₹38.5 crore against a ₹5.96 crore budget. The film had a net income of ₹35.5 crore, and grossed ₹45.85 crore ($8.2 million).

== Accolades ==
39th Filmfare Awards:

Category	Nominee	Result
Best Film	Pahlaj Nihalani	Nominated
Best Director	David Dhawan	Nominated
Best Actor	Govinda	Nominated
Best Comedian	Kader Khan	Nominated
