= Krishnamma Kalipindi Iddarini =

- Directed by: R. Chandru
- Written by: Sainath Thotapalli
- Story by: R. Chandru
- Produced by: Sridhar Lagadapati
- Starring: Sudheer Babu; Nanditha Raj
- Cinematography: K. S. Chandrashekar
- Edited by: Ramesh Kolluri
- Music by: Hari
- Distributed by: Ramalakshmi Cine Creations
- Release date: 19 June 2015
- Running time: 133 minutes
- Country: India
- Language: Telugu

Krishnamma Kalipindi Iddarini (transl. The Krishna River brought us together) is a 2015 Telugu romance film directed by R. Chandru and produced by Sridhar Lagadapati. The film stars Sudheer Babu, and Nanditha Raj, with music by Hari. The film is a remake of the 2013 Kannada film Charminar, also directed by Chandru.

The film got selected for Jaipur International film festival for competition category, where it won Best Romantic Film.

== Cast ==
- Sudheer Babu as Krishna
  - Vikram Sahadev as young Krishna
- Nanditha Raj as Radha
- Posani Krishna Murali as Nageswara Rao, Krishna's college principal
- Chaitanya Krishna as Krishna's college mate
- Saptagiri as Bhaskar
- Giri Babu as Krishna's father
- Pragathi as Radha's mother
- Raghu Babu
- Abhijeeth Poondla
- Kishore Das
- Rana Daggubati as himself (cameo appearance)
- Naga Chaitanya as himself (cameo appearance)

== Production ==
Sridhar Lagadapati decided to remake the Kannada film Charminar in Telugu after he was impressed with the film. Chandru and Hari who were part of Kannada original was chosen to direct and compose music for this version thus making their debuts in Telugu films. Sudheer Babu and Nanditha, who earlier paired in Prema Katha Chitram (2013), were chosen for the film. Makers have modified the premise of the film in the Telugu version to suit the Krishna river.

== Soundtrack ==
The music was composed by Hari, who reused all of the songs from the original. The soundtrack was released under the Aditya Music label.

- 01 – "Veelunte" – Nakul Abhyankar
- 02 – "Radhe Radhe" – Haricharan
- 03 – "Ola Ola" – Hari, Hemachandra
- 04 – "Madana Mohana" – Pranavi, S. P. B. Charan
- 05 – "Tuhi Tuhi" – Haricharan, Sunil Kashyap, Lipsika
- 06 – "Naalo Premey" - Hari

== Reception ==
Jeevi of Idlebrain.com wrote that "Krishnamma Kalipindi Iddarini is a well-intended film that stays away from forced commercial elements and sticks to the basic plot. Though the movie starts as a teen love story, there is nobility in the way story progresses".
