= Viyyalavari Kayyalu =

- Poster
- Directed by: E.Satti Babu
- Written by: Sainath
- Produced by: Sridhar Lagadapati
- Starring: Uday Kiran; Neha Jhulka
- Cinematography: Ajayan Vincent
- Edited by: Marthand K Venkatesh
- Music by: Ramana Gogula
- Distributed by: Ramalakshmi Cine Creations
- Release date: 1 November 2007
- Running time: 140 minutes
- Country: India
- Language: Telugu

Viyyalavari Kayyalu is a 2007 Indian Telugu-language romantic comedy family drama film directed by E. Satti Babu and starring Uday Kiran and Neha Jhulka. L. Sreedhar, produced it under their banner Larsco Entertainments of Ramalakshmi Creations. It was released on 1 November 2007.

== Plot ==
Vamshi (Uday Kiran) is a hair stylist who falls in love with Nandini (Neha Jhulka), sister of Bhoopathi Rayudu (Srihari), a good hearted factionist. Vamshi and Nandini decides to get married only with the consent of their elders. So Vamshi comes to Juturu, a village in Rayalaseema to convince Bhoopati Rayudu of his love with the latter's sister. Initially Bhoopati doesn't like Vamshi and everyone laughs at Vamshi when he says that he is a hair stylist in city. But the pair believes that true love never runs away but stands brave even after initially being rejected. Bhoopati values the word given by any of his family members and stands by it. The second half shows the "Kayyalu" (light hearted quarrels) between the elders of the two sides. Vengal Reddy (Jaya Prakash) tries to become the MLA by violence and thinks of Bhoopati but in vain. Even after Vamshi convinces Bhoopati, he is worried on how to convince his parents. Uday is son of a Justice (Sayaji Shinde), a person who believes that one should not go beyond the law and hate corrupted ones. How the pair and Bhoopati convinces the Justice forms the rest of the plot.

== Cast ==
- Uday Kiran as Vamshi
- Neha Jhulka as Nandini
- Srihari as Bhoopati Rayudu
- Brahmanandam as Bobby
- Jaya Prakash Reddy as Vengal Reddy
- Raghu Babu as Raghu, Vamshi's friend
- Sayaji Shinde as GK (Gurajada Krishnamurthy), Vamshi's father
- Kavitha as Kaveri, Vamshi's mother
- Kausalya as Bhoopati Rayudu's wife
- Telangana Shakuntala as Shakuntala, Bhoopati's Grandmother
- Narsing Yadav as Narasimha, Bhootpati's brother
- Venu Madhav Venu, Vamshi's friend
- Paruchuri Venkateswara Rao as Venkatachalam, Gurajada Krishnamurthy's friend
- Giri Babu as Rama Chandra Murthy, Vamshi's Uncle
- L. B. Sriram as Sriram, Real Estate & Beggar
- Lakshmipathi as Somanna, Bhoopati Rayudu's Babber
- Sudeepa Pinky as Vamshi's sister
- M. S. Narayana as Narayana, Marriage Broker
- Suman Shetty as Pappu, Vamshi's friend
- Krishna Bhagavan as Krishna, Vengal Redd's Babber
- Dharmavarapu Subramanyam as Vidyanadam Reddy, Bhoopati Rayudu Personal Doctor
- Ahuti Prasad as Prasad
- Brahmaji as Pilli Rama Krishna Simha
- Sivaji Raja as Srinivas

== Soundtrack ==
Ramana Gogula scored music for the movie and there was massive response to the audio. The audio of the film was launched at Prasad Labs at 11 am on 6 September 2007. Akkineni Nageswara Rao released the audio and handed over the first cassette to Dr D Ramanaidu. Supreme Music is marketing the album. The album was an instant hit.

| No. | Title | Singer(s) | Length |
|---|---|---|---|
| 1. | "Telusa Cheli" | Naveen, Ganga |
| 2. | "Surude Sare Annadu" | K. S. Chitra, Ramana Gogula, Sri Krishna |
| 3. | "Neelala Neekallu" | Sri Krishna, Sunitha |
| 4. | "Manmatha" | Kalpana, Vijayalakshmi |
| 5. | "Hey Handsome" | Ramana Gogula, Kalpana |
| 6. | "Mallechenda" | R. P. Patnaik, Ganga |
| 7. | "Neelala Neekallu (English Remix)" | Ramana Gogula |

== Reception ==
A critic from Rediff.com said that "On the whole, an entertaining film". A critic from Sify wrote that "Viyyalavari Kayyalu is a good love story with all the correct masala ingrediants [sic]".
