= Sneha Geetham =

2010 Indian film

- Directed by: Madhura Sreedhar Reddy
- Screenplay by: Madhura Sreedhar Reddy; Mohan Bharadwaja
- Produced by: Sridhar Lagadapati
- Starring: Sundeep Kishan; Suhani Kalita; Chaitanya Krishna; Mahima; Venky Atluri; Shreya Dhanwanthary
- Cinematography: P. G. Vinda
- Edited by: Lokesh Chenna
- Music by: Sunil Kashyap (songs); Chinna (score)
- Production company: Larsco Entertainment
- Release date: 16 July 2010
- Running time: 134 minutes
- Country: India
- Language: Telugu
- Box office: ₹3 crore distributors' share

Sneha Geetham (transl. The Song of Friendship) is a 2010 Indian Telugu-language coming of age drama film written and directed by Madhura Sreedhar Reddy and produced by Sridhar Lagadapati. It features three pairs Sundeep Kishan, Suhani Kalita, Chaitanya Krishna, Venky Atluri and Shreya Dhanwanthary in lead roles. It was a commercial hit at the box office.

== Plot ==
Sneha Geetham's main plot revolves around three youngsters Ravi (Venky Atluri), Krishna (Chaitanya Krishna) and Arjun (Sundeep Kishan). The movie opens with a beautiful message to youth from the voice over of sensational director V. V. Vinayak stating "Life is a chance, living is a choice. So, follow the heart and future is ours." Ravi, Krishna, Arjun, Shailu (Shreya Dhanwanthary) and Pooja (Ria) are good friends who study engineering in Nalla Malla Reddy College of Engineering, Hyderabad. The movie begins with these five friends introducing themselves to seniors in their first year ragging and progresses to final year campus interviews.

Ravi lost his parents in his childhood and is brought up in his relative's house. Ravi is not interested in working for any company. He aspires to become a businessman by starting his own business. So, he doesn't attend campus interviews. He likes playing chess with I.V. Raman (Shankar Melkote) and learns a lot from his experience. Shailu is intelligent and she gets selected for a job through campus interview in Voxel IT Company. Shailu is upset with the fact that Ravi did not attend campus interview. She loves Ravi but she doesn't know if Ravi has same feelings for her too. Ravi also likes her but he doesn't express it to her.

Krishna is batch topper and aspires to become a software engineer. He secures a job in IBM in the campus interview. He has a simple life policy called '54321' which he defines as 5 Digit Salary, 4 Wheel Car, 3 Bedroom House, 2 Cute Children and 1 Beautiful Wife. Pooja gets disturbed with the fact that her parents always fight with each other. Even though Pooja's academic performance is just average, she is still offered a job in the campus interview because of her project manager Ajay (Lohit) having special interest in her. Krishna and Pooja are deeply in love with each other.

Arjun is an ardent fan of film director Ram Gopal Varma and wants to become a successful film director. He is not interested in engineering, higher studies and campus interview jobs. He studies the degree only because his father (A R C Babu) persuades him. His mother (Sruthi) understands his aim and supports him to become a film director.

Pitamaha (Krishnudu) is the senior most student in the college failing for ten years and loves to continue in the college guiding his juniors. A.I.D.S Papa Rao (Venu Madhav) is one of the lecturers in the college and wishes to earn more money by grabbing a software job in order to satisfy his wife bangaru rajyam's shopping needs. He also secretly attends campus interview and gets a job in Voxel through backdoor by bribing 2 lakhs to interviewer Kishore. Average Bhadram (Praveen Kumar), batchmate of hero trio also grabs a job in campus interview.

On the farewell day, Arjun plans a video shoot in the college with all his batchmates and on his way to college, Mahalakshmi (Suhani Kalita), first year Computer Science student asks him for lift to college. He drops her at college and then finishes the video shoot. Later on farewell day, Arjun introduces Maha to his friend's gang. Maha is born and brought up in U.S. She comes to India to stay with her grandmother and study engineering in Hyderabad. Maha likes Arjun and comes with his gang to attend Bhadram's marriage in a village. When Shailu receives a call from her father that she got a good match from US, she reveals to her friends that she loves Ravi. Ravi knows this and proposes his feelings to her. Both of them unite and Shailu convinces her father for one-year extension that she is not interested in that marriage.

Meanwhile, Arjun gets only one year time to try for films as director. Arjun's father wants him to go to U.S. and study M.S. after that deadline. As part of his trials, Arjun meets Box Office Bhushanam (Vennela Kishore) and gives his power script to him hoping to get a chance as a director. Pooja's manager, Ajay pesters her often with bad intentions and offers to drop her in his car. Krishna sees this and misunderstands Pooja. He feels that Pooja is neglecting him and he starts avoiding her calls. Then, It is revealed that Pitamaha has blood cancer and is admitted into hospital. That is the main reason he kept failing all the subjects and has been living his college life for all the ten years. Arjun, Krishna, Ravi, Bhadram and Vali go to see him in the hospital and Pitamaha dies while speaking to his friends. With the inspiration from Pitamaha's life, Ravi presents his project proposal to a company and gets a positive feedback. Paparao is forced to resign his IT job by his manager as Paparao keeps failing his C language test for three months and he becomes Papaji Swami.

Being harassed by her project manager Ajay, Pooja goes to Krishna's house and reveals the truth to him. Angered Krishna goes with Pooja to Ajay and thrashes him. Pooja resigns her job and plans to apply in IBM where Krishna is working. Arjun gets to know from a producer that his story script was sold for Rs. 2 lakhs to that producer by Box Office Bhushanam. Angered Arjun goes and beats Box Office Bhushanam. With support from Krishna and Ravi, Arjun starts working on writing another script, meets producer Sridhar Lagadapati and narrates the script. Shailu's parents arrange her marriage with a U.S. boy and Ravi's project is postponed temporarily by venture capitalists due to economic recession even though they liked his project. With motivation from I.V. Raman, Ravi goes to Shailu's father and convinces him for marriage. Arjun's father forces Arjun to go to U.S. as one year is complete and helpless Arjun starts to airport just to see his father happy even though he gets call from Producer Office. On the way to airport, Arjun's father realises that his son respects him so much and stops Arjun from going. Arjun's script is accepted and he becomes a director. He conveys his love to Maha as well for which Maha has been waiting for so long. Ravi's project is approved and Shailu's parents are happy. Pooja gets a job in Krishna's office and both are waiting to convince Pooja's parents and get married. The movie ends on a positive note with the message "Follow your heart and conquer the world" in the voice of V. V. Vinayak.

== Cast ==
- Sundeep Kishan as Arjun
- Suhani Kalita as Mahalakshmi
- Chaitanya Krishna as Krishna
- Mahima as Pooja
- Venky Atluri as Ravi
- Shreya Dhanwanthary as Shailu
- Krishnudu as Pitamaha Veera Venkata Satya Narayana
- Shankar Melkote as I. V. Raman, ex CEO of Global Media Solutions
- Vennela Kishore as Box Office Bhushanam
- Venu Madhav as Lecturer A.I.D.S Papa Rao
- Praveen Kumar as Average Bhadram
- A R C Rao as Arjun's Father
- Sruthi as Arjun's Mother
- Lohit as Project Manager Ajay
- Gopi as Srikanth
- Varanasi Soumya as Srinidhi
- V. V. Vinayak (voiceover)

== Production ==
This film was shot in 52 working days. Sundeep Kishan was chosen from six thousand men.

== Music ==
The music album consisted of four tracks composed by Sunil Kashyap. Lyrics were penned by SiraSri and Chinni Charan.

Track	Song	Artist(s)	Lyricist (s)
1	"Oka Snehame"	Karthik	SiraSri
2	"Entho Enthentho"	Ranjith, Rita	SiraSri
3	"Gala Gala"	Sunil Kashyap, Prasanna	Chinni Charan
4	"Sarigama Padhani"	Sunil Kashyap, Pranavi	Chinni Charan
5	"Vasanthamedhi"	Karthik	Chinni Charan
6	"Velige Vennele"	Sai Shivani	Sira Sri
7	"Veyo Veyo"	Benny Dayal	Sira Sri

== Release ==
This film was released with 35 prints.

== Awards ==
- Pranavi won Nandi Award for Best Female Playback Singer for the song "Sarigamapadani"
