= Ritu Shivpuri =

Indian actress and model

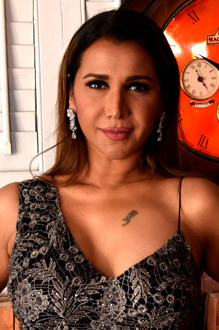
- Born: Mumbai, Maharashtra, India
- Occupations: Actress, model, Jewellery designer
- Years active: 1993–2006; 2016–present
- Spouse: Hari Venkat
- Parent(s): Om Shivpuri; Sudha Shivpuri

Ritu Shivpuri is an Indian actress and model, notable for her work in Hindi and Kannada cinema. Daughter of actors Om and Sudha Shivpuri, Ritu made her acting debut in a leading role in the 1993 film Aankhen, which was the highest grossing film of that year.

== Filmography ==
- 1993: Aankhen
- 1995: Ham Sab Chor Hain
- 1995: Rock Dancer as Ritu
- 1997: Aar Ya Paar
- 1997: Bhai Bhai
- 1997: Dongaata
- 1999: Z
- 1999: Nyaydevata
- 1999: Kaala Samrajya
- 2000: Hadh Kar Di Aapne
- 2000: Glamour Girl
- 2001: Lajja
- 2002: Shakti: The Power
- 2005: Elaan
- 2005: Dubai Return
- 2006: Ek Jind Ek Jaan
- 2024: Kooki

=== Television ===
- 2016: 24: India as Dr. Sunny
- 2017: Iss Pyaar Ko Kya Naam Doon 3 as Indrani Yash Narayan Vashishth
- 2019: Nazar as Shalaka
- 2019: Vish as Rudrama
- 2019: Karenjit Kaur - The Untold Story of Sunny Leone l as Neena
- 2023: Class
