= Daag (2001 film) =

2001 Indian film by Munin Barua

- Directed by: Munin Barua
- Written by: Munin Barua
- Screenplay by: Munin Barua
- Produced by: Nilotpal Chaudhary
- Starring: Jatin Bora; Tapan Das; Anurupa Pathak; Bishnu Kharghoria
- Edited by: A. Sreekar Prasad
- Music by: Zubeen Garg
- Production company: Prathana Films
- Distributed by: Pooja Motion Pictures
- Release date: 2 February 2001
- Running time: 174 min
- Country: India
- Language: Assamese

Daag is a 2001 Indian Assamese action-drama film directed by Munin Barua and produced by Nilotpal Chaudhary. It was released on 2 February 2001 and was the first Assamese film of 2001. It starred Jatin Bora, Tapan Das and Anurupa Pathak in a leading role. This film marked Jatin-Zubeen-Munin's second collaboration after Hiya Diya Niya (2000).

This film marked Anurupa Pathak's acting debut and only film to date.

== Cast ==
- Jatin Bora as Rahul Baruah
- Tapan Das as Rohit Baruah
- Anurupa Pathak as Baishnabi
- Bishnu Kharghoria as Lalit
- Arun Nath as Dr. Ajoy Hazarika
- Mridula Baruah as Jayanti Hazarika
- Hiranya Deka as Gohain / Mohandas
- Chetana Das as Pramila Rani Bormudoi
- Indira Rao

== Soundtrack ==
Daag

Soundtrack album by Zubeen Garg
- Released: 10 November 2000 (Audio Cassette); 6 January 2001 (Audio CD)
- Recorded: January 2000–May 2000
- Genre: Feature film soundtrack
- Language: Assamese
- Label: Wave Music
- Producer: Nilutpal Choudhary

Zubeen Garg chronology
Tumi Mor Matho Mor (1999)	Daag (2000)	Sesh Upahar (2001)

The music soundtrack of Daag was composed by Zubeen Garg. It marked his third film as a music director after Hiya Diya Niya (2000) and Tumi Mor Matho Mor (2000). It was supposed to release on 3 October 2000 coincided with Durga Puja celebration, however, the release was delayed to 10 November 2000 following the death of Zubeen's mother, Ily Borthakur. The vocals were performed by Zubeen Garg, his sister Jonkey Borthakur, Mahalakshmi Iyer, Shashwati Phukan, Utpal Sharma, Rupjyoti Devi and Diganta Bharati, who marked his debut film as a playback singer. While all songs became superhit, the track "Mayabini Ratir Bukut" became one of Garg's signatures romantic hit song and became his first major breakthrough Assamese song.

In September 2025, following Zubeen Garg's death, the song was widely sung by fans and mourners to pay tribute. According to The Times of India, at his cremation "a chorus of his beloved song, 'Mayabini Ratir Bukut,' transformed the somber occasion into a moving celebration of his life." Garg had previously requested that this song be played after his death, and tributes poured in from across Assam, India and worldwide.

This song was also featured during the ICC Women's Cricket World Cup 2025 held in Guwahati, where playback singer Shreya Ghoshal paid tribute to Garg with a touching performance. She presented a medley of his well-known songs, culminating with this song during the mid-innings of the opening match between India and Sri Lanka.

During an episode of India's Got Talent, contestants presented a rendition of Mayabini Ratir Bukut as a tribute to Zubeen Garg. The performance prompted judge Shaan to reflect on his association with Garg and acknowledge the song's lasting significance in Assamese music.

The soundtrack of Daag marked the first collaboration between Zubeen and Diganta where they sang together for the song "Monole Ubhoti Aahe Loralir."

Bollywood playback singer Raageshwari Loomba was originally supposed to sing "Jeni Jaba Xun" alongside Zubeen Garg and was also slated to provide background vocals for the track "Mayabini Ratir Bukut". However, she had to withdraw from these projects after being diagnosed with Bell's palsy. Subsequently, Mahalakshmi Iyer took her place for the song "Jeni Jaba Xun", while Jonkey Borthakur replaced her for "Mayabini Ratir Bukut".

Tracklist
No.	Title	Lyrics	Singer(s)	Length
1.	"Mayabini Ratir Bukut"	Zubeen Garg	Zubeen Garg
2.	"Monole Ubhoti Aahe Loralir"	Zubeen Garg, Diganta Bharati	Zubeen Garg, Diganta Bharati
3.	"Bisarisu Kakhorote"	Diganta Bharati	Zubeen Garg, Shashwati Phukan
4.	"Loralir" (Theme)		Zubeen Garg, Diganta Bharati
5.	"Kinu Bhaba Emankoi"	Zubeen Garg	Zubeen Garg, Utpal Sharma, Rupjyoti Devi
6.	"Daag Mur Bukute"	Zubeen Garg	Zubeen Garg
7.	"Botahe Botahe"	Diganta Bharati	Zubeen Garg, Jonkey Borthakur
8.	"Jeni Jaba Xun"	Diganta Bharati	Zubeen Garg, Mahalakshmi Iyer
9.	"Monole Ubhoti Aahe Loralir" (Sad Version)	Zubeen Garg, Diganta Bharati	Zubeen Garg
