= Mayabini Ratir Bukut =

Song by Zubeen Garg

from the album Daag
- Language: Assamese
- Released: 10 November 2000
- Recorded: January 2000
- Studio: Geet Audiocraft, Mumbai, Maharashtra
- Genre: Assamese, Romantic
- Label: Wave Music
- Songwriter: Zubeen Garg
- Composer: Zubeen Garg
- Producer: Zubeen Garg

Daag track listing
- 1. "Mayabini Ratir Bukut"; 2. "Monole Ubhoti Aahe Loralir"; 3. "Bisarisu Kakhorote"; 4. "Kinu Bhaba Eman Koi"; 5. "Daag Mur Bukute"; 6. "Loralir (Theme)"; 7. "Botahe Botahe"; 8. "Jeni Jaba Xun"; 9. "Monole Ubhoti Aahe Loralir (Sad)"

"Mayabini Ratir Bukut" (Assamese: মায়াবিনী ৰাতিৰ বুকুত, English: "In the bosom of the magical night") is a romantic Assamese song by singer-composer Zubeen Garg. It was released on 10 November 2000 as part of the soundtrack of the Assamese film Daag, directed by Munin Barua. The background vocals are provided by Zubeen Garg's sister Jonkey Borthakur, although they remain uncredited. The artistic form and emotion felt by the artist become emotionally accessible to listeners through the artist's skillful word choice, mood-appropriate expression, and ornamentation.

== Background ==
The song was written and composed by Zubeen Garg, one of the most popular voices of modern Assamese music. It featured in the soundtrack of Daag, a commercially successful Assamese film. Bollywood playback singer Raageshwari Loomba was originally intended to provide background vocals for this song; however, she withdrew after being diagnosed with Bell's palsy. Later, she was replaced by Jonkey Borthakur.

== Lyrics ==
Assamese script

মায়াৱিনী ৰাতিৰ বুকুত
দেখা পালোঁ তোমাৰ ছবি
ধৰা দিলা গোপনে আহি হিয়াৰ কোণত
তুমি যে মোৰ শুকান মনত
নিয়ৰৰে চেঁচা টোপাল
নামি অহা ৰ’দৰে নৈ মোৰ দেহত প্ৰতি পুৱা
ধুমুহাৰ সতে মোৰ বহু যুগৰে নাচোন
এন্ধাৰো সঁচা মোৰ বহু দিনৰে আপোন
নিজানৰ গান মোৰ শেষ হ’ব
ভাবোঁ তোমাৰ বুকুত।

প্ৰতি শৰতৰ প্ৰভাতী ফুলে
ক’ব তোমাকেই মোৰ কথা
প্ৰতি মেঘালী নিশা জোনে
ক’ব তোমাকেই মোৰ ব্যথা
ধুমুহাৰ সতে মোৰ বহু যুগৰে নাচোন
এন্ধাৰো সঁচা মোৰ বহু দিনৰে আপোন
নিজানৰ গান মোৰ শেষ হ’ব
ভাবোঁ তোমাৰ বুকুত।

দুচকুতে তোমাৰ চালে
সপোন আঁতৰি দিঠক নামে
চুব খুজিলেই মোৰ দুহাতে
দিঠক আঁতৰি সপোন আহে
ধুমুহাৰ সতে মোৰ বহু যুগৰে নাচোন
এন্ধাৰো সঁচা মোৰ বহু দিনৰে আপোন
নিজানৰ গান মোৰ শেষ হ’ব
ভাবোঁ তোমাৰ বুকুত।

মায়াৱিনী ৰাতিৰ বুকুত
দেখা পালোঁ তোমাৰ ছবি
ধৰা দিলা গোপনে আহি হিয়াৰ কোণত
তুমি যে মোৰ শুকান মনত
নিয়ৰৰে চেঁচা টোপাল
নামি অহা ৰ’দৰে নৈ মোৰ দেহত প্ৰতি পুৱা॥

IPA transcription (Note: This transcription follows the artistic pronunciation traditionally used in Assamese singing. In this register, the retroflex plosives ট, ঠ, ড, ঢ are generally realized as [ʈ, ʈʰ, ɖ, ɖʱ], the dental plosives ত, থ, দ, ধ as [t̪, t̪ʰ, d̪, d̪ʱ], জ as [d͡ʒ], and ৰ as [ɾ], respectively. However, in colloquial Assamese, the dental–retroflex distinction is frequently reduced, with both the dental and retroflex plosives commonly being realized as [t, tʰ, d, dʱ], while জ may be realized as [z] and ৰ as [ɹ].) (Note: See Help:IPA/Assamese and Assamese phonology.)

[majabini ɾat̪iɾ bukut̪]
[d̪ɛkʰa palʊ̃ t̪ʊmaɾ sɔbi]
[d̪ʱɔɾa d̪ila ɡʊpɔne aɦi ɦijaɾ kʊnɔt̪]
[t̪umi d͡ʒɛ mʊɾ xukan mɔnɔt̪]
[nijɔɾɔɾɛ sɛ̃sa ʈʊpal]
[nami ɔɦa ɾod̪ɔɾɛ nɔi̯ mʊɾ d̪ɛɦɔt̪ pɾɔt̪i puwa]
[d̪ʱumuɦaɾ xɔt̪e mʊɾ bɔɦu d͡ʒuɡɔɾɛ nasʊn]
[ɛnd̪ʱaɾʊ xɔ̃sa mʊɾ bɔɦu d̪inɔɾɛ apʊn]
[nid͡ʒanɔɾ ɡan mʊɾ xɛx ɦobɔ]
[bʱabʊ̃ t̪ʊmaɾ bukut̪]

[pɾɔt̪i xɔɾɔt̪ɔɾ pɾɔbʱat̪i pʰulɛ]
[kobɔ t̪ʊmakɛi̯ mʊɾ kɔt̪ʰa]
[pɾɔt̪i mɛɡʱali nixa d͡ʒʊnɛ]
[kobɔ t̪ʊmakɛi̯ mʊɾ bɛt̪ʱa]
[d̪ʱumuɦaɾ xɔt̪e mʊɾ bɔɦu d͡ʒuɡɔɾɛ nasʊn]
[ɛnd̪ʱaɾʊ xɔ̃sa mʊɾ bɔɦu d̪inɔɾɛ apʊn]
[nid͡ʒanɔɾ ɡan mʊɾ xɛx ɦobɔ]
[bʱabʊ̃ t̪ʊmaɾ bukut̪]

[d̪usɔkut̪ɛ t̪ʊmaɾ salɛ]
[xɔpʊn ãt̪ɔɾi d̪iʈʰɔk namɛ]
[subɔ kʰud͡ʒilɛi̯ mʊɾ d̪uɦat̪ɛ]
[d̪iʈʰɔk ãt̪ɔɾi xɔpʊn aɦɛ]
[d̪ʱumuɦaɾ xɔt̪e mʊɾ bɔɦu d͡ʒuɡɔɾɛ nasʊn]
[ɛnd̪ʱaɾʊ xɔ̃sa mʊɾ bɔɦu d̪inɔɾɛ apʊn]
[nid͡ʒanɔɾ ɡan mʊɾ xɛx ɦobɔ]
[bʱabʊ̃ t̪ʊmaɾ bukut̪]

[majabini ɾat̪iɾ bukut̪]
[d̪ɛkʰa palʊ̃ t̪ʊmaɾ sɔbi]
[d̪ʱɔɾa d̪ila ɡʊpɔne aɦi ɦijaɾ kʊnɔt̪]
[t̪umi d͡ʒɛ mʊɾ xukan mɔnɔt̪]
[nijɔɾɔɾɛ sɛ̃sa ʈʊpal]
[nami ɔɦa ɾod̪ɔɾɛ nɔi̯ mʊɾ d̪ɛɦɔt̪ pɾɔt̪i puwa]

English translation

In the heart of the enchanting night,
I caught a glimpse of your image.
Secretly, you came and surrendered in the corner of my heart.
To my parched mind, you are
A cold drop of dew,
A descending river of sunlight upon my body every morning.
My dance with the storm spans across the ages,
The darkness, too, has long been a true companion of mine.
My song of solitude will come to an end,
I think, within your embrace.

Every morning flower of autumn
Will tell only you of my story.
Every cloudy night, the moon
Will tell only you of my pain.
My dance with the storm spans across the ages,
The darkness, too, has long been a true companion of mine.
My song of solitude will come to an end,
I think, within your embrace.

When I look into your eyes,
Dreams fade away and reality descends.
Whenever my two hands reach out to touch you,
Reality fades away and dreams appear.
My dance with the storm spans across the ages,
The darkness, too, has long been a true companion of mine.
My song of solitude will come to an end,
I think, within your embrace.

In the heart of the enchanting night,
I caught a glimpse of your image.
Secretly, you came and surrendered in the corner of my heart.
To my parched mind, you are
A cold drop of dew,
A descending river of sunlight upon my body every morning.

== Reception and legacy ==
The song has become one of Garg’s signature romantic songs.

In September 2025, following Garg’s death, the song was sung by his fans fans and Assam government official to pay tribute. Garg had previously requested that this song be played after his death, and tributes poured in from across Assam, India and worldwide.

Mukut Das for The Times of India noted that at Garg's cremation “a chorus of his beloved song, ‘Mayabini Ratir Bukut,’ transformed the somber occasion into a moving celebration of his life.”

Ritika Kumar for Hindustan Times observed that “touched millions,” placing it alongside his major Hindi hits like "Ya Ali". The article highlights how Mayabini Ratir Bukut showcases Garg’s ability to blend modern arrangements with Assamese lyrical traditions, making it a romantic song for generations.

Abhishek Dey, writing for BBC noted that the song has become one of the defining works associated with Garg’s nostalgia. The song was described as an exemplar of his ability to combine Assamese romantic poetry with contemporary soundscapes, giving it resonance far beyond the state.

At the ICC Women’s Cricket World Cup 2025 in Guwahati, noted playback singer Shreya Ghoshal honoured Garg with a heartfelt performance singing the song at innings break of the India vs Sri Lanka match.

During an episode of India’s Got Talent, contestants presented a rendition of Mayabini Ratir Bukut as a tribute to Garg. The performance prompted judge Shaan to reflect on his association with Garg and acknowledge the song’s lasting significance in Assamese music.

Kaziranga National Park named a newborn elephant calf as Mayabini in honour of Garg, drawing inspiration from the song.

The song is frequently cited in retrospectives of Garg’s discography as one of his defining Assamese songs, marking his evergreeen creation for Assamese music.

== Controversy ==
In the aftermath of Zubeen Garg's death in September 2025, "Mayabini Ratir Bukut" became the subject of public debate after reports emerged that the track had disappeared from, or been renamed on, several major streaming platforms, prompting questions about rights management and catalogue control and intensifying discussion of issues surrounding the singer's death and its aftermath.

Local media reported that listeners and fan groups observed the track missing or listed under different titles on services such as Spotify, Apple Music, JioSaavn and YouTube Music; these reports generated widespread discussion on social media and in regional press. Some outlets and commentators noted that the recording rights were associated with Zubeen Garg Music LLP and that questions about catalogue control, metadata issues, or ongoing legal matters may have contributed to the song's temporary unavailability on certain platforms. The extent and cause of the removals have not been confirmed by the streaming services in publicly available statements cited in reliable news coverage.
