= Murali Chand Ginjupalli =

Indian film producer and administrator

- Born: Guntur, Andhra Pradesh, India
- Occupations: Academic Administrator, Film Producer
- Office: President of St. Martinus University Faculty of Medicine

Murali Chand Ginjupalli is an Indian academic administrator and film producer. He serves as the President of St. Martinus University Faculty of Medicine in Curaçao.

== Early life and education ==
Ginjupalli was born in Guntur, Andhra Pradesh, India. He began his pharmacy education in Karnataka in 1990 and earned a Master's degree from Andhra University in Visakhapatnam in 1999.

== Career ==
=== Academic career ===
Dr.Ginjupalli became the Chancellor of St. Martinus University Faculty of Medicine in Curaçao. During his tenure, the university has undertaken efforts to align its accreditation with the standards of the World Federation for Medical Education (WFME). He also supervised a master's thesis at the Turkish International University in 2023.

=== Film production career ===
Ginjupalli has produced films in the Telugu cinema industry. His production work includes Revu (2024), whose theatrical trailer was launched by producer Dil Raju, and Wild Breath, which featured actor Shivaji Raja. The film's music and promotional events received coverage in Telugu entertainment press.

== Philanthropy ==
Ginjupalli established the Ginjupalli Foundation in 2009. The foundation is involved in medical, educational and social service activities in both India and the United States. During the COVID-19 pandemic, his pharmacies administered numerous vaccinations.The foundation also donated backpacks to orphans on the birthday of Telugu actor Nandamuri Balakrishna.

== Awards and recognition ==
Ginjupalli received the "Iconic Award 2024" at a ceremony in New Delhi. His return to his Raichur alma mater was covered as a visit by a global academic leader.

== See also ==
- St. Martinus University Faculty of Medicine
- Telugu cinema
- Revu
