= Dongaata (1997 film) =

- Theatrical release poster
- Directed by: Kodi Ramakrishna
- Written by: Diwakar Babu (story / dialogues)
- Screenplay by: Kodi Ramakrishna
- Based on: French Kiss (1995)
- Produced by: Dr. K. L. Narayana; S. Gopal Reddy (Presenter)
- Starring: Jagapati Babu; Soundarya; Suresh; Ritu Shivpuri
- Cinematography: S. Gopal Reddy
- Edited by: Nandamuri Hari
- Music by: Bharadwaj
- Production company: Sri Durga Arts
- Release date: 11 July 1997
- Running time: 138 minutes
- Country: India
- Language: Telugu

Dongaata is a 1997 Indian Telugu-language drama film directed by Kodi Ramakrishna. It stars Jagapati Babu, Soundarya, Suresh, Ritu Shivpuri, with music composed by Bharadwaj. It is produced by Dr. K. L. Narayana under the Sri Durga Arts banner and presented by S. Gopal Reddy. The film was inspired by the English film French Kiss (1995), which was remade in Hindi later on as Pyaar To Hona Hi Tha (1998).

== Cast ==
- Jagapati Babu as Raju
- Soundarya as Subbalakshmi
- Suresh as Prakash Rao
- Ritu Shivpuri as Lavanya
- Kota Srinivasa Rao as Subbalakshmi's father
- Brahmanandam as Constable
- Sudhakar as Paropakari Papanna, a thief
- Sarath Babu as ASP Vikram
- Babu Mohan as a pimp
- Mallikarjuna Rao as Ambothula Appa Rao
- M. Balayya as Raju's father
- Subhalekha Sudhakar as Prasad, Prakash's friend
- Ananth Babu as Hotel owner
- Gautam Raju as SI
- Naamala Murthy
- Gadiraju Subba Rao
- Annuja
- Alphonsa in a special appearance in the song "Lallaguda Mallesha"
- Priya as Subbalakshmi's friend
- Ragini as Radha
- Neelima
- Dubbing Janaki as Subbalakshmi's mother

== Music ==
Dongaata

Film score by Bharadwaj
- Released: 1997
- Recorded: 1997
- Genre: Soundtrack
- Length: 24:27
- Label: Supreme Music
- Producer: Bharadwaj

Bharadwaj chronology
Merupu (1996)	Dongaata (1997)	Oka Chinna Maata (1997)

The music was composed by Bharadwaj and released on the Supreme Music Company.

No.	Title	Lyrics	Singer(s)	Length
1.	"Chilipi Chirugali"	Sirivennela Sitarama Sastry	S. P. Balasubrahmanyam, Chitra	5:03
2.	"O Chilakaa Raa"	Bhuvanachandra	Chitra	4:33
3.	"O Priya Edo Tamasha"	Bhuvanachandra	Mano, Anuradha Sriram	4:49
4.	"Lallaguda Mallesha"	Sahithi	Mano, Malgudi Subha, Swarnalatha	5:03
5.	"Swapnala Venta"	Sirivennela Sitarama Sastry	S. P. Balasubrahmanyam	4:59
Total length:				24:27

== Reception ==
The film was reviewed by Zamin Ryot. A critic from Andhra Today said that "The movie has many drawbacks and instead of covering them up, the director harped on them, and made the movie drag and boring".
