= Mr & Mrs Sailaja Krishnamurthy =

- DVD cover
- Directed by: Siva Nageswara Rao
- Written by: Gopimohan (dialogues)
- Screenplay by: Siva Nageswara Rao
- Story by: Lakshmi Productions Unit
- Produced by: Atluri Purnachandra Rao
- Starring: Sivaji; Laila
- Cinematography: Jaya Krishna Gummadi
- Edited by: Gowtham Raju
- Music by: Rohit Raj
- Release date: 22 October 2004
- Country: India
- Language: Telugu

Mr & Mrs Sailaja Krishnamurthy is a 2004 Indian Telugu-language romantic drama film which stars Sivaji and Laila. This film was directed by director Siva Nageswara Rao. The film was a box office success.

== Plot ==
Krishna Murthy is an atheist who travels to Annavaram on the severe insistence of his aunt. Sailaja is an extremely religious girl who wants to go to USA for further studies. She is also traveling to Annavaram to get blessings of Lord Satyanarayana. Krishna Murthy and Sailaja happen to share the same Berth in the train. When they arrive at Annavaram, they are forced to share the same room as husband and wife (Mr. & Mrs Sailaja Krishna Murthy) due to the local room-allotment rules.

Due to certain incident, Sailaja and Krishna Murthy get separated in Annavaram. Each one of them do not know whereabouts of other person. Sailaja and Krishna Murthy realize that they had fallen in love. They start searching for each other in Hyderabad city. The rest of the story is all about how they find each other.

== Cast ==
- Sivaji as Krishnamurthy
- Laila as Sailaja
- Krishna Bhagavan as Venkatachalam aka Guide Dev Anandam
- Dharmavarapu Subramanyam as Bhale Rao from Buchireddypalem
- L. B. Sriram as Bus Driver
- Ramaprabha as Krishnamurthy's aunt
- Tanikella Bharani as Sailaja's uncle
- Duvvasi Mohan as Auto Driver Yadagiri
- Brahmanandam as Markandeyalu
- Giri Babu as Krishnamurthy's boss
- Raghu Babu as Raghuram
- Sony Raj as Yamini
- Satyam Rajesh as Raju
- Banerjee as Sailaja's brother
- Hema as Sailaja's sister-in-law
- AVS as an irritated passenger on the train
- Kondavalasa
- Jenny as Hotel Receptionist
- Abhinayashree as Nagamani in the song "Nachinode Nagarjuna" (special appearance)

== Production ==
This was Siva Nageswara Rao's first youth love story and he felt that the producer did not properly promote it.

== Soundtrack ==
The soundtrack of the film was composed by Rohit Raj.

Track listing
No.	Title	Lyrics	Singer(s)	Length
1.	"Ammai Manasante"	Suddala Ashok Teja	Sujatha Mohan	4:46
2.	"Asale Chalikalam"	Suddala Ashok Teja	Tippu, Kalpana	4:22
3.	"Dhinak Dhin Dhillole"	Viswa	Devan	4:53
4.	"Nachinode Nagarjuna"	Chandrabose	Malathi	4:18
5.	"Namanase Ninnekorindiga"	Chinni Charan	Tippu, Ganga	5:10
6.	"Oho Chandamama"	Chinni Charan	Sujatha Mohan	4:51
Total length:				28:20

== Reception ==
A critic from Idlebrain.com wrote that "First half of the film is decent and second half is a bit slow. The plus points of the film are Sivaji, music and decent handling of subject. The minus point is the oft repeated story".
