= Chaitanya Krishna =

Indian actor

- Born: India
- Occupation: Actor
- Years active: 2009–present

Chaitanya Krishna is an Indian actor who works in Telugu cinema.

== Career ==
After finishing his engineering from Sagi Rama Krishna Raju Engineering College (Bhimavaram), he worked in a MNC as a software engineer. His love towards acting made him quit his job and then he participated in the first edition of Dhee Ultimate Dance Show. He soon secured his first lead role in Ninnu Kalisaka in 2009 and since then has acted in several Telugu films. He is known for his roles in Sneha Geetham (2010), Ala Modalaindi (2011), Rowthiram (2011), and Kaalicharan (2013). One of his short films, Peek-a-boo (2014), directed by Srinu Pandranki, was selected to be featured in Cannes "Short Film Corner" 2014.

== Filmography ==
=== Films ===
- All films are in Telugu, unless otherwise noted.

List of films and roles
Year	Title	Role	Notes
2009	Ninnu Kalisaka	Chandu	
2010	Sneha Geetham	Krishna	
2010	Adi Nuvve	Ravi	
2011	Rowthiram	Guna	Tamil film
2011	Ala Modalaindi	Deepak	
2011	Thokkalo Love Story	Kamesh	Short film
2011	Vesham	Raju	Short film
2012	Vennela 1 1/2	Krishna Krishna	
2012	i Square	Chaitu	Short film
2013	Kaalicharan	Kaalicharan	
2014	Chandamama Kathalu	Raghu	
2014	Drushyam	Rajesh	
2014	Chakkiligintha	Rahul	
2014	Peek-a-boo		Short film
2015	Ladies & Gentlemen	Krishna Murthy	
2015	Krishnamma Kalipindi Iddarini	Krishna's collage mate	
2015	S/O Satyamurthy	Lakshmi's brother	
2015	Bhale Manchi Roju	Surya	
2016	Nenu Sailaja	Vijaya Krishna	
2016	Speedunnodu	Madhan	
2016	Garam	Ravi	
2016	Premam	Siva	
2017	Katamarayudu	Katamarayudu's brother	
2018	Agnyaathavaasi	Rohit	
2018	Bluff Master	Nandu	
2019	George Reddy	Kaushik	
2019	Sarileru Neekevvaru	Journalist	
2020	Johaar	Vijay Varma	
2020	Anaganaga O Athidhi	Sreenivas	
2021	Check	Chess Player	
2021	Vakeel Saab	Satyadev's friend	
2023	Amigos	Sathi's doppelgänger	
2023	Mangalavaaram	Zamindaar	
2025	Game Changer	Ram’s friend	
2026	Nawab Cafe		
2026	Maa Inti Bangaaram	Sharath	

=== Television ===
Year	Title	Role	Network	Notes
2018-20	Ee Office Lo	Sidhu	Viu	2 Seasons
2022	Gaalivana	Marthand	ZEE5	
2023	Vyooham	Micheal	Amazon Prime Video	
2023–present	Save the Tigers	Vikram	Disney+ Hotstar	
