= Kerala State Film Award for Best Art Director =

Annual Indian film award

The Kerala State Film Award for Best Art Director is an award presented annually at the Kerala State Film Awards of India.

The recipients over the years have been:

No	Year	Art Director	Film
1	1971	R. B. Mani	
2	1972	Devadathan	Swayamvaram
3	1973	Surendran	
4	1974	K. M. Vasudevan Namboothiri	Utharayanam
5	1975	Bharathan	Prayanam
6	1976	I. V. Sasi	Anubhavam
7	1977	N.Sivan	Kodiyettam
8	1978	C.N.Karunakaran	Aswadhama
9	1979	Bharathan	
10	1980	Bharathan, Padmanabhan	
11	1981	Bharathan	Chatta
12	1982	Bharathan	Ormakkayi
13	1983	I.V.Sateesh Babu	Aaroodam
14	1984	Bharathan	Ithiripoove Chuvannapoove
15	1985	Jayasingh	
16	1986	K.Sheker	Onnu Muthal Poojyam Vare
17	1987	P. Krishnamoorthy	Swathi Thirunal
18	1988	P. Krishnamoorthy	Vaishali
19	1989	P. Krishnamoorthy	Oru Vadakkan Veeragatha, Vachanam
20	1990	Rajeev Anjal	Njan Gandharvan
21	1991	Thotta Tharani	Abhimanyu
22	1992	Mani Suchitra	Vietnam Colony
23	1993	P. Krishnamoorthy	Ghazal
24	1994	Sabu Cyril	Thenmavin Kombath
25	1995	Sabu Cyril	Kalapani
26	1996	P. Krishnamoorthy	Kulam
27	1997	Muthuraj	Guru
28	1998	Samir Chanda	Daya
29	1999	Murukan Shadoos	Irushi Vamsam
30	2000	A V Gokuldas (Art Director)	Sayahnam
31	2001	Shaji Raghavan	Kanappurangal
32	2002	Suresh Kollam	Nammal
33	2003	Baava	Mullavalliyum Thenmavum, C.I.D. Moosa
34	2004	Raja Unnithan	Akale
35	2005	Sunil Babu	Anandabhadram
36	2006	A V Gokuldas (Art Director)	Tanthra
37	2007	Rajasekharan_Parameswaran	Naalu Pennungal
38	2008	Manu Jagat	Calcutta News
39	2009	Muthuraj	Pazhassi Raja
40	2011	Sujith	Naayika
41	2012	Suresh Kollam	Celluloid
42	2013	M. Bawa	Amen
43	2014	Indulal Kaveedu	Njan Ninnodukoodeyundu
45	2015	Jayashree Laxmi Narayanan	Charlie
46	2016	A V Gokuldas (Art Director) and S Nagaraj	Kammatipaadam
47	2017	Santhosh Raman	Take Off
48	2018	Vinesh Banglan	Kammara Sambhavam
49	2019	Jothish Shankar	Kumbalangi Nights, Android Kunjappan Version 5.25
50	2020	Santosh Raman	Malik, Pyali
51	2021	Gokuldas A.V	Thuramukham
52	2022	Jothish Shankar	Nna Thaan Case Kodu
53	2023	Mohandas	2018 - Everyone is a Hero
54	2024	Ajayan Chalissey	Manjummel Boys
