= Tamil Nadu State Film Award for Best Costume Designer =

Indian film award

The Tamil Nadu State Film Award for Best Costume Designer is given by the state government as part of its annual Tamil Nadu State Film Awards for Tamil-language (Kollywood) films.

== The list ==
Here is a list of the award recipients and the films for which they won.

Year	Costume Designer	Film
2015	Vasuki Bhaskar	Maya
2014	Selvam	Kaaviya Thalaivan
2013	Sakunthala Rajasekar	Ramanujan
2012	Gautami	Vishwaroopam
2011	Swetha Srinivas	Ko
2010	Natraj	Kalavani
2009	Nalini Sriram	Ayan
2008	Ravindran	Pirivom Santhippom
2007	Anu Vardhan	Billa
2006	Ravi	Imsai Arasan 23m Pulikesi
2005	Rukmini Krishnan	Sringaram
2004		
2003		
2002	S. Rajendran	Anbe Sivam
2001	Sai	Poovellam Un Vasam, Thavasi
2000	P. Krishnamoorthy	Bharathi
1999	Renuga Vasanth	Poovellam Kettuppar
1998	Kasi	Jeans
1997	Kumar	Devathai
1996	Maasanam	Kadhal Kottai

== See also ==
- Tamil cinema
- Cinema of India
