= P. Krishnamoorthy =

Indian film art director (1943–2020)

- Born: 8 September 1943; Poompuhar, Tamil Nadu, India
- Died: 13 December 2020 (aged 77); Chennai, Tamil Nadu, India
- Education: Graduation from Government College of Fine Arts, Chennai
- Alma mater: Madras College of Arts (1960–1965)
- Occupations: Artist, art director, production designer, costume designer
- Years active: 1965–2014
- Awards: National Film Award for Best Production Design; National Film Award for Best Costume Design; Tamil Nadu State Film Award for Best Art Director; Tamil Nadu State Film Award for Best Costume Designer; Kerala State Film Award for Best Art Director

P. Krishnamoorthy (8 September 1943 – 13 December 2020) was an Indian film art director, production designer and costume designer who worked predominantly in the South Indian cinema. As of 2015, he had worked in over 55 films in Kannada, Tamil, Telugu, Sanskrit, Malayalam and English, and won five National Film Awards—three for Best Art Direction and two for Best Costume Design. In addition, he was the recipient of five Kerala State Film Awards and four Tamil Nadu State Film Awards.

== Biography ==
Hailing from Poompuhar, Tamil Nadu, P. Krishnamoorthy graduated from the Government College of Fine Arts, Chennai. Starting his profession as an artist, he got into films through G. V. Iyer. He first met Iyer in 1968 when the latter was about to make Hamsa Geethe, a Kannada film. Krishnamoorthy was immediately signed up despite having no prior experience in art direction. The film eventually released in 1975, but he remained unnoticed. However, he got an opportunity to work in plays for B. V. Karanth and Bansi Kaul.

Over the next years, Krishnamoorthy continued to mainly work for Iyer in films such as Adi Shankaracharya (1983), Madhvacharya (1986) and Ramanujacharya (1989). Although he entered Tamil cinema through Sreedhar Rajan's Kann Sivanthaal Mann Sivakkum in 1983, he did not work in Tamil films for a brief phase in his career. In 1987, he won his first National Film Award for Madhvacharya. This recognition helped him enter Malayalam cinema, through Lenin Rajendran's Swathi Thirunal (1987). Following that, he continued to work in 15 films in Malayalam including Vaisali (1988), Oru Vadakkan Veeragatha (1989), Perumthachan (1991). He won two National Film Awards for his work in Oru Vadakkan Veeragatha as an art director and costume designer. His involvement with Malayalam cinema in the late 1980s and early 1990s earned him five Kerala State Film Awards for Best Art Director.

In 1991, Krishnamoorthy made a comeback to Tamil cinema through Bharathiraja's Nadodi Thendral. This was followed by Balu Mahendra's Vanna Vanna Pookkal (1992). In the subsequent years, he would work on more Tamil films including Suhasini Maniratnam's directorial debut Indira (1996), Sangamam (1999) and Bharati (2001). Bharati fetched him two National Film Awards: Best Art Direction and Best Costume Design. His other Tamil films include Imsai Arasan 23rd Pulikecei (2006), for which he won a state award, Naan Kadavul (2009) and Ramanujan (2014).

As of 2012, Krishnamoorthy lived in Mahabalipuram, Tamil Nadu.

== Death ==
Krishnamoorthy passed away in Chennai on 13 December 2020, due to age related ailments.

== Awards ==
- National Film Award for Best Production Design - 1986, 1989, 2000.
- National Film Award for Best Costume Design - 1989, 2000.
- Tamil Nadu State Film Award for Best Art Director - 1999, 2000, 2006.
- Tamil Nadu State Film Award for Best Costume Designer - 2000.
- Kerala State Film Award for Best Art Director - 1987, 1988, 1989, 1993, 1996.
- Kalaimamani Award - 2007

== Selected filmography ==
- Hamsageethe (1975)
- Kudre Motte (1975)
- Prema Kama (1976)
- Rishyashringa (1977)
- Nalegalannu Maduvavaru (1978)
- Kaadu Kudure (1979)
- Kann Sivanthaal Mann Sivakkum (1983)
- Adi Shankaracharya (1983)
- Karthavya (1985)
- Madhvacharya (1986)
- Ithihasa (1986)
- Swathi Thirunal (1987)
- Vaisali (1988)
- Ramanujacharya (1989)
- Oru Vadakkan Veeragatha (1989)
- Wall Poster (1989)
- Hrudayanjali (1990)
- Vachanam (1990)
- Nilapennai (1990)
- Oliyampukal
- Pooram
- Nadodi Thendral (1991)
- Perumthachan (1991)
- Vanna Vanna Pookkal (1992)
- Rajasilpi (1989)
- Praying with Anger (1992)
- Ghazal (1993)
- Aathma (1993)
- Bhagavad Gita: Song of the Lord (1993)
- Parinayam (1994)
- Pasumpon (1995)
- Mogamul (1995)
- Indira (1995)
- Maharaja (1996)
- Tamizh Selvan (1996)
- Kulam (1996)
- Sangamam (1999)
- Thaj Mahal (1999)
- Thenali (2000)
- Kutty (2000)
- Vaanavil (2000)
- Pavazhakkodi (2001)
- Pandavar Bhoomi (2001)
- Azhagi (2001)
- Bharathi (2001)
- Thenral (2002)
- Julie Ganapathi (2003)
- Athu (2004)
- Pasakkilikal (2005)
- Imsai Arasan 23rd Pulikecei (2006)
- Thuvanam (2006)
- Naan Kadavul (2009)
- Padithurai
- Jaganmohini (2009)
- Ramanujan (2014)
