= Thota Tharani =

Indian art director and designer

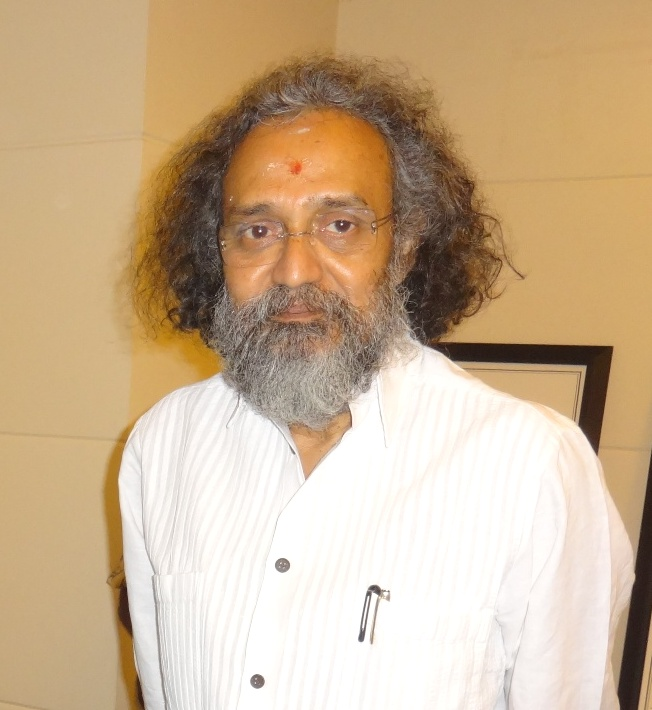
- Thota Tharani in 2014
- Born: 16 December 1949 (age 76); Madras, Tamil Nadu, India
- Education: American College, Madurai; Government College of Fine Arts, Chennai; Royal College of Art, London
- Occupations: Art Director; Production designer
- Years active: 1978-present
- Spouse: Sharada
- Children: 1
- Awards: Kalaimamani Award (1998) Padma Shri (2001)

Thota Tharani is an Indian art director, production designer and painter known for his work in Tamil, Telugu, Malayalam and Hindi cinema. He is recognized for his detailed set designs and visual storytelling.

He has received numerous accolades, including two National Film Awards, four Tamil Nadu State Film Awards, three Nandi Awards, two Filmfare Awards South, and a Kerala State Film Award. In 2001, he was honoured with the Padma Shri by the Government of India for his contributions to art. Tharani's work extends to paintings, murals, paper collages, wooden montages, and installations.

== Background ==
Thota Tharani was born into a Telugu speaking family with strong ties to the arts as the second of eight children. His father, Thota Venkateswara Rao, was a well-known art director who worked on over 100 films, including Jayasimha (1955) and Panduranga Mahatyam (1957). Originally from Machilipatnam, Andhra Pradesh, Venkateswara Rao started as a drama and film actor, playing female roles, before moving to Madras (now Chennai) to work as an assistant art director under Sudhansu Roy and A. K. Sekar.

== Early life ==
Tharani’s interest in art emerged early in his childhood in Madras. He spent much of his time drawing with chalk on the floors of his home, and his father encouraged his talent by providing him with drawing books. Tharani pursued formal art education, earning a Graduate Diploma in Mural Painting in 1971 and subsequently a Post Graduate Diploma in Fine Arts (Painting) from the Government College of Fine Arts, Chennai. He was later offered a fellowship from the Government of France to study printmaking. Additionally, he completed print making courses from the Royal College of Art, London.

== Career ==
=== Film career ===
Thota Tharani

began his independent career in the film industry as a set designer for the Telugu film Nagamalli. He quickly gained recognition for his exceptional work, creating realistic and larger-than-life sets for films across various Indian languages, including Telugu, Tamil, Hindi, and Malayalam. Tharani has worked on over 200 films, including foreign productions such as Pondichéry, dernier comptoir des Indes (French), Hanuman (French) and Branchie (Italian).

Some of his most notable contributions include the recreation of the Madurai Meenakshi Temple for the Telugu film Arjun (2004), the glass set for the song "Sahana" in Sivaji: The Boss (2007), and the realistic set of the Dharavi slums for Nayagan (1987). Tharani also created the Babylonian-inspired backdrop for the song "Vaji Vaji" in Sivaji: The Boss, and the set for the mythological Indralok in Indiralohathil Na Azhagappan (2008).

Tharani's work extends beyond film. In 2010, he was commissioned to create an artificial dome for the Tamil Nadu Assembly complex, which was completed in 12 days with the help of over 500 workers. Tharani's expertise in both realistic and imaginative set design has earned him multiple accolades, including the National Film Award for Best Art Direction and the Padma Shri, awarded in 2001.

Throughout his career, Tharani has been known for his resourceful approach to set design, often creating elaborate effects on a limited budget. He has worked on several films where he recreated expensive materials, such as marble, using cost-effective alternatives that still maintained a high visual quality. This earned him a reputation as a "producers' man," valued for his ability to deliver outstanding work within budgetary constraints.

=== Artistic work ===
Beyond films, Tharani is also a painter and artist. His ink-on-paper artworks are typically non-figurative. He has also experimented with calligraphy as a creative form of expression. One of his most renowned series is the Script Series, inspired by the alphabets of various languages, with letters intertwining to form abstract designs. In addition to this, Tharani is celebrated for his paintings of gods, goddesses, and Rajput figures.

Tharani has participated in several prestigious workshops and exhibitions both in India and abroad. In 1992, he was part of the Design Symposium at the Crafts Festival Living in Seasons in Toyama, Japan. He also took part in printmaking workshops at the British Council in Chennai and Atelier 17 in Paris. Additionally, he participated in a Fresco Painting camp in Rajasthan and a graphic workshop at Garhi Village in New Delhi.

Tharani's work has been showcased in various international exhibitions, including the Kanagawa International Print Exhibition in 1983 and the III & IV Mini Prints Biennale in Barcelona in 1983 and 1984. His works have been displayed in Paris, Bordeaux, Vienna, Yugoslavia, and Germany. His awards include recognitions from the Mysore Dasara Art Exhibition, Mysore Pradesh Chitrakala Parishad in Bangalore, and the Regional Lalit Kala Akademi for Graphic Prints.

== Working style and influences ==
Thota Tharani is known for his fast-paced working style. He focuses on key scenes, asking for the beginning, middle, and end of the script rather than reading it in full, allowing him to concentrate on specific moments with precision and creativity.

Tharani admires the work of Indian art directors Madhavapeddi Gokhale, Soorapaneni Kaladhar, and Ganga. Internationally, he draws inspiration from Ken Adam, known for his work on early James Bond films, and Cedric Gibbons, whose designs for The Wizard of Oz (1939) left a lasting impression on him.

== Awards ==
Tiltles and honours

- 1998 – Kalaimamani Award
- 2001 – Padma Shri
- 2010 – Honorary doctorate (D.Litt) from Sathyabama University

National Film Award for Best Art Direction

- 1987 – Nayakan
- 1996 – Indian

Nandi Award for Best Art Director

- 1983 – Sagara Sangamam
- 1989 – Geethanjali
- 2004 – Arjun

Kerala State Film Award for Best Art Director

- 1991 – Abhimanyu

Tamil Nadu State Film Award for Best Art Director

- 1991 – Thalapathi
- 1994 – Kaadhalan
- 2005 – Chandramukhi
- 2007 – Sivaji, Sringaram

Vijay Award for Best Art Director

- 2007 – Sivaji
- 2008 – Dasavathaaram

Filmfare Award for Best Art Direction

- 2024 - Ponniyin Selvan: II
- 1998 - Choodalani Vundi

== Filmography ==
Key
†	Denotes films that have not yet been released

Year	Film	Language	Notes
1978	Sommokadidhi Sokokadidhi	Telugu	
1981	Raja Paarvai	Tamil	
1982	Subhalekha	Telugu	
1983	Pallavi Anu Pallavi	Kannada	
1983	Nelavanka	Telugu	
1983	Sagara Sangamam	Telugu	
1983	Shubh Kaamna	Hindi	
1985	Anveshana	Telugu	
1986	Mouna Ragam	Tamil	
1987	Pushpaka Vimana	Silent (Kannada)	
1987	Nayakan	Tamil	
1988	Agni Natchathiram	Tamil	
1988	Sathyaa	Tamil	
1988	Solla Thudikuthu Manasu	Tamil	
1989	Indrudu Chandrudu	Telugu	
1989	Apoorva Sagodharargal	Tamil	
1989	Geethanjali	Telugu	
1989	Shiva	Telugu	
1990	Anjali	Tamil	
1990	Chatriyan	Tamil	
1990	Raja Kaiya Vacha	Tamil	
1991	Chaitanya	Telugu	
1991	Nirnayam	Telugu	
1991	Thalapathi	Tamil	
1991	Abhimanyu	Malayalam	
1992	Mannan	Tamil	
1992	Chinarayudu	Telugu	
1993	Thiruda Thiruda	Tamil	
1993	I Love India	Tamil	
1993	Valli	Tamil	
1993	Gentleman	Tamil	
1993	May Madham	Tamil	
1994	Sethupathi IPS	Tamil	
1994	Kaadhalan	Tamil	
1995	Subha Sankalpam	Telugu	
1995	Bombay	Tamil	
1996	Indian	Tamil	
1996	Kadhal Desam	Tamil	
1996	Mr. Romeo	Tamil	
1997	Ratchagan	Tamil	
1997	Minsara Kanavu	Tamil	
1998	Jeans	Tamil	
1998	Thayin Manikodi	Tamil	
1998	Choodalani Vundi	Telugu	
1999	Kadhalar Dhinam	Tamil	
1999	Vaalee	Tamil	
1999	Mudhalvan	Tamil	
2000	Mugavaree	Tamil	
2000	Kushi	Tamil	
2000	Mister Butler	Malayalam	
2001	Nayak: The Real Hero	Hindi	
2001	Virumbugiren	Tamil	
2001	12B	Tamil	
2002	Baba	Tamil	
2002	Five Star	Tamil	
2002	Samurai	Tamil	
2002	Run	Tamil	
2002	Gemini	Tamil	
2002	Bokshu – The Myth	English	
2003	Okkadu	Telugu	
2003	Priyamaana Thozhi	Tamil	
2003	Jism	Hindi	
2004	Arjun	Telugu	
2004	Gambeeram	Tamil	
2004	Mass	Telugu	
2005	Athadu	Telugu	
2005	Sachein	Tamil	
2005	Chandramukhi	Tamil	
2005	Kanda Naal Mudhal	Tamil	
2005	Ullam Ketkumae	Tamil	
2006	Uyir	Tamil	
2006	Thirupathi	Tamil	
2006	Varalaru	Tamil	
2007	Sivaji	Tamil	
2007	Sringaram	Tamil	
2008	Dasavathaaram	Tamil	
2008	Sathyam	Tamil	
2008	Dhaam Dhoom	Tamil	
2008	Kuselan	Tamil	
2009	Ananda Tandavam	Tamil	
2009	Kanthaswamy	Tamil	
2010	Leader	Telugu	
2011	Dam 999	English	
2012	Life is Beautiful	Telugu	
2012	Adios	Silent	Short film
2014	On A Quest	English	Role as an older Swami Chinmayananda
2015	Rudrama Devi	Telugu	
2015	Eli	Tamil	
2016	Brahmotsavam	Telugu	
2017	Khaidi No. 150	Telugu	
2019	Nuvvu Thopu Raa	Telugu	
2022	Ponniyin Selvan: I	Tamil	
2022	Kadaisi Vivasayi	Tamil	
2022	Khudiram Bose (film)	Tamil	
2023	Ponniyin Selvan: II	Tamil	
2023	Chandramukhi 2	Tamil	
2025	Shashtipoorthi	Telugu	
2025	Kuberaa	Telugu	Bilingual; also shot in Tamil
2025	Meghalu Cheppina Prema Katha	Telugu	
2025	Hari Hara Veera Mallu	Telugu	
2025	Ghaati	Telugu	
