= A. V. Gokuldas =

Indian production designer

- Born: 31 May 1972 (age 54); Ambalapuram, Thrissur, India
- Education: Diploma in Fine Arts College of Fine Arts, Thrissur
- Occupation: Art director
- Years active: 2000–present
- Known for: Production design
- Notable work: Classmates, Keerthi Chakra, Ayalum Njanum Thammil, Kadha parayumbol, Kammatipaadam, Jallikattu, Churuli, Joji, Thuramukham
- Awards: Kerala State Film Award for Best Art Director (2000, 2006, 2016,2022)

A.V. Gokuldas is a production designer (Art Director) in the Indian film industry. He has won the Kerala State Film Award for Best Production Design four times.

== Early life and education ==
Gokuldas was born in Kerala and completed his schooling at Ambalapuram school and Aryampadam Sarvodaya higher secondary school. He graduated from the College of Fine Arts, Thrissur.

== Career ==
After finishing his fine arts diploma from the Government College of Fine Arts, Thrissur, instead of pursuing a career as an art director, he started assisting famous art directors Sabu Cyril and Sunil Babu for a few more years to gain expertise in his art direction career. After assisting with Sabu, he got a chance to do the art direction for the movie "Sayahnam", directed by R. Sarath, which fetched him his first Kerala State award for Best Art Direction in 2000.

== Filmography ==
Year	Film	Notes
2000	Sayahnam	
2003	Pulijanmam	
2003	Sthithi	
2006	Keerthi Chakra	
2006	Classmates	
2006	Parayam	
2006	Anthiponvettam	
2006	Kalabham	
2007	Katha Parayumpol	
2007	Pranayakalam	
2008	Minnaminnikoottam	
2008	Mulla (film)	
2008	Malabar Wedding	
2009	Neelathamara	
2010	Elsamma Enna Aankutty	
2010	Sufi Paranja Katha	
2010	Anjil Oral Arjunan	
2011	Melvilasom	
2011	Doubles (2011 film)	
2011	Teja Bhai & Family	
2011	Makaramanju	
2012	Spanish Masala	
2012	Ayalum Njanum Thammil	
2013	Tantra	
2013	Black Butterfly (2013 film)	
2013	Pattam Pole	
2013	Ezhu Sundara Rathrikal	
2013	5 Sundarikal	
2013	Pullipulikalum Aattinkuttiyum	
2014	Vikramadithyan	
2015	Ennu Ninte Moideen	
2015	Chandrettan Evideya	
2016	Kammatipaadam	
2016	Kali	
2016	Shajahanum Pareekuttiyum	
2017	Varnyathil Aashanka	
2017	Villain	
2017	Ezra	
2018	Swathanthryam Ardharathriyil	
2018	Aami	
2019	9	
2019	Allu Ramendran	
2019	Jallikkattu	
2019	Kodathi Samaksham Balan Vakeel	
2020	Churuli	
2020	Love	
2020	Anjaam Pathiraa	
2021	Kuruthi	
2021	Joji	
2021	Ajagajantharam	
2021	Aanum Pennum	
2022	Djinn	
2022	Pada	
2022	Naradan	
2022	Thallumaala	
2022	Kumari	
2022	Nanpakal Nerathu Mayakkam	
2023	Thankam	
2023	Thuramukham	
2023	Momo In Dubai	
2023	Chaaver	
2024	Abraham Ozler	
2024	Vivekanandan Viralanu	
2024	Malaikottai Vaaliban	
2024	Ajayante Randam Moshanam	
2024	Pravinkoodu Shappu	
2025	Ariku	

== Awards ==
- 2000 - Kerala State Film Award for Best Art Director - Sayahnam
- 2006 - Kerala State Film Award for Best Art Director - Thantra
- 2016 - Kerala State Film Award for Best Art Director- Kammatipaadam
- 2022 - Kerala State Film Award for Best Art Director- Thuramukham (2022 film)
