= Samir Chanda =

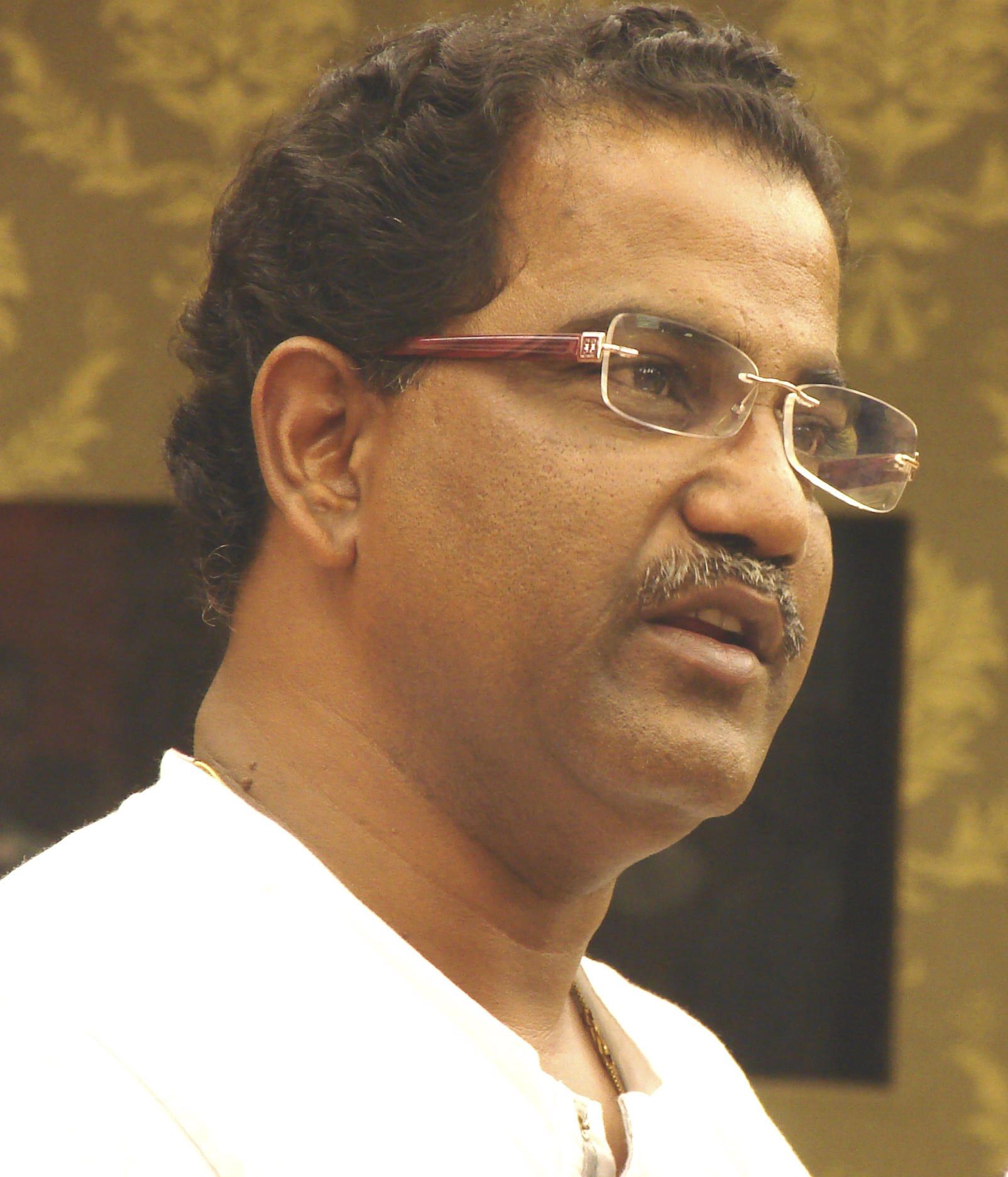
- Born: 1957; West Bengal, India
- Died: 18 August 2011 (age 53); Mumbai, Maharashtra, India
- Other names: Sameer Chanda
- Occupation(s): art director, production designer
- Years active: 1983–2011
- Spouse: Leela Chanda
- Children: Sandeepan Chanda

Samir Chanda (1957 – 18 August 2011) was an Indian art director and production designer across Indian cinema, including Hindi, Bengali, Malayalam and Tamil, most known for his work in films like Yodha (1992), Dil Se.. (1998), Guru (2007), Omkara (2006), Rang De Basanti (2006), and Raavan (2010).

He also directed a Bengali film, Ek Nadir Galpo (2008) starring Mithun Chakraborty. It was Indian entries for the Asian, African and Latin American Competition segment of the 38th International Film Festival of India (IFFI), in Goa He was awarded the National Film Award for Best Art Direction four times, including Netaji Subhas Chandra Bose: The Forgotten Hero (2005) directed by Shyam Benegal.

== Career ==
A trained painter from Government College of Art & Craft, Kolkata, he moved to Mumbai and started his career as an assistant to noted art director Nitish Roy working in films like, Mandi (1983) by Shyam Benegal, Mrinal Sen. Subsequently, started handling films independently as art director and production designer, with Subhash Ghai's Ram Lakhan (1989). Over the years he worked with directors like Shyam Benegal, Sangeeth Sivan, Vishal Bhardwaj, Rakesh Omprakash Mehra, Gautam Ghosh and Mani Ratnam.

For film Delhi-6 directed by Rakeysh Omprakash Mehra, Chanda recreated inner lanes of Old Delhi at Sambhar town in Rajasthan, as it has similar architecture. Later, for some scenes, historic Jama Masjid was digitally added to the frame as a backdrop.

Wasiq Khan, who later did Gangs of Wasseypur (2012) and Goliyon Ki Raasleela Ram-Leela (2013), started his career as an assistant art director with Chanda in films, Mani Ratnam's Iruvar (1997) and Shyam Benegal's Hari-Bhari (2000), before starting out on his own.

On the later half, he started up his own film production house named as LISAC. The root of this name stands as - LI for Lila, SA for Sami and C as Chanda. One of the eminent Film under it was the Ek Nadir Galpo: Tale of a River.

He died in Mumbai on 18 August 2011, at the age of 53. Reportedly, he suffered a drug reaction to a painkiller he had taken for a toothache earlier that day, and suffered a heart attack. He was rushed a hospital in Malad, Mumbai, where he died within an hour.

== Personal life ==
Samir Chanda was married to Leela Chanda and had a son Sandeepan Chanda and live a life of a nuclear family. His son follows his path into the film industry. Samir chanda has completed his Education from University of Calcutta and Government College of Art & Craft.

== Filmography ==
Year	Title	Note
1989	Ram Lakhan	
1992	Yodha	Malayalam film
1993	Rudaali	
1993	Gandharvam	Malayalam film
1995	Nirnayam	Malayalam film
1995	Agar Aisa Ho To	Hindi Serial
1996	Is Raat Ki Subah Nahin	Hindi film
1997	Iruvar	Tamil film
1998	Dil Se..	
1998	Daya	Malayalam film Kerala State Film Award for Best Art Director
2001	Aalavandhan/Abhay	Tamil-Hindi Bilingual film
2001	Zubeidaa	
2001	Aks	
2005	Kisna: The Warrior Poet	
2005	Mr Ya Miss	
2006	Krrish	
2006	Omkara	Filmfare Award for Best Art Direction
2006	Rang De Basanti	
2006	Kantatar	Bengali film
2006	Faltu (Bengali)	
2006	Galli Galli Sim Sim (TV series)	Hindi adaptation of Sesame Street
2007	Guru	Filmfare Award for Best Art Direction
2007	Blood Brothers (short film)	
2008	Dasavathaaram	Tamil film
2008	Welcome to Sajjanpur	
2008	Ghajini	
2009	Kaalbela	
2009	Kaminey	
2009	Delhi-6	
2009	Well Done Abba!	
2010	Raavan	
2010	Raavanan	Tamil film
2011	7 Khoon Maaf	
2015	Ek Nadir Galpo	Bengali film (Posthumous)

== Awards ==
- National Film Award
  - 1992: Best Art Direction for Rukmavati Ki Haveli
  - 1993: Best Art Direction for Rudaali
  - 2005: Best Art Direction for Netaji Subhas Chandra Bose: The Forgotten Hero
  - 2009:Best Art Direction for Delhi-6
- Filmfare Award
  - 2007: Best Art Direction for Omkara
  - 2008: Best Art Direction for Guru
