= Filmfare Award for Best Art Direction =

Annual award for Hindi films

The Filmfare Best Art Direction Award is given by the Filmfare magazine as part of its annual Filmfare Awards for Hindi films.

Although the overall awards started in 1954, the award for this category started in 1956.

== Superlatives ==
| Wins | Recipient |
|---|---|
| 3 | M. R. Acharekar, Sudhendu Roy, Shanti Das, Ajit Banerjee, Sharmishta Roy, Nitin Chandrakant Desai, Subrata Chakraborty and Amit Ray |
| 2 | S. S. Samel, Bansi Chandragupta, N. B. Kulkarni, Madhukar Shinde, Ravi Verman, Sabu Cyril, Samir Chanda, Mansi Mehta |

== Awards ==
| Year | Production Design | Film |
|---|---|---|
| 2025 | Mayur Sharma | Kill |
| 2024 | Subrata Chakraborty and Amit Ray | Sam Bahadur |
| 2023 | Subrata Chakraborty and Amit Ray | Gangubai Kathiawadi |
| 2022 | Mansi Mehta and Dmitrii Malich | Sardar Udham |
| 2021 | Mansi Mehta | Gulabo Sitabo |
| 2020 | Suzanne Caplan Merwanji | Gully Boy |
| 2019 | Nitin Zihani Choudhary, Rakesh Yadav | Tumbbad |
| 2018 | Parul Sondh | Daddy |
| 2017 | Not Awarded | Not Awarded |
| 2016 | Sujeet Sawant, Sriram Iyengar and Saloni Dhatrak | Bajirao Mastani |
| 2015 | Subrata Chakraborty and Amit Ray | Haider |
| 2014 | Acropolis Design | Bhaag Milkha Bhaag |
| 2013 | Rajat Podar | Barfi! |
| 2012 | Shashank Tere | Delhi Belly |
| 2011 | Mukund Gupta | Do Dooni Chaar |
| 2010 | Helen Jones, Sukanta Panigrahi | Dev.D |
| 2009 | Vandana Kataria, Angelica Bhowmick | Oye Lucky! Lucky Oye! |
| 2008 | Samir Chanda | Guru |
| 2007 | Samir Chanda | Omkara |
| 2006 | Keshto Mondal, Tanushree Sarkar and Pradeep Sarkar | Parineeta |
| 2005 | Sabu Cyril | Yuva |
| 2004 | Muneesh Sappel | Pinjar |
| 2003 | Nitin Chandrakant Desai | Devdas |
| 2002 | Sharmishta Roy | Kabhi Khushi Kabhie Gham |
| 2001 | Not Awarded | Not Awarded |
| 2000 | Not Awarded | Not Awarded |
| 1999 | Sharmishta Roy | Kuch Kuch Hota Hai |
| 1998 | Sharmishta Roy | Dil To Pagal Hai |
| 1997 | Nitin Chandrakant Desai | Khamoshi: The Musical |
| 1996 | Bijon Dasgupta | Prem |
| 1995 | Nitin Chandrakant Desai | 1942: A Love Story |
| 1994 | Sabu Cyril | Gardish |
| 1993 | Ravi Verman | Angaar |
| 1992 | Ravi Verman | Hum |
| 1991 | Nitish Roy | Ghayal |
| 1990 | | |
| 1989 | Liladhar S. Sawant | Hatya |
| 1988 | No Ceremony Held | No Ceremony Held |
| 1987 | No Ceremony Held | No Ceremony Held |
| 1986 | Suresh J. Sawant | Ram Teri Ganga Maili |
| 1985 | Madhukar Shinde | Saaransh |
| 1984 | N. B. Kulkarni | Razia Sultan |
| 1983 | Ajit Banerjee | Namkeen |
| 1982 | Bansi Chandragupta | Chakra |
| 1981 | C. S. Bhati | Aakrosh |
| 1980 | Madhukar Shinde | Lahu Ke Do Rang |
| 1979 | T. K. Desai | Des Pardes |
| 1978 | Shanti Das | Hum Kisise Kum Naheen |
| 1977 | S. S. Samel | Fakira |
| 1976 | Bansi Chandragupta | Do Jhoot |
| 1975 | Sudhendu Roy | Sagina |
| 1974 | A. Rangaraj | Bobby |
| 1973 | N. B. Kulkarni | Pakeezah |
| 1972 | Bansi Chandragupta | Seema |
| 1971 | Shanti Das | Talash |
| 1970 | Ajit Banerjee | Anokhi Raat |
| 1969 | Ajit Banerjee | Majhli Didi |
| 1968 | H. V. Maharudria | Taqdeer |
| 1967 | Sant Singh | Yeh Raat Phir Na Aayegi |
| 1966 | M. S. Sathyu (Black & White); S. S. Samel (Color); Shanti Das | Haqeeqat; Gumnaam; Phool Aur Patthar |
| 1965 | G. L. Yadhav & T. K. Desai (Black & White); Sant Singh (Color) | Kohra; Jahan Ara |
| 1964 | Sudhendu Roy | Mere Mehboob |
| 1963 | D. R. Jadhav & Ram Yedekar | Son Of India |
| 1962 | M. R. Acharekar | Jis Desh Men Ganga Behti Hai |
| 1961 | Biren Nag | Chaudhvin Ka Chand |
| 1960 | M. R. Acharekar | Kaagaz Ke Phool |
| 1959 | Sudhendu Roy | Madhumati |
| 1958 | M. R. Acharekar | Pardesi |
| 1957 | Kanu Desai | Jhanak Jhanak Payal Baaje |
| 1956 | Rusi Banker | Mirza Ghalib |

== See also ==
- Filmfare Awards
- Bollywood
- Cinema of India
