= B. Arundhathi =

Indian playback singer

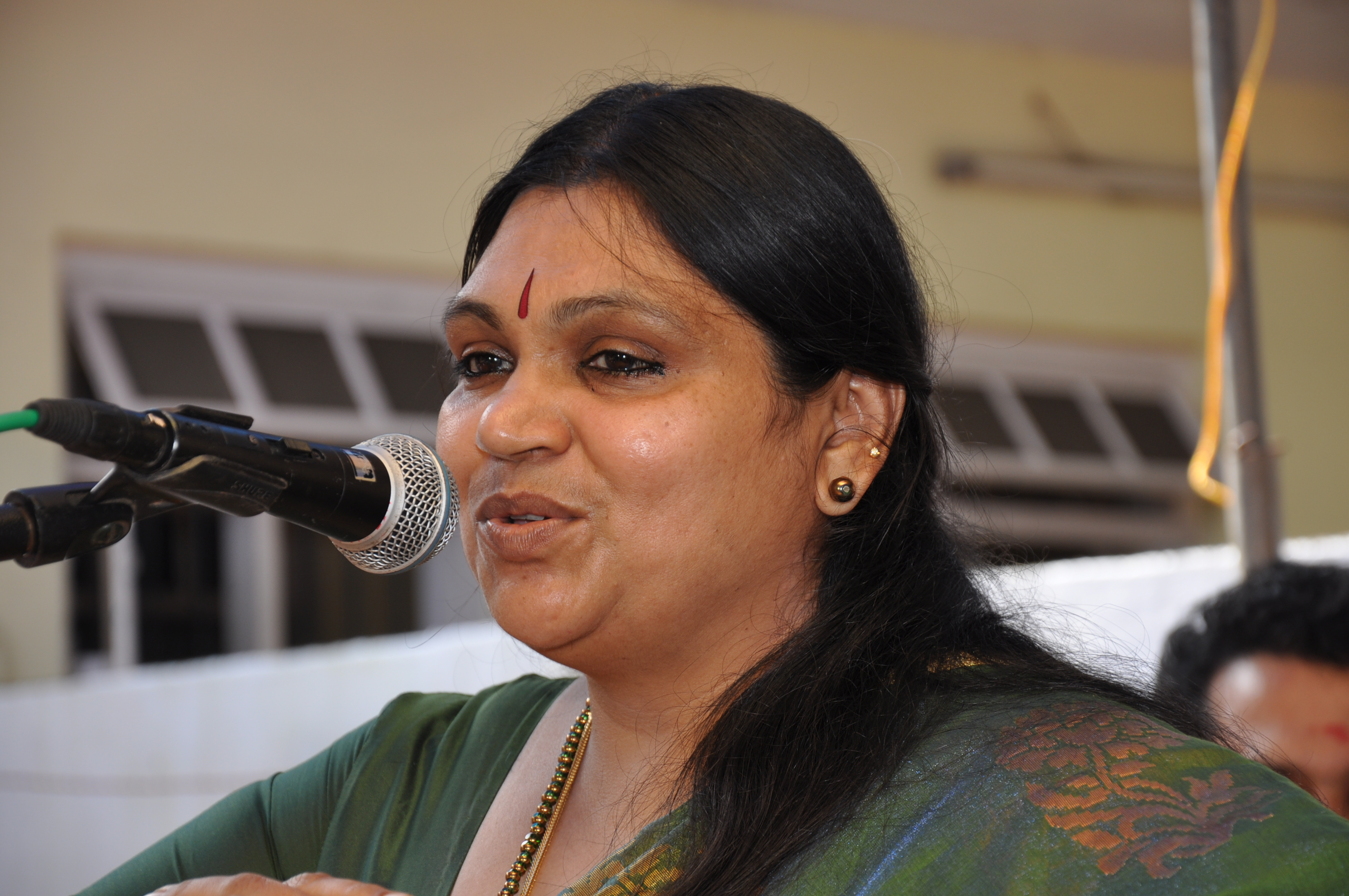
- B. Arundhathi

Background information
- Born: B. Arundhathi; 1958 (age 67–68)
- Genres: Playback singing, Carnatic music
- Occupation: Singer
- Instrument: Vocals
- Years active: 1981–present

B. Arundhathi is a playback singer and Indian classical music vocalist. She has sung many songs in Malayalam, Tamil and Telugu films, predominantly in Malayalam films. The famous Malayalam song "Ethra Pookalam" is sung by her. She is widely popular for her versatility in singing both carnatic music and light music equally well. She is a recipient of the Kerala Sangeetha Nataka Akademi Award in the Light Music category (2009).

== Family ==
She is married to Mr. T. S. Hariharan, who is a Retired bank officer and has two children. Her elder daughter Charu Hariharan is mastered in psychology and plays mridangam very well. Charu has band "Varldens Band" based at Sweden along with some International musicians. Charu is also a Playback Singer - "Thotte Thotteduthe" (Venal Maram) 2009, "Sunday Sooriyan" (Ivar Vivahitharayal) 2009, "Mizhiyoram" (Yaakshi Yours faithfully) 2012, "Illimulam" (Iniyum Ethra Dooram) 2016, lyricist - song "My Heart" (Chattakkari) 2012 and music composer - album "Moodi Thirandidum", Songs "Nimishame", "Vinmeghamaay" & "Varmathiye" (Movie - Oru Karibbean Udayippu) 2019. Her younger son Sreekanth Hariharan is a violinist and a Playback Singer - Songs - "Unakaga" (Movie: Bigil), "Aazhi Soozhnda (Sivappu, Manjal, Pachai), Uthira Uthira (Ponmanickavel), "Neengalum OOrum (Genius), "Pularmanju" (Iniyum Ethra Dooram), "Doore Dooreya" (Neeharika).

== Discography (Film) ==
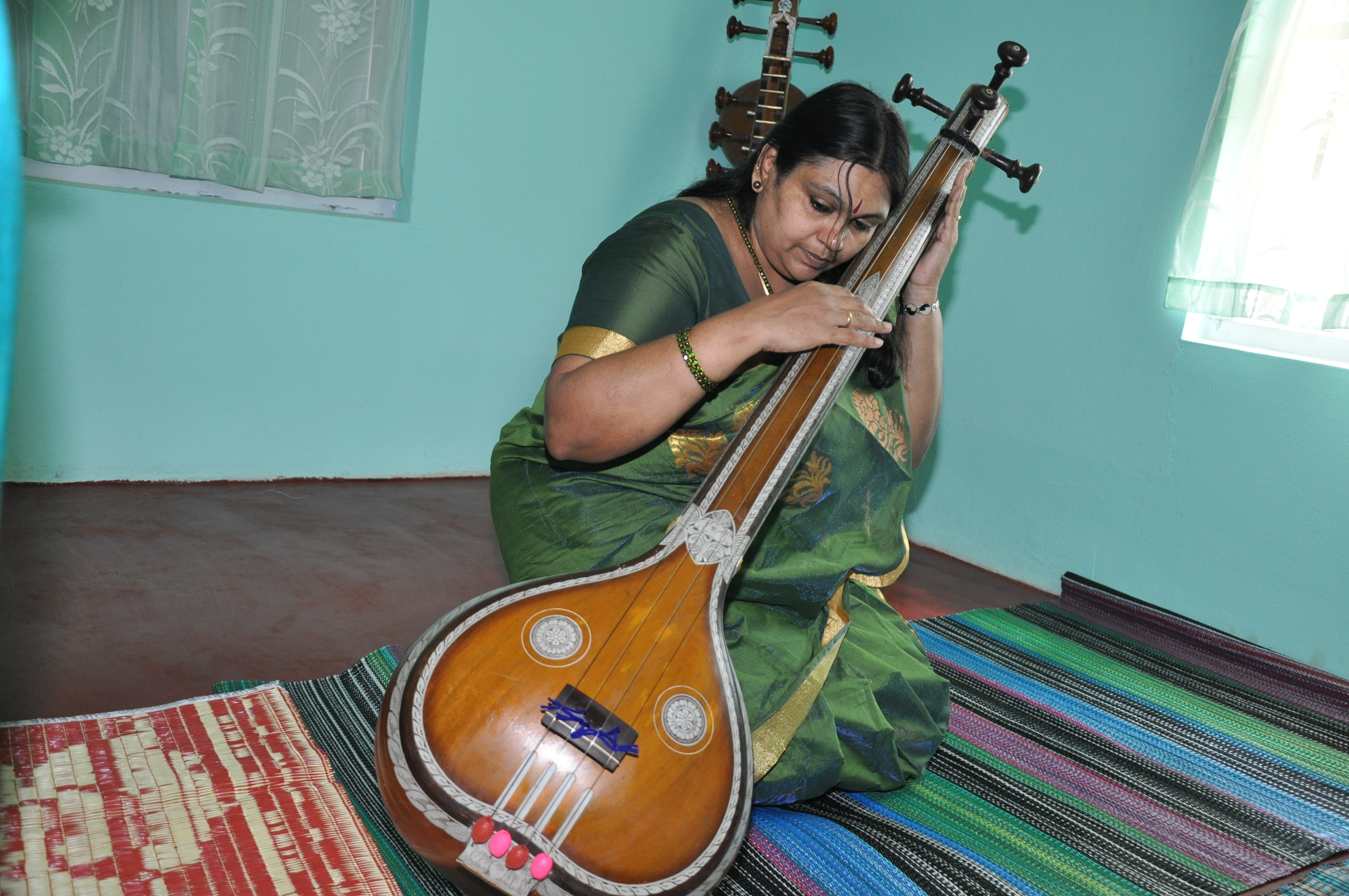
:B Arundathy

- Note: (D) indicates dubbing

Year	Song	Film	Composer	Language	Co-singer	Notes
1982	Arikilo Akaleyo	Novemberinte Nashtam	M. G. Radhakrishnan	Malayalam	-	
1982	Ambaadi Onnunden	Swantham Ennu Karuthi	M. K. Arjunan	Malayalam	-	
1986	Kiliye Kiliye	Dheem Tharikida Thom	M. G. Radhakrishnan	Malayalam	M. G. Sreekumar	
1986	Mandarangalellam	Dheem Tharikida Thom	M. G. Radhakrishnan	Malayalam	K. J. Yesudas	
1986	Ethra Pookkalamini	Rakkuyilin Ragasadassil	M. G. Radhakrishnan	Malayalam	-	
1986	Gopalaka Pahimam	Rakkuyilin Ragasadassil	M. G. Radhakrishnan	Malayalam	-	
1986	Valli Thirumanam	Rakkuyilin Ragasadassil	M. G. Radhakrishnan	Malayalam	-	
1986	Ee Raavilo	Ponnum Kudathinum Pottu	Shyam	Malayalam	-	
1987	Alarsara Parithapam	Swathi Thirunal	Swathi Thirunal, M. B. Sreenivasan	Malayalam	-	
1987	Sumasayaka	Swathi Thirunal	Swathi Thirunal, M. B. Sreenivasan	Malayalam	-	
1987	Omana Thinkal	Swathi Thirunal	Irayimman Thampi, M. B. Sreenivasan	Malayalam	-	
1987	Prananathan	Swathi Thirunal	Irayimman Thampi, M. B. Sreenivasan	Malayalam	-	
1988	Onnanam Malamukalil	Puravrutham	Kavalam Narayana Panicker	Malayalam	-	
1988	Chaithram Innale	Deergha Sumangali Bhava	Mohan Sithara	Malayalam	-	
1989	Swapnamalini	Devadas	K. Raghavan	Malayalam	-	
1989	Aalthirakkilum	Utharam	Vidyadharan	Malayalam	-	
1989	Manjin Vilolamaam	Utharam	Vidyadharan	Malayalam	-	
1989	Ninnil Asooyayarnnu	Utharam	Vidyadharan	Malayalam	-	
1989	Swaramidarathe	Utharam	Vidyadharan	Malayalam	-	
1989	Snehikkunnu Njaan	Utharam	Vidyadharan	Malayalam	-	
1989	Manikkaveenayil	Pooram	M. G. Radhakrishnan	Malayalam	-	
1989	Kanneerkili	Pooram	M. G. Radhakrishnan	Malayalam	-	
1989	Kaadinee Kaadathamenthe	Pooram	M. G. Radhakrishnan	Malayalam	-	
1989	Piriyaano Thammil	Pooram	M. G. Radhakrishnan	Malayalam	-	
1991	Daaruka Nigraha	Oru Prathyeka Ariyippu	A Sanil	Malayalam	-	
1991	Chellappoove Nin Chundil	Kadamkadha	Aji Sharas	Malayalam	-	
1993	Medaponnaniyum	Devaasuram	M. G. Radhakrishnan	Malayalam	-	
1993	Namasthethu	Devaasuram	M. G. Radhakrishnan	Malayalam	-	
1993	Kaattum Kadalum	Ottayadipathakal	Mohan Sithara	Malayalam	-	
1993	Ellarkkum Kittiya Sammanam	Aayirappara	Raveendran	Malayalam	-	
1993	Yaathrayay	Aayirappara	Raveendran	Malayalam	K. J. Yesudas	
1995	Devaraga Doothike	Kaakkakkum Poochakkum Kalyanam	Raveendran	Malayalam	-	
1996	Entharo Mahanu	Devaraagam	Tyagaraja, M. M. Keeravani	Malayalam	-	
1996	Maarivil Poonkuyile	Hitler (1996 film)	S. P. Venkatesh	Malayalam	-	
1996	Kalahamsam Neenthum Raavil	Swapna Lokathe Balabhaskaran	S. P. Venkatesh	Malayalam	-	
1996	Title Song	Swapna Lokathe Balabhaskaran	S. P. Venkatesh	Malayalam	-	
1996	Jeevithaminiyoru	Mimics Super 1000	S. P. Venkatesh	Malayalam	-	
1996	Kulirolamaay	Padanayakan	Rajamani	Malayalam	-	
1996	Ayyanar Kovil	Aramana Veedum Anjoorekkarum	Rajamani	Malayalam	-	
1996	Akale Nizhalaay	Dilliwala Rajakumaran	Ouseppachan	Malayalam	Biju Narayanan	
1996	Pranavathin Swaroopamam	Dilliwala Rajakumaran	Ouseppachan	Malayalam	-	
1996	Nagabhooshanam	Aayiram Naavulla Ananthan	Thulaseevanam comp, Johnson	Malayalam	-	
1997	Oh Priye	Aniyathipraavu	Ouseppachan	Malayalam	-	
1997	Theyyare	Anubhoothi	Shyam	Malayalam	Krishnachandran	
1998	Swarna Maane	Kottaram Veettile Apputtan	Berny–Ignatius	Malayalam	-	
1998	Velicham Vilakkine	Amma Ammaayiyamma	M. S. Viswanathan	Malayalam	-	Dubbed from the Telugu film Priyuralu
1998	Padumanabha	Manjeeradhwani (D)	Ilaiyaraaja	Malayalam	-	
1999	Eechi Elumichi	Taj Mahal	A. R. Rahman	Tamil	-	
1999	Azhaga Kallazhaga	Kallazhagar	Deva	Tamil	-	
1999	Vinave Cheli	Swayamvaram (1999 film)	Vandemataram Srinivas	Telugu	Sonu Nigam	
2000	Geyam Hari Namadheyam	Mazha	Raveendran	Malayalam	K. J. Yesudas	
2000	Hima Shaila	Mazha	Raveendran	Malayalam	K. J. YesudasK. S. Chithra	
2000	Pinakkamo	Aanamuttathe Aangalamar	Raveendran	Malayalam	-	
2002	Saandramam	Aalolam Kili	Adyaman	Malayalam	-	
2002	Swarnamaane	Anuraagam	Rajamani	Malayalam	-	
2003	Paalkkadalil (Pulluvan Paattu)	Gourisankaram	M. Jayachandran	Malayalam	M. Jayachandran	
2007	Manase Paadu Nee	Paranju Theeratha Visheshangal	M. Jayachandran	Malayalam	-	
2014	Maraa Sannibhakara	Swapaanam	Cherthala Gopalan Nair, Sreevalsan J. Menon	Malayalam	-	
2014	Iniyum Ethra Dooram	Iniyum Ethra Dooram	Shaji Kumar	Malayalam	-	
