= Filmfare Award for Best Art Director – South =

Indian annual film award

- Awarded for: Best work by an art director/production designer
- Country: India
- Presented by: Filmfare
- First award: 1998
- Currently held by: Nitin Zihani Choudhary for Kalki 2898 AD; Ramakrishna and Monica for Pushpa 2: The Rule; (2024)

Highlights
- Most wins: Sabu Cyril (4)

The Filmfare Best Award for Art Director / Production Designer is given by the Filmfare magazine as part of its annual Filmfare Awards for South Indian films.

The award was first given in 1998. Here is a list of the award winners and the films for which they won.

== Winners ==
Year	Art Director	Film	Language	Ref
1998	Thota Tharani	Choodalani Vundi	Telugu	
2005	Sabu Cyril	Anniyan	Tamil	
2007	Thota Tharani	Sivaji	Tamil	
2010	Sabu Cyril	Enthiran	Tamil	
2017	Sabu Cyril	Baahubali 2: The Conclusion	Telugu	
2022	Sabu Cyril	RRR	Telugu	
2023	Kolla Avinash	Dasara	Telugu	
2023	Thota Tharani	Ponniyin Selvan: II	Tamil	
2024	Nitin Zihani Choudhary	Kalki 2898 AD	Telugu	
2024	Ramakrishna	Pushpa 2: The Rule	Telugu	
2024	Monica	Pushpa 2: The Rule	Telugu	
