= Imsai Arasan 23rd Pulikecei =

2006 film by Chimbu Deven

- Theatrical release poster
- Directed by: Chimbu Deven
- Written by: Chimbu Deven
- Produced by: S. Shankar
- Starring: Vadivelu; Monica; Tejashree
- Cinematography: Arthur A. Wilson
- Edited by: G. Sasikumar
- Music by: Sabesh–Murali
- Distributed by: S Pictures
- Release date: 8 July 2006
- Running time: 142 minutes
- Country: India
- Language: Tamil
- Budget: 3.5 crores (Note: Film historian S. Theodore Baskaran and the entertainment news website Sify estimate the budget to be ₹ 30 million, and ₹ 40 million respectively.)
- Box office: 15 crores

Imsai Arasan 23rd Pulikecei (Note: Although the title card spells Imsai Arasan 23rd Pulikecei, the spellings Imsai Arasan 23aam Pulikesi, Imsai Arasan 23am Pulikesi, and Imsai Arasan 23m Pulikesi, have become more common.) (transl. Pulikesi XXIII, the king of nuisance) is a 2006 Indian Tamil-language historical-comedy film written and directed by Chimbu Deven in his directoral debut. The film stars Vadivelu in his debut as a solo lead actor. Monica and Tejashree play the female leads, while Manorama, Nassar, Ilavarasu, Sreeman and Nagesh play supporting roles. Sabesh–Murali composed the soundtrack album and background score. S. Shankar produced and distributed the film under his production banner S Pictures.

Set in the late 18th century during the early stages of the British Raj, the film tells the story of twin brothers separated at birth. Pulikesi XXIII, the foolish elder brother, becomes a puppet of his uncle, the Chief Minister, while Ukraputhan, the wise younger brother, becomes a patriot intent on saving his land and his brother.

Principal photography began in November 2005 at Prasad Studios. Imsai Arasan 23rd Pulikesi was released on 8 July 2006, and was the first historical Tamil film released since Madhuraiyai Meetta Sundharapandiyan (1978). The film received positive reviews, with critics praising the screenplay, the performances, and the dialogues. A box office success, the film won two Tamil Nadu State Film Awards and one Filmfare Award.

== Plot ==
In the South Indian kingdom of Cholapuram Paalayam in the year 1771, Raja Mokkaiyappar and his queen, Rani Bhavani Ammaiyar, are desperate for a child, as all 22 of their children have died at birth. Unknown to them, Bhavani's brother, Sangilimayan, who is also the Rajaguru (high priest), is responsible for the deaths of their children. Sangilimayan is shocked to see that his sister has given birth to twins. Before informing the king about the birth, he calls the palace astrologer, Chinnavadayaan, who predicts that the elder twin will be incapable of making decisions on his own, while the younger twin will be smarter. Sangilimayan orders the palace doctor, Kailasakaruppan, to kill the younger one, but Chinnavadayaan tells Sangilimayan that his actions would not be good for the kingdom. Instead, Sangilimayan orders Kailasakaruppan to abandon the child in a nearby river. The elder child is named Pulikesi XXIII. Maragathavalli, Kailasakaruppan's childless wife, rescues the abandoned child from the river, and the couple decides to raise him as their own, naming him Ukraputhan.

25 years pass, and Pulikesi is now the king of Cholapuram Paalayam. As foretold, he is foolish and lecherous. He is a puppet in the hands of Sangilimayan, who collaborates with the British for personal gain and does not attend to the needs of his kingdom's people. Pulikesi also tortures his subjects. He creates an outdoor stadium for different castes to fight each other. He punishes his palace guards for making even the slightest mistake; he also uses them as targets for shooting practice. Ukraputhan, now an educated revolutionary, collaborates with his friends to overthrow the British. Ukraputhan falls in love with Vasantha Sundari, who reciprocates his feelings. When Ukraputhan plots to overthrow Pulikesi for serving the British, he is shocked to see that they look alike.

Ukraputhan then learns about his birth from his foster parents and realizes that Pulikesi is his identical twin brother. To save the land from Sangilimayan and the British, Ukraputhan switches places with an unconscious Pulikesi as king while sending Pulikesi to prison. As king, Ukraputhan reveals his true identity to Agandamuthu, the commander-in-chief, and joins forces with him to help bring about new reforms. He turns the palace harem into a playground and helps fund and provide for children's education. To grow crops, he creates fertile land by tilling the soil. Breaking the past kingdom's policies, Ukraputhan refuses to pay tributes and taxes demanded by the British. Bhavani Ammaiyar praises Ukraputhan's reforms, unaware that Ukraputhan is disguised as Pulikesi. In jail, Soolayini tends to Pulikesi and provides refreshments to the soldiers. Eventually, the two fall in love.

All of this happens while Sangilimayan is away on a business trip visiting British officers in Chennai, Pattinam. When he learns of the new reforms, he confronts Ukraputhan, who defies him. Later, Pulikesi escapes from prison and overhears a conversation between Ukraputhan, Agandamuthu, and Chinnavadayaan. Pulikesi learns the truth about his birth and realizes his mistake. He reunites with Ukraputhan to reform the kingdom, but is beaten by one of Sangilimayan's men and is locked up in the palace. However, he escapes with the help of Kollan, the palace blacksmith. Believing Agandamuthu was responsible for Pulikesi's change of mind, Sangilimayan arrests him and Ukraputhan. After escaping, Pulikesi appears before Sangilimayan as Ukraputhan but is recognized by his minister, Mangunipandiyan, when he inadvertently uses his catchphrase. A fight between the twins and Sangilimayan follows; Sangilimayan is overpowered by Ukraputhan and is about to be killed when Bhavani Ammaiyar intervenes. Feeling guilty for betraying his kingdom, Sangilimayan, at the behest of his sister, has a change of heart and apologizes to her; she forgives him. The kingdom attains independence from British rule, and Pulikesi and Ukraputhan marry their respective lovers, Soolayini and Vasantha Sundari. Pulikesi then introduces 10 ordinances for the welfare of the people of Cholapuram Paalayam.

== Cast ==
- Vadivelu as King Pulikesi XXIII and Ukkirabudhhan
- Monica as Vasantha Sundari
- Tejashree as Soolayini
- Nassar as Sangilimaayan/Rajguru/Mama
- Ilavarasu as Minister Mangunipandiyan
- Sriman as Commander Agandamuthu
- Nagesh as Raja Mokkaiyappar
- Vennira Aadai Moorthy as Kailasakaruppan
- V. S. Raghavan as Chinnavadayaan
- Manorama as Rajamatha Bhavani Ammaiyar
- M. N. Rajam as Maragathavalli
- Manobala as Kollan (Blacksmith)
- Thyagu as King Vallavaraayan
- Muthukaalai as Spy Vadakodari
- Singamuthu as Poet Balabhadhra Onandi
- Thambi Ramaiah as Priest
- Paul Vincent as Nixon Durai
- Scissor Manohar as Sarangapani, palace guard
- Halwa Vasu as Prisoner
- Nellai Siva as Poet
- Bonda Mani as Prison guard
- Siva Narayana Murthy as Thief head Aruvamanai Sundaresan
- Pondy Ravi as Agandamuthu's henchmen who tries to kill Rajaguru in palace
- Nanditha Jennifer as dancer in "Aah Aadivaa" song

== Production ==
=== Development ===
Chimbu Deven worked as a cartoonist in the Tamil magazine Ananda Vikatan before venturing into mainstream cinema as an associate to director Cheran in three of his films, Vetri Kodi Kattu (2000), Pandavar Bhoomi (2001) and Autograph (2004). Imsai Arasan 23rd Pulikecei draws inspiration from a cartoon created by Deven, which originally appeared in Ananda Vikatan. Deven, who wrote the script, showed it to director S. Shankar. Shankar was impressed with the script as soon as he read it, and offered to produce and distribute the film under his production company S Pictures, making the film his third as producer after Mudhalvan (1999) and Kaadhal (2004).

As a former comic strip illustrator, Deven used the storyboard technique to develop the film. Cinematography was handled by Arthur A. Wilson and editing by G. Sasikumar. P. Krishnamoorthy was signed up as the film's art director. S. Naveen, who later directed Moodar Koodam (2013), worked as an assistant director in the film. The dialogues for the film were written in chaste Tamil. Research was conducted at the Roja Muthiah Research Library. (Note: In the film credits, the library is misspelt as Raja Muthiah Research Library.)

=== Casting ===
"The audience expect films like 'Imsai...’ once in a while and the success of the movie is a clear indication. Acting with Vadivelu is an enjoyable experience. He has a great sense of humour and times it to perfection."

— Nassar, in an interview with The Hindu in July 2007.

Deven approached Vadivelu in October 2005 and offered him the lead roles. Vadivelu was initially hesitant to accept the offer as he felt that the audience would not want to see him as the central character, but after Vadivelu read the script, he decided to take up the role. Regarding the selection of Vadivelu for the roles, Deven noted that one of the royal characters from his comic book strip in Ananda Vikatan closely resembled Vadivelu, including his complexion and nativity.

Swarnamalya and actress Nagma were considered for the female leads, but Monica and Tejashree eventually got the parts. Director-actor Ilavarasu played the role of Pulikecei's minister, Mangunipandiyan. Actress M. N. Rajam played Ukraputhan's mother. Nagesh played Raja Mokkayappar.

=== Filming ===
Principal photography began at Prasad Studios on 16 November 2005, under the working title of Imsai Mannan 23am Pulikesi. It was the first historical film made in Tamil cinema since Madhuraiyai Meetta Sundharapandiyan (1978) almost three decades previously. Shooting also took place at AVM Studios. The second schedule of the film was held in Prasad Studios. The song "Aah Adivaa" was shot at Prasad Studios and choreographed by Sivasankar. Due to poor weather, the outdoor portions of the song were shot indoors.

A total of eleven sets were created for all of the filming schedules. Filming also took place in Chengalpattu, Tiruvannamalai and Pondicherry. Spoofs on Sivaji Ganesan, M. G. Ramachandran and Avvaiyar are seen in the film. Wipes and split screen transitions are commonly used. Principal photography was completed in 55—61 days. (Note: Malathi Rangarajan of The Hindu gives the completion time as 55 days, whereas Sundararaj Theodore Baskaran gives the completion time as 61 days.)

== Themes and influences ==
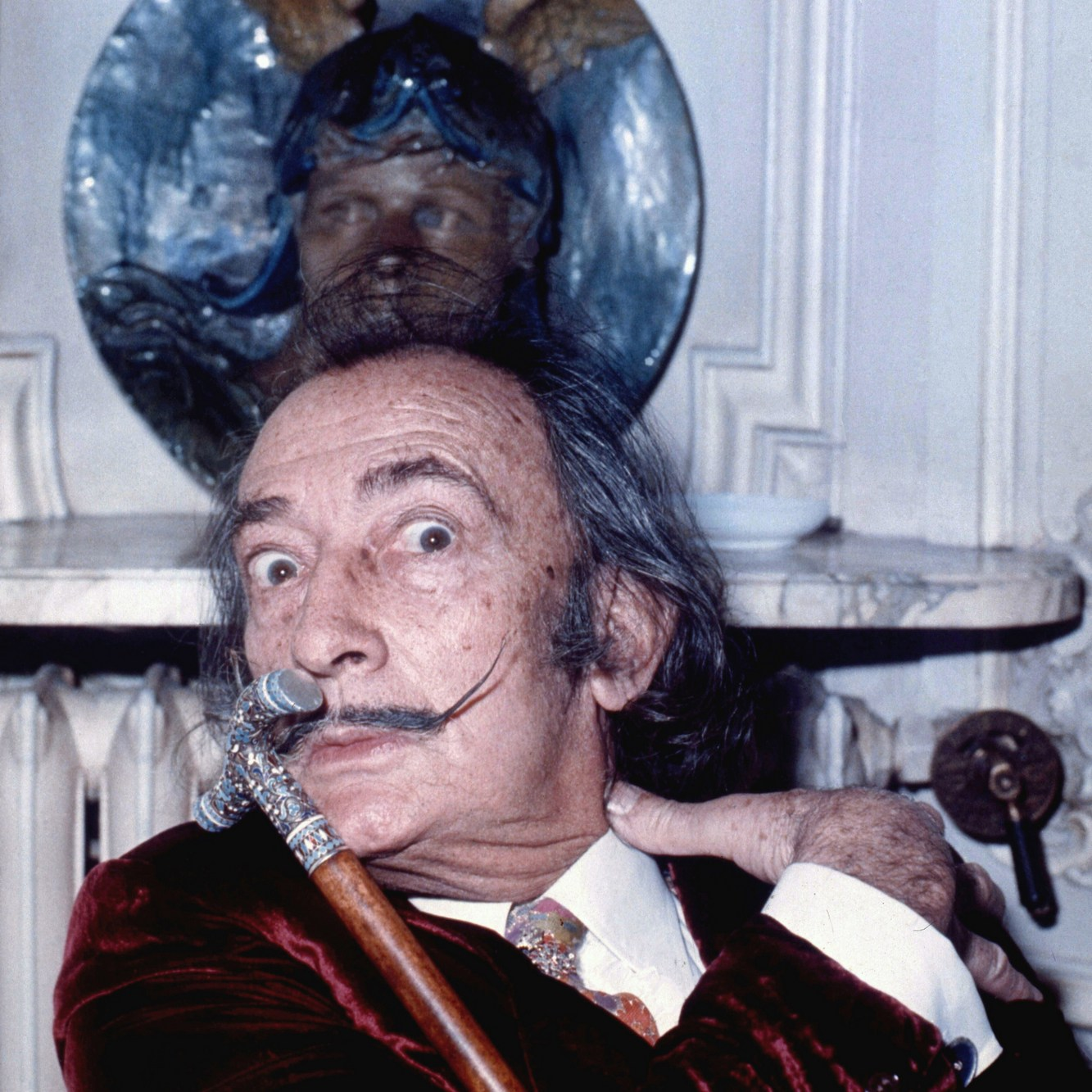
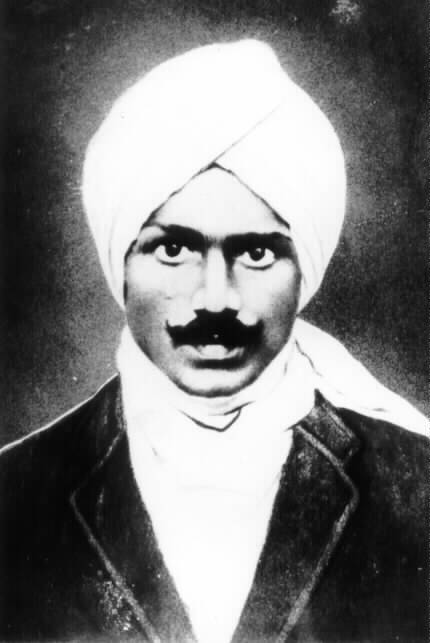
Vadivelu's moustache in the film is based on those sported by Salvador Dalí (left) and Subramania Bharati (right)

Although Imsai Arasan 23rd Pulikecei is a historical film set in the late 18th century AD, most of the issues it raises are contemporary. Topics discussed include child labour, globalisation, the bureaucratic inefficiency of government, pesticide usage in soft drinks, and divisions in the caste system.

In their 2010 book, Cinemas of South India: Culture, Resistance, Ideology under the section Dualities and Negotiation 23rd Imsai Arasan Pulikesi, Sowmya Dechamma C. C., Elavarthi Sathya Prakash and Jananie Kalyanaraman mention the soft drinks that are satirized include Coca-Cola and Pepsi. The two are called Akka Mala and Gup-C respectively. They also note that Pulikesi and Ukraputhan have contrasting differences with respect to attitude towards women, education, governance, and demonstration of both skill in weaponry and physical prowess. Kalyanaraman compares Vadivelu's balancing of both his comic and heroic abilities through the roles of Pulikesi and Ukraputhan to Nagesh's roles in Server Sundaram (1964) and Ethir Neechal (1968), where Nagesh plays more serious roles.

The mustache sported by Vadivelu is inspired and modeled after mustaches worn by the Spanish Catalan surrealist painter, Salvador Dalí and Tamil poet, Subramania Bharati. Historical references in the film include places like Nalanda University, which was active around the 2nd century AD, and people like Veerapandiya Kattabomman, Robert Clive, and Ettappan.

S. Theodore Baskaran and Malathi Rangarajan called the film a parody of Uthama Puthiran (1958). Malathi Rangarajan said that the sequences in the song "Aah Aadivaa" are reminiscent of scenes from the song "Yaaradi Nee Mohini" from Uthama Puthiran. Theodore Baskaran also compared the film to M. G. Ramachandran films like Malaikkallan (1954) and Nadodi Mannan (1958). (Note: Dechamma C. C., Prakash and Kalyanaraman also compare the film to Nadodi Mannan in terms of Vadivelu playing dual roles.) Saraswathy Srinivas of Rediff compared the film to Alexandre Dumas's novel, The Man in the Iron Mask.

== Music ==
Sabesh–Murali composed both the film's soundtrack album and background score. The soundtrack album features five songs with lyrics written by Pulamaipithan. The songs were rendered in a style authentic to the film's period setting. The soundtrack album was released on 9 June 2006.

The album was received positively by critics. G. Dhananjayan, in his book Best of Tamil Cinema, said the songs contributed to the film's success and were popular during its theatrical run. Praises were directed mainly towards the musicians, the melodious interludes of "Aah Aadivaa" and the fusion of modern western and traditional Indian music in "Vaanam Namakul".

Tracklist
No.	Title	Singer(s)	Length
1.	"Aah Aadivaa"	Manikka Vinayagam, Binny Krishnakumar, Saindhavi, Kovai Kamala, Vadivelu	5:49
2.	"Pootiya Sirayinai"	Tippu	5:08
3.	"Panju Methai Kaniyae"	Krishnaraj, Swarnalatha	4:32
4.	"Aasai Kanave"	Naresh Iyer, Kalyani Nair	5:11
5.	"Vaanam Namakul"	T. L. Maharajan	5:01
Total length:			25:41

== Marketing and release ==
The film was originally scheduled for release on 19 May 2006. However, the film's release was delayed due to its use of animals without prior approval from the Animal Welfare Board of India (AWBI). According to a rule issued in 2001, film producers must obtain prior approval from the AWBI to use animals in a film. Further, scenes with animals must be filmed with a veterinary physician on the set. Crucial to the film's story, the scenes were not re-edited. In an interview, Deven stated that the elephants and horses in the film were not subjected to any cruelty.

When Shankar approached the AWBI for a No Objection Certificate (NOC), he was denied. On 18 May, the Madras High Court requested that the AWBI issue the necessary certificate, but the organisation refused and said that it was the responsibility of the Central Board of Film Certification (CBFC). In response, the CBFC cited a rule issued by the Bombay High Court, which noted that it was mandatory for the AWBI to provide an NOC to films which used animals. This led to the initial postponement of the film's release until 9 June. On 13 June, the Madras High Court ordered that the film be given a censorship certificate by 19 June, along with the NOC from the AWBI. Because of this sequence of events, the film's release date was further postponed.

Shankar and Vadivelu requested the then Chief Minister of Tamil Nadu, M. Karunanidhi, to intervene. A week before the release date, and with the help of Karunanidhi, Imsai Arasan 23rd Pulikecei was cleared by the Central Government. The film received an NOC, and was subsequently given a 'U' (Universal) certificate without any cuts by the CBFC. After months of delay, the film's release finally occurred on 8 July in 135 screens across Tamil Nadu. R. B. Choudary's Super Good Films purchased the theatrical rights of the Telugu dubbed version, which was released with the title, Himsinche 23 Va Raju Pulikesi. Brahmanandam and Tanikella Bharani dubbed for Vadivelu and Ilavarasu in the Telugu version, respectively.

The film was banned in Karnataka as the Karnataka Film Chamber of Commerce objected to a spoof film with Pulikecei's name in the title being released in their state. Pulakesi II was a famous king who belonged to the Western Chalukya Empire and ruled the Karnataka region in the seventh century.

Post-release, vendors sold unauthorised copies of the film on VCD in many areas of Tamil Nadu, especially in Chennai, where CDs were sold for ₹ 35 to 40, and Madurai and Dindigul, where CDs were sold at ₹ 45 to 50. Police conducted raids in the Avadi and Ambattur areas of Chennai where they seized 6636 VCDs. Although infringement helped increase the film's popularity, its theatrical run at the box office was still a financial success.

Sri Lankan Cricketer Muttiah Muralitharan watched the film in Kamala Theatres in Chennai with his family on 11 July 2006. He praised the film's innovative story, further saying that Vadivelu had developed a huge fan following in Sri Lanka through this film. To further promote the film, 50 children who watched it were given "Pulikesi moustaches". The moustache became quite popular with children and further boosted the film's popularity. Deven said that the moustache would become as popular as Superman's outfit and Spider-Man's mask.

Distributed by AP International, it was released on DVD in single disc format. The satellite rights of the film were sold to Kalaignar TV, and the worldwide premiere occurred on channel's launch date 15 September 2007.

== Reception ==
=== Critical response ===
Critics responded positively to Imsai Arasan 23rd Pulikesi, noting the quality of its story, Vadivelu's performance, its highlighting of contemporary political and social concerns, and the film's art direction, cinematography, and music. Malathi Rangarajan of The Hindu approved of the way Deven presented comedy, saying that it came in "the most unexpected situations." Film historian Sundararaj Theodore Baskaran described Imsai Arasan 23rd Pulikecei as "a parody with healthy concerns".

Both Bijoy Bharathan of The Times of India and Sudhish Kamath of The Hindu applauded Vadivelu's comic timing. Ananda Vikatan, in its original review of the film dated 23 July 2006, lauded Vadivelu's performance. S. Sudha of Rediff.com said that Vadivelu was the strength of the film. She credited the film's art direction and cinematography as one of its major highlights. Art director Krishnamoorthy performed intense research to create the costumes for the characters and to design the palace sets. According to Theodore Baskaran, Arthur A. Wilson's cinematography "creates a series of arresting images" which helps facilitate the directorial narrative. However, Sify criticised the inclusion of songs in the film post-interval, stating that they "mar the film's tempo". Lajjavathi of Kalki praised the acting of Vadivelu, the film's humour, Sabesh-Murali's background score and Krishnamoorthy's art direction and concluded saying amidst gangster and affair based films, a Tamil film to be watched with family and children itself is a historical achievement. Cinesouth wrote "At a time when film subjects centre on lust and gangsterism, director Shankar deserves credit for having the guts to produce a historical film that one can watch with the family". Malini Mannath of Chennai Online wrote "'Imsai Arasan..' is no doubt a fairly neatly packaged wholesome family entertainer, a laudable experiment. But those who go with the expectation of watching a hilarious comic caper, a joke-a-minute laugh riot, what with Vadivelu donning two roles, would find it a bit of a lag and a bit of a disappointment... For there's not much of laughs here".

=== Box office ===
Imsai Arasan 23rd Pulikecei was a box office success. The film opened to full houses in theatres across Chennai, Coimbatore and Madurai. At the Mayajaal Multiplex centre in Chennai, the film grossed ₹ 301,000 in its first week and a total of ₹ 427,000 by the end of the second week of its theatrical run. Tickets were sold in black at the Devi Cineplex in Chennai for ₹ 150 against the original theatre price of ₹ 50.

The film completed a theatrical run of 100 days at the box office. The film's 100th day celebration function was held on 14 October 2006 at the Kalaivanar Arangam located in the Chepauk district of Chennai. Rajinikanth, Vijay, Vivek, Sathyaraj, Prabhu Ganesan, Abirami Ramanathan and directors Lingusamy and Balaji Sakthivel attended the function. Rajinikanth presented Vadivelu with a trophy for his performance in the film. Technicians who were involved with the film were also honoured. According to an analysis in 2007 by T. V. Mahalingam of Business Today, the film earned a worldwide box office collection of ₹ 150 million.

=== Accolades ===
The film won two Tamil Nadu State Film Awards. Vadivelu won the Best Comedian award while P. Krishnamoorthy won the Best Art Director award. Vadivelu also won the Filmfare Award for Best Comedian for his performance in the film.

== Legacy ==
Imsai Arasan 23rd Pulikecei became an important film in Vadivelu's career. It continued a trend of films with different themes that focused on social issues. K. Jeshi of The Hindu placed it in a category of films that discuss social issues like Sethu (1999), Kaadhal (2004), Veyil (2006), Mozhi (2007) and Paruthiveeran (2007). Another critic from The Hindu, Sumit Bhattacharjee, compared it with other period films like The Ten Commandements (1956) Ben-Hur (1959) Titanic (1997), Gladiator (2000), 300 (2007) and Jodhaa Akbar (2008).

Mahendran included Imsai Arasan 23rd Pulikecei in his list of all-time favourite films. H. Murali, who produced the film Jaganmohini (2009), in an interview with Malathi Rangarajan of The Hindu, says the success of Imsai Arasan 23rd Pulikecei inspired him to make Jaganmohini. Subha J. Rao and K. Jeshi of The Hindu placed the film in league with other successful comedy films like Kadhalikka Neramillai (1964), Thillu Mullu (1981) and Michael Madana Kama Rajan (1990).

Behindwoods included the "Pulikesi moustache" in its list of "Best accessories used in Tamil Cinema". A dialogue spoken by Vadivelu in the film, "Ka Ka Ka Po", which expands into Karuththukkalai Katchithamaaga Kavvikkondir Pongal (You have understood what I am saying), became a very popular meme used on social networking sites. Behindwoods included this dialogue in its list of Vadivelu memes. "Ka Ka Ka Po" also served as the title for a 2016 Tamil film by P. S. Vijay and as an acronym for director Nalan Kumarasamy's romantic comedy Kadhalum Kadandhu Pogum (2016). The dialogue "Pandrikku Nandri Solli" (Saying thank you to the Pig) inspired the title of a 2022 film.

== Cancelled sequel ==
In August 2017, Shankar announced that a sequel, titled Imsai Arasan 24th Pulikecei, was scheduled for release in 2018. Vadivelu signed on to reprise his role as Pulikesi while Chimbu Deven and Shankar were to return as director and producer respectively. Shankar would have co-produced the film with Allirajah Subaskaran of Lyca Productions. Parvathy Omanakuttan was cast as the film's heroine. Ghibran joined as the music composer while R. Saravanan, a former assistant to Nirav Shah, was hired to be the cinematographer. Vivek Harshan and T. Muthuraj were chosen for handling the editing and art direction respectively. Vadivelu later opted out, citing creative differences, and the project was dropped mid-way through shoot.

== Sources ==
- Dechamma C. C., Sowmya; Prakash, Elavarthi Sathya; Kalyanaraman, Jananie (2010). "Dualities and Negotiation: 23rd Imsai Arasan Pulikesi". Cinemas of South India: Culture, Resistance, and Ideology. Oxford University Press. ISBN 978-0-1980-6795-5.
- Dhananjayan, G. (2011). The Best of Tamil Cinema, 1931 to 2010: 1977–2010. Galatta Media. ISBN 978-81-921043-0-0.
