= College of Fine Arts, Thrissur =

Art school in Thrissur, India

Government College of Fine Arts, Thrissur
- Type: Education
- Established: 1910; 116 years ago
- Principal: Prof. Manoj Kannan
- Location: Thrissur, Kerala, India
- Campus: Urban
- Website: http://gcfatcr.ac.in/

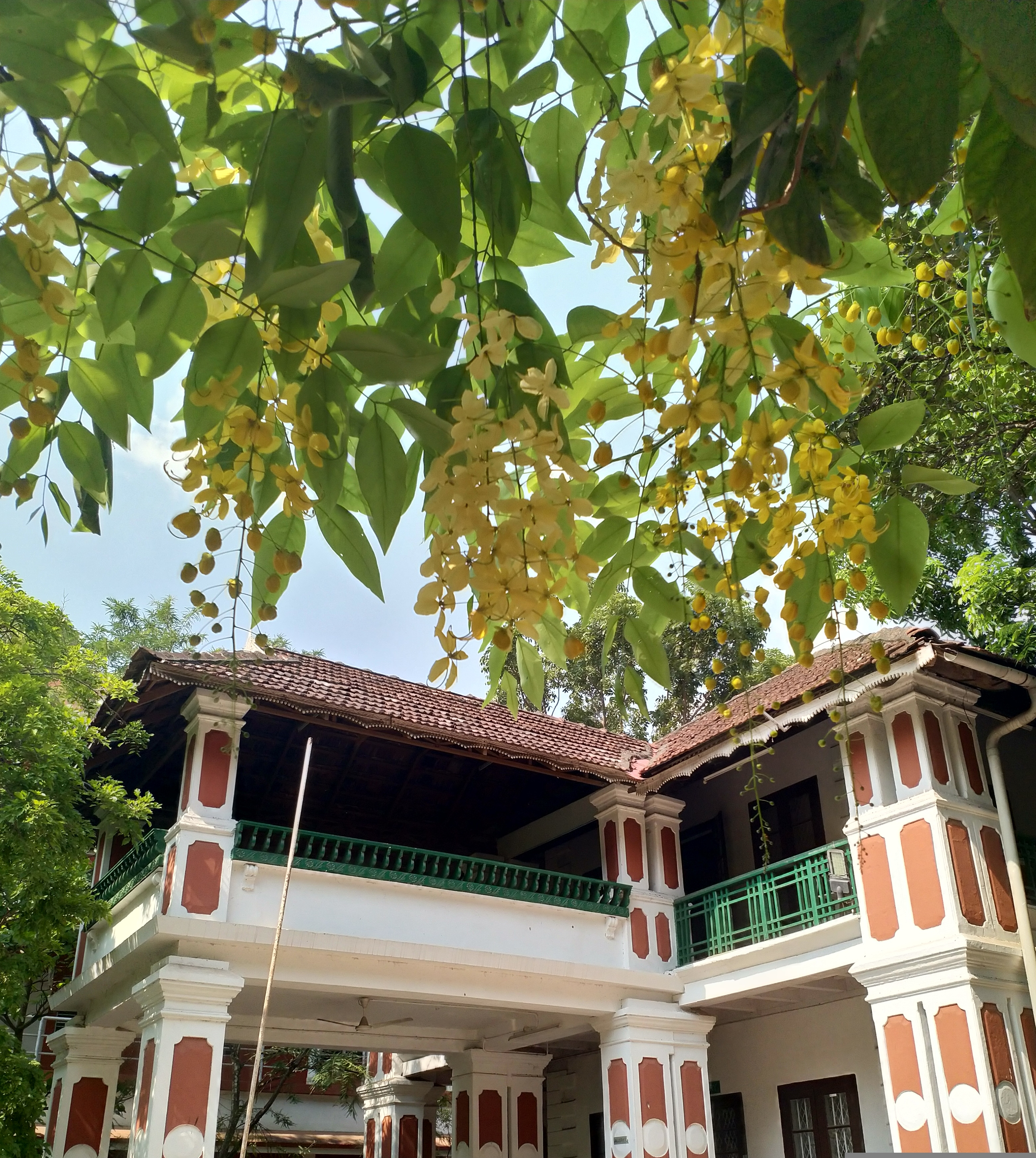
The Heritage Building

Government College of Fine Arts, Thrissur is located in the heart of the city of Thrissur in Kerala state of India. More than hundred years of existence has given a unique character to this institution in the history of art institutions in India. As a graduate level art college, this institution initiate young minds to work with the world of Art and Design and make a life in their own terms. As a Technical Commercial Industrial School, it was in 1910 that this institution started functioning. At that time, art education was basically an industrial training in order to produce skilled craftsmen and related vocational labors. During the second world war, the institution was renamed as ‘Government Trade School’. From 1943 to 1975, it was known as Government Occupational Institute. The fundamental shift from a vocational labor towards a more aesthetic ‘Fine Arts’ orientation occurred when it was upgraded as Govt.Institute of Fine Arts, in the year 1975. This was also about a raise and shift in the status of ‘artist’ in the modern sense of the term. In 1988 the title called National Diploma offered by this institute for its five year courses, gave training in Painting, Sculpture and Applied Art. In 2000, the status of this institute was raised as it got affiliated with the University of Calicut and started offering four year Bachelor of Fine Arts ( BFA ) degree in three specialisations: Painting, Sculpture and Applied Arts. In the year 2019, a new course in Art History and Visual Studies has also started.

== Faculty Members ==
- Prof. P. K. Manoj, Principal
- Prof. A. P. Sunilkumar, HOD in Sculpture
- Prof. Abhilash Das, HOD in Applied Arts
- Dr. Kavitha Balakrishnan, HOD in Art History and Visual Studies
- Sri. Anirudhan T., Lecturer in Applied Arts
- Sri. Raveendran K. P., Lecturer in Applied Arts
- Sri. Vinod K., Lecturer in Applied Arts
- Sri. Jinan K. V., Lecturer in Applied Arts
- Dr. Gipin Varghese, Lecturer & HOD in Painting
- Sri. Akhiljith V., Lecturer in Painting
- Sri. Hariharan K. N., Lecturer in Sculpture
- Sri. Bhagath Singh E. K., Lecturer in Sculpture

== Alumni ==
- P. N. Menon
- K. Karunakaran
- Artist Namboothiri
- Bharathan
- V. K. Sreeraman
- A. V. Gokuldas
- T. V. Santhosh
- Pooja Mohanraj
- Murali Cheeroth
- Shan K R
- Soya sathyan
- Sujith S. N.
- Abul Hisham
- PG Dinesh
- Ajayan chalissery
- Santhosh Raman
- Anto George
- Jayan Narayanan
- Jimmy Varghese
