= R. Verman =

Indian art director (1947–2019)

Ratna Verman Shetty
- Born: 1947; Mangalore, India
- Died: 30 July 2019
- Other name: R. Verman
- Education: J. J. School of Art, Mumbai
- Occupation: Art director
- Organization(s): Takshila (publicity designing and cine advertising business company)
- Notable work: Hum, Angaar
- Awards: Filmfare Award for Best Art Direction (twice)

Ratna Verman Shetty (1947 – 30 July 2019), usually credited as R. Verman, was an Indian art director.

== Early life ==
Born in Mangalore, Verman is an alumnus of J. J. School of Art, Mumbai. After completing his education he started his own publicity designing and cine advertising business company called ‘Takshila’. During this time his major clients were Navketan films and Verman worked on production houses of films like Jewel Thief and Guide.

== Career ==
While working as a publicity designer Verman became interested in art direction and worked as an assistant of noted art director Sudhendu Roy for few years before becoming a full-fledged art director. From then on Verman has worked on more than 350 films and has won the Filmfare award for best art direction twice for the films Hum and Angaar in the year 1992 and 1993.
