= Ek Nadir Galpo: Tale of a River =

- Theatrical release poster
- Directed by: Samir Chanda
- Screenplay by: Samir Chanda; Shyamali Dey
- Story by: Sunil Gangopadhyay adapted from his short story
- Produced by: Sangeeta Ajay Agarwal; Leela Chanda
- Starring: Mithun Chakraborty; Shweta Prasad; Nirmal Kumar; Anjan Srivastav; Jisshu Sengupta
- Cinematography: Rajan Kothari
- Edited by: Sanjib Datta
- Music by: Nachiketa
- Release dates: 24 October 2008 (IFFI); 14 August 2015 (Theatrical)
- Country: India
- Language: Bengali

Ek Nadir Galpo: Tale of a River is a 2008 Bengali-language Indian feature film directed by Samir Chanda and produced by Sangeeta Ajay Agarwal and Leela Chanda, starring Mithun Chakraborty, Shweta Prasad, Jisshu Sengupta, Anjan Srivastav and Nirmal Kumar.

The film was India's entry for the Asian, African and Latin American competition segment of the 38th International Film Festival of India (IFFI), held in Goa, 2007.

The film was officially released in theaters on 14 August 2015 even though it was made in 2007.

== Plot ==
Ekk Nadir Galpo is an adaptation of short stories of Sunil Gangopadhay. Although initially set to be released on the cinema, it went to film festivals worldwide.

It shows the special relationship a father and daughter share. Anu considers Darakeshwar her hero and Anu is his pride, joy and life. Tragedy strikes as Anu drowns in Keleghai river. The bond between Darakeshwar and Anu transcends time and even Anu's death. Now Darakeshwar's only goal is to rename the river Keleghai as Anjana in memory of his loving daughter.

It shows whether Darakeshwar is right in wanting to rename the river and if the names of rivers can be changed very easily. The film shows who helps Darakeshwar in his goal and if he manages to rename the river.

== Cast ==
- Mithun Chakraborty as Darakeshwar
- Shweta Prasad as Anu
- Jisshu Sengupta
- Anjan Srivastav
- Nirmal Kumar
- Montu Mohapatra
- Krishna Kishore Mukherjee

== Critical response ==
Times of India gave the film four out of five stars, lauding Ek Nadir Galpo as a visual masterpiece that holds you and glues not only to your seat, but also to the silver screen, wondering what could possibly happen after the intermission. They appreciated director Samir Chanda and lead actor Mithun Chakraborty, mentioning it as one of his career's best performances.
