= Sabu Cyril =

Indian film production designer

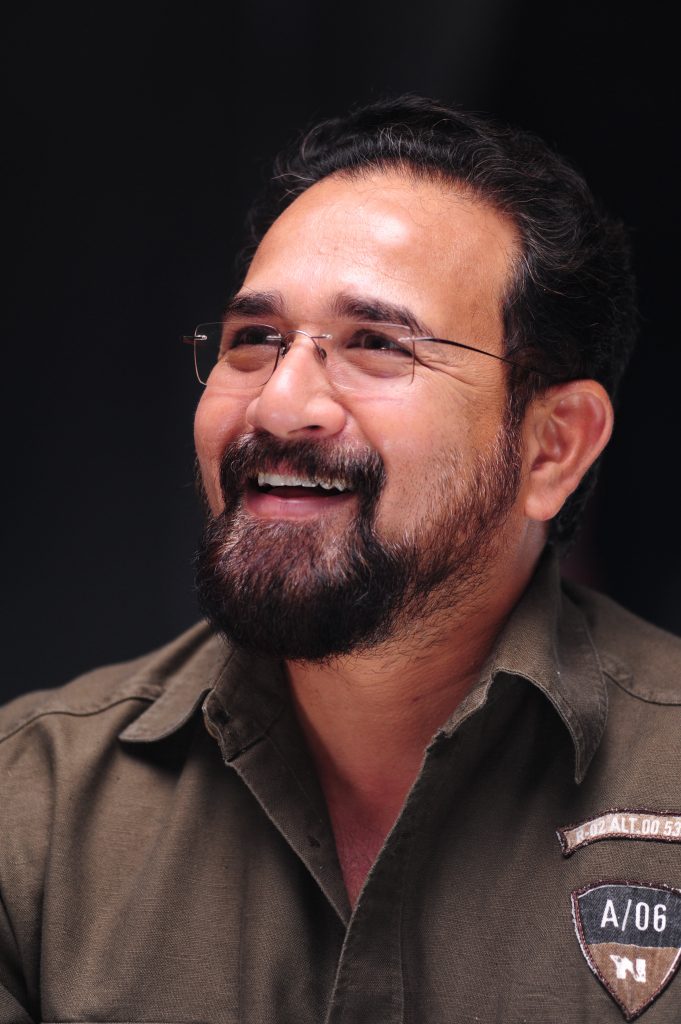
- Born: Sebastian Vincent Cyril; 27 January 1962 (age 64); Valparai, Coimbatore district, Madras State (now Tamil Nadu), India
- Education: Government College of Fine Arts, Chennai
- Occupation: Art director
- Years active: 1990–present
- Known for: Production design
- Notable work: Thenmavin Kombath, Kaalapani, Hey Ram, Aśoka, Yuva, Kannathil Muthamittal, Om Shanti Om, Enthiran, Baahubali, RRR
- Awards: National Film Awards (1994, 1995, 2007, 2010); Filmfare Awards (1994, 2000, 2005 (2), 2010,2017)
- Website: sabucyril.co

Sabu Cyril (born 27 January 1962) is an Indian film production designer and member of Academy of Motion Picture Arts and Sciences(Oscar), who is considered to be one of the most celebrated art directors in the country. Having worked in 115 feature films and 2000 ad films, he has won 4 National Film Award for Best Production Design, 4 State awards, 6 Filmfare Award for Best Art Direction (including south), 5 International Indian Film Academy Awards(IIFA), among many other awards. His works which won him international recognition are Enthiran (2010), Baahubali: The Beginning (2015), Baahubali 2: The Conclusion (2017) and RRR (2022).

== Early life and education ==
Cyril was born as Sebastian Vincent Cyril in the hill station of Valparai, Coimbatore District, Tamil Nadu. He completed his schooling in Asan Memorial in Chennai; he graduated from the Government College of Fine Arts, Chennai, formerly Government School of Arts and Crafts, Chennai). It was his grandfather, George Vincent, who first called him as 'Sabu'. George Vincent was known for opening the first photography studio in Malabar, Kozhikode, called Chitra Studio. His son, A. Vincent, Sabu's uncle, was a reputed cinematographer and director in South Indian cinema. Vincent's sons, Jayanan Vincent and Ajayan Vincent, who are both cinematographers, are Sabu's cousins.

It was probably his proximity to nature, wildlife, and cinema that subconsciously helped Sabu develop an affinity to the world of aesthetics and design. Ever since he was a child, Sabu was always interested in knowing how things work and how this can be applied in everyday life. This curiosity drew him to the world of physics and chemistry, which helped him develop a scientific and practical outlook to problem-solving. Sabu started his career as a graphic designer and illustrator. It was only as a favour to a friend that he entered a film set. Circumstance and chance made Sabu an art director on his first ever film. He believed that he could rise to the challenge because of his inclination towards science and art, it may seem as if he was destined to be a production designer all along.

== Career ==
From 1982 to 1988, he was a freelance graphics designer for companies such as Welcomgroup Hotels, the Taj Group of Hotels, and Madura Coats. In 1988, he began his art director career, and has directed more than 2,500 advertisements, 3 teleserials and 115 feature films in Malayalam, Hindi, Tamil, Telugu and Kannada and designed several stage shows. In 1996, he directed the stage design for the Miss World beauty pageant. He also worked as one of the 2nd unit Art Directors in the 1990 film Iyer the Great.

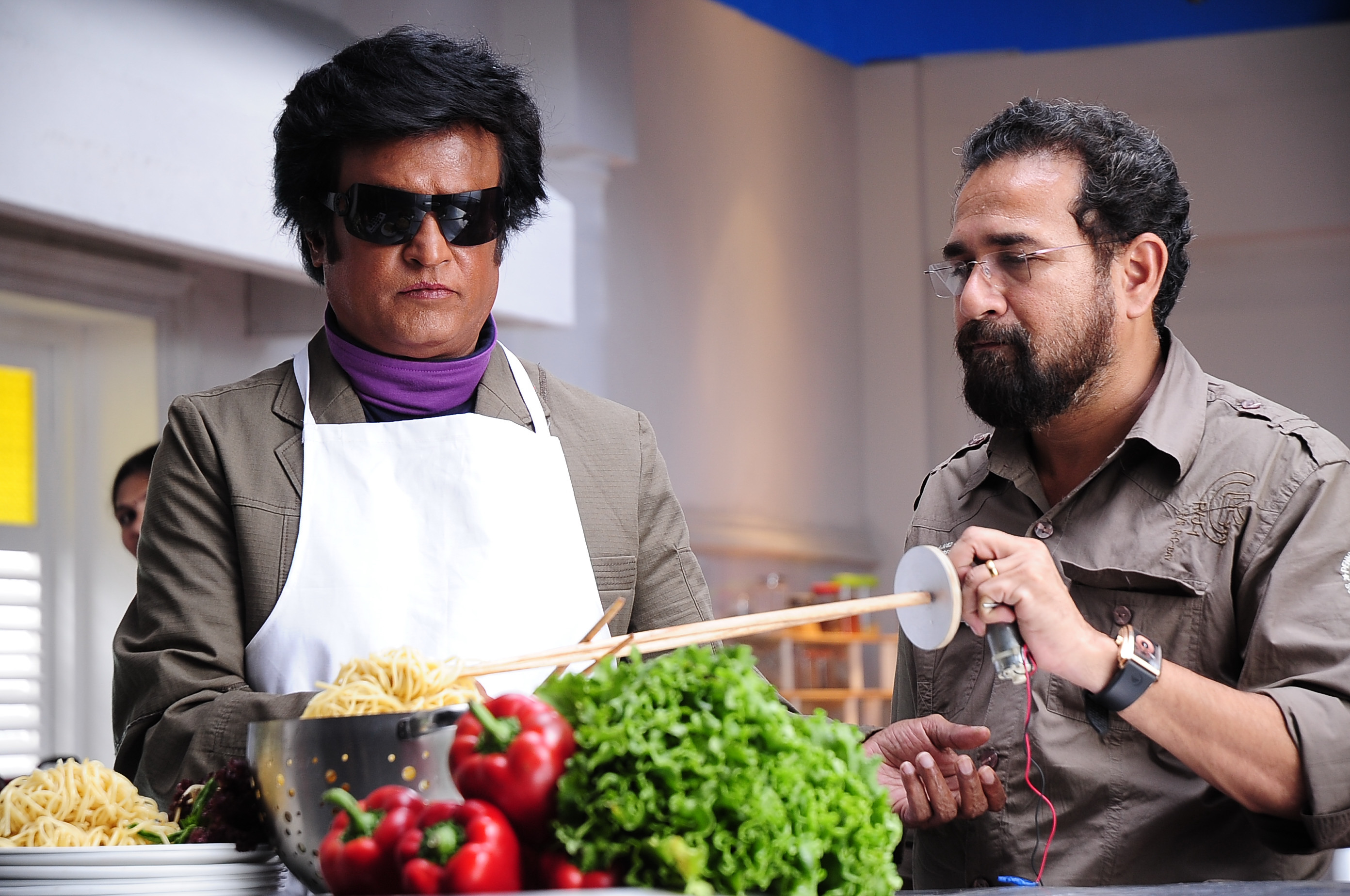

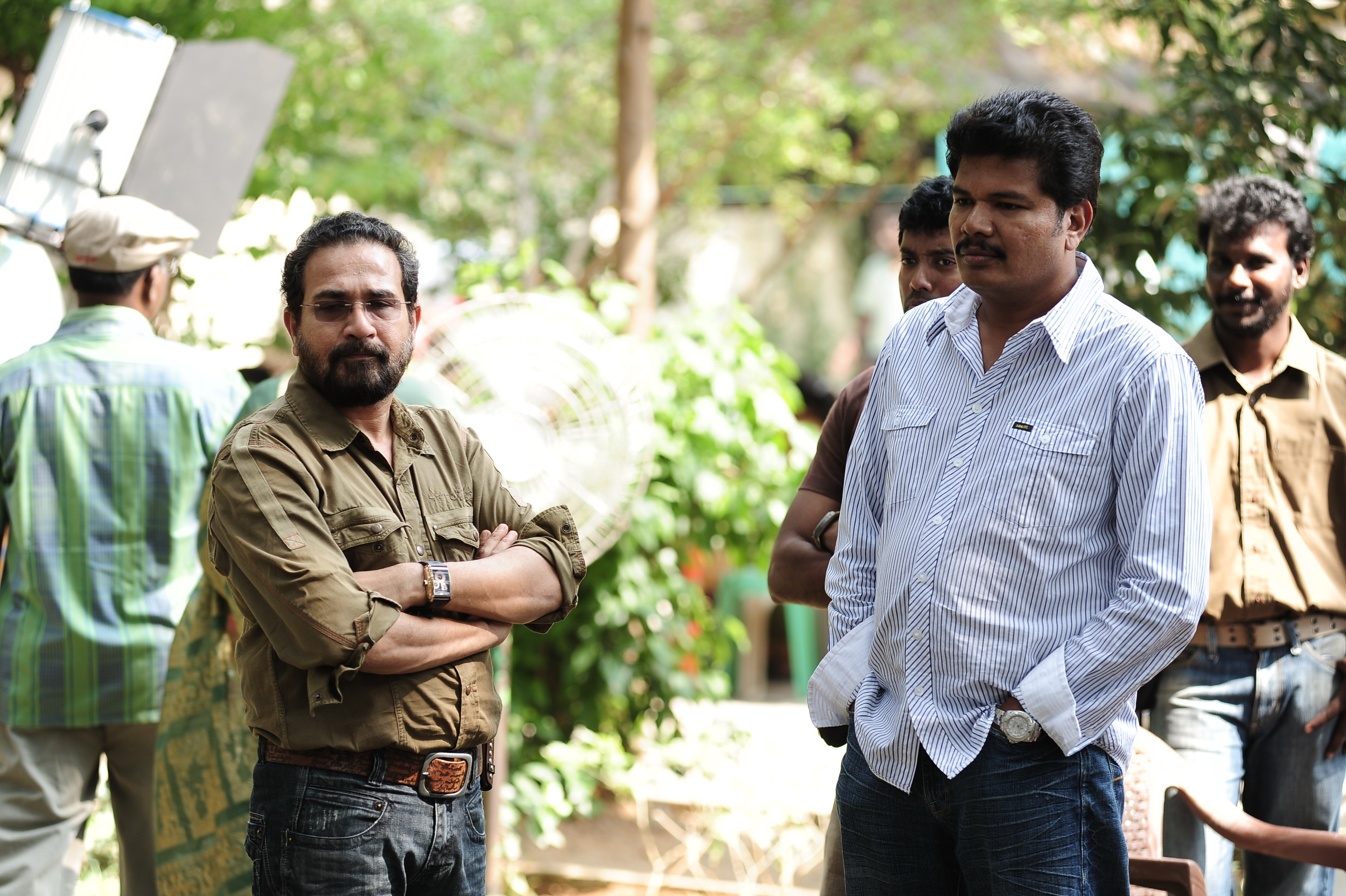

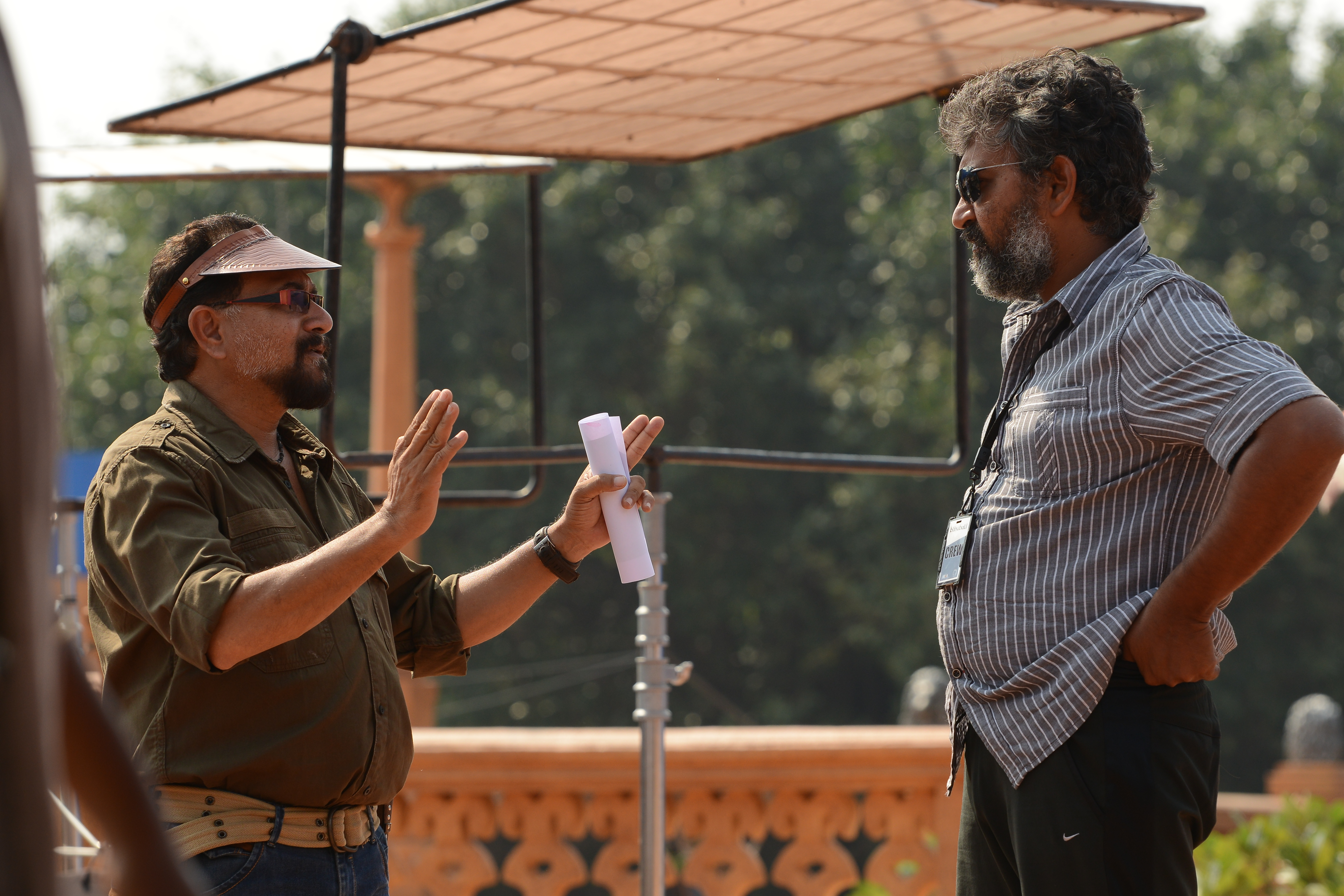

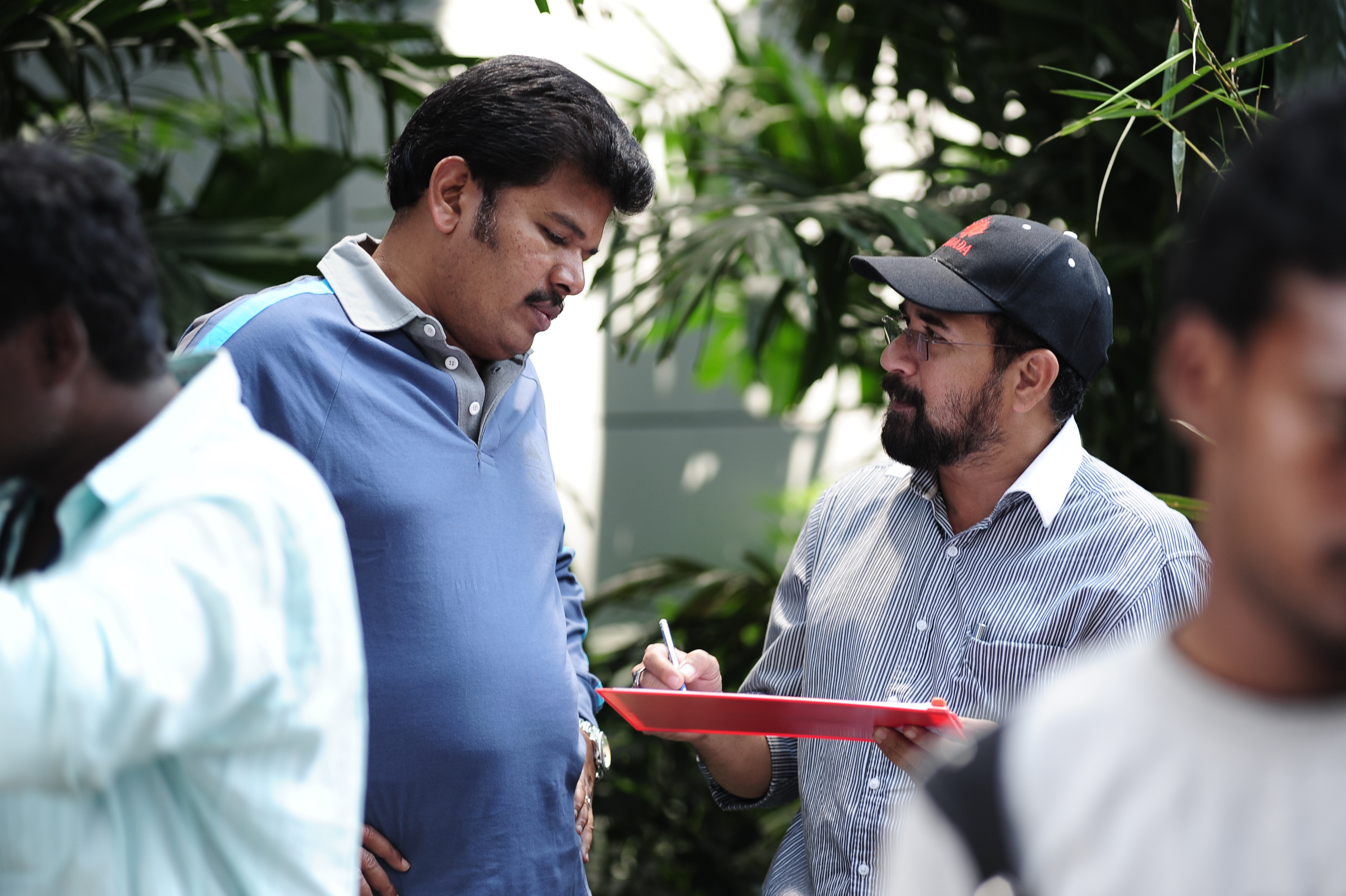

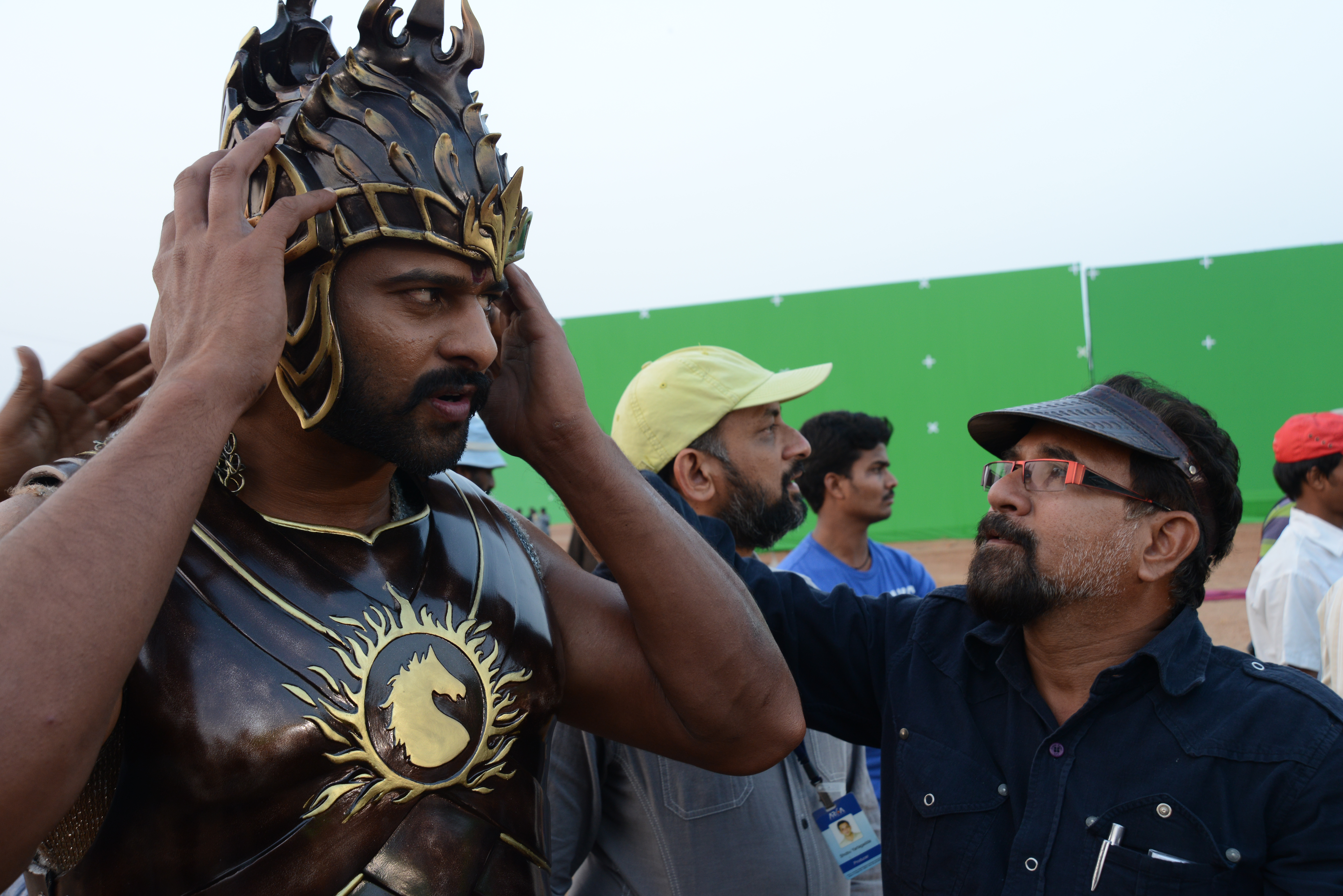

== Filmography ==
=== As art director ===
==== Malayalam ====
- Iyer the Great (1990)
- Amaram (1991)
- Uncle Bun (1991)
- Adwaytham (1991)
- Mahanagaram (1992)
- Dhruvam (1993)
- Minnaram (1994)
- Thenmavin Kombath (1994)
- Pavithram (1994)
- Sainyam (1994)
- Maanthrikam (1995)
- Kaalapani (1996)
- Chandralekha (1997)
- Kannezhuthi Pottum Thottu (1999)
- Megham (1999)
- Raakilipattu (2000)
- Kakkakuyil (2001)
- Kilichundan Mampazham (2003)
- Magic Magic 3D (2003)
- Aakasha Gopuram (2008)
- Oru Marubhoomikkadha (2011)
- Kolaambi (2019)
- Marakkar: Lion of the Arabian Sea (2021)

==== Hindi ====
- Muskurahat (1992)
- Gardish (1993)
- Virasat (1997)
- Saat Rang Ke Sapne (1998)
- Kabhi Na Kabhi (1998)
- Doli Saja Ke Rakhna (1998)
- Major Saab (1998)
- Pukar (2000)
- Hey Ram (2000)
- Hera Pheri (2000)
- Raja Ko Rani Se Pyar Ho Gaya (2000)
- Aśoka (2001)
- Bas Itna Sa Khwaab Hai (2001)
- Yeh Teraa Ghar Yeh Meraa Ghar (2001)
- Om Jai Jagadish (2002)
- Hungama (2003)
- Khushi (2003)
- Main Hoon Na (2003)
- Yuva (2004)
- Hulchul (2004)
- Phir Milenge
- Kuchh Meetha Ho Jaye (2005)
- Garam Masala (2005)
- Kyon Ki (2005)
- Chup Chup Ke (2006)
- Malamaal Weekly (2006)
- Jaan-E-Mann (2006)
- Bhagam Bhag (2006)
- Welcome (2007)
- Dhol (2007)
- Guru (2007)
- Bhool Bhulaiyaa (2007)
- Om Shanti Om (2007)
- Mere Baap Pehle Aap (2008)
- Aladin (2009)
- De Dana Dan (2009)
- Billu (2009)
- Khatta Meetha (2010)
- Bumm Bumm Bole (2010)
- Aakrosh (2010)
- Tees Maar Khan (2010)
- Ra.One (2011)
- Tezz (2012)
- Kamaal Dhamaal Malamaal (2012)
- Son of Sardaar (2012)
- Rangrezz (2013)
- Himmatwala (2013)
- Run Bhola Run (2013)
- Krrish 3 (2013)
- Final Cut of Director (2016)
- Shivaay (2016)
- Saaho (2019)
- Bhooth Bangla (2026)
- Haiwaan

==== Tamil ====
- Kalaignan (1993)
- Pudhiya Mugam (1993)
- Paasamalargal (1994)
- Kannathil Muthamittal (2001)
- Citizen (2001)
- Thamizhan (2002)
- Panchathantiram (2002)
- Iyarkai (2003)
- Boys (2003)
- Lesa Lesa (2003)
- Ayutha Ezhuthu (2004)
- Anniyan (2005)
- Kanchivaram (2008)
- Enthiran (2010) (also cameo appearance as Shah, Mr.Bohra's agent/translator)
- Yaan (2014)
- Lingaa (2014)
- Sometimes (2018)

==== Telugu ====
- Gandeevam (1994)
- Devi Putrudu (2001)
- Baahubali: The Beginning (2015)
- Baahubali 2: The Conclusion (2017)
- Saaho (2019)
- RRR (2022)
- Devara: Part 1 (2024)

==== Kannada ====
- Cheluvi (1992)
- Chinna (1994)

=== As actor ===
==== Tamil ====
- Vikram (1986)
- Enthiran (2010)

==== Malayalam ====
- Aquarium (2022)

== Awards ==
National Film Awards

- 1994 – Best Production Designer – Thenmavin Kombath (Malayalam)
- 1995 – Best Production Designer – Kaalapani (Malayalam)
- 2007 – Best Production Designer – Om Shanti Om (Hindi)
- 2010 – Best Production Designer – Enthiran (Tamil)

Nandi Awards

- 2015 - Nandi Award for Best Art Director - Baahubali

Kerala State Film Awards

- 1994 – Best Art Director – Thenmavin Kombath
- 1995 – Best Art Director – Kaalapani

Tamil Nadu State Film Awards

- 2002 – Best Art Director – Kannathil Muthamittal

Filmfare Awards

- 1994 – Best Art Direction – Gardish
- 2000 – Best Art Direction – Hey Ram
- 2005 – Best Art Direction – Yuva

Filmfare Awards South

- 2005 – Best Art Director – Anniyan
- 2010 – Best Art Director – Enthiran
- 2017 - Best Art Director - Baahubali: The Conclusion

Vijay Awards

- 2014 – Vijay Award for Best Art Director – Lingaa

International Indian Film Academy Awards

- 2007 – Best Art Direction – Om Shanti Om
- 2009 – Best Art Direction – Aladin
- 2010 – Best Art Direction – Enthiran
- 2011 – Best Art Direction – Ra.One
- 2015 - Best Art Direction – Baahubali

South Indian International Movie Awards

- 2012 – Generation Next Award (Sensational Art Director)

Global Indian Film Awards

- 2004 – Best Art Director – Main Hoon Na

Kerala Film Critics Association Awards

- 1994 – Best Art Director – Thenmavin Kombath

International Tamil Film Awards

- 2003 – Best Art Director – Boys

Asianet Film Awards

- 1999 – Best Art Director – Kannezhuthi Pottum Thottu, Megham

Kerala Film Journals' Awards

- 1991 – Best Art Director – Adwaytham

Kerala Janakiya Awards

- 1995 – Best Art Director – Maanthrikam

Kaumudi Awards

- 1994 – Best Art Director – Thenmavin Kombath

Other awards

- 1985 – Best Outgoing Student (University of Madras) award by Government of Tamil Nadu
- Kalavedi Award (Madras) – In recognition of commendable service to the cause of fostering human integration.
- People of Arts Centre (Bombay) – In appreciation of Sazaa-E-Kaala Paani
