= Pondichéry, dernier comptoir des Indes =

- Directed by: Bernard Favre
- Written by: Bernard Favre and Marcel Beaulieu
- Produced by: A Films/Frédéric Marboeuf
- Cinematography: Jean-Marie Dreujou
- Edited by: Emmanuelle Thibault
- Release date: March 26, 1997
- Running time: 92 min.
- Country: France
- Language: French

Pondichéry, dernier comptoir des Indes (original French title) ("Pondicherry, last trading post in India" in English, released as “Last Trading Post in India” ) is a 1997 French drama film set during Pondicherry's independence from France in 1954.

== Plot ==
The fictional film is set during Pondicherry's independence from France in 1954. It tells the story of Stanislas Charvin, a young European male born in India but raised in Marseille, France by his grandmother. Stanislas returns to Pondicherry as the French administration are preparing to leave; he intends to collect his mother’s remains for repatriation to France for burial. While in India, he learns that his mother has not died but has disappeared. Stanislas discovers that she left her husband André for Weber, a half-caste man, and is consequently shunned and despised by her community. During the course of the film, Stanislas meets his father (whom he hates) but reconciles with him before his death.

The film explores the self-discovery of the young 20 year-old Stanislas against the backdrop of the "great departure" as we see several images of boxes and suitcases in the background. The final message to appear before the credits roll makes an explicit connection between the loss of the "comptoirs" in India and the Algerian War: "November 1st, 1954, Pondicherry rejoins India as the Algerian insurrection explodes". The film also depicts Granier (the last French administrator in Pondicherry) shouting "Pondicherry, the capital of nowhere!" as he departs the colony in the final scenes of the production.

== Cast ==
The film stars Frédéric Gorny as Stanislas Charvin, Richard Bohringer as André Charvin, Charles Aznavour as Leo Baumann, Vanessa Lhoste as Clémence, and K. Kaartikeyan as Weber. Frédéric Gorny would receive the “Prix Raimu de la comédie” for his role in the film in 1997.

== Technical notes ==
The sets were designed by noted Indian production designer and art director Thota Tharani.

== Reception ==
The film was largely derided by critics in France. One author (Jackie Assayag) delivers a scathing critique of the film and its "sentimental clichés" in a 1999 book.
