= Swathi Thirunal (film) =

- Poster
- Directed by: Lenin Rajendran
- Screenplay by: Lenin Rajendran
- Starring: Anant Nag; Srividya; Ambika; Ranjini
- Cinematography: Madhu Ambat
- Edited by: Ravi
- Music by: M. B. Sreenivasan
- Production company: Chithranjali Studios
- Distributed by: Seven Arts
- Release date: 4 September 1987
- Running time: 133 minutes
- Country: India
- Language: Malayalam

Swathi Thirunal is a 1987 Indian Malayalam-language biographical film co-written and directed by Lenin Rajendran. The film is based on the life of Swathi Thirunal Rama Varma, the Maharaja of Travancore. It stars Anant Nag in the title role, with Srividya, Nedumudi Venu and Murali in other important roles. The cinematographer was Madhu Ambat.

== Plot ==
The story begins with Gowri Lakshmi Bayi entrusting the four-month-old Swathi Thirunal Rama Varma to the care of the English East India Company whose representative was Col. Munro. Then it cuts to when Swathi Thirunal is sixteen and takes over the reins of Travancore from his aunt Gowri Parvati Bayi. Swathi Thirunal's biography is then shown against the backdrop of the music that he himself has composed. The movie ends with his death in 1846.

== Cast ==
- Anant Nag as Swathi Thirunal Rama Varma (voice dubbed by Venu Nagavally)
- Srividya as Gowri Parvati Bayi
- Nedumudi Venu as Irayimman Thampi
- Murali as Shadkala Govinda Marar
- Ambika as Narayani Panam Pillai Amma Kochamma
- Babu Namboothiri as Diwanji Subbaravu
- Ranjini as Sugandhavalli
- Jagannathan as Vadivelu
- Innocent as Krishna Ravu
- Kaithapram Damodaran Namboothiri as singer
- Ravi Vallathol as singer
- Kanakalatha as Narayani's Thozhi
- Mehboob Sait ( guest role )
- Kuyili as dancer
- Sujatha Thiruvananthapuram
- Anoop as Baby Swathi Thirunal Rama Varma

== Production ==
After Anant Nag's Kannada film Narada Vijaya (1980) was dubbed into Malayalam and performed well in the Kerala box office, the director Lenin Rajendran and cinematographer Madhu Ambat approached him to portray Swathi Thirunal Rama Varma in their biopic of him. Though initially reluctant, he ultimately agreed. Actor Saikumar was initially offered the lead role, but he later made his debut in Ramji Rao Speaking (1989). ( In return, Nag told Rajendran about the work of art director P. Krishnamoorthy whom he had worked with in Hamsageethe and the latter made his debut in Malayalam through this film.

== Soundtrack ==
Swathi Thirunal

Soundtrack album by M. B. Sreenivasan
- Released: 1987
- Length: 60:36
- Label: Tharangini Music
- Producer: K. J. Yesudas

The film's original music was composed by M. B. Sreenivasan. The soundtrack features vocals of several singers including M. Balamuralikrishna, who received a State award for his work.

	Song title	Singer(s)	Raga
1	Pannakendra Sayana	M. Balamuralikrishna, K. J. Yesudas, Neyyattinkara Vasudevan	Raagamaalika (Sankarabharanam, Bhairavi, Revagupti)
2	Alarsara Parithapam	K. J. Yesudas, B. Arundhathi	Surutti
3	Mokshamu Galadha	M. Balamuralikrishna	Saramathi
4	Parama Purusha	K. J. Yesudas, Neyyattinkara Vasudevan	Vasantha
5	Suma Sayaka	B. Arundhathi	Karnataka Kapi
6	Parvathi Nayaka	K. J. Yesudas, K. S. Chithra	Bowli
7	Sarasamukha Sarasija	K. J. Yesudas	Madhyamavati
8	Thillana	Ambilikkuttan	Dhanashree
9	Mamava Sada Janani	Neyyattinkara Vasudevan	Kanada
10	Devanuke Pathi	S. P. Balasubrahmanyam	Darbari Kanada
11	Krupaya Palaya	K. J. Yesudas	Charukesi
12	Jamuna Kinaare	M. Balamuralikrishna	Mishra Pilu
13	Kosalendra	Neyyattinkara Vasudevan	Madhyamavati
14	Chaliye Kunjanamo	K. S. Chithra	Vrindavani sarang

Additional tracks from the movie

	Song title	Singer(s)	Raga
1	Bhaja Bhaja Manasa	M. Balamuralikrishna	Sindhu Bhairavi
2	Entharo	M. Balamuralikrishna	Shree
3	Mamava Sada Varade	S. Janaki	Nāttai Kurinji
4	Omanathinkal Kidavo	S. Janaki	Kurinji
5	Omanathinkal Kidavo	B. Arundhathi	Kurinji
6	Praananaathan	B. Arundhathi	Kambhoji
7	Sa Ni Dha Sa (Swarangal)	Chorus	
8	Anjaneya	K. J. Yesudas	Saveri
9	Anantha	Venmani Haridas	

== Awards ==
Kerala State Film Awards:

- Special Jury Award – Lenin Rajendran
- Special Jury Award – M.B Sreenivasan
- Best Play Back Singer – M. Balamuralikrishna
- Best Art Director – P. Krishnamoorthy
