= National Film Award for Best Production Design =

Indian film award

- National award for contributions to Indian Cinema
- Sponsored by: National Film Development Corporation of India
- Formerly called: National Film Award for Best Art Direction (1979–2010)
- Rewards: Rajat Kamal (Silver Lotus); ₹2,00,000
- First award: 1979
- Most recent winner: Nitin Zihani Choudhary, Kalki 2898 AD (2024)

The National Film Award for Best Production Design is one of the National Film Awards presented annually by the National Film Development Corporation of India. It is one of the several awards presented for feature films and awarded with Rajat Kamal (Silver Lotus).

The award was instituted in 1979, at the 27th National Film Awards as National Film Award for Best Art Direction, and awarded annually for films produced in the year across the country, in all Indian languages; Hindi (18 awards), Tamil (6 awards), Malayalam (6 awards), Bengali (4 awards), Kannada, Urdu, English, Marathi (two each), Telugu, Gujarati, Punjabi, Konkani (one Each).

The award renamed as "National Film Award for Best Production Design" from the 57th National Film Awards in 2011.

== Multiple winners ==
- 4 Wins: Nitin Chandrakant Desai, Samir Chanda & Sabu Cyril
- 3 Wins: Nitish Roy & P. Krishnamoorthy
- 2 Wins: Jayoo Patwardhan, Thota Tharani & Indranil Ghosh

== Recipients ==
Award includes 'Rajat Kamal' (Silver Lotus) and cash prize. Following are the award winners over the years:

List of award recipients, showing the year (award ceremony), film(s) and language(s)
| Year | Recipient(s) | Film(s) | Language(s) | Refs. |
|---|---|---|---|---|
| 1979 (27th) | Jayoo Patwardhan | 22 June 1897 | Marathi | |
| 1980 (28th) | Meera Lakhia | Bhavni Bhavai | Gujarati | |
| 1981 (29th) | Manzur | Umrao Jaan | Urdu | |
| 1982 (30th) | Nitish Roy | Kharij | Bengali | |
| 1983 (31st) | Nitish Roy | Mandi | Hindi | |
| 1984 (32nd) | Nachiket Patwardhan | Utsav | Hindi | |
| 1984 (32nd) | Jayoo Patwardhan | Utsav | Hindi | |
| 1985 (33rd) | Sham Bhutker | Rao Saheb | Hindi | |
| 1986 (34th) | P. Krishnamoorthy | Madhvacharya | Kannada | |
| 1987 (35th) | Thota Tharani | Nayakan | Tamil | |
| 1988 (36th) | Thota Vaikuntam | Daasi | Telugu | |
| 1989 (37th) | P. Krishnamoorthy | Oru Vadakkan Veeragatha | Malayalam | |
| 1990 (38th) | Nitish Roy | Lekin... | Hindi | |
| 1991 (39th) | Samir Chanda | Rukmavati Ki Haveli | Hindi | |
| 1992 (40th) | Samir Chanda | Rudaali | Hindi | |
| 1993 (41st) | Suresh Sawant | Muhafiz | • Hindi • Urdu | |
| 1994 (42nd) | Sabu Cyril | Thenmavin Kombath | Malayalam | |
| 1995 (43rd) | Sabu Cyril | Kalapani | Malayalam | |
| 1996 (44th) | Thota Tharani | Indian | Tamil | |
| 1997 (45th) | Ramesh Desai | Thaayi Saheba | Kannada | |
| 1998 (46th) | Nitin Chandrakant Desai | Dr. Babasaheb Ambedkar | English | |
| 1999 (47th) | Nitin Chandrakant Desai | Hum Dil De Chuke Sanam | Hindi | |
| 2000 (48th) | P. Krishnamoorthy | Bharati | Tamil | |
| 2001 (49th) | Nitin Chandrakant Desai | Lagaan | Hindi | |
| 2002 (50th) | Nitin Chandrakant Desai | Devdas | Hindi | |
| 2003 (51st) | Indranil Ghosh | Chokher Bali | Bengali | |
| 2003 (51st) | Sharmishta Roy | Meenaxi: A Tale of Three Cities | Hindi | |
| 2004 (52nd) | Samir Chanda | Netaji Subhas Chandra Bose: The Forgotten Hero | • English • Hindi | |
| 2005 (53rd) | C. B. More | Taj Mahal: An Eternal Love Story | Hindi | |
| 2006 (54th) | Rashid Rangrez | Waris Shah: Ishq Daa Waaris | Punjabi | |
| 2007 (55th) | Sabu Cyril | Om Shanti Om | Hindi | |
| 2008 (56th) | Gautam Sen | Firaaq | Hindi | |
| 2009 (57th) | Samir Chanda | Delhi-6 | Hindi | |
| 2010 (58th) | Sabu Cyril | Enthiran | Tamil | |
| 2011 (59th) | Indranil Ghosh | Noukadubi | Bengali | |
| 2012 (60th) | Boontawee 'Thor' Taweepasas | Vishwaroopam | Tamil | |
| 2012 (60th) | Lalgudi N. Ilayaraja | Vishwaroopam | Tamil | |
| 2013 (61st) | Ashim Ahluwalia | Miss Lovely | Hindi | |
| 2013 (61st) | Tabasheer Zutshi | Miss Lovely | Hindi | |
| 2013 (61st) | Parichit Paralkar | Miss Lovely | Hindi | |
| 2014 (62nd) | Aparna Raina | Nachom-ia Kumpasar | Konkani | |
| 2015 (63rd) | Shriram Iyengar | Bajirao Mastani | Hindi | |
| 2015 (63rd) | Saloni Dhatrak | Bajirao Mastani | Hindi | |
| 2015 (63rd) | Sujeet Sawant | Bajirao Mastani | Hindi | |
| 2016 (64th) | Subrata Chakraborthy | 24 | Tamil | |
| 2016 (64th) | Shreyas Khedekar | 24 | Tamil | |
| 2016 (64th) | Amit Ray | 24 | Tamil | |
| 2017 (65th) | Santhosh Raman | Take Off | Malayalam | |
| 2018 (66th) | Vinesh Banglan | Kammara Sambhavam | Malayalam | |
| 2019 (67th) | Nilesh Wagh | Anandi Gopal | Marathi | |
| 2019 (67th) | Sunil Nigwekar | Anandi Gopal | Marathi | |
| 2020 (68th) | Anees Nadodi | Kappela | Malayalam | |
| 2021 (69th) | Dmitri Malich-Konkov | Sardar Udham | Hindi | |
| 2021 (69th) | Mansi Dhruv Mehta | Sardar Udham | Hindi | |
| 2022 (70th) | Ananda Addhya | Aparajito | Bengali | |
| 2023 (71st) | Mohandas | 2018 | Malayalam | |
| 2024 (72nd) | Nitin Zihani Choudhary | Kalki 2898 AD | Telugu | |
