= Tamil Nadu State Film Award for Best Art Director =

Indian film award

The Tamil Nadu State Film Award for Best Art Director is given by the state government as part of its annual Tamil Nadu State Film Awards for Tamil (Kollywood) films.

== The list ==
List of winners and nominated work
Year	Recipient	Work
1988	B. Nagarajan	Paati Sollai Thattadhey
1989	Mohanam	Pudhea Paadhai
1990	B. Chalam	Ulagam Pirandhadhu Enakkaga, Nadigan
1991	Thotta Tharani	Thalapathi
1992	B. Chalam	Annaamalai, Pandiyan
1993	B. Chalam	Walter Vetrivel
1994	Thotta Tharani	Kaadhalan
1995	Prabakharan	Pullakuttikaran
1996	D. Rajan	Karuppu Roja
1997	GK	Arunachalam
1998	Mohan Rajendran	Simmaraasi
1999	P. Krishnamoorthy	Sangamam
2000	Mani Raj P. Krishnamoorthy	Thenali; Vaanavil
2001	Prabakharan	Poovellam Un Vasam
2002	Sabu Cyril	Kannathil Muthamittal
2003	Kathir	Thirumalai
2004	Anand Sai	New
2005	Thotta Tharani	Chandramukhi, Sringaram
2006	P. Krishnamoorthy	Imsai Arasan 23m Pulikesi
2007	Thotta Tharani	Sivaji
2008	Rajeevan	Vaaranam Aayiram
2009	V. Selvakumar	Peraanmai
2010	T. Santhanam	Aayirathil Oruvan
2011	D. R. K. Kiran	Ko
2012	C.S. Balachandar	Paradesi
2013	Mahi	Moondru Per Moondru Kaadhal
2014	T. Santhanam	Kaaviya Thalaivan
2015	Prabhaharan	Pasanga 2
2016	A. John Britto	Ilami
2017	A. K. Muthu	Andava Kaanom
2018	Vinoth Rajkumar	Seethakaathi
2019	C. S. Balachandar	Dharmaprabhu
2020	Ayyappan	Sandakkari
2021	T Ramalingam	Karnan
2022	Thotta Tharani	Ponniyin Selvan: I

== See also ==
- Tamil cinema
- Cinema of India
