= Sujith =

Sujith is a given name. Notable persons with this name include the following people:

- Sujith Ariyapala, Sri Lankan cricketer
- Sujith Fernando, Sri Lankan cricketer
- Sujith Sanjaya Perera, Sri Lanka politician
- Sujith Sarang (born 1985), Indian cinematographer
- Sujith Shankar, Indian actor
- Sujith Somasunder (born 1972), Indian cricketer
- Sujith Vaassudev (born 1973), Indian cinematographer
