= Sayahnam =

- Directed by: R. Sarath
- Screenplay by: M. R.sarath
- Story by: R. Sarath
- Produced by: M. S. Nazeer
- Starring: O. Madhavan; Jomol
- Cinematography: M. J. Radhakrishnan
- Edited by: Beena Paul
- Music by: Perumbavoor G. Raveendranath
- Production company: Arfa Arts
- Release date: 10 September 2000
- Country: India
- Language: Malayalam

Sayahnam (English: Twilight) is a 2000 Malayalam feature film that marks the directorial debut of R. Sarath, who also wrote the screenplay. The film is a drama centred on the environmental and anti-nuclear issue in India. It stars O. Madhavan, Gomathi Mahadevan, Ebrahim Kutty and Alex Kadavil. It won seven Kerala State Film Awards and two National Film Awards.

== Plot ==
An old man, who is a writer, is proud of his son who is a scientist, but upset about the country's involvement in nuclear tests. He finds himself increasingly isolated as his own son celebrates the nuclear advances made in India

== Cast ==
- O. Madhavan as Sakhav KK
- Gomathi Mahadevan as Bharathi, wife of Sakhav
- P. I. Ibrahim Kutty as Siddharthan, Sakhav's elder son
- Shari as Salini, Siddharthan's wife
- Jomol as Volga
- Alex kadavil as Ramachandran
- Remya Nambeesan as Amala, daughter of Siddharthan and Salini

== Awards ==
National Film Awards

- Indira Gandhi Award for Best Debut Film of a Director - R. Sarath (film director) and M. S. Nazeer (film producer)

Kerala State Film Awards

- Best Film - Sayahnam
- Best Actor - O. Madhavan
- Best Story - R. Sarath
- Best Dubbing Artist - Gopalakrishnan
- Best Male Singer - Vidhu Prathap
- Best Editing - Beena Paul
- Best Art Direction - A. V. Gokuldas
