= Sujith Ariyapala =

Sri Lankan cricketer

Sujith Ariyapala was a Sri Lankan cricketer. He was a right-arm off-break bowler who played for Moors Sports Club.

Having appeared in a miscellaneous match for the side ten seasons previously, Ariyapala made a single first-class appearance for the side, during the 1990–91 season, against Colts Cricket Club. In the only innings in which he batted, he scored a duck.

He took two wickets from 21 overs with the ball, conceding 53 runs.
