= Nitish Roy =

Indian film director

- Occupations: Art director, production designer, costume designer, set director, Director
- Awards: 1983: National Film Award for Best Art Direction: Kharij; 1984: National Film Award for Best Art Direction: Mandi; 1991: National Film Award for Best Art Direction: Lekin; 1991: Filmfare Best Art Direction Award: Ghayal
- Website: Official website

Nitish Roy is an Indian film art director, production designer, and costume designer in Hindi cinema and a Bengali Film Director, who is also known for his work with art cinema directors, Shyam Benegal, Mrinal Sen and Govind Nihlani, Hindi mainstream cinema, directors like Rajkumar Santoshi, as well as international directors like Mira Nair and Gurinder Chadha. His work (production design, art direction) for Oscar winning Hollywood blockbuster Gladiator fetched international fame for him. Beside art direction, production design and film direction he is an internationally acclaimed architect who has created several film cities such has Ramoji Film City (Hyderabad) Innovative Film city (Bengaluru), Prayag Film City (Kolkata) and several theme parks, amusement parks, museum not only in India but also in countries like Singapore etc.

== Filmography ==
As production designer/ art director

- Kharij (1982)
- Mandi (1983)
- Party (1984)
- Khandhar (1984)
- Trikaal (1985)
- Tasveer Apni Apni (1985)
- Genesis (1986)
- New Delhi Times (1986)
- Ek Pal (1986)
- Aghaat (1986)
- Susman (1987)
- Tamas (1987)
- Bharat Ek Khoj (1988)
- Salaam Bombay! (1988)
- Parinda (1989)
- Drishti (1990)
- Ghayal (1990)
- Jo Jeeta Wohi Sikandar (1992)
- Suraj Ka Satvan Ghoda (1993)
- Nightfall (2000)
- Pukar (2000)
- Gladiator (2000)
- Lajja (2001)
- 23rd March 1931: Shaheed (2002)
- Maine Gandhi Ko Nahin Mara (2005)
- Fanaa (2006)
- Bride and Prejudice (2004)
- Halla Bol (2008)
- Good Luck! (2008)
- Praktan (2016)
- Mujib - The Making of a Nation (2022)

As Director

- Ak poshla brishti
- Tobu mone rekho
- Jamai no 1
- Heartbeat - Hindi
- Gosainbaganer Bhoot (Bengali) (2011) - Director
- Jole Jongole (2012)
- Mahakash Kando (Bengali) (2012) - Director
- Tadanto (2015)
- Buddhu Bhutum (Bengali) (2017) - Director

== Awards ==
- 1983: National Film Award for Best Art Direction: Kharij
- 1984: National Film Award for Best Art Direction: Mandi
- 1991: National Film Award for Best Art Direction: Lekin...
- 1991: Filmfare Best Art Direction Award: Ghayal
