= Vachanam =

- Directed by: Lenin Rajendran
- Written by: Lenin Rajendran
- Produced by: Dr. Jayan Titty George
- Starring: Jayaram; Suresh Gopi; Charuhasan; Sithara
- Cinematography: Madhu Ambat
- Edited by: V. R. K Prasad
- Music by: Mohan Sithara
- Release date: 16 March 1990
- Running time: 122 minutes
- Country: India
- Language: Malayalam

Vachanam (transl. The word) is a 1990 Malayalam-language mystery film directed by Lenin Rajendran. The film stars Jayaram, Suresh Gopi, Sithara and Charuhasan. The film has a musical score composed by Mohan Sithara. The art direction is done by P. Krishnamoorthy.

== Plot ==
The film starts with Ravi (Suresh Gopi) is attacked by a group of people on a rainy night. His friend Gopan (Jayaram) finds Ravi unconscious on the road and seeks help from the Police. By the time Gopan arrives with the police force, Ravi is missing. The story then flashes back to a few months back when Ravi followed by Gopan arrives at Shanthigiri monastery for research. Vishnuji, the spiritual head is running the monastery with the help of aid from foreigners. While Ravi idiolizes Vishnuji, Gopan only sees in him a fraud. Both the young men become friendly with Vishnuji's (Charuhasan) private secretary, Maya (Sithara). Very soon, Ravi and Maya find themselves attracted to each other, while Gopan helps them express themselves and start their relationship together. Aryadevi (Sreevidya), another spiritual leader visits Shanthigiri and it is revealed that she is Ravi's surrogate mother. Also it is revealed that Arya Devi was in an intimate relationship with Vishnuji and she accuses Vishnuji of pimping her to foreigners to collect money to start Shanthigiri monastery. Arya Devi requests Ravi to come back to their monastery, but Ravi rejects the idea. Back to present, a shrewd Police Officer (Thilakan) is assigned to investigate Ravi's's disappearance. After lot of revelations from many characters, he finds that Ravi had come to know about malpractices going on in the monastery including prostitution and had threatened Vishnuji to bring him down. Also Maya confesses to having overhearing Vishnuji's conversation with her father about the murder of Ravi. Vishnuji gets arrested, but his lawyer (Nedumudi Venu) establishes in court that Ravi is alive and is in hiding, while Gopan is a mental patient and can't be trusted. Finally the Court ends up acquitting Vishnuji of all charges and he goes out to a roaring welcome from his supporters. Disgusted with the failure of the judicial system, Gopan decides to take the matter into his own hands and doles out his own version of Justice.

== Cast ==
- Jayaram as Gopan
- Suresh Gopi as Ravi
- Thilakan as Police Officer
- Charuhasan as Vishnuji
- Sithara as Maya
- Sreevidya as Aryadevi
- Nedumudi Venu as Lawyer
- Thilakan
- Nedumudi Venu
- Mamukkoya
- Sreevidya
- Shivaji Guruvayoor
- Babu Namboothiri
- T. P. Madhavan

== Soundtrack ==
The film had musical score composed by Mohan Sithara.

1. Neermizhipeeliyil : K.J. Yesudas
