= Tamil Nadu State Film Awards =

Group of awards

- Awarded for: Honouring the Excellence and achievements in Tamil cinema
- Sponsored by: Department of Arts and Culture (Tamil Nadu Govt) Iyal Isai Nadaga Mandram
- Country: India
- Presented by: Government of Tamil Nadu
- Status: Active
- First award: 1967
- Final award: 2022

Tamil Nadu State Film Awards are given for excellence in Tamil cinema in India. They were originally given annually by the Government of Tamil Nadu to recognize the best talents in the South Indian film industry. The awards were decided by a committee headed by a judge. The awards were first given in 1967 but discontinued after 1970. The awards were resumed in 1977 and continued till 1982. The awards were not given in the years 1971 to 1976. However, in the year 1977, the awards for Best Actress and Best Actor were announced for the years 1971 to 1976 by way of honorary certificates by the government led by the then chief minister M. G. Ramachandran. Since 1988, the awards were regularly given until discontinued after 2008.

After winning the election for the Producers Council of Tamil Cinema, the chairman Vishal revealed that he would approach the government to reinstate the awards. The awards were reinstated in July 2017 after the government announced the wins for 2009–2014. After a gap of seven years, the awards for the year 2015 were announced in March 2024. Then, in February 2026, awards were announced for the years 2016–2022.

== Record Winners ==
The most leading wins by the artists of the respective categories.

Most awards
| Image | Recipient | Award | No. of Awards |
|---|---|---|---|
| | Vikraman | Best Director | 3 |
| | Kamal Haasan | Best Actor | 8 |
| | Rajinikanth | Best Actor Special Prize (Jury) | 2 |
| | Suriya | Best Actor Special Prize (Jury) | 2 |
| | Jyothika | Best Actress | 5 |
| | S. Janaki | Best Female Playback Singer | 6 |
| | Bhanupriya | Best Actress Special Prize (Jury) | 2 |
| | Nassar | Best Supporting Actor | 3 |
| | Saranya Ponvannan | Best Supporting Actress | 2 |
| | Prakash Raj | Best Villain | 5 |
| | Vadivelu | Best Comedian | 6 |
| | A. R. Rahman | Best Music Director | 7 |

== Awards ==
Awards are given in the following categories. Follow the links for lists of the award winners, year by year.

=== Creative Awards ===
- Best Film: since 1967
- Best Director: since 1967
- Best Family Film:2000 & 2001; since 2006 - 2008
- Best Film Portraying Women in a Good Light: since 1994
- Best Actor: since 1967
- Best Actress: since 1967
- Best Supporting Actor: 1968 to 1970; since 2000
- Best Supporting Actress: 1968 to 1970; since 2000
- Best Villain: since 1995
- Best Comedian: 1980 to 1982; since 1995
- Best Child Artist: 1969 and 1970; 1977 and 1978; 1990; since 1994
- Best Music Director: 1968 to 1970; 1977 to 1982; since 1988
- Best Male Playback Singer: 1968 to 1970; 1977 to 1982; since 1988
- Best Female Playback Singer: 1968 to 1970; 1977 to 1982; since 1988

=== Technical Awards ===
- Best Stunt Coordinator: 1970; 1982; since 1988
- Best Art Director: since 1988
- Best Cinematographer: 1968 to 1970; 1977 to 1982; since 1988
- Best Choreographer: since 1988
- Best Audiographer: since 1988
- Best Lyricist: 1968 to 1970; 1977 to 1982; since 1988
- Best Male Dubbing Artist: since 2000
- Best Female Dubbing Artist: since 2000
- Best Editor: 1980 to 1982; since 1988
- Best Storywriter: 1968 to 1970; 1977 to 1982; since 1988
- Best Dialogue Writer: 1968 to 1970; 1977 to 1982; since 1988
- Best Make-up Artist: since 1993
- Best Costume Designer: since 1993

=== Special awards ===
- Tamil Nadu State Film Award Special Prize: since 1970
- Tamil Nadu State Film Honorary Award: since 1988

=== Retired Awards ===
- Best Male Debut – Karthik for Alaigal Oivathillai: 1981
- Best Female Debut – Radha for Alaigal Oivathillai: 1981

== List of frequent winners ==
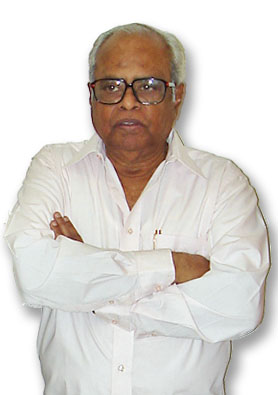
K Balachander

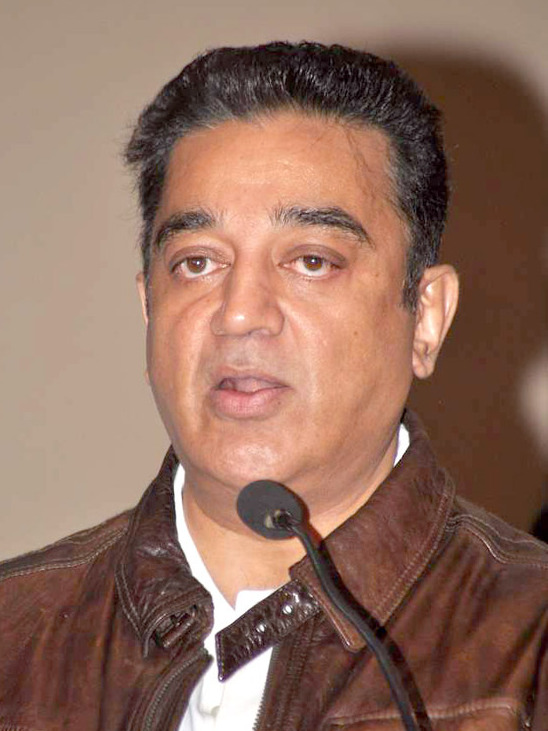
Kamal Haasan

K. Balachander (14) remains to be the most individual wins by an artist in TN State Film Awards till date followed by his student Kamal Haasan with eleven Wins.

List of winners of Tamil Nadu State Film Awards
- Artist: Wins
- K. Balachander: 14
- Kamal Haasan: 11
- Suriya: 10
- Prakash Raj: 10
- Bharathiraja: 9
- Vikraman: 9
- Rajinikanth: 8
- R. B. Choudary: 7
- Manorama: 7
- A R Rahman: 7
- S. Janaki: 6
- Jyothika: 5

== Most awarded films ==
A.R. Murugadoss Directional Ghajini, Starring Suriya and Asin still hold the Record of Most Number of Wins by a Film.

List of films with most number of wins
| Film | Year | Wins |
|---|---|---|
| Ghajini | 2005 | 9 |
| Alaigal Oivathillai | 1981 | 8 |
| Kannathil Muthamittal | 2002 | 7 |
| Chinna Thambi | 1991 | 7 |
| Kumki | 2012 | 7 |
| Kaaviya Thalaivan | 2014 | 7 |
| 36 Vayadhinile | 2015 | 7 |
| Vada Chennai | 2018 | 7 |
| Soorarai Pottru | 2020 | 7 |
| Jai Bhim | 2021 | 7 |

== See also ==
- Cinema of India
