= List of highest-grossing Indian films in overseas markets =

Indian films have been released in overseas markets since the late 1940s. Since the 1990s, the primary target audience for Indian films in overseas markets has been the South Asian diaspora. A number of films have found success among non-South Asian audiences, especially in places such as the Soviet Union, China, Middle East and Africa.

The first Indian film to have a worldwide release was from 1952 (Aan, directed by Mehboob Khan). In the 1950s, Indian films saw success in a handful of regions. At the time, the most significant market for Indian films was the Soviet Union, gaining considerable success and occasionally leading to Indian-Soviet co-productions. In the 1950s and 1960s, the Indian film industry also expanded into China and East Africa, which, after the Soviet Union, accounted for some of the largest shares of overseas revenue. Since the collapse of the Soviet Union in 1991, the most significant market has been the South Asian diaspora. China, India's geographic neighbour and the world's second largest film market (after the United States), has seen growing success for Indian films since the beginning of the 21st century.

== History ==
The first Indian film to have a commercial release in an overseas territory was Dharti Ke Lal (1946), directed by Khwaja Ahmad Abbas and based on the Bengal famine of 1943. It was released in the Soviet Union in 1949. The first Indian film to have a worldwide release in many countries was Aan (1952), directed by Mehboob Khan, and starring Dilip Kumar and Nimmi. It was subtitled in 17 languages and released in 28 countries, including the United Kingdom, United States, France, and Japan, earning a considerable profit from overseas. Mehboob Khan's Academy Award-nominated Mother India (1957) was an unprecedented success in overseas markets, including Europe, Russia, the Eastern Bloc, French territories, and Latin America.

In the 1950s, Hindi and Egyptian films were generally more popular than Hollywood films in East Africa. By the 1960s, the region was one of the largest overseas export markets for Indian films, accounting for about 20-50% of global earnings for many Indian films.

=== Soviet Union ===
Up until the 1980s, the largest overseas market for Indian films was the Soviet Union. After Dharti Ke Lal, the first Indian film to become a blockbuster at the Soviet box office was Awaara (1951), directed by Raj Kapoor and written by Khwaja Ahmad Abbas, released in the Soviet Union in 1954. Indian films had the strongest presence in the Soviet foreign blockbuster charts for four decades. 300 Indian films were released in the Soviet Union, most of which were Hindi films. Among the foreign films that sold more than 20 million tickets in the Soviet Union, 50 were Indian films, the highest from any nation, compared to 41 Hollywood films. Indian films were routinely released with hundreds of prints in the Soviet Union, with the most popular Indian films releasing with more than a thousand prints there.

The highest-grossing Indian film in the Soviet Union was Disco Dancer (1982), (Note: Disco Dancer in Soviet Union: US$75.85 million (Note: Disco Dancer: 60 million Soviet rubles in 1984, 0.791 rubles per US dollar in 1984) (₹9.428 billion) (Note: 12.43 Indian rupees per US dollar in 1984) in 1984) written by Rahi Masoom Raza and starring actor Mithun Chakraborty. In terms of footfalls, the only Indian films estimated to have sold 100 million tickets overseas were Awaara and Disco Dancer in the Soviet Union. Indian films were very popular in Soviet Union at the time, routinely opening to packed houses. However, the Soviet Union collapsed in 1991, bringing an end to Indian cinema's largest overseas market at the time. The decline of Russian cinema in the post-Soviet era led to Indian films largely disappearing from Russian cinemas by the mid-1990s.

=== China ===
In China, some of the Indian films to gain commercial success there during the 1970s–1980s included Awaara, Tahir Hussain's Caravan (1971), Noorie (1979), and Disco Dancer.

After Indian films declined in the country, it took decades before Tahir Hussain's son Aamir Khan opened up the Chinese market for Indian films in the early 21st century. His Academy Award nominated Lagaan (2001) became the first Indian film to have a nationwide release there. When 3 Idiots released in China, the country was only the 15th largest film market, partly due to China's widespread pirate DVD distribution at the time. However, it was the pirate market that introduced 3 Idiots to most Chinese audiences, becoming a cult hit in the country. It became China's 12th favourite film of all time, according to ratings on Chinese film review site Douban, with only one domestic Chinese film (Farewell My Concubine) ranked higher. Aamir Khan gained a large growing Chinese fanbase as a result. By 2013, China grew to become the world's second largest film market (after the United States), paving the way for Aamir Khan's Chinese box office success, starting with Dhoom 3 (2013).

PK (2014) was the first Indian film to collect ₹2 billion overseas, and Dangal (2016) is the first Indian film to exceed ₹10 billion and $100 million overseas, including ¥1.299 billion ($196.89 million) from China. Dangal became the 16th highest-grossing film in China, the fifth highest-grossing non-English language film worldwide, and the highest-grossing non-English foreign film in any market. His next film, the Zaira Wasim starrer Secret Superstar (2017), broke Dangal's record for the highest-grossing opening weekend by an Indian film, cementing Aamir Khan's status as a superstar in China, and as "a king of the Chinese box office". Salman Khan's Bajrangi Bhaijaan and Irrfan Khan's Hindi Medium also became blockbusters in China during early 2018.

=== South Asian diaspora ===
Since the 1990s, the largest overseas market for Indian cinema has been the South Asian diaspora. South Asians in the United Kingdom were the first major diaspora market, with Indian film releases in the United Kingdom dating back to the 1950s.

The diaspora market grew significantly in the early 1990s, with the popularity of Shah Rukh Khan largely credited for popularizing the trend of Indian films targeting overseas NRI audiences. After substantial overseas success from the Shah Rukh Khan-starrer Darr (1993) and the Madhuri Dixit-Salman Khan-starrer Hum Aapke Hain Koun (1994), the biggest overseas breakthrough came with Dilwale Dulhania Le Jayenge (1995), starring Shah Rukh Khan and Kajol as NRIs in love. Afterwards, Indian films followed a trend of releasing worldwide with an increasing number of screens. The Shah Rukh Khan-starrer Dil Se.. (1998) was the first Indian film to enter the United Kingdom's top 10 box office charts. Diaspora audiences in the United States and United Kingdom accounted for 55% of overseas ticket sales for films such as Kuch Kuch Hota Hai (1998) and Taal (1999). In 2000, the overseas export market for Indian films was worth $100 million annually. The Naseeruddin Shah-starrer Monsoon Wedding (2001) crossed ₹100 crore overseas, followed by the Shah Rukh Khan-starrer My Name Is Khan (2010) and then the Aamir Khan-starrer 3 Idiots (2009) in 2011. Shah Rukh Khan also holds the record for having starred in the annual highest-grossing Hindi film in overseas markets for 15 individual years, the highest for any actor, with the latest being Pathaan (2023).

== Highest-grossing films ==
The following list of films is sorted in terms of US dollars (not adjusted for inflation), the standard6 currency used to measure box office performance for overseas markets.

*	Denotes films still running in theaters

Rank	Title	Overseas gross	Year	Ref.	Original language	
1	Dangal	$258,000,000	2016	(Note: Dangal overseas gross – US$238.114 million (₹1,520.55 crore): China – US$196.89 million (₹1,243.44 crore); Taiwan – ₹361.2 million (US$5.55 million); Hong Kong – ₹222.7 million (US$3.42 million); South Korea – ₩906.42 million – US$826,567 (₹6 crore); Japan – ₹30 million (US$438,663.83); Turkey – US$428,201 (₹3 crore); Other territories – US$30.493 million (₹2.072 billion))	Hindi	
2	Secret Superstar	$136,000,000	2017	(Note: Secret Superstar overseas gross – US$140 million (₹9.4 crore): China – US$124.4 million (₹8.632 billion); Hong Kong – HK$14 million – US$1,786,056 (₹118 million); Russia – US$6,682 (₹440,000); Other territories – ₹650 million (US$9.98 million))	Hindi	
3	Bajrangi Bhaijaan	$82,000,000	2015	(Note: Bajrangi Bhaijaan: ₹524.05 crore (US$82 million), or with inflation ₹5,240.5 million (equivalent to ₹8.6 billion or US$92 million in 2026): China – US$48 million (₹313 crore); Other territories – US$30.9 million (₹211.05 crore))	Hindi	
4	Disco Dancer	$76,000,000	1982		Hindi	
5	Ramayana: Part 1 *	$60,109,000	2026		Hindi	
6	Baahubali 2: The Conclusion	$57,800,000	2017		Hindi	Telugu
7	Dhurandhar: The Revenge	$51,000,000	2026		Hindi	
8	Andhadhun	$49,000,000	2018		Hindi	
9	Pathaan	$49,000,000	2023		Hindi	
10	PK	$47,352,000	2014	(Note: PK: US$53.4 million, ₹3.65 billion (equivalent to ₹6.4 billion or US$68 million in 2026))	Hindi	
11	Jawan	$47,000,000	2023			
12	RRR	$40,300,000	2022		Telugu	
13	Hindi Medium	$36,730,000	2017	(Note: Hindi Medium – US$36.2 million (₹235.65 crore): China – US$34 million (₹2,214 million); Other territories – US$2.2 million (₹142.5 million))	Hindi	
14	Dhurandhar	$32,400,000	2025		Hindi	
15	Dhoom 3	$31,800,000	2013		Hindi	
16	Pushpa 2: The Rule	$30,800,000	2024		Telugu	
17	Kalki 2898 AD	$30,700,000	2024		Telugu	
18	Animal	$30,500,000	2023		Hindi	
19	Dilwale	$30,200,000	2015	(Note: Dilwale: US$30.2 million, ₹1.94 billion (equivalent to ₹3.2 billion or US$34 million in 2026))	Hindi	
20	Sultan	$29,460,000	2016		Hindi	
21	Bobby	$29,400,000	1973	(Note: See List of highest-grossing films in the Soviet Union § Highest-grossing foreign films)	Hindi	
22	Padmaavat	$29,250,000	2018		Hindi	
23	Jailer 2 *	$29,000,000	2026		Tamil	
24	Barood	$28,200,000	1976		Hindi	
24	Sholay	$28,200,000	1975	(Note: Sholay in the Soviet Union (1979 release) – $28.2 million (Note: See List of highest-grossing films in the Soviet Union § Highest-grossing foreign films.) (₹23 crore))	Hindi	
26	Jagir	$28,010,000	1984	(Note: Jagir in the Soviet Union – 38 million admissions. This was equivalent to approximately 19 million Soviet rubles ($28.01 million, ₹353.23 million) in 1986, or $82 million (₹6.087 billion) adjusted for inflation in 2017.)	Hindi	
27	KGF: Chapter 2	$27,500,000	2022		Kannada	
28	3 Idiots	$26,800,000	2009		Hindi	
29	Seeta Aur Geeta	$25,900,000	1972		Hindi	
30	Awaara	$25,830,000	1951	(Note: Awaara – $25.83 million (₹141.7 million): Soviet Union – $16.97 million (₹96.3 billion); Initial run – 29 million руб ($7.25 million, (Note: 4 Soviet rubles per US dollar from 1950 to 1960) ₹34.5 million) (Note: 4.7619 Indian rupees per US dollar from 1950 to 1965) in 1954; Re-runs – 8.75 million руб (Note: 35 million re-run admissions up until 1964-1966, average Soviet ticket price of 25 kopecks in the mid-1960s) – $9.72 million (Note: 0.9 SUR per US$ from 1961 to 1971) (₹4.63 crore); China – CN¥14.8 million – $8.86 million (₹72.2 million) (Note: See Awaara § Box office))	Hindi	
31	Hichki	$25,000,000	2018	(Note: Hichki overseas gross: China – US$21.83 million (₹1,531.3 million); Hong Kong – HK$2,869,318 – US$366,054 (₹2.53 crore); Taiwan – NT$3,595,273 – US$119,238 (₹74 lakh); Russia – US$20,157 (₹13.8 lakh); Other territories – ₹173 million (US$2.53 million))	Hindi	
32	Leo	$23,900,000	2023		Tamil	
33	Jailer	$23,800,000	2023		Tamil	
34	Dunki	$23,681,130	2023		Hindi	
35	My Name Is Khan	$23,500,000	2010		Hindi	
36	Monsoon Wedding	$22,450,000	2001	(Note: Monsoon Wedding – US$22.45 million, which in Indian rupees was ₹1,100.1 million (equivalent to ₹4.8 billion or US$51 million in 2026).: United States – $13,885,966; Other territories – $8,564,778)	Hindi	
37	Mera Naam Joker	$22,130,000	1970	(Note: Mera Naam Joker in the Soviet Union – Released in three parts, with the first part drawing 29 million admissions, the second part 22.6 million, and the final part 21.5 million, adding up to 73.1 million admissions. This was equivalent to approximately 18.28 million Soviet rubles ($22.13 million, ₹16.81 crore) at the time, or $170 million (₹1,256 crore) adjusted for inflation in 2017.)	Hindi	
38	2.0	$22,000,000	2018		Tamil	
39	Sanju	$21,500,000	2018		Hindi	
40	Rocky Aur Rani Kii Prem Kahaani	$21,000,000	2023		Hindi	
41	Ponniyin Selvan: I	$20,700,000	2022		Tamil	
42	Chennai Express	$20,649,000	2013		Hindi	
43	Adventures of Ali-Baba and the Forty Thieves	$20,500,000	1980	(Note: See Adventures of Ali-Baba and the Forty Thieves (film) § Box office)	Hindi	
44	Tiger Zinda Hai	$20,300,000	2017		Hindi	
45	Coolie	$20,270,000	2025		Tamil	
46	Saiyaara	$19,178,000	2025		Hindi	
47	Toilet: Ek Prem Katha	$18,880,000	2017	(Note: Toilet: Ek Prem Katha – US$18.88 million (₹128.34 crore): China – US$14.38 million (₹977.8 million); Other territories – US$4.5 million (₹301.6 million))	Hindi	
48	Thugs of Hindostan	$18,670,000	2018	(Note: Thugs of Hindostan: China – CN¥62 million – $9.37 million (₹65.21 crore); Other territories – $9.5 million (₹69 crore))	Hindi	
49	Mom	$18,670,000	2017		Hindi	
50	The Greatest of All Time	$18,500,000	2024		Tamil	

== Highest-grossing films by market ==
Market	Title	Gross	Year	Ref.
Asia
Bahrain Kuwait Oman Qatar	Jawan	US$5,300,000	2023	
Bangladesh	Jawan	US$350,000	2023	
China	Dangal	CN¥1,299,320,000	2017	
Hong Kong	Dangal	HK$27,139,998	2017	
Indonesia	My Name Is Khan	US$1,720,000	2010	
Japan	RRR	JP¥2,420,000,000	2022	
Lebanon	Happy New Year	ل.ل 7,409,228,150	2014	
Malaysia	Dilwale	RM15,679,329	2015	
Nepal	Pushpa 2: The Rule	रु26,44,00,000	2024	
Pakistan	Sanju	Rs. 374,775,000	2018	
Saudi Arabia	Jawan	US$3,325,000	2023	
Singapore	Enthiran	S$2,500,000	2010	
Vietnam	Ramayana: Part 1	US$565,000	2026	
South Korea	Black	₩6,254,367,609	2009	
Sri Lanka	The Greatest of All Time	LKR 310,000,000	2024	
Taiwan	Dangal	NT$166,966,601	2017	
Thailand	Ramayana: Part 1	US$357,140	2026	
United Arab Emirates	Jawan	US$9,192,754	2023	
Cambodia	Ramayana: Part 1	US$286,000	2026	
Africa
Egypt	My Name Is Khan	E£2,911,204	2010	
Nigeria	Dhurandhar: The Revenge	₦60,994,946	2026	
South Africa	Dilwale	$466,000	2015	
Americas
Argentina	The Lunchbox	AR$1,909,640	2014	
Brazil	The Lunchbox	R$271,798	2014	
Canada	Dhurandhar: The Revenge	CA$10,140,000	2026	
Caribbean	Maine Pyar Kiya	Unknown	1989	
Colombia	The Lunchbox	COL$239,381,792	2014	
Guyana	Maine Pyar Kiya	Unknown	1989	
Mexico	The Lunchbox	Mex$1,885,972	2014	
Peru	Dilwale	S/.1,011,653	2016	
Trinidad and Tobago	Dilwale	US$258,000	2015	
United States	Dhurandhar: The Revenge	US$28,635,345	2026	
West Indies	Dilwale	Unknown	2015	
Eurasia
Russia	Delhi Safari	₽26,487,424	2012	
Soviet Union	Disco Dancer	60,000,000 руб	1984	
Turkey	Secret Superstar	₺1,902,634	2017	
Europe
Austria	The Lunchbox	€177,860	2013	
Belgium	The Lunchbox	€154,085	2013	
France	Salaam Bombay!	633,899 tickets	1988	
Germany	Monsoon Wedding	€1,813,354	2002	
Netherlands	Pathaan	€616,337	2023	
Norway	The Lunchbox	kr 1,670,000	2014	
Italy	Monsoon Wedding	US$2,207,869	2001	
Spain	Monsoon Wedding	€1,612,703	2002	
Sweden	The Lunchbox	kr 2,982,258	2014	
Switzerland	Samsara	92,995 admits	2001	
United Kingdom	Ramayana: Part 1	£4,553,812	2026	
Oceania
Australia	Dhurandhar: The Revenge	A$8,333,674	2026	
Fiji	Tiger Zinda Hai	FJ$392,502	2017	
New Zealand	Pathaan	NZ$1,373,787	2023	

=== Australia ===
Rank	Title	Gross (A$)	Year	Ref.
1	Dhurandhar: The Revenge	A$8,333,674	2026	
2	Ramayana: Part 1	A$7,112,304	2026	
3	Dhurandhar	A$5,597,797	2025	
4	Animal	A$5,022,387	2023	
5	Pathaan	A$4,720,711	2023	
6	Jawan	A$4,682,076	2023	
7	Baahubali 2: The Conclusion	A$4,500,000	2017	
8	Pushpa 2: The Rule	A$4,483,063	2024	
9	RRR	A$3,598,591	2022	
10	KGF: Chapter 2	A$3,473,771	2022	

=== China ===
Rank	Title	Gross (CN¥)	Release year		Ref.
Rank	Title	Gross (CN¥)	India	China	Ref.
1	Dangal	¥1,299,181,400	2016	2017	
2	Secret Superstar	¥747,068,700	2017	2018	
3	Andhadhun	¥325,322,100	2018	2019	
4	Bajrangi Bhaijaan	¥285,597,700	2015	2018	
5	Hindi Medium	¥210,386,400	2017	2018	
6	Hichki	¥149,574,700	2018	2018	
7	PK	¥118,182,200	2014	2015	
8	Mom	¥112,993,200	2017	2019	
9	Toilet: Ek Prem Katha	¥94,608,000	2017	2018	
10	Maharaja	¥78,348,000	2024	2024	

=== Japan ===
Rank	Title	Gross (¥)	Release year		Ref.
Rank	Title	Gross (¥)	India	Japan	Ref.
1	RRR	¥2,420,000,000	2022	2022	
2	Muthu	¥400,000,000	1995	1998	
3	Baahubali 2: The Conclusion	¥300,000,000	2017	2018	
4	Darbar	¥230,000,000	2020	2021	
5	3 Idiots	¥170,000,000	2009	2013	
6	Magadheera	¥160,000,000	2009	2018	
7	PK	¥150,000,000	2012	2014	
8	The Lunchbox	¥150,000,000	2013	2014	
9	Saaho	¥131,000,000	2019	2020	

=== Malaysia ===
Rank	Title	Gross (RM)	Year
1	Dilwale	RM15,679,329	2015
2	The Greatest of All Time	RM15,140,000	2024
3	Jailer	RM14,172,313	2023
4	Leo	RM13,207,286	2023
5	Kabali	RM12,682,409	2016
6	Bigil	RM12,679,479	2019
7	Coolie	RM12,500,000	2025
8	Ponniyin Selvan: I	RM12,500,000	2022
9	Amaran	RM12,271,207	2024
10	Mersal	RM11,830,081	2017

=== Persian Gulf ===
The Persian Gulf countries, in the context of Indian cinema box office, consist of United Arab Emirates, Saudi Arabia, Qatar, Bahrain, Oman, and Kuwait.

Rank	Title	Gross (US$)	Year	Ref.
1	Jawan	$17,700,000	2023	
2	Pathaan	$14,200,000	2023	
3	Baahubali 2: The Conclusion	$10,310,000	2017	
4	L2: Empuraan	$9,719,000	2025	
5	Bajrangi Bhaijaan	$9,450,000	2015	
6	Dangal	$8,800,000	2016	
7	Sultan	$8,570,000	2016	
8	Lokah Chapter 1: Chandra	$8,510,000	2025	
9	Dilwale	$8,410,000	2015	
10	KGF: Chapter 2	$8,150,000	2022	

=== Soviet Union ===
Rank	Title	Footfalls (est. ticket sales)	Gross (est. руб)	Release year		Ref.
Rank	Title	Footfalls (est. ticket sales)	Gross (est. руб)	India	Soviet Union	Ref.
1	Disco Dancer	120,000,000	60,000,000	1982	1984	
2	Awaara	100,000,000	37,750,000	1951	1954	
3	Mera Naam Joker	73,100,000	18,280,000	1970	1972	
4	Bobby	62,600,000	15,700,000+	1973	1975	
5	Barood	60,000,000	15,000,000+	1976	1978	
6	Sholay	60,000,000	15,000,000+	1975	1979	
7	Seeta Aur Geeta	55,200,000	13,800,000+	1972	1976	
8	Mamta	51,800,000	13,000,000	1966	1969	
9	Aradhana	47,400,000	11,850,000	1969	1972	(Note: See Aradhana (1969 film) § Box office)
10	Phool Aur Patthar	46,400,000	11,600,000	1966	1970	(Note: See Phool Aur Patthar § Box office)

=== United Kingdom ===
Rank	Title	Gross (£)	Year	Ref.	
1	Ramayana: Part 1	£4,553,812	2026		
2	Dhurandhar: The Revenge	£4,454,335	2026		
3	Pathaan	£4,381,000	2023		
4	Saiyaara	£3,220,000	2025		
5	Dhurandhar	£3,048,000	2025		
6	Jawan	£3,025,000	2023		
7	Dhoom 3	£2,710,000	2013		
8	Bajrangi Bhaijaan	£2,662,000	2015		
9	My Name Is Khan	£2,630,000	2010		
10	Dangal	£2,563,000	2016		ref

=== United States ===
Rank	Title	Gross (US$)	Year	Ref.
1	Dhurandhar: The Revenge	$28,635,345	2026	
2	Ramayana: Part 1	$26,843,872	2026	
3	Baahubali 2: The Conclusion	$20,792,334	2017	
4	Dhurandhar	$20,684,257	2025	
5	Kalki 2898 AD	$18,573,429	2024	
6	Pathaan	$17,487,476	2023	
7	Pushpa 2: The Rule	$15,280,791	2024	
8	Jawan	$15,229,123	2023	
9	RRR	$15,156,051	2022	
10	Animal	$15,000,186	2023	

== Highest-grossing films by year ==
Year	Title	Worldwide Gross	Ref
1946	Dharti Ke Lal	Unknown	
1947	Noukadubi	23,400,000 tickets	
1948	Chandralekha	¥2,319,000	
1949	Mahal	20,000,000 tickets	
1950	Samadhi	24,000,000 tickets	
1951	Awaara	200,100,000 tickets	(Note: Awaara overseas footfalls: China – 100 million; Soviet Union – 100 million; Turkey – 100,000 (opening))
1952	Aandhiyan	25,000,000 tickets	
1953	Anarkali	27,000,000 tickets	
1954	Nagin	30,000,000 tickets	
1955	Shree 420	35,000,000 tickets	
1956	Jagte Raho	33,600,000 tickets	
1957	Mother India	34,000,000 tickets	
1958	Madhumati	40,000,000 tickets	
1959	Char Dil Char Rahen	39,800,000 tickets	
1960	Love in Simla	35,000,000 tickets	
1961	Ganga Jamna	32,100,000 tickets	
1962	Bees Saal Baad	33,000,000 tickets	
1963	Taj Mahal	36,000,000 tickets	
1964	Geet Gaya Patharon Ne	38,000,000 tickets	
1965	Arzoo	40,600,000 tickets	
1966	Love In Tokyo	52,100,000 tickets	
1967	Hamraaz	42,400,000 tickets	
1968	Duniya	45,500,000 tickets	
1969	Aradhana	47,400,000 tickets	
1970	Mera Naam Joker	73,100,000 tickets	
1971	Caravan	300,000,000 tickets	
1972	Seeta Aur Geeta	55,200,000 tickets	
1973	Bobby	62,600,000 tickets	
1974	Chor Machaye Shor	25,900,000 tickets	
1975	Sholay	60,000,000 tickets	
1976	Barood	60,000,000 tickets	
1977	Dharam Veer	32,000,000 tickets	
1978	Trishul	29,700,000 tickets	
1979	Jhoota Kahin Ka	23,900,000 tickets	
1980	Adventures of Ali-Baba and the Forty Thieves	52,800,000 tickets	
1981	Kranti	70,000,000 tickets	
1982	Disco Dancer	120,000,000 tickets	
1983	Agar Tum Na Hote	24,800,000 tickets	
1984	Jagir	38,000,000 tickets	
1985	Pyar Jhukta Nahin	42,000,000 tickets	
1986	Muddat	36,000,000 tickets	
1987	Mr. India	Unknown	
1988	Salaam Bombay!	1,399,073 tickets	(Note: Salaam Bombay overseas footfalls: France – 633,899; United States – 506,100; Germany – 258,728; Switzerland and Spain – 346 (since 1996))
1989	Maine Pyar Kiya	Unknown	
1990	Aashiqui	15,000,000 tickets	
1991	Lamhe	Unknown	
1992	Raju Ban Gaya Gentleman	Unknown	
1993	Darr	$500,000	
1994	Hum Aapke Hain Koun..!	$6,168,000	(Note: Hum Aapke Hain Koun (1995 overseas release) – ₹200 million ($6,168,000) gross: United Kingdom – £1,050,000 ($1.67 million) gross – 302,000 tickets (Note: See Film industry § Average ticket price.); Other territories – $4,498,000 gross – 1,034,000 tickets)
1995	Dilwale Dulhania Le Jayenge	$6,242,965	(Note: Dilwale Dulhania Le Jayenge overseas box office: Initial run – ₹200 million ($6,168,000) gross – 1,371,000 tickets; United Kingdom – £1,580,000 ($2.18 million) gross – 454,000 tickets; Other territories – $3,988,000 gross – 917,000 tickets; Re-releases between 2006 and 2020 – $74,965 – 6,628 tickets)
1996	Khamoshi: The Musical	$750,000	
1997	Dil To Pagal Hai	$3,360,000	(Note: Dil To Pagal Hai: Initial run – $3,360,000 overseas gross; United Kingdom – £900,000 ($1.68 million) gross – 221,000 tickets; Other territories – $1,680,000 gross – 366,000 tickets; 2015 UK re-release - 108 tickets)
1998	Kuch Kuch Hota Hai	$8,000,000	(Note: Kuch Kuch Hota Hai – $8 million overseas gross: United Kingdom – $2.9 million gross – 434,174 tickets; Arabian Gulf – $400,000 gross – 49,000+ tickets; Other territories – $4.7 million gross – 1,002,000 tickets)
1999	Taal	$8,000,000	
2000	Mohabbatein	$4,250,000	(Note: Mohabbatein – $4.25 million overseas gross: United Kingdom – £1,100,000 ($1.65 million) gross – 250,000 tickets; Arabian Gulf – $375,000 gross – 46,000+ tickets; Other territories – $2,225,000 gross – 413,000 tickets)
2001	Kabhi Khushi Kabhie Gham	$8,150,000	
2002	Devdas	$6,982,000	(Note: Devdas overseas box office: Hindi version – $6.65 million gross – 1,043,408+ tickets; Europe – 508,408 tickets; United States – 474,000 tickets; Arabian Gulf – $500,000 gross – 61,000 tickets; China – CN¥2.75 million gross ($332,000) – 217,000+ tickets)
2003	Kal Ho Naa Ho	$6,100,000	
2004	Veer-Zaara	$8,220,000	
2005	Anniyan	4,480,000	
2006	Kabhi Alvida Naa Kehna	$10,770,000	(Note: Kabhi Alvida Naa Kehna – $10,770,000 overseas gross: United States – 510,000 tickets; Europe – 430,421 tickets; Arabian Gulf – $1,690,000 gross – 207,000 tickets; Australia – A$568,000 gross – 55,000 tickets)
2007	Om Shanti Om	$10,077,815	
2008	Rab Ne Bana Di Jodi	$8,500,000	
2009	3 Idiots	$30,500,000	
2010	My Name Is Khan	$23,500,000	
2011	Don 2	$11,200,000	
2012	Jab Tak Hai Jaan	$13,230,000	
2013	Dhoom 3	$35,600,000	(Note: Dhoom 3: US$35.6 million, ₹2.29 billion (equivalent to ₹4.2 billion or US$45 million in 2026))
2014	PK	$53,400,000	
2015	Bajrangi Bhaijaan	$84,000,000	
2016	Dangal	$231,000,000	
2017	Secret Superstar	$127,000,000	
2018	Padmaavat	$29,140,000	
2019	War	$13,780,000	
2020	Darbar	$11,550,000	(Note: Darbar overseas gross: Japan – ¥230 million ($2.1 million); Other territories – ₹700 million (US$9.45 million))
2021	83	$8,500,000	
2022	RRR	$47,100,000	
2023	Pathaan	$49,200,000	
2024	Pushpa 2: The Rule	$30,690,000	
2025	Dhurandhar	$32,573,000	
2026	Ramayana: Part 1	$54,247,000	

== International co-productions ==
The following films are international co-productions between Indian and non-Indian film studios. Films shot primarily in Indian languages are included on the lists above, as well as listed below. Films shot primarily in non-Indian languages are excluded from most of the lists above, but included on the list below.

Rank	Title	Overseas gross	Language(s)	Year	Ref.
1	Lincoln	$275 million	English	2013	
2	Kung Fu Yoga	$257.8 million	Mandarin	2017	
3	The Help	$216.6 million	English	2011	
4	Gandhi	$91.72 million	English	1982	(Note: Gandhi: $91,723,256, equivalent to $306,007,759 (₹15.82 billion) in 2017: North America — US$52,767,889 (₹498.9 million); United Kingdom — £22.3 million (US$38,955,367, ₹368.4 million))
5	Bride and Prejudice	$24.71 million	English	2005	
6	My Name Is Khan	$23.5 million	Hindi; English	2010	
7	Monsoon Wedding	$22.45 million	Hindi	2001	
8	Adventures of Ali-Baba and the Forty Thieves	$20.5 million	Hindustani; Russian	1980	
9	The Namesake	$18.5 million	English; Bengali	2006	
10	The Goat Life	$16.4 million	Malayalam	2024	
11	Water	$10.42 million	Hindi; English	2005	
12	Kama Sutra: A Tale of Love	$8.6 million	English	1997	
13	Salaam Mumbai	$3.9 million	Persian; Hindi; English	2016	

== See also ==
- 100 Crore Club
- 1000 Crore Club
- List of highest-grossing films in India
- List of highest-grossing Indian films
- List of most expensive Indian films
- Lists of highest-grossing films
