= 100 Crore Club =

Indian language films grossing over 1 billion rupees

The 100 Crore Club is a colloquial term used in the Indian film industry to denote films that achieve significant box office success. In Hindi cinema, it refers to films that have a net domestic box office collection of ₹100 crore (1 billion Indian rupees) or more after deducting entertainment tax. In contrast, in South Indian cinema, the term applies to films that gross ₹100 crore or more worldwide, without deductions for taxes. The key differences are that Hindi cinema tracks net earnings after tax deductions, while South Indian cinema considers gross earnings, and Hindi cinema focuses on domestic collections, whereas South Indian films account for worldwide collections.

By 2012, crossing ₹100 crore had become a benchmark for commercial success in Hindi cinema, with films reaching this milestone considered major hits. Actors Akshay Kumar (20) and Salman Khan (18) hold the most entries in the club. In 2017, the 1000 Crore Club emerged as a new benchmark for record-breaking films with Baahubali 2.

== Overview ==
The first Indian film to cross ₹100 crore worldwide was the 1982 Hindi film Disco Dancer, directed by Babbar Subhash, written by Rahi Masoom Raza, and starring Mithun Chakraborty, with over ₹90 crore grossed at the Soviet (present-day Russia) box office. (Note: Disco Dancer: India: ₹6.4 crore (US$6.54 million) (Note: 9.79 Indian rupees per US dollar in 1982) in 1982 (₹135 crore (US$14 million) in 2016); Soviet Union: US$75.9 million (Note: Disco Dancer: 60 million Soviet rubles in 1984, 0.791 rubles per US dollar in 1984) (₹94.34 crore) (Note: 12.43 Indian rupees per US dollar in 1984) in 1984 (US$235 million (₹1176 crore) in 2016)) The first Indian film to gross over ₹100 crore domestically in India was the Salman Khan and Madhuri Dixit starrer Hum Aapke Hain Kaun (1994). The next film to cross ₹100 crore worldwide was the Shah Rukh Khan and Kajol starrer Dilwale Dulhania Le Jayenge (1995).

The 100 Crore Club emerged more than a decade later, when the Aamir Khan, Asin Thottumkal and Jiah Khan starrer Ghajini (2008) was released and became the first Hindi film to earn ₹100 crore net at the box office, soon after which the term "100 Crore Club" was coined. Overseas, the first Indian film to gross ₹100 crore in international markets was the Shah Rukh Khan-Kajol-starrer My Name is Khan (2010), followed by 3 Idiots in 2011.

Beyond Hindi cinema, the first South Indian film to gross over ₹100 crore worldwide was 2007 Rajinikanth starring Tamil film Sivaji. The first Telugu film to enter the "100 Crore club" was the 2009 film by S.S. Rajamouli, Magadheera. In May 2016, Sairat become the first Marathi film to gross over ₹100 crore (US$10 million) worldwide. In 2016, Mohanlal starring Pulimurugan became the first Malayalam film to enter the club. In 2017, the first Indian English language film to enter the 100 Crore club was the Indo-British co-production Viceroy's House directed by Gurinder Chadha. It earned $12.8 million worldwide. The first Kannada movie to enter 100 Crore club was KGF: Chapter 1 directed by Prashanth Neel, released in 2018, starring Yash and Srinidhi Shetty crossing 153 crores in 11 days.

When adjusted for inflation, the first Indian film to gross an adjusted ₹100 crore was the 1940 film Zindagi, directed by P.C. Barua and written by Javed Hussain. (Note: ₹55 lakh (US$1.58 million) (Note: 3.4804 Indian rupees per US dollar in 1940: ₹13.33 per pound, $3.83 per pound) in 1940 (US$36 million or ₹181 crore in 2016)) The first Indian film to gross an adjusted ₹100 crore overseas was the 1951 film Awaara, directed by Raj Kapoor, written by Khwaja Ahmad Abbas, and starring Raj Kapoor and Nargis, becoming a blockbuster in the Soviet Union. (Note: Awaara: ₹5.75 crore (US$12.08 million) in 1954 (₹739 crore (US$110 million) in 2016): India: ₹2.3 crore (US$4.83 million) (Note: 4.7619 Indian rupees per US dollar from 1951 to 1965) in 1951 (US$60 million (₹302 crore) in 2016); Soviet Union: 29 million SUR (US$7.25 million, (Note: 4 Soviet rubles per US dollar from 1950 to 1960) ₹3.45 crore) in 1954 (US$87 million (₹437 crore) in 2016))

The first Punjabi film to cross ₹100 Crore was the Pakistani Punjabi film The Legend of Maula Jatt starring Fawad Khan and directed by Bilal Lashari in the year 2022. The first Indian Punjabi film to enter the 100 Crore club was Carry on Jatta 3 starring Gippy Grewal in the year 2023.

The latest film industry to enter the 100 Crore club was the Gujarati film industry in 2025 with the film Laalo - Krishna Sada Sahaayate grossing over ₹111 Crore worldwide.

The Hindustan Times claims that their magazine Brunch coined the term. Initially the term applied only to the lead male actor. Komal Nahta stated that "excluding women from the group is characteristic of an industry which exercises gender discrimination more than other industries." By 2013, the usage had expanded to variously include the film itself, the director, and the lead female actor. The Zee Cine Awards added a category "The Power Club Box Office" to recognise directors whose films had reached the 100 crore mark. The 100 Crore Club designation has replaced previous Bollywood indications of success which had included great music, the "Silver Jubilee" or the "Diamond Jubilee" (films that ran for 75 weeks in theatres).

However, DNA reported that "Filmmakers and distributors are known to leave no stone unturned in their attempt to cross over to the right side" of the 100 crore mark." The Times of India cancelled its "Box Office" column in November 2013 because "The stakes of filmmakers have increased so much that they are willing to go any distance to manipulate and jack up their numbers to beat each other's records." and the Times felt they were no longer able to provide accurate enough figures because "Films that have not reached the '100 crore mark but are close will insist that they have reached the '100 crore figure as they can't resist being in the '100 crore club.'"

The concentration on reaching the club has been criticised, with actor and producer Arshad Warsi stating, "I find this whole Rs.100 crore club very stupid. How can every film releasing lately do a business of Rs.100 crores all of a sudden? Instead of this, we need to concentrate on making good films." Shahid Kapoor called the designation a "fad" which was leading to "massy films which are very basic in their understanding and high on entertainment. But if we run only to achieve those figures then we will restrict ourselves as actors." On the other hand, Dibakar Banerjee, while agreeing with Kapoor about the impact on content stated, "I hope the club stays and grows to many more crores. Films as they do more business boost the confidence of audience and investors alike and everybody benefits." Priyanka Chopra said that being part of films in the 100 Crore Club allowed her to also do less commercial "women-oriented films", and lamented that as of December 2013, no woman oriented films had achieved the 100 Crore Club designation.

Variations of the "Bollywood 100 Crore Club" came into use, such as the "Bollywood 400 Crore Club" when the Shah Rukh Khan-Deepika Padukone-starrer Chennai Express reported box office receipts of 400 crore in 2013, and the "Tollywood 600 Crore Club", which relates to Telugu films that have earned over ₹600 crore (US$62 million) in 2015, such as film Baahubali: The Beginning which earned ₹650 crore (US$67 million). They were eventually succeeded by the 1000 Crore Club, when Baahubali 2: The Conclusion crossed the ₹1,000 crore mark ($104 million) in 2017.

== List of the highest-grossing 100 crore films ==
Languages with films in 100 Crore Club
	Language	Highest grossing film (release year)	Collection
1	Hindi	Dangal (2016)	₹1,968–2,200 crore
2	Telugu	Baahubali 2: The Conclusion (2017)	₹1,810.60 crore
3	Kannada	KGF: Chapter 2 (2022)	₹1200–1250 crore
4	Tamil	Jailer 2 (2026)	₹821 crore
5	English	Toxic: A Fairy Tale for Grown-Ups (2026)	₹337.80 crore
6	Malayalam	Bethlehem Kudumba Unit (2026)	₹330 crore
7	Marathi	Raja Shivaji (2026)	₹130 crore
8	Gujarati	Laalo – Krishna Sada Sahaayate (2025)	₹120 crore
9	Punjabi	Jatt & Juliet 3 (2024)	₹110 crore

== Milestones ==
See 1000 Crore Club for milestones beyond ₹1,000 crore.

=== Worldwide ===
Worldwide milestones
Nominal gross
Film	Year	Milestone	Ref
Sivaji	2007	₹100 crore	
Dasavathaaram (2008)	2008	₹200 crore	
3 Idiots (2009)	2010	₹300 crore	(Note: 3 Idiots worldwide gross: ₹453.82 crore (US$87.55 million): Domestic: ₹273.82 crore (US$57.05 million); Overseas: US$30.5 million (₹180 crore))
3 Idiots (2009)	2013	₹400 crore	(Note: 3 Idiots worldwide gross: ₹453.82 crore (US$87.55 million): Domestic: ₹273.82 crore (US$57.05 million); Overseas: US$30.5 million (₹180 crore))
Chennai Express (2013)	2013	₹400 crore	
Dhoom 3 (2013)	2013	₹500 crore	
Dhoom 3 (2013)	2014	₹550 crore	
PK (2014)	2014	₹600 crore	
PK (2014)	2015	₹700 crore	
PK (2014)	2015	₹800 crore	
Baahubali 2: The Conclusion (2017)	2017	₹900 crore	
Baahubali 2: The Conclusion (2017)	2017	₹1,000 crore	
Baahubali 2: The Conclusion (2017)	2017	₹1,100 crore	
Baahubali 2: The Conclusion (2017)	2017	₹1,200 crore	
Baahubali 2: The Conclusion (2017)	2017	₹1,300 crore	
Baahubali 2: The Conclusion (2017)	2017	₹1,400 crore	
Baahubali 2: The Conclusion (2017)	2017	₹1,500 crore	
Baahubali 2: The Conclusion (2017)	2017	₹1,600 crore	
Baahubali 2: The Conclusion (2017)	2017	₹1,700 crore	
Dangal (2016)	2017	₹1,900 crore	
Dangal (2016)	2017	₹2,000 crore	

=== Domestic ===
Domestic milestones
Nominal
Film	Year	Nett milestone	Gross milestone	Ref
Hum Aapke Hain Kaun	1994	₹50 crore	₹100 crore	
Dilwale Dulhania Le Jayenge	1995	₹60 crore	₹150 crore	
Ghajini	2008	₹100 crore	₹150 crore	
3 Idiots	2009	₹150 crore	₹200 crore	
3 Idiots	2009	₹200 crore	₹250 crore	
Chennai Express	2013	₹200 crore	₹300 crore	
Dhoom 3	2013	₹250 crore	₹350 crore	
PK	2014	₹300 crore	₹450 crore	
Baahubali: The Beginning	2015	₹400 crore	₹500 crore	
Dangal	2016	₹400 crore	₹550 crore	
Baahubali 2: The Conclusion	2017	₹500 crore	₹600 crore	
Baahubali 2: The Conclusion	2017	₹600 crore	₹700 crore	
Baahubali 2: The Conclusion	2017	₹700 crore	₹800 crore	
Baahubali 2: The Conclusion	2017	₹800 crore	₹900 crore	
Baahubali 2: The Conclusion	2017	₹900 crore	₹1,000 crore	
Baahubali 2: The Conclusion	2017	₹1,000 crore	₹1,100 crore	

=== Overseas ===
Overseas milestones
Nominal gross
Film	Year	Milestone	Ref
My Name is Khan (2010)	2010	₹100 crore	
3 Idiots (2009)	2011	₹120 crore	
3 Idiots (2009)	2013	₹150 crore	
Dhoom 3 (2013)	2014	₹200 crore	(Note: Dhoom 3 overseas gross: US$35.6 million, ₹2.172 billion (equivalent to ₹4.0 billion or US$42 million in 2026))
PK (2014)	2015	₹250 crore	
PK (2014)	2015	₹300 crore	
Dangal (2016)	2017	₹400 crore	
Dangal (2016)	2017	₹500 crore	
Dangal (2016)	2017	₹600 crore	
Dangal (2016)	2017	₹1,000 crore	
Inflation adjusted gross
Film	Year	Milestone	Ref
Awaara (1951)	1954	₹100 crore (US$10 million)	
Awaara (1951)	1954	₹200 crore (US$21 million)	
Awaara (1951)	1954	₹300 crore (US$31 million)	
Awaara (1951)	1954	₹400 crore (US$42 million)	
Char Dil Char Rahen (1959)	1962	₹500 crore (US$52 million)	(Note: Char Dil Char Rahen in Soviet Union: 9.95 million SUR (Note: 39.8 million tickets sold, average ticket price of 25 kopecks) (US$11.06 million, (Note: 0.9 Soviet rubles per US dollar from 1961 to 1971) ₹52.7 million) in 1962 (US$118 million or ₹5.91 billion in 2016))
Char Dil Char Rahen (1959)	1962	₹550 crore (US$57 million)	(Note: Char Dil Char Rahen in Soviet Union: 9.95 million SUR (Note: 39.8 million tickets sold, average ticket price of 25 kopecks) (US$11.06 million, (Note: 0.9 Soviet rubles per US dollar from 1961 to 1971) ₹52.7 million) in 1962 (US$118 million or ₹5.91 billion in 2016))
Mamta (1966)	1969	₹600 crore (US$62 million)	(Note: Mamta in Soviet Union: 13.025 million SUR (Note: 52.1 million tickets sold, average ticket price of 25 kopecks) (US$14.47 million, ₹108.5 million) (Note: 7.5 Indian rupees per US dollar from 1967 to 1970) in 1969 (US$127 million or ₹6.38 billion in 2016))
Bobby (1973)	1975	₹600 crore (US$62 million)	(Note: Bobby in Soviet Union: 15.65 million SUR (Note: 62.6 million tickets sold, average ticket price of 25 kopecks) (US$21.44 million, (Note: 0.73 Soviet rubles per US dollar in 1975) ₹192.4 million) (Note: 8.973 Indian rupees per US dollar in 1975) in 1975 (US$128 million (₹6.38 billion) in 2016))
Disco Dancer (1982)	1984	₹700 crore (US$73 million)	
Disco Dancer (1982)	1985	₹800 crore (US$83 million)	
Disco Dancer (1982)	1986	₹900 crore (US$93 million)	
Disco Dancer (1982)	1987	₹1,000 crore (US$100 million)	

== See also ==
- 1000 Crore Club
- List of highest-grossing Indian films
  - List of highest-grossing films in India
- List of highest-grossing Indian films in overseas markets
  - List of highest-grossing films in China
  - List of highest-grossing films in the Soviet Union
- List of most expensive Indian films
