= List of highest-grossing South Indian films =

South Indian cinema encompasses the five distinct film industries of Telugu, Tamil, Malayalam, Kannada and Tulu. This ranking lists the highest-grossing South Indian films produced by South cinema, based on conservative global box office estimates as reported by organizations classified as green by Wikipedia. (Note: See WP:RSP, WP:ICTFSOURCES) The figures are not adjusted for inflation. However, there is no official tracking of figures and sources publishing data are frequently pressured to increase their estimates. The industry has produced many of the most expensive films in the Indian cinema, such as, Enthiran, 2.0, RRR and Kalki 2898 AD. Baahubali 2: The Conclusion (2017), directed by S. S. Rajamouli, was the first South Indian and Indian film to gross over ₹1000 crore worldwide and remains the highest-grossing film in India to date.

== Key ==
Background shading indicates that a film is currently showing in theatres worldwide.

== Highest-grossing films ==
The following table lists the highest-grossing South Indian films worldwide.

Rank	Title	Worldwide gross	Language	Year	Ref.
1	Baahubali 2: The Conclusion	₹1,810.60 crore	Telugu	2017	(Note: Baahubali 2: The Conclusion's reported worldwide gross is 1,810.60 crore (News18 and Box Office India))
2	Pushpa 2: The Rule	₹1,642–1,800 crore	Telugu	2024	(Note: Pushpa 2's reported worldwide grosses vary between ₹1,642 crore (The Hans India) – ₹1,800 crore (Deccan Chronicle; The Indian Express).)
3	RRR	₹1,300–1,387 crore	Telugu	2022	(Note: RRR's reported worldwide grosses vary between ₹1,300 crore (News18 India, India Today, DNA) – ₹1,387 crore (NDTV India))
4	KGF: Chapter 2	₹1,200–1,250 crore	Kannada	2022	(Note: The New Indian Express and DNA India reported the worldwide collection to be around ₹1,200 crore to ₹1,216 crore, and The Hindustan Times mentioned the collection as ₹1,207 crore. News 18 and India Today mentioned that the collection was ₹1,240 crore. The Times of India, Vijaya Karnataka, TV9 Kannada and Asianet News reported that the movie grossed ₹1250 crores.)
5	Kalki 2898 AD	₹1,042–1,100 crore	Telugu	2024	(Note: Kalki 2898 AD's reported worldwide grosses vary between ₹1,042 (The Financial Express (India)) –₹1,052.5 crore (ThePrint) –₹1,100 crore (Deccan Chronicle, Business Standard, Deccan Herald, Hindustan Times and The Statesman))
6	Jailer 2	₹864.76 crore	Tamil	2026	
7	Kantara: Chapter 1	₹850–852 crore	Kannada	2025	(Note: Kantara: Chapter 1's reported worldwide grosses vary between ₹850 crore (Deccan Chronicle, Cinema Express, The New Indian Express, and DNA India) – ₹852 crore (Deccan Herald and News18))
8	2.0	₹699.89–800 crore	Tamil	2018	(Note: 2.0's reported worldwide grosses vary between ₹699.89 crore (Box Office India) – ₹723 crore (Hindustan Times) – ₹800 crore (India Today))
9	Salaar: Part 1 – Ceasefire	₹614–702 crore	Telugu	2023	(Note: According to Box Office India Salaar: Part 1 – Ceasefire grossed around ₹612 crore worldwide and Hindustan Times reported ₹617 crore while India Today reported that the film grossed around ₹700 crore worldwide during its 2023 run. In July 2024, the film was released in Japan, earning JPY 23 million (USD 142,000; ₹1.19 crore) in its initial days, bringing the adjusted worldwide total to approximately ₹614–702 crore.)
10	Jailer	₹605–650 crore	Tamil	2023	(Note: Jailer's reported worldwide grosses vary between ₹605 crore (India Today) – ₹650 crore (Firstpost))
11	Baahubali: The Beginning	₹600–650 crore	Telugu; Tamil	2015	(Note: Baahubali: The Beginning's reported worldwide grosses vary between ₹599.72 (Box Office India) – ₹600 crore (India Today and The Indian Express) – ₹650 (Firstpost))
12	Leo	₹595–615 crore	Tamil	2023	(Note: Leo's reported worldwide grosses vary between ₹595 crore (Box Office India) – ₹615 crore (Deccan Chronicle).)
13	Coolie	₹514–675 crore	Tamil	2025	(Note: Coolie's reported worldwide grosses vary between ₹514 crore (The Hans India; Filmfare; Network18 Group) – ₹515 crore (OTTPlay) – ₹675 crore (The Indian Express;))
14	Ponniyin Selvan: I	₹495.60-500 crore	Tamil	2022	(Note: Ponniyin Selvan: I's reported worldwide gross is ₹500 crore according to Hindustan Times, Outlook India, News18, and The Economic Times.)
15	The Greatest of All Time	₹440–460 crore	Tamil	2024	(Note: GOAT's reported worldwide grosses vary between ₹440 crore (Box Office India; The Hans India) – ₹452 crore (The Economic Times; NDTV) – ₹460 crore (Filmfare))
16	Saaho (Note: The film was produced in both the Telugu and Hindi languages, according to the filmmakers.)	₹434–440 crore	Telugu	2019	(Note: Saaho's reported worldwide grosses vary between ₹434 crore (Deccan Herald) – ₹439 crore (India Today))
17	Vikram	₹424–500 crore	Tamil	2022	(Note: Vikram's reported worldwide grosses vary between ₹424 crore (Deccan Herald) – ₹435 crore (Bollywood Hungama) – ₹500 crore (Hindustan Times))
18	Kantara	₹400–450 crore	Kannada	2022	(Note: Kantara's reported worldwide grosses vary between ₹400 crore (Deccan Herald, India Today, Firstpost, DNA, News18 India, The Economic Times, The Indian Express) – ₹450 crore (Hindustan Times, Outlook, The New Indian Express))
19	Adipurush	₹392.70 crore	Telugu	2023	
20	Devara: Part 1	₹380–521 crore	Telugu	2024	(Note: Devara's reported worldwide grosses vary between ₹380 crore (Box Office India) – ₹420 crore (DNA India) – ₹509 crore (Business Standard) – ₹521 crore (Bollywood Hungama))
21	Pushpa: The Rise	₹360 crore	Telugu	2021	
22	Ponniyin Selvan: II	₹345 crore	Tamil	2023	(Note: Ponniyin Selvan: II's reported worldwide grosses vary between ₹342 crore (Cinema Express) – ₹345 crore (News18) – ₹346 crore (DNA India))
23	Bethlehem Kudumba Unit	₹330.93 crore	Malayalam	2026	
24	Peddi	₹330–336.85 crore	Telugu	2026	(Note: Peddi's reported worldwide grosses vary between ₹330 crore (Deccan Herald, Cinema Express) – ₹336.85 crore (Outlook India))
25	Toxic: A Fairy Tale for Grown-ups	₹320–341.39 crore	Kannada; English	2026	
26	Amaran	₹320–335 crore	Tamil	2024	(Note: Amaran's reported worldwide grosses vary between ₹320 crore (India Today, Hindustan Times, Mint, and News18) – ₹335 crore (Moneycontrol and The Hans India))
27	Jana Nayagan	₹320–325 crore	Tamil	2026	(Note: Jana Nayagan's reported worldwide grosses vary between ₹320 crore (DNA India) – ₹320.34 crore (Deccan Chronicle) – ₹322.80 crore (The Telegraph) – ₹325 crore (News18 Malayalam))
28	Karuppu	₹310–315 crore	Tamil	2026	(Note: Karuppu's reported worldwide grosses vary between ₹310 crore (The Telegraph, Hindustan Times) – ₹315 crore (Moneycontrol))
29	Lokah Chapter 1: Chandra	₹303–305 crore	Malayalam	2025	(Note: Lokah Chapter 1: Chandra's reported worldwide gross is from ₹301.98 crore (The Telegraph) to ₹302.5 crore (ThePrint) to ₹303.2 crore (The Week) to ₹304 crore (The Hollywood Reporter))
30	Mahavatar Narsimha (Note: The film was produced multiple languages. Namely, Hindi, Kannada, Telugu and Kannada)	₹300–325 crore	Multilingual	2025	(Note: Mahavatar Narsimha's reported worldwide grosses vary between ₹300 crore (Hindustan Times, Cinema Express, News18) – ₹324.5 crore (The Economic Times) – ₹325 crore (DNA India))
31	Mana Shankara Vara Prasad Garu	₹300–310 crore	Telugu	2026	(Note: Mana Shankara Vara Prasad Garu's reported worldwide grosses vary between ₹300 crore (Filmfare, The Week) – ₹310 crore (Deccan Chronicle))
32	Hanu-Man	₹298–350 crore	Telugu	2024	(Note: HanuMan's reported worldwide grosses vary between ₹298 crore (Hindustan Times, Deccan Chronicle) – ₹350 crore (The Indian Express))
33	They Call Him OG	₹293.65–300 crore	Telugu	2025	(Note: They Call Him OG grossed ₹293.65 crore (News18; The Telegraph) – ₹294 crore (Daily News and Analysis) – ₹300 crore (The Economic Times))
34	Varisu	₹290–302 crore	Tamil	2023	(Note: The New Indian Express stated that Varisu grossed ₹290 crore worldwide. Box Office India stated that the film grossed ₹293 crore worldwide in its lifetime.)
35	Bigil	₹285–300 crore	Tamil	2019	(Note: Bigil's reported worldwide grosses vary between ₹285 crore (Firstpost) – ₹300 crore (Business Today and News18 India))
36	Kabali	₹284–305 crore	Tamil	2016	(Note: Kabali's reported worldwide grosses vary between ₹284 crore – ₹305 crore (Box Office India))
37	Enthiran	₹283–320 crore	Tamil	2010	(Note: Enthiran's reported worldwide grosses vary between ₹283 crore (Hindustan Times) – ₹290 crore (India Today) – ₹300 crore (The New Indian Express) – ₹320 crore (Box Office India))
38	L2: Empuraan	₹265–268.05 crore	Malayalam	2025	(Note: Mint reported ₹265 crore, DNA India and The Financial Express reported ₹268 crore and Asianet News reported ₹268.05 crore.)
39	Ala Vaikunthapurramuloo	₹262–280 crore	Telugu	2020	(Note: Deccan Herald reported the worldwide gross to be ₹262 crore while The New Indian Express estimated it to be ₹280 crore.)
40	Sarileru Neekevvaru	₹260 crore	Telugu	2020	
41	Sankranthiki Vasthunam	₹258–300 crore	Telugu	2025	(Note: NDTV, News18, The Hans India, The Hindu and The Economic Times have reported the ₹300 crore gross.)
42	Irumudi	₹251.25 crore	Telugu	2026	
43	KGF: Chapter 1	₹250 crore	Kannada	2018	
44	Vettaiyan	₹250 crore	Tamil	2024	(Note: Vettaiyan's reported worldwide grosses ₹250 crore (Hindustan Times))
45	Sarkar	₹243.90–253 crore	Tamil	2018	(Note: Sarkar's reported worldwide grosses vary between ₹243.90 crore (Samayam) – ₹253 crore (The Indian Express))
46	Manjummel Boys	₹242.30 crore	Malayalam	2024	
47	Drishyam 3	₹242 crore	Malayalam	2026	
48	Sye Raa Narasimha Reddy	₹240 crore	Telugu	2019	
49	Annatthe	₹240 crore	Tamil	2021	
50	Waltair Veerayya	₹236.15 crore	Telugu	2023	
51	Vaazha II: Biopic of a Billion Bros	₹234–235 crore	Malayalam	2020	
52	Thudarum	₹233–235.30 crore	Malayalam	2025	(Note: Thudarum's reported worldwide grosses vary between ₹233 crore – ₹234.5 crore (The Indian Express) – ₹235.30 crore (Asianet News))
53	I	₹227–240 crore	Tamil	2015	
54	Master	₹220–300 crore	Tamil	2021	(Note: Master's reported worldwide grosses vary between ₹220 crore (The Indian Express) – 230 crore (Box Office India) – ₹250 crore (India Today) – ₹300 crore (The News Minute))
55	Vishwaroopam	₹220 crore	Tamil	2013	
56	Petta	₹219–250 crore	Tamil	2019	(Note: Petta's reported worldwide grosses vary between ₹219 crore – ₹220 crore (Business Today) – ₹240 (Hindustan Times) – ₹250 crore Times Now))
57	Beast	₹216–300 crore	Tamil	2022	(Note: Beast's reported worldwide grosses vary between ₹216 crore (CNBC TV18) – ₹237 crore – ₹240 crore (The Indian Express) – ₹300 crore (India Today and Puthiya Thalaimurai)
58	Rangasthalam	₹216 crore	Telugu	2018	
59	Darbar	₹202–250 crore	Tamil	2020	(Note: Darbar's reported worldwide grosses vary between ₹202 crore – ₹250 crore (Hindustan Times))
60	Vishwanath & Sons	₹200–260 crore	Tamil	2026	(Note: Vishwanath & Sons's reported worldwide grosses vary between ₹200 crore (Hindustan Times, The Week) – ₹205.50 crore (DNA India) – ₹260 crore (Outlook India, Cinema Express))
61	Mersal	₹200–260 crore	Tamil	2017	
62	Good Bad Ugly	₹200–247 crore	Tamil	2025	(Note: Good Bad Ugly's reported worldwide grosses vary between ₹200 crore (Filmfare) – ₹240 crore (Deccan Chronicle – ₹248.25 crore (The Economic Times, Hindustan Times))
63	Dasavathaaram	₹200 crore	Tamil	2008	

== Highest-grossing films by language ==
=== Kannada ===
Kannada cinema is a part of Indian cinema based in Gandhi Nagar, Bengaluru. The films are made primarily in Kannada-language. The following table lists the top 10 highest-grossing Kannada films produced in the Kannada film industry.

Rank	Title	Worldwide gross	Year	Ref.
1	KGF: Chapter 2	₹1,200–1,250 crore	2022	
2	Kantara: Chapter 1	₹850–852 crore	2025	
3	Kantara	₹400–450 crore	2022	(Note: Kantara's reported worldwide grosses vary between ₹400 crore (Deccan Herald, India Today, Firstpost, DNA, News 18, The Economic Times, The Indian Express) – ₹450 crore (Hindustan Times, Outlook, The New Indian Express))
4	Toxic: A Fairy Tale for Grown-Ups	₹320–341.39 crore	2026	
(Note: There is no clear evidence of a primary language. The film's main languages are deemed to be Hindi, Kannada, Tamil and Telugu according to the Central Board of Film Certification)	Mahavatar Narsimha	₹300–325 crore	2025	(Note: Mahavatar Narsimha's reported worldwide grosses vary between ₹300 crore (Hindustan Times, Cinema Express, News18) – ₹324.5 crore (The Economic Times) – ₹325 crore (DNA India))
5	KGF: Chapter 1	₹250 crore	2018	
6	Vikrant Rona	₹159–210 crore	2022	(Note: Vikrant Rona's reported worldwide grosses vary between ₹159 crore (Hindustan Times) – ₹200 crore (DNA, India Today) – ₹210 crore (Telegraph))
7	James	₹151 crore	2022	
8	Su From So	₹125 crore	2025	
9	Premada Oorali	₹108.63 crore	2026	
10	777 Charlie	₹105–115 crore	2022	

=== Malayalam ===
Malayalam cinema, also referred to as Mollywood by certain media outlets, is a part of Indian cinema, based in Kerala and dedicated to the production of films in the Malayalam-language. The following table lists the top 10 highest-grossing Malayalam films produced in the Malayalam film industry.

Rank	Title	Worldwide gross	Year	Ref.
1	Bethlehem Kudumba Unit	₹330.93 crore	2026	
2	Lokah Chapter 1: Chandra	₹302–304 crore	2025	
3	L2: Empuraan	₹265–268.05 crore	2025	(Note: The figure published by the makers of the film (₹325 crore) is the total business done by the film, and not the total box office collection. The total box office collection varies between ₹265 crore, ₹268 crore and ₹268.05 crore as per reliable sources listed at WP:ICTFSOURCES.)
4	Manjummel Boys	₹242.30 crore	2024	
5	Drishyam 3	₹238.61–239.20 crore	2026	
6	Vaazha II: Biopic of a Billion Bros	₹234–235 crore	2026	
7	Thudarum	₹233–235.30 crore	2025	(Note: Thudarum's reported worldwide grosses vary between ₹233 crore – ₹234.5 crore (The Indian Express) – ₹235.30 crore (Asianet News))
8	2018	₹177 crore	2023	
9	The Goat Life	₹158.50 crore	2024	
10	Aavesham	₹156 crore	2024	

=== Tamil ===
Tamil cinema is a part of Indian cinema based in Chennai, Tamil Nadu. The films are made primarily in Tamil-language. The following table lists the top 10 highest-grossing Tamil films produced in the Tamil film industry.

Rank	Title	Worldwide gross	Year	Ref.
1	Jailer 2	₹826.74 crore	2026	
2	2.0	₹699.89–800 crore	2018	
3	Jailer	₹605–650 crore	2023	
4	Leo	₹595–615 crore	2023	
5	Coolie	₹514–675 crore	2025	
6	Ponniyin Selvan: I	₹500 crore	2022	
7	The Greatest of All Time	₹440–460 crore	2024	
8	Vikram	₹424–500 crore	2022	
9	Ponniyin Selvan: II	₹342–346 crore	2023	
10	Amaran	₹320–335 crore	2024	(Note: Amaran's reported worldwide grosses vary between ₹320 crore (India Today, Hindustan Times, Mint, and News18) – ₹335 crore (Moneycontrol and The Hans India))

=== Telugu ===
Telugu cinema is a part of Indian cinema producing films in the Telugu-language, in the states of Andhra Pradesh and Telangana and is centered in the Hyderabad neighbourhood of Film Nagar. The following table lists the top 10 highest-grossing Telugu films produced in the Telugu film industry.

Rank	Title	Worldwide gross	Year	Ref.
1	Baahubali 2: The Conclusion	₹1,810.43 crore	2017	
2	Pushpa 2: The Rule	₹1,800 crore	2024	
3	RRR	₹1,300–1,387 crore	2022	
4	Kalki 2898 AD	₹1,042–1,100 crore	2024	
5	Salaar: Part 1 – Ceasefire	₹614–702 crore	2023	
6	Baahubali: The Beginning	₹599.72–650 crore	2015	
7	Saaho	₹434–439 crore	2019	
8	Devara: Part 1	₹380–521 crore	2024	
9	Pushpa: The Rise	₹360 crore	2021	
10	Peddi	₹332.82 crore	2026	

== Highest-grossing films by opening day ==
Rank	Title	Worldwide gross	Language	Year	Ref.
1	Pushpa 2: The Rule	₹280–294 crore	Telugu	2024	
2	RRR	₹223 crore	Telugu	2022	
3	Baahubali 2: The Conclusion	₹217 crore	Telugu	2017	
4	Kalki 2898 AD	₹180–191 crore	Telugu	2024	(Note: Kalki 2898 AD's reported opening day grosses vary between ₹161.50 crore – ₹180 crore (Bollywood Hungama))
5	Salaar: Part 1 – Ceasefire	₹178.7 crore	Telugu	2023	
6	KGF: Chapter 2	₹165.37 crore	Kannada	2022	
7	Devara: Part 1	₹157 crore	Telugu	2024	
8	They Call Him OG	₹155 crore	Telugu	2025	
9	Coolie	₹151 crore	Tamil	2025	
10	Leo	₹148.5 crore	Tamil	2023	

== Highest-grossing films by opening weekend ==
Rank	Title	Worldwide gross	Language	Year	Ref.
1	Pushpa 2: The Rule	₹428 crore	Telugu	2024	
2	KGF: Chapter 2	₹442 crore	Kannada	2022	
3	Kalki 2898 AD	₹401 crore	Telugu	2024	
4	Baahubali 2: The Conclusion	₹400–450 crore	Telugu	2017	(Note: Kalki 2898 AD's reported opening day grosses vary between ₹161.50 crore – ₹180 crore (Bollywood Hungama))
5	RRR	₹380 crore	Telugu	2022	
6	Salaar: Part 1 – Ceasefire	₹302 crore	Telugu	2023	
7	Kantara: Chapter 1	₹268 crore	Kannada	2025	
8	Leo	₹250 crore	Tamil	2023	
9	Peddi	₹233 crore	Telugu	2026	
10	L2: Empuraan	₹175 crore	Malayalam	2025	
10	The Greatest of All Time	₹160 crore	Tamil	2024	

== Highest-grossing films by month ==
Month	Title	Worldwide gross	Language	Year	Ref.
January	Mana Shankara Vara Prasad Garu	₹300–310 crore	Telugu	2026	
February	Manjummel Boys	₹242.30 crore	Malayalam	2024	
March	RRR	₹1,300–1,387 crore	Telugu	2022	
April	Baahubali 2: The Conclusion	₹1,810.60 crore	Telugu	2017	
May	Karuppu	₹310–315 crore	Tamil	2026	
June	Kalki 2898 AD	₹1,042–1,100 crore	Telugu	2024	
July	Baahubali: The Beginning	₹599.72–650 crore	Telugu	2015	
August	Jailer	₹605–607 crore	Tamil	2023	
September	Ponniyin Selvan: I	₹500 crore	Tamil	2022	
October	Kantara: Chapter 1	₹850–852 crore	Kannada	2025	
November	2.0	₹699.89–800 crore	Tamil	2018	
December	Pushpa 2: The Rule	₹1,642–1,800 crore	Telugu	2024	

== Highest-grossing films by year ==
Year	Title	Worldwide gross	Language	Ref.
2000	Nuvve Kavali	₹20 crore distributors' share	Telugu	
2001	Kushi	₹23.4 crore distributors' share	Telugu	
2002	Indra	₹55 crore	Telugu	
2003	Tagore	₹28 crore	Telugu	
2004	Ghilli	₹50 crore	Tamil	
2005	Chandramukhi	₹75-90 crore	Tamil	(Note: Chandramukhi's reported worldwide grosses vary between ₹65 crore (The New Indian Express) – ₹74 crore (The Economic Times))
2006	Pokiri	₹70 crore	Telugu	
2007	Sivaji: The Boss	₹152 crore	Tamil	(Note: Sivaji: The Boss's reported worldwide grosses vary between ₹125 crore (The New Indian Express) – ₹148 crore (NDTV) – ₹160 crore (The Economic Times))
2008	Dasavathaaram	₹200 crore	Tamil	
2009	Magadheera	₹150 crore	Telugu	
2010	Enthiran	₹283–300 crore	Tamil	
2011	Dookudu	₹101 crore	Telugu	
2012	Thuppakki	₹130 crore	Tamil	
2013	Vishwaroopam	₹220 crore	Tamil	
2014	Lingaa	₹154 crore	Tamil	
2015	Baahubali: The Beginning	₹599.72–650 crore	Telugu	
2016	Kabali	₹284–305 crore	Tamil	
2017	Baahubali 2: The Conclusion	₹1810.60 crore	Telugu	
2018	2.0	₹699.89–800 crore	Tamil	
2019	Saaho	₹434–439 crore	Telugu	
2020	Ala Vaikunthapurramuloo	₹262–280 crore	Telugu	
2021	Pushpa: The Rise	₹360 crore	Telugu	
2022	RRR	₹1,300–1,387 crore	Telugu	
2023	Salaar: Part 1 – Ceasefire	₹614–702 crore	Telugu	
2024	Pushpa 2: The Rule	₹1,642–1,800 crore	Telugu	
2025	Kantara: Chapter 1	₹850–852 crore	Kannada	
2026	Jailer 2	₹826.74 crore	Tamil	

== See also ==
- List of highest-grossing Indian films
- List of highest-grossing films in India
- 1000 Crore Club
- 100 Crore Club
