= List of highest-grossing films in India =

This ranking lists the highest-grossing films in India, based on domestic box office estimates as reported by organizations classified as green by Wikipedia. (Note: See WP:RSP, WP:ICTFSOURCES) The figures are not adjusted for inflation. However, there is no official tracking of figures and sources publishing data are frequently pressured to increase their estimates. Box office collections have been steadily increasing in the 21st century, the main reasons attributed to the rise in ticket prices, and increase in number of theatres and prints of a film.

== Overview ==
The highest-grossing film in India is Baahubali 2: The Conclusion (2017), with a total of ₹1,429.83 crore (US$150 million).

The Indian market is dominated by domestic Indian films, which represented 90% of the country's box office revenue in 2024; this is one of the highest for a major film market apart from the United States, where domestic Hollywood films represent 88.8% of its box office revenue. While Indian films remain at the top of the domestic Indian box office, the market for Hollywood films has gradually been growing; the market share of foreign films rose from 8% in 2014 up to 15% in 2015, with Hollywood films representing 10% of the Indian market in 2016 and 13% in 2017. Some of the earliest foreign blockbusters in India included J. Lee Thompson's 1969 American Western Mackenna's Gold, and Bruce Lee's Hong Kong action cinema Enter the Dragon (in 1975) and The Way of the Dragon (in 1979). The Hollywood production Spider-Man: Brand New Day (2026) is the highest grossing foreign film in India and the 16th highest-grossing film in India with a collection of ₹602 crore (US$63 million).

== Highest-grossing films ==
The following table lists the top 50 highest-grossing films at the Indian box office.

Background shading indicates that a film is currently showing in theatres.
Background shading indicates a foreign film.

Rank (Note: Sorted based on the lowest value when figures are presented as a range, and for the same value, the older item is given a higher order.)	Title	Year	Total gross	Language(s)	Ref.
1	Baahubali 2: The Conclusion	2017	₹1,429.83 crore	Telugu	
2	Pushpa 2: The Rule	2024	₹1,403 crore	Telugu	
3	Dhurandhar: The Revenge	2026	₹1,376.51 crore	Hindi	
4	Ramayana: Part 1 *	2026	₹1,072.28 crore	Hindi	
5	Dhurandhar	2025	₹1,057.80 crore	Hindi	
6	KGF: Chapter 2	2022	₹1,008 crore	Kannada	
7	RRR	2022	₹944 crore	Telugu	
8	Kalki 2898 AD	2024	₹776 crore	Telugu	
9	Jawan	2023	₹761.98 crore	Hindi	
10	Stree 2	2024	₹740.28 crore	Hindi	
11	Kantara: Chapter 1	2025	₹738 crore	Kannada	
12	Chhaava	2025	₹708.50 crore	Hindi	
13	Animal	2023	₹662.33 crore	Hindi	
14	Pathaan	2023	₹654.28 crore	Hindi	
15	Gadar 2	2023	₹625.54 crore	Hindi	
16	Spider-Man: Brand New Day	2026	₹603 crore	English	
17	Jailer 2 *	2026	₹555 crore	Tamil	
18	2.0	2018	₹519.65 crore	Tamil	
19	Baahubali: The Beginning	2015	₹515.77 crore	Telugu / Tamil	
20	Salaar: Part 1 – Ceasefire	2023	₹512 crore	Telugu	
21	Dangal	2016	₹511.58 crore	Hindi	
22	Avatar: The Way of Water	2022	₹484.36 crore	English	
23	PK	2014	₹473.33 crore	Hindi	
24	Bajrangi Bhaijaan	2015	₹444.92 crore	Hindi	
25	Drishyam: The Conclusion *	2026	₹443.56 crore	Hindi	
26	Avengers: Endgame	2019	₹442.30 crore	English	
27	Sanju	2018	₹439.14 crore	Hindi	
28	Tiger Zinda Hai	2017	₹434.82 crore	Hindi	
29	Border 2	2026	₹424.05 crore	Hindi	
30	Sultan	2016	₹421.25 crore	Hindi	
31	Leo	2023	₹417 crore	Tamil	
32	Saiyaara	2025	₹409.18 crore	Hindi	
33	Jailer	2023	₹407 crore	Tamil	
34	Hanuman Ansh	2026	₹388.07 crore	Hindi	
35	Padmaavat	2018	₹387.31 crore	Hindi	
36	War	2019	₹378.18 crore	Hindi	
37	Dhoom 3	2013	₹364.45 crore	Hindi	
38	Kantara	2022	₹361 crore	Kannada	
39	Devara: Part 1	2024	₹347 crore	Telugu	
40	Tiger 3	2023	₹346.08 crore	Hindi	
41	Adipurush	2023	₹343 crore	Hindi / Telugu	
42	Krrish 3	2013	₹340.17 crore	Hindi	
43	Coolie	2025	₹337.50 crore	Tamil	
44	Saaho	2019	₹339.25 crore	Telugu / Hindi	
45	Bhool Bhulaiyaa 3	2024	₹334.67 crore	Hindi	
46	Tanhaji	2020	₹332.80 crore	Hindi	
47	Kabir Singh	2019	₹331.24 crore	Hindi	
48	Ponniyin Selvan: I	2022	₹327.45 crore	Tamil	(Note: Ponniyin Selvan: I's reported worldwide grosses vary between ₹450 crore (Zee News) – ₹480 crore (Pinkvilla) – ₹500 crore (Hindustan Times))
49	Pushpa: The Rise	2021	₹325.45 crore	Telugu	
50	Kick	2014	₹322.01 crore	Hindi	

== Films with highest footfalls ==
This is a list of films ranked by ticket sales in India, including all language versions.

There is no exact data prior to 1993, but estimates for films before this period have been compiled using various sources.

Rank	Title	Year	Ticket sales (est.)	Language(s)	Ref.
1	Sholay	1975	150,000,000–180,000,000	Hindi	
2	Mother India	1957	100,000,000	Hindi	
2	Mughal-e-Azam	1960	100,000,000	Hindustani	
2	Baahubali 2: The Conclusion	2017	100,000,000	Telugu	
5	Maine Pyar Kiya	1989	79,700,000	Hindi	
6	Hum Aapke Hain Koun..!	1994	73,962,000	Hindi	
7	Coolie	1983	70,000,000	Hindi	
8	Pushpa 2: The Rule	2024	55,000,000	Telugu	
9	Ganga Jamna	1961	52,500,000	Hindi	
9	Muqaddar Ka Sikandar	1978	52,500,000	Hindi	
11	Gadar: Ek Prem Katha	2001	50,573,000	Hindi	
12	KGF: Chapter 2	2022	50,500,000	Kannada	
13	Sangam	1964	50,000,000	Hindi	
13	Amar Akbar Anthony	1977	50,000,000	Hindustani	
13	Kranti	1981	50,000,000	Hindi	
16	Baahubali: The Beginning	2015	49,000,000	Telugu / Tamil	
17	Dilwale Dulhania Le Jayenge	1995	47,971,000	Hindi	
18	Dharam Veer	1977	47,500,000	Hindi	
19	RRR	2022	44,000,000	Telugu	
20	Bobby	1973	42,500,000	Hindi	
20	2.0	2018	42,500,000	Tamil	
22	Raja Hindustani	1996	40,097,500	Hindi	
23	Shree 420	1955	40,000,000	Hindi	
23	Naya Daur	1957	40,000,000	Hindi	
23	Mere Mehboob	1963	40,000,000	Hindustani	
23	Jai Santoshi Maa	1975	40,000,000	Hindi	
23	Vidhaata	1982	40,000,000	Hindi	
23	Ram Teri Ganga Maili	1985	40,000,000	Hindi	
23	Dhurandhar: The Revenge	2026	40,000,000	Hindi	
30	Kismet	1943	37,500,000	Hindustani	
30	Upkar	1967	37,500,000	Hindi	
30	Roti Kapada Aur Makaan	1974	37,500,000	Hindi	
30	Naseeb	1981	37,500,000	Hindi	
34	Border	1997	37,083,000	Hindi	
35	Dangal	2016	36,996,000	Hindi	
36	Rattan	1944	36,000,000	Hindustani	
37	Kuch Kuch Hota Hai	1998	35,658,000	Hindi	
38	Bajrangi Bhaijaan	2015	35,417,000	Hindi	
39	PK	2014	35,061,000	Hindi	
40	Dhurandhar	2025	35,500,000	Hindi	
41	Waqt	1965	35,000,000	Hindi	
41	Aradhana	1969	35,000,000	Hindi	
41	Johny Mera Naam	1970	35,000,000	Hindi	
41	Trishul	1978	35,000,000	Hindi	
41	Beta	1992	35,000,000	Hindi	
41	Jawan	2023	35,000,000	Hindi	
47	Gadar 2	2023	34,000,000	Hindi	
48	Seeta Aur Geeta	1972	33,800,000	Hindi	
49	Laila Majnu	1976	32,700,000	Hindustani	
50	Anmol Ghadi	1946	32,500,000	Hindustani	
50	Madhumati	1958	32,500,000	Hindi	
50	Aankhen	1968	32,500,000	Hindi	
50	Sanyasi	1975	32,500,000	Hindi	
50	Qurbani	1980	32,500,000	Hindi	
50	Meri Aawaz Suno	1981	32,500,000	Hindi	

== Highest-grossing milestone films ==
Year	Film	Gross milestone	Primary language	Ref.
1940	Punar Milan	₹30 lakh	Hindustani	
1940	Achhut	₹40 lakh	Hindustani	
1940	Zindagi	₹50 lakh	Hindustani	
1941	Khazanchi	₹60 lakh	Hindustani	
1941	Khazanchi	₹70 lakh	Hindustani	
1942	Basant	₹80 lakh	Hindustani	
1943	Kismet	₹90 lakh	Hindustani	
1943	Kismet	₹1 crore	Hindustani	
1949	Barsaat	₹2 crore	Hindi	
1955	Shree 420	₹3 crore	Hindi	
1957	Naya Daur	₹4 crore	Hindi	
1957	Naya Daur	₹5 crore	Hindi	
1957	Mother India	₹6 crore	Hindi	
1957	Mother India	₹7 crore	Hindi	
1957	Mother India	₹8 crore	Hindi	
1960	Mughal-e-Azam	₹9 crore	Hindustani	
1960	Mughal-e-Azam	₹10 crore	Hindustani	
1975	Sholay	₹20 crore	Hindi	
1975	Sholay	₹30 crore	Hindi	
1994	Hum Aapke Hain Koun..!	₹40 crore	Hindi	
1994	Hum Aapke Hain Koun..!	₹50 crore	Hindi	
1994	Hum Aapke Hain Koun..!	₹60 crore	Hindi	
1994	Hum Aapke Hain Koun..!	₹70 crore	Hindi	
1994	Hum Aapke Hain Koun..!	₹80 crore	Hindi	
1994	Hum Aapke Hain Koun..!	₹90 crore	Hindi	
1994	Hum Aapke Hain Koun..!	₹100 crore	Hindi	
2009	3 Idiots	₹200 crore	Hindi	
2013	Chennai Express	₹300 crore	Hindi	
2014	PK	₹400 crore	Hindi	
2015	Baahubali: The Beginning	₹500 crore	Telugu	
2017	Baahubali 2: The Conclusion	₹600 crore	Telugu	
2017	Baahubali 2: The Conclusion	₹700 crore	Telugu	
2017	Baahubali 2: The Conclusion	₹800 crore	Telugu	
2017	Baahubali 2: The Conclusion	₹900 crore	Telugu	
2017	Baahubali 2: The Conclusion	₹1,000 crore	Telugu	
2017	Baahubali 2: The Conclusion	₹1,100 crore	Telugu	
2017	Baahubali 2: The Conclusion	₹1,200 crore	Telugu	
2017	Baahubali 2: The Conclusion	₹1,300 crore	Telugu	
2017	Baahubali 2: The Conclusion	₹1,400 crore	Telugu	

== Highest-grossing films by market ==
Market	Title	Year	Gross	Ref.
Andhra Pradesh / Telangana	RRR	2022	₹396 crore	
Assam	Roi Roi Binale	2025	₹38 crore	
Gujarat	Pushpa 2: The Rule	2024	₹100 crores	
Karnataka	Kantara: Chapter 1	2025	₹235 crores	
Kerala	Bethlehem Kudumba Unit	2026	₹154 crore	
Maharashtra	Dhurandhar: The Revenge	2026	₹343.94 crore	
Odisha	Pushpa 2: The Rule	2024	₹22 crores	
Tamil Nadu	Leo	2023	₹231 crores	

== Biggest opening weekends ==
Rank	Title	Year	Total domestic gross	Primary language	Number of days	Ref.
1	Pushpa 2: The Rule	2024	₹632 crore	Telugu	4	
2	Dhurandhar: The Revenge	2026	₹550 crore	Hindi	4	
3	KGF: Chapter 2	2022	₹442 crore	Kannada	4	
4	Kalki 2898 AD	2024	₹401 crore	Telugu	4	
5	Baahubali 2 : The Conclusion	2017	₹391 crore	Telugu	3	
6	RRR	2022	₹380 crore	Telugu	3	
7	Jawan	2023	₹342 crore	Hindi	4	
8	Pathaan	2023	₹335 crore	Hindi	5	
9	Spider-Man: Brand New Day	2026	₹306 crore	English	4	
10	Salaar: Part 1 – Ceasefire	2023	₹302 crore	Telugu	3	

== See also ==
- List of highest-grossing Indian films
  - List of highest-grossing Indian Bengali films
  - List of highest-grossing Hindi films
  - List of highest-grossing Kannada films
  - List of highest-grossing Malayalam films
  - List of highest-grossing Marathi films
  - List of highest-grossing Punjabi films
  - List of highest-grossing Tamil films
  - List of highest-grossing Telugu films
- List of highest-grossing Indian films in overseas markets
- 100 Crore Club
- 1000 Crore Club
