= 1000 Crore Club =

Indian films grossing over 10 billion rupees

1000 Crore Club is an unofficial designation by the Indian film trade and media, related to Indian language films that have grossed ₹1000 crore (10 billion Indian rupees or more either domestically within India or worldwide. It is preceded by the 100 Crore Club. In 2017, Baahubali 2: The Conclusion became the first Indian film to gross over ₹1,000 crore worldwide. It grossed ₹1,430 crore across all languages in India and grossed ₹1,810 crore worldwide. It stands as the highest-grossing film in India till date.

Baahubali 2 was followed by Dangal, which is the highest-grossing Indian film globally till date, which grossed over ₹2,000 crore. In 2022, two films released in the span of a month, RRR (Note: NDTV India, News18, India Today, DNA) and KGF: Chapter 2, grossed over ₹1,000 crore at the global box office. The club expanded with films like Pathaan (2023), Jawan (2023), Kalki 2898 AD (2024), and Pushpa 2: The Rule (2024), with the latter being the fastest to achieve the record (in 6 days). The Dhurandhar has been the only franchise of which two films crossed ₹1000 crore; Dhurandhar (2025) and Dhurandhar: The Revenge (2026). Ramayana: Part 1 (2026) achieved the feat in 8 days of its release.

S.S. Rajamouli (Baahubali 2: The Conclusion and RRR), Aditya Dhar (Dhurandhar and Dhurandhar: The Revenge) and Nitesh Tiwari (Dangal and Ramayana: Part 1) are the only directors to have delivered two ₹1,000 crore worldwide gross films. Prabhas (Baahubali 2: The Conclusion and Kalki 2898 AD), Shah Rukh Khan (Jawan and Pathaan), Ranveer Singh (Dhurandhar and Dhurandhar: The Revenge) and Yash (KGF: Chapter 2 and Ramayana: Part 1) are the actors who played lead roles in two ₹1,000 crore films. Deepika Padukone is the only actress to have featured in three ₹1,000 crore films (Jawan, Pathaan and Kalki 2898 AD).

== History ==
Baahubali 2: The Conclusion, released on 28 April 2017, became the first Indian film to cross the ₹1,000 crore (US$153.56 million) mark in May 2017, and briefly became the highest-grossing Indian film worldwide, before being overtaken by Dangal with the help of Chinese release.

Baahubali 2 is the highest-grossing film in India till date, where it has grossed ₹1,429 crore. The film became the highest grossing film in 28 out of the 29 Indian states at the time of its release, a feat achieved by no other film since. Overseas, it was the highest-grossing Indian film of its time in the United States ($21 million), where it became the first Indian film to cross $20 million, as well as becoming the first Indian film to gross over $10 million in the United Arab Emirates.

Dangal (2016), following its Chinese release on 5 May 2017, became the highest-grossing Indian film of all time and fifth highest-grossing non-English language film of that time, crossing ₹2,000 crore worldwide.

Dhurandhar: The Revenge (2026) became the first Indian film to cross ₹1,000 crore net in a single language (Hindi); netting over ₹1,100 crore in all languages; in addition, it became the highest-grossing Indian film in the United States, United Kingdom, Australia and Canada.

== List ==
This is a list of Indian films that have grossed ₹1,000 crore or more worldwide, domestically, or in overseas markets, without adjustment for inflation. Box-office figures are estimates and may vary between sources.

Background shading indicates films playing in the week commencing 20 November 2026 in theaters around the world.

=== Worldwide ===
No.	Title	Worldwide gross	Worldwide gross	Year	Language	Ref
1	Dangal	₹2,024 crore	2016	Hindi		
2	Dhurandhar: The Revenge	₹1,850.42 crore	2026	Hindi		
3	Baahubali 2: The Conclusion	₹1,810.60 crore	2017	Telugu		
4	Pushpa 2: The Rule	₹1,742.10 crore	2024	Telugu		
5	Ramayana: Part 1	₹1,651.00 crore	2026	Hindi		
6	RRR	₹1,387 crore	2022	Telugu		
7	Dhurandhar	₹1,350.83 crore	2025	Hindi		
8	KGF: Chapter 2	₹1,250 crore	2022	Kannada		
9	Jawan	₹1,148.32 crore	2023	Hindi		
10	Pathaan	₹1,050.30 crore	2023	Hindi		
11	Kalki 2898 AD	₹1,042.25 crore	2024	Telugu		

=== Domestic ===
No.	Title	Domestic gross	Year	Language	Ref
1	Baahubali 2: The Conclusion	₹1,429.83 crore	2017	Telugu	
2	Pushpa 2: The Rule	₹1,403 crore	2024	Telugu	
3	Dhurandhar: The Revenge	₹1,374.39 crore	2026	Hindi	
4	Ramayana: Part 1	₹1,083.70 crore	2026	Hindi	
5	Dhurandhar	₹1,007.85 crore	2025	Hindi	
6	KGF: Chapter 2	₹1,000.85 crore	2022	Kannada	

=== Overseas ===
No.	Title	Overseas gross	Year	Language	Ref
1	Dangal	₹1,535.30 crore	2016	Hindi	

=== Worldwide ===
Title	Release	Milestone	Date	Ref
Baahubali 2: The Conclusion	2017	₹1,000 crore	8 May 2017	
Baahubali 2: The Conclusion	2017	₹1,300 crore	15 May 2017	
Baahubali 2: The Conclusion	2017	₹1,500 crore	19 May 2017	
Dangal	2016	₹1,600 crore	29 May 2017	
Dangal	2016	₹1,700 crore	31 May 2017	
Dangal	2016	₹1,800 crore	2 June 2017	
Dangal	2016	₹1,900 crore	7 June 2017	
Dangal	2016	₹2,000 crore	26 June 2017	

=== Domestic ===
Title	Release	Milestone	Date	Ref
Baahubali 2: The Conclusion	2017	₹1,000 crore (gross)	15 May 2017	
Baahubali 2: The Conclusion	2017	₹1,100 crore (gross)	17 May 2017	
Baahubali 2: The Conclusion	2017	₹1,200 crore (gross)	19 May 2017	
Baahubali 2: The Conclusion	2017	₹1,000 crore (nett)	25 May 2017	
Baahubali 2: The Conclusion	2017	₹1,300 crore (gross)	5 June 2017	
Baahubali 2: The Conclusion	2017	₹1,100 crore (nett)	September 2017	
Baahubali 2: The Conclusion	2017	₹1,400 crore(gross)	September 2017	

=== Overseas ===
Title	Release	Milestone	Date	Ref
Dangal	2016	₹1,000 crore	25 May 2017	
Dangal	2016	₹1,100 crore	28 May 2017	
Dangal	2016	₹1,200 crore	1 June 2017	
Dangal	2016	₹1,300 crore	5 June 2017	
Dangal	2016	₹1,400 crore	12 June 2017	
Dangal	2016	₹1,500 crore	November 2017	(Note: Dangal worldwide gross: ₹2,112.33 crore (US$324.37 million): India — ₹512 crore (US$76.2 million); Overseas — ₹1,525.33 crore (US$234.23 million); Chinese markets — ₹1,318.1 crore (US$202.41 million); China — ₹1,254 crore (US$192.56 million); Taiwan — ₹41 crore (US$6.3 million); Hong Kong — ₹ 23.1 crore (US$3.5 million); Other territories — ₹ 207.23 crore (US$30.7 million))

== See also ==
- List of highest-grossing Indian films
- List of highest-grossing films in India
- List of highest-grossing Indian films in overseas markets
- List of most expensive Indian films
