= List of Indian films of 2017 =

Indian Films
- Previous: List of Indian films of 2016; Next: List of Indian films of 2018

This is the list of Indian films that are released in 2017.

== Box office collection ==
The list of highest-grossing Indian films released in 2017, by worldwide box office gross revenue in crore, are as follows:

#+	Implies that the film is multilingual and the gross collection figure includes the worldwide collection of the other simultaneously filmed version.

Rank	Film	Studio(s)	Primary language	Worldwide gross	Ref.
1	Baahubali 2: The Conclusion	Arka Media Works	Telugu	₹1,810.60 crore	
2	Secret Superstar	Zee Studios	Hindi	₹858 crore (equivalent to ₹13 billion or US$140 million in 2026)	
3	Tiger Zinda Hai	Yash Raj Films	Hindi	₹565.1 crore (equivalent to ₹865 crore or US$90 million in 2026)	
4	Hindi Medium	Maddock Films; T-Series	Hindi	₹322.4 crore (equivalent to ₹494 crore or US$51 million in 2026)	
5	Toilet: Ek Prem Katha	Viacom 18 Motion Pictures; KriArj Entertainment; Plan C Studios; Cape of Good Films	Hindi	₹311.5 crore (equivalent to ₹477 crore or US$50 million in 2026)	
6	Golmaal Again	Rohit Shetty Pictures; Mangal Murti Films; Reliance Entertainment	Hindi	₹311 crore (equivalent to ₹476 crore or US$49 million in 2026)	
7	Raees	Red Chillies Entertainment; Excel Entertainment	Hindi	₹308 crore (equivalent to ₹471 crore or US$49 million in 2026)	
8	Mersal	Thenandal Studio Limited	Tamil	₹200 crore (equivalent to ₹306 crore or US$32 million in 2026)—₹260 crore (equivalent to ₹398 crore or US$41 million in 2026)	
9	Judwaa 2	Nadiadwala Grandson Entertainment	Hindi	₹227.59 crore (equivalent to ₹348 crore or US$36 million in 2026)–₹250 crore (equivalent to ₹383 crore or US$40 million in 2026)	
10	Tubelight	Salman Khan Films; Kabir Khan Films	Hindi	₹211.14 crore (equivalent to ₹323 crore or US$34 million in 2026)	

== Lists of Indian films of 2017 ==
- List of Assamese films of 2017
- List of Indian Bengali films of 2017
- List of Gujarati films of 2017
- List of Hindi films of 2017
- List of Kannada films of 2017
- List of Malayalam films of 2017
- List of Marathi films of 2017
- List of Odia films of 2017
- List of Punjabi films of 2017
- List of Tamil films of 2017
- List of Telugu films of 2017
- List of Tulu films of 2017

== See also ==
- List of Indian films of 2016
- List of Indian films of 2018
- List of Indian films of 2019
- List of Indian films of 2020
- List of Indian films of 2021
- List of Indian films of 2022
- List of Indian films of 2023
- List of Indian films of 2024
- List of Indian films of 2025

Preceded by 2016	Indian films 2017	Succeeded by 2018
