= List of Indian films of 2018 =

Indian Films
- Previous: List of Indian films of 2017; Next: List of Indian films of 2019

This is the list of Indian films that are released in 2018

== Box office collection ==
The list of highest-grossing Indian films released in 2018, by worldwide box office gross revenue, are as follows:

Highest worldwide gross of 2018
Rank	Title	Production company	Language	Worldwide gross	Ref.
1	2.0	Lyca Productions	Tamil	₹699.89 crore (equivalent to ₹10 billion or US$110 million in 2026)–₹800 crore (equivalent to ₹12 billion or US$120 million in 2026)	
2	Sanju	Vinod Chopra Films; Rajkumar Hirani Films	Hindi	₹586.85 crore (equivalent to ₹857 crore or US$89 million in 2026)–₹588 crore (equivalent to ₹858 crore or US$89 million in 2026)	
3	Padmaavat	Viacom 18 Motion Pictures; Bhansali Productions	Hindi	₹571.98 crore (equivalent to ₹835 crore or US$87 million in 2026)–₹585 crore (equivalent to ₹854 crore or US$89 million in 2026)	
4	Andhadhun	Viacom 18 Motion Pictures; Matchbox Pictures	Hindi	₹456.89 crore (equivalent to ₹667 crore or US$69 million in 2026)	
5	Simmba	Dharma Productions; Rohit Shetty Picturez	Hindi	₹391.68 crore (equivalent to ₹572 crore or US$59 million in 2026)	
6	Thugs of Hindustan	Yash Raj Films	Hindi	₹335 crore (equivalent to ₹489 crore or US$51 million in 2026)	
7	Race 3	Salman Khan Films; Tips Films	Hindi	₹303 crore (equivalent to ₹442 crore or US$46 million in 2026)	
8	Sarkar	Sun Pictures	Tamil	₹260 crore (equivalent to ₹380 crore or US$39 million in 2026)	
9	Baaghi 2	Nadiadwala Grandson Entertainment	Hindi	₹254.33 crore (equivalent to ₹371 crore or US$39 million in 2026)	
10	K.G.F: Chapter 1	Hombale Films	Kannada	₹250 crore (equivalent to ₹365 crore or US$38 million in 2026)	

== Lists of Indian films of 2018 ==
- List of Assamese films of 2018
- List of Bengali films of 2018
- List of Bollywood films of 2018
- List of Gujarati films of 2018
- List of Kannada films of 2018
- List of Malayalam films of 2018
- List of Marathi films of 2018
- List of Odia films of 2018
- List of Punjabi films of 2018
- List of Tamil films of 2018
- List of Telugu films of 2018
- List of Tulu films of 2018

Preceded by 2017	Indian films 2018	Succeeded by 2019
