= Baahubali 2: The Conclusion =

2017 Indian film by S. S. Rajamouli

- Theatrical release poster
- Directed by: S. S. Rajamouli
- Screenplay by: S. S. Rajamouli
- Story by: V. Vijayendra Prasad
- Dialogues by: C. H. Vijay Kumar
- Produced by: Shobu Yarlagadda; Prasad Devineni
- Starring: Prabhas; Rana Daggubati; Anushka Shetty; Tamannaah Bhatia; Ramya Krishna; Sathyaraj; Nassar; Subbaraju
- Cinematography: K. K. Senthil Kumar
- Edited by: Kotagiri Venkateswara Rao; Tammiraju
- Music by: M. M. Keeravani
- Production company: Arka Media Works
- Distributed by: see below
- Release date: 28 April 2017
- Running time: 171 minutes
- Country: India
- Language: Telugu
- Budget: ₹250 crore
- Box office: est. ₹1,810.60 crore

Baahubali 2: The Conclusion (Note: Styled in official material as bāhubaLi; transl. 'The One with Strong Arms') is a 2017 Indian Telugu-language epic action drama film directed by S. S. Rajamouli, who co-wrote the script with V. Vijayendra Prasad. It was produced by Shobu Yarlagadda and Prasad Devineni under the banner Arka Media Works. The cast includes Prabhas in a dual and titular role, alongside Rana Daggubati, Anushka Shetty, Tamannaah Bhatia, Ramya Krishna, Sathyaraj, Nassar and Subbaraju. It is the sequel to Baahubali: The Beginning, as well as the final installment in the Baahubali film duology. The film is set in fictional ancient India and centers on the rivalry between siblings Amarendra Baahubali and Bhallaladeva. Bhallaladeva conspires against Amarendra, leading to his death at the hands of Kattappa. Years later, Amarendra's son (Mahendra or Sivudu) seeks to avenge his father's demise. The film was primarily shot in Telugu, with a limited number of close-up scenes also filmed in Tamil for select actors.

The film was produced on an estimated budget of ₹250 crore, making it the most expensive Indian film at the time of its release. Production began on 17 December 2015 at Ramoji Film City in Hyderabad. The cinematography was handled by K. K. Senthil Kumar, with editing by Kotagiri Venkateswara Rao, and Tammiraju. The production design was created by Sabu Cyril, while the action sequences were choreographed by King Solomon, Lee Whittaker, and Kecha Khamphakdee. Visual effects were designed by Makuta VFX, with contributions from Adel Adili and Pete Draper. The music and background score were composed by M. M. Keeravani. The film was released on 28 April 2017 in Telugu, Tamil, Hindi, Kannada and Malayalam, and later dubbed in Japanese, Russian and Chinese. It was available in conventional 2D and IMAX formats and was the first Telugu film to release in 4K High Definition format.

Baahubali 2 was one of the most anticipated films of 2017, primarily due to the massive cliffhanger ending of its predecessor. The film premiered on over 9,000 screens worldwide, with 6,500 screens in India, setting a record for the widest release of an Indian film. Upon its release, Baahubali 2 like its predecessor, received widespread acclaim for its direction, storytelling, cinematography, themes, visual effects, music, action sequences, and performances. The film grossed over ₹1810.60 crore worldwide, briefly becoming the highest grossing Indian film of all time, surpassing PK (2014). It collected approximately ₹792 crore worldwide within the first six days and became the first Indian film to gross over ₹1,000 crore. Within India, it set numerous records, becoming the highest-grossing film in Hindi, as well as in its original Telugu language. As of 2025, Baahubali 2 remains the highest-grossing film in India. It is currently the highest grossing Telugu film, the highest grossing South Indian film, and the third highest-grossing Indian film worldwide. The film sold over 10 crore tickets during its box office run, marking the highest estimated admissions for any film in India since Sholay (1975). It also ranks among the top 50 highest-grossing non-English films globally.

Baahubali 2, along with its predecessor, is regarded as one of the most influential films in Indian cinema. It set new standards in large-scale filmmaking with its high budget, expansive action sequences, and franchise-building approach. The film won the Saturn Award for Best International Film and three National Film Awards, including Best Popular Film Providing Wholesome Entertainment, Best Special Effects, and Best Stunt Choreographer. It also fetched the state Gaddar Award for Best Feature Film. The Baahubali franchise also pioneered the pan-Indian film movement of dubbing the same film in multiple languages instead of remaking it. A combined recut version of The Beginning and The Conclusion, titled Baahubali: The Epic, was theatrically released worldwide on 31 October 2025.

== Plot ==
Kattappa continues his narration of the events leading to Amarendra Baahubali's assassination.

Following the victory over the Kalakeyas, Rajmata Sivagami proclaims Amarendra the heir apparent to the throne of Mahishmati, while appointing her biological son, Bhallaladeva, as the kingdom's commander-in-chief. Before his coronation, Sivagami commands Amarendra to tour the kingdom incognito alongside Kattappa to understand the condition of the populace. During their travels, Amarendra witnesses Princess Devasena of the neighboring Kuntala kingdom single-handedly repelling a bandit raid. Smitten by her martial prowess and grace, Amarendra assumes the guise of a simpleton to gain employment at the Kuntala royal palace as a security guard, while Kattappa poses as his uncle.

Back in Mahishmati, Bhallaladeva encounters a portrait of Devasena and, coveting her beauty, maliciously requests her hand in marriage from Sivagami. Unaware of Amarendra's romantic entanglement, Sivagami sends an opulent marriage proposal to Kuntala, which includes a condescending demand of submission. Devasena fiercely rejects the proposal. Enraged by her defiance, Sivagami is manipulated by Bhallaladeva's disabled father, Bijjaladeva, into issuing a royal decree commanding Amarendra to arrest Devasena and bring her to Mahishmati as a captive. Concurrently, the Kuntala palace is ambushed by a massive raiding army of Pindari warriors. Dropping his charade, Amarendra coordinates a brilliant defense alongside Devasena and her cousin, Kumara Varma, utilizing synchronized archery to slaughter the invaders. Kattappa subsequently reveals Amarendra's true identity as the Crown Prince of Mahishmati. Amarendra promises to protect Devasena's honor and autonomy, and she agrees to accompany him to the capital as his prospective bride.

Upon their arrival in Mahishmati, the mutual misunderstanding is exposed. When Sivagami delivers a severe ultimatum forcing Amarendra to choose between his succession to the throne or his marriage to Devasena, Amarendra chooses Devasena. Consequently, Bhallaladeva is crowned Emperor, while Amarendra is stripped of his birthright and designated as the new commander-in-chief. Even without the crown, Amarendra retains the absolute adoration and loyalty of the populace.

When Devasena is pregnant, a deeply threatened Bhallaladeva strips Amarendra of his military rank and appoints a corrupt loyalist, Sethupathi, in his place. Devasena openly opposes the decision, arguing that Amarendra should reclaim his rightful throne. Later, inside a temple, Sethupathi attempts to molest Devasena, prompting her to sever his fingers. Brought before the royal court, Devasena denounces Sivagami's silent complicity with Bhallaladeva's unjust laws. Prompted by his wife's legal defense, Amarendra decapitates Sethupathi on the spot. This act of insubordination results in the immediate exile of Amarendra and Devasena from the royal palace.

Despite their displacement, the couple lives happily among the common citizens, who continue to revere Amarendra as their true king. Threatened by his cousin's unyielding popularity, Bhallaladeva conspires with Bijjaladeva to orchestrate a definitive coup. Bijjaladeva manipulates a naive Kumara Varma into believing that Bhallaladeva intends to assassinate Amarendra's family. Kumara Varma infiltrates the royal chambers at night but falls into a trap; Bhallaladeva massacres his own guards, and Bijjaladeva executes Kumara Varma after self-inflicting facial wounds on Bhallaladeva to frame the incident as an assassination attempt ordered by Amarendra. Convinced that her foster son has turned traitor, an enraged Sivagami orders his execution. To prevent a massive civil war among the loyalist legions, she commands Kattappa to carry out the assassination covertly. Bound by his ancestral oath of absolute servitude, a heartbroken Kattappa lures a battle-worn Amarendra into a secluded sanctuary and stabs him from behind. As he bleeds out, a forgiving Amarendra asks Kattappa to protect Sivagami, proclaiming "Jai Mahishmati" before passing away.

Bhallaladeva arrives at the scene and gleefully exposes his elaborate treachery to Kattappa. Horrified, Kattappa rushes back to inform Sivagami of her catastrophic error. When Devasena arrives at the palace gates carrying her newborn infant, a guilt-ridden Sivagami publicly exposes Bhallaladeva's crimes to the panicked masses, proclaiming the newborn Mahendra Baahubali as the rightful Emperor of Mahishmati. As Bhallaladeva turns the palace guards against her to seize the child, Sivagami flees toward the river underneath the waterfall, concluding the historical flashback. Bhallaladeva rules for the next twenty-five years as a tyrannical king, keeping Devasena imprisoned in an outdoor cage where she methodically gathers twigs to build a future funeral pyre for him.

In the present, Mahendra Baahubali, deeply moved by his father's tragic demise, declares war against the tyrant. Backed by the Amburi tribesmen, the subterranean rebel alliance, and a defecting slave army led by Kattappa, Mahendra launches a calculated siege on the capital. During the assault, Bhallaladeva kills Kuntala's remaining ruler, Jaya Varma, and forcefully takes Devasena with him. Mahendra and Kattappa breach the heavily fortified walls using innovative palm-tree catapult tactics. Mahendra intercepts Bhallaladeva, engaging him in a brutal, earth-shattering brawl. Mahendra ultimately overpowers Bhallaladeva, chaining him to the wooden funeral pyre that Devasena had systematically gathered over 25 years. Despite Bhallaladeva's desperate pleas, Devasena ignites the pyre, burning him alive. Mahendra Baahubali is officially crowned the supreme Emperor of Mahishmati with Avantika as his queen, vowing to restore peace and equity to the realm. The film concludes as Mahendra recites Sivagami's iconic creed, declaring his word to be the absolute law, while the massive, severed golden head of Bhallaladeva's statue is swept away by the river.

== Cast ==
- Prabhas in a dual role as
  - Amarendra Baahubali
  - Mahendra Baahubali "Sivudu", Amarendra's son
- Rana Daggubati as Bhallaladeva
- Anushka Shetty as Devasena (Voiced by Sowmya Sharma)
- Tamannaah Bhatia as Avanthika
- Ramya Krishna as Sivagami Devi
- Nassar as Bijjaladeva
- Sathyaraj as Karikala Kattappa (Voiced by P. Ravi Shankar)
- Subbaraju as Kumara Varma, Devasena's Brother's Brother-in-law
- Prudhvi Raj as the Prime Minister of the Kunthala kingdom
- Rohini Molleti as Sanga, Mahendra's adoptive mother.
- Meka Ramakrishna as Jaya Varma, Devasena's brother and the former king of Kunthala.
- Rakesh Varre as Sethupathi, a friend of Bhallaladeva who takes the role of army commander after Baahubali is dismissed.
- Ashok Kumar
- IMAX Venkat as Sivudu's foster father
- Ramaraju
- Danny Kuttappa
- Kosaraju Adithya
- CVB Subrahmanyam
- Madhu Prakash
- Lavi Pajni
- Shatru as the leader of the Pindari tribe. They lay siege to Kunthala and Amarendra kills the leader and drowns the rest of the army.
- Bharani Shankar
- Charandeep as the Kalakeya King's brother, who takes role of the chief of the Kalakeyas. He is killed by Baahubali.
- Abhinaya Krishna as Kumara Varma's assistant
- Pramila Rani
- Kalpa Latha as an inhabitant of Mahishmathi
- Sri Simha Koduri as Kunthala rebel
- Rayala Harishchandra as an inhabitant of Mahishmathi
- Ajay Ghosh as a dacoit (Deleted Scenes)
- Ayyappa P. Sharma as Royal Priest

== Production ==
Baahubali 2: The Conclusion was produced in the Telugu film industry. (Note: Attributed to multiple sources) Unlike the first film, Baahubali 2 was shot primarily in Telugu; however, only certain close-up shots and dialogue scenes—mainly those involving Ramya Krishna, Nassar, and Sathyaraj—were additionally filmed in Tamil to improve lip-sync for the Tamil release. (Note: The CBFC certificate of the Tamil version Baahubali 2: The Conclusion indicates that it is not a dubbed version.) As of July 2015, the film series was considered the most expensive in India.

Rajamouli's father V. Vijayendra Prasad who wrote stories for most of his films once again gave the story for Baahubali. The series was produced by Shobu Yarlagadda and Prasad Devineni. R. C. Kamalakannan was chosen as visual effects supervisor and Kotagiri Venkateswara Rao was the editor. PM Satheesh was the sound designer and stunt sequences were coordinated by King Solomon, Lee Whittaker, and Kecha Khamphakdee. The film's costume designers are Rama Rajamouli and Prasanthi Tripuraneni. The line producer was M.M Srivalli. The film shooting started on 17 December 2015 at Ramoji Film City in Hyderabad with Prabhas and Ramya Krishna. The film featuring actors Prabhas and Rana Daggubati in the lead roles became the biggest ever movie in India in terms of scale of production and making as of 2017. The film is also known by the abbreviation BB2. Sabu Cyril was the production designer and Peter Hein was the choreographer. R. C. Kamalakannan was the VFX supervisor and was assisted by Pete Draper and Adel Adili, co-founder of Makuta VFX. In order for the lip sync to not be noticeable when dubbed in various languages, the film featured less dialogues and more action scenes.

=== Casting ===
Prabhas was cast as main lead of the film. Anushka Shetty was cast as the lead actress of the film as she was also a part of Mirchi (2013). She coincidentally became the first heroine Rajamouli repeated in his films and thus made her schedules full for 2013 and 2014. Rana Daggubati was cast as the antagonist of the film.

Actor Nassar was selected to play a supporting role. Charandeep was selected to play the brother of the film's chief villain. Unlike the first part, Tamannaah Bhatia's role in Baahubali 2: The Conclusion was minor. She was initially not supposed to be a part of the sequel, but given the success of the predecessor, she was a part of three scenes. Meka Ramakrishna was picked for the head of the Kuntala guerillas.

=== Characters and looks ===
Rana Daggubati was said to be playing the role of Prabhas' brother and he too underwent a lot of physical transformation satisfying the role he was assigned to play in the film. He also underwent training in martial arts under the supervision of a Vietnamese trainer, Tuan. Sathyaraj has a tonsured look for his role in the film. In the end of October 2013, Rana appeared at a fashion show with a beefed up body which, according to him, was a part of his look in the film. In mid-May 2014, reports emerged that Anushka would play a pregnant woman for a few sequences in the second part of the film.

At the same time, Prabhas posted on his Facebook page that he underwent minor shoulder surgery and would join the film's sets in a span of a month. On 1 June 2014, Prabhas and Rana's trainer Lakshman Reddy, said that Prabhas started his training 8 months before the commencement of shooting and after two years, both of them weighed nearly 100 kilos each. He also added that Prabhas has two attires with a heavy, bulky body for Baahubali's role and a lean physique for the second role. For his look, Prabhas met WWE superstars like The Undertaker in February 2014 and interacted with them about their daily regimen and workouts.

Prabhas had equipment costing ₹1.5 crore shipped to his home, where he built a personal gym. His breakfast included 40 half-boiled egg whites blended and added with protein powder. In mid-June 2014, Tamannaah Bhatia regarding her role in the film, said that she would be playing the role of a warrior princess named Avanthika and her appearance in the film is completely different when compared to her past films. Before joining the film's shoot, Bhatia did costume trials for the film which she confirmed in her micro-blogging page stating "I am very excited to get on to the set of Baahubali. I did some dress trials today and my look in this movie will be totally new. I have never been seen in such sort of a look till now. It will be a new role for me". Rajamouli called Bhatia and her characterisation as a "value addition" to the movie. She stated that she plays Avanthika, and had a special training and diet regime. The film introduced a new language called Kiliki.

=== Piracy ===
On 22 November 2016, a two-minute war sequence from the film was leaked and posted on Facebook and Twitter. The following day, the police arrested a video editor for stealing and uploading the scenes. The Deccan Chronicle, noticing the lack of punishment, felt the leak was a publicity stunt. Following this, a nine-minute war sequence supposedly from the climax was leaked. The video lacked VFX.

== Themes and influences ==
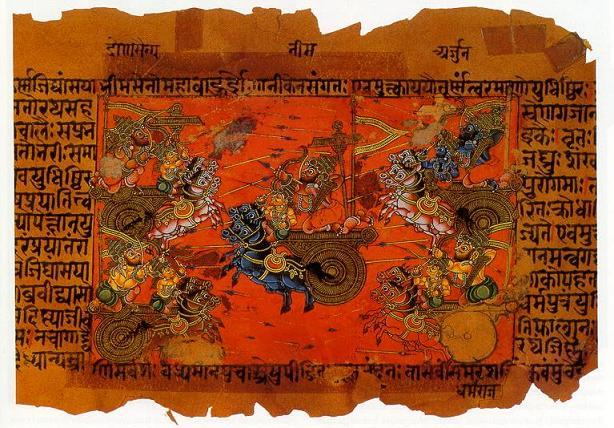
Manuscript illustration of the Battle of Kurukshetra

Director S. S. Rajamouli revealed that Baahubali is inspired by the epic Mahabharata. V. Vijayendra Prasad, the screenwriter and Rajamouli's father who wrote stories for most of Rajamouli's films, once again penned the story for Baahubali. Vijayendra Prasad revealed that Sivagami has shades of both Kunti and Kaikeyi while Devasena is a warrior like Sita. He further added that he sees Baahubali as the story of Sivagami and Devasena. He was also inspired by tales of Chandamama and Amar Chitra Katha comics.

In March 2017, Rajamouli said in an interview that "Why Kattappa killed Baahubali" is the theme of the film. The tagline "The boy he raised, the man he killed" was billed in a poster featuring Kattappa. Rajamouli had stated that the Mahabharata was a source of inspiration for the film. According to K. K. Senthil Kumar, the colour palette used was based on the "mood and feel". He contrasts different tones used within the film: warm colours for Mahishmati, cool colours for Kunthala, desaturated colours for the frame in which Baahubali is expelled.

According to Chandan Gowda, a professor at the Azim Premji University, "the social order [in the film] appears to be a varna order: Brahmins, Kshatriyas and Vaishyas are named with the Shudras staying an unnamed presence," also noting that "Muslims are also part of the Mahishmati kingdom". Kathi Mahesh felt that the modules and imagery were borrowed from Indian epics like Mahabharata and called Prabhas' character "a mix of the Pandavas put together," while Gowda writes that the influence is "at best rough," stating that the film cannot match the "moral depth or complexity" of Mahabharata. He further contrasts the themes of both, writing, "the heroes have failings and the villains redeeming virtues, making us morally ambivalent towards them both, Baahubali goes for black and white: its heroes are wholly good and the villains pure evil". According to Gowda, the palace scenes resemble those in Ben Hur (1959) and Troy (2004) while the fight sequences are similar to the Chinese films Crouching Tiger, Hidden Dragon (2000).

Critics noticed similarities between Baahubali 2 and The Lion King, an adaptation of William Shakespeare's Hamlet (1599–1602). This similarity was also felt by fans, who created memes of the comparison. The Indian Express makes a comparison, stating that both films are a tale of two brothers, where inhabitants suffer under a cruel ruler, who is the brother of a kind ruler. The son of the kind ruler grows in remote lands, unaware of his lineage, guided to his home by his love interest. The spouse of the kind ruler is treated badly by the cruel ruler. The son also has an advisor, who helps him realize his identity. They further note that the kind ruler and his son look similar in both films. Firstpost notes that both Bhallaladeva and Scar share a scar on one eye, and both Simba and Mahendra are introduced similarly into the world.

== Music ==
Rajamouli's cousin M. M. Keeravani composed the music and background for the film. The Conclusion's Telugu soundtrack was released on 26 March 2017 at the pre-release event of the film at YMCA grounds. The album of the film's Hindi version was released on 5 April 2017, while the Tamil version was released on 9 April. The Malayalam version was released on 24 April 2017.

Baahubali The Beginning is first non-English film to be screened at Royal Albert Hall in London, receives a standing ovation. The show, saw the score performed live while the epic action movie unfolded on the big screen, a special Q&A took place on stage. Baahubali franchise director S.S Rajamouli and composer M.M. Keeravani as well as stars Prabhas, Anushka Shetty and Rana Daggubati, sat down with Rachel Dwyer for a chat.

== Release ==
Initially scheduled for release in the summer of 2016, the release date of Baahubali 2 was postponed to November 2016 due to preparations for the international release of The Beginning in various locations. This was further pushed to 28 April 2017. At first, the joint budget of both The Beginning and The Conclusion was speculated to be around ₹2.5 billion. This was later confirmed by Rajamouli in 2015. However, the joint budget of the series was increased to ₹4.3 billion, of which ₹1.8 billion was the budget for The Beginning and ₹2.5 billion for The Conclusion. The climax of The Conclusion alone cost ₹30 crore, almost double the amount of The Beginning's climax.

=== Screenings and statistics ===
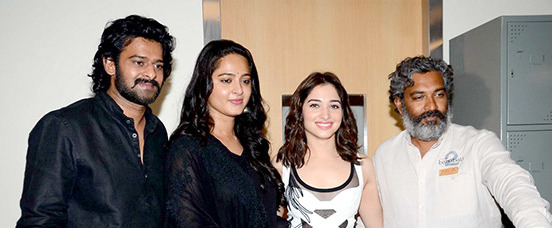
From left to right: Prabhas, Anushka Shetty, Tamannaah Bhatia, S. S. Rajamouli at the film's first look launch in 2016

An initial limited release of Baahubali 2 took place in most Gulf countries, including the UAE, on 27 April 2017. In India, the film was released on 28 April. The film was screened at the British Film Institute. It was also premiered at the 39th Moscow International Film Festival. The film was also showcased at the 49th International Film Festival of India in the "Indian Panorama" section. According to Umair Sandhu, a member of the UAE censor board, Baahubali 2 received a standing ovation from the board during its review. On 22 April, the Telugu version of Baahubali 2 was reviewed by the Central Board of Film Certification and given an U/A rating with minor cuts. The Japanese Censor Board gave a rating of G with no cuts. The Central Board of Film Censors, Pakistan, cleared the film with an "all clear" status and zero cuts. In Singapore, the film received an 'A' (adult) certificate, which an Indiatimes report attributes to the portrayal of violent scenes.

Baahubali 2 was released across more than 9,000 plus screens worldwide- 6500 screens in India alone, breaking the record for the widest Indian film release. It released in conventional 2D as well as in IMAX format. This made Baahubali 2 the third Indian film to release in IMAX, following Dhoom 3 and Bang Bang!. It was released in Telugu and Tamil along with dubbed versions in Hindi and Malayalam. (Note: Despite being made in Tamil, the Tamil version was considered as a dubbed film in trade circuits.) In Kerala, the film was released across 395 screens. The film was released in 1,100 screens in the United States, and 150 screens in Canada. The Hindi version was released in New Zealand, Australia and Fiji Islands, while the Tamil version was released in Malaysia. In Pakistan, the Hindi version was released in over 100 screens. The first Telugu film to be released in 4K high definition format, close to 200 screens were upgraded to 4K projectors before the release date of the film. In Japan, the film was later dubbed into Japanese and was released on 29 December. Despite the various measures taken, pirated versions of Baahubali 2 were available on the Internet within hours of the film's release. The film was dubbed in Russian and released in Russia and neighboring territories on 11 January 2018. It was censored for release in China in March 2018 and was released in Chinese on 4 May 2018.

=== Distribution ===
Distributor	Languages	Territories
Great India Films	All	USA and Canada
Sarigama Cinema	All	Europe and Ireland
MSK Film Production	Telugu, Tamil, Malayalam	Malaysia, Singapore, Sri Lanka
A. A. Films Pvt. Ltd.	Hindi	Entire World except USA, Canada
Hasini Entertainment	Telugu, Tamil, Malayalam	UK, Ireland
Phars Films Co LLC	Telugu, Tamil, Malayalam	Middle East
Southern Star International	Telugu, Tamil, Malayalam	Australia and New Zealand
Gopi Krishna Movies	Hindi	Nepal

== Marketing ==
A 25-member marketing team at Arka was responsible for marketing Baahubali 2. On 30 September 2016, the logo of Baahubali 2 was revealed along with the tagline 'Why Kattappa Killed Baahubali'. On 22 October 2016, the first look poster of the film was released on the birthday of Prabhas. The poster, according to CNN-News18, features Prabhas flexing his muscles, holding a two edged sword and a chain in either of his hands, while The Hindu notices the presence of Amarendra Baahubali in the background. Rana Daggubati's first look as Bhallaladeva was further revealed on his birthday. According to The Indian Express, the poster features Rana Daggubati as Bhallaladeva with "a vicious glare, salt-and-pepper hair with a bun, cladding a bullish armour and holding a humongous retractable mace". A virtual reality teaser was also released. On 26 January 2017, the first look poster of Anushka Shetty as Devasena was released. The trailer of the film was released on 17 March 2017.

Baahubali 2 was also promoted extensively on social media platforms including Facebook, Twitter and Instagram. Upon being asked about the film's marketing, Yarlagadda said, "The idea was to engage with different demographics, who are interested in different things. If you are into technology, then Baahubali VR becomes a driving factor for you to watch the film; if you are into graphic novels and gaming, we had plans to address those needs too". A graphic novel titled Baahubali – The Battle of the Bold was released digitally on 28 February 2017. Rajamouli approached Anand Neelakantan to write a series subtitled Before the Beginning. The first novel in the series, titled The Rise of Sivagami, was released on 7 March 2017. A clothing line based on the film was revealed on 7 April at a fashion show, with the cast including Rana Daggubati and Tamanaah attending it. The makers further collaborated with Moonfrog Labs to create an online multiplayer game titled Baahubali – The Game, which published on 28 April 2017. In a review for the game, Srivathsan Nadadhur of The Hindu writes, "while it seems a little familiar, it is good fun as long as it lasts". The cast arrived in Dubai to inaugurate the film's release in a promotional event on 25 April 2017.

=== Rights and sales ===
Cinestaan AA Distributors distributed the Hindi version in US, Britain, Australia and New Zealand. Srinivasan of Says S Pictures distributed the film in North Arcot and South Arcot in Tamil Nadu. The Hindi version was distributed in North India by Anil Thadani's AA Films and presented by Karan Johar's Dharma Productions. In Malaysia, the film was distributed by MSK Film Production and Antenna Entertainments. Amjad Rasheed distributed the film in Pakistan. Telugu, Tamil and Malayalam broadcasting rights were brought by Star India for ₹28 crore. Sony acquired the satellite rights for the Hindi version for ₹50 crore. Baahubali 2 set a record collection of ₹5 billion before the release of the film through satellite and theatrical rights. The Telugu version of the film was insured against financial loss by Future Generali for ₹2 crore. Netflix brought the rights of Baahubali 2 for ₹25.5 crore.

About 10 lakh tickets were sold within 24 hours of the advance booking. Tickets were sold out until 2 May. Later, tickets for the first week were sold out. The sale rate was the highest ever in India, beating the record held by Dangal. Booking sites of multiplex players crashed down due to high traffic. In UAE, the film sold more one lakh tickets before release, the highest ever for an Indian film, breaking the record held by Fast and Furious bookings. BookMyShow and PayTM offered discounts on Baahubali 2 tickets. At the end of its theatrical run in India Baahubali 2 had sold an estimated 10 crore tickets, the highest estimated footfall for any film in India in decades; Box Office India notes that the estimated footfalls of Mother India (1957), Mughal-e-Azam (1960) and Sholay (1975) could be more than that of Baahubali 2.

=== Complications ===
The morning shows of Baahubali 2 in several cinema theatres across Tamil Nadu were halted. Arka Media Works had to intervene to resolve the financial issues and had to bear the full cost for the smooth release of the film. Scenes from Baahubali 2 were released online 2 days before the film's release. Activists in Karnataka threatened to stall the film's release in their state due to a statement made by Sathyaraj concerning the Cauvery river, unless the actor apologized. Sathyaraj later apologized for hurting the sentiments of the activists. The entertainment tax to be paid on each ticket was not paid, due to the sale of unaccounted tickets.

== Reception ==
On the review aggregator website Rotten Tomatoes, 88% of 26 critics' reviews are positive, with an average rating of 7.6/10.

=== India ===
Rachit Gupta from Filmfare gave the film a rating of 4.5/5, stating, "SS Rajamouli's much-awaited sequel is the kind of movie Indian cinema should make regularly. Its the kind of sweeping magnum opus that Indian mythos and culture deserve. Its the biggest film we have ever made and barring a few minor glitches in CGI, this film is possibly the greatest spectacle you'll see on a big screen, in your life". Sangeetha Devi Dundoo from The Hindu stated, "For the most part, The Conclusion doesn't let us take our eyes off the screen. Its designed to be a cinematic celebration, one that deserves to be watched on the largest screen possible". Anupama Subramanian of the Deccan Chronicle gave the film a 3.5/5, praising the acting of the stars while complaining about "the lack of a solid plot' and called the ending "predictable".

Vishnuprasad Pillai of Asianet News gave a negative review, writing that the film "offers nothing new... The writing from KV Vijayendra Prasad fails inspire or to do justice to an epic of such scale," adding that "the dialogues at times are downright corny and plot developments cringe-worthy". Dipanjan Sinha of Hindustan Times gave the film a rating of 3/5 stars, praising the film's cinematography and special effects, but found faults with some of the female characters. Sinha stated, "Devasena ... starts off as an ace warrior only to be tamed into someone who has to be protected". Shubhra Gupta of The Indian Express rated the film 2/5 stars, noting problems with pacing and sound, writing, "The background music is relentless, and the pitch at which the declamatory dialogues are delivered is deafening: there were times I felt like closing my ears". Taran Adarsh of Bollywood Hungama rates the film 4.5 out of 5 and praises the performance of the cast, writing, "Its a feast for moviegoers and has the trappings to make all generations its fan".

Meena Iyer from The Times of India rated it 4/5, writing: "Just savor it. It is a visual extravaganza that India must feast on ... Prabhas is terrific as father and son. Of course, it is CGI and VFX that grab you in your seat". Hemanth Kumar from Firstpost called it "Rajamouli's epic drama" and rated it 4/5. Sukanya Verma from Rediff rated the film 3.5/5, writing the film, "continues its tradition of grandiloquence and magnitude... high drama, more than spectacle, is what lends its riveting tale of revenge and glory all its wallop and wizardry". She also praised the film's cast and director stating, "Equipped with a cast that's not only in tune with Rajamouli's vision but knows exactly where to hold back and when to give their all adds to Baahubali's might". Sudhir Suryawanshi of The New Indian Express wrote that "Baahubali 2: The Conclusion is deserving of high praise if only for the visceral experience it is".

=== International ===
It was further featured in Rotten Tomatoes' list of Best Off the Radar Films of 2017, in which Tim Ryan writes, "Baahubali 2: The Conclusion plays like a shotgun wedding between Ben Hur and Kung Fu Hustle, seasoned with bits of Shakespeare, Kurosawa, and Buster Keaton," opining, "it's a blockbuster that's both gigantic and lighter than air". Mike McCahill of The Guardian gave a 4/5 rating and called it "a jaw-dropping blockbuster that combines nimble action with genuine heart". He also stated, "This production's triumph is the room it's granted Rajamouli to head into the fields and dream up endlessly expressive ways to frame bodies in motion. Of the many sequences here primed to cut through jadedness, perhaps the most wondrous is that which finds Baahu guiding Deva mid-battle to shoot three arrows simultaneously – a set piece that speaks both to a love of action, and love in action. The budget's big, the muscle considerable, but they're nothing compared with Baahubali's heart".

Manjusha Radhakrishnan of Gulf News rates the film 3.5 out of 5 and writes, "This is a sweeping visual spectacle filled with epic battle scenes, clashes between warring troops from Indian mythology and elephants on a rampage," but further added, "There were times in the second half where you felt the computer-generated graphics took over the story. But all this is new and exotic for Indian cinema". Shilpa Jamkhandikar of Reuters writes, "It may not up the ante from the last film, but it doesn't let up on the pace either. For an Indian film, that is no mean feat". J Hurtado of Screen Anarchy writes, "It's a bit daunting because it does begin in media res immediately following the complex actions of the first film, but astute viewers will put together the pieces soon enough".

Simon Abrams of RogerEbert.com gave the film a 4/4 rating and writes the film "is everything I want but rarely get from superhero and big-budget fantasy movie" adding "the fight scenes... are so creative that they make even the most frequently abused creative shortcuts seem novel, everything from computer-generated imagery (CGI) to speed-ramping... You care what happens to the cast as they, aided by wires, hurl volleys of arrows at disposable minions and CGI animals". Anita Iyer from Khaleej Times rates the film 3.5 out of 5 and writes, "What stands out in the film is the powerful star cast. Enough has been said already about the acting prowess of Prabhas but he has an equally supportive cast to hold the film. Ramya Krishna as Sivagami, is known for her impressive acting talent and proves her mettle here. Another veteran, Sathyaraj as Katappa excels and you develop a camaraderie with him. Rana Daggubati is aptly spiteful in his portrayal of the villain... Nassar, as his father, is busy spewing venom but his role could have been meatier".

In 2026, The Guardian ranked Baahubali 2 as the second best mythological film of all time, tied with its predecessor Baahubali.

== Box office ==
Baahubali 2 grossed ₹2.17 billion on its opening day and ₹5.10 billion in its opening weekend worldwide. It became the highest-grossing Indian film worldwide with a gross of ₹7.92 billion in six days. The film was the first Indian film to enter the 1000 Crore Club, grossing over ₹10 billion in all languages in India, and it further grossed over ₹12.5 billion in all languages by the end of two weeks. The film grossed over ₹1,429.83 crore in India and over ₹380.77 crore overseas, for a total estimated worldwide gross of ₹1,810.60 during its theatrical run. (Note: 1,810.60 crore (Bollywood Hungama and Box Office India))

Territories	Gross revenue
United States	US$20,186,659 (₹129.76 crore (Note: Calculated using an approximate average exchange rate of 65.11 INR per USD in 2017))
Canada	
Arab Gulf States (GCC)	US$11,101,366 (₹72.28 crore)
United Kingdom	$971,117
Spain	$45,022
Australia	$2,688,319
New Zealand	
China	US$11,951,545 (₹80.15 crore (Note: Calculated using an approximate average exchange rate of 67.06 INR per USD in 2018))
Japan	¥250 million (₹15 crore (Note: Calculated using an approximate average exchange rate of .6 INR per JPY in 2018))
Russia	5,218,946 ₽ (₹62.63 lakh (Note: Calculated using an approximate average exchange rate of 2.2 INR per RUB in 2018))
Rest of the world	
Overseas	₹380.77 crore
India	₹1,429.83 crore
Worldwide	₹1,810.60 crore

=== Domestic ===
Baahubali 2 grossed ₹152 crore in India on its first day of release. Within three days, the film grossed ₹382 crore, setting the record for the highest opening weekend gross in India. In five days, it became the highest-grossing film in India with a total gross of ₹558 crore. The film crossed the ₹1000 crore net mark in India across all languages within 30 days.

Regionally, Baahubali 2 grossed ₹327.9 crore in Andhra Pradesh and Telangana, ₹152.6 crore in Tamil Nadu, ₹129 crore in Karnataka, and ₹75 crore in Kerala. In the rest of India, it grossed approximately ₹732 crore, bringing the film's total gross in India to ₹1417 crore, the highest for any film in the country.

=== Overseas ===
Baahubali 2 grossed ₹65 crore overseas on the first day of its release, the highest opening for an Indian film, surpassing Kabali. In 3 days, the film collected ₹128 crore from the overseas market, with ₹67.05 crore coming from the US alone, setting a record for 3-day collections. The film grossed $79.35 million during the opening weekend, ranking third on the global box office list, and earned $10.43 million in the United States alone, the highest-ever opening for an Indian film in the US. On 3 May 2017, Baahubali 2 became the highest-grossing Indian film at the US box office with $12.5 million, surpassing Dangal's gross of $12.3 million. The film had grossed US$20 million in the United States.

Baahubali 2 became the first Indian film to exceed $11.1 million in takings in the Middle East-GCC-Gulf region, surpassing Bajrangi Bhaijaan. In China, it made a number-three debut at the box office (behind domestic Chinese films Us and Them and A or B) with an opening-day gross of $2.41 million, surpassing the lifetime gross of Baahubali: The Beginning ($1.8 million). The film grossed $7.67 million in its opening weekend. In Japan, the film grossed $1.3 million by April 2018, ranking as the third highest-grossing Indian film in the country, behind Rajinikanth's Tamil film Muthu (1995) and Aamir Khan's Hindi film 3 Idiots (2009). By May 2018, the film had earned ¥150 million, and its total gross reached ¥250 million by September 2018.

== Accolades ==
Baahubali 2 won the Telstra People's Choice Award at the Indian Film Festival of Melbourne, sharing the prize with Dangal. Tamannaah Bhatia and K.V. Vijayendra Prasad won the Global Indian Impact Icon Award for Baahubali 2 at NRI of the Year Awards. The CNN-IBN Indian of the Year Awards (2017) for Outstanding Achievement in Entertainment was given to Team Baahubali. Prabhas, Shetty, Keeravani, Rajamouli were nominated for Favorite Hero Of The Year, Favorite Heroine of the Year, Favorite Music Director and Favourite Director respectively, while Saahore Baahubali and the film were nominated for Favourite Song and Favourite Film at the Zee Telugu Golden Awards. Baahubali 2 won the Saturn Award for Best International Film at the 44th Saturn Awards. At the 65th National Film Awards, it won in three categories: Best Stunt Choreography, Best Special Effects and Best Popular Film Providing Wholesome Entertainment. Baahubali 2 also received nominations in every category (except Best Male Playback Singer – Telugu) at the 65th Filmfare Awards South. It also won in all categories, except for Best Actor, Best Actress and Best Playback Singer – Female. It got two nominations at the 10th Mirchi Music Awards.

== Legacy and impact ==
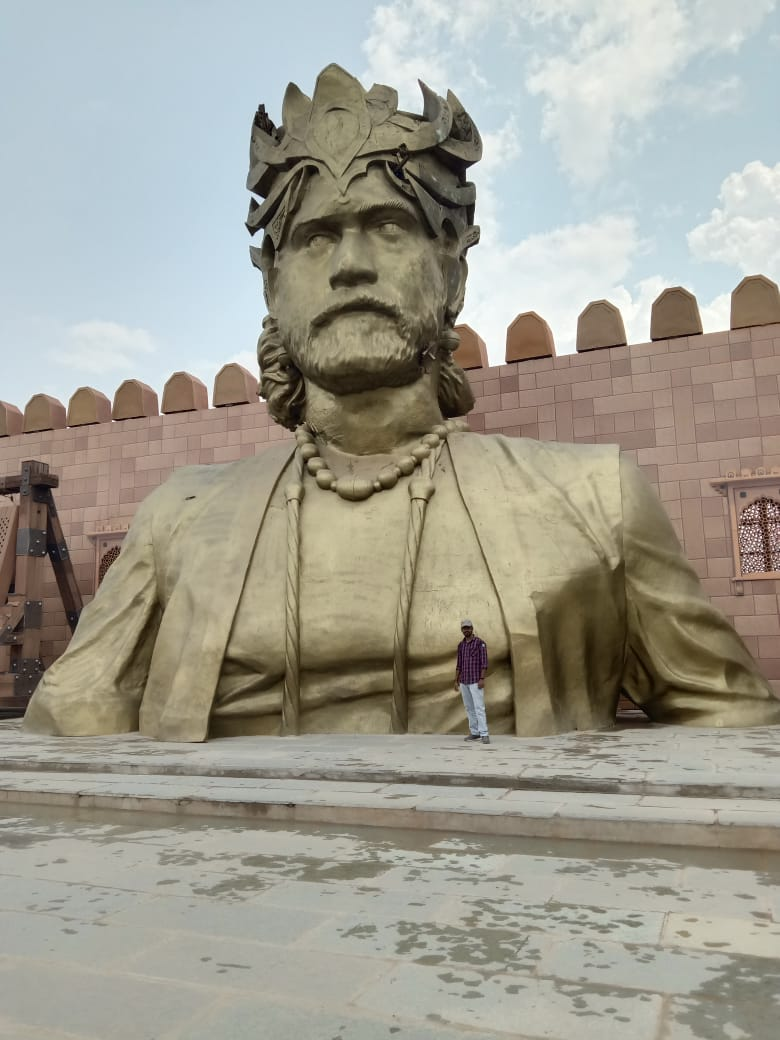
Bhallaladeva statue in Ramoji Film City for tourism

Baahubali 2 along with its predecessor is widely regarded as one of the most influential films in Indian Cinema. It made a lasting impact on Indian filmmaking process. The success of Baahubali cleared the way for more grand-scale preparations and has set modern measures for narrating, visual impacts, cinematic aspiration, humongous budget, high-end action sequences, a massive canvas and film franchise phenomenon in Indian movies. The film inspired directors like Prashant Neel and Ayan Mukerji for making big budget action films.

The duology of Baahubali franchise started a new film movement, pan-Indian film, that is, rather than remaking the same film in various languages, they are dubbing the same film in various languages. Srivatsan S of The Hindu wrote that Telugu cinema has excelled in marketing Pan-Indian films. It primarily employed two strategies – promoting the film outside their home territory and collaborating with other regional stars for more visibility.

The film received appreciation from members of the Indian film industry. Rajinikanth praised Baahubali 2, calling Rajamouli "god's own child" and equating the film to "Indian cinema's pride". Chiranjeevi praised the film and stated that Rajamouli "deserved all accolades" for making the film. Mahesh Bhatt called it "a game changer" that "redefines everything you thought you knew and understood about Indian movies". His daughter Alia Bhatt called the film a "rock buster". Mahesh Babu stated the film "exceed expectations," while Shekhar Kapur congratulated Rajamouli. Shah Rukh Khan, despite not watching the film, praised it and said, "But if you want to create that big cinema and that big dream to sell to a big number of people, you have to have guts to take that storytelling on and say it in the biggest, nicest, boldest way possible. Baahubali stands for that".

Prasad had confirmed that a third cinematic part will not occur in the franchise. However, Yarlagadda said, "We have an animated series that is premiering on Amazon. Then we have graphic and regular novels that will tell us the backstory of the Mahishmati kingdom. We want to make the story of Sivagami – how she became a power centre into a TV series in a grand way. There is also a virtual reality experience. We have many more plans where fans can engage in the world of Bahubali". This was also confirmed by Prabhas, who said, "We are done with the story of Baahubali, there cannot be a third part. But the world and the legacy of Baahubali will live on through a comic series and a TV series".

Baahubali 2 was the most talked about film in India on Twitter in 2017. On Google, the film was the most searched topic and most searched film in India for the year 2017. Worldwide, it was the 7th most searched film in 2017. The song "Saahore Baahubali" topped the list of most searched for songs in India. Owing to the success of the film, the set of the film at the Ramoji Film City was opened for tourism. According to Firstpost, the only phenomenon comparable to the "Baahubali mania" was Rajinikanth fandom. The Wikipedia article on Baahubali 2 became the most read film article on the encyclopedia in 2017. The Baahubali 2 trailer was the second most viewed in the year of 2017 on YouTube with more than 29 million views behind the Avengers: Infinity War trailer.
