= List of Indian films of 2021 =

Indian Films
- Previous: List of Indian films of 2020; Next: List of Indian films of 2022

This is the box office list of Indian films that are released in 2021.

== Box office collection ==
The list of highest-grossing Indian films released in 2021, by worldwide box office gross revenue, are as follows:

*	Denotes films still running in cinemas worldwide

Implies that the film is multilingual and the gross collection figure includes the worldwide collection of the other simultaneously filmed version.

Highest worldwide gross of 2021
Rank	Title	Production company	Language	Worldwide gross	Ref
1	Pushpa: The Rise	Mythri Movie Makers; Mutamsetty Media	Telugu	₹350 crore (US$47.35 million)—₹360 crore (US$48.7 million)	
2	Sooryavanshi	Reliance Entertainment; Rohit Shetty Picturez; Dharma Productions; Cape of Good Films	Hindi	₹298 crore (US$40.31 million)	
3	Master	XB Film Creators	Tamil	₹220 crore (US$29.76 million)—₹300 crore (US$40.59 million)	
4	Annaatthe	Sun Pictures	Tamil	₹200 crore (US$27.06 million)—₹240 crore (US$32.47 million)	
5	83	Reliance Entertainment; Phantom Films; Vibri Media; KA Productions; Nadiadwala Grandson Entertainment; Kabir Khan Films	Hindi	₹193.73 crore (US$26.21 million)	
6	Vakeel Saab	Sri Venkateswara Creations	Telugu	₹137.65 crore (US$18.62 million)	
7	Akhanda	Dwaraka Creations	Telugu	₹120 crore (US$16.23 million)-₹150 crore (US$20.29 million)	
8	Maanaadu	V House Productions	Tamil	₹110 crore (US$14.88 million)—₹117 crore (US$15.83 million)	
9	Doctor	KJR Studios / SK Productions	Tamil	₹100 crore (US$13.53 million)	
10	Uppena	Mythri Movie Makers / Sukumar Writings	Telugu	₹83 crore (US$11.23 million)—₹100 crore (US$13.53 million)	

== Lists of Indian films of 2021 ==
- List of Bhojpuri films of 2021
- List of Hindi films of 2021
- List of Punjabi films of 2021
- List of Indian Bengali films of 2021
- List of Gujarati films of 2021
- List of Kannada films of 2021
- List of Malayalam films of 2021
- List of Marathi films of 2021
- List of Tamil films of 2021
- List of Telugu films of 2021

== See also ==
- Bhagavadajjukam, a 2021 Sanskrit language Indian film
- List of Indian films of 2022
- List of Indian films of 2020

Preceded by 2020	Indian films 2021	Succeeded by 2022
