= List of Indian films of 2019 =

Indian Films
- Previous: List of Indian films of 2018; Next: List of Indian films of 2020

This is the list of Indian films that are released in 2019

== Box office collection ==
The list of highest-grossing Indian films released in 2019, by worldwide box office gross revenue, are as follows:

#+	Implies that the film is multilingual and the gross collection figure includes the worldwide collection of the other simultaneously filmed version.

Highest worldwide gross of 2019
Rank	Title	Production company	Language	Worldwide gross	Ref.
1	War	Yash Raj Films	Hindi	₹475.5 crore (equivalent to ₹645 crore or US$67 million in 2026)	
2	Saaho	UV Creations; T-Series	Telugu; Hindi	₹434–439 crore	(Note: Saaho's reported worldwide grosses vary between ₹434 crore (Deccan Herald) – ₹439 crore (India Today))
3	Kabir Singh	T-Series; Cine1 Studios	Hindi	₹379.02 crore (equivalent to ₹514 crore or US$53 million in 2026)	
4	Uri: The Surgical Strike	RSVP Movies	Hindi	₹342.06 crore (equivalent to ₹464 crore or US$48 million in 2026)	
5	Bharat	Reel Life Productions; Salman Khan Films; T-Series	Hindi	₹325.58 crore (equivalent to ₹442 crore or US$46 million in 2026)	
6	Good Newwz	Zee Studios; Dharma Productions; Cape of Good Films	Hindi	₹318.57 crore (equivalent to ₹432 crore or US$45 million in 2026)	
7	Bigil	AGS Entertainment	Tamil	₹305 crore (equivalent to ₹414 crore or US$43 million in 2026)	
8	Housefull 4	Nadiadwala Grandson Entertainment; Fox Star Studios	Hindi	₹296−305 crore (equivalent to ₹−414 crore or US$−43 million in 2026)	
9	Mission Mangal	Cape of Good Films; Hope Productions; Fox Star Studios	Hindi	₹295.59 crore (equivalent to ₹401 crore or US$42 million in 2026)	
10	Sye Raa Narasimha Reddy	Konidela Production Company	Telugu	₹240.6 crore (equivalent to ₹326 crore or US$34 million in 2026)	

== Lists of Indian films of 2019 ==
- List of Assamese films of 2019
- List of Bengali films of 2019
- List of Hindi films of 2019
- List of Gujarati films of 2019
- List of Kannada films of 2019
- List of Malayalam films of 2019
- List of Marathi films of 2019
- List of Odia films of 2019
- List of Punjabi films of 2019
- List of Tamil films of 2019
- List of Telugu films of 2019
- List of Tulu films of 2019

== Notes ==
Preceded by 2018	Indian films 2019	Succeeded by 2020
