= List of Indian films of 2010 =

Provided below is the list of Indian films released on 2010.

== Box office collection ==
The list of highest-grossing Indian films released in 2010, by worldwide box office gross revenue, are as follows:

Highest worldwide gross of 2023.
Rank	Title	Production company	Language	Worldwide gross	Ref
1	Enthiran	Sun Pictures	Tamil	₹250 crore (US$26 million)–₹320 crore (US$33 million)	(Note: The Times of India mentioned the collection to be ₹250 crore. But IB Times reported that the collection was ₹283 crore, India Today stated that the collection was approximately ₹290 crore. While Box Office India stated the collection to be over 320 crore.)
2	My Name Is Khan	Dharma Productions; Red Chillies Entertainment	Hindi	₹223.44 crore (US$23 million)	
3	Dabangg	Arbaaz Khan Productions; Shree Ashtavinayak Cine Vision	Hindi	₹221.14 crore (US$23 million)	
4	Golmaal 3	Eros International	Hindi	₹169.09 crore (US$18 million)	
5	Raajneeti	Prakash Jha Productions; Walkwater Media Ltd	Hindi	₹149.53 crore (US$16 million)	
6	Housefull	Nadiadwala Grandson Entertainment	Hindi	₹123.69 crore (US$13 million)	
7	Tees Maar Khan	Hari Om Entertainment; Three's Company; UTV Motion Pictures	Hindi	₹101.89 crore (US$11 million)	

== Lists of Indian films of 2010 ==
- List of Bengali films of 2010
- List of Hindi films of 2010
- List of Kannada films of 2010
- List of Malayalam films of 2010
- List of Marathi films of 2010
- List of Odia films of 2010
- List of Punjabi films of 2010
- List of Tamil films of 2010
- List of Telugu films of 2010

== Notes ==
Preceded by 2009	Indian films 2010	Succeeded by 2011
