= List of Indian films of 2020 =

Indian Films
- Previous: List of Indian films of 2019; Next: List of Indian films of 2021

This is the list of Indian films that are released in 2020

== Box office collection ==
The list of highest-grossing Indian films released in 2020, by worldwide box office gross revenue, are as follows:

*	Denotes films still running in cinemas worldwide

Implies that the film is multilingual and the gross collection figure includes the worldwide collection of the other simultaneously filmed version.

Highest worldwide gross of 2020.
Rank	Title	Production company	Language	Worldwide gross	Ref
1	Tanhaji	Ajay Devgn FFilms; T-Series	Hindi	₹368 crore (US$49.66 million)	
2	Ala Vaikunthapurramuloo	Haarika & Hassini Creations; Geetha Arts	Telugu	₹280 crore (US$37.79 million)	
3	Sarileru Neekevaru	AK Entertainments; Sri Venkateswara Creations; G. Mahesh Babu Entertainment Pvt. Ltd	Telugu	₹260 crore (US$35.09 million)	
4	Darbar	Lyca Productions	Tamil	₹202 crore (US$27.26 million)—₹250 crore (US$33.74 million)	
5	Baaghi 3	Nadiadwala Grandson Entertainment; Fox Star Studios	Hindi	₹137.05 crore (US$18.5 million)	
6	Street Dancer 3D	T-Series; Remo D'Souza Entertainment	Hindi	₹102 crore (US$13.77 million)	
7	Shubh Mangal Zyada Saavdhan	T-Series; Colour Yellow Productions	Hindi	₹86.39 crore (US$11.66 million)	
8	Malang	T-Series; Luv Films; Northern Lights Entertainment	Hindi	₹84.5 crore (US$11.4 million)	
9	Shylock	Goodwill Entertainments	Malayalam	₹70 crore (US$9.45 million)	
10	Chhapaak	Fox Star Studios; Ka Productions; Mriga Films	Hindi	₹55.44 crore (US$7.48 million)	

== Lists of Indian films of 2020 ==
- List of Assamese films of 2020
- List of Bhojpuri films of 2020
- List of Gujarati films of 2020
- List of Hindi films of 2020
- List of Indian Bengali films of 2020
- List of Kannada films of 2020
- List of Malayalam films of 2020
- List of Marathi films of 2020
- List of Punjabi films of 2020
- List of Tamil films of 2020
- List of Telugu films of 2020
- List of Tulu films of 2020

== See also ==
- Punyakoti, Sanskrit-language film

Preceded by 2019	Indian films 2020	Succeeded by 2021
