= List of Indian films of 2016 =

Indian Films
- Previous: List of Indian films of 2015; Next: List of Indian films of 2017

This is the list of Indian films that have been released in 2016.

== Box office collection ==
The list of highest-grossing Indian films released in 2016, by worldwide box office gross revenue, are as follows:

| Rank | Film | Director | Language | Worldwide gross | Ref. |
|---|---|---|---|---|---|
| 1 | Dangal | Nitesh Tiwari | Hindi | ₹1,968 crore (equivalent to ₹31 billion or US$320 million in 2026)–₹2,500 crore (equivalent to ₹39 billion or US$410 million in 2026) | (Note: Bollywood Hungama reported that the collection was ₹1,968 crore, Box Office India reported that the collection was ₹2,024 crore. While The Hindustan Times mentioned that the film grossed more than ₹2,200 crore, Box Office Mojo mentioned it around ₹2,500 crore.) |
| 2 | Sultan | Ali Abbas Zafar | Hindi | ₹631.25 crore (equivalent to ₹990 crore or US$100 million in 2026) | |
| 3 | Kabali | Pa. Ranjith | Tamil | ₹286 crore (equivalent to ₹449 crore or US$47 million in 2026) | |
| 4 | Ae Dil Hai Mushkil | Karan Johar | Hindi | ₹239.67 crore (equivalent to ₹376 crore or US$39 million in 2026) | |
| 5 | Airlift | Raja Krishna Menon | Hindi | ₹231 crore (equivalent to ₹362 crore or US$38 million in 2026) | |
| 6 | Rustom | Tinu Suresh Desai | Hindi | ₹218.12 crore (equivalent to ₹342 crore or US$36 million in 2026) | |
| 7 | M.S. Dhoni: The Untold Story | Neeraj Pandey | Hindi | ₹215.48 crore (equivalent to ₹338 crore or US$35 million in 2026) | |
| 8 | Housefull 3 | Sajid-Farhad | Hindi | ₹195 crore (equivalent to ₹306 crore or US$32 million in 2026) | |
| 9 | Fan | Maneesh Sharma | Hindi | ₹182.33 crore (equivalent to ₹286 crore or US$30 million in 2026) | |
| 10 | Janatha Garage | Koratala Siva | Telugu | ₹150 crore (equivalent to ₹235 crore or US$24 million in 2026) | |
| 10 | Theri | Atlee | Tamil | ₹150 crore (equivalent to ₹235 crore or US$24 million in 2026) | |

== Lists of Indian films of 2016 ==
- List of Assamese films of 2016
- List of Gujarati films of 2016
- List of Hindi films of 2016
- List of Indian Bengali films of 2016
- List of Kannada films of 2016
- List of Malayalam films of 2016
- List of Marathi films of 2016
- List of Odia films of 2016
- List of Punjabi films of 2016
- List of Tamil films of 2016
- List of Telugu films of 2016
- List of Tulu films of 2016

== Notes ==
| Preceded by Indian films 2015 | Indian films 2016 | Succeeded by Indian films 2017 |
