= List of Indian films of 2015 =

This is the list of Indian films that have been released in 2015.

== Box office collection ==
The list of highest-grossing Indian films released in 2015, by worldwide box office gross revenue, are as follows:

Rank	Film	Director	Language	Worldwide gross	Ref.
1	Bajrangi Bhaijaan	Kabir Khan	Hindi	₹900 crore (equivalent to ₹14 billion or US$140 million in 2023)–₹969 crore (equivalent to ₹15 billion or US$150 million in 2023)	(Note: Bajrangi Bhaijaan's reported worldwide grosses vary between ₹900.90 crore (Firstpost) – ₹918.18 crore (Bollywood Hungama) – ₹969 crore (India Today))
2	Baahubali: The Beginning	S. S. Rajamouli	Telugu	₹600 crore (equivalent to ₹905 crore or US$94 million in 2023)–₹650 crore (equivalent to ₹981 crore or US$100 million in 2023)	(Note: Baahubali: The Beginning's reported worldwide grosses vary between ₹599.72 (Box Office India) – ₹600 crore (India Today and The Indian Express) – ₹650 (Firstpost))
3	Dilwale	Rohit Shetty	Hindi	₹372 crore (equivalent to ₹561 crore or US$58 million in 2023)–₹376 crore (equivalent to ₹567 crore or US$59 million in 2023)	(Note: Dilwale's reported worldwide grosses vary between ₹372.23 crore (Box Office India) – ₹376.85 crore (Bollywood Hungama))
4	Prem Ratan Dhan Payo	Sooraj R. Barjatya	Hindi	₹365 crore (equivalent to ₹551 crore or US$57 million in 2023)–₹388 crore (equivalent to ₹586 crore or US$61 million in 2023)	(Note: Prem Ratan Dhan Payo's reported worldwide grosses vary between ₹365.46 crore (Box Office India) – ₹388.48 crore (Bollywood Hungama))
5	Srimanthudu	Koratala Siva	Telugu	₹200 crore (equivalent to ₹302 crore or US$31 million in 2023)	
6	Welcome Back	Anees Bazmee	Hindi	₹167.37 crore (equivalent to ₹253 crore or US$26 million in 2023)	
7	Brothers	Karan Malhotra	Hindi	₹140.3 crore (equivalent to ₹212 crore or US$22 million in 2023)	
8	Kanchana 2	Raghava Lawrence	Tamil	₹108 crore (equivalent to ₹163 crore or US$17 million in 2023)–₹120 crore (equivalent to ₹181 crore or US$19 million in 2023)	(Note: Kanchana 2's reported worldwide grosses vary between ₹108 crore (Indian Express) – ₹120 crore (IBTimes))

== Lists of Indian films of 2015 ==
- List of Assamese films of 2015
- List of Gujarati films of 2015
- List of Hindi films of 2015
- List of Indian Bengali films of 2015
- List of Kannada films of 2015
- List of Malayalam films of 2015
- List of Marathi films of 2015
- List of Odia films of 2015
- List of Punjabi films of 2015
- List of Tamil films of 2015
- List of Telugu films of 2015
- List of Tulu films of 2015

== Notes ==
Preceded by Indian films 2014	Indian films 2015	Succeeded by Indian films 2016
