= 2.0 (film) =

2018 Indian film by Shankar

- Theatrical release poster
- Directed by: Shankar
- Screenplay by: Shankar
- Story by: Shankar
- Dialogues by: B. Jeyamohan; Madhan Karky
- Produced by: Allirajah Subaskaran
- Starring: Rajinikanth; Akshay Kumar; Amy Jackson
- Cinematography: Nirav Shah
- Edited by: Anthony
- Music by: A. R. Rahman
- Production company: Lyca Productions
- Distributed by: Lyca Productions; Dharma Productions; NVR Cinema LLP; AA Films
- Release date: 29 November 2018
- Running time: 147 minutes
- Country: India
- Language: Tamil
- Budget: est. ₹400–600 crore (Note: Budget estimates of 2.0 vary. Director S. Shankar said the budget stands between ₹400–450 crore while actor Rajnikanth stated it to be ₹600 crore. Bollywood Hungama revealed the overall budget as ₹400 crore. NDTV and WION reported the budget to be ₹500 crore. Whereas The Times of India and News 18, estimated it as ₹500–570 crore. Zee Business reported the budget to be ₹500–600 crore. The Indian Express estimated that the budget was more than ₹540 crore. Other estimates include ₹543 crore by The News Minute, Filmfare and Zee News; ₹550 crore by India Today and Business Today. International Business Times, DNA India, and Mashable India stated that the budget was ₹570 crore. GQ India, Cinema Express, The New Indian Express, and The Hindu mentioned the budget as ₹600 crore.)
- Box office: est. ₹699–800 crore (Note: 2.0's reported worldwide grosses vary between ₹699.89 crore (Box Office India) – ₹723 crore (Hindustan Times) – ₹800 crore (India Today))

2.0 is a 2018 Indian Tamil-language science fantasy action film. It was directed by Shankar, who co-wrote the film with B. Jeyamohan and Madhan Karky, and produced by Subaskaran under the banner of Lyca Productions. As the second instalment in the Enthiran film series, 2.0 is a sequel to Enthiran (2010), featuring Rajinikanth in a triple role as Vaseegaran, Chitti and Kutti, alongside Akshay Kumar as Pakshi Rajan (in his Tamil debut) and Amy Jackson. Sudhanshu Pandey, Adil Hussain, Kalabhavan Shajohn, and K. Ganesh appear in supporting roles. The film's soundtrack is composed by A. R. Rahman, with lyrics written by Madhan Karky and Na. Muthukumar. The film follows the conflict between Chitti, the once-dismantled humanoid robot, and Pakshi Rajan, a vengeful avian human, who seeks vengeance upon cell phone users to prevent the death of birds due to cellphone radiation.

Production began in 2015, with principal photography conducted at AVM Studios later that year. The first schedule was filmed at EVP World. Scenes were primarily shot in India, particularly in Chennai's Madras Boat Club and Delhi's Jawaharlal Nehru Stadium. Filming was completed by August 2017. The film is the first in Indian cinema to be natively shot in 3D, which was done by cinematographer Nirav Shah. Legacy Effects made their return to construct prosthetic makeup and animatronics, with visual effects supervised by V. Srinivas Mohan. Editing was handled by Anthony and production design was conducted by T. Muthuraj.

2.0 was released worldwide in both 3D and conventional format on 30 November 2018, along with its Hindi and Telugu dubbed versions. The film received mixed reviews from critics. It also faced scientific criticism, with the Audubon Society criticising the film for propagating misinformation regarding the impact of mobile phone towers on birds, and later published an article debunking this misinformation. Indian scientists and wildlife experts, too, called out the conspiracy theory, which forms the core idea of the film. 2.0 became the highest-grossing Indian film of 2018 and second highest-grossing Tamil film of all time. (Note: Hindustan Times reported a gross of 615.74 crore. Box Office India, and Times of India, reported the collections to be ₹655 crore. News 18 and The Indian Express mentioned the worldwide gross to be ₹723 crore. India Today, DNA India, and The Print reported the figures to be ₹800 crore.) It also ranks among highest-grossing Indian films. (Note: 2.0's reported worldwide grosses vary between ₹800.89 crore (Box Office India) – ₹810 crore (India Today)) 2.0 is the first Tamil film and the second Indian film, after Baahubali 2: The Conclusion, to gross over ₹100 crore on its opening day. 2.0 grossed over US$100 million worldwide, becoming the first Tamil film to achieve this feat.

2.0 was nominated for the Golden Reel Award in the Feature Film – Foreign sound editing category by the Motion Picture Sound Editors (MPSE) at their 66th annual ceremony.

== Plot ==
Eight years after the events of the first film, Dr. Vaseegaran introduces Nila, a sophisticated domestic humanoid android, to college students. He recalls Chitti, his previous creation, which he was legally forced to decommission after it went on a murderous rampage. Soon afterwards, mobile phones fly from people's hands across Chennai, causing widespread panic. An emergency council of political leaders and scientists convenes, and Vaseegaran advocates for reactivating Chitti to combat the threat. Council member Dhinendra Bohra opposes him because Chitti killed his father, Professor Bohra.

The phones merge into a gigantic swarm that murders prominent telecom executives and corrupt officials, prompting the state's Home Minister to authorise Chitti's reactivation. The upgraded Chitti battles the swarm, which takes the form of a giant bird, but retreats to a space research station when his battery runs low. The swarm is repelled by the high-frequency positive ions emitted by the station's antennas.

Vaseegaran and Chitti discover that the phones are bound by negatively charged aura energy with volatile electromagnetic properties. Using a high-powered photon synthesizer to produce positive ions, Chitti neutralises the swarm, causing it to collapse. The remaining phones assume the form of Pakshi Rajan, a deceased ornithologist. Chitti learns that Pakshi was a passionate avian conservationist who ran a bird sanctuary and opposed the proliferation of cellular networks. He had demonstrated that electromagnetic radiation from cell towers was killing birds, but telecom corporations and corrupt politicians suppressed his research. Despairing over the deaths, Pakshi hanged himself from a cell phone tower. His spirit subsequently merged with the collective life force of dead birds, becoming an entity able to manipulate mobile phones telekinetically.

Pakshi rejects Chitti's appeals for peace and seeks to eradicate humanity. Chitti contains his negative aura within an electromagnetic circuit, after which the government commissions Vaseegaran to mass-produce defensive androids. However, Dhinendra releases Pakshi, who possesses Vaseegaran and resumes his attack. Chitti refuses to kill his creator and is dismantled by Pakshi. Following Vaseegaran's encrypted instructions, Nila recovers Chitti and the "red chip" responsible for his original rampage. She reprogrammes it to target only Pakshi, which activates Chitti "2.0", his ruthless combat form.

Pakshi traps thousands of people in a stadium and kills Dhinendra with concentrated radiation from cell towers. Chitti and his robot army fight him but are overwhelmed. Before Pakshi can kill the hostages, Chitti deploys Kutti "3.0", a legion of micro-sized cellular androids that attach themselves to Pakshi's phone-based structures and self-destruct, allowing the hostages to escape.

Chitti and the remaining robots lure Pakshi's aura to the space station, where positive ions from the antennas destroy him. Vaseegaran recovers in a hospital and urges stricter regulation of cellular radiation. Chitti, Nila and the other robots are reinstated as guardians of public safety and enter government service. In a post-credits scene, Vaseegaran's smartphone transforms into a sentient Kutti microbot and jokingly declares itself as his grandson.

== Cast ==
- Rajinikanth in a triple role as
  - Dr. Vaseegaran
  - Chitti
  - Kutty
- Akshay Kumar as Pakshi Rajan
- Amy Jackson as Nila
- Adil Hussain as Home Minister S. Vijay Kumar
- Sudhanshu Pandey as Dhinendra "Dhina" Bohra
- Kalabhavan Shajohn as R. S. Vaira Moorthy, Minister of Telecommunications
- Mayilsamy as Balu, Vaira Moorthy's PA
- Ishari K. Ganesh as Jayanth Kumar
- Kaizaad Kotwal as Manoj Lulla
- Anant Mahadevan as the meeting head
- Michael Muthu as a police officer
- Avijit Dutt as Dr. Sam

Uncredited

- Sanchana Natarajan as a student
- Maya S. Krishnan as a student
- Priya Prince as Pakshi Rajan's mother
- Mayur Bansiwal as Pakshi Rajan's father
- Mathew Varghese as a doctor
- Murali Satagopan as a student
- Savitha Reddy as Sana Vaseegaran (Note: Originally portrayed by Aishwarya Rai, voice cameo)

== Production ==
=== Development ===
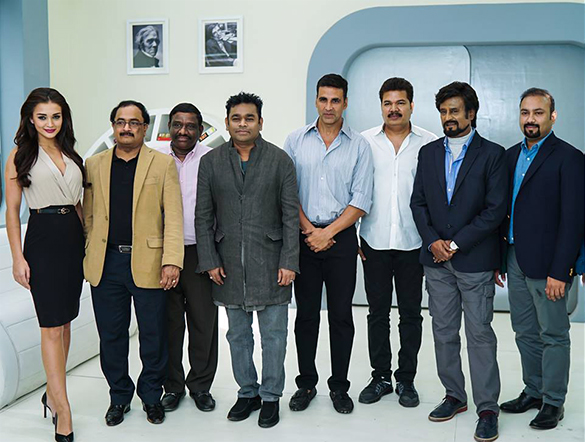
2.0's cast and crew including actors Rajinikanth, Akshay Kumar, Amy Jackson, director S. Shankar, producer Allirajah Subaskaran and music director A. R. Rahman.

The commercial success of Enthiran (2010) prompted the makers of the film to immediately consider making a sequel. By March 2011, the original film's cinematographer, Rathnavelu, revealed that initial pre-production work on a sequel had begun with the same technical team. S. Shankar, the director of Enthiran, moved on to work on Nanban (2012) and I (2015) and planned to reunite with the same producers as the original was released, with Shankar revealing that he was unsure if the film "will happen at all" during an interview in 2014. While finishing the production of I, Shankar drafted the scripts of three more feature films, including a sequel to Enthiran.

Pre-production work for the film had reportedly started in June 2015 with Lyca Productions deciding to finance the project. Along with Shankar and Rajinikanth, composer A. R. Rahman and editor Anthony remained on the development team for the sequel, while Jeyamohan was added to write the screenplay. Shankar also began briefing the film's art director T. Muthuraj and visual effects supervisor V. Srinivas Mohan about their involvement in the film. Shankar had initially inquired about K. V. Anand's availability. This was before Nirav Shah joined the technical team as a cinematographer in mid-2015 and visited specialist studios in the United States to research filming methods for 3D shoots.

Jeyamohan finished work on the script of the film in September 2015 and revealed that the story would be a direct continuation of the 2010 film, with filming only set to start following the completion of Rajinikanth's commitments in Kabali (2016). The original film's screenplay writer, Madhan Karky, helped Jeyamohan on some of the more technical dialogues in the script. While the film does include characters and references to events from its predecessor, it is primarily a standalone sequel. Unadjusted for inflation, 2.0 was the most expensive Indian film at the time of its release.

=== Casting ===
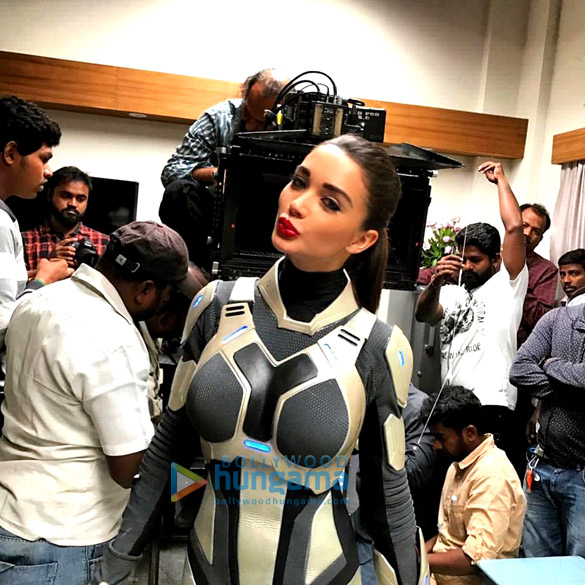
Amy Jackson plays Nila, a female humanoid robot.

Shankar held initial discussions with Kamal Haasan, Aamir Khan, and then Vikram about portraying a further role, though none of the three actors signed on to appear in the film. Subsequently, the team held talks with Hollywood actor Arnold Schwarzenegger for the role, who agreed to work on the film for a record remuneration. The makers however opted against signing Schwarzenegger due to contract issues. In late November 2015, Rajinikanth also travelled to Los Angeles to meet the film's producers and complete costume trials and initial motion capture effects work for the film. After further negotiations with actors including Hrithik Roshan and Neil Nitin Mukesh, the makers signed on Akshay Kumar to portray the role for which Schwarzenegger was initially considered.

In September 2016, Malayalam actor Kalabhavan Shajohn confirmed that he had tried out for a role in the film after Shankar was impressed with his performance in Drishyam (2013) and had signed him on.

=== Filming ===
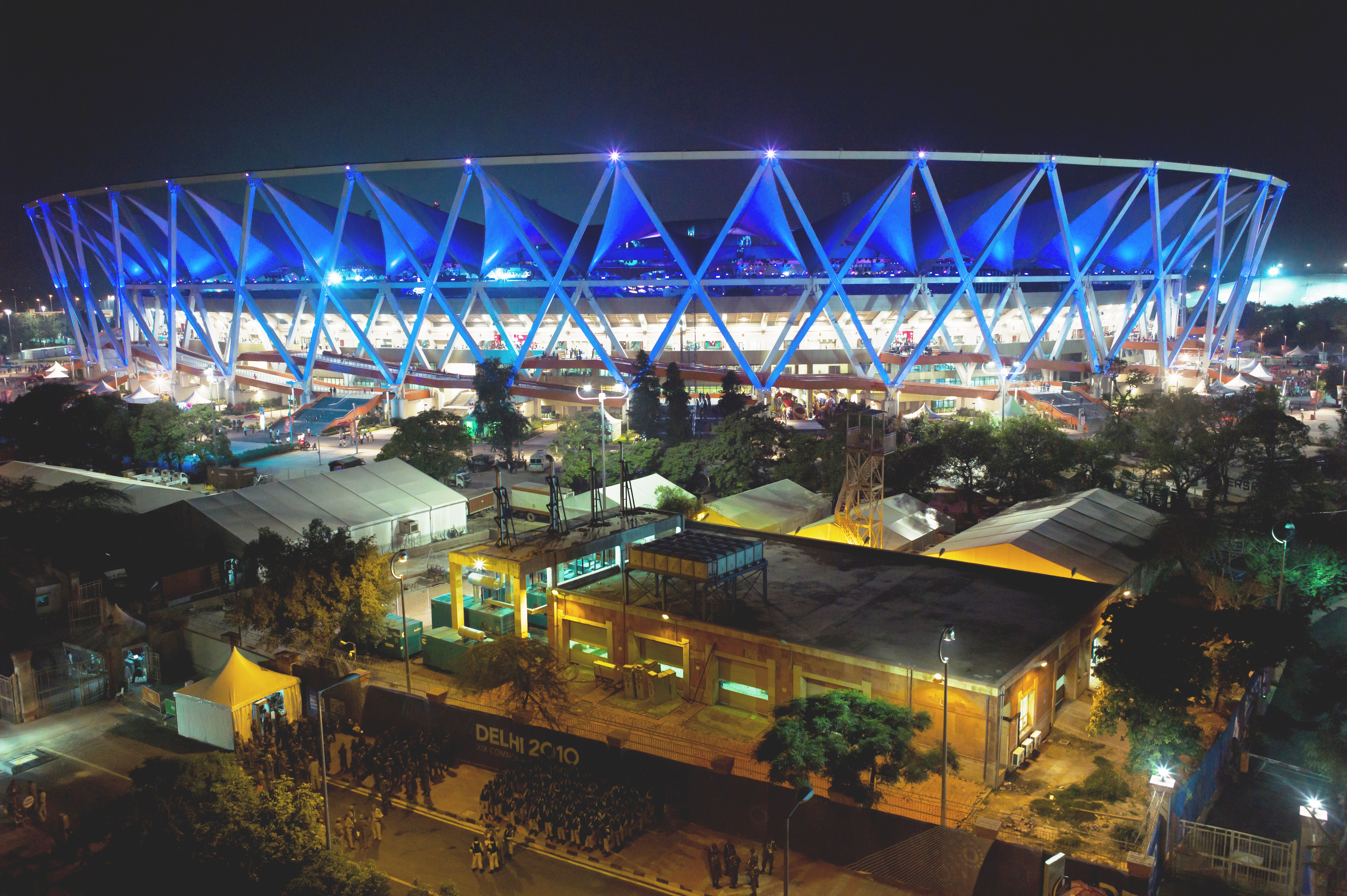
The Jawaharlal Nehru Stadium in New Delhi, where a battle scene during a football tournament was filmed.

An official launch event was to be held on 12 December 2015, coinciding with Rajinikanth's birthday. However, the team chose to avoid publicity as a result of the 2015 South India floods. On the first day of the shoot, a scene featuring Rajinikanth and several dwarf actors was shot at the erected set, while the team's principal cast and crew also assembled for a photoshoot.

Akshay began shooting for the film in Chennai at the beginning of March 2016 and took part in a schedule held at the EVP Film City studio in Chennai. A set of a mobile phone store was built on-site, while night scenes involving robotic equipment and military tanks were also canned. The team subsequently moved to Delhi in order to hold a forty-five-day schedule, continuing on from the same scenes with military tanks that were shot in Chennai. Subsequently, the team filmed sequences at Jawaharlal Nehru Stadium depicting an Indian Super League match between Chennaiyin FC and Mumbai City FC, with hundreds of extras recruited to act as supporters. Actors Amitabh Bachchan and Abhishek Bachchan visited the film's set at the stadium with the media reporting that the pair were set to make cameo appearances, though the claim was later denied by the team. Rajinikanth then joined the team in Delhi at the end of March to continue shooting for the project, with the climax sequences being filmed. Action scenes incorporating robotic equipment were filmed throughout early April in Delhi, with cinematographer Nirav Shah using helicams to capture sequences involving the three lead actors.

During the shoot at the studios, the visual effects designer Srinivas Mohan digitally converted a green screen sequence into locations including the Red Fort and the Parliament from Delhi after the team were unable to secure shooting permission there. By June 2016, Shankar revealed that after one hundred days of shooting, scenes including the climax and two major action sequences had been completed and that the film was fifty percent complete. Adil Hussain and Kalabhavan Shajohn began their work in the film during July 2016 in Chennai, while the rest of the cast were given an extended break after Rajinikanth fell ill. Following his illness and subsequent recovery, Rajinikanth returned to the sets of the film in early October after a break of close to four months. He shot for scenes alongside Amy Jackson in Chennai, where he was featured fighting huge birds created using animatronic technology with actor Riyaz Khan also joining the cast, but eventually he was not included in the final cast of the film. Soon after the schedule finished in early October, Shankar revealed that the film was two-thirds complete, following one hundred and fifty days of shooting.

Another schedule began in early November at EVP Film City in Chennai with all of the lead cast and continued throughout the month. All filming was completed except for one song that featured a set erected in Chennai. Jackson was given ten days of practice by choreographer Bosco. Filming was completed in August 2017. Principal photography was concluded on 22 October 2017.

== Music ==
A. R. Rahman composed the film's soundtrack and score, during the pre-production works of the film, in December 2015. Recording of the songs took place for nearly four years. In an interview with Archana Chandhok on Zee Tamil, Rajinikanth revealed that director Shankar wanted to make 2.0 without any songs. However, Rahman was still not convinced and felt that an album should have a minimum of four songs to provide listeners with a wholesome experience.

A promotional music event for the film was held at Burj Al Arab, Dubai on 27 October 2017, in a grand manner. And on the same day, two tracks from the film, "Endhira Logathu Sundhariye" and "Rajaali" were released, in Tamil and dubbed versions in Telugu and Hindi Madhan Karky and Na. Muthukumar provided the lyrics for the songs in Tamil. The third track, "Pullinangal" was included in the part of the soundtrack album on 6 November 2018.

The film score was released on 29 June 2019. Recording of the original score began in London and Rahman's Los Angeles studios in 2016. Unlike previous projects, Rahman began finalising the original background score six months back prior to release because he felt that the scenes were very heavy and it needed a lot of work.

== Scientific accuracy ==
The film's premise of sparrows (and other birds) dying because of electromagnetic radiation from mobile phone towers, is a popular urban legend in India, which can be easily debunked by the fact that sparrows thrive in old parts of big cities with lots of nesting spaces and crevices, despite the high mobile phone tower concentration in those areas. Asad Rahmani, who headed the Indian parliamentary panel to study the impact of communication towers on wildlife including birds and bees, called out the film, stating that "[t]here is no scientific proof between electromagnetic radiation and absence of sparrows". Steve Rousseau, writing for the Audubon Society, noted the impact of this film in spreading the falsehood linking radio waves and bird population decline. He mentioned that this film drove traffic to YouTube channels dedicated to conspiracy theories, which were actively spreading this pseudo-scientific theory.

Writing for Film Companion, AM Aravind said that in addition to the core idea of the film being based on pseudoscience, many of the facts and representations in the film, are inaccurate. The Arctic tern is mentioned by Pakshi Rajan as a regular visitor to the Vedanthangal Bird Sanctuary in India, which Aravind called inaccurate as the bird does not visit India. Furthermore, Pakshi Rajan claims that the jacobin cuckoo brings monsoon rains to India, and if the species does not migrate, the monsoon's impacts are reduced for that year in India. Aravind notes that while the bird's migration to North India happens before the monsoon, the birds can not impact the monsoon. He also criticised the scene where Pakshi Rajan inaccurately mentions "jacobin cuckoo" as the bird's scientific name when it is in fact a common name. Aravind noted that common Indian birds that should be present in Pakshi Rajan's backyard are missing, and the birds seen are instead exotic birds such as toucans, macaws and cranes, kept in cages. He felt that Pakshi Rajan, through his speeches and actions, seems like a bird trafficker or charlatan rather than an ornithologist.

== Marketing and release ==
In November 2016, it was revealed that 2.0 was scheduled for release during Diwali on 18 October 2017. In April 2017, Raju Mahalingam, the film's former producer, announced that the film's release had been postponed to 25 January 2018 citing better incorporation of visual effects. The release date was later moved to 14 April 2018. The release date was once again moved to 27 April 2018, but Kaala ended up releasing on that date instead, resulting in another delay of the film. The making video of the film was revealed on 25 August 2017. The film, which contains approximately 1,000 visual effects shots according to producers, was delayed numerous times while the computer-generated imagery (CGI) work was being completed by numerous effects studios. The film was finally slated to be released in cinemas on 29 November 2018.

The teaser of 2.0 was released on Ganesh Chaturti, 13 September 2018, in both 3D and 2D. Its 2D teaser video was viewed over 32 million times in 24 hours, but did not mention the film's release date. Deccan Herald speculated that this was possibly due to "a lot of VFX work left in the film" and that Lyca Productions released the teaser "so that they can keep the audiences busy." In addition to its original language, the film was released in 14 other languages with dubbed versions. The film earned ₹370 crore (US$54.1 million) from satellite, digital and music rights. This includes, but is not limited to, about ₹110 crore (US$16.08 million) for satellite rights to Zee Tamil and ₹50 crore (US$7.31 million) for digital rights, the latter sold to Amazon Prime Video. The film was also one of the top searched queries on Google Trends for a week. As a result, Google India released an animated tribute celebrating the film's massive search popularity.

Ahead of the film's release, the Cellular Operators Association of India (COAI) lodged a complaint, demanding that the Central Board of Film Certification (CBFC) certificate of the film be revoked for "promoting anti-scientific attitudes towards mobile phones and cellular networks". The organisation alleged the producers "falsely [depict] mobile phones and mobile towers as harmful to living creatures and the environment including birds and human beings". Meanwhile, a Lyca Productions spokesperson stated that "[w]e are under no obligation to toe the line and the film does not hunt or defames [sic] anyone."

In China, the film released on 6 September 2019. It was said to be released by HY Media in 10,000 theatres with 56,000 screenings, which includes 47,000 3D screenings, which is the largest release ever for an Indian film in the country in May 2019, with a Mandarin dub and subtitles, but the release was delayed to 6 September 2019 and released in about 48,000 screens. A dubbed Russian-language version of the film will also release in Russia on 25 July 2019.

An action mobile video game, Chhota Rajini Robot 2.0 Game, was released as a tie-in for the film by Mobi2Fun.

== Reception ==
=== Critical response ===
On the review aggregator website Rotten Tomatoes, 55% of 20 critics' reviews are positive, with an average rating of 5.5/10.

==== India ====
2.0 received mixed reviews from critics in India. Taran Adarsh gave the film five stars out of five and applauded Shankar as "a visionary... He hits the ball out of the park this time. Akshay Kumar is fantastic, while Rajinikanth is the boss". A critic for Bollywood Hungama gave it four and a half stars out of five and similarly commended Shankar, stating that "[his] direction is highly effective and he proves once again why he's one of our best filmmakers. He doesn't get overwhelmed by the technology available and makes correct use of it". S Subhakeerthana of The Indian Express gave it four stars out of five: "Shankar has raised the bar in filmmaking in terms of visualisation, grandeur, and every frame of his fascinates you as a viewer". Business Today's Ramesh Bala gave it four stars out of five, and found Kumar to be the film's spotlight: "He has rocked both as Birdman and as a normal man in an emotional flashback".

Writing for Hindustan Times, Raja Sen rated 2.0 three and a half stars out of five, terming Rajinikanth as "smarter than a smartphone" and counted him and Kumar among the film's strengths. A critic for the Indo-Asian News Service also gave three and a half stars out of five and wrote, "Unlike most science-fiction films, 2.0 takes the commercial route to entertain, thus does come across as illogical at places, but that's what makes it insanely fun". Devesh Sharma of Filmfare also gave three and a half stars out of five. M. Suganth of The Times of India gave it three stars out of five; he stated that there is a sense of "just going through the motions in the first half," but found that the action sequences and chemistry between the leads helped keep the film enjoyable for most of its run-time. Writing for Film Companion, Anupama Chopra also gave the film three stars out of five: "2.0 is visually overpowering – the VFX are mostly first-rate – but the screenplay doesn't offer the seamless mix of romance, drama and comedy [as the predecessor]".

Janani K, film critic for India Today, gave 2.0 three stars out of five and appreciated the film's theme, but felt it could be better presented, writing, "Though it is a much-need [sic] message, it could have been explained in an intriguing manner rather than the pedantic treatment it gets". Rajeev Masand also gave it three stars out of five. Shubhra Gupta of The Indian Express gave the film two stars out of five, describing it as "dull as ditchwater in the first half, perking up a little in the second, with a half-way watchable Akshay Kumar, and a Rajinikanth coming into his own right towards the end, for a bit". Pragati Saxena of National Herald concurred with Gupta and criticised the pace and dullness of the film. Writing for News18, Rohit Vats also rated two stars out of five and criticised the writing, opining, "[Shankar's] characters haven't evolved the way the world around them has". Saibal Chatterjee of NDTV also gave two stars out of five and said, "Bunkum is bunkum no matter how big the bucks behind it are". Ananda Vikatan rated the film 47 out of 100.

==== Overseas ====
Simon Abrahams of RogerEbert.com gave the film three and a half stars out of four and stated, "Against all reason–against all common sense–2.0 works, and in a big, big way". Shilpa Jamkhandikar of Reuters wrote, "This film certainly has the look and feel of a big-ticket Hollywood production, and that alone is worth the price of the ticket". Kumar Shyam of The National gave it three and a half stars out of five and wrote, "2.0 is a very clever spectacle not to be missed for its sheer audacity and scale". Rafael Motamayor of Polygon wrote, "2.0's biggest draw is its impressive use of visual effects, and the film doesn't waste a moment to showcase its budget". He felt "[t]he effects [were] detailed enough to stand against a $200 million-dollar American blockbuster".

=== Box office ===
2.0 was released in about 6900 screens in India and over 2000 screens overseas. On its opening day, 2.0 earned about ₹80 crore (US$11.7 million) gross collection in India (all versions), which was the second highest ever for an Indian film after Baahubali 2: The Conclusion (2017)'s ₹154 crore (US$23.65 million). This was around ₹64 crore nett. Its worldwide gross was over ₹100 crore (US$14.62 million), which was also the second highest worldwide collection for an Indian film on its first day after Baahubali 2. On its second day, the film went on to be number one at the Australian box office. In Malaysia, the film had an all-time highest opening for any Tamil film at that time. On its second day, the film earned around ₹45 crore in India. The all-India business of 2.0 increased to ₹56–57 crore nett on Saturday (the third day) owing to positive word-of-mouth in North India, while the collections in South India saw a minor drop. Its all-India total increased to ₹165.5 crore nett. On its third day, the film earned around ₹290 crore (US$42.4 million) worldwide in all languages, including ₹85 crore (US$12.43 million) from overseas markets.

At the American box office, the film surpassed the total gross of Rajinikanth's previous film Lingaa (2014) in just two days. The film debuted at number 11 at the American box office, earning $4.09 million. The screen count was increased from 20 to 75 in Pakistan on its second day to meet the demand. 2.0 grossed US$14.75 million (₹1.03 billion) in first five days in overseas markets. On its fourth day, a Sunday, business picked up over India, which led the film to accumulate an opening weekend collection of around ₹400 crore (US$58.49 million), the highest amount earned by any film in the week of 29 November to 2 December, ahead of Fantastic Beasts: The Crimes of Grindelwald (2018). Collections in India, discounting overseas, were ₹291 crore (US$42.55 million) gross (₹229 crore nett) in all languages. This pushed it ahead of Enthiran, which was the previous highest-grossing film from Tamil cinema with an earning of ₹205 crore nett in India. (Note: While the Telugu-Tamil bilinguals Baahubali: The Beginning (2015) and Baahubali 2: The Conclusion (2017) crossed Enthiran's earnings, they were produced in Telugu cinema.) In its four-day opening weekend, the film opened at number one at the United Arab Emirates box office, earning $2.5 million, ahead of Creed II (2018).

On its fifth day, the film earned around ₹451 crore (US$56 million) worldwide in all languages, including ₹114 crore (US$16 million) from international markets. In North India, its Hindi version earned around ₹111 crore (US$16 million). Along with the sixth day business of ₹24 crore nett, the film earned ₹282.31 crore nett in India. It did record business in the southern Indian states of Tamil Nadu and Kerala. By the end of seven days, the film earned ₹480 crore (US$70.19 million) worldwide, which included ₹362 crore (US$52.93 million) in India and US$15 million (₹1.18 billion) in overseas markets. The extended first week worldwide collection was ₹520 crore (US$76.04 million). The film has grossed over ₹800 crore (US$116.98 million).

=== Home media ===
Zee News reported that 2.0 was Zee Tamil's highest-rated movie premiere ever, with a rating of 722 points.

== Accolades ==
Year	Award	Category	Recipient(s) and nominee(s)	Result	Ref.
2018	Ananda Vikatan Cinema Awards	Best Cinematographer	Nirav Shah	Won	
2018	Ananda Vikatan Cinema Awards	Best Makeup Artist	Banu; A. R. Abdul Razzaq; Legacy Effects	Won	
2018	Ananda Vikatan Cinema Awards	Best Animation and Visual Effects	V. Srinivas Mohan; Shankar	Won	
2018	Ananda Vikatan Cinema Awards	Talk of the Town	2.0	Won	
