= Enthiran (film series) =

Film series

Enthiran Duology
- Franchise logo
- Created by: S. Shankar
- Original work: Enthiran
- Owners: Sun Pictures; Lyca Productions

Films and television
- Film(s): Enthiran (2010); 2.0 (2018)

Audio
- Soundtrack(s): Enthiran; 2.0

Official website
- Production Website

Enthiran (transl. Robot) is an Indian Tamil-language science fiction film series directed, produced and written by S. Shankar. The music for the films was composed by A. R. Rahman. It consists of a two-part film series. The first film Enthiran was released on 1 October 2010 while the second one, 2.0, was released on 30 November 2018. Enthiran film series is the third highest-grossing Indian film franchise after K.G.F and Baahubali. Rajinikanth appears in the role of Dr. Vaseegaran and Chitti in both films.

== Overview ==
=== Enthiran (2010 film) ===
After a decade of research, the scientist K. Vaseegaran creates a sophisticated humanoid robot with the help of his assistants, Siva and Ravi, to commission it into the Indian Army. He introduces the robot, named Chitti, at a robotics conference in Chennai. Chitti helps Sana, Vaseegaran's medical student girlfriend, cheat in her examination, then saves her from being assaulted by a group of thugs in a local train. Vaseegaran's mentor, Professor Bohra, is secretly engaged in a project to create similar android robots for a German terrorist organisation, but his efforts were in vain. The organization gives Bohra an advanced payment. Bohra receives a warning from the terrorist organization, specifying a one-month timeframe during which he must complete the robots. Failure to do so will get him killed.

Vaseegaran prepares Chitti for an evaluation by the Artificial Intelligence Research and Development (AIRD) Institute, which is headed by Bohra. During the evaluation, Chitti attempts to stab Vaseegaran at Bohra's command, which convinces the evaluation committee that the robot is a liability and cannot be used for military purposes. Vaseegaran's effort to prove Bohra wrong fails when he deploys Chitti to rescue people from a burning building. The robot saves most of them, including a girl named Selvi who was bathing at the time, but she is ashamed at being seen naked on camera. Though Vaseegaran puts his coat around her, and the girl's mother tries to convince her to come back, the girl flees, only to be hit and killed by a truck. Vaseegaran asks for one month to modify Chitti's neural schema to enable it to understand human behaviour and emotions, to which Bohra agrees. While nearing the deadline, Chitti becomes angry with Vaseegaran, demonstrating to him that it can manifest emotions.

Chitti uses Sana's textbooks to successfully help Sana's sister Latha give birth to a child. Bohra congratulates Vaseegaran on the achievement and allows Chitti to pass the AIRD evaluation. Bohra then tells Vaseegaran that problems start from now on. Chitti develops romantic feelings for Sana after she congratulates Chitti by kissing it. When Vaseegaran and Sana realise this, Sana explains to Chitti that they are only friends. Saddened by Sana's rejection, yet still in love with her, Chitti purposely fails the evaluation conducted by the Indian Army the following day. Frustrated with Chitti's performance in the evaluation, Vaseegaran chops Chitti into pieces, which are dumped by Siva and Ravi into a landfill site.

Bohra visits the site to retrieve Chitti, which has now reassembled itself, albeit in a damaged state. Chitti asks Bohra to take him to Bohra's house, not knowing that the person who had been searching for him was Bohra himself. After this, Bohra embeds a red chip inside Chitti while reconstructing it with Siva and Ravi, converting it into version 2.0, which is more aggressive and ruthless. When Siva and Ravi ask Bohra why he is doing this to Chitti, Bohra tells them that he is doing this to earn money through his business and defame Vaseegaran, scaring Siva and Ravi. It then gatecrashes Vaseegaran and Sana's wedding, kidnaps Sana and fights off numerous policemen on the way who chase it. It then creates replicas of itself using Bohra's robots, and then kills Bohra after he attempts to kill Sana. Using its robot army, Chitti occupies AIRD and causes mayhem in the city. After informing Sana that it has acquired the human ability to reproduce, Chitti wishes to marry her so that a machine and a human being can give birth to a pre-programmed child, but Sana refuses. It eventually finds Vaseegaran, who entered AIRD to stop the chaos, and nearly kills him just before the police appear. The ensuing battle between Chitti's robot army and the police personnel leads to a lot of property destruction and many casualties. While fighting the police personnel and the army, Chitti and his robots attack in various formations like a sphere, a snake, a wall and a large human-like figure. Vaseegaran eventually captures Chitti using a magnetic wall and accesses its internal control panel, whereby he instructs all the other robots to self-destruct. He then removes Chitti's red chip, calming it down.

In a court hearing, Vaseegaran is sentenced to death for the casualties and damages caused by the robot army, but Chitti explains that it was Bohra who caused its deviant behaviour and shows the court video footage of Bohra installing the red chip. The court releases Vaseegaran, while ordering that Chitti be dismantled. Left with no choice, Vaseegaran asks Chitti to dismantle itself. While saying goodbye, Chitti apologises to Vaseegaran, Sana and their families who forgive it, before dismantling itself.

The film's setting then shifts to 2030. Chitti is now a museum exhibit. A curious school student on an excursion trip asks her guide why it was dismantled, to which Chitti responds, "Naan sinthikka arambichen" (I started thinking).

=== 2.0 (2018 film) ===
Dr. Vaseegaran has recently built a new android humanoid assistant named Nila, whom he introduces to a group of college students. Shortly after, all the mobile phones in the city begin to fly into the sky, throwing the public into a panic. A scientific council assembles to discuss the phenomenon, in which Vaseegaran suggests reactivating the robot Chitti. But the plan is opposed by a member of the council, Dhinendra Bohra, whose father was killed by Chitti a few years back.

The cell phones gather into a swarm and kill phone retail store owner Jayanth Kumar, telecom company owner Manoj Lula, and Telecom Minister Vaira Moorthy. The Home Minister S. Vijay Kumar gives permission for Vaseegaran to reactivate Chitti, whom he has already started working on. The cell phone swarm destroys phone towers around the city and wreaks havoc on the public, manifesting as a giant bird. A newly activated and upgraded Chitti battles the bird in the city and destroys it with an explosion. The remaining phones retreat and reform. Chitti, who runs out of battery takes refuge in three antennas at a space station. The bird tries to follow but is repelled by the antennas.

Chitti informs Vaseegaran about this incident and confirms that the phones are powered by an aura, specifically a concentrated mass of negative charge with electromagnetic properties. Since the space station was streaming positive charged ions into space, the bird was repelled. Vaseegaran builds a photon synthesizer that projects positive charge, intending to neutralise the charge of the bird. The group confronts the bird and drains it of power. The phones take up a humanoid form, as the deceased ornithologist Pakshi Rajan.

Chitti converses with Pakshi as he attempts to destroy the synthesizer, in which a flashback reveals that Pakshi protested against the usage of modern mobile phones, from which the radiation affected the brains of birds and caused mass deaths, especially near his bird sanctuary and home in Thirukazhukundram. Pakshi makes conferences and protests to address this, but the public dismisses and mocks him. Lula and Moorthy also reject his morals for their business and Jayanth Kumar shuns him from his shop as he tries to protest. Birds all over the city including Pakshi's sanctuary die out, including newborn chicks. A distraught and angered Pakshi, after even a court investigation found no violations (because telecom companies reduced signal levels to conceal wrongdoing), hangs himself at a cell tower. Pakshi's negatively charged spirit reawakens by the radiation emitting from the tower. By absorbing the souls of all the deceased birds in the city, he becomes a vengeful entity.

Chitti tries to convince Pakshi not to hurt the public but Pakshi wishes to punish their ignorance. Chitti has Pakshi captured and contained. The news spreads to the council which decides to build an army of such robots for the military. Dhinendra, who becomes angered by Chitti's victory, releases Pakshi's spirit from the synthesizer. Pakshi possesses Vaseegaran and attacks the public again, but Chitti refuses to attack his creator. Nila gets the red chip and reprograms Chitti to his evil 2.0 alter ego, after altering it to not harm the innocent and commanding him only to fight Pakshi.

Pakshi traps 80,000 people in a football stadium and kills Dhinendra, who was present, by focusing radiation from multiple cell towers. Chitti interferes and fights Pakshi's bird form with his army. As Chitti runs out of charge, Pakshi turns into his winged form and creates several bird drones. The drones tear the robots into pieces, but before Pakshi can summon radiation he's interrupted by one of Chitti's creations: the action figure bot Kutti 3.0. Released into the stadium by Nila, the Kutti bots mount themselves on doves, forcing Pakshi to stand down. The Kuttis self-destruct and destroy Pakshi's drones. After Vaseegaran is released from possession, Pakshi is led to the space station where he is destroyed.

Vaseegaran recovers in the hospital and tells Vijay Kumar, who comes to see him, that he feels Pakshi Rajan was a virtuous person who became a victim of the corrupt society. He also suggests we reduce and control cell phone radiation and ensure that technology do not threaten the lives of all the living creatures in the world. Chitti, now restored to its original version, begins a relationship with Nila.

In a post-credits scene, Sana asks Vaseegaran over the phone about the probability of mobile phones flying again. Immediately, Vaseegaran's mobile flies out of his hand and morphs into Kutti 3.0, saying, "I am your grandson".

== Films ==
Film	Release date	Director	Screenwriter(s)	Story by	Producer(s)	Installment(s)	Notes(s)
Enthiran	1 October 2010	S. Shankar	Sujatha, S. Shankar	S. Shankar	Kalanithi Maran	First Installment	Enthiran Duology
2.0	30 November 2018	S. Shankar	Madhan Karky	S. Shankar, B. Jeyamohan, Madhan Karky	A. Subaskaran	Second and Final Installment	Enthiran Duology

Two films of Enthiran Duology take place between 2010 and 2018.

=== Enthiran (2010 film) ===
The first installment of the series, centers on the fictional incidents. Vaseegaran, a brilliant scientist, builds Chitti, a unique robot, who is programmed to protect mankind and also feel human emotions. Problems arise when Chitti falls in love with his girlfriend. Enthiran was released on 1 October 2010 (worldwide) and gained positive reviews. It earned ₹290 crore worldwide against a budget of ₹132 crore, becoming one of the highest-grossing film in Indian history (2010).

=== 2.0 (2018 film) ===
After the success of Enthiran Shankar and Rajinikanth Re-unite once again for a sequel. The film was titled as 2.0 and it's a Standalone sequel to the previous one. And also second and final installment in this series. The plot focused on when mobile phones start flying from people's hands, Dr. Vaseegaran and his robot Nila are asked to help. However, due to Pakshi Rajan having a hand in this, the two have to reinstate Chitti to defeat him. 2.0 was released worldwide in both 3D and conventional format on 29 November 2018, along with its dubbed versions in Hindi and Telugu. It received mostly positive reviews upon release. Critics particularly praised the film's visual effects, performances of Rajinikanth and Akshay Kumar It earned ₹117.34 crore (US$16 million) worldwide on its first day, which was the second-highest ever for an Indian film. The film crossed ₹520 crore (equivalent to ₹591 crore or US$78 million in 2020) in its opening weekend to be the highest-grossing film worldwide for that week. Total collection of the film is ₹800 crore. 2.0 is the sixteenth highest-grossing Indian film and is ninth highest grossing indian franchise.

== Recurring cast and characters ==
This table lists the main characters who appear in the Enthiran Franchise.

List indicators

This section includes characters who will appear or have appeared in Enthiran film series.

- An empty grey cell indicates the character was not in the film, or that the character's official presence has not yet been confirmed.
- ^{A} indicates an appearance through archival footage or audio.
- ^{C} indicates a cameo role.
- ^{V} indicates a voice-only role.
- ^{Y} indicates a younger version of the character.

Characters	Films	
Characters	Enthiran	2.0
Characters	2010	2018
Dr. Vaseegaran	Rajinikanth	Rajinikanth
Chitti	Rajinikanth	Rajinikanth
Kutti		Rajinikanth^{C}
Sana Vaseegaran	Aishwarya Rai	Savitha Reddy^{V}
Professor Bohra	Danny Denzongpa	Danny Denzongpa^{A}
Siva	Santhanam	
Ravi	Karunas	
Latha	Devadarshini	
Shah	Sabu Cyril	
Pakshi Rajan		Akshay Kumar
Nila		Amy Jackson
Dhinendra "Dhina" Bohra		Sudhanshu Pandey
Minister S. Vijay Kumar		Adil Hussain
Jayanth Kumar		Ishari K. Ganesh
Vaira Moorthy		Kalabhavan Shajohn

== Additional crew and production details ==
Occupation	Film	
Occupation	Enthiran (2010)	2.0 (2018)
Director	S. Shankar	S. Shankar
Screenplay	S. Shankar	S. Shankar
Story	S. Shankar	S. Shankar
Producer(s)	Kalanithi Maran	A. Subaskaran
Presenter(s)	Kalanithi Maran	Karan Johar
Dialogue Writer(s)	S. Shankar; Sujatha; Madhan Karky	S. Shankar; B. Jeyamohan; Madhan Karky
Music director(s)	A. R. Rahman	A. R. Rahman
Cinematography	R. Rathnavelu	Nirav Shah
Editor(s)	Anthony	Anthony
Visual Effects Supervisor(s)	V. Srinivas Mohan	V. Srinivas Mohan
Production Design(s)	Sabu Cyril	T. Muthuraj
Sound Designer(s)	Resul Pookutty	Resul Pookutty
Production Company	Sun Pictures	Lyca Productions
Distributor(s)	Sun Pictures	Lyca Productions; Dharma Productions; AA Films
Runtime	2h 57min	2h 27min

== Release and reception ==
=== Box office ===
Film	Release date	Budget	Box office
Enthiran	1 October 2010	₹132 crore (US$28.87 million)–₹150 crore (US$32.8 million) (Note: The Economic Times claims the film's budget to be ₹1.32 billion, whereas Anirban Bhattacharya of CNN Travel and T. S. Sreenivasan Raghavan of Bangalore Mirror state that it is ₹1.62 billion.)	₹283 crore (US$61.89 million)–₹320 crore (US$69.98 million)
2.0	29 November 2018	₹400 crore (US$58.49 million)–₹600 crore (US$87.73 million)	₹666 crore (US$97.38 million)–₹800 crore (US$116.98 million)
Total		₹532 crore (US$55 million)–₹750 crore (US$78 million)	₹949 crore (US$99 million)–₹1,120 crore (US$120 million)

Note: The budget and box office collection in US$ is the average as there is many figures about the budget and box office collection according to many reports.

=== Critical reception ===
Film	Rotten Tomatoes
Enthiran	77% (6/10 average rating) (13 reviews)
2.0	55% (5.5/10 average rating) (20 reviews)

The first film received positive reviews while the second film received mixed reviews, with praise for their direction, storyline, visual effects, music, action sequences, cinematography and cast performances (especially Rajinikanth).
