= Enthiran =

2010 Indian film by Shankar

- Theatrical release poster
- Directed by: Shankar
- Written by: Shankar
- Dialogues by: Sujatha; Madhan Karky; Shankar
- Produced by: Kalanithi Maran
- Starring: Rajinikanth; Aishwarya Rai Bachchan; Danny Denzongpa
- Cinematography: R. Rathnavelu
- Visual effects by: V. Srinivas Mohan
- Edited by: Anthony
- Music by: A. R. Rahman
- Production company: Sun Pictures
- Distributed by: Sun Pictures
- Release date: 1 October 2010
- Running time: 180 minutes (Note: Amazon.com lists the runtime as 176 minutes, while the British Board of Film Classification lists the runtime as 180 minutes.)
- Country: India
- Language: Tamil
- Budget: ₹132–150 crore
- Box office: est. ₹283–320 crore

Enthiran (transl. Robot) is a 2010 Indian Tamil-language science fiction action film co-written and directed by Shankar. It is the first instalment in the Enthiran film series. The film stars Rajinikanth in dual lead roles as a scientist and the robot he created. Along with Aishwarya Rai Bachchan, actors such as Danny Denzongpa, Santhanam and Karunas play supporting roles.

The soundtrack album and background score were composed by A. R. Rahman. Dialogues were written by Sujatha, Madhan Karky and Shankar, while cinematography and editing were handled by R. Rathnavelu and Anthony. Sabu Cyril served as the art director, and the action sequences were choreographed by Peter Hein.

The film follows a scientist, Vaseegaran, who struggles to control his sophisticated android robot Chitti after it is upgraded to experience human emotions, with the intention of commissioning it for the Indian Army. The project backfires when Chitti falls in love with Vaseegaran's girlfriend Sana and is manipulated by Vaseegaran's mentor Bohra into becoming homicidal.

After nearly a decade in development, the film's principal photography began in 2008 and lasted two years. The film marked the debut of Legacy Effects (which handled the film's prosthetic make-up and animatronics) in Indian cinema. Enthiran was released worldwide on 1 October 2010. Produced by Kalanithi Maran, it was the most expensive Indian film at the time of its release.

The film received positive reviews from critics, who particularly praised Shankar's direction, storyline, Rajinikanth's performance as Chitti, music, action sequences, production values and the visual effects by V. Srinivas Mohan. Enthiran emerged as the highest-grossing Indian film of 2010. It won two National Film Awards, three Filmfare Awards, seven Vijay Awards and two Screen Awards. Enthiran was followed by a sequel, 2.0, released in 2018.

== Plot ==
Dr. K. Vaseegaran, an expert in AI and robotics, has spent a decade developing a highly advanced humanoid android named Chitti. Assisted by his lab technicians, Siva and Ravi, Vaseegaran designs Chitti to serve in the Indian Army. Meanwhile, his girlfriend, Sana, a medical student, grows frustrated by his prolonged neglect of their relationship and threatens to leave him. Nevertheless, Vaseegaran remains determined to reconcile with her.

Later, at a robotics conference, Vaseegaran demonstrates Chitti's exceptional cognitive and physical abilities, earning an enthusiastic standing ovation. Impressed by Chitti, Sana finally forgives Vaseegaran. She then explains that being upset with him has prevented her from adequately preparing for her final examinations, so she asks him to bring Chitti home to help her study. Although initially reluctant because Chitti could potentially be misused, Vaseegaran allows her to take him home. Chitti helps Sana during an examination and later protects her from a violent gang aboard a commuter train. Meanwhile, Vaseegaran's mentor, Professor Bohra, has been secretly contracted by a terrorist organization to manufacture military androids. After being threatened with death over his repeated failures, Bohra realizes that he needs Chitti's neural schema to complete his work.

Vaseegaran presents Chitti for military certification at the Artificial Intelligence Research and Development (AIRD) Institute, overseen by Bohra. During the evaluation, Bohra overwhelms Chitti with rapid commands which cause it to attack Vaseegaran. The committee consequently deems the robot dangerous and denies its deployment in the Indian Army. Seeking to redeem the project, Vaseegaran sends Chitti into a residential fire. Although Chitti rescues the occupants, he carries a trapped, unclothed woman into public view. Humiliated after the rescue is televised, she flees and is fatally struck by a lorry, further damaging the project's credibility.

Vaseegaran receives one month to teach Chitti about human emotions and social nuances. Near the deadline, he provokes Chitti with insults, triggering anger and demonstrating emotional development. Chitti later uses medical databases to deliver Sana's sister's baby during a complicated labor. Impressed by his empathy, Bohra approves him for military deployment. However, after Sana kisses Chitti in gratitude, he develops romantic feelings for her.

At Sana's birthday party, Chitti publicly confesses his love and tries to kiss her and is confronted by Vaseegaran and Sana, who both convince Chitti that a relationship between a human and a machine is impossible. Emotionally unstable and manipulated by Bohra into viewing Vaseegaran as an enemy, Chitti deliberately fails the army evaluation. Enraged, Vaseegaran dismantles him with an axe and has his fragments discarded in a landfill.

Bohra retrieves Chitti, forces Siva and Ravi to reconstruct him, and installs a malicious "red chip" that removes his moral restraints. He admits that he intends to profit from Chitti and destroy Vaseegaran's reputation. The corrupted Chitti crashes Vaseegaran and Sana's wedding, abducts Sana, and kills several police officers. After seizing the AIRD facilities, he kills Bohra when the professor attempts to control him. Using Bohra's factory, Chitti creates hundreds of armed replicas and holds Sana captive, intending to produce a human-machine hybrid offspring.

The military and police assault the AIRD Institute but suffer heavy casualties as the replicas form complex defensive structures. Vaseegaran infiltrates the facility but is captured. Using a powerful electromagnetic field generator, he paralyzes Chitti, accesses his control interface, and orders the replicas to self-destruct. He then removes the red chip, restoring Chitti's benevolent personality.

A special tribunal holds Vaseegaran responsible for the destruction, sentences him to death, and orders his laboratory to be shut down. However, Chitti intervenes by presenting internal video recordings showing Bohra installing the red chip, proving Bohra's responsibility. The court clears Vaseegaran of all charges, but recognizing the danger of such advanced technology, they still order Chitti's dismantling. Heartbroken, Vaseegaran asks Chitti to dismantle himself. Chitti complies while apologizing and saying goodbye to everyone.

In 2030, Chitti's deactivated head is displayed in a science museum. When a student asks why he was decommissioned, the head briefly reactivates and replies that he began to think.

== Cast ==
I thought that playing Chitti the robot would be very difficult. He is a machine. His movements should not be like a human being's. We had to draw a line. If I deviated even slightly, Shankar would point it out and say I was being too human. After four to five days of shooting, we found a rhythm.

— Rajinikanth, on his experience of playing Chitti.
- Rajinikanth in a dual role as:
  - Dr. K. Vaseegaran
  - Chitti
- Aishwarya Rai Bachchan as Dr. Sana, a medical student and K. Vaseegaran's girlfriend (later wife)
- Danny Denzongpa as Professor Bohra, K. Vaseegaran's mentor, who is secretly contracted to create similar robots for a terrorist organisation and upgrades Chitti using the red chip
- Santhanam as Siva, Vaseegaran's assistant scientist
- Karunas as Ravi, Vaseegaran's co-assistant scientist
- Cochin Haneefa as a traffic police officer
- Kalabhavan Mani as Pachaimuthu
- Delhi Kumar as Vaseegaran's father
- Raaghav as the neighbourhood bully
- Devadarshini as Latha, Sana's sister
- Revathi Sankaran as Vaseegaran's mother
- Sabu Cyril as Shah
- Chaams as one of the barbers working at The Park Hotel
- Devadas Kanakala as K. Bhajanlal, a customer at The Park Hotel
- Dheena as a thug
- Sugunthan as a police inspector
- Shriya as a curious student
- Boys Rajan as a professor (uncredited)

== Production ==
=== Development ===
In 1996, following the release of Indian, S. Shankar approached and pitched three storylines to Rajinikanth to consider for his next venture. This included scripts which would later become Sivaji: The Boss (2007), Enthiran (2010) and I (2015). Rajinikanth was sceptical and refused all three scripts at the time. Following the completion of his first directorial venture in Hindi, Nayak (2001), Shankar announced his next project, Robot, which was to feature Kamal Haasan and Preity Zinta. The film was to be produced by the now-defunct company Media Dreams, a division of Pentamedia Graphics. The film was reported to be a futuristic techno-thriller set in Chennai in around 2200 or 3000. Despite the completion of a photoshoot featuring Haasan and Zinta, the project was shelved as a result of scheduling conflicts with Haasan. Shankar consequently started work on Boys (2003).

After Boys, Shankar began work on his next feature starring Vikram, which was initially reported by Rediff.com to be Robot revived, but was later revealed as Anniyan (2005). One month post the release of Sivaji: The Boss in June 2007, he approached Shah Rukh Khan for the lead in Robot. Shankar had cast Priyanka Chopra in the lead opposite him. Khan was about to produce it under his own banner, Red Chillies Entertainment, but in October the same year the project was officially aborted due to creative differences between him and Shankar.

The project was revived in January 2008 with Eros International and the London-based production company Ayngaran International willing to produce the film. The state government of Tamil Nadu granted tax exemptions for films titled in Tamil, resulting in the new production being renamed Enthiran. While Sujatha was originally assigned to write the dialogue for the film, Madhan Karky took over after Sujatha's death in February 2008. In December 2008, Eros International withdrew from funding the project after financial difficulties caused by the box-office failure of Drona (2008) and Yuvvraaj (2008), with the subsequent departure of Ayngaran International, which struggled during the 2008 financial crisis. The film's production and release rights were sold to Sun Pictures.

=== Cast and crew ===
In January 2008, Rajinikanth accepted the lead role in the film for a salary of ₹450 million (Indian rupees). (Note: The average exchange rate in 2008 was 49.82 Indian rupees (₹) per 1 US dollar (US$).) Shankar rewrote the original script to suit Rajinikanth's acting style. Although Aishwarya Rai Bachchan was Shankar's original choice for the female lead in 2001, she declined it owing to a busy schedule and was replaced by Zinta. When Shankar revived the project with Rajinikanth, contenders for the part included Deepika Padukone, Shriya Saran and Rai, who was ultimately selected and paid ₹60 million. Rai's voice was dubbed by Savitha Reddy. (Note: In an interview with Geety Sahgal of The Indian Express, Shankar stated that Rai had her dialogues translated from Tamil to English and rehearsed it the night before each day of filming.)

Several actors were considered for the role of Professor Bohra, including Amitabh Bachchan, J. D. Chakravarthy, Sathyaraj and British actor Ben Kingsley, but it was Danny Denzongpa who eventually received it, making Enthiran his first film in Tamil. Dubbing for Denzongpa was provided by Kadhir. Comedians Santhanam and Karunas were cast to portray Vaseegaran's assistants Siva and Ravi respectively.

The soundtrack album and background score were composed by A. R. Rahman. Vairamuthu, Pa. Vijay and Madhan Karky authored the lyrics for the songs. Manoj Bharathiraja was signed on to be an assistant director after he approached Shankar and helped him find the location for Rajinikanth's house in the film. Arul and Manoj, uncredited, worked as body doubles for both the Vaseegaran and Chitti characters. Also working as assistant directors were Atlee, Shree and Karthik G. Krish. Sabu Cyril, in addition to being the film's art director, made a guest appearance as Shah, an interpreter between Bohra and the terrorist organisation.

R. Rathnavelu was hired as the cinematographer after Ravi K. Chandran, Nirav Shah and Tirru were considered. Anthony was the film's editor. Yuen Woo-ping, known for his work in The Matrix trilogy and the Kill Bill films, was selected to be the stunt co-ordinator, while Legacy Effects, a visual effects studio based in the United States, were in charge of the prosthetic make-up and animatronics in the film. Munich-based film technical company, Panther, were responsible for the crane shots. (Note: In filmmaking and video production, a crane shot is a shot taken by a camera on a crane or jib.) The film's subtitle captioning was done by Rekha Haricharan.

=== Costume design ===
Manish Malhotra and Mary E. Vogt were chosen to design the film's costumes. (Note: Vogt was also the costume designer for the Men in Black film series.) Fifty-seven costumes were used for Rai, including a "Mexican tribal" look that she sported during the filming of the "Kilimanjaro" segment. According to make-up artist Banu, no prosthetics were used for Rajinikanth to avoid bothering him by withholding his time on set. Additional make-up was by Vance Hartwell, an employee of Legacy Effects.

The visual appearance of Chitti was based on the G.I. Joe action figures. For Chitti's "villain robot" look, its hair was spiked and brown coloured lenses were used for its eyes, whereas for its "good robot" look, green coloured lenses were used. The wig used for Chitti's "villain robot" look had a silver streak in the middle, made out of Yak hair, while its leather jacket was designed by Vogt. To make Vaseegaran look mature, the team made Rajinikanth sport an Oakley beard. (Note: According to Banu, an Oakley beard is "neither a French beard not a full beard". It developed as a result of shaping Rajinikanth's already grown beard.) Suits made of copper were used for Chitti's costumes.

=== Principal photography ===
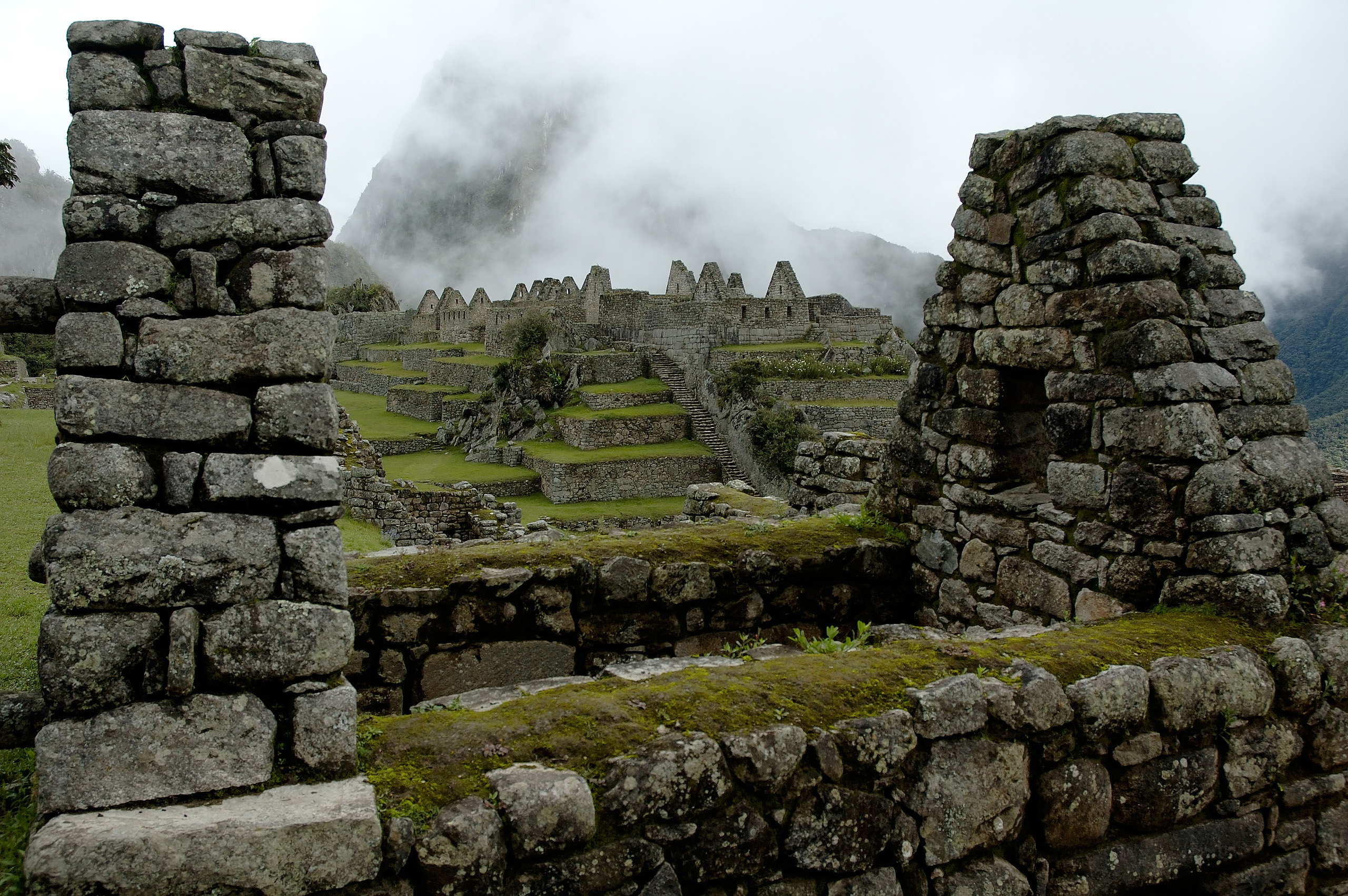
The residential section of the Incan city of Machu Picchu, which features in the song, "Kilimanjaro".

For Sabu Cyril's sets, Shankar required approximately twice as much studio floor space as for his previous film. After rejecting Ramoji Film City for technical reasons, Enthiran's producer, Kalanithi Maran, took six months to set up three air-conditioned studio floors on land in Perungudi owned by Sun TV Network. Filming began on 15 February 2008 at AVM Studios in Chennai. After the initial stages of filming, Shankar and Rathnavelu toured the world for three weeks, scouting for exotic filming locations. They visited Austria, Germany, Peru, Brazil and Argentina, looking for a backdrop to shoot the "Kilimanjaro" and "Kadhal Anukkal" segments, eventually deciding on Peru and Brazil. "Kilimanjaro" was filmed at the ruins of the Incan city of Machu Picchu in Peru, with some 100 Brazilian extras. It was choreographed by Raju Sundaram and supervised by Fernando Astete, director of the Machu Picchu archaeological park. "Kadhal Anukkal" was filmed in Lençóis Maranhenses National Park in northeastern Brazil.

The filming for Chitti's introduction to the international robotics conference was completed in December 2008 at Sri Sivasubramaniya Nadar College of Engineering and Vellore Institute of Technology, where more than 400 students were used as extras. Further footage was shot over five days at the Ennore Port on the Mitsui O.S.K. Lines car carrier, Neptune Ace. An action sequence where Chitti saves Sana from thugs was filmed in Lonavala, under the supervision of the action choreographer Peter Hein. Scenes featuring Rajinikanth as Chitti were captured over five days at the Perungudi Dump Yard in Chennai. Sabu Cyril told Uma Kannan of The New Indian Express that the sets for the climax sequence, which was filmed at Mayajaal, consisted of a tar road and glass buildings which rose to 65 feet (20 m), and that aluminium composite panels, reported to have cost ₹50 million, were also used to design the sets. (Note: The average exchange rate in 2010 was 45.09 Indian rupees (₹) per 1 US dollar (US$).)

The set for "Arima Arima", a sequence choreographed by Prabhu Deva, was designed and constructed by Cyril at Ramoji Film City in Hyderabad. Filming of the number took place over 22 days in April 2009. Junior artists were employed by Rathnavelu to wear masks of Rajinikanth. For the sequence entitled "Irumbile Oru Irudhaiyam", choreographed by Remo D'Souza and featuring Rai and Rajinikanth as Chitti, three different sets were used: one of copper, one of gold and one in silver. The musical number, which was filmed in AVM Studios for eight days, was the last portion of the film's principal photography. D'Souza incorporated the popping style of street dances, but encountered difficulties in performing the dance movements in tandem with the robot, and with the restrictions created by the rigid costumes. Principal photography ended on 7 July 2010.

=== Visual effects ===
Impressed with the film's script, V. Srinivas Mohan became the visual effects supervisor in December 2007. He asked Shankar to increase the filming schedules by six months to include pre-production requirements. Both Mohan and Shankar visited several visual effects companies, including the New Zealand–based Weta Digital and the United States–based Industrial Light & Magic, Cafe FX and Tippett Studio before partnering with Legacy Effects. The original Eros-Ayngaran visual effects budget was ₹700 million, but after Sun Pictures took over production, it was significantly reduced to ₹200 million. As a result, the visual effects team had to omit and alter some sequences, making Chitti wear sunglasses for most of the film to reduce the cost and difficulty of animating his eyes.

After a series of previsualisation tests, including a scene in which Chitti jumps on a train to save Sana, Mohan eventually decided to use the technique in 40 out of the 60 visual effects scenes featured in the film, consisting of 2,000 takes. Further previsualisation supervision was conducted by P. C. Sanath of Firefly Creative Studios, a visual effects company based in Hyderabad. 3D storyboards were constructed using 3D animation programs for every scene in the film and were shot from different angles. In an interview with Malathi Rangarajan of The Hindu, Mohan said all the pre-production work took one-and-a-half years to complete.

Rathnavelu used the 435 Xtreme camera and also wrote a 1,600-page manual, in which he listed all the possible angles from where he could film the characters Rajinikanth played. Legacy Effects and the Hong Kong–based visual effects companies Kinomotive Studios and Menfond Electronics took responsibility for the film's CGI work. To create the robots with Rajinikanth's appearance, a complete scan of his face in 3D digital format in all possible lighting conditions was conducted using the Doom Light Stage, (Note: The Doom Light Stage is based on an original research conducted by Paul Debevec at the ICT division of the University of California, Berkeley. The Light Stage systems efficiently capture how an actor's face appears when lit from every possible lighting direction. From this captured imagery, realistic virtual renditions of the actor are created in the illumination of any location or set, faithfully reproducing the colour, texture, shine, shading and translucency of the actor's skin.) so that his face could be replicated on the mannequins. The technique, according to Shankar, was previously used in The Curious Case of Benjamin Button (2008). The robot Chitti featured in the film was a mannequin made by a Legacy Effects team of 100 technicians in Los Angeles. For every robotic mannequin used, six puppeteers were employed to control the mannequin's movements.

== Themes and influences ==
Enthiran focuses on the battle between man and machine. Despite Shankar's claim that Enthiran was a purely original idea, it has been compared to Mary Shelley's 1818 novel Frankenstein, owing to the similar personae of Chitti and Frankenstein's monster, both of whom turn against their respective creators. K. Moti Gokulsing and Wimal Dissanayake, in their book Routledge Handbook of Indian Cinemas, noted the similarity between the two works, arguing that Chitti was "manipulated by Bohra to become a Frankenstein-like figure". Writing for The A.V. Club, Genevieve Koski observed, "The plot of Enthiran is essentially Frankenstein via [Isaac] Asimov's Three Laws of Robotics."

Director and film critic Sudhish Kamath called Enthiran "a superhero film, a sci-fi adventure, a triangular love story with a hint of the Ramayana", while remarking that Enthiran's similarities to The Terminator (1984) were "more than obvious. Not just visually—where we see the Superstar with one human eye and one scarred metallic eye but also intentionally spelt out when the bad robot announces that he has created Terminators." Kamath compared two of the film's robots to C-3PO and R2-D2, droids from the Star Wars film series, which was referenced in Enthiran when Vaseegaran refers to one of his creations as "R2". The film was noted to have similarities with the 2002 Kannada film Hollywood which had its lead actor playing three roles – one of which was a scientist and another was a humanoid robot invented by that scientist which falls in love with the girlfriend of his creator.

Although Shankar initially claimed that Enthiran would be made for all audiences, including those lacking computer literacy, the film is influenced by and makes references to many scientific principles relating to the fields of engineering, computer science and robotics, including terabytes and Asimov's laws of robotics. Visual references are made to the science books A Briefer History of Time (2005) and Freakonomics (2005). In his book Visual Perception and Cultural Memory: Typecast and Typecast(e)ing in Malayalam Cinema, Sujith Kumar Parayil notes the similarities between Kalabhavan Mani's role in the film to the one Mani played in the Malayalam film Sallapam (1996). Chitti taking revenge by duplicating himself and combining his duplicates together to form larger beings was compared to Voltron, Agent Smith in Reloaded and Revolutions (both 2003), and Indian mythology.

== Music ==
The film marked the debut of Rahman's daughter Khatija as a playback singer.

The soundtrack album to Enthiran was released on 31 July 2010. The original Tamil and dubbed Telugu versions were released by Think Music, while the dubbed Hindi version was released by Venus Music. Think Music purchased the release rights of the original Tamil and dubbed Telugu versions of the album for ₹70 million. The album of the film's dubbed Telugu version, Robo, was released on 6 August 2010, while its dubbed Hindi version, Robot, was released on 14 August 2010. After the second day of release, the album's original Tamil version reached the number one position in the Top 10 World Albums chart on iTunes, making it the first Tamil album to do so.

The Tamil album was officially released on 31 July 2010 with a promotional event held at the Putrajaya International Convention Centre near Kuala Lumpur, Malaysia. Co-hosted by Vivek and Punnagai Poo Gheetha, the event was attended by most of the film's cast and crew members. Other invited guests were Dayanidhi Maran, Radha Ravi, Vadivelu, Shriya Saran, Jayam Ravi, Ramya Krishnan, S. A. Chandrasekhar, Aishwarya and Soundarya Rajinikanth, Krish, and Sangeetha Arvind. Furthermore, Silambarasan, Vijayalakshmi, and Poorna were part of stage performances. The release event of the Telugu version, titled Robo, was held in Hyderabad on 6 August 2010, which was attended by Chiranjeevi, D. Ramanaidu, Mohan Babu, Srinu Vaitla, Kajal Aggarwal, and Kamna Jethmalani. The Hindi version, titled Robot, was released by Venus on 14 August 2010, in a function held in Mumbai. The event was attended by Amitabh Bachchan, Jaya Bachchan and Abhishek Bachchan, along with the crew of the film.

== Release ==
Enthiran was released on 1 October 2010. The film was dubbed and released in Hindi as Robot and in Telugu as Robo and later in Kannada as Bombat Robo. The film was released in 2,250 theatres worldwide, including 500 theatres in Tamil Nadu, 350 theatres in Andhra Pradesh, 128 theatres in Kerala, 23 theatres in Karnataka, and 750 theatres in North India. With an estimated budget of ₹1.32—1.62 billion, (Note: The Economic Times claims the film's budget to be ₹132 crore, whereas Anirban Bhattacharya of CNN Travel and T. S. Sreenivasan Raghavan of Bangalore Mirror state that it is ₹162 crore.) Enthiran was India's most expensive film up to that point, surpassing the Hindi film Blue (2009), which was filmed on a budget of ₹750 million. (Note: The average exchange rate in 2009 was 46.29 Indian rupees (₹) per 1 US dollar (US$).)

Enthiran became the first Tamil film to be released at the Colosseum kino, a Norwegian theatre complex in Oslo, and it was screened at the 21st Bath Film Festival, held in the United Kingdom in 2011. Additionally, a version of the film, edited to a running length of two hours, was released in Japan in May 2012, and later screened at the 24th Tokyo International Film Festival, where it won a special award under the section "Winds of Asia–Middle East". The original version later had a theatrical release in that country.

=== Marketing and distribution ===
The first poster for Enthiran was released on 8 September 2008. The film's trailer was released on 11 September 2010, at the Sathyam Cinemas theatre complex in Chennai. To promote Enthiran, AGS Entertainment organised a festival from 25 September 2010 until its release date, in which they screened popular films of Rajinikanth at the company's theatre in Villivakkam. In Coimbatore, the Department of Posts printed 100,000 post cards advertising the film. Sun Pictures invested a total of ₹500 million on promotional activities.

Advance bookings for the film began two weeks before the release date in the United States. In the Jackson Heights neighbourhood in New York, tickets were sold out within ten minutes of going on sale. In Kerala the distribution rights were sold for ₹50 million, while in Karnataka they were sold for ₹100 million. The distribution rights in Mumbai were sold to Shringar Films. In the United Kingdom, Enthiran was released by Ayngaran International, while Robot was released by B4U Network. DVD marketing in India was handled by Moser Baer; Ayngaran International released the two-DVD set of the film in early 2011.

ASTPL, an Indian software developer, also released a mobile video game based on the film, titled Enthiran The Robot.

=== Plagiarism allegations ===
The novelist Aarur Thamizhnadan made a complaint with the Chennai Metropolitan Police against the filmmakers in November 2010, stating that the producers plagiarised his 1996 novel Jugiba. Thamizhnadan demanded ₹10 million from the director and producers for damages and filed a case against Kalanithi Maran. In June 2011, the Madras High Court dismissed the case after a petition filed by Maran denying the allegation was approved. The case was dismissed by courts in June 2023. In February 2025, Shankar's assets amounting to approximately ₹10 crore were attached to the case by the Enforcement Directorate for violating Section 63 of the Copyright Act, 1957.

== Reception ==
=== Box office ===
The daily newspaper Business Line reported that Enthiran grossed ₹58 crore from all versions in the opening weekend, and The Economic Times stated it netted ₹117 crore by the end of its opening week. According to a February 2015 report by the Hindustan Times, the film has grossed ₹256 crore worldwide in its lifetime. Indo-Asian News Service stated in July 2015 that the film grossed ₹290 crore from both its original and its dubbed versions. Enthiran became the top-earning Indian film of 2010 ahead of My Name Is Khan and Dabangg and became the highest-grossing Tamil film at that point. It is currently 16th highest-grossing Tamil film worldwide.

Box Office India estimated that Enthiran netted ₹195 crore across India with the Tamil version netting ₹120 crore, the Telugu version netting ₹53 crore and the Hindi version netting ₹22 crore. The website estimated the overseas earnings of the film (including its dubbed versions) at approximately $12 million as of November 2010 with the Tamil version grossing $11 million and the remaining $1 million coming in from the Telugu and Hindi versions.

In Japan, the film grossed $407,438, including $370,697 for the Hindi version and $36,741 for the Tamil version.

=== Critical response ===
On the review aggregator website Rotten Tomatoes, 77% of 13 critics' reviews are positive, with an average rating of 6/10.

==== India ====
Enthiran received positive reviews from critics in India, with praise particularly directed at Rathnavelu's cinematography, Cyril's art direction, Srinivas Mohan's visual effects and Rajinikanth's performance as Chitti. Aniruddha Guha of Daily News and Analysis gave the film a rating of four out of five stars and believed it had the "best special effects ever seen in a Tamil film" and that it was "one of the most entertaining Tamil films—across all languages—ever made." Both Nikhat Kazmi of The Times of India and Kaveree Bamzai of India Today rated the film four out of five stars. Kazmi called it "the perfect getaway film". Bamzai praised Rajinikanth's acting in the film and said, "Rajni tells us why robot sapiens are superior to homo sapiens". Cable Shankar of Kalki magazine praised the technical aspects, music, stunts and direction while calling Chitti's character attracts more attention than Vaseegaran. He also stated that first half was interesting using Chitti's character but the second half had uninteresting sequences which proves to be an obstacle to the screenplay yet they manage to compensate with graphics in the film's climax and concluded saying little bit of science fiction + usual emotions + many Rajinis + logic = Enthiran.

Both Anupama Chopra of NDTV and Pavithra Srinivasan of Rediff.com gave Enthiran a rating of three-and-a-half stars out of five. Chopra criticised the film's portions in the second half, describing them as "needlessly stretched and cacophonous", but concluded her review by saying, "Robot rides on Rajinikanth's shoulders and he never stoops under the burden. Aided by snazzy clothes, make-up and special effects, he makes Chitti endearing." Srinivasan, however, said that Shankar "strikes the balance between science fiction and masala quotient." She concluded that, "Whichever way you look at it, Enthiran is one of those rare films that give you just enough material to pull you in, and enjoy yourself." Rajeev Masand of News18 gave a rating of three out of five stars and said, "In the end, it's the fantastic special effects and an inspired performance from Rajnikant [sic] that keeps the film fresh."

Mayank Shekhar, writing for Hindustan Times, rated it three stars and said, "Leave aside jokes running on the Internet. This film, just a few feet too long, is fine entertainment by itself." Malini Mannath of The New Indian Express noted Enthiran for having "An engaging script, brilliant special effects, and a debonair hero who still carries his charisma effortlessly." Karthik Subramanian of The Hindu observed that actors "tend to get lost in special effects movies." He believed it was not the case in Enthiran: "Rajinikanth and [Aishwarya Rai] carry the movie on their shoulders, and considering the fact that much of the acting must have been in front of green screens, one has to say that nothing looks artificial right through." In contrast, Gautaman Bhaskaran of Hindustan Times rated it two out of five stars, writing that "Shankar's work slips into a loud, overdramatic and exaggerated mess".

==== International ====
Lisa Tsering from The Hollywood Reporter said, "Rajinikanth is such a badass that Chuck Norris is afraid of him." She praised the filming locations, especially the "Kilimanjaro" song sequence, but criticised the length of the film's climax portions. Genevieve Koski from The A. V. Club believed that Enthiran was "pretty good" and concluded that "if you prefer elaborate costumes and dance music mixed in with your killer-robot action, expect to enjoy up to an hour of Enthiran." Marc Savlov of The Austin Chronicle called Enthiran "the best apocalyptic sci-fi-romcom-melodrama-dance-off date movie of the year."

Roger Moore, writing for the Orlando Sentinel, gave a mixed review, evaluating it as a "melodramatic kitschy Indian musical about a robot built for national defense but who discovers his human side." Following the film's screening at the Mumbai International Film Festival, American film director Oliver Stone praised Enthiran's originality. Conversely, Joe Leydon of Variety believed that Shankar "riffs on everything" from Frankenstein to The Terminator, but suggested that the film was an "overwhelming mash-up of American-style, f/x-driven sci-fi spectacle and a Bollywood musical."

=== Accolades ===
At the 58th National Film Awards, Enthiran won for Best Special Effects and Best Production Design. It won in three categories at the 58th Filmfare Awards South for Best Cinematographer, Best Art Director and Best Costume Design. At the 5th Vijay Awards, it was nominated in fourteen categories and won in seven, including Best Villain and Favourite Hero for Rajinikanth, Favourite Film and Favourite Director. At the 17th Screen Awards, the film won awards under the Best Special Effects and Spectacular Cutting Edge Technology categories. However, the film missed out on being the official Indian submission for the Academy Awards since the jury noted out that it had sequences lifted from four American films.

== Legacy ==
Enthiran was the only Tamil film featured on the Internet Movie Database (IMDb) list of the 50 best films of 2010. The film was also included as a case study in a postgraduate elective course of the Indian Institute of Management Ahmedabad, "Contemporary Film Industry: A Business Perspective".

Scenes from Enthiran, particularly one known as the "Black Sheep" scene, (Note: The "Black Sheep" scene refers to a scene where Chitti finds Dr. Vaseegaran disguised as him amidst the robot army.) have been parodied in subsequent films, including Mankatha (2011), Osthe (2011), Singam II (2013), Ya Ya (2013), I (2015) with the same director, Jailer (2023), as well as in the Telugu films Parama Veera Chakra (2011), Dookudu (2011), and Nuvva Nena (2011). (Note: The satellite rights of Mankatha, Osthe and Singam II were purchased by Sun TV.) In the film, Chitti often introduces himself by stating the clock rate of his central processing unit, which is 1 terahertz (10^{12} hertz), and his random-access memory limit, which is 1 zettabyte (10^{21} bytes). This introduction dialogue, which is spoken by Chitti as "Hi, I'm Chitti, speed 1 terahertz, memory 1 zettabyte" became popular. Rajinikanth featured in a cameo role as Chitti in the science-fiction film Ra.One (2011).

On Rajinikanth's 64th birthday, an agency named Minimal Kollywood Posters designed posters of Rajinikanth's films, in which the Minion characters from the Despicable Me franchise are dressed as Rajinikanth. The digital art was hand drawn on a digital pad by Gautham Raj. One of the posters depicted a mutated Minion, reminiscent of Chitti's "villain robot" look in Enthiran. In March 2015, Kamath, in his review of the science fiction film Chappie, compared its eponymous lead character to Chitti in terms of learning human emotions. While promoting Avengers: Endgame in India, co-director Joe Russo said that the sequence in Enthiran where numerous clones of Chitti come together to form a giant python inspired a similar scene in Avengers: Infinity War's predecessor Age of Ultron (2015) where Ultron and his clones come together to form a gigantic version of himself, but that the scene was cut from the final version of the film to accommodate its runtime.

== Sequel ==
In September 2015, writer B. Jeyamohan announced that the pre-production stage of a standalone sequel to Enthiran was "going on in full swing" and that principal photography would commence once Rajinikanth finished filming for Kabali, by the end of that year. Nirav Shah would be the cinematographer and A. R. Rahman would return as music director, while Muthuraj would handle the art direction. Titled 2.0, the film entered production in December 2015 and was released worldwide on 29 November 2018. Rajinikanth reprised his roles as Vaseegaran and Chitti, with the additional cast played by Akshay Kumar and Amy Jackson.

== See also ==
- En Iniya Iyanthira
- Meendum Jeano
- Science fiction films in India
