= Legacy Effects =

American visual effects studio

Legacy Effects, LLC is an American visual effects studio specializing in creature design, prosthetic makeup, animatronics, and specialty suits.

== History ==
Founding partners Lindsay Macgowan, Shane Mahan, John Rosengrant, and Alan Scott supervised projects at Stan Winston Studio for over 20 years before Winston's death in 2008. After his death they formed their own company, Legacy Effects, with their first film being 2012 (2009).

Their first film outside of the United States was the Indian film Enthiran (2010), which was used for prosthetic makeup and animatronics.

== Visual effects work ==
The feature films Legacy Effects has contributed practical effects to include Avatar, Iron Man 2, Iron Man 3, The Avengers, Avengers: Age of Ultron, Alice in Wonderland, Snow White and the Huntsman, Life of Pi, Thor, RoboCop, Pacific Rim, Enthiran, 2.0 and X-Men: Days of Future Past. Legacy Effects also provided visual effects for films in the Terminator and Jurassic Park franchises, Terminator Genisys and Jurassic World.

Legacy contributed character design for films including Godzilla, John Carter, The Avengers, The Amazing Spider-Man, Cowboys & Aliens, The Hunger Games and Avatar.

Their work has garnered Best Visual Effects Academy Award nominations for Real Steel and Iron Man.

Legacy Effects has created visual and special effects for television shows such as Agents of S.H.I.E.L.D., Colony, Agent Carter, Grey's Anatomy and The Big Bang Theory, and contributed work to over 900 commercials. Notable examples of their commercial work include Destiny, Halo, The Aflac Duck, Maxwell the Geico Pig, The KIA Hamsters, Lunchables' Platy the Platypus and Jackie the Jackalope, and the Jack Links Sasquatch campaigns.

== iMut8r app ==
Legacy created the iMut8r app, first released in October 2009. A popular Halloween-themed photo manipulation app, iMut8r was named the iPhone App of the Week by Apple October 20, 2010. It is still regularly updated with new features.

== Comic-Con events ==
Legacy Effects gained attention for a 9'9" (2.97m) cosplay robot that was unveiled at the 2013 San Diego Comic-Con. Created through a partnership between Wired magazine, YouTube and Stan Winston School, the robot was built by Legacy over a period of 24 days and interacted with Comic-Con attendees throughout the four-day event, operated by a combination of suit performer and radio controlled animatronics.

For Comic-Con 2014, Legacy designed and built a 13'6" (4.11m) tall animatronic creature called Bodock the Giant Creature. Created through a partnership with Stan Winston School, Stratasys, and Wired magazine, the Giant Creature involved two separate animatronic characters and nine puppeteers. A majority of the hard surfaces were 3D printed by Stratasys. The goal of both events was to celebrate and promote practical special effects.

== Filmography ==
Film	Year	Effects
Fallout (TV series)	2024	Brotherhood Of Steel T-60 power armor suits
Scared to Death	2024	Visual effects
Alien: Romulus	2024	Visual effects
Indian 2	2024	Special makeup effects
Guardians of the Galaxy Vol. 3	2023	Visual effects
Avatar: The Way of Water	2022	Visual effects
Black Adam	2021	Visual effects
Nightmare Alley	2021	Visual effects
Finch	2021	Visual effects
Godzilla vs. Kong	2021	Visual effects
Paranormal Activity: Next of Kin	2021	Visual effects
Antlers	2021	Visual effects
The Suicide Squad	2021	Visual effects
Underwater	2020	Visual effects
The True Adventures of Wolfboy	2019	Visual effects
Dark Phoenix	2019	Visual effects
Terminator: Dark Fate	2019	Visual effects
Captain Marvel	2019	Visual effects
Avengers: Endgame	2019	Visual effects
The Mandalorian	2019–present	Visual effects
2.0	2018	Prosthetics and Animatonics
Avengers: Infinity War	2018	Visual effects
Godzilla: King of the Monsters	2018	Visual effects
Pacific Rim: Uprising	2018	Visual effects
The Shape of Water	2017	Visual effects
Diary of a Wimpy Kid: The Long Haul	2017	Animatronics
Jumanji: Welcome to the Jungle	2017	Visual effects
Power Rangers	2017	Visual effects
Guardians of the Galaxy Vol. 2	2017	Visual effects
Spider-Man: Homecoming	2017	Visual effects
Middle Man	2016	Visual effects
Suicide Squad	2016	Visual effects
Max Steel	2016	Visual effects
Teenage Mutant Ninja Turtles: Out of the Shadows	2016	Design and Models
Alice Through the Looking Glass	2016	Visual effects
Captain America: Civil War	2016	Visual effects
X-Men: Apocalypse	2016	Visual effects
The Jungle Book	2016	Visual effects
The Revenant	2015	Visual effects and Animatronics
Terminator Genisys	2015	Visual effects and Animatronics
Jurassic World	2015	Visual effects and Animatronics
Avengers: Age Of Ultron	2015	Visual effects
The Signal	2014	Visual effects
Godzilla	2014	Visual effects
Wish I Was Here	2014	Suit Design and Fabrication
Project Almanac	2014	Specialty Props
Captain America: The Winter Soldier	2014	Suit Design and Fabrication
Muppets Most Wanted	2014	80s Robot Design
X-Men: Days of Future Past	2014	Suit Design and Fabrication, Makeup effects
Teenage Mutant Ninja Turtles	2014	Design and Models
Grudge Match	2014	Specialty Puppets
RoboCop	2014	Robocop Suit and Robotic effects
Pacific Rim	2013	Pilot Suits and effects
World War Z	2013	Character Design and Makeup effects
Iron Man 3	2013	Prosthetics and Suit effects
Oblivion	2013	Specialty Costume Accessories
The Twilight Saga: Breaking Dawn – Part 2	2012	Animatronic and Special make-up effects
Life of Pi	2012	Replica and Animatronic Animals
Total Recall	2012	Sinth Suits, Animatronics and Prosthetics
The Bourne Legacy	2012	Animatronic effects
Halo 4: Forward Unto Dawn (web series)	2012	Suits and Weapons Design and Fabrication
The Watch	2012	Animatronic effects
The Amazing Spider-Man	2012	Lizard/Lizard Drone Character Designs and Prosthetic make-up
Snow White and the Huntsman	2012	Specialty Costumes
The Avengers	2012	Iron Man Suit and Practical effects
The Hunger Games	2012	Mutation Character Design
John Carter	2012	Character and Creature Design
7 Aum Arivu	2011	Special effects
The Muppets	2011	80s Robot and Muppet Man Design
The Twilight Saga: Breaking Dawn – Part 1	2011	Animatronic and Special make-up effects
Real Steel	2011	Animatronic effects
Cowboys & Aliens	2011	Alien Creature effects
Thor	2011	Frost Giant Prosthetics and Suit effects
I Am Number Four	2011	Creature Design
Enthiran	2010	Animatronic effects and Prosthetic make-up
Passion Play	2010	Animatronic effects
Dinner for Schmucks	2010	Mechanical Vulture, Animatronic effects
Iron Man 2	2010	Suit Construction and Animatronics: Iron Man/Whiplash
Alice In Wonderland	2010	Special make-up effects: Red Queen courtier characters creation and design
Shutter Island	2010	Visual and make-up effects
Avatar	2009	Character Design and Specialty Props Manufacturing (as Stan Winston Studio and Legacy Effects)
2012	2009	Animatronic effects
