= Chitti (character) =

Enthiran film series fictional character

- Enthiran character
- Rajnikanth as Chitti in Enthiran (2010)
- First appearance: Enthiran (2010)
- Last appearance: 2.0 (2018)
- Created by: S. Shankar
- Portrayed by: Rajnikanth

In-universe information
- Alias: 2.0
- Species: Andro-humanoid robot
- Significant other: Nila
- Origin: Chennai, Tamil Nadu, India
- Nationality: Indian
- Creator: Dr. Vaseegaran

Chitti is a one of main characters of the Enthiran film series. The character was portrayed by Rajinikanth in Enthiran, 2.0 and as a cameo in Ra.One. Chitti was imagined, created and developed by S. Shankar.

== Concept and creation ==
The visual appearance of Chitti was based on the G.I. Joe action figures. For Chitti's 2.0 version look, its hair was spiked and brown coloured lenses were used for its eyes, whereas for its "good robot" look, green coloured lenses were used. The wig used for Chitti's 2.0 look had a silver streak in the middle, made out of yak hair, while its leather jacket was designed by Vogt. Suits made of copper were used for Chitti's costume.

== Biography ==
=== Creation & Alter-ego ===
Chitti (played by Rajnikanth) is a humanoid robot created by Dr. Vaseegaran, (also played by Rajinikanth). Dr Vaseegaran, who is specialized in robotics, created Chitti after a decade of unsuccessful attempts and intensive research. Vaseegaran makes Chitti an exact look-alike of himself. The robot is named Chittibabu by Vaseegaran's mother, which Vaseegaran shortens to Chitti.

Vaseegaran made Chitti interact with people outside the lab to socialize him with the outside world and saw how he used his intellects and abilities amongst humans. Chitti was enrolled into AIRD evaluation but was failed by Dr. Bohra (played by Danny Denzongpa) when the former attempted to stab Vaseegaran as per Bohra's command, who wanted to prove that Chitti could easily be manipulated and could not be enrolled in the army. In order for the robot to understand human behavior, Vaseegaran taught the robot about emotions and upgraded the software to give it the ability to comprehend and exhibit human emotions. Sometime later, Chitti successfully helped Sana's pregnant friend, Latha, give birth to a baby, despite it being complicated. Bohra belatedly gave Chitti clearance to pass the AIRD evaluation. But then the robot fell in love with the scientist's girlfriend, Sana (played by Aishwarya Rai) and thus it caused conflict between them. Chitti even got distracted into talking about Sana during the Indian army evaluation and hence failed it. Angered by the robot, Vaseegaran chopped the robot into pieces and dumped it into a landfill site. He was found by Dr. Bohra and upgraded into advanced version 2.0 with additional software, 'red chip' which functions as a destructive program installed in Chitti's software system. He converts Chitti into a ruthless killer and then Chitti turned into a destructive killing machine. He then went after Vaseegaran and Sana and crashed their wedding. He showed numerous other powerful abilities including shapeshifting as well as duplicating. However, Vaseegaran managed to defeat and stop Chitti by deactivating him.

Initially ordering Vaseegaran death penalty by the court, Chitti explained that Bohra was the actually the cause of his deviant behavior by showing footage of Bohra who installed a red chip inside of him. The court accepted the footage as evidence and acquitted Vaseegaran, but ordered Chitti to be dismantled due to how much damage and destruction he had caused. While dismantling himself, Chitti told a story and apologized to everyone for all the trouble. His body parts were then displayed in the museum in the year 2030 as the most advanced humanoid robot ever built.

=== Reassemblation and battling Pakshi ===
Chitti is forced to be reassembled by Dr. Vaseegaran and the Indian Army in order to stop the Fifth force, which is controlled by Pakshi Rajan, an ornithologist (played by Akshay Kumar) turned into a vengeful spirit. But Chitti is defeated and destroyed in his original form by the antagonist, which leads his CPU head to be rebooted in another advanced mechanical body, identifying himself as Chitti reloaded version '2.0', and will also fall in love with his female counterpart, the super-android Nila (played by Amy Jackson), also created by Vaseegaran. Alongside Chitti, there is another robot created known as "Kutty" (3.0), which is a microbot capable of shapeshifting.

== Legacy ==
Chitti briefly appeared in the film Ra.One in a non-canon appearance. The character was computer generated; some accounts state that Rajinikanth only recorded body movements which served as the basis for the computer-generated cameo, while others state that a body double was used, with Rajinikanth's likeness as Chitti digitally added.

== Powers and abilities ==
Chitti is described by Vaseegaran as an advanced "andro-humanoid" robot. Over his metallic body, he sports synthetic inorganic skin moulded after Vaseegaran himself. He is designed with a speed capacity of 1 terahertz (THz) (10^{12} hertz) and a memory capacity of 1 zettabyte (10^{21} bytes).

Chitti is initially programmed with a broad range of knowledge, including academic subjects, martial arts, communication, creative skills, athletics and science. Beneath his synthetic skin, he resists fire, water and acid.

In his original form, he is partially resistant to severe damage such as gunshots, though he can still be damaged or destroyed by properly aimed and adequately forceful attacks such as being chopped with an axe in the joints. Severe electrocution can also overload short-circuit him. As long as his CPU head is still functioning, Chitti is able to repair or fix back his minor parts such as his eyes. However, for large damage such as limbs being chopped off, he can only put them back in place and function at a much slower speed.

Chitti's eyes are able to not only see and scan his surroundings to highly acute detail, including X-ray vision, but they can also serve as high-definition projectors. His eyes also allow him to pick up additional skills and literature within seconds. He can also perform virtual phone calls, displaying his caller or receiver through his eyes as a hologram. However, on the downside, the eyes get bleached when exposed to the flashlight.

Chitti has super strength, capable of tossing an accelerating police car above itself, and stamina, while he still has battery charge. Aside from Chitti's strength and durability, his most powerful weapon is his built-in electromagnetic body, which can attract any metallic object and weaponize it. This and his connection to electronic devices give him enhanced technopathy and telekinesis.

Chitti's only known weaknesses are flashing lights from photography or direct sunlight, which causes a "vision bleach" and temporarily distort his sight, and his susceptibility to battery drainage. However, in the case of the latter, he just needs to absorb a bare minimum amount of electric power to recharge himself in a matter of seconds.
