= Panther (company) =

Panther GmbH
- Company type: GmbH
- Founded: 1986
- Founder: Erich Fitz
- Headquarters: Aying, Germany
- Area served: Worldwide
- Key people: Managing Director Andreas Fitz
- Total assets: 6 Mio. Euro
- Website: www.panther.tv

Panther GmbH is a film technical company situated in Aying, Munich. It develops and produces professional camera cranes and dollies. It built the first ever electro-mechanical camera dolly, the "Super Panther". Company founder Erich Fitz received the 1990 Oscar "Scientific & Engineering Award".

== History ==
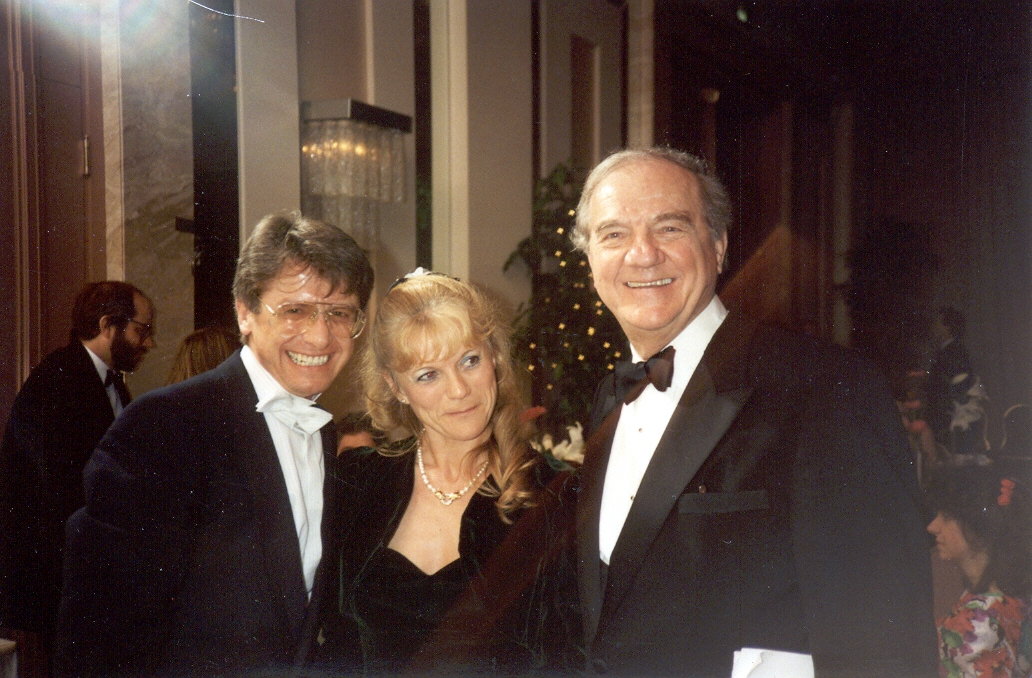
1990 - Founder Erich Fitz (left), Waltraud Fitz (middle) and Karl Malden (right) at the ceremony of technical Oscars, the "Scientific and Engineering Award" (AMPAS)

Panther GmbH was founded in 1986 by Erich Fitz. It specialized in the production, sales, and rental of film equipment. In 1990, Panther and its HTG GmbH subsidiary (founded in 1988), moved to Oberhaching. In 1991, two more rental outlets opened in Prague and Hamburg. In 1999 Fitz decided, because of the expansion, to build new premises, which opened in 2001.

In 2008, at the Cinec in Munich, Panther celebrated the 25th anniversary of producing Panther Dollies and presented the 1000th electro–mechanical dolly, which was built in gold for the occasion.

In 2010, Panther developed the Tristar and opened an outlet in Berlin. A year later, the Fitz family changed their strategy and ended their rental business as they did not want to compete with their customers. Panther Rental Prague was sold to ARRI. In 2012. Panther Rental points in Munich, Hamburg, and Berlin were sold to a subsidiary of Bavaria Studios and Production Services, to complete the strategy changes met in 2011.

Andreas Fitz, son of Erich, bought all shares from his family and became Executive President of the company. Thereafter, the company concentrated on the development and distribution of dollies and cranes.

== Products ==
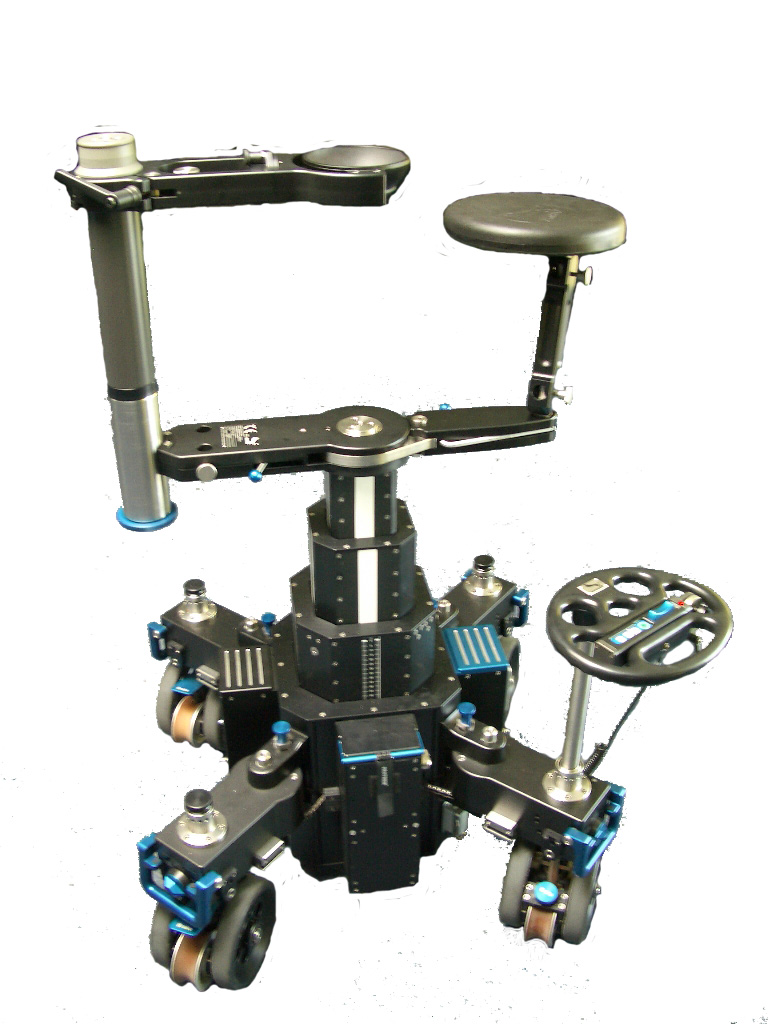
Tristar dolly with patented "High-Low-Drehkreuz"

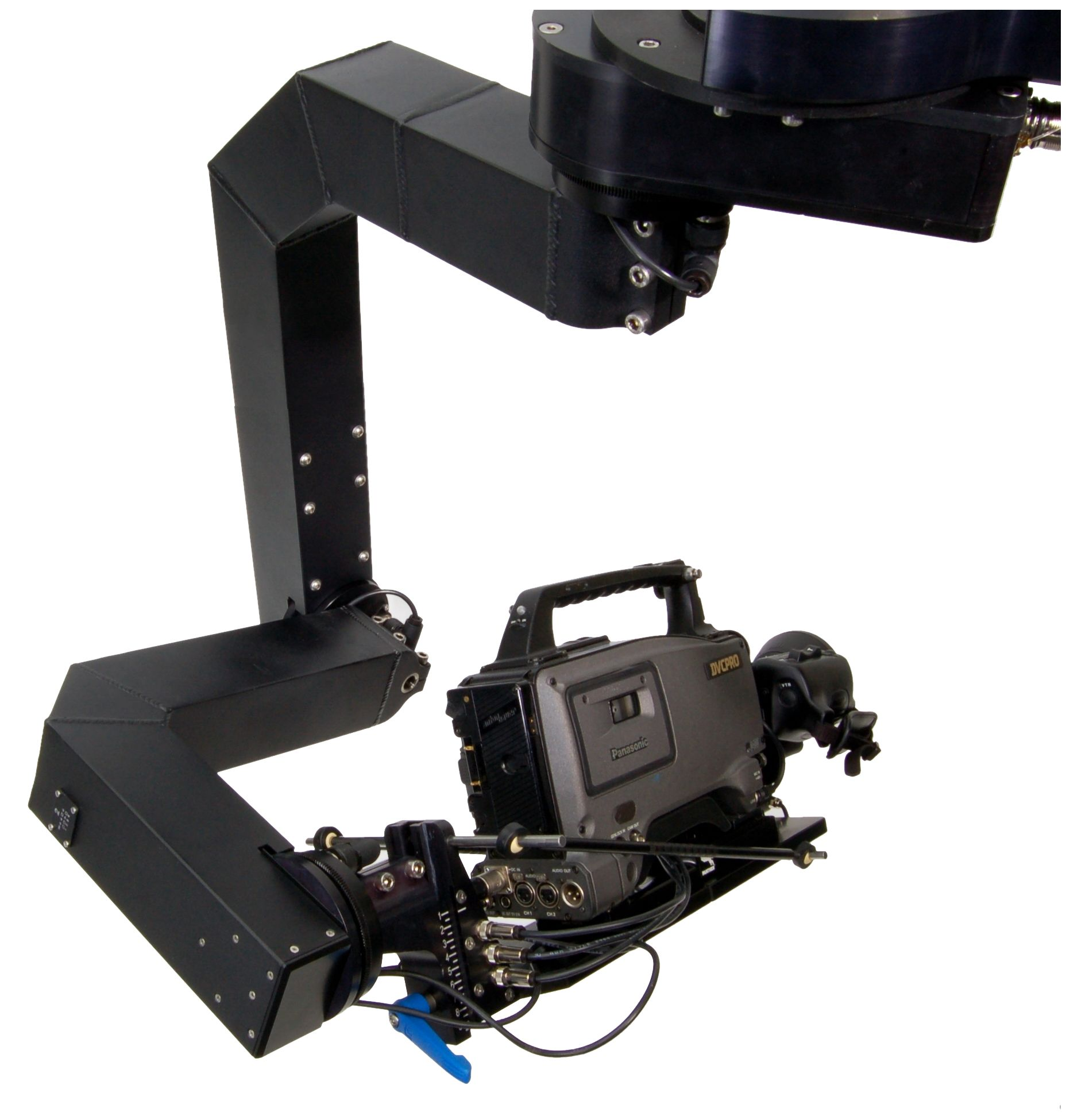
Trixy Remote Head - 3 axis system

The company produces film cranes, dollies, remote-controlled swivel and angle setups for cameras, tripods and support for cameras.

Panther established many patents for their products and developments.

- Linear column guiding
- Combi – wheels
- “Crab and Steer“ steering gear
- Foldable Dolly
- Fluid heads
- Film objective
- Transport system for camera cranes
- Pedestal
- High-low-turnstile
- Dolly platform system

== Panther Prize ==
Beginning in 1999, the company Panther GmbH presented the “Panther Prize“ for young talent. The prize is awarded during the International Festival of the Film High School in Munich. The jury chooses the best film from nominated short films. The winning director receives an award and a voucher for the rental of Panther-machines for their next production.

== Awards ==
- 1990: Oscar: "Scientific and Engineering Award" (A.M.P.A.S.) for the worldwide first electro-mechanic camera dolly, Super Panther"
- 1998: Cinec Award - for the "Evolution Dolly"
- 1998: Golden Frog - "for substantial technical contribution"
- 2002: Cinec Award - for the "Galaxy Crane"
- 2006: Cinec Award - for the "Foxy Advanced Crane"
- 2014 Cinec Award for the "Precision Levelling Track"
