= I (2015 film) =

2015 Indian film by Shankar

- Theatrical release poster
- Directed by: Shankar
- Screenplay by: Shankar
- Story by: Shankar
- Dialogues by: Subha
- Produced by: V Ravichandran: D. Ramesh Babu
- Starring: Vikram; Amy Jackson; Suresh Gopi; Upen Patel
- Cinematography: P. C. Sreeram
- Edited by: Anthony
- Music by: A. R. Rahman
- Production company: Aascar Films Pvt. Ltd.
- Distributed by: Aascar Films Pvt. Ltd.
- Release date: 14 January 2015
- Running time: 188 minutes
- Country: India
- Language: Tamil
- Budget: ₹100 crore
- Box office: ₹239–240 crore (Note: I's reported worldwide gross varies between ₹239 crore (NDTV, Hindustan Times) – ₹240 crore (Forbes))

I is a 2015 Indian Tamil-language romantic action thriller film directed and co-written by Shankar, produced and distributed by V. Ravichandran under Aascar Films. The film stars Vikram, Amy Jackson and Suresh Gopi in the lead roles along with Santhanam, Ramkumar Ganesan, Upen Patel, M. Kamaraj and Ojas Rajani in supporting roles. The film, told in nonlinear narrative, tells the story of Lingesan, a bodybuilder-turned-supermodel, who sets out to exact revenge against his enemies after they disfigure him by injecting him with the I virus. Parts of the film were loosely based on The Hunchback of Notre Dame and Beauty and the Beast.

The music was composed by A. R. Rahman, while the cinematography and editing were handled by P. C. Sreeram and Anthony. The production design was handled by T. Muthuraj, while the VFX were designed by V. Srinivas Mohan through Rising Sun Pictures. Weta Workshop had worked on the digital and prosthetic make-up and background arts for the film. Principal photography commenced on 15 July 2012. The filming lasted for two years and eight months, during which shooting was done extensively in China. Further schedules were filmed in locations in Chennai, Bangkok, Jodhpur, Kodaikanal, Pollachi, Bangalore and Mysore. The climax was shot in the railway stations of Chengalpattu, Rayagada, Berhampur and Visakhapatnam. The film was released in Telugu and Hindi languages, along with the original version.

I was released on 14 January 2015, coinciding with Pongal festival, and received positive reviews from critics with praise for its direction, cast performances (especially Vikram, Amy Jackson, and Suresh Gopi), cinematography, VFX, production design, action sequences and music. The film was a commercial success, grossing ₹240 crore worldwide, becoming one of the highest grossing Tamil films of all time and Vikram's highest-grossing film until Ponniyin Selvan: I. Vikram won the Filmfare Award for Best Actor – Tamil for his performance in the film.

== Plot ==
Lingesan is an ambitious bodybuilder from Chennai whose ultimate goal is to win the prestigious Mr. India pageant. After securing the title of Mr. Tamil Nadu, he earns a direct entry into the national competition. He harbours an intense crush on Diya, a prominent supermodel. Diya's career is abruptly derailed when John, her manipulative co-star, blacklists her across major advertising agencies after she rejects his unwanted sexual advances. Desperate to salvage her career, Diya replaces John with Lingesan for an upcoming high-profile commercial shoot in China. Because the shooting schedule directly clashes with the Mr. India pageant, Lingesan chooses to sacrifice his lifelong bodybuilding ambitions to help her.

Undergoing a radical makeover by a transgender stylist named Osma Jasmine, Lingesan is rebranded as "Lee" by Diya for the fashion industry. He initially struggles with intense shyness on set. To help him relax, Diya feigns romantic interest on the advice of her director. Although the tactic succeeds, Lingesan is deeply hurt when she reveals the deception. He subsequently pivots his focus entirely toward his modelling career. The duo achieves massive commercial success as a premier modelling pair, and over time, Diya genuinely reciprocates Lingesan's affection, culminating in their formal engagement.

Lingesan's meteoric rise earns him a cabal of ruthless enemies: John, whose modelling career collapses due to Lingesan's popularity; Osma, whose romantic advances Lingesan firmly rejected; Indrakumar, an industrialist who suffered immense corporate losses after Lingesan refused to endorse a beverage reported to be pesticide-laced; and Ravi, a rival bodybuilder humiliated by his defeat at the Mr. Tamil Nadu pageant. These four individuals conspire to ruin him, eventually kidnapping and brutally assaulting him. The following morning, Lingesan awakens in his car with no memory of the encounter.

Days before his wedding, Lingesan notices alarming physical symptoms, including rapid hair loss, teeth falling out, and severe skin lesions. He seeks medical counsel from Dr. Vasudevan, a trusted family physician and guardian to Diya's household. Vasudevan diagnoses him with a rare, incurable genetic disorder that triggers premature ageing. As Lingesan's body rapidly deforms into that of a hunchback, he fakes his death in a car accident to spare Diya from a life with him, retreating into total isolation. Believing Diya is emotionally ruined, Lingesan requests Vasudevan to marry her. Vasudevan agrees, and a wedding date is set.

On the eve of the wedding, another physician, Dr. Thiruvengadam, discovers that Lingesan's condition is not genetic. Instead, he is suffering from an advanced H4N2 influenza strain engineered as the lethal "I" virus, which can only be introduced via direct injection. Lingesan discovers that his four enemies—and, to his horror, Vasudevan himself—orchestrated the plot. Vasudevan had harboured an obsessive fixation on Diya since her childhood and sided with the conspirators out of jealousy when she chose Lingesan. It was Vasudevan who injected the virus while Lingesan was unconscious after the fight when he was kidnapped. Enraged and betrayed, Lingesan abducts Diya from the wedding venue, securing her in an isolated mansion without exposing his identity.

Aided by his loyal friend Babu, Lingesan executes a calculated campaign of non-lethal revenge to poetically disfigure his tormentors. He traps Ravi and sets him on fire, leaving him with severe third-degree burns. He taints Osma's cosmetic products with a specialised chemical compound, causing her to develop severe, irreversible hypertrichosis. He douses Indrakumar in concentrated sugar syrup, unleashing a swarm of bees that sting him into permanent disfigurement. He lures John onto a moving train, orchestrating a fight that leaves John permanently deformed by high-voltage electrocution. Finally, he tricks Vasudevan into repeatedly injecting himself with the virus that causes elephantiasis under the guise of a rabies antidote, causing Vasudevan's entire body to bloat and swell horrifically.

With his vengeance complete, Lingesan reveals his true identity and physical deformity to Diya. Though initially shocked, her love remains steadfast. Rejecting societal expectations, they choose to live a secluded life together in the countryside. Embracing a rigorous recovery regimen consisting of advanced stem-cell therapy, blood transfusions, yoga, physiotherapy, and alternative medicine, Lingesan slowly reverses the viral damage and gradually restores his original physical form.

== Cast ==
As per the film's opening and end credits.

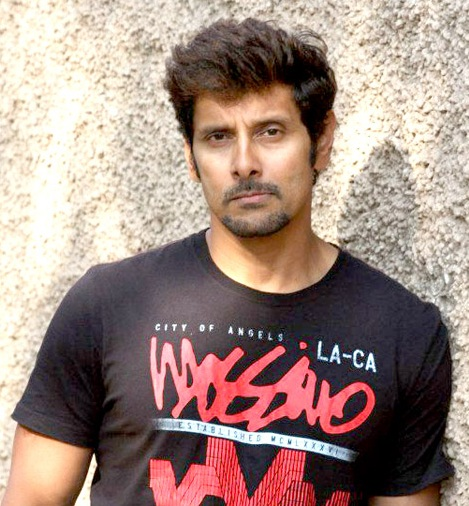
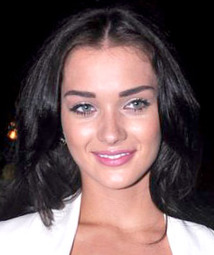
Vikram and Amy Jackson, the lead actors.
- Vikram as Lingesan "Lee", a bodybuilder-turned supermodel who transforms into a deformed hunchback through an influenza virus injected in him.
- Amy Jackson as Diya, a supermodel and Lingesan's love interest (Voice dubbed by Raveena Ravi)
- Suresh Gopi as Dr. Vasudevan, Diya's family doctor and guardian
- Santhanam as Babu, Lingesan's best friend
- G. Ramkumar as Indrakumar, a businessman
- Upen Patel as John, a supermodel, who loses his fame because of Lingesan's rise
- M. Kamaraj as Ravi, a bodybuilder and Lingesan's rival
- Ojas Rajani as Osma Jasmine, a transgender makeup artist
- Shree Karthick as Sushil's assistant director
- Yogi Babu as Keerthivasan's fan
- R. Sarathkumar as himself (cameo appearance)

Uncredited

- Mohan Kapoor as Sushil, ad film director
- Srinivasan as Keerthivasan
- T. K. Kala as Lingesan's mother
- Mahru Sheikh as Diya's mother
- Azhagu as Lingesan's father
- Radha Ramakrishnan as Maya, modelling agency head

== Production ==
=== Origin ===
In an interview with the Tamil channel Sun TV, held shortly after the release of Enthiran in October 2010, the film's lead actor Rajinikanth revealed that Shankar had approached and pitched three storylines for him to consider for his next venture, 15 years ago, post the release of his directorial, the Kamal Haasan-starrer Indian (1996). Rajinikanth was impressed with two of the scripts and agreed to star in the films, which became Sivaji (2007) and Enthiran (2010). The third script narrated by Shankar was centered on an aspiring bodybuilder who would later turn into a deformed hunchback following a freak accident. Rajinikanth was sceptical of it and refused it. (Note: The claim was also backed by composer A. R. Rahman who, in the press meet held to unveil the film's Hindi version, disclosed to the media that Shankar had discussed the film with him almost 15 years ago.) Following the release of Nanban (2012), Shankar revived the project with Vikram in the lead, his second collaboration with the actor after Anniyan (2005).

=== Development ===
Shankar collaborated with writer-duo Suresh and Balakrishnan, to work on the script of his next film. His norm collaborator A. R. Rahman was signed in to compose the soundtrack album and background score for the film, working with Shankar for the tenth time. (Note: A. R. Rahman and Shankar had previously collaborated for nine films: Gentleman (1993), Kaadhalan (1994), Indian (1996), Jeans (1998), Mudhalvan (1999), Nayak (2001), Boys (2003), Sivaji (2007) and Enthiran (2010).) P. C. Sreeram was confirmed to do the film's cinematography in his maiden association with the actor. Action choreographer Peter Hein was initially roped in the project, but he had to back out, due to commitments with S. S. Rajamouli's film Baahubali (2015). As a result, Martial arts choreographer Yuen Woo-ping was selected for handling the stunt sequences. Additional stunt direction and supervision was done by Anl Arasu. VFX company Rising Sun Pictures under visual effects designer V. Srinivas Mohan was selected to provide the special effects in motion filming, while Indian art director Thotta Tharani was confirmed as the film's art director. In May 2012, Shankar visited New Zealand and met filmmaker Peter Jackson and Richard Taylor's special effects and prop company Weta Workshop. Sean Foot and Davina Lamont provided the prosthetic makeup for Vikram's beast get-up in the film and additional prosthetic makeup was done by Christien Tinsley and Dominie Till. Gavin Miguel and Mary E. Vogt were in charge of the costume designing of the film's cast.

The film was earlier reported to be titled as either Thendral or Therdal, while Azhagan and Aanazhagan were also used as alternate titles that Shankar had kept in mind. Since they were already used in the Tamil films released during 1991 and 1995, Shankar decided that a single alphabet would be the film's title. In mid-2012, the team confirmed that the project would be titled I. According to The Times of India, Shankar opted for the title I as he thought it "explains all the characteristics of the protagonist"; the word has a variety of meanings, which include "king, beauty, astonishment, guru, vulnerability, owner and arrow". The film's title got the name, as in the film, Lingesan (Vikram's character) was deformed due to H4N2 Influenza caused by the "I" virus that had transmitted due to an injection.

In September 2014, producer and distributor V. Ravichandran, stated the project would cost about ₹220 crore (US$23 million), however by October 2014, he and director Shankar was widely quoted as stating the budget would be less than ₹100 crore (US$10 million).

=== Casting ===
In April 2012, Vikram was selected to feature in the lead role. Priyanka Chopra was initially reported to be in talks for the female lead. Later, Asin's name was suggested along with Chopra. It was reported that Deepika Padukone was also approached, but she denied her involvement in the film. Model-turned-actress Evelyn Sharma eventually selected for the female lead, by an audition, but had opted out due to language reasons. She claimed this in an interview, more than a week after the film's release. Samantha Ruth Prabhu was then signed on, but she had opted out of the project citing scheduling conflicts. The role finally went to Amy Jackson, who was paid ₹7.5 million (US$78,000) for acting in the film. It became her second collaboration with Vikram after the film Thaandavam. Raveena Ravi dubbed the voice for her role. Ramkumar Ganesan, a leading film producer and the elder son of the late-Tamil thespian Sivaji Ganesan, was also added to the cast to play a pivotal role in the film. Jiiva was considered for portraying the antagonist, but was unable to accept the offer due to his prior commitments. The role instead went to Upen Patel. Hollywood actor Arnold Schwarzenegger was reported to play an award presenter for a brief scene. Ravichandran, however, denied the news, but said that he would appear in the audio launch of the film. To prepare for his role in I, Vikram took some weight loss and gain tips from Arnold as well. Make-up artiste Ojas M. Rajani, who previously worked with Shankar in Anniyan, was reported to play the role of a transgender make-up artiste in the film in addition to being the make-up artiste for Amy Jackson. Mr. Asia contest participant Syed Siddiq appeared in the action sequences featuring Vikram.

=== Characterisation ===
Vikram's look for the film after the character is deformed

In the film, Vikram plays the character called 'Lingesan', who considers Arnold Schwarzenegger as a role model and aspires to win the Mr. Tamil Nadu title. Shankar had crafted the hair style of Vikram by taking the front curl look of the younger Schwarzenegger as a reference. (Note: American actor Arnold Schwarzenegger, launched the film's music.) As per Shankar, among all get-ups in the film, the hunchbacked man character was the most difficult one to sketch. Vikram was confirmed to sport his hunchbacked get-up in most parts of the film. The bubbles observed on the character's face were reported to be designed by Weta. Amy Jackson plays a model in the film. On casting and re-defining her looks Shankar was quoted saying, "I wanted someone who could authentically look like a model and then fixed Amy Jackson". Vikram also went bald for the film to change his looks in the film easier. Santhanam was also asked to lose some weight for his character. For a cycle fight sequence shot in China featuring actual cyclists, Peter Ming and Alfred Hsing worked as an action choreographer and assistant action choreographer, respectively.

=== Filming ===
Principal photography officially commenced on 15 July 2012 accompanying a poster photo shoot that featured Vikram and Jackson. The first schedule of filming was completed in Chennai by early September 2012. The main cast and crew were off to China for a 50-day schedule to shoot certain stunt scenes while some song sequences were also filmed at locales in the northern part of the Hunan province. The schedule in China was wrapped up by late November 2012. In an interview with The Times of India, one of the film's line producer, Bill Chang was quoted saying, "We worked closely with S. Shankar for nearly 50 days in 2012, during which his film was shot in nine different locations. The range of locations available in China is simply mind-boggling. No other country in the world has such variety of locales ranging from colored mountains to futuristic city landscapes." Scenes in the song "Pookkalae Sattru Oyivedungal" were shot in Red Seabeach in Panjin and on Li river in Guilin. The canned footage of the track was put on hold by the Chinese film processing studio for a year, due to settlement disputes with the producer.

In January 2013, a fight scene was filmed at an abandoned, 20-year-old factory in Chennai. Sixty percent of the shooting was completed by the end of the same month. By March 2013, four songs and three major action sequences were shot around China, Bangkok, Jodhpur, Kodaikanal, Pollachi and Chennai. In June 2013, a three-week filming schedule was completed in Bangalore, Mysore and Chennai, and 75% of the shooting was completed by July 2013. Filming was almost wrapped up by March 2014, with just one song sequence and patch-work for the film remaining. Shankar confirmed that the song would be shot after the film's audio launch. As per reports, a song of 5 minutes duration (later deciphered as "Ennodu Nee Irundhaal") was shot for 40 days. For filming the track, Vikram had gained a lot of weight of about 110 kg as he had to wear bulky costumes for the number. The song sequence was filmed at Prasad labs in Vadapalani, Chennai where a set was erected by Muthuraj. The climax train fight scene between Vikram and Upen Patel was shot in the railway stations of Chengalpattu, Visakhapatnam, Rayagada and Berhampur. On 24 September 2014, Jackson confirmed that the shooting of the film was completed.

=== Post-production ===
By October 2013, Shankar had almost spent more than ₹60 crore (US$6.2 million) for the shooting and post-production, that include extensive visual effects work. Due to the budget constraints, V. Ravichandran had tightened the cost of the film, which led to several complications regarding its production. In February 2014, Vikram started dubbing for the first half of the film, and had completed within March 2014. On 3 April 2014, film critic and journalist Sreedhar Pillai stated that the film's trailer was in stages of editing. Patchwork and dubbing for the film was completed on 11 September 2014. The visual effects work began during mid-January 2014 and processed for more than 9 months, according to VFX supervisor Srinivas Mohan.

== Music ==
A. R. Rahman composed the soundtrack album and background score for the film. The music of the Tamil version was launched at the Nehru Indoor Stadium in Chennai on 12 September 2014. Arnold Schwarzenegger, who was the inspiration of the character Lingesan, was invited as chief guest. The dubbed Hindi and Telugu versions of the soundtrack album were released on 31 December 2014.

== Marketing ==
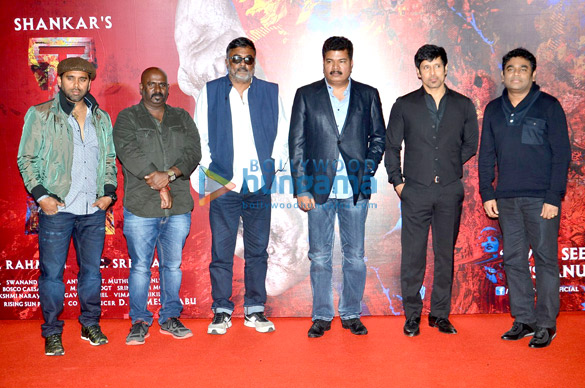
The first look poster launch event of the film in 2014

The first look title poster of the film was unveiled on 15 July 2012. Stills featuring the lead pair were released in March 2014. The official motion poster teaser of the film was released on YouTube on 8 September 2014. The motion poster crossed 1 million views by the third day of its release. Two posters released on 12 September 2014, with J. Hurtado of Twitch Film labelling them as "out of this world". The producer screened a sneak preview of the teaser and the song "Ennodu Nee Irundhaal" for the critics in late August 2014. The teaser carried a dummy music score that was not composed by A. R. Rahman.

The complete teaser trailer of the film was leaked on the internet on 2 September 2014. Although the leaked teaser lacked decipherability, the person who had leaked the teaser openly informed the team about it and challenged them to take action against him. After further inquiries, it was revealed that the culprit broke into producer Ravichandran's office during the night and had copied the teaser. However, Ravichandran refused to make changes to the leaked teaser, and planned to release it as per the original schedule.

The teaser was unveiled at the audio launch of the film. Hurtado in his teaser review wrote, "We see Vikram taking on multiple characters including a Quasimodo-type, kicking monstrous amounts of ass in various action sequences, running across water, riding a cyborg motorcycle, and dancing up a storm in some absurdly colorful backgrounds" and concluded by saying "Shankar is nothing if not a visual stylist, and it looks like he's pulling out all the stops for this one". Prajakta Hebbar of IBNLive wrote, "When we heard that Tamil filmmaker Shankar was making a new film, we fully expected it to be larger-than-life, with a funky storyline and starring popular actors. But what we didn't expect was that feeling of thrill and intrigue", asserting that "Vikram and Shankar have us hooked with the teaser". Nivedita Mishra of the Hindustan Times elaborated in her teaser review, "Without doubt, the film's special effects are great by any standards. Now, whether or not, they have been indigenously put together or have been outsourced from the West, the producers alone will know, but just the desire to make a film that gets its production value right yet doesn't overdo it, is good enough. Here's hoping it will ignite a desire among Indians to go for the skies." and praised the spectacular landscapes, edgy camera angles, action sequences before concluding that "Shankar has put in a lot of effort to make this magnum opus worth a watch if teasers are to go by." The teaser crossed 1 million views in just 12 hours of its release, making it the first Indian film to do so, beating the record set by the teaser of Bang Bang! (2014), which crossed 1 million views in 13 hours. It reached 7 million views in 2 weeks after its release, becoming the only Tamil film to cross the mark till date.

The making video of the film was released on 31 October 2014. The official trailer of the film was released on 17 December 2014. The Hindi-version of the trailer was attached with the prints of Aamir Khan-starrer PK (2014). The film was promoted by Vikram on Bigg Boss 8.

== Release ==
=== Theatrical ===
A report published during December 2013, stated about the release of I, which will hit theatres on the occasion of Tamil New Year (14 April 2014), thereby clashing with Rajinikanth-starrer Kochadaiyaan. However, the film was pushed due to production delays. In February 2014, trade circuits reported that the film will be scheduled for release on the summer of 2014 (May—June). During late-July 2014, it was further reported that the film will be releasing on the occasion of Diwali (22 October 2014), which was officially confirmed by the producers during August, in clash with Vijay's Kaththi and Vishal's Poojai. The date was later pushed due to extensive post-production and dubbing works. In November 2014, the producers officially announced that the film will release on the occasion of Pongal (15 January 2015). The release date was later finalised as 14 January 2015.

Prior to the release of the film, the Madras High Court passed an interim stay on the release till 30 January 2015, following a petition filed by Chennai-based Picturehouse Media Limited which alleged violation of financial and commercial agreements between the company and producers. However, Sreedhar Pillai, film critic and journalist had tweeted that the legal tussles between the two parties were solved amicably and announced that the film would release as planned.

==== Screenings and statistics ====
The film was scheduled to be released in 15,000 screens across the world, with 10,000 screens being allotted for the Chinese and English dubbed versions of the film. But, the plan was later backed off. The film was released on 3000 screens worldwide, including the Tamil, dubbed Telugu and Hindi versions of the film. In Tamil Nadu, the film was distributed in more than 400 theatres. In Kerala, the film was premiered at more than 232 theatres, the highest release for a Tamil film in that state. In the United States, the film was showcased 400 screens including the Tamil, Telugu and Hindi versions. It was also showcased in other overseas countries, such as United Kingdom, Australia, New Zealand, Malaysia and Singapore. The Telugu and Hindi-dubbed version of the film screened a day after the Tamil version's release, 15 January 2015. It is the first Tamil film to be released in Pakistan.

The advance bookings for the film began on 11 January 2015, and saw a "tremendous response". On the evening of 11 January, the advance bookings began at Sathyam Cinemas and tickets for three days of the opening weekend, were almost sold out. The film also saw "solid booking" in major theatres such as AGS Entertainment's cinemas, PVR Cinemas' Sangam Theatre at R.K. Puram and the Abhirami theatre. Owing to the ticketing response, several single screens theatres, including Kasi theatre conducted a special early morning show for celebrities and noted VIP personalities.

=== Distribution ===
In September 2014, Sushma Cine Arts announced that they have acquired the Tamil Nadu theatrical rights. The distribution rights for the Telugu-dubbed version titled I: Manoharudu were purchased by Tirupathy Prasad and R. B. Choudary's joint distribution firm Mega Super Good Films, for a price of ₹30 crore (US$3.1 million), thereby beating the distribution rights for Robo, the Telugu-dubbed version of Shankar's previous film Enthiran (2010) which was sold for ₹27 crore (US$2.8 million). The Kerala theatrical rights were sold to Global United Media. AGS Entertainment acquired the theatrical distribution rights in the Chennai and Chengalpet regions.

=== Home media ===
The media rights of the film was purchased by Jaya TV for ₹20 crore (US$2.1 million). The media rights included satellite rights and ringtones. The streaming rights were given to Amazon Prime Video.

== Reception ==
=== Box office ===
==== India ====
I earned around ₹20.8 crore (US$2.2 million) nett in South India on its first day, setting records in Kerala and Telangana and Andhra Pradesh. The film grossed over ₹34.74 crore (US$3.6 million) worldwide on its opening day. The film went on to collect ₹55.6 crore (US$5.8 million) nett in India in three days from all its versions. In its extended five-day weekend, the film earned ₹81.50 crore (US$8.5 million) nett in India from all three versions, with the Hindi version netting ₹7 crore (US$730,000). It grossed around ₹184.25 crore (US$19 million) from all versions twelve days after its release.

According to Andhra Box office, the film had collected ₹239.35 crore (US$25 million) worldwide and eventually became a commercial success.

==== Other territories ====
I grossed US$697,346 in Tamil version and US$10,373 in dubbed Hindi version in USA in its first weekend. I (Tamil) grossed US$201,207 and I (Hindi) grossed US$4,009 in Canada in its first weekend. I(Tamil) grossed US$258,764 in UK-Ireland in first weekend. I(Tamil) grossed MYR 2,162,742 in Malaysia in first weekend. In first 10 days, I (Tamil) grossed US$789,298 in USA, US$323,714 in Canada, MYR 3,146,295 in Malaysia. In first 17 days, I (Tamil) grossed £386,542 in UK-Ireland and MYR 3,404,582 in Malaysia.

=== Critical response ===
I received positive reviews from critics with praise for its direction, cast performances (especially Vikram), VFX, action sequences, cinematography and music, but criticized its lengthy runtime. On the review aggregator website Rotten Tomatoes, 45% of 11 critics' reviews are positive, with an average rating of 5.7/10.

Ronnie Scheib of Variety wrote "Shankar's visual ingenuity keeps things zippy for much of the hefty 188-minute running time, and star Chiyaan Vikram delivers a knockout three-pronged performance, but this cinematic bravura is offset by underdeveloped scripting, flatly one-dimensional villains and overdone lone-hero-vs.-swarms-of-murderous-attackers setpieces." Rachel Saltz of The New York Times wrote "I is exuberant and unselfconscious, but too cartoonish to engage your emotions. The onslaught of images and music will engage your senses, though, even as you're left giggling at the too-muchness of it all." J Hurtado of Twitch Film wrote "I strains the boundaries of self-indulgence and modern tolerance in a way that has become something of a plague among Indian blockbusters. The film is amazing to look at, features a number of amazing set pieces, and some appropriately over-the-top action sequences, but even with everything including a few kitchen sinks thrown in, it may go on a bit too long for its own good". Subhash K. Jha gave 4/5 stars, describing I as the "most exceptional" film from Shankar and wrote that it "takes us beyond the imaginable and the conceivable, fusing with fabulous flamboyance the fantasy element with a level of heightened reality that's commercial cinema's forte." Filmfare gave 4/5 stars, stating that "Shankar balances a social critique along with technical gimmickry and here the message centres about our obsession with physical perfection and beauty." Komal Nahta felt that Shankar's direction was "first rate" and wrote "His vision is unique and the translation of his vision on to the celluloid is brilliant. He has kept the narration so interesting that the viewer's eyes remain glued to the screen. He has given the film a huge canvas and has made it an audio-visual treat. Rajeev Masand from IBN Live gave 3/5 stars and wrote "I from visionary Tamil director Shankar is a work of staggering ambition, somewhat weighed down by the filmmaker's own indulgence...(it) may be far from perfect, but for the most part it's pretty entertaining stuff." The Times of India gave 3.5/5 stars and wrote "Shot mesmerisingly by PC Sreeram on virgin locales in China and India, with world class CG work, this spectacle works because at the core, it's a romantic-thriller told simplistically....This is pure escapist fare, but will resonate with those who read fairy tales at bedtime." Rediff gave 3.5/5 stars and wrote "The narrative lacks the pace; we usually associate with a Shankar's film. But he does tell a beautiful tale of love sullied by jealousies, greed and anger. The intriguing screenplay as the director alternates between the light-hearted past and the thrilling present keeps you engrossed." India Today gave 3/5 stars and wrote "It's not everyday you will get to watch a visually rich movie like this."

Baradwaj Rangan of The Hindu wrote "Vikram's terrific performance is let down by an uninspired, exhausting movie." DNA gave 3/5 stars, calling it a "great looking film but with shoddy writing and poorly sketched characters." Haricharan Pudipeddi of IANS, gave 2/5 stars and wrote "All that's big may not necessarily be great. Hope Shankar realises that much better films can be made on a smaller canvas and much lower budget." Sify wrote "I is definitely not the best of Shankar and he has to take the blame for poor writing. His story is predictable and there are no twists or scenes which keeps you engaged. Barring few eye-popping stunt scenes, a slew of beautiful unseen locations, breathtaking camera by PC Sreeram and few hummable songs by AR Rahman, I is very ordinary.". Deccan Chronicle gave 2.5/5 stars and wrote "While the movie and the effort is good technically, its content is just average." Gautaman Bhaskaran of Hindustan Times gave 2.5/5 stars, stating that Vikram's performance was the film's "only high point"; he noted that the film had similarities to the novel The Hunchback of Notre-Dame (1831) and the fairy tale Beauty and the Beast (1756), "without infusing any novelty into these age-old yarns." Deepanjana Pal of Firstpost wrote "I is too long, too stupid and too regressive to be entertaining" and also called it "superficial and the least fun Shankar film ever."

== Accolades ==
Award (Note: Awards, festivals and organizations are in alphabetical order.)	Date of ceremony (Note: Date is linked to the article about the awards held that year, wherever possible.)	Category	Recipient(s)	Result	Ref.
Ananda Vikatan Cinema Awards	7 January 2016	Best Cinematographer	P. C. Sreeram	Won	
Asianet Film Awards	7 February 2016	Most Popular Tamil Actor	Vikram	Won	
Asiavision Awards	18 November 2016	Excellence Award	Amy Jackson (Note: Also for Theri.)	Won	
Edison Awards	14 February 2016	Mass Hero of the Year	Vikram	Nominated	
Edison Awards	14 February 2016	The Gorgeous Belle	Amy Jackson	Nominated	
Edison Awards	14 February 2016	Best Editor	Anthony	Nominated	
Edison Awards	14 February 2016	Best Lyricist	Madhan Karky – for ("Pookkalae Sattru Oyivedungal")	Won	
Edison Awards	14 February 2016	Best Playback Singer – Male	Sid Sriram – for ("Ennodu Nee Irundhaal")	Nominated	
Edison Awards	14 February 2016	Iconic Spellbinder	Shankar	Nominated	
Edison Awards	14 February 2016	Best Stunt Director	Anal Arasu	Nominated	
Filmfare Awards South	18 June 2016	Best Film – Tamil	I	Nominated	
Filmfare Awards South	18 June 2016	Best Director – Tamil	Shankar	Nominated	
Filmfare Awards South	18 June 2016	Best Actor – Tamil	Vikram	Won	
Filmfare Awards South	18 June 2016	Best Music Director – Tamil	A. R. Rahman	Won	
Filmfare Awards South	18 June 2016	Best Lyricist – Tamil	Madhan Karky – for ("Pookkalae Sattru Oyivedungal")	Won	
Filmfare Awards South	18 June 2016	Best Lyricist – Tamil	Kabilan – for ("Ennodu Nee Irundhaal")	Nominated	
Filmfare Awards South	18 June 2016	Best Male Playback Singer – Tamil	Sid Sriram – for ("Ennodu Nee Irundhaal")	Won	
Filmfare Awards South	18 June 2016	Best Female Playback Singer – Tamil	Shreya Ghoshal – for ("Pookkalae Sattru Oyivedungal")	Nominated	
IBNLive Movie Awards	7 March 2016	Best Actor	Vikram	Nominated	
Norway Tamil Film Festival Awards	28 April–1 May 2016	Best Actor	Vikram	Won	
Norway Tamil Film Festival Awards	28 April–1 May 2016	Best Lyricist	Madhan Karky (Note: Also for Baahubali: The Beginning.)	Won	
Norway Tamil Film Festival Awards	28 April–1 May 2016	Best Cinematographer	P. C. Sreeram (Note: Also for O Kadhal Kanmani.)	Won	
South Indian International Movie Awards	30 June – 1 July 2016	Best Film – Tamil	I	Nominated	
South Indian International Movie Awards	30 June – 1 July 2016	Best Actor – Tamil	Vikram	Won	
South Indian International Movie Awards	30 June – 1 July 2016	Best Actress – Tamil	Amy Jackson	Nominated	
South Indian International Movie Awards	30 June – 1 July 2016	Best Actor in a Negative Role – Tamil	Suresh Gopi	Nominated	
South Indian International Movie Awards	30 June – 1 July 2016	Best Lyricist – Tamil	Kabilan – for ("Ennodu Nee Irundhaal")	Nominated	
South Indian International Movie Awards	30 June – 1 July 2016	Best Male Playback Singer – Tamil	Sid Sriram – for ("Ennodu Nee Irundhaal")	Nominated	
