= V. Srinivas Mohan =

Indian visual effects designer

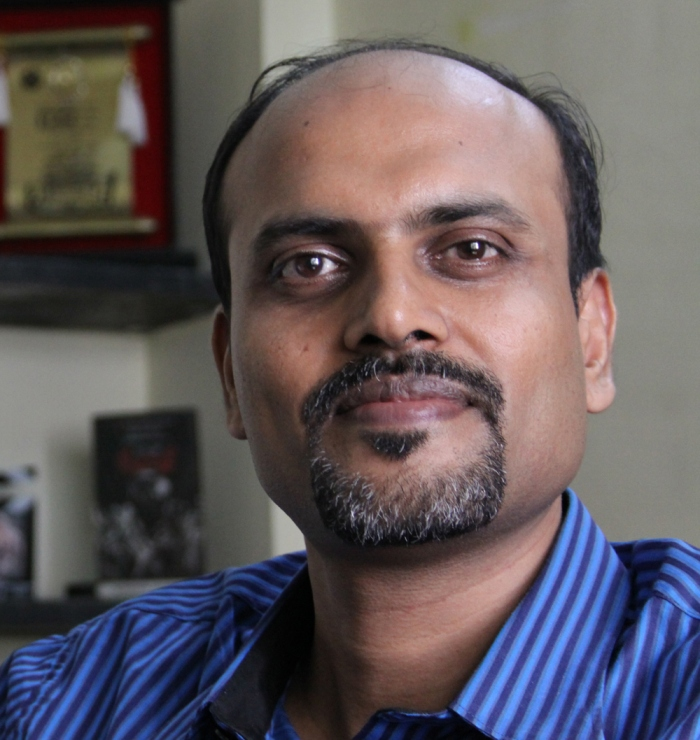
- Born: Vadlamudi Srinivas Murali Mohan; Vijayawada, Andhra Pradesh, India
- Occupations: Visual Effects Supervisor; Software Engineer
- Years active: 1996–present

Vadlamudi Srinivas Murali Mohan is an Indian visual effects designer, coordinator and supervisor known for his works primarily in Telugu, Tamil and Malayalam films. He is also known for his works in few Hindi and Kannada films. Srinivas fetched five National Film Awards for Best Special Effects for works such as Magic Magic (2003), Sivaji (2007), Enthiran (2010), Baahubali: The Beginning (2015), Baahubali: The Conclusion (2017), 2.0 (2018), RRR (2022) and Varanasi (2027).

== Early life ==
Srinivas Mohan was born in Vijayawada, Andhra Pradesh, India into a Telugu speaking family. Before getting into visual effects industry in Chennai, Srinivas worked as an animator and computer programmer.

== Filmography and awards ==
| Year | Film | Language | Visual Effects Supervisor | Digital compositing | Notes |
|---|---|---|---|---|---|
| 1996 | Indian | Tamil | | Yes | |
| 1998 | Jeans | Tamil | | Yes | |
| 1999 | Kadhalar Dhinam | Tamil | | Yes | |
| 2000 | Yuvakudu | Telugu | | Yes | |
| 2000 | Hindustan The Mother | Telugu | | Yes | |
| 2000 | Kushi | Tamil | | Yes | |
| 2000 | Palayathu Amman | Tamil | | Yes | |
| 2001 | Raavanaprabhu | Malayalam | | Yes | |
| 2002 | Run | Tamil | | Yes | |
| 2002 | Kunjikoonan | Malayalam | | Yes | |
| 2002 | Ramanaa | Tamil | | Yes | |
| 2003 | Dhool | Tamil | Yes | | |
| 2003 | Magic Magic 3D | Malayalam | Yes | | National Film Award for Best Special Effects |
| 2003 | Boys | Tamil | Yes | | |
| 2003 | Mizhi Randilum | Malayalam | | Yes | |
| 2003 | Enakku 20 Unakku 18 | Tamil | | Yes | |
| 2004 | Ghilli | Tamil | Yes | | |
| 2004 | Runway | Malayalam | | Yes | |
| 2004 | Anji | Telugu | | Yes | |
| 2005 | Ghajini | Tamil | | Yes | |
| 2005 | Sivakasi | Tamil | | Yes | |
| 2005 | Anniyan | Tamil | | Yes | |
| 2006 | Dishyum | Tamil | | Yes | |
| 2006 | Veyil | Tamil | | Yes | |
| 2006 | Imsai Arasan 23rd Pulikecei | Tamil | | Yes | |
| 2006 | Krrish | Hindi | | Yes | |
| 2006 | Bangaram | Telugu | | Yes | |
| 2007 | Sivaji | Tamil | Yes | | National Film Award for Best Special Effects |
| 2008 | Gaalipata | Kannada | | Yes | |
| 2008 | Kuruvi | Tamil | Yes | | |
| 2009 | Arundhati | Telugu | | Yes | |
| 2009 | Eeram | Tamil | Yes | | |
| 2010 | Enthiran | Tamil | Yes | | National Film Award for Best Special Effects; IIFA Award for Best Special Effects; Star Screen Award for Best Special Effects; Star Screen Award Special Jury for spectacular cutting-edge technology |
| 2011 | Anaganaga O Dheerudu | Telugu | | Yes | |
| 2012 | Nanban | Tamil | Yes | | |
| 2012 | Maattrraan | Tamil | Yes | | |
| 2013 | Raja Rani | Tamil | Yes | | |
| 2015 | I | Tamil | Yes | | |
| 2015 | Anegan | Tamil | Yes | | |
| 2015 | Baahubali: The Beginning | Telugu | Yes | | National Film Award for Best Special Effects; Best Special Effects in a Movie - NDTV Gadget Guru Awards 2015; Movers & Shakers Award for Best VFX at 24FPS International Animation Awards Nandi Award for Best Special Effects |
| 2018 | 2.0 | Tamil | Yes | | |
| 2022 | RRR | Telugu | Yes | | National Film Award for Best Special Effects |
| 2023 | Leo | Tamil | Yes | | |
| 2024 | Indian 2 | Tamil | Yes | | |
| 2025 | Game Changer | Telugu | Yes | | |
| 2025 | Baahubali: The Epic | Telugu | Yes | | |
| 2027 | Varanasi † | Telugu | Yes | | |
| 2027 | Indian 3 | | | | |
