= S. T. Venki =

- Died: 7 March 2013; Ooty, Tamil Nadu, India
- Years active: 1989–2001

S. T. Venki was an Indian special effects director. He was known for his frequent collaborations with S. Shankar.

== Career ==
Venki made his debut with Apoorva Sagodharargal (1989). For Anjali (1990), he experimented with optical printers. For the song "Mukkala Mukkabla" in Kaadhalan (1994), he used computer graphics for the first time in Tamil cinema to render Prabhu Deva's skeleton dance. Other notable graphic sequences include Kamal Haasan's face morphing into a lion for Indian (1996) and Aishwarya Rai's computer clone in "Kannodu Kaanbadhellam" from Jeans (1998). He noted that editing archival footage of Subhas Chandra Bose to make Haasan appear alongside Bose in Indian was challenging.

Venki won the National Film Award for Best Special Effects four times for Kaadhalan (alongside C. Murugesh), Kaalapani, Indian and Jeans. He won the Screen Award for Best Special Effects for his work in the film Nayak: The Real Hero (2001).

== Personal life ==
Venki was married to Meena, and they have a son. Venki died at the age of 56 on 7 March 2013 at Ooty.

== Filmography ==
As Visual Effects Supervisor

- Apoorva Sagodharargal (1989)
- Anjali (1990)
- Gentleman (1993)
- Kaadhalan (1994)
- Prem (1995)
- Kaalapani (1996)
- Kadhal Desam (1996)
- Indian (1996)
- Koyla (1997)
- Ratchagan (1997)
- Jeans (1998)
- Duplicate (1998)
- Mudhalvan (1999)
- Nayak: The Real Hero (2001)
- Super Star (2002)
- Virumbukiren (2002)
