= Anu Parthasarathy =

Indian costume fashion designer and entrepreneur

- Occupations: Entrepreneur, fashion costume designer, celebrity stylist
- Known for: Fashion designing
- Spouse: Parthasarathy
- Parent: Vietnam Veedu Sundaram

Anu Parthasarathy is an Indian fashion costume designer, who has worked on Hindi, Tamil and Telugu language films.

== Career ==
After graduating in interior designing in 1993, Anu Parthasarathy joined cinematographer P. C. Sreeram and film maker Jayendra Panchapakesan's company, JS, which made commercials for corporate companies. Anu worked there for three years, becoming acquainted with the entire production process of film-making. She later joined art director Sabu Cyril’s unit and was involved in the artwork for the Miss World 1996 beauty pageant that took place in Bangalore. She also worked with Cyril for artwork on films such as Virasat (1997), Saat Rang Ke Sapne (1998) and Pukar (2000).

Anu opted to specialise in a particular field within art direction, and in 1997, she started working as a costume designer, teaming up with Aneez, the wife of cinematographer Jeeva. The duo took on assignments for actresses including Simran, Jyothika and Ramya Krishnan during the period, and notably also did the costumes for Prashanth for the song "Poovukkul" in Shankar’s Jeans (1998). Her close association with Jeeva, led her to opportunities to work on Vaalee (1999) and Kushi (2000). In the 2000s, her notable projects included work on creating Ramya Krishnan's look in Panchathanthiram (2002) and Madhavan and Vidya Balan's looks in Guru (2007), where she had to recreate the year 1978. She also worked on Hindi-language films such as Phir Milenge (2004) and Bhool Bhulaiyaa (2007).

In the late 2010s, Anu has regularly collaborated with Sivakarthikeyan, notably styling his dual looks in both Remo (2016) and Seemaraja (2018).

== Personal life ==
Anu Parthasarathy is the daughter of film writer Vietnam Veedu Sundaram and Chella. Her husband, Parthasarathy, is an ad film maker and entrepreneur. She is a close friend of actress Khushbu.

== Notable filmography ==
- Jeans (1998)
- Vaalee (1999)
- Thullatha Manamum Thullum (1999)
- Kushi (2000)
- Thenali (2000)
- Priyamaanavale (2000)
- Dumm Dumm Dumm (2001)
- Poovellam Un Vaasam (2001)
- Little John (2001)
- Panchathanthiram (2002)
- Phir Milenge (2004)
- Perazhagan (2004)
- Manmadhan (2004)
- Vettaiyaadu Vilaiyaadu (2006)
- Sillunu Oru Kaadhal (2006)
- Guru (2007)
- Pokkiri (2007)
- Pachaikili Muthucharam (2007)
- Mozhi (2007)
- Bhool Bhulaiyaa (2007)
- Vel (2007)
- Abhiyum Naanum (2008)
- Kuruvi (2008)
- Yavarum Nalam (2009)
- Singam (2010)
- Aadukalam (2011)
- Ethir Neechal (2013)
- Anegan (2015)
- Kanchana 2 (2015)
- Remo (2016)
- Seemaraja (2018)
- Hey Sinamika (2020)
- DON (2022)
