= Kaalapani =

1996 Indian film by Priyadarshan

- Poster
- Directed by: Priyadarshan
- Screenplay by: T. Damodaran; Priyadarshan
- Dialogues by: T. Damodaran
- Story by: Priyadarshan
- Produced by: Mohanlal; R. Mohan (co-producer)
- Starring: Mohanlal; Prabhu; Tabu; Amrish Puri
- Cinematography: Santosh Sivan
- Visual effects by: S. T. Venki
- Edited by: N. Gopalakrishnan
- Music by: Ilaiyaraaja
- Production companies: Pranavam Arts; Shogun Films (in association with)
- Distributed by: Pranamam Pictures; Shogun Films; Amitabh Bachchan Corporation (Hindi)
- Release date: 6 April 1996
- Running time: 180 minutes
- Country: India
- Language: Malayalam
- Budget: ₹2.50 crore

Kaalapaani (transl. Black Water) is a 1996 Indian Malayalam-language epic historical drama film written by T. Damodaran and directed by Priyadarshan. Set in 1915, the film focuses on the lives of Indian independence activists incarcerated in the Cellular Jail (or Kālāpānī) in Andaman and Nicobar Islands during the British Raj. The ensemble cast includes Mohanlal, Prabhu, Tabu, Amrish Puri, Tinnu Anand, Nedumudi Venu, Sreenivasan, Annu Kapoor, Alex Draper, Sankaradi, and Vineeth. The film was produced by Mohanlal for Pranavam Arts in association with R. Mohan's Shogun Films.

The film is about the lives of prisoners in British India who are brought to Kālā Pānī. The name Kalapani is derived from the mode of imprisonment in British India. Ilaiyaraaja composed the music, the cinematography was by Santosh Sivan, and the editing by N. Gopalakrishnan. The film introduced Dolby Stereo into Malayalam cinema. It was made on a budget of ₹2.50 crore, making it the costliest Malayalam film made until then.

Kaalapaani was released on 6 April 1996 in 450 theaters worldwide, which was the largest release for any Indian film until then. The film is now regarded as one of the classics in Malayalam cinema. Originally made in Malayalam, the film was dubbed and released in Hindi as Saaza-E-Kaalapani, Tamil as Siraichalai, and in Telugu as Kaala Pani. Amitabh Bachchan bought the Hindi dubbing rights, besides narrating the prologue for the Hindi version. The film won four National Film Awards, including the awards for Best Art Direction (Sabu Cyril), Best Special Effects (S. T. Venky), and Best Cinematography (Santosh Sivan). The film also won seven Kerala State Film Awards.

== Plot ==
In 1965, G. S. Sethu of the Indian Army goes to Ross Island, Kaalapaani, to find the whereabouts of his aunt Parvathi's husband Govardhan Menon, who had been sent to jail in 1916 during the period of British rule. In an old room containing records of prisoners held at the jail, Sethu comes across Govardhan's records and learns his story.

In 1915, Govardhan, a doctor and Indian nationalist, is wrongly accused of bombing a train carrying 55 people, including British officials. On his wedding day with Parvathi, he is deported to the Cellular Jail at Port Blair, Andaman and Nicobar Islands, which is called Kaalapaani by the prisoners living there. There, hundreds of Indian prisoners are incarcerated in the Cellular Jail, including leading participants of the independence movement. David Berry is a sadistic jailor who is of Irish descent, while Len Hutton is a kindhearted English doctor. Savarkar is incarcerated and tries his best to keep the spirit of the prisoners going despite unbelievable torture.

The prisoners are often forced to perform harsh labour outside the jail, including quarrying and mining work where explosives are used to break rocks. During one such work assignment involving the transport of mining explosives, Mukundan, Govardhan's friend, seizes an opportunity to create a detonation to escape amid the confusion and flee from the guards. Govardhan chases Mukundan to stop his escape. They manage to steal a small boat and drift across the sea, eventually reaching North Sentinel Island. Unaware of the dangers posed by the isolated island inhabited by the Sentinelese tribe, they struggle to survive there for a brief period while hiding from British patrols. When British forces begin searching the surrounding waters, Govardhan decides to surrender, believing that continued resistance would lead to their deaths and harsher reprisals against other prisoners. Mukundan resists the idea of surrender and attempts to evade capture, but eventually both are taken into custody by the British authorities and brought back to the cellular jail, where they are subjected to even harsher punishment for their escape attempt.

A meticulous plan to escape from jail is formed by 40 prisoners under the leadership of three people. However, Moosa, aka Kanaran, reports the matter to the British authorities. The court orders the three leaders to be hanged until death and the others to be punished in a minor fashion. However, as per the order of Mirza Khan, the other people are also shot to death. Parvathi keeps waiting for Govardhan to come back. Due to Len's efforts, the government decides to investigate the matter of the torture meted out to the prisoners. Fourteen people are ordered to be released. One of them is Mukundan. David and the jail warden Mirza Khan hatch a plan to incite a prison riot and shoot down 13 prisoners while they are escaping. Mukundan refuses to escape and is taken on the pretext of meeting the Chief Commissioner, and is shot and killed. Seeing Mukundan's dead body, Govardhan throws down David from one of the towers and kills Mirza Khan by strangling him. Govardhan is hanged to death. All this is shown in intermittent flashbacks. Sethu, after knowing Govardhan had already been hanged to death 45 years ago, decides not to tell the truth to his aunt as her wait of 50 years would have been in vain. The film ends with Sethu lying to her that he met Govardhan and talked to him about her, indicating she will never come to know about Govardhan's death and will keep waiting for him for the rest of her life.

== Cast ==
- Mohanlal as Dr. Govardhan Menon / Unni
- Prabhu as Mukundan Iyengar, a Tamil revolutionary who wanted to avenge British officer Barrington for killing locals.
- Tabu as Parvathikutty, Dr.Govardhan's lover-turned-wife
- Amrish Puri as Mirza Khan, an Afghan jailer who is a companion of David Barrie
- Tinnu Anand as Ram Lakhan, a Hindu prisoner who was tortured by force feeding non-vegetarian food and human faeces
- Vineeth as G. Sethu, Dr. Govardhan's nephew, who is in the Indian Army
- Alex Draper as Jailer David Barrie, a sadist and cruel jailer in Kalapani.
- John Kolvenbach as Dr. Len Hutton, a kind-hearted doctor.
- Annu Kapoor as Vinayak Damodar Savarkar, the leader of the prisoners who demanded better treatment and rights for the prisoners
- Sankaradi as Kunju Muhammad Musaliar, an influential Muslim prisoner who advocated for Hindu-Muslim unity
- Nedumudi Venu as Sreekandan Nair, Govardhan's maternal uncle, who was a local chieftain and a loyalist to the British Rule
- Delhi Ganesh as Pandiyan, a prisoner who had done many nationalistic activities and attempted to escape from prison; he was later sentenced to death.
- Sreenivasan as Moosa aka Kannaran, a prisoner and a spy of Mirza Khan who instigated communal riots in the prison
- Cochin Haneefa as Ahmed Kutty, a kind-hearted and patriotic guard in the jail
- Maniyanpilla Raju as Nair, an official in the Andaman & Nicobar administration of independent India
- Govind Menon as Parmanand, a prisoner
- S. R. Veeraraghavan as Achyuthan, a prisoner
- Sreenath as Satyasheelan, a Prisoner
- Ajayan Adoor as a Prisoner
- Suma Jayaram as Sreekandan Nair's daughter, who was jealous of Parvathi falling in love with Govardhan
- Tom Alter as British Chief Commissioner of the Andaman and Nicobar Islands Province
- Kozhikode Narayanan Nair as Naanu Nair, Parvathi's father, and Sreekandan Nair's assistant
- Poojappura Ravi as Nampoothiri, who wanted to marry Parvathi
- Antony Perumbavoor as Mukundan's friend and accomplice
- Poornam Vishwanathan as Mukundan's father
- Kanya Bharathi as Mukundan's sister

== Production ==
=== Development ===
Director Priyadarshan co-wrote the screenplay with screenwriter T. Damodaran. The basis for the story was existing accounts of life in Cellular Jail, particularly excerpts from biographies of political leaders of the Indian Independence Movement. Most of these excerpts covered the ruthless routine of prisoners in jail, under the command of Jailer David Barry, Major James Pattinson Walker and Petty officer Mirza Khan.

=== Pre-production ===
While the Pre-World War I ports were recreated on the Andaman Islands, several huge sets were built on a 1.5-acre space in Murugalaya Studio, Chennai to replicate the Cellular Jail. In Madras, the sets of the Cellular Jail cost about Rs 12 lakh to build on 1.5 acres at the Murugalaya Studio. Apparently, director Priyadarshan was adamant and determined to be faithful to the details of the era. He said, "The Andamans had not seen a horse in 20 years. We had to carry four horses there at a cost of about Rs 3 lakh. When the filming was over, we presented them to the Andamans administration." Before the making of the film, Prabhu had injured his knee and, during his recovery phase, put on considerable weight. To accommodate his physique in the script, Priyadarshan altered the character by depicting him as a constant eater.

=== Filming ===
The budget of the film, ₹2.5 crore (equivalent to ₹15 crore or US$1.5 million in 2026), was much larger than the average ₹1 crore for a Malayalam film at the time. The shooting was completed in 72 days at Andaman and Nicobar Islands, several parts of Kerala and Chennai. Post-production took more than four months to complete. Composer Ilaiyaraaja completed his symphonic score in 16 days; audiographer Deepan Chatterji completed the sound design and mix in 90 days. This is the first Malayalam film to recorded in Dolby Stereo. The film is shot in the Malayalam language. However, numerous portions contain dialogues in Hindi, English, Tamil, Bengali, Telugu, and German.

== Soundtrack ==
Kaalapani

Soundtrack album by Ilaiyaraaja
- Released: 5 March 1996
- Recorded: 1995–1996
- Studio: Prasad Studios
- Genre: Feature film soundtrack
- Length: 27:08
- Labels: Johny Sagariga (Malayalam); Music Master (Tamil); ABCL (Hindi); Sitara (Telugu)
- Producer: Ilaiyaraaja

Ilaiyaraaja chronology
Thedi Vandha Raasa (1995)	Kaalapani (1996)	Nammoora Mandara Hoove (1996)

The music was composed and conducted by Ilaiyaraaja. K. S. Chithra was the only female singer in all the versions, while male singers kept changing from version to version.

Track list

All lyrics are written by Gireesh Puthenchery, except where noted.

Malayalam (Original Motion Picture Soundtrack)
No.	Title	Lyrics	Artist(s)	Length
1.	"Aattirambile Kombile"		M. G. Sreekumar, K. S. Chithra	5:01
2.	"Chempoove Poove"		M. G. Sreekumar, K. S. Chithra	4:59
3.	"Kottum Kuzhal Vizhi"		M. G. Sreekumar, K. S. Chithra, Chorus	5:43
4.	"Marikkoodinullil"		K. S. Chithra, Ilaiyaraaja	5:07
5.	"Vande Mataram"	Javed Akhtar	Choir	6:06

All lyrics are written by Arivumathi.

Tamil (dubbed version)
No.	Title	Artist(s)	Length
1.	"Alolam Kili Thopilae"	S. P. Balasubrahmanyam, K. S. Chithra	5:01
2.	"Suttum Sudar Vizhi"	M. G. Sreekumar, K. S. Chithra, Chorus	5:43
3.	"Sempoove Poove"	S. P. Balasubrahmanyam, K. S. Chithra	4:59
4.	"Mannan Koorai Chelai"	K. S. Chithra, Gangai Amaran	5:07
5.	"Ithu Thaai Pirandha"	Mano, Choir	6:06

All lyrics are written by P. K. Mishra, except where noted.

Hindi (dubbed version)
No.	Title	Lyrics	Artist(s)	Length
1.	"Zindagi Mein Tum Mile"		Hariharan, K. S. Chithra	5:01
2.	"Bachpan Ke Saathi Mere"		Hariharan, K. S. Chithra, Choir	5:43
3.	"Sandhya Ki Laali"		M. G. Sreekumar, K. S. Chithra	4:59
4.	"Baaghon Ki Bahaarein"		K. S. Chithra, M. G. Sreekumar	5:07
5.	"Vande Mataram"	Javed Akhtar	Mano, Choir	6:06

Telugu (dubbed version)
No.	Title	Lyrics	Artist(s)	Length
1.	"Chaamanthi Poove"		S. P. Balasubrahmanyam, K. S. Chithra	4:59
2.	"Kannekommana"		S. P. Balasubrahmanyam, K. S. Chithra	5:01
3.	"Mojullona"		K. S. Chithra	5:07
4.	"Vande Mataram"	Javed Akhtar	Mano, Choir	6:06
5.	"Yakshakanne"		S. P. Balasubrahmanyam, K. S. Chithra, Choir	5:43

== Reception ==
On 31 May 1996, P. S. Joseph from India Today wrote, "This ambitious venture by a director known for his comedies in Malayalam, and some competent films in Bollywood like – Muskurahat (1992) and Gardish (1993), does not carry the impact it ought to. Despite its flashes of brilliance and exceptional photography, and a Rs 3.10 crore budget – the largest ever for a Malayalam film – Kaalapaani does not linger in the memory after you leave the cinema hall." However, he praised Sabu Cyril's art direction calling it "exceptional" and Amrish Puri's performance writing, "The redeeming feature is Amrish Puri – the inimitable actor with a menacing voice and remarkable screen presence. He walks tall in the prison, epitomising the brutality and viciousness of the British Raj." Kalki, reviewing the Tamil dubbed version Siraichalai, praised the performance of Mohanlal but felt Prabhu was wasted while also criticising modern wardrobe choices for a periodic subject and concluded a film that should have reached international standards like Schindler's List, in the course of the story, nationalism is beaten, Prabhu-Mohanlal friendship, division and tragedy hence revenge thus becoming ordinary fare. D. S. Ramanujam of The Hindu reviewing Tamil version wrote "To make a film on pre-Independence days, particularly about the dark deeds of the British and their lackeys manning the notorious Andaman prison is a formidable task. It calls for meticulous planning to capture the mood of that period right from the costume, arms and ammunition, locations, and other details. Director Priyadarshan can be really proud of the outcome in Kalaipuli International's Chiraichalai, which is a rare movie exceptionally good in all departments of film production".

== Accolades ==
National Film Awards 1995

- Best Art Direction – Sabu Cyril
- Best Cinematography – Santosh Sivan
- Best Audiography – Deepan Chatterji
- Best Special Effects – S. T. Venky

Kerala State Film Awards

- Second Best Film – Mohanlal (producer), R. Mohan (co-producer)
- Best Actor – Mohanlal
- Best Cinematography – Santosh Sivan
- Best Art Director – Sabu Cyril
- Best Music Director – Ilaiyaraaja
- Best Processing Lab – Gemini Colour Lab
- Best Costume Designer – Sajin Raghavan
