= Poovukkul =

Song by A. R. Rahman featuring P. Unnikrishnan and Sujatha Mohan

from the album Jeans: The Original Motion Picture Soundtrack
- Released: 9 March 1998
- Studio: Panchathan Record Inn and AM Studios
- Venue: Chennai
- Genre: Film Soundtrack
- Length: 6:48
- Label: West Top (Tamil); New Music (Tamil); Saregama (Tamil); T-Series (Hindi); Aditya Music (Telugu)
- Composer: A. R. Rahman
- Lyricist: Vairamuthu
- Producer: A. R. Rahman

"Poovukkul" is a song, sung in Tamil, featured in the 1998 Tamil film Jeans. The song was written by the film's noted musical duo, composer A. R. Rahman and lyricist Vairamuthu. Tamil and Telugu version of this song was performed by P. Unnikrishnan and Sujatha Mohan, while Hariharan and Sadhana Sargam sung the Hindi version.

Set in six countries, the music video of "Poovukkul" features Tamil actor Prashanth and actress Aishwarya Rai, a previous Miss World winner. The lyrics of the song compare Rai as a wonder of the world, citing that she is the "eighth wonder of the world". The song was dubbed in Telugu and Hindi as "Poovullo Daagunna" and "Ajooba", respectively. Hindi lyrics was penned by Javed Akhter. Telugu lyrics was penned by A. M. Rathnam and Sivaganesh.

== Production ==
The team for the song visited several countries to picturize the song "Poovukul", which featured scenes with seven famous buildings, dubbing Aishwarya Rai as the "eighth wonder of the world". Shankar admitted that due to no real list being present, thought had been put into which wonders were selected. The team made a thirty-day trip around the world stopping to can scenes at the Leaning Tower of Pisa, the Colosseum, the Empire State Building, the Great Wall of China, the Taj Mahal, the Egyptian pyramids, and the Eiffel Tower. The death of Princess Diana had delayed filming in France for the Paris schedule. The costumes for the song were designed by Aneez Jeeva and Anu Parthasarathy.

The first part of the song was shot in Paris, France. Later filming moved to Rome and Pisa in Italy. Thirdly in New York City, United States, then to Giza, Egypt, and on to Great Wall of China and lastly at Taj Mahal in India. For the most part, Jeans was surrounded by world events of varying sorts and for Shankar, the cast and crew of the film described the experiences as "tremendously vivid and memorable".
