= Jeans (film) =

1998 Indian film by Shankar

- Film poster
- Directed by: Shankar
- Screenplay by: Shankar
- Story by: Shankar
- Dialogues by: Balakumaran
- Produced by: Ashok Amritraj; Dr. Murali Manohar
- Starring: Prashanth; Aishwarya Rai
- Cinematography: Ashok Kumar
- Visual effects by: S. T. Venki; V. Srinivas Mohan
- Edited by: B. Lenin; V. T. Vijayan
- Music by: A. R. Rahman
- Production company: Amritraj Solomon Communications
- Release date: 24 April 1998
- Running time: 172 minutes
- Country: India
- Language: Tamil
- Budget: ₹20 crore

Jeans is a 1998 Indian Tamil-language romantic comedy film written and directed by Shankar, and produced by Ashok Amritraj and Murali Manohar. The film stars Prashanth and Aishwarya Rai in the lead roles, while Lakshmi, Radhika Sarathkumar, Nassar, Senthil and Raju Sundaram play supporting roles. The background score and soundtrack were composed by A. R. Rahman , while Ashok Kumar and the duo B. Lenin and V. T. Vijayan handled the cinematography and editing, respectively.

Jeans released on 24 April 1998 and was the most expensive film to be made in Indian cinema at that time. The film won four Tamil Nadu State Film Awards, the Filmfare Award for Best Music Director – Tamil (Rahman) and the National Film Award for Best Special Effects. It was also India's official submission for the Academy Award for Best Foreign Language Film.

== Plot ==
Nachiappan is a wealthy, widowed Indian-American restaurateur based in Los Angeles. He has identical twin sons, Viswanathan ("Visu") and Ramamoorthy ("Ramu"), who are exemplary medical students and spend their evenings assisting at their father's establishment alongside chief cook Juno. One evening at the airport, Visu encounters a visiting Tamil family from Chennai: Madhumitha ("Madhu"), her younger brother Madhesh, and their grandmother Krishnaveni, struggling with immigration authorities. Visu intervenes to assist them and learns they have traveled to the United States so Krishnaveni can undergo surgery for a brain tumor. After a series of identity confusions involving Ramu, the twins safely guide the family to their destination.

Krishnaveni is admitted to the hospital where Visu serves as a resident doctor. Following her surgery, Visu discovers a catastrophic medical error: the surgeons operated on the wrong side of her brain due to a patient mix-up, leaving her temporarily paralyzed. He aggressively confronts the hospital administration, secures a corrective operation, and launches a fierce campaign for legal compensation. To avoid a high-profile lawsuit, the hospital awards Krishnaveni a US$2 million settlement. Deeply moved by Visu's chivalry and dedication, Madhu falls in love with him.

Krishnaveni notices their mutual affection and extends the family's American stay by feigning persistent headaches. However, when the romance is brought to light, Nachiappan vehemently objects; he harbors a strict obsession that his identical twin sons must only marry identical twin daughters. In a flashback, it is revealed that Nachiappan has an identical twin brother named Pechiappan, a meek simpleton living in Karaikudi, India. In their youth, both married for love. However, Pechiappan’s volatile wife, Sundarambal, severely abused Nachiappan's pregnant wife, Meiyaththa, leading to her tragic death immediately after giving birth to Visu and Ramu. To prevent his brother's marriage from fracturing over the tragedy, Nachiappan took his infants and migrated to America.

Desperate to salvage the alliance, Krishnaveni fabricates a lie, convincing Nachiappan that Madhu has an identical twin sister named Vaishnavi who was raised separately in an orthodox Brahmin household due to a superstitious belief that raising the twins would invite misfortune. Enticed by the prospect, Nachiappan takes his family to India to arrange a double wedding. Krishnaveni forces Madhu to secretly alternate as Vaishnavi, playing her as a highly demure and traditional woman. Ramu instantly falls in love with the fictional persona, entirely unaware of the deception.

Meanwhile, back in India, Pechiappan attempts suicide because his marriage has deteriorated due to Sundarambal’s infertility. Nachiappan rescues him and hatches a plan to rehabilitate his brother's life while keeping the wedding arrangements on track. The twins swap identities: Nachiappan travels to Karaikudi pretending to be Pechiappan, using his sharp business acumen to save his brother's failing restaurant and successfully reform Sundarambal's bitter attitude. Conversely, the mild-mannered Pechiappan stays in Chennai pretending to be Nachiappan.

Eventually, guilt consumes Madhu. Realizing that Ramu is deeply in love with an alter ego who does not exist, she decides to halt the masquerade. Concurrently, Visu uncovers the truth independently. Enraged by the elaborate deception, Visu aggressively breaks off the engagement. However, the good-natured Ramu convinces Visu that Madhu lied purely out of love and urges him to reconcile. Ramu then persuades his supposed father, unaware that it is actually his uncle Pechiappan, to officially sanction the marriage between Visu and Madhu.

When the real Nachiappan discovers the unauthorized wedding arrangements, he rushes to Chennai with a reformed Sundarambal to halt the ceremony. At the venue, the structural identity swaps are finally exposed to both households. Sundarambal steps forward to defend the young couple, convincing Nachiappan that Madhu's deceptive masquerade was driven by the exact same selflessness that prompted the brothers to swap lives for their family's happiness. Moved by her reasoning, Nachiappan yields and blesses the union. The film concludes at the wedding reception, where Madhesh entertains the reconciled family with advanced computer-generated digital imagery.

== Cast ==
- Prashanth in a dual role as
  - Viswanathan
  - Ramamoorthy
- Aishwarya Rai (voice: Savitha) as Madhumitha/Vaishnavi (fake twin)
- Lakshmi as Krishnaveni
- Radhika as Sundarambal
- Nassar in a dual role as
  - Nachiappan
  - Pechiappan
- Senthil as Juno
- S. V. Shekhar as Vellaiappan
- Raju Sundaram as Madhesh
- Geetha as Meiyaththa (Guest appearance)
- Gandhimathi as Visalakshi
- Janaki Sabesh as Durga
- S. N. Lakshmi as Deivatha
- Ram Ramachandran as Sivasu

== Production ==
=== Development ===
Made on a then-record budget of ₹20 crore (equivalent to ₹98 crore or US$10 million in 2026), the film was completed in a year and a half. Jeans, unlike Shankar's other films, was the first to be shot outside of India for major portions of the film. The producers of the film were Ashok Amritraj and J. Murali Manohar, both of whom made their Tamil film debuts with Jeans. Amritraj did not work on any Tamil film afterwards. The film reunited Shankar with his award-winning technical crew from his previous film Indian, whilst the cast was finalised by him after he had completed the story.

A difference of opinion exists regarding how the film got its name. According to Amritraj, the title Jeans was selected due to being a homophone of "genes", and "seem[ed] very appropriate to the movie", while Shankar said, "Young people are associated with denim wear and so Jeans is an apt title".

The film's launch was held at the AVM Studios in Vadapalani, Chennai in December 1996. The Jeans invitation was printed, wrapped in denim and hand-delivered by Shankar to his close colleagues and friends in Chennai, which included prominent actors in the Tamil film industry. The cast and crew of the film wore their favourite pair of blue jeans to the launch, as requested by the film's producers.

=== Casting ===
The original actor considered for the dual roles of Viswanathan and Ramamoorthy was Abbas, who opted out due to call sheet problems. The role eventually went to Prashanth, who sacrificed seven films in the process, and chose to work exclusively on the project during the period. Aishwarya Rai, Miss World 1994, was the next choice for the roles of Madhumitha and Vaishnavi and collaborated with Shankar after she had been unable to work with him in his previous venture Indian. Rai initially attempted to dub in her own voice, but was later dubbed over by Savitha Radhakrishnan. Initially, the team approached actress Sridevi for the roles of Madhumitha and Vaishnavi but eventually walked off due to busy shooting schedules. The supporting cast included Senthil and Raju Sundaram, with the latter making his debut as an actor. Prominent supporting actresses Lakshmi and Radhika were signed up for the film, whilst Geetha agreed to appear in a guest appearance. Another supporting role was taken by S. Ve. Sekhar after playback singer S. P. Balasubrahmanyam opted out of the role. Shankar wanted Goundamani to appear in a dual role, but due to the actor's unavailability, the genre of the film was changed from comedy to romance; the roles offered to Goundamani went to Nassar.

The other substitution in the project involved the cinematographer. Despite reports that Shankar would again sign-on Jeeva, whom he had worked within Kaadhalan, Gentleman and Indian, Santhosh Sivan was announced as the cinematographer for the film. Though between the time of the announcement and the finishing stages of the film, cinematographer Ashok Kumar was publicised as the official cinematographer for the film. In mid-1997, the Film Employees Federation of South India (FEFSI) went on strike and in the midst of this, the film's art director Thota Tharani, a FEFSI supporter, refused to sacrifice his position in FEFSI and stopped working in Jeans. Without much choice, Shankar signed a newcomer Bala to take over the set design and artwork for the film. The film's art direction is credited to both Thota Tharani and Bala. S. T. Venky was signed up to deal with the special effects in the film, with Jeans. The film also was assisted in graphics effects created by Pentafour Software.

=== Filming ===
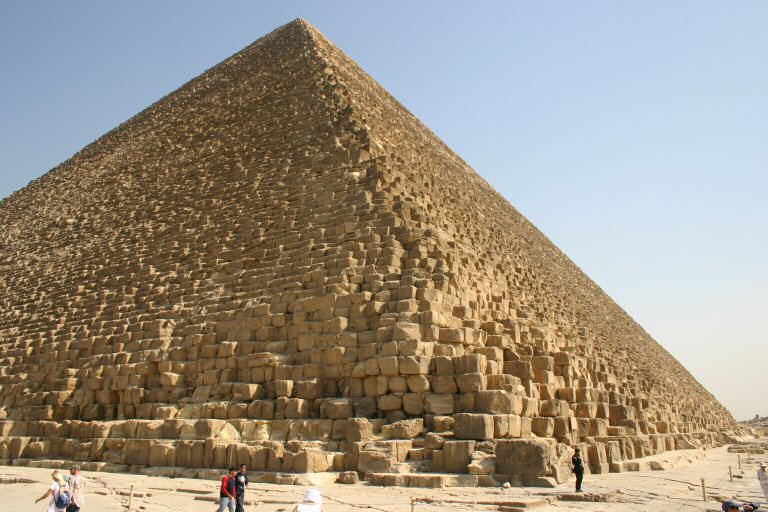
The Great Pyramid of Giza, one of the Seven Wonders of the Ancient World seen in the film

The actual present scenes of the story are filmed in United States and few Tamil Nadu cities especially in Chennai, Karaikudi and Madurai. the fantasy song scenes set in the United States, the team toured various American cities with a tour party of 35 technicians, including eight from Hollywood. The initial scenes of the Nachiyappan family's catering company were filmed in Las Vegas, whilst other scenes were shot in California at the Universal Studios, where the shooting of foreign films is usually not permitted. However, with influence from the film's producer Ashok Amritraj they were able to obtain special permission to film a few scenes inside. Besides the King Kong set, Jeans was also shot in the "simulated earthquake experience" sets.

The filming in Los Angeles received much publicity as well as the filming at the Grand Canyon in Arizona. Other Jeans shooting locations in the United States of America included the Valley of Fire, Manhattan Beach, Malibu Lake and many scenic spots throughout California. Scenes canned at the Los Angeles International Airport featured local actors as customs officers. The song "Columbus" was picturised at Mahabalipuram with a set to make it look like Venice Beach with some foreign dancers. The song was named after Christopher Columbus and was described as "a pastiche of MTV music videos and Baywatch". Shankar also filmed in New Jersey and New York City at the World Trade Center when co-producer Michael Salomon and his wife, Luciana Paluzzi visited the sets of Jeans. The subplot about a botched brain surgery was noted by some critics to have been inspired by a true incident involving actress Sridevi's mother, though the makers did not confirm this.

After a 45-day schedule in the United States, Shankar and the team returned to India to film a couple of scenes in the climax. The team then visited several other countries to picturise the song "Poovukkul", with featured scenes with seven prominent buildings in the world, dubbing Rai as the "eighth wonder of the world". Shankar admitted that due to no real list being present, thought had been put into which wonders were selected. The team made a thirty-day trip around the world stopping to can scenes at the Leaning Tower of Pisa, the Empire State Building, the Great Wall of China, the Taj Mahal, the Egyptian pyramids, the Colosseum and the Eiffel Tower. Prashanth's costumes for this song were designed by Anu Parthasarathy.

During the shooting in Paris, Diana, Princess of Wales had died and shooting was delayed as a result of her death. The team initially wanted to capture a top angle shot of the Statue of Liberty which got cancelled due to snowfalls in afternoon. For the song "Anbe Anbe", Kasi designed the costumes of Rai based on the paintings drawn by Raja Ravi Varma as suggested by Shankar. That song was shot on an elaborate set with hundreds of actors and according to Ashok Kumar, "Ten generators were put to use, and we did special lighting, deliberately exaggerating the reds, yellows and blues with fog and smoke effects". The body double of Aishawarya Rai that appears in the song "Kannodu Kanbathellam" was created by Pentamedia Graphics. Three weeks prior to the release of the film, on 1 April 1998 a screening was held labelled the Making of Jeans with prominent personalities invited; however, the short film showed the real manufacture of jeans courtesy of a company named Diana Garments. The prank was claimed by a Tamil journal who utilised an April Fools joke.

== Themes and influences ==
The concept of the lead actor playing multiple roles in the film was common in Tamil cinema with Rajinikanth doing so in Moondru Mugam (1982) and Kamal Haasan in some films. However, unlike those films, Jeans was regarded as an oddity in the sense that the conservative Ramamoorthy character was not well written and did not have a defined purpose.

== Soundtrack ==
The soundtrack of Jeans was composed by A. R. Rahman, with lyrics by Vairamuthu for all songs The song "Anbe Anbe" is set to the raga Kapi, "Kannodu Kanbathellam" is set to Abheri, "Poovukkul" is set to Sankarabharanam, and "Varayo Thozhi" is set to Mohanam. The audio launch took place in March 1998. To make the audio cassettes more "elegant and memorable", cassette store owners were told to wrap the cassettes in jeans clothing before giving them to customers.

All lyrics are written by Vairamuthu.

Tamil Track listing
No.	Title	Singer(s)	Length
1.	"Enakke Enakka (Hairabba)"	Unnikrishnan, S. P. B. Pallavi	6:39
2.	"Columbus Columbus"	A. R. Rahman	4:29
3.	"Poovukkul Olinthirukkum (Adhisayam)"	Unnikrishnan, Sujatha Mohan	6:48
4.	"Kannodu Kaanbadhellam"	Nithyasree Mahadevan	4:52
5.	"Varayo Thozhi"	Sonu Nigam, Shahul Hameed, Harini, Sangeetha Rajeshwaran	5:46
6.	"Anbe Anbe"	Hariharan, Anuradha Sriram	5:06
7.	"Love Theme"	Harini, Anupama, Febi Mani	2:01
8.	"Punnagayil Thee Mooti"	Hariharan	2:27

All tracks are written by A. M. Rathnam and Siva Ganesh.

Telugu Track listing
No.	Title	Singer(s)	Length
1.	"Hayirabba"	P. Unnikrishnan, S. P. B. Pallavi	6:39
2.	"Columbus Columbus"	A. R. Rahman	4:29
3.	"Poovullo"	P. Unnikrishnan, Sujatha Mohan	6:48
4.	"Kannulatho Choseve"	Nithyasree Mahadevan	4:52
5.	"Raave Naa Chaliyaa"	Sonu Nigam, Shahul Hameed, Harini, Sangeetha Rajeshwaran	5:46
6.	"Priya Priya Champodde"	Srinivas	5:06
7.	"Gundello Gayanni"	Srinivas	2:27

All tracks are written by Javed Akhtar.

Hindi Track listing
No.	Title	Singer(s)	Length
1.	"Hai Rabba"	Udit Narayan, Kavita Krishnamurthy	6:39
2.	"Columbus Columbus"	Sonu Nigam, Raqueeb Alam	4:29
3.	"Ajooba"	Hariharan, Sadhana Sargam	6:48
4.	"Kehta Hai Mera"	Kavitha Krishnamurthy	4:52
5.	"Kehne Do Dadi"	Sonu Nigam, Kavita Paudwal, Sukhwinder Singh, Sangeetha	5:46
6.	"Tauba Tauba"	Hariharan, Anuradha Sriram	5:06

== Release ==
Jeans had a limited release on 14 April 1998, and a wide release on 24 April. With 240 prints, it holds the 1998 record for a Tamil film. The team also released 35 prints of the film in Malaysia, a record at the time. The film completed 100 days of screening in the theatres in the state of Tamil Nadu, and the Tamil version was commercially successful. Shankar later revealed that the film's box office performance improved with time. The film performed well in Malaysia, running for over 100 days in cinemas. The reason for the film's success was attributed to the Tamil Nadu government's ability to fight piracy. The film was dubbed in Telugu as Jeans and released on 9 May 1998, which was also commercially successful. The film was later dubbed that same year and released in Hindi under the same title, which unlike the Tamil and Telugu versions, bombed at the box office.

=== Critical reception ===
Rajitha from Rediff.com praised the characters of Prashanth, Aishwarya Rai and Nassar as "ever dependable", whilst singling out praise for Radhika whom she describes that " with her startling cameo, sweeps the acting honours". The reviewer praised the technical crew describing Venky's FX as a "virtual reality", Ashok Kumar's cinematography as "throughout and outstanding", Raju Sundaram's choreography as "memorable" and A. R. Rahman's score as "entirely hummable". Shankar's directorial attributes were described to be to a "perfect flow of narrative and a penchant for demanding and getting perfection out of every element of his cast and crew" and that the film was an "easy fit". V. Maheshwara Reddy of The Indian Express called the film a "hilarious comedy" and drew significant praise to the performance of Aishwarya Rai and the music of Rahman.

D. S. Ramanujam of The Hindu said, "Many historic landmarks in the world are captured, and director Shanker employs all these factors gainfully in Amritraj Solomon Communications' Jeans, but gives a go-by to the storyline (story and screenplay are also his)". VRR of Deccan Herald described the film as a "colossal waste", criticising Shankar's story and direction and the performances of Prashanth and Lakshmi. R. P. R. of Kalki wrote Shankar in this film may have understood how the story can get bogged down if there is too much desire to scare with grandeur and felt love between Prashanth and Aishwarya and relationship between brothers has been needlessly dragged though he praised Rahman's music; however he felt the cinematographer failed to capture locations thrillingly.

Regarding the Telugu dubbed version, Giddaluri Gopalrao of Zamin Ryot wrote that with all of the special features and full commercial value, this film is diverse, quirky and entertaining. A critic from Andhra Today wrote, "Had it been supported by a good story, it would have been a great movie".

=== Accolades ===
Jeans was submitted by India as its entry for the Best Foreign Language Film for the 71st Academy Awards, but did not make the final shortlist. The decision to submit Jeans met with widespread criticism as it was seen as a populist film. The film won four Tamil Nadu State Film Awards: Best Comedian (Senthil), Best Female Playback Singer (Nithyasree Mahadevan), Best Choreographer (Raju Sundaram) and Best Costume Designer (Kasi). It also won the Filmfare Award for Best Music Director – Tamil (Rahman), and the National Film Award for Best Special Effects.

== Possible sequel ==
In November 2013, Prashanth announced that he had registered the title Jeans 2 and was completing the pre-production works of a sequel to the 1998 film. The film was set to be directed and produced by Prashanth's father Thiagarajan, who revealed that production would begin in May 2014 and that they were trying to bring members of the original team back for the venture. In January 2014, Ashok Amritraj stated that he was not involved in the sequel and questioned the viability of the project, citing that he did not believe that Prashanth and his father had the rights to make a sequel. In February 2016, Prashanth reaffirmed that the sequel was in development.

== See also ==
- List of submissions to the 71st Academy Awards for Best Foreign Language Film

== Bibliography ==
- Sundararaman (2007) [2005]. Raga Chintamani: A Guide to Carnatic Ragas Through Tamil Film Music (2nd ed.). Pichhamal Chintamani. OCLC 295034757.
