= Nayak: The Real Hero =

2001 Indian film by Shankar

- Theatrical release poster
- Directed by: Shankar
- Written by: Shankar; Dialogues by Anurag Kashyap
- Based on: Mudhalvan by S. Shankar
- Produced by: A. M. Rathnam
- Starring: Anil Kapoor; Rani Mukerji; Amrish Puri; Paresh Rawal; Surya
- Cinematography: K. V. Anand
- Edited by: B. Lenin; V. T. Vijayan
- Music by: A. R. Rahman
- Production company: Sri Surya Movies
- Release date: 7 September 2001
- Running time: 187 minutes
- Country: India
- Language: Hindi
- Budget: ₹21 crore
- Box office: ₹20.56 crore

Nayak: The Real Hero (/nɑːjək/ transl. Hero) is a 2001 Indian Hindi-language political thriller film co-written and directed by Shankar (in his Bollywood debut) and produced by A. M. Rathnam under the Sri Surya Movies banner. The film stars Anil Kapoor, with Rani Mukerji, Amrish Puri, Paresh Rawal, and Johnny Lever playing supporting roles. A remake of Shankar's 1999 Tamil-language film Mudhalvan, it focuses on Shivaji Rao (Kapoor), a television cameraman and, later, television presenter, who accidentally hears and records a conversation between the police and the Chief Minister of Maharashtra Balraj Chauhan. While interviewing Chauhan about the issues, Shivaji is challenged to take over the chief minister's job for a day.

Nayak was announced in June 2000 and marked the first Hindi-language directorial venture of Shankar. The soundtrack was composed by A. R. Rahman, with lyrics that were written by Anand Bakshi. Filming was done by K. V. Anand, taking place in more than 100 locations across India.

The film was released on 7 September 2001 to mixed reviews from the critics, some of whom applauded the storyline, the performances (particularly Kapoor, Puri and Rawal), Shankar's direction and the themes and social message but criticised its lengthy duration, editing, pace and special effects. It was considered a commercial failure, grossing ₹20.56 crore (US$2.2 million) at the box-office against the total production and marketing cost of ₹21 crore (US$2.2 million).

Although Nayak was a commercial failure at the time of its theatrical release, it later gained significant popularity on television and has since become a cult classic.

== Plot ==
Shivaji Rao is an ambitious television cameraman, working for QTV along with his friend Topi in Mumbai, Maharashtra. While on his job, he is assigned to record riots triggered by a fight between college students and a bus driver and accidentally records a conversation in which Chief Minister Balraj Chauhan takes an indifferent stand, so as not to lose his voter base. In the riots, Shivaji saves the life of one of the college students there, and it is recorded by Topi. Because of his actions, Shivaji is promoted to senior television presenter.

Meanwhile, due to police inaction, there is loss of life and damage to property. Explaining his actions, Chauhan later agrees to do a live interview with Shivaji, during which Shivaji raises these issues and broadcasts the conversation he has recorded. In response to Shivaji's allegations about the mismanagement by his government, Chauhan redirects the question by saying that his job is not easy. He challenges Shivaji to be the Chief Minister for a day to experience those problems himself. Shivaji reluctantly accepts the challenge.

An ordinance is passed in the Maharashtra Legislative Assembly and Shivaji takes over as CM. Assisted by Bansal, Shivaji handles issues that affect the populace every day. He manages affordable housing and employment for the needy, and he suspends inefficient and corrupt government officials. As the last act of the day, Shivaji has Chauhan arrested, as the latter is the root cause of all the corruption. Later, Chauhan posts bail after assuming back as CM and leaves jail, then passes an ordinance to nullify all orders passed by Shivaji. Insulted by Shivaji's success as well, Chauhan sends assassins after him, but they only manage to destroy his house.

Meanwhile, Shivaji falls in love with Manjari, a naïve, carefree villager whom he met when he was a cameraman. He asks her father to marry her, but her father refuses on the grounds that Shivaji is not employed by the government. As a result, he begins preparing for the Civil Services Examination. However, Bansal arrives and informs him that his popularity has skyrocketed and that people want him to become the next Chief Minister. He is reluctant at first, but when Chauhan's henchmen vandalise QTV premises to intimidate him, and the people show their support by thronging to his place in huge numbers, he agrees to do so.

Across the ensuing state elections, Shivaji wins by a landslide. Chauhan's political allies desert him, causing his defeat. Manjari's father, angered by Shivaji's decision because he believes that it will render Shivaji careless towards Manjari and is too risky a job for him, refuses to let his daughter marry him. On becoming the Chief Minister, Shivaji effects many improvements and quickly becomes an idol in the people's eyes. However, his growing popularity is threatened continuously by Chauhan who uses his henchmen to try to kill him or tarnish his image as a public hero. After a failed attempt on Shivaji's life by hiring an assassin, a bomb is detonated at his home, killing his parents.

In a final attempt, Chauhan orders Pandurang to cause bomb explosions in various parts of the city. Accidentally, a priest hears that a few men are planning to detonate bombs and notifies Sivaji's office via the "complaint box", which was created by Shivaji to collect letters from the public about their complaints. Pandurang is arrested and, under tactical inquiry by Shivaji and Bansal, discloses the location of the four bombs.

A squad is able to defuse three bombs, but the fourth explodes—without injuring anyone—before they could reach it. Chauhan uses this success against Shivaji by blaming him for the bomb. Seeing no way out, Shivaji summons Chauhan to the secretariat and creates a situation such that it would seem as if Chauhan was there to assassinate Shivaji but failed.

To do so, Shivaji takes up a gun, points it to his left arm, shoots himself on purpose, and then hands over the gun to Chauhan his shootout. Enraged, Chauhan attempts to shoot Shivaji, but his shot misses. The security guards gun down Chauhan and kill him. Later on, Shivaji laments to Bansal that he has finally become a politician, but Bansal calms him, revealing that Chauhan deserved what he wanted.

Apart from that, Manjari's father also comes to realise that Shivaji is a great man who sees duty before everything else and allows Manjari to marry him. The film ends with the state developing under the governance of Shivaji.

== Cast ==
- Anil Kapoor as Shivaji Rao, a TV reporter and later Chief Minister of Maharashtra
- Rani Mukerji as Manjari Ghatge
- Amrish Puri as Balraj Chauhan, corrupt ex-Chief Minister of Maharashtra
- Paresh Rawal as Mr. Bansal, Secretary to the Chief Minister
- Johnny Lever as Topi, Shivaji's cameraman
- Pooja Batra as Laila, Shivaji's fellow reporter
- Saurabh Shukla as Pandurang, Chauhan's aide
- Shivaji Satam as Mr. Ghatge
- Raja Krishnamoorthy "Kitty" as Bhim Rao (voiced by Vikram Gokhale)
- Neena Kulkarni as Mrs. Rao, Shivaji's mother
- Rana Jung Bahadur as Kumar Vishal
- Anupam Shyam as Hemant Mishra, revenue minister
- Razak Khan as Topi's father-in-law
- Ponnambalam as Ranga (voiced by Manoj Pandey)
- Laxmi Ratten as the managing director
- Surya as Manohar, Shivaji's chief security officer
- Khyati Keswani as college girl
- Babu Antony as the sniper (guest appearance)
- Omakuchi Narasimhan as Viru Bhatia

The uncredited roles include Sushmita Sen and Ahmed Khan, who made special appearances in the song "Shakalaka Baby" and Boys Rajan who plays a member of the Desh Seva political party.

== Production ==
"Anil Kapoor is a very flexible kind of personality. He can play any kind of role—he can do, comedy, play the common man or a very stylish person, and on top of everything he is extremely mature. He lends himself to any kind of role. And he has done a good job."

— Shankar on the casting of Anil Kapoor

Nayak: The Real Hero serves as a remake of S. Shankar's 1999 Tamil-language film Mudhalvan, and was the director's first venture in Bollywood. The debut, announced in June 2000, was produced by A. M. Rathnam under the banner of Sri Surya Movies (his second Hindi film after that of Tejasvini, released in 1994), and addressed the issue of corruption in India. According to Shankar, he was motivated to remake Mudhalvan in Hindi because of its subject and did several changes to the original story. In an interview with Filmfare in August 2001, he said that he believed that the topic is well known among Indian people. Anurag Kashyap wrote the dialogue.

The role of Shivaji was originally going to be played by Aamir Khan, but Shankar did not cast him, explaining, "... the two of us faced a huge communication gap. His views about [Mudhalvan] didn't match mine." The next actor suggested was Shah Rukh Khan. However, he did not want to play the role after portraying a television presenter in his home production, Phir Bhi Dil Hai Hindustani (2000). Shankar's final choice was Anil Kapoor, although he was initially reluctant to choose him for the part but changed his mind after finding him more suitable than the previous actors, noting his discipline. When asked by the Deccan Herald about his character as well as his experience during the production of the film, Kapoor said that it was one of his career's finest roles and called it an honour to work with Shankar. To prepare for the role, Kapoor underwent physical training for six or seven months, and watched many talk shows hosted by Larry King, Prannoy Roy, Rajat Sharma, and Karan Thapar—later adopting their way of speaking. Nayak's character name was based on Rajinikanth's real life name—Shivaji Rao Gaekwad—because Shankar made the script for Mudhalvan with Rajinikanth in his mind. Kapoor also directed a scene featuring himself and Johnny Lever.

Shankar chose Rani Mukerji to fulfill the part of Manjari, a village girl who becomes the love interest of Kapoor's character. He cast Mukerji over Manisha Koirala, who played the role in the original version, as he thought that Mukerji has the bubbly image he needed for the character. Playing the type of role for the first time, the actress admitted that she saw resemblances between Manjari and herself, noting their vibrant along with uninhibited character, and described her collaboration with Kapoor as a "growing-up experience". Talking to a journalist from Rediff.com, Mukerji revealed that she immediately agreed to star in the film after hearing the story from Kapoor, which she felt was "mindblowing". Shankar wanted her to portray the role in her own way, not copying what Koirala had done before. Ahmed Khan and Sushmita Sen made special appearances in the film. Boys Rajan, who shot for a deleted scene in Mudhalvan, also acted in Nayak: The Real Hero, with Shankar assuring him that his scene will not be cut.

Principal photography was handled by K. V. Anand and took place in more than 100 locations in the states of Maharashtra, Tamil Nadu, Karnataka, Andhra Pradesh, Kerala, Rajasthan, and Himachal Pradesh. Thota Tharani served as the art director, while H. Sridhar was the sound designer. A 22-day schedule in Mumbai, Pune, and the cities in Tamil Nadu was started on 18 November 2000. To shoot the song "Shakalaka Baby", Anand travelled to the United States to meet the filmmaker Spike Lee and asked for his help. It was simultaneously shot with 34 cameras bought from the German manufacturer Arri with a speed of 100 FPS, instead of 24, and made the film over-budgeted; consequently, Anand spoke of his regret to do the idea. After filming ended, Nayak was edited by B. Lenin and V. T. Vijayan.

== Soundtrack ==
Nayak: The Real Hero

Soundtrack album by A. R. Rahman
- Released: 3 July 2001
- Genre: Feature film soundtrack
- Length: 38:33
- Labels: T-Series; Tips Industries
- Producer: A. R. Rahman

A. R. Rahman chronology
Lagaan (2001)	Nayak: The Real Hero (2001)	Love You Hamesha (2001)

The soundtrack for the film was composed by A. R. Rahman with lyrics from Anand Bakshi. The vocals were performed by Udit Narayan, Kavita Krishnamurthy, Vasundhara Das, Shiraz Uppal, Pravin Mani, Shankar Mahadevan, Alka Yagnik, Sunidhi Chauhan, Hans Raj Hans, Abhijeet Bhattacharya, Sanjeevani, and Hariharan. The soundtrack album was released at a special ceremony at the Hotel Regent in Mumbai under the label of T-Series, which bought the rights for ₹60 million (US$640,000). The album did not perform well commercially and, according to the film-trade website Box Office India, only 1.4 million units were sold. Except for new tracks "Saiyyan" and "Tu Achcha" replacing "Mudhalvane" and "Azhagana Ratchasiye", Rahman retained most of the songs from Mudhalvan.

Critically, the album was met with a poor reception from reviewers as well. Sukanya Verma of Rediff.com concluded that it was "quite a letdown" and "fails miserably", saying that she had expected more from Rahman. In an article for The Hindu, Savitha Gautham found the album has the same composition to that from Mudhalvan, but the lyrics are different. She noted that the songs have strong South Indian flavours, especially in "Saiyyan". Gautham declared "Shakalaka Baby" as the best song of the album, believing that it would be popular among Indian youth.

All lyrics are written by Anand Bakshi; all music is composed by A. R. Rahman.

Nayak (Original Motion Picture Soundtrack)
No.	Title	Singer(s)	Length
1.	"Chalo Chale Mitwa"	Udit Narayan, Kavita Krishnamurthy	6:41
2.	"Shakalaka Baby"	Vasundhara Das, Shiraz Uppal, Pravin Mani	5:27
3.	"Ruki Sukhi Roti"	Shankar Mahadevan, Alka Yagnik	5:39
4.	"Saiyyan"	Sunidhi Chauhan, Hans Raj Hans	6:14
5.	"Chidiya Tu Hoti To (Not in the film)"	Abhijeet Bhattacharya, Sanjeevani	5:49
6.	"Tu Achcha Lagta Hai"	Kavita Krishnamurthy, Hariharan	5:37
7.	"Chalo Chale Purva"	Kavita Krishnamurthy, Udit Narayan	3:06
Total length:			38:33

== Release ==
Originally scheduled for release on 15 August 2001, Nayak premiered at theatres on 7 September and failed to attract a large enough audience. Made on a production and marketing cost of ₹21 crore (US$2.2 million), the film opened on 280 screens across India and grossed ₹0.85 crore (US$91,000) on its first day. It collected ₹4.81 crore (US$510,000) after a week, and ₹18.06 crore (US$1.9 million) following its theatrical run in India. Abroad, the film also did not perform well and only had a total gross of $530,000. Summing the film's revenues from India and overseas, Box Office India estimated Nayak earned ₹20.56 crore (US$2.2 million). The film was released on DVD in the PAL widescreen format. Since 6 September 2019, the film is available for streaming on Amazon Prime Video.

== Critical response ==
Critics gave mixed reviews to Nayak, praising the performances of Kapoor and Puri from the first-half but panning the special effects, which they attributed to the film's commercial failure. Rediff.com's Sarita Tanwar wrote, "A fairly interesting plot, a commendable performance from the leading artiste, lavish production values and terrific pieces of action, Nayak: The Real Hero has all the ingredients that make a commercially viable film." Taran Adarsh from the entertainment portal Bollywood Hungama gave the film one star, calling its second-half "weak". However, he took note of the "superb" dialogue of the film, mostly that are said by Paresh Rawal's character, while deemed Johnny Lever's comedic scenes were "flat". Moreover, Adarsh said that Mukerji was given with a role that did not give her screen time to talk and Pooja Batra's role was better than hers. Saibal Chatterjee of the Hindustan Times, giving the same rating, described the film as "a patchwork that's neither pretty nor useful". Ziya Us Salam claimed that Kapoor portrayed his part with "easy professionalism".

The critic and trade analyst Komal Nahta opined that it did not "have enough entertainment value", suggesting that the film's lengthy duration could be cut for ten minutes. Kapoor's performance got appreciation from Nahta, who thought he was "splendid", otherwise Nahta hoped that Shankar's direction "could have been much better. His inept handling becomes conspicuous as unrealistic and unbelievable things happen in this serious issue-based drama." Writing for NDTV, Parul Batra saw that Mukerji was wasted in her brief role although applauding her costumes. He agreed with Nahta about the duration problem, saying that it left him "disappointed". Dinesh Raheja felt that the "spirited" performance of Kapoor was the highlight of the film, and Devesh Sharma, in a review carried by Screen, observed of him, "Anil Kapoor once again proves his brilliance as an actor with this movie [...] he verily gets under the skin of his character and executes a faultless performance. His frustrations, his angst and his heart-rendering lamentations on seeing his parents blown away find answering echoes in the heart of every cinegoer."

== Accolades ==
Award	Category	Recipient(s)	Result	Ref.
Bollywood Movie Awards	Most Sensational Actor	Anil Kapoor	Nominated	
Bollywood Movie Awards	Most Sensational Actress	Rani Mukerji	Nominated	
Screen Awards	Best Special Effects	S. T. Venky	Nominated	
Screen Awards	Best Action	Kanal Kannan	Nominated	

== Sequel ==
In September 2013, the media reported that Kapoor has signed to star in a sequel to Nayak, titled Nayak Returns. The project will have a different subject, but Kapoor has said that he will reprise his role. The sequel was officially announced later by Eros International in January 2017, with V. Vijayendra Prasad chosen to write the screenplay and the principal photography starting the same year. In early 2026, Anil Kapoor confirmed that the Nayak 2 is in development.

== See also ==
- Servant of the People (TV series) (2015–2019), Ukrainian comedy television series with similar concept, starring Volodymyr Zelenskyy
