= Kaadhalan =

1994 Indian film by Shankar

- Theatrical release poster
- Directed by: Shankar
- Screenplay by: Shankar
- Story by: Shankar; K. T. Kunjumon
- Dialogues by: Balakumaran
- Produced by: K. T. Kunjumon
- Starring: Prabhu Deva; Nagma
- Cinematography: Jeeva
- Edited by: B. Lenin; V. T. Vijayan
- Music by: A. R. Rahman
- Production company: A. R. S. Film International
- Release date: 17 September 1994
- Running time: 170 minutes
- Country: India
- Language: Tamil
- Budget: ₹3 crore

Kaadhalan (transl. Loverboy) is a 1994 Indian Tamil-language romantic thriller film directed by Shankar and produced by K. T. Kunjumon, who co-wrote the story. The film stars Prabhu Deva and Nagma (in her debut in Tamil cinema), alongside Vadivelu, Raghuvaran, Girish Karnad and S. P. Balasubrahmanyam. In the film, a college student falls in love with the daughter of the state governor, but soon becomes embroiled in a conspiracy involving the governor.

Kunjumon decided to collaborate with Shankar for the second time after the success of Gentleman (1993) and the story Shankar developed was that of a romance between an ordinary man and a wealthy girl; to increase the scale of the project, Kunjumon incorporated the cold-war between the then Chief Minister of Tamil Nadu J. Jayalalithaa and governor Marri Chenna Reddy into the script. The dialogues were written by Balakumaran, while the music was composed by A. R. Rahman. The cinematography was handled by Jeeva and editing by B. Lenin and V. T. Vijayan.

Kaadhalan was released on 17 September 1994 and became a major commercial success. The film earned several accolades, including two Filmfare Awards South and four National Film Awards.

== Plot ==
Kakarla Sathyanarayana, the Governor of Tamil Nadu, inaugurates a newly constructed open market in Madras. Moments after his departure, a devastating explosion tears through the complex. The bombing, orchestrated by a rogue explosives specialist named Mallikarjuna "Malli", plunges the state administration into political disarray.

Concurrently, Prabhu, a vibrant college student union chairman, and his close friend Vasanth, the joint secretary, secure Kakarla as the chief guest for their institution's annual day. During the event, Prabhu meets Kakarla's daughter, Shruti, and falls in love with her. In an effort to court her, he enrolls in her classical dance academy. Shruti initially resents his presence, viewing his casual attitude as an insult to the art form.

Following the pragmatic advice of his father, Kathiresan, a dedicated police constable, Prabhu strictly disciplines himself to master the traditional dance. After a month of rigorous training, his proficiency grows, yet a skeptical Shruti threatens to boycott the upcoming Natyanjali festival in Chidambaram if he attends. To prove his genuine dedication, Prabhu covertly enters her heavily guarded residence and delivers a flawless performance. Impressed, Shruti agrees to let him accompany her. However, Kakarla abruptly forbids his daughter from traveling, citing intelligence reports of a terrorist threat.

Unknown to the public, Kakarla is a corrupt operative working for the national ruling party, having accepted a massive bribe to destabilize the regional government. Rather than employing standard political horse-trading, Kakarla sought to manufacture severe law-and-order crises to justify invoking Article 356 of the Constitution of India, which allows the federal government to dismiss a state legislature. The market bombing was his initial strike, and he has already targeted the Chidambaram temple for a subsequent blast. Defiant, Shruti evades her security detail and escapes on a motorcycle with Prabhu and Vasanth. When Kakarla learns of her flight from his commando, Ajay, he panics and orders Malli to defuse the temple bomb. However, Malli suffers a debilitating road accident en route. During their journey, Shruti recognizes Prabhu's devotion and reciprocates his feelings. Realizing Malli cannot reach the site, a desperate Kakarla alerts his own security forces. Ajay's squad storms the temple, neutralizes the explosive, and extracts Shruti via helicopter.

Upon her return, Kakarla aggressively questions Shruti's virtue for spending an unchaperoned night with Prabhu. Insulted, Shruti asks Prabhu to marry her immediately, but Ajay’s commandos ambush and detain Prabhu, falsely framing him for the temple plot. Despite severe police torture, Prabhu refuses to sign a forced confession. When Shruti openly declares her love for Prabhu, Vasanth mobilizes the student body, instigating a massive statewide strike against the Governor. To quell the civil unrest, Kakarla strikes a bargain: Prabhu is unconditionally released on the condition that Shruti accepts temporary exile at her grandparents' home in Tadepalligudem.

Weeks later, Prabhu and Vasanth locate Shruti in Tadepalligudem, where her supportive grandparents bless the romance. The situation escalates when Malli spots Prabhu and alerts Kakarla. Overhearing the transmission, Prabhu uncovers documentary evidence linking Kakarla to the temple plot and exposing a new plan to bomb the Government General Hospital. Following a brief physical altercation, Prabhu and Vasanth subdue Malli and flee with the evidence.

Malli reports the breach, prompting Kakarla to order a multi-agency manhunt that ends in the students' arrest. Kakarla instructs Malli to time the hospital blast to coincide with his high-profile visit to the Vice President of India, intending to frame an unconscious Prabhu and Vasanth at the epicenter. However, the duo escapes custody, and Prabhu alerts Kathiresan.

As Malli positions the device, Kakarla betrays him with a booby-trapped radio. Surviving the attempt and seeking revenge, a wounded Malli resets the bomb's timer to detonate during Kakarla's walkthrough. While Prabhu searches for the device, Vasanth coordinates an emergency evacuation of the patients. Following his meeting, Kakarla, his wife, and Shruti become trapped in a malfunctioning hospital elevator. Security forces rescue Shruti and her mother, but Kakarla remains confined. Prabhu locates the bomb and hurls it into a nearby river, where it detonates harmlessly. As Prabhu and Shruti reunite, a dying Malli kills Kakarla with a live wire inside the elevator shaft before succumbing to his injuries.

== Cast ==
- Prabhu Deva as Prabhu (Voice dubbed by Vikram)
- Nagma as Shruthi (Voice dubbed by Saritha)
- Vadivelu as Vasanth
- S. P. Balasubrahmanyam as Kathiresan, Prabhu's father
- Raghuvaran as Mallikarjuna "Malli"
- Manorama as Shruthi's grandmother
- Girish Karnad as Kakarla Sathyanarayana
- Allu Ramalingaiah as Shruthi's grandfather
- Ajay Rathnam as Ajay
- Kavitha as Shruthi's mother
- Padmapriya as Prabhu's mother
- Kavithasri as the policewoman
- Dhamu as Prabhu's friend
- Raneesh as Prabhu's friend

== Production ==
=== Development ===
After the success of Gentleman (1993), producer K. T. Kunjumon of A. R. S. Film International decided to collaborate with director S. Shankar for the second time. Shankar narrated the plot of "a young dancer from a normal middle-class household falling in love with a girl from a very influential household". Kunjumon liked the plot and, "to turn this into as grand a film as was possible", he decided to incorporate the cold-war between the then Tamil Nadu chief minister J. Jayalalithaa and the then governor Marri Chenna Reddy into the screenplay. The dialogues were written by Balakumaran, cinematography was handled by Jeeva, and editing by B. Lenin and V. T. Vijayan.

=== Casting ===
Shankar wanted Prashanth to be the lead actor, but due to other commitments he could not act in the film. Prabhu Deva, who worked as a dancer for Kunjumon's previous ventures, was later finalised by Kunjumon. Shankar was initially reluctant to have him as the lead actor as distributors felt audience would not accept him in that role because of his "lean physique" and "bearded look". However Kunjumon was firm with his choice and wanted to prove distributors wrong. Dubbing voice for Prabhu Deva was provided by the then struggling actor Vikram. Sridevi was originally considered as the lead actress. Busy schedules meant that Nagma was instead chosen. It is her first Tamil film.

Kunjumon initially wanted to have Goundamani play Vasanth, but he did not accept, citing scheduling conflicts; Vadivelu was instead chosen. Girish Karnad was not initially interested in playing the governor, but after convincing by Kunjumon, he agreed. While S. P. Balasubrahmanyam played the role of Prabhu Deva's father, Padmapriya was reluctant to portray Prabhu Deva's mother; she relented after believing the role would give her a break, like how Keladi Kannmanii (1990) did for Radikaa who played Balasubrahmanyam's pair in that film. However, the majority of Padmapriya's scenes did not make the final cut.

=== Filming ===
Prabhu Deva's father Mugur Sundar and brother Raju Sundaram choreographed the songs. The song "Urvasi Urvasi" was shot near the SPIC building in Guindy, Anna Salai and other landmarks across Madras. Art director Thota Tharani specially created a glass framed bus for the song. Since the crew made a film with a relatively new cast it created doubts on the trade, so the crew decided to use "the newest technology at that time", hoping this move would help the film appeal to audiences. The crew decided to use visual effects extensively in the song sequences, intending to make them the attraction. S. T. Venki was chosen to supervise the visual effects, and he had done so by outsourcing the work to technicians from abroad. It became the final film to be shot inside the premises of Nataraja Temple after the film's crew was sued by court for shooting inside the temple.

The song "Mukkabla" was shot at Rajahmundry. Kasi, who designed costumes for the song had to design around 400 costumes within a short time as the dancers had only one day callsheet. The song "Ennavale" was shot at Kulu Manali. Prior to the shoot of these two songs, Prabhu Deva tore a ligament on the left leg while filming an action sequence. While he walked for a short sequence in "Ennavale", "Mukkabla" required heavy movements and he could not move his left leg due to pain. This led to him dancing the entire song with his right leg. He wore a crepe bandage in his left leg and shoes of different sizes—9 on the left and 10 on the right—and choreographed the song that way. Lalitha Mahal at Mysore was shown as Nagma's home in the film. Other filming locations included Kumbakonam, Chidambaram, Pollachi, Delhi, and it took eleven months to be completed.

== Soundtrack ==
The score and soundtrack were composed by A. R. Rahman. It was dubbed in Hindi as Humse Hai Muqabala and in Telugu as Premikudu.

== Release ==
Kaadhalan was released on 17 September 1994. The film was a major success, and by the end of January 1995 was expected to gross ₹15 crore (US$1.6 million) against a budget of ₹3 crore (US$320,000) in South India alone.

=== Reception ===
Malini Mannath of The Indian Express said, "[Kaadhalan] is better than expected, and will appeal to the college crowd." K. Vijiyan of New Straits Times said, "Sadly, the love story is not all that endearing as it is eclipsed by the dance songs." R. P. R. of Kalki praised the film for its grandeur, but criticised its story and felt Prabhu Deva's performance was overshadowed by his dancing.

=== Accolades ===
| Ceremony | Award | Awardee | Ref. |
|---|---|---|---|
| 42nd National Film Awards | Best Male Playback Singer | P. Unnikrishnan | |
| 42nd National Film Awards | Best Audiography | A. S. Laxmi Narayanan; V. S. Murthy | |
| 42nd National Film Awards | Best Editing | B. Lenin and V. T. Vijayan | |
| 42nd National Film Awards | Best Special Effects | Venky | |
| 42nd Filmfare Awards South | Best Director – Tamil | S. Shankar | |
| 42nd Filmfare Awards South | Music Director – Tamil | A. R. Rahman | |

== Controversy ==
Congress MP Era. Anbarasu submitted a petition to the Madras High Court to ban the film, citing the negative portrayal of the governor; the High Court admitted the petition. Kunjumon said he received calls from governor's office ordering him to remove certain scenes from the film. However, Jayalalithaa was impressed with the film, supported Kunjumon and no scenes were removed.

== Legacy ==
Kaadhalan attained cult status in Tamil cinema and became a breakthrough for Prabhu Deva. Lyrics from the song "Urvasi Urvasi" inspired the title of the 1996 film Take It Easy Urvashi. Furthermore, the gibberish line "Jil Jung Juk" which was spoken by Vadivelu in Kaadhalan inspired the title of a 2016 film. The line "Take It Easy Policy" from "Urvasi Urvasi" was used as the title of Prabhu Deva's 2021 autobiography.

== Bibliography ==
- Dhananjayan, G. (2014). Pride of Tamil Cinema: 1931–2013. Blue Ocean Publishers. OCLC 898765509.
