= Balakumaran =

Indian Tamil writer

- Born: 5 July 1946; Pazhamarneri, Thirukattupalli, Thanjavur, Tamil Nadu, India
- Died: 15 May 2018 (aged 71); Chennai, Tamil Nadu, India
- Occupations: Writer, novelist
- Spouses: Kamala; Shanta
- Children: Gowri, Surya

Balakumaran (5 July 1946 – 15 May 2018) was an Indian Tamil writer and author of over 200 novels, 100 short stories, and dialogue/screenplay writer for 23 films. He also contributed to Tamil periodicals such as Kalki, Ananda Vikatan and Kumudam. His notable works as a dialogue writer in Tamil Cinema include Nayakan, Guna, Baashha and Pudhupettai.

== Biography ==
Balakumaran was born in Pazhamarneri village near Thirukattupalli in Thanjavur district on 5 July 1946. He was married to Kamala and Santha. They have daughter Gowri and son Venkataraman aka Surya. He was a disciple of Yogi Ramsurat Kumar. Balakumaran died at the age of 71 due to prolonged illness in a private hospital on 15 May 2018. As a child, he was highly inspired by his mother, who was a Tamil scholar and a Siromani in Sanskrit, used verses of Sangam and other ancient literature to motivate him whenever he was emotionally down. This created a deep interest in Tamil literature which made literature his passion. Despite having a poor relationship with his father due to average academic performance especially Maths, he continued his deep interest in literature with his mother's support. After completing his studies at Wesley High School, he joined a tractor company TAFE in Chennai for a job like any middle class youth. But, with hunger for literature, he quit the job of stenographer in a tractor company and started work on poems first and gradually moved towards short stories & novels. His first stories were published in a literary magazine called 'ka-ca-da-ta-pa-Ra' and for which he was also a founding member of KaChaTaThaPaRa, a self-anointed militant literary journal that had been launched with a mission to blaze new trails in modernist literature and later in Kumudam. Balakumaran's first novel — 'Mercury Pookaal' was serialized in Saavi and his second 'Irumbu Kuthirai' (Iron horse) was serialized in Kalki.

== Literary style and themes ==
Balakumaran's works majorly revolved around woman with great empathy. In his stories, women were not merely gendered cardboard cutouts but fully sentient individuals, with bodies, dreams, desires, yearnings and frustrations. This "legitimisation" of female existence earned him succeeding generations of devoted women readers who resonated with the female characters in his fiction. In an interview, he said that during his initial days in Chennai he spent his life amidst such people. This prompted him to develop a liking for them. Balakumaran had the habit of experiencing characters by himself when writing a book. For instance, In 'Udayar' novel, he had traveled many places where Raja Raja Cholan visited in order to bring closeness towards the novel. Also, he traveled in trucks to longer distance for his 'Irumbu Kuthirai' (Iron horse) novel. In an interview given to The Times of India, he said that after reading Kalki Krishnamurthy's novel Ponniyin Selvan he wondered why it was needed to write a fictional account of the Cholas when there was enough to write about the facts there. "The Raja Raja Chola of Kalki was a different person. He hadn't become the king yet. The Thanjai temple wasn't even in the picture. I went to the Thanjavur district and visited Pallipadai, dedicated to Panchavan Madevi. She was an anukkiyar, a category that is apart from the queens and concubines. She was a friend of Raja Raja Chola I. If you look at the paintings there, each face is unique. Whoever did it, has worked on it with real faces. I did a lot of research for my novel Gangaikonda Chozhan also. But I felt I did that work, visiting those places as a tourist. Udaiyar, a six-part novel, gave me satisfaction as a writer."

== Novels written ==
- Udayar

Series about the Great Emperor Raja Raja Cholan, includes the details about how he built Thanjavur district Brihadisvara Temple, Thanjavur and many more. It is a reference to the culture gradient between different kingdoms during Udayar period.

- Mercury Pookkal
- Irumbhu Kudhiraigal
- Krishna Arjunan
- Thayumanavan
- Agalya
- Kai Veesamma Kai Veesu
- Endrendrum Anbudan
- Udayar (novel)
- Shenbagathottam
- Pani Vizhum Malar Vanam
- Kadal neelam
- Naan Enna Solli Vittaen
- Kadarpaalam
- Pey Karumbu (on Pattinathaar Swamigal)
- Simmasanam (on Kumara Guruparar Swamigal)
- Thangakkai (on Seshadiri Swamigal of Thiruvannamalai)
- Guru (on Bhagawan Sri Yogi Ram Suratkumar of Thiruvannamalai)
- Nigumbalai
- Kadalora Kuruvigal
- Karaiyora Mudhalaigal
- Payanigal Kavanikkavum
- Thunai
- Meettadha Veenai
- Vetrilai Kodi
- Manja Kaani
- Karnanin Kathai
- Shakthi
- KatruKondal Kutramillai
- En Manathu Thamaraippoo
- Kalyana Murungai
- Peria Puranak Kathaigal
- Kannaadi Koburangal
- Kadigai
- Ramayanam
- Ammavum 10 Katturaigalum
- Manam Uruguthey
- Appam Vadai Thayirsatham
- Ithuthaan Vayathu Kathalikka
- Snegamulla Singam
- Yeno Theriavillai
- kathal Aragam
- Neli Mothiram
- Ean Mathil Tamarai Poo
- Kathalperuman (On Arunagirinathar)
- Vilvamaram
- Marakal
- idharkuth Thane Aasaippattaay Balakumara
- Thalaiyanai Pookkal
- En Kanmani Thamarai (On Abirami Bhattar)
- Thozhan
- Gangai Konda Cholan
- Avani
- Idhu Pothum
- Mahabharatham
- 333 Ammaiyappan Theru
- Kanne Vanna Pasungiliye
- Brindhavanam (On Shri Ragavendra Swamigal)

== Filmography ==
Balakumaran's contribution to films was largely in the field of screenplay making and dialogue writing. His skills in crafting the dialogue for any conceivable character are noteworthy in Kollywood and his dialogues in Nayakan and Baasha are still popular and widely used. Surprisingly, he believed movies ware just a means to lift him from the lower middle-class to the upper middle-class. "For a writer of novels, cinema dialogues come easily because our mind has already been conditioned to think while writing novels."

Some of Balakumaran novel names have been used in Tamil cinema as movie titles - Idharkuthane Aasaipattai Balakumara, Irumbu Kuthirai which are samples of Balakumaran's popularity.

He directed the 1988 K. Bhagyaraj starrer film Idhu Namma Aalu.

List of the films to which Balakumaran contributed:

Writer

- Raja Paarvai (1981)
- Nayakan (1987)
- Guna (1991)
- Shenbagathottam (1991)
- Gentleman (1993)
- Kaadhalan (1994)
- Kizhakku Malai (1995)
- Ragasiya Police (1995)
- Baasha (1995)
- Sivasakthi (1996)
- Ullaasam (1997)
- Velai (1998)
- Jeans (1998)
- Mugavaree (2000)
- Uyirile Kalanthathu (2000)
- Citizen (2001)
- Majnu (2001)
- Kadhal Sadugudu (2003)
- Adhu (2004)
- Jananam (2004)
- Manmadhan (2004)
- Vallavan (2006)
- Pudhupettai (2006)

== Literary works ==
- Epic on Rajendra Cholan
- Monthly Novels on various themes..

== Awards ==
- Literary Awards won:
  - Irumbu Kudhiraigal – Raja Sir Annamalai Chettiyar Trust Awards
  - Mercury Pookal – Illakkiya Sindhanai Awards
  - Kadarpalam – State Award (II Prize) (Short Story Collection)
  - Sugajeevanam – State Award (I Prize) (short story collection)
- Cinema Awards Won:
  - Guna – Cinema Express Award
  - Kaadalan – Tamil Nadu State Film Award for Best Dialogue Writer
- Other Awards:
  - Honoured with "Sindhanai Chemmal" title (From Lions Club Madras)
  - Kalaimaamani Award from Government of Tamil Nadu

== See also ==
- List of Indian writers
