= Mudhalvan =

1999 Indian film by Shankar

- Poster
- Directed by: Shankar
- Screenplay by: Shankar
- Story by: Shankar
- Dialogues by: Sujatha
- Produced by: S. Shankar; R. Madhesh
- Starring: Arjun; Manisha Koirala; Raghuvaran; Manivannan; Vadivelu
- Cinematography: K. V. Anand
- Edited by: B. Lenin; V. T. Vijayan
- Music by: A. R. Rahman
- Production company: S Films
- Distributed by: S Films
- Release date: 7 November 1999
- Running time: 178 minutes
- Country: India
- Language: Tamil

Mudhalvan (transl. 'Chief Minister') is a 1999 Indian Tamil-language political action thriller film co-produced, co-written and directed by Shankar. The film stars Arjun, Manisha Koirala, and Raghuvaran in lead roles, while Vadivelu and Manivannan appear in supporting roles. The film featured an award-winning soundtrack composed by A. R. Rahman, cinematography by K. V. Anand, and dialogue by Sujatha. Many members of the DMK government of Tamil Nadu (which was the ruling party at that time) believed that the antagonist was modelled on M. Karunanidhi, the CM & Supreme Leader of the DMK. Subsequently, the film received release issues and oppressive pressure from the DMK.

The film revolves around an ambitious TV journalist, Pugazhendi, who gets his first interview with the Chief Minister of Tamil Nadu. Pugazh asks controversial questions regarding the Chief Minister's inactions, to which the CM challenges him to face his unresolved issues by becoming his replacement CM for a day. After initially rejecting the offer, Pugazh agrees and manages to implement immense and effective changes to the government, to the point where state voters eventually elect him as their new Chief Minister. The subsequent unpopularity and jealousy that the old Chief Minister goes through results in him taking revenge on Pugazh, and how he is stopped forms the crux of the story.

The film was released on 7 November 1999, as a Diwali release. Within days of the release of the film, Madurai had a high number of pirated videos and cable operators requested with airing the film multiple times on their channels. Despite opposition from the DMK government & its associated party, the film received critical acclaim and was a major commercial success, becoming the second highest-grossing Tamil film of 1999. The film ran for over 100 days in theatres and won awards on a regional scale. The film was later remade in Hindi as Nayak: The Real Hero (2001) by the same director.

== Plot ==
N. Pugazhendi ("Pugazh") is an idealistic television journalist working in Chennai. While covering a violent street clash between college students and public transit drivers, he surreptitiously records a video of the state's corrupt Chief Minister, Aranganathar, ordering the police department to refrain from arresting the rioters, as they comprise his core political constituency. Around the same time, Pugazh meets Thenmozhi, a fiercely independent woman, and falls in love with her. However, her traditional father flatly rejects Pugazh’s marriage proposal, maintaining a strict stance that his daughter must only marry a secured government employee.

The narrative shifts dramatically when Pugazh conducts a live, hard-hitting television interview with Aranganathar. He confronts the politician with evidence of his administration's systemic corruption and deliberate inaction during the riots. Defensive and cornered, Aranganathar argues that an outsider cannot comprehend the immense pressures of governing and challenges Pugazh to assume the role of Chief Minister for a single day. Driven by public interest, Pugazh accepts the wager.

During his 24-hour tenure as the temporary Chief Minister, Pugazh works tirelessly alongside an upright government secretary, Mayakrishnan. He launches aggressive state reforms, arresting corrupt officials, streamlining welfare distribution, and suspending negligent bureaucrats. His final executive action involves filing sweeping corruption charges against the ruling party, resulting in Aranganathar’s arrest. Though quickly released on bail, an enraged Aranganathar dispatches a squad of assassins to eliminate Pugazh, who narrowly escapes with minor injuries.

Following his brief stint, Pugazh retreats to the village of Pooncholai, where he is celebrated by the local citizenry. Meanwhile, Aranganathar’s public approval plummets, causing his coalition allies to withdraw their support. This triggers a constitutional crisis, the dissolution of the state legislature, and the announcement of a snap general election. The public overwhelmingly clamors for Pugazh to enter the political arena, but he initially declines to preserve his privacy. Mayakrishnan eventually convinces him to sacrifice personal comfort for the greater good. Running on an anti-graft platform, Pugazh secures a historic landslide victory, sweeping every legislative seat.

As the newly elected Chief Minister, Pugazh accelerates his welfare and development programs, further alienating the political establishment. Desperate, Aranganathar and his associates contract a professional hitman to assassinate him. While secretly visiting Thenmozhi, Pugazh evades an ambush, but the close call prompts Thenmozhi's father to deliver an ultimatum: Pugazh must choose between his governance or his relationship with his daughter. Seeking a resolution, Pugazh’s parents arrange to meet Thenmozhi's father. However, Aranganathar orchestrates a retaliatory strike, detonating a bomb at Pugazh's family residence that tragically kills his parents.

Grief-stricken, Pugazh confronts Aranganathar and uncovers a wider conspiracy to detonate multiple explosives across Chennai. Coordinating rapidly with Mayakrishnan and a specialized bomb disposal squad, Pugazh manages to locate and neutralize nearly all the hidden hazards. Publicly, Aranganathar shifts the blame, accusing Pugazh of staging the bombings to manipulate public sympathy.

Seeking a definitive resolution, Pugazh invites Aranganathar to his private office. During their tense conversation, Pugazh pulls out a firearm, intentionally inflicts a non-fatal flesh wound on his own shoulder, and hurls the weapon to Aranganathar. Alerted by the gunfire, armed security personnel burst into the room to find Aranganathar holding the weapon. Believing the Chief Minister is under active assassination threat, the guards shoot Aranganathar dead. In his final moments, the dying politician remembers his fateful television challenge.

In the aftermath, Pugazh experiences a deep moral conflict, feeling guilty for orchestrating Aranganathar's death and being forced to adopt manipulative political tactics. Mayakrishnan comforts him, asserting that the extreme measure was justified to protect the state from total ruin. Recognizing Pugazh's ultimate sacrifice and integrity, Thenmozhi's father relents and consents to the marriage. With the political opposition neutralized, Pugazh successfully steers the state into an era of unprecedented socioeconomic development and systemic transparency.

== Cast ==
- Arjun as N. Pugazhenthi "Pugazh"
- Raghuvaran as Aranganathar
- Manisha Koirala as Thenmozhi
- Laila as Kalakkal Shuba
- Manivannan as Chief Secretary Maya Krishnan
- Vadivelu as Palavesham
- Vijayakumar as Thenmozhi's father
- V. M. C. Haneefa as Chinnasamy, Aranganathar's right-hand henchman
- Sushmita Sen in item number "Shakalaka Baby" (special appearance)
- S. V. Ramadoss as Minister Thirupathisamy, coalition party leader
- Artist Natanam as R. Narayanan, Pugazhenthi's father
- Kalairani as Pugazhenthi's mother
- Fathima Babu as Maragadham, Aranganathar's wife
- Surya as Manohar, Chief of Security for Pugazhenthi
- Omakuchi Narasimhan as Palavesham's uncle
- Scissor Manohar as a bus driver in the student riot
- Ravi as slum rogue
- Sampath Ram as sub-inspector (uncredited)

== Production ==
Following the success of Jeans (1998), S. Shankar chose to make a political action film, which would later become Mudhalvan.

The lead role was initially written with Rajinikanth in mind, but he was unwilling to star in the film. Vijay was also considered by Shankar for the role, though the actor turned the offer down. Shankar revealed that he even approached Kamal Haasan for the film, but he was doing Hey Ram at that time. Arjun, who had previously collaborated with Shankar in Gentleman (1993), was willing to offer bulk schedule dates for the film and was subsequently signed on.

Shankar noted that he was interested in casting Meena as the lead actress, but opted against doing so as the actress was working with Arjun in another film in the same period, Rhythm (2000). Subsequently, Manisha Koirala, who worked with Shankar in Indian, was selected to play that role. Raghuvaran was signed to play the chief antagonist in the film, while Vadivelu and Manivannan were also chosen to play other characters. Despite reports that Shilpa Shetty was added to the cast in February 1999, it was later clarified to be untrue. Laila, who had made her acting debut earlier in the year with Kallazhagar, was signed on to appear in the film. Originally, her role was supposed to feature throughout the film, but Shankar shortened her character, owing to her call sheet problems. Renowned muralist Natanam and Kalairani were cast as Arjun's parents. S. Sashikanth, who went on to produce films like Tamizh Padam (2010) and Kaaviya Thalaivan (2014), and K. R. Mathivaanan, who directed Aridhu Aridhu (2010), worked as assistant directors. Reportedly, Solomon Pappaiah played a role in this film, which was cut due to length issues.

The film was jointly launched by S. Shankar and his co-director R. Madhesh in October 1998 at an event attended by actors and technicians from the Tamil film industry, with actors Rajinikanth and Kamal Haasan being the special invitees. Production continued for several months, with reports suggesting that the film was delayed due to Manisha Koirala's unavailability though Shankar later stressed the production work demanded such delay. Parts of the film were also shot in Bikaner, Rajasthan while the team also shot extensively in rural Tamil Nadu. The film's cinematographer Anand later noted that the scenes involving crowds shot on Anna Salai, Chennai were among the hardest and most satisfying scenes he had worked on. The song "Shakalaka Baby" was the last song to be shot, with Sushmita Sen selected to feature in a special appearance for the song. Stunt master Peter Hein revealed that he worked as a body double for Arjun in the scene where he had to run nude on the streets.

== Themes and influences ==
The film dealt with the theme of a television cameraman who is forced to take over the duty of Chief Minister for one day. It also dealt with the concept of opportunities for educated people in politics and demonstrated it is possible to bring change in the country. The film's basic idea was inspired from Nixon-Frost interviews which were broadcast in 1977 and also inspired by Indian actor Sivaji Ganesan being named the honorary mayor of Niagara Falls, New York for one day during his visit to the United States.

== Soundtrack ==
Mudhalvan

Soundtrack album by A. R. Rahman
- Released: 31 October 1999
- Recorded: Panchathan Record Inn, Chennai
- Studios: Panchathan Studios, A.M Studios
- Genre: feature film soundtrack
- Length: 36:19
- Language: Tamil
- Label: Five Star audio
- Producer: A. R. Rahman

A. R. Rahman chronology
Taj Mahal (1999)	Mudhalvan (1999)	Thakshak (1999)

The soundtrack features six songs composed by A. R. Rahman and lyrics penned by Vairamuthu, except Shakalaka Baby which Shankar wrote. The song "Shakalaka Baby" was re-edited by Rahman and featured on the international musical production Bombay Dreams, which ran in Europe and North America from 2002 to 2005. This version was also released as a single. A Mandarin Chinese remix of the track sung by Singaporean singer Kelly Poon was featured in her album In the Heart Of The World (2007). Rahman also reused the track in the soundtrack to Mudhalvan's Hindi remake, Nayak: The Real Hero.

The release of the soundtrack was held at Sathyam Cinemas, Chennai, on 31 October 1999 with two songs from the film being performed on stage. The special guests for the event were actor Kamal Haasan and actress Sushmita Sen, who performed "Shakalaka Baby" in the film. The event was well attended by the cast and the crew of the film, with other guests including cinematographer P. C. Sriram, actress Sarika, and actor Suriya.

The soundtrack was a critical and commercial success; the initial day audio sale alone exceeded three lakh units. The song "Azhagana Rakshasiye" is based on Reetigowla raga.

All lyrics are written by Vairamuthu.

Tamil
No.	Title	Singer(s)	Length
1.	"Kurukku Chiruththavale"	Hariharan, Mahalakshmi Iyer	6:42
2.	"Mudhalvanae"	Shankar Mahadevan, S. Janaki	5:29
3.	"Uppu Karuvadu"	Shankar Mahadevan, Kavita Krishnamurthy	5:38
4.	"Azhagana Ratchashiyae"	S. P. Balasubrahmanyam, Harini, G. V. Prakash Kumar	6:11
5.	"Ulundhu Vithakkaiyilae"	Srinivas, Swarnalatha, Hariharan, Mahalakshmi Iyer	6:05
6.	"Shakalaka Baby"	Vasundhara Das, Pravin Mani	5:23
Total length:			35:28

All lyrics are written by A. M. Ratnam.

Telugu
No.	Title	Singer(s)	Length
1.	"Nelluri Nerajana"	Hariharan, Mahalakshmi Iyer	6:44
2.	"Magadheera"	S. Janaki, Shankar Mahadevan	6:41
3.	"Utti Meeda Koodu"	Shankar Mahadevan, Kavita Krishnamurthy	5:41
4.	"Andala Rakshasive"	S. P. Balasubrahmanyam, Harini	6:13
5.	"Eruvaka"	Swarnalatha, Srinivas	6:05
6.	"Shakalaka Baby"	Vasundhara Das, Pravin Mani, Devan Ekambaram	5:38

== Release ==
The film's release prints were 4,876 m (15,997 ft) long. The film was released on 7 November 1999 while the Telugu dubbed version, Oke Okkadu (transl.: Only One) released on 9 November 1999 which was also a blockbuster. Upon release, the film won positive reviews and was successful at the box office, becoming the Second highest-grossing Tamil film of 1999. It was later remade in Hindi as Nayak. The film went on to run for over one hundred days in cinemas with an event being held at Kamaraj Hall on 25 February 2000 to mark one hundred days since release. The event, similar to the launch, attracted several people from the film industry with Kamal Haasan, once again, being the chief guest of the event.

== Reception ==
On 21 November 1999, Ananda Vikatan in its review gave 43 marks and appreciated the film stating that: "One can see Shankar's grandeur in the way he presented a social problem magnificently. Shankar has approached a serious social issue with usual entertainment elements". The Hindu said "Shankar scores again". In regard to the lead performances, Arjun is described as having "acquitted himself with aplomb", while Manisha's performance was criticised with claims that she "lacks the freshness that one always associates her with". The critic also referred to Shankar's direction and Sujatha's dialogues as a "positive", while drawing praise to the videos of the songs describing that "every song and dance sequence seems a magnum opus by itself". The New Indian Express described the film as "absorbing" and praised certain scenes, although it criticised the videos of the songs as a "fiasco". Aurangazeb of Kalki praised the screenplay and certain scenes which make impact but panned the visual effects and felt the film has a documentary feel which is both positive and negative.

== Accolades ==
Award	Category	Recipient	Ref.
47th Filmfare Awards South	Filmfare Best Music Director Award	A. R. Rahman	
47th Filmfare Awards South	Filmfare Award for Best Female Playback Singer – Tamil	Vasundhara Das for "Shakalaka Baby"	
47th Filmfare Awards South	Filmfare Award for Best Choreography – South	Chinni Prakash	
Cinema Express Awards	Best Villain	Raghuvaran	
Dinakaran Film Awards	Best Director	S. Shankar	
Dinakaran Film Awards	Best Music Director	A. R. Rahman	
Dinakaran Film Awards	Best Female Playback Singer	S. Janaki	
Dinakaran Film Awards	Best Villain Actor	Raghuvaran	
Dinakaran Film Awards	Best Dialogue Writer	Sujatha	
Dinakaran Film Awards	Best Stunt Director	Kanal Kannan	
Tamil Nadu State Film Awards	Best Villain	Raghuvaran	

== In popular culture ==
Songs from the film's soundtrack inspired a number of Tamil film titles. Rama Narayanan directed a film titled Shakalaka Baby in 2002. A film titled Lukku Vida Thonalaiyaa, a line from the song "Shakalaka Baby", also began production in 2002 but was not released. A dialogue from Mudhalvan, "Sushma, saamaan nikalo" inspired the title of the song "Saroja Saman Nikalo" from Chennai 600028 (2007).

The scenes, songs and dialogues from the film have been parodied in Budget Padmanabhan (2000), Kandha Kadamba Kathir Vela (2000), Kanna Unnai Thedukiren (2001), Run (2002), Dubai Seenu (2007), Sivaji: The Boss (2007), Singakutty (2008), and Kaalaippani (2008). The film has also been spoofed in Star Vijay's Lollu Sabha with the same title with Santhanam as the main character. In 2017 film Kavan, the interview scene was inspired from this film. Kavan was directed by K. V. Anand, who was the cinematographer of Mudhalvan.

== See also ==
- Servant of the People (2015 TV series) (2015–2019), Ukrainian comedy television series with similar concept

== Bibliography ==
- Dhananjayan, G. (2011). The Best of Tamil Cinema, 1931 to 2010: 1931–1976. Galatta Media. ISBN 978-81-921043-0-0.
