= John Kolvenbach =

American playwright

- Occupation(s): Playwright; Actor; Screenwriter
- Years active: 1992–present

John Kolvenbach is an American playwright. His plays have been performed on the West End (Love Song, on an average day) and all over the world, including productions in Rome, Sydney, Wellington, Seoul, Melbourne, Tel Aviv, Zurich, San Juan, Berlin and in many theatres in the US. The plays are published by Methuen and the Dramatists Play Service. His most notable works include Stand Up If You're Here Tonight, Reel to Reel, Sister Play, Gizmo Love, Love Song, On An Average Day, Goldfish, Marriage Play, Bank Job, Fabuloso.

== Career ==
After graduating from Middlebury College in 1988 he attended Rutgers University, graduating with a Masters in Fine Arts degree in 1992. Both Love Song and On an average day were performed in the West End in London. Love Song was directed by John Crowley and featured Kristen Johnston, Cillian Murphy, Neve Campbell and Michael McKean. Love Song was nominated for an Olivier Award as best new comedy.

On an average day was also directed by Crowley and featured Woody Harrelson and Kyle MacLachlan. Love Song premiered at the Steppenwolf company in Chicago, directed by Austin Pendleton. Goldfish was presented by South Coast Repertory in their 2009 season, directed by Loretta Greco. Kolvenbach's companion piece to Goldfish, entitled Mrs. Whitney, was presented in repertory with Goldfish at the Magic Theatre in San Francisco in the Fall of 2009. 'Sister Play' premiered at The Harbor Stage Company and at the Magic, directed by the author. Reel to Reel premiered at the Magic, also directed by the author. Stand Up If You're Here Tonight premiered at Harbor Stage and in Los Angeles at Circle X and with Vs. Theatre Company. The show moved to Chicago, with American Blues and then to Paris. Stand Up If You're Here Tonight will be at The Huntington Theatre in 2023.

Fabuloso premiered on Cape Cod at the Wellfleet Harbor Actors Theater (WHAT) in the summer of 2008, directed by the author. Also at WHAT; the premiere of Gizmo Love (2004), directed by Sam Weisman and productions of On an average day (2006) and Love Song (2007) both directed by Jeff Zinn.

He also acted in the 1996 Indian period epic film Kaalapani directed by Priyadarshan where he was cast alongside Mohanlal.

== Filmography ==
As playwright

- Reel to Reel
- Sister Play
- Marriage Play
- Bank Job
- Love Song
- On an average day
- Goldfish
- Mrs. Whitney
- Gizmo Love
- Fabuloso

As screenwriter

- 2008 Clear Winter Noon (Blacklist)
- 2014 Fool's Game
- 2013 Gray Dog (Short) (writer)
- 2004 Coney Island (Video short)

As actor

- 1996 Kaalapani
- 2021 Pathonpatham Noottandu as William Cullen

== Awards and nominations ==
- Nominated for Olivier Award as best new comedy - Love Song
