= Naveen Paul =

Indian visual effects designer

- Born: 27 October 1980 (age 45); Mumbai, Maharashtra, India
- Occupation: Visual Effects Designer

Naveen Paul is an Indian visual effects designer known for his works exclusively in Hindi cinema. He is a VFX supervisor and creative head of NY VFXwala. He is known for his works in the films like Shivaay (2016) and Bhuj: The Pride of India (2021). Known for aesthetically correct and technically strong shots, Paul has received the National Film Award for Best Special Effects for his works in Shivaay (2016). He was also a part of the core team in the films The Chronicles of Narnia and Superman Returns

== Filmography ==
Year	Film	Language	Visual Effects Supervisor	Digital compositing	Notes
2002	Devdas	Hindi		Yes	
2006	The Fast and the Furious: Tokyo Drift	English		Yes	
2006	Superman Returns	English		Yes	
2008	Golmaal Returns	Hindi	Yes		
2011	Singham	Hindi	Yes		
2013	Chennai Express	Hindi			Creative director for visual effects
2014	Singham Returns	Hindi			Creative director for visual effects
2015	Drishyam	Hindi			VFX creative head
2015	Dilwale	Hindi			VFX creative head
2015	Bajirao Mastani	Hindi			VFX creative head
2016	Shivaay	Hindi			National Film Award for Best Special Effects
2016	Dangal	Hindi			VFX creative head
2017	Jagga Jasoos	Hindi			VFX creative head
2018	Padmaavat	Hindi			VFX creative head
2018	Simmba	Hindi			VFX creative head
2019	Bigil	Tamil			Visual Effects
2020	Tanhaji	Hindi			VFX creative head
2020	Malang	Hindi			VFX creative head
2020	Ludo	Hindi			VFX creative head
2021	Bhuj: The Pride of India	Hindi			VFX creative head
2021	Sardar Udham	Hindi			VFX creative head
2021	Sooryavanshi	Hindi			VFX creative head
2022	Runway 34	Hindi			VFX creative head
2022	Ponniyin Selvan: I	Tamil			VFX creative head
2022	Ram Setu	Hindi			VFX creative head
2022	Thank God	Hindi			VFX creative head
2023	Bholaa	Hindi			VFX creative head

== Awards ==
- National Film Award for Best Special Effects for Shivaay (2016)
