= 42nd Filmfare Awards South =

Award ceremony for South Indian films

- Date: 23 September 1995
- Site: Madras, Tamil Nadu, India
- Hosted by: Priya Raman
- Produced by: Manikchand

The 42nd Filmfare Awards South ceremony, honouring the winners of the best of South Indian cinema in 1994, was held on 23 September 1995 was an event held at the Kamaraj Hall, Madras.

== Jury ==
Kannada	Malayalam
Dr. Shankara Linge Gowda; M S Sathyu; Dr. Renuka Viswanathan	Justice T L Vishwanatha Iyer; Babu Rajeev; K L Kumar
Telugu	Tamil
G Kishen Rao; Shoba Raju; S M Haq; Appa Rao	T K Balakrishnan; Dr. Nalli Kuppuswami Chetti; A Natarajan; R vijayaraghavan

== Awards ==
=== Main awards ===
==== Kannada cinema ====
Best Film	Best Director
Karulina Koogu	Rajendra Singh Babu - Mahakshathriya
Best Actor	Best Actress
Vishnuvardhan- Haalunda Thavaru	Shruthi - Hettha Karulu
Best Music Director
Hamsalekha - Haalunda Thavaru

==== Malayalam cinema ====
Best Film	Best Director
Sukrutham	Hariharan - Parinayam
Best Actor	Best Actress
Mohanlal - Pavithram	Shobhana - Thenmavin Kombath
Best Music Director
Bombay Ravi - Parinayam

==== Tamil cinema ====
Best Film	Best Director
Karuththamma	Shankar -Kaadhalan
Best Actor	Best Actress
R. Sarathkumar - Nattamai	Revathy -Priyanka
Best Music Director
A. R. Rahman - Kaadhalan

==== Telugu cinema ====
Best Film	Best Director
Aame	S.V. Krishna Reddy - Shubha Lagnam
Best Actor	Best Actress
Rajasekhar- Anna	Aamani- Shubha Lagnam
Best Music Director
M M Keeravani- Criminal

=== Lifetime Achievement Awards ===
Lifetime Achievement
- K. Balachander (Director)
- B. Saroja Devi (Actress)
- K. Viswanath (Director)
- Hrishikesh Mukherjee (Director)
- Soumitra Chatterjee (Actor)
- Madhu (Actor)

== Awards Presentation ==
- M M Ramachandran (Best Film Malayalam) Received Award from Kasturi
- Mullapalli Brahmanandan (Best Film Telugu) Received Award from Edida Nageswara Rao
- Khushbu Receives Bharathi Raja Award (Best Film Tamil) from Sonali Bendre
- Rajendra Singh Babu (Best Director Kannada) Received Award from P V Sarvanan
- Hariharan (Best Director Malayalam) Received Award from Parthiban
- S.V. Krishna Reddy (Best Director Telugu) Received Award from R. B. Choudary
- Shankar (Best Director Tamil) Received Award from Nagma
- Hamsalekha (Best Music Director Kannada) Received Award from Vineeth
- Bombay Ravi (Best Music Director Malayalam) Received Award from Neelam
- A. R. Rahman (Best Music Director Tamil) Received Award from Urmila Matondkar
- Shruthi (Best Actress Kannada) Received Award from Priya Raman
- Shobhana (Best Actress Malayalam) Received Award from Prabhu Deva
- Aamani (Best Actress Telugu) Received Award from Sivakumar and Tisca Chopra
- Revathy (Best Actress Tamil) Received Award from Shilpa Shetty
- Vishnuvardhan (Best Actor Kannada) Received Award from Urvashi
- Mohanlal (Best Actor Malayalam) Received Award from Mammootty
- Rajshekar (Best Actor Telugu) Received Award from Khushbu
- R. Sarathkumar (Best Actor Tamil) Received Award from Manisha Koirala
- K. Balachander (Lifetime Achievement Award) Received Award from Kamal Haasan
- B. Saroja Devi (Lifetime Achievement Award) Received Award from Gemini Ganesan
- K. Viswanath (Lifetime Achievement Award) Received Award from Mani Ratnam
- Hrishikesh Mukherjee (Lifetime Achievement Award) Received Award from Shekhar Kapoor
- Soumitra Chatterjee (Lifetime Achievement Award) Received Award from Nana Patekar
- Madhu (Lifetime Achievement Award) Received Award from Suhasini
