= Indian (1996 film) =

1996 Indian film by Shankar

- Theatrical release poster
- Directed by: Shankar
- Screenplay by: Shankar
- Story by: S. Shankar
- Dialogues by: Sujatha
- Produced by: A. M. Rathnam
- Starring: Kamal Haasan; Manisha Koirala; Urmila Matondkar; Sukanya; Nedumudi Venu
- Cinematography: Jeeva
- Edited by: B. Lenin; V. T. Vijayan
- Music by: A. R. Rahman
- Production company: Sri Surya Movies
- Release date: 9 May 1996
- Running time: 185 minutes
- Country: India
- Language: Tamil
- Budget: ₹15 crore

Indian is a 1996 Indian Tamil-language vigilante action film directed by Shankar and produced by Sri Surya Movies. The film stars Kamal Haasan in dual roles as a retired vigilante who seeks to eradicate corruption in India, and his son who lives by corruption. Manisha Koirala, Urmila Matondkar, Sukanya, Manorama, Goundamani, Senthil, Nedumudi Venu, Kasthuri, Nizhalgal Ravi and Ajay Rathnam appear in pivotal roles. The music was composed by A. R. Rahman, while cinematography and editing were handled by Jeeva and B. Lenin-V. T. Vijayan.

Indian was released on 9 May 1996 and became the highest-grossing Tamil film upon release. It also helped popularise varma kalai, the martial art practised by the title character. The film was selected by India as its entry for the Best Foreign Language Film for the Academy Awards in 1996, but was not nominated. It won three National Film Awards, including Best Actor (Haasan), two South Filmfare Awards and two Tamil Nadu State Film Awards. It was partially reshot in Hindi as Hindustani with Manorama being replaced by Aruna Irani and released on 23 August 1996. A sequel titled Indian 2 was released in 2024.

== Plot ==
A series of identical, high-profile homicides occurs in Avadi over the span of a few months. Each victim is stabbed with precision, paralyzed instantly via their pressure points, and left to die by an old man. To capture the old elusive serial killer, the Chennai Police Department establish a joint task force led by Krishnaswamy. Analyzing the evidence, specifically the distinct, archaic handwriting style of a taunting letter left at the murder scene of a government treasury officer, the investigators deduce that the perpetrator must be over seventy year old. The killer is revealed to be Senapathy, a terrorist-turned-freedom fighter and disciplined veteran of the Indian National Army (INA) led by Subhas Chandra Bose. Driven by a fierce anti-corruption ideology, Senapathy began his vigilante spree by executing corrupt officials who extorted bribes.

Concurrently, Chandrabose alias Chandru works as a small-time broker outside the Chennai Regional Transport Office (RTO), alongside his assistant Subbaiah, facilitating bribes for citizens seeking licenses and permits. Chandru is in a relationship with Aishwarya, an animal rights activist. Aishwarya frequently clashes with Swapna, the daughter of the Secretary of Transportation. Hoping to secure a lucrative, permanent position as a brake inspector at the RTO, Chandru systematically caters to Swapna's affluent family, performing domestic chores to win their favor. While Swapna develops unrequited feelings for Chandru, she steps back upon recognizing his genuine devotion to Aishwarya.

Krishnaswamy eventually tracks Senapathy to his residence by masquerading as a freedom fighter eligible for Swathantra Sainik Samman Pension Scheme. When he attempts an arrest, Senapathy uses his mastery of Varma kalai, an ancient martial art centered on vital pressure points, to non-fatally paralyze Krishnaswamy, and Senapathy's wife Amirthavalli explains his cause to Krishnaswamy. They seek refuge at a local hospital, where Amirthavalli encounters Chandru in an elevator, revealing that Chandru is Senapathy’s and Amirthavalli's estranged son. The two had previously experienced a bitter falling out over Senapathy’s uncompromising righteousness, which Chandru dismissed as impractical in modern society.

Senapathy broadcasts the live kidnapping and execution of a corrupt senior doctor. He reveals to the public that years earlier, the doctor had willfully allowed Senapathy’s daughter, Kasturi, to succumb to third-degree burns because Senapathy refused to pay a bribe. This dramatic exposure triggers massive public sympathy and national support for Senapathy's vigilante crusade. However, having successfully secured his position as a brake inspector, Chandru succumbs to the very systemic corruption his father fights; he accepts a bribe to issue a safety certificate to a school bus with faulty brakes. The bus crashes and kills forty children.

After bribing a doctor and a police officer, Chandru tries to inject alcohol into the bus driver's corpse to frame him for drunk driving. Senapathy intercepts Chandru but before he can kill him, Krishnaswamy intervenes and arrests the vigilante. Utilizing his martial arts expertise, Senapathy swiftly escapes. Ignoring his wife and Aishwarya's desperate pleas for mercy, Senapathy tracks Chandru to the Chennai airport as his son attempts to flee to Mumbai. Following a high-speed chase on the tarmac, Senapathy mournfully kills Chandru. Moments later, the jeep Chandru is driving collides with a taxiing airplane, causing a massive explosion that seemingly kills Senapathy.

While analysing the airport's security footage, Krishnaswamy discovers that Senapathy escaped from the jeep seconds before the explosion. Senapathy calls Krishnaswamy from Hong Kong to confirm his survival and asks him to announce it to the public. He promises to return should the need for his presence arise.

== Cast ==
- Kamal Haasan in a dual role as:
  - Senapathy (Indian)
  - Chandrabose (Chandru)
- Manisha Koirala as Aishwarya (voice dubbed by Rohini)
- Urmila Matondkar as Swapna (voice dubbed by Bhanupriya)
- Sukanya as Amrithavalli
- Manorama as Kuppamma
  - Aruna Irani as Gulabo (Hindi version only)
- Goundamani as Subbaiah
- Senthil as Panneerselvam
- Nedumudi Venu as Krishnaswamy IPS (voice dubbed by Nassar)
- Kasthuri as Kasthuri
- Nizhalgal Ravi as a corrupt doctor
- Ajay Rathnam as Gowda
- Ponnambalam as Kondithoppu "Kada" Kumar
- Mahanadi Shankar as a freedom fighter
- Bala Singh as Treasury department officer
- Chokkalinga Bhagavathar
- Omakuchi Narasimhan as a lorry driver
- Crazy Mohan as Parthasarathy
- Vikram Dharma
- Kovai Senthil as a customer
- S. V. Venkatraman in a special appearance

== Production ==
=== Development ===
Soon after the release of Gentleman (1993), Shankar narrated a script titled Periya Manushan to actor Rajinikanth, but the pair did not end up collaborating. Since the subject revolved around a father and son, he considered Rajasekhar for the father role, with either Nagarjuna or Venkatesh as the son, but the plans did not materialise. The film eventually materialised under the title Indian, produced by A. M. Rathnam, with Kamal Haasan playing both roles. Haasan was initially reluctant to do the film because of its similarities to his 1977 film Naam Pirandha Mann, but relented after Rathnam paid him the entire salary before he began acting. On 17 February 1995, the official muhurat pooja for this film took place, with Rajinikanth attending the event as its chief guest.

=== Casting and filming ===
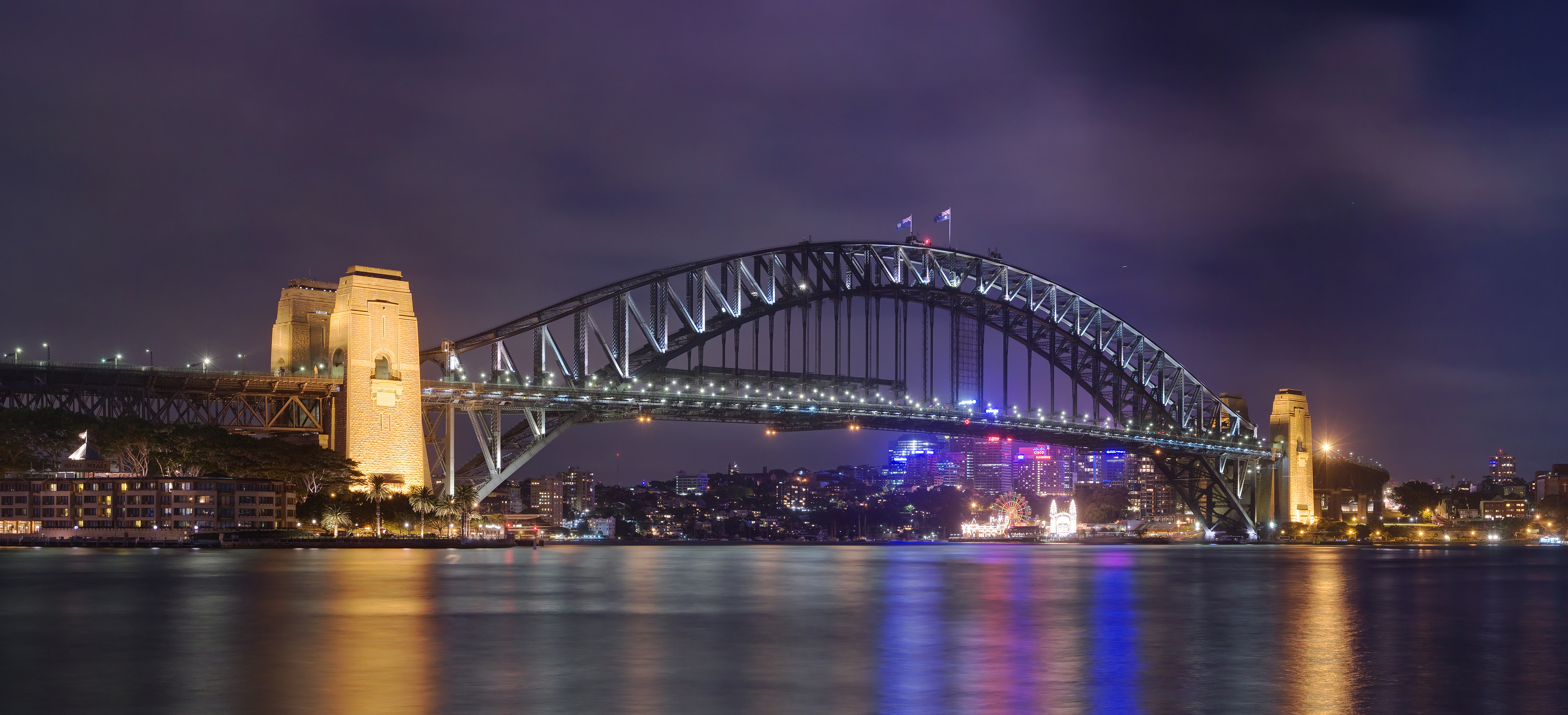
Sydney Harbour Bridge, which appears in the song "Telephone Manipol".

Shankar tried to cast Aishwarya Rai to make her debut and portray the leading female role. Her commitment to her advertisement agency until October 1995 meant that she was unavailable to sign the film. Subsequently, Manisha Koirala was selected after Shankar was impressed with her performance in Bombay (1995). The producers wanted Radhika to play the pair of the older Kamal Haasan in the film, but her television commitments meant that she was unable to sign a contract. Urvashi subsequently replaced her, only for Shankar to throw her out for missing a day's schedule to attend her sister's wedding. The role was finally handed to Sukanya, who had previously appeared alongside Kamal Haasan in Mahanadhi (1994). Bollywood actress Urmila Matondkar was signed to play another leading role after the producers were impressed with her performance and the success of her 1995 Hindi film, Rangeela. Malayalam character actor Nedumudi Venu signed on to play the role of CBI officer Krishnaswamy at Haasan's recommendation, while Nassar dubbed his voice. The producers engaged Hollywood make-up artists Michael Westmore and Michael Jones to work on the designs for the senior Kamal Haasan's and Sukanya's look in the film. The senior Kamal Haasan's look for the character Senapathy was based on Haasan's father. Shankar initially wanted P. C. Sreeram to handle cinematography; however due to his other commitments, Jeeva was chosen as cinematographer. One of the assistant directors chanced upon a book by varma kalai practitioner R. Rajendran about the martial art, and Rajendran was hired to teach Haasan the same.

For production work, Shankar visited Las Vegas to learn about new technology and purchased cameras for production. Furthermore, the director visited Australia alongside cinematographer Jeeva and music director A. R. Rahman to location hunt and to compose tunes. The film's unit was given strict orders to maintain privacy, with Hindi actor Jackie Shroff being notably turned away from visiting the shooting spot. A song for the film was shot at Prasad Studios featuring Haasan and Matondkar alongside 70 Bombay models. This led to a protest from the Cine Dancers Union who argued that Tamil dancers should have been utilised instead, with Shankar opting to pay them off to avoid further hassle. Another duet between Haasan and Koirala was shot near the Sydney Opera House in Sydney and Canberra for fifteen days. A flashback song was canned with four hundred dancers and a thousand extras at Gingee with Kamal Haasan and Sukanya, while another song featured shooting in Jodhpur, Rajasthan. A fight scene was shot at Irungkaattukottai Motor Racing Track. The flashback sequences, set during pre-Independent India, were in black-and-white. Graphic designer Venky noted that Indian was his most difficult project to date (in 1997) with a scene constructed to feature Kamal Haasan's character alongside Subhas Chandra Bose. Venky had to remove blemishes on the film reel of Bose provided by the Film Division's archive before merging Haasan on to the shot to make it appear that the pair were marching in tandem.

Indian was the most expensive Indian film at the time. According to an estimate by critic G. Dhananjayan, the production budget was ₹8 crores (worth ₹96 crores in 2021 prices). Rediff.com however estimated budget to be ₹15 crore. The music video for "Akadanu Naanga" directed by Padam Kumar and choreographed by Vaibhavi Merchant, cost ₹1.5 crore.

== Soundtrack ==
Indian

Soundtrack album by A. R. Rahman
- Released: 1996
- Recorded: Panchathan Record Inn
- Genre: Feature film soundtrack
- Length: 30:05
- Labels: Pyramid (Tamil); Sony Music India (Tamil); T-Series (Telugu); Tips Industries (Hindi)
- Producer: A. R. Rahman

A. R. Rahman chronology
| Love Birds (1996) | Indian (1996) | Kadhal Desam (1996) |
External audio
- Audio Jukebox (Tamil) on YouTube
- Audio Jukebox (Telugu) on YouTube
- Audio Jukebox (Hindi) on YouTube

The soundtrack album includes five tracks composed by A. R. Rahman, and was released in 1996 by Pyramid & Sony Music India. The soundtrack was also released in Hindi as Hindustani by Tips Industries and in Telugu as Bharateeyudu by T-Series. The lyrics were written by Vaali and Vairamuthu for the original version, Mehboob & P. K. Mishra for Hindustani and Bhuvanachandra for Bharateeyudu.

The Tamil soundtrack of Indian was a major success, having sold about 600,000 records within days of release. The Hindi soundtrack, called Hindustani, sold a further 1.8 million units, bringing total sales to at least 2.4 million units.

All lyrics are written by Vaalee, except where noted.

Track listing for Indian (Tamil)
| No. | Title | Singer(s) | Length |
|---|---|---|---|
| 1. | "Maya Machindra" | S. P. Balasubrahmanyam, Swarnalatha | 5:37 |
| 2. | "Akadanu Naanga" | Swarnalatha | 5:44 |
| 3. | "Kappaleri Poyaachu" | S. P. Balasubrahmanyam, P. Susheela | 6:28 |
| 4. | "Pachai Kiligal" | K. J. Yesudas, Nirmala Seshadri | 5:50 |
| 5. | "Telephone Manipol" (Lyrics:Vairamuthu) | Hariharan, Harini, Srinivas | 6:15 |

All lyrics are written by Mehboob & P. K. Mishra.

Track listing for Hindustani (Hindi)
| No. | Title | Singer(s) | Length |
|---|---|---|---|
| 1. | "Latka Dikha Diya Humne" | Swarnalatha | 5:44 |
| 2. | "Maya Mahindra" | S. P. Balasubrahmanyam, Swarnalatha | 5:37 |
| 3. | "Pyaare Panchhi" | K. J. Yesudas, Nirmala Seshadri | 5:50 |
| 4. | "Telephone Dhoon Me" | Hariharan, Kavita Krishnamurthy, Srinivas | 6:15 |
| 5. | "Kashtiyaan Bhi" | S. P. Balasubrahmanyam, Sadhana Sargam | 6:28 |
| 6. | "Latka Dikha Diya Humne (version-2)" | Suchitra Krishnamurthy | 5:48 |

All lyrics are written by Bhuvanachandra.

Track listing for Bharateeyudu (Telugu)
| No. | Title | Singer(s) | Length |
|---|---|---|---|
| 1. | "Adireti" | Swarnalatha | 5:44 |
| 2. | "Maya Mahindra" | S. P. Balasubrahmanyam, Swarnalatha | 5:37 |
| 3. | "Pachani Chilukalu" | K. J. Yesudas, Nirmala Seshadri | 5:50 |
| 4. | "Telephone Dhwani La" | Hariharan, Harini, Srinivas | 6:15 |
| 5. | "Teppalelli Poyaka" | S. P. Balasubrahmanyam, Sujatha Mohan | 6:28 |

== Release ==
Indian was released on 9 May 1996. Prior to the release of the film, the team also planned a Hindi version of the film. It was partially reshot in the language as Hindustani with Aruna Irani in place of Manorama. Hindustani did well after its release on 23 August 1996. The film was also dubbed in Telugu as Bharathyeedu and in Malayalam under the same title. In 2015, the Hindi version Hindustani was screened at the Habitat Film Festival.

== Reception ==
=== Box office ===
Indian became a major box office success by grossing over ₹61 crore (US$6.5 million) worldwide. Both the Telugu and Hindi dubbed versions also emerged successful.

=== Critical response ===
Nirupama Subramanian from India Today praised Shankar's script, noting that "with the right mix of pop patriotism, anti-establishment diatribes and other commercial cinema ingredients, Shankar's latest creation has south India applauding" before adding that "the real triumph of the film is the effective make-over that believably transforms the actors". Tharamani of Kalki praised the film for depicting romance in a dignified manner, narrating flashbacks in black-and-white and keeping the beauty shining and budding everywhere without being blinded but criticising the film for giving a wrong message of justifying the murders. The Hindu wrote, "Shankar establishes himself as one who thinks big and executes what his mind has conceived in a lavish style on the screen be it the dance sequences or action and thrills the Tamil viewers have not witnessed before". The critic added, "Kamal is simply superb as Senapathy, his thick voice and the dhoti-jubba attire adding to his portrayal. As Chandru he underplays his part".

=== Accolades ===
Indian was selected by India as its entry for the Best Foreign Language Film for the Academy Awards in 1996, but was not nominated.

List of awards and nominations
| Award | Date of ceremony | Category | Nominee(s) | Result | Ref. |
|---|---|---|---|---|---|
| National Film Awards | July 1997 | Best Actor | Kamal Haasan | Won | |
| National Film Awards | July 1997 | Best Art Direction | Thota Tharani | Won | |
| National Film Awards | July 1997 | Best Special Effects | S. T. Venky | Won | |
| Tamil Nadu State Film Awards | – | Best Film (First prize) | A. M. Rathnam as a producer | Won | |
| Tamil Nadu State Film Awards | – | Best Actor | Kamal Haasan | Won | |
| Filmfare Awards South | 30 August 1997 | Best Film – Tamil | A. M. Rathnam as a producer | Won | |
| Filmfare Awards South | 30 August 1997 | Best Actor – Tamil | Kamal Haasan | Won | |

== Re-release ==
Indian was re-released on 7 June 2024, in over 600 screens worldwide.

== Sequels ==
A sequel Indian 2 again directed by Shankar and starring Haasan was released on 12 July 2024. A third film was shot alongside Indian 2; the film, titled Indian 3, was still in production as of mid-2024. In 2008, Shankar planned on a crossover film featuring characters from Indian, Mudhalvan (1999) and Sivaji: The Boss (2007), but dropped the idea due to lack of encouragement from his assistant directors.

== In popular culture ==
Senthil reprised the role of Panneerselvam in the 2008 film Satyam.

== See also ==
- List of Indian submissions for the Academy Award for Best International Feature Film
- List of submissions to the 69th Academy Awards for Best Foreign Language Film

== Bibliography ==
- Dhananjayan, G. (2014). Pride of Tamil Cinema: 1931–2013. Blue Ocean Publishers. OCLC 898765509.
