= S. Shankar =

Indian filmmaker (born 1963)

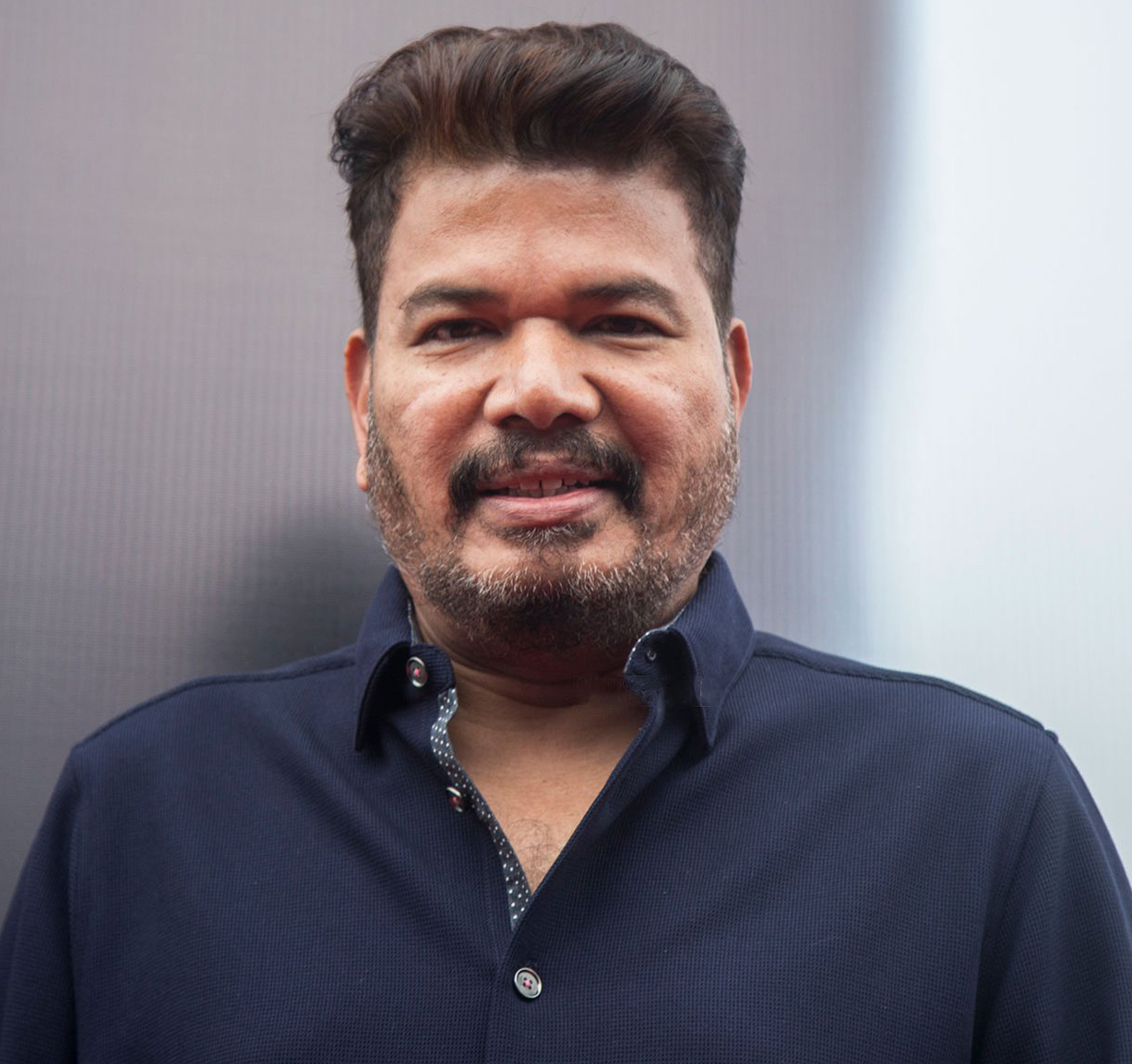
- Shankar in 2018
- Born: Shankar Shanmugam; 17 August 1963 (age 63); Kumbakonam, Madras State (present-day Tamil Nadu), India
- Education: Central Polytechnic College
- Occupations: Film director, film producer, screenwriter
- Years active: 1993–present
- Spouse: Easwari Shankar
- Children: 3

Shankar Shanmugam (born 17 August 1963) is an Indian film director, producer, and screenwriter, primarily known for his work in Tamil cinema. He is one of the most prominent directors of Indian cinema, he has also worked in Hindi and Telugu films. Shankar's films are known for addressing contemporary social issues, vigilante themes, and use of visual effects. Throughout his career, he has won several awards, including one National Film Award, four Filmfare Award South, and six Tamil Nadu State Film Awards. Additionally, six of his films have won the National Film Award for Best Special Effects.

Shankar made his debut as a director in the film Gentleman (1993), for which he won the Filmfare Best Director Award and the Tamil Nadu State Film Award for Best Director. He usually collaborates with composer A. R. Rahman, both having done over 11 films together. Some of his films like Indian (1996) and Jeans (1998) were commercially very successful and were submitted by India for the Academy Award for Best Foreign Language Film, but neither earned a nomination. He was awarded an honorary doctorate by M. G. R. University.

Shankar's psychological thriller Anniyan was released in 2005 with highly critical and commercial success. After Anniyan, Shankar teamed up with Rajinikanth on Sivaji (2007), the most expensive Indian film at that time. He again collaborated with Rajinikanth for the science fiction film Enthiran (2010), which again turned out to be highest grossing Tamil film at that time and also its sequel 2.0 (2018), is the 15th highest-grossing film in India and the 18th highest-grossing Indian film worldwide. It is also the highest-grossing Indian film of 2018.

== Early life ==
Shankar was born on 17 August 1963 in Kumbakonam, Thanjavur district, Tamil Nadu to Muthulakshmi and Shanmugam. He completed his diploma in mechanical engineering from Central Polytechnic College and worked in a typewriting company before entering the film industry. He was roped into the film industry as a screenwriter by S. A. Chandrasekhar, who accidentally saw the drama stage shows made by Shankar and his team. Though Shankar wanted to be an actor, he chose to be a director instead.

== Career ==
=== 1985-1990: Early work before directorial ===
Shankar was a wannabe actor who, after small and unnoticed roles in two films such Vesham (1985) and Poovum Puyalum (1986), eventually grabbed the opportunity to assist directors S. A. Chandrasekhar and Pavithran. He began his career as an actor in the films Vasantha Raagam (1986), Neethikku Thandanai (1987) and Seetha (1990).

=== 1993-2002: Debut and breakthrough ===
Shankar's directorial debut was supposed to be Azhagiya Kuyilae, which found no producer willing to finance it. In 1993, he made his directional debut through Gentleman, starring Arjun Sarja in the lead role. The film was made with a higher-than-average budget in Tamil cinema during that time. It received a positive response and became a blockbuster. A. R. Rahman, the film's music composer, continued to work with Shankar in his next six directorial ventures.

Shankar's second film, Kaadhalan, a romantic thriller film, released the following year and featured Prabhu Deva in the lead role. In 1996, he collaborated with Kamal Haasan for Indian. It was dubbed in Hindi as Hindustani and Telugu as Bharateeyudu. The film was selected as the country's submission for the Academy Award for Best Foreign Language Film. Following Indian, Shankar began work on Jeans, which released in 1998 and became the most expensive film in Indian cinema at that time with a budget of ₹ 200 million. Upon release, it became one of the highest grossing Tamil films of the 1990s. He made his production debut through Mudhalvan (1999), where he collaborated with Arjun Sarja for the second time as lead actor. The film was a hit at the box office.

Shankar opted to remake Mudhalvan in Hindi as Nayak, thus making his Bollywood debut. Nayak released in September 2001 and was declared a flop by Box Office India due to its poor marketing, high budget, and distribution price. It went on to gain cult status from repeated telecasts despite not doing well at the box office. Shankar started work on his next film, which was supposed to be a science fiction film titled Robot that was slated to have Kamal Haasan in the lead. The project was stalled since Haasan was busy with other projects. Later, the project could not move forward due to budgeting problems.

=== 2003-2018: Widespread success ===
Shankar's coming-of-age musical film Boys released in 2003. It received mixed reviews from the critics and audience, resulting in average business. However, A. R. Rahman's soundtrack for the film became a major sensation. On the box office front, the Telugu-dubbed version of Boys was a hit in Andhra Pradesh.

Shankar's psychological thriller Anniyan, featuring Vikram in three distinct characters (Ambi, Remo and Anniyan), was released in 2005. Shankar collaborated with composer Harris Jayaraj for the first time. Anniyan turned out to become the second-highest grossing Tamil film of 2005.

Shortly after the release of Anniyan, it was reported that Shankar had teamed up with Rajinikanth and AVM Productions for a film. He renewed his association with A. R. Rahman for the film. Sivaji was made at a budget of ₹ 600 million, the most expensive Indian film to that point. He was paid a record salary of ₹100 million for the film. After two years of filming, the film released in 2007 and ultimately became one of the highest grossing Tamil films of that time.

Following Sivaji, Shankar revisited the possibilities of opinion regarding the script of Robot. He later decided to make the project in Tamil with Rajinikanth and Aishwarya Rai. The film was produced by South Indian media proprietor, Kalanithi Maran, was renamed Enthiran, and was made on a budget of ₹1.32 billion, which was again the most expensive Indian film to that point. Some reports also make it one of the highest grossing Tamil films of the time.

Shankar started to work on Nanban, the Tamil remake of the 2009 Hindi film 3 Idiots starring Vijay, Jiiva and Srikanth. The film opened in January 2012. After Nanban, it was wrongly reported that Shankar's next film would be called Therdal.

On 21 June 2012, Shankar announced his next film titled I. A romantic thriller, Vikram essayed the roles of a bodybuilder, fashion model, and hunchback. It was his second collaboration with Shankar after Anniyan. The film, made over a period of 2.5 years, released on 14 January 2015 to mixed-to-positive reviews and earned almost ₹2 billion in 19 days.

Shankar then started working on 2.0, a sequel to Enthiran, which released on 29 November 2018 and received positive to mixed reviews. It went on to become the highest-grossing Indian film of 2018 as well as the seventh highest-grossing Indian film of all time at release. To date, the film is still the highest-grossing Tamil film of all time.

=== 2019-present: Commercial expansion ===
Shankar then began work on Indian 2, the sequel to Indian, reuniting with Kamal Haasan. It was produced by Lyca Productions, marking the production company's second collaboration with Shankar after 2.0. However, due to Haasan contesting the 2019 Indian general election, an accident on the sets, and the COVID-19 pandemic, production was stalled.

In February 2021, Shankar announced his debut in Telugu cinema, Game Changer, starring Ram Charan and Kiara Advani; with the story written by Karthik Subbaraj. It was produced by Dil Raju under Sri Venkateswara Creations.

In April 2021, he also announced his return to Hindi cinema with Ranveer Singh, a remake of Anniyan. It was to be produced by Jayantilal Gada under Pen Studios. However, Shankar faced legal difficulties regarding rights to remake the film, and the production never commenced.

Production on Game Changer began, and after Haasan became available following the release of Vikram, Shankar stated that he will work on and direct both Game Changer and Indian 2 simultaneously. During filming of Indian 2, it was decided that the film would be split into two parts due to the length of the material. Both parts were simultaneously shot. Indian 2 was released on 12 July 2024. It was panned by critics and audiences alike. It also included a teaser for Indian 3, which was better received.

Game Changer was released on 10 January 2025, coinciding with Sankranti. It opened to mixed reviews from critics and audiences alike. Both Indian 2 and Game Changer were commercially unsuccessful.

Indian 3 was scheduled to be released on 24 January 2025, but is currently undergoing reshoots due to the panning of its predecessor. However, it remains unreleased.

== Personal life ==
Shankar is married to Easwari Shankar. The couple has two daughters and a son. Their younger daughter, Aditi Shankar, made her acting debut with Viruman (2022). In April 2024, Shankar's older daughter Aishwarya's second marriage was with Tarun Karthikeyan, after her divorce from cricketer Damodaran Rohit. Shankar's son Arjith Shankar is also an aspiring actor.

== Filmography ==
Key
†	Denotes films that have not yet been released

- Note: all films are in Tamil, unless otherwise noted.

=== As director ===
- Note: He is credited in films as Shankar.

List of S. Shankar film credits as director
Year	Title	Languages	Notes
1993	Gentleman	Tamil	
1994	Kaadhalan	Tamil	Also lyricist for "Pettai Rap"
1996	Indian	Tamil	
1998	Jeans	Tamil	
1999	Mudhalvan	Tamil	
2001	Nayak: The Real Hero	Hindi	Hindi film debut; Remake of Mudhalvan (1999)
2003	Boys	Tamil	
2005	Anniyan	Tamil	
2007	Sivaji: The Boss	Tamil	
2010	Enthiran	Tamil	
2012	Nanban	Tamil	Remake of 3 Idiots (2009)
2015	I	Tamil	
2018	2.0	Tamil	Sequel of Enthiran (2010)
2024	Indian 2	Tamil	Sequel of Indian (1996)
2025	Game Changer	Telugu	Telugu film debut
2027	Indian 3 †	Tamil	Delayed; Sequel of Indian 2 (2024)

=== As producer ===
List of S. Shankar film credits as producer
Year	Title	Notes			
Year	Title	Notes	1999	Mudhalvan	As producer
2004	Kaadhal				As producer
2006	Imsai Arasan 23am Pulikesi				As producer
2006	Veyil				As producer
2007	Kalloori				As producer
2008	Arai Enn 305-il Kadavul				As producer
2009	Eeram				As producer
2010	Rettaisuzhi				As producer
2010	Anandhapurathu Veedu				As producer
2014	Kappal	As distributor			
2023	Aneethi	As distributor			

=== As an actor ===
List of S. Shankar film credits as actor
Year	Title	Role	Notes
1985	Vesham	Worker	
1986	Poovum Puyalum	Student	
1986	Vasantha Raagam	Printing press worker	
1987	Neethikku Thandanai	Reporter	
1990	Seetha	Japan	
1994	Kaadhalan	Spectator	Uncredited appearance in the song "Kadhalikum Pennin"
2002	Kadhal Virus	Himself	Special appearance
2007	Sivaji: The Boss	Person who telephones	Uncredited appearance in the song "Balleilakka"
2010	Enthiran	Army soldier	Uncredited appearance
2012	Nanban	Director	Uncredited appearance in the song "Asku Laska"

== Awards and nominations ==
=== National Film Awards ===
List of S. Shankar National Film Awards and Nominations
Year	Film	Category	Result	Ref.
2006	Veyil	National Film Award for Best Feature Film in Tamil	Won	

=== Filmfare Awards South ===
List of S. Shankar Filmfare Awards South awards and nominations
Year	Film	Category	Result	Ref.
1993	Gentleman	Best Director	Won	
1994	Kaadhalan	Best Director	Won	
2005	Anniyan	Best Director	Won	
2006	Veyil	Best Film – Tamil	Won	
2007	Sivaji: The.Boss	Best Director	Nominated	
2010	Enthiran	Best Director	Nominated	
2015	I	Best Director	Nominated	

=== Tamil Nadu State Film Awards ===
List of S. Shankar Tamil Nadu State Film Awards and nominations
Year	Film	Category	Result	Ref.
1993	Gentleman	Best Director	Won	
1996	Indian	Best Film (First prize)	Won	
2005	Anniyan	Best Film (Second prize)	Won	
2005	Anniyan	Best Director	Won	
2006	Veyil	Best Film (First prize)	Won	
2007	Sivaji: The.Boss	Best Film (First prize)	Won	

=== Vijay Awards ===
List of S. Shankar Vijay Awards and nominations
Year	Film	Category	Result	Ref.
2010	Enthiran: The Robot	Favourite Director	Won	
2013	Chevalier Sivaji Ganesan Award for Excellence in Indian Cinema		Won	

=== Ananda Vikatan Cinema Awards ===
List of S. Shankar Ananda Vikatan Cinema Awards and nominations
Year	Film	Category	Result	Ref.
2018	2.0	Best Animation and Visual Effect	Won	
