= National Film Award for Best VFX Supervisor =

Indian film award

National Film Award for Best Special Effects
- National award for contributions to Indian Cinema
- Awarded for: Best special graphic effects for a feature film for a year
- Sponsored by: Directorate of Film Festivals
- Rewards: Rajat Kamal (Silver Lotus); ₹50,000
- First award: 1992
- Final award: 2021
- Most recent winner: V. Srinivas Mohan, RRR

Highlights
- Total awarded: 29
- First winner: Shashilal K. Nair

The National Film Award for Best Special Effects was one of the National Film Awards presented annually by the Directorate of Film Festivals, the organisation set up by Ministry of Information and Broadcasting, India. It was one of several awards presented for feature films and awarded with Rajat Kamal (Silver Lotus). At the 70th National Film Awards, the category was combined with Best Animated Film, with two categories, one for the producer and director, and the other one for visual effects supervisor, named Best AVGC Film.

The award was instituted in 1991 at 39th National Film Awards but awarded first time at 40th National Film Awards and then awarded annually for films produced in the year across the country, in all Indian languages. As of 2020, twenty six feature films have been awarded which are made in five different languages: Tamil (ten), Hindi (seven), Telugu (seven), Malayalam (two), and Kannada (one).

== Winners ==
Award includes 'Rajat Kamal' (Silver Lotus) and cash prize. Following are the award winners over the years:

List of award recipients, showing the year (award ceremony), film(s) and language(s)
| Year | Recipient(s) | Film(s) | Language(s) | Refs. |
|---|---|---|---|---|
| 1991 (39th) | No Award | | | |
| 1992 (40th) | Shashilal K. Nair | Angaar | Hindi | |
| 1993 (41st) | Sethu | Thiruda Thiruda | Tamil | |
| 1994 (42nd) | C. Murugesh | Kaadhalan | Tamil | |
| 1994 (42nd) | S. T. Venki | Kaadhalan | Tamil | |
| 1995 (43rd) | S. T. Venki | Kaalapani | Malayalam | |
| 1996 (44th) | S. T. Venki | Indian | Tamil | |
| 1997 (45th) | No Award | | | |
| 1998 (46th) | S. T. Venki | Jeans | Tamil | |
| 1999 (47th) | Mantra | Hey Ram | Tamil | |
| 2000 (48th) | No Award | | | |
| 2001 (49th) | N. Madhusudhanan | Aalavandhan | Tamil | |
| 2002 (50th) | Indian Artists | Magic Magic | Tamil | |
| 2003 (51st) | Bimmini Special Fx Design Studios • James Colmer • Lara Denman | Koi... Mil Gaya | Hindi | |
| 2003 (51st) | Digital Art Media • Marc Kolbe • Craig Mumma | Koi... Mil Gaya | Hindi | |
| 2004 (52nd) | Sanath (Firefly Digital) | Anji | Telugu | |
| 2005 (53rd) | Tata Elxsi | Anniyan | Tamil | |
| 2006 (54th) | EFX, Chennai | Krrish | Hindi | |
| 2007 (55th) | Indian Artists | Sivaji | Tamil | |
| 2008 (56th) | Govardhan (Tata Elxsi) | Mumbai Meri Jaan | Hindi | |
| 2009 (57th) | R. C. Kamal Kannan | Magadheera | Telugu | |
| 2010 (58th) | V. Srinivas Mohan | Enthiran | Tamil | |
| 2011 (59th) | Red Chillies VFX • Harry Hingorani • Keitan Yadav | Ra.One | Hindi | |
| 2012 (60th) | Makuta VFX | Eega | Telugu | |
| 2013 (61st) | Intermezzo Studio Alien Sense Films Pvt Ltd | Jal | Hindi | |
| 2014 (62nd) | No Award | | | |
| 2015 (63rd) | V. Srinivas Mohan | Baahubali: The Beginning | Telugu | |
| 2016 (64th) | Naveen Paul | Shivaay | Hindi | |
| 2017 (65th) | R. C. Kamal Kannan | Baahubali 2: The Conclusion | Telugu | |
| 2018 (66th) | Srushti Creative Studio | Awe | Telugu | |
| 2018 (66th) | Unifi Media | KGF: Chapter 1 | Kannada | |
| 2019 (67th) | Siddharth Priyadarshan | Marakkar: Lion of the Arabian Sea | Malayalam | |
| 2020 (68th) | No Award | | | |
| 2021 (69th) | V. Srinivas Mohan | RRR | Telugu | |
