= The Oath of the Vayuputras =

2013 novel by Amish Tripathi

- Author: Amish Tripathi
- Cover artist: Rashmi Pusalkar
- Language: English
- Series: Shiva trilogy
- Subject: Shiva, Myth, Fantasy
- Genre: Fiction
- Publisher: Westland Press
- Publication date: 27 February 2013
- Publication place: India
- Media type: Print (Paperback)
- Pages: 565
- ISBN: 9789382618348
- Preceded by: The Secret of the Nagas

The Oath of the Vayuputras is the third book of Amish Tripathi, third book of Amishverse, and also the third book of Shiva Trilogy. The book was released on 27 February 2013, through Westland Press and completes the mythical story about an imaginary land Meluha and how its inhabitants were saved by a barbarian named Shiva. Starting from where the previous installment left off, Shiva discovers what is the true evil in The Oath of the Vayuputras. Shiva then declares a holy war on those who seek to continue to use it, mainly the Emperors Daksha and Dilipa, who are being controlled by the sage Bhrigu. The battle rages on and Shiva travels to the land of Pariha to consult with Vayuputras, a legendary tribe. By the time he returns, the war has ended with Sati, his wife, being murdered. An enraged Shiva destroys the capital of Meluha and Somras is wiped out of history. The story concludes with Shiva and his associates being popularized as Gods for their deeds and accomplishments.

Tripathi had confirmed in September 2011 that he was writing The Oath of the Vayuputras, with Westland announcing the release date as 27 February 2013. The book was longer than the previous installments of the series and Tripathi clarified that all the loose ends left out in the previous book would be addressed, with the death of certain characters. Following the release of the cover art, it was announced that the publication rights of the books have been bought by both US and UK publisher houses. Like The Immortals of Meluha and The Secret of the Nagas, the book contained innovative marketing techniques, including launching interactive apps, merchandise and a music album titled Vayuputras, containing music inspired by different events in the series.

After its release, The Oath of the Vayuputras received positive reviews for the story and characterisation with Business Standard calling Tripathi 'India's Tolkien'. However, his continued insistence on using modern, easy English gave way to a negative review by Mint. The book was a commercial success with 350,000 copies for pre-order, and an initial print-run of 500,000 copies. On the first day of the release itself, the book sold the initial print-run breaking the record for the fastest selling book in India. This prompted Westland to pay Tripathi an advance amount of ₹5 crore (US$520,000) for Tripathi's next book series. As of June 2015 over 2.5 million copies of the Shiva Trilogy have been sold with gross retail sales of over ₹60 crore (US$6.2 million), making it the fastest selling book series in the history of Indian publishing.

== Plot ==
On meeting Brahaspati at the Naga capital of Panchavati, Shiva learns of the evil "Somras", and its ill effects on the people of India. Brahaspati explains that the large amounts of water required to manufacture Somras has resulted in the depletion of the Saraswati River's water. The waste generated in the process of manufacturing the Somras was dumped in the Tsangpo river, which flows through Branga territory as Brahmaputra, and resulted in their disastrous plague. Also the birth of Naga babies was credited to Somras as it results in the multiplication of cells at a very high rate which lead to their deformation and outgrowths.

Shiva travels to the hidden city of Ujjain along with his entourage to meet the chief of Vasudev pandits, Gopal. Gopal explains how the Vayuputra council—an ancient tribe left by the previous Mahadev Lord Rudra, dwelling in remote land of Pariha in the West—train a member of their tribe as the Neelkanth when "evil" rises. Shiva comes to the conclusion that it was his uncle Manobhu, who turns out to be a former Vayuputra member, trained him as Neelkanth. Seeing that Meluha is the center of manufacturing the Somras, Shiva declares a holy war on the Kingdom and appeals the people to stop using the drink. Parvateshwar decides to join Meluha, since he thinks that it is his duty to defend his motherland; Anandamayi joins him. Shiva also realizes that Maharishi Bhrigu is the mastermind behind the attack on Panchavati, plotting against him along with the Swadweepan emperor Dilipa and Daksha. The preparation for the war mobilizes as Branga, Vaishali and Kashi come to Shiva's aid. He takes the Nagas, the Brangas and the Vasudev elephant corps to attack Meluha, while Kartik and Ganesh attack Ayodhya and successfully prevent them from aiding Meluha. Shiva captures the city of Mrittikavatti and makes the citizens imprison the Meluhan army led by Vidyunmali, who believes Shiva to be a fraud. He escapes and persuades Bhrigu and Parvateshwar to attack Sati's army by a thousand Meluhan troops, and defeat them.

Following this defeat, Shiva abandons the plan of invading Meluha and leaves for Pariha with Gopal; they wanted to procure the deadly Brahmastra weapon, to threaten the Meluhans for peace with them. There he meets the chief of Vayuputras, Mithra, who turns out to be his maternal uncle. Mithra convinces the Vayuputras that Shiva is the real Neelkanth and gives him the Pashupathiastra which acts on a specific target, rather than annihilating everything like the Brahmastra. Meanwhile, Parvateshwar uses decoy ships to give an impression to Kali that he was going to attack Panchavati. Alarmed, Kali takes the bait and leaves with the finest Naga soldiers in their pursuit. However, she realizes her folly and returns.

Daksha plans to assassinate Shiva and sends Vidyunmali to get Egyptian assassins. He frames a peace treaty for Shiva but in his absence, Sati attends the peace conference and learns the truth. She fights the assassins valiantly, but is killed. The war ends with Sati's death, but an enraged Shiva decides to use the Pashupatiastra to finish Devagiri forever. Parvateshwar, Anandmayi, Veerini decide to stay back in the city and die with it, but Kartik persuades Bhrigu to remain alive and share his vast knowledge with future generations. Shiva unleashes the astra and ends Devagiri's history, along with the Somras manufacturing units hidden beneath the city.

In the epilogue, Shiva retires to Mount Kailash where he lives the rest of his days peacefully, though missing Sati every day. Ganesh, Kali and Kartik become renowned as Gods for their prowess, all over India. They take revenge for Sati's death by wiping out the whole clan of the Egyptian assassins. Bhrigu continues teaching and collates his knowledge in a book called Bhrigu Samhita. Sati's death is not forgotten and she is later renowned as Goddess Shakti. It is revealed that in order to ensure that the Somras is not mass-manufactured again, the course of the Yamuna is turned towards the east, thus drying up the Saraswati River.

== Characters and locations ==
Tripathi believes that "Myths are nothing but jumbled memories of a true past. A past buried under mounds of earth and ignorance." The book has known characters from Hindu texts as well as those born from Tripathi's imagination, however the characters from the Hinduism do not inherit all of their classical traits.

=== Characters ===
- Shiva – The main character in the story. He is a Tibetan immigrant to Meluha and the chief of the Guna tribe. On arriving in Meluha and consuming the Somras (a potion), his throat turns blue making him the Neelkanth of the Meluhan legend, which speaks of the appearance of Neelkanth as a destroyer of evil. The Meluhans end up believing that Shiva would be their saviour. Shiva searches for the source of Evil, and deciding that it is Somras which would destroy India, he declares war to eradicate the drink completely. His deeds and accomplishments to save India from its dangers makes him the Mahadev (Great God).
- Sati – A Meluhan princess, she is the daughter of King Daksha. Shiva falls in love with her and marries her. Sati is a skilled swords-woman and is very brave since childhood. She assists Shiva on his journey to destroy Evil, but dies a valiant death while saving her people from a group of assassins. Her death becomes a trigger for the wars to cease. She is later renowned as Goddess Shakti, and her ashes are spread throughout India, in places later known as Shakta pithas (Seat of Shakti).
- Kali – Sati's twin sister who was separated from her after birth, due to their father denouncing her. Kali was born with two extra functioning appendages, hence she was ostracized from society and declared a Naga. A hot-tempered woman, Kali assists and helps Shiva in his journey to destroy Evil. Kali is later renowned as a Goddess.
- Ganesh – Sati's first child, who was declared dead by her father Daksha, as he was born with physical deformities. Ganesh was raised later by Kali, and they created the formidable Naga army. Ganesh becomes an ardent follower of Shiva and Sati, and later comes to be renowned as a God.
- Kartik – Son of Shiva and Sati, Kartik is a fearsome warrior and gains recognition for his battle skills and strategies. Kartik recognizes the importance of preserving Shiva's legacy by not destroying everything in Meluha. He later moves to South India and is renowned as a God there.
- Nandi – A captain in the Meluhan army. A loyal devotee of Shiva, who is often considered for his opinion and suggestions by Shiva.
- Veer Bhadra – A captain of Shiva's army and his close childhood friend. He was later renamed as Veer Bhadra, a title earned by once defeating a tiger single-handedly. He is quick tempered and is husband to Krittika.
- Krittika — She is the best friend and hand maiden of Sati. She is like a second mother to Kartik and is married to Shiva's best friend Veer Bhadra. She does not have children as she has become infertile due to the adverse effects of Somras.
- Bŗahaspati – The chief Meluhan scientist who becomes good friend. Though he does not believe the legend of the Neelkanth, he believes that Shiva is capable of taking Meluha to its new glory.
- Daksha – The King of the Meluhans, he wants to be the Emperor of the whole of India, and is bitter towards Shiva for bringing into light his injustices against his own daughter, Sati.
- Veerini – The Queen of the Meluhans, wife of Emperor Daksha, Veerini is against Daksha's diabolical schemes to bring down Shiva.
- Parvateshvar – Head of Meluhan Army and a Suryavanshi, Parvateshvar is a follower of Shiva. However, he is caught in a dilemma when Shiva decides to destroy Meluha for ending the usage of Somras, and ultimately decides to help the country by leading it in the impending war, being bound to his duty as the protector of the country. He is a man of his word and places truth and honour even above God. He is a tall, well-built giant of a man and is husband to Princess Anandamayi.
- Bhagirath – The prince of Ayodhya, he assists Shiva in his journey to destroy Evil.
- Anandamayi – The princess of Ayodhya. A strong-willed woman, Anandamayi joins Parvateshwar as he decides to lead Meluha in the war.
- Ayurvati – The Chief of Medicine, Ayurvati is another intelligent and revered woman, who is capable of curing any disease. She is the first one to realize that Shiva is the "Neelkanth", their savior.
- Bhrigu – Bhrigu is a renowned sage of India, who is extremely powerful and malevolent. He believes that the Somras is never Evil, and hence mobilizes the war against Shiva. Held in high-esteem and fear by everyone, Bhrigu realizes the error of his ways after Sati is killed.
- Dilipa – King of Ayodhya and the father of Bhagirath and Anadamayi, Dilipa is obsessed about his looks and decaying body, and is black-mailed by Bhrigu in helping him in the impending war against Shiva.
- Gopal – The chief of the Vasudevs, Gopal assists Shiva throughout his journey from the hidden city of Ujjain, to Pariha, the land of the Vayuputras.
- Kanakhala – Meluhan prime minister, Kanakhala is shocked at the criminal side and dark revelations about her King Daksha, and never supported him in his misdeeds. When she discovers Daksha's plans to kill Shiva, she stealthily informs Parvateshvar about his plans and kills herself.
- Parshuram- He was a Bandit-Priest purely devoted to Shiva. He is a courageous man and will fight till his last breath for the Lord Neelkanth.
- Tara-Lover of Brahaspati; they loved each other but were separated.

=== Races ===
- Suryavanshis – The Suryavanshis are followers of Shri Ram and the Solar Calendar and try to lead a life that is as ideal as possible. The Suryavanshis believe in Satya, Dharma, Maan—truth, duty and honor.
- Chandravanshis – The Chandravanshis are followers of the Lunar Calendar. Traditionally the Chandravanshis and Suryavanshis are enemies.
- Naga – A cursed race of people who have physical deformities. They are extremely skilled warriors.
- Vasudevs – The Vasudevs are a secretive group of priests, who wait through the millennia to assist the Neelkanth in destroying Evil.
- Vayuputras – The Vayuputras are a secret group of followers left by the previous Mahadev, Lord Rudra. Staying in remote Pariha, the Vayuputras are responsible for the creation of the Neelkanth, when Evil approaches.

=== Kingdoms ===
- Meluha – The empire of the Suryavanshis, also known as the land of pure life. Meluha is based in the areas of the modern Indian provinces of Kashmir, Punjab, Himachal Pradesh, Delhi, Haryana, Rajasthan, Gujarat and the whole of Pakistan. It also includes parts of eastern Afghanistan.
- Swadweep – The empire of the Chandravanshis, also known as the island of the individual. Swadweep comprises the modern Indian provinces of Uttarakhand, Uttar Pradesh, Bihar, Jharkhand, West Bengal, Sikkim, Assam, Meghalaya and all of the country of Bangladesh, besides most parts of Nepal and Bhutan.
- Brangaridai – The land of the Brangas, situated on the eastern part of India. Shiva travels there with his entourage in search of the recipe for a medicine and to know the truth about the Nagas.
- Dandak Forest – Located in the modern Indian province of Maharashtra and parts of Andhra Pradesh, Karnataka, Chhattisgarh, Orissa and Madhya Pradesh, Dandak is a dense and treacherous forest where the Nagas stay, at their capital Panchavati.
- Ujjain – A circular city situated beside the Chambal River and hidden completely to the outsiders, Ujjain is the home of the Vasudevs. Shiva travels there for counselling and asking their help.
- Pariha – Situated in far West, Pariha is the home of the Vayuputras. A secluded city formed from the Mesopotemian civilization, Pariha is the birthplace of Lord Rudra. Shiva travels there with Gopal for asking their help.

Characters and locations adapted as per the books from the series and from the official website.

== Development and release ==
"It's been an unbelievable, almost surreal journey. The Immortals of Meluha was the first piece of fiction that I wrote. Becoming an author was not a scenario in any of my childhood fantasies. However, being academically inclined, I chose to graduate in Science rather than History or English Literature, and then went on to do my MBA, as it seemed a practical life-choice to make. And yet, here I am, actually making my living from writing. It's all because of Lord Shiva's blessings."

— Tripathi talking about his journey as an author

Tripathi had initially decided to write a book on philosophy, but was dissuaded by his family members, so he wrote a book on Shiva, one of the Hindu gods. The story was of how a Tibetan tribal chief called Shiva became the fabled savior of the land of Meluha. His adventures nearly 4000 years ago, morphed into the mythical legends of the Hindu God Shiva. Titled The Immortals of Meluha, the book went on to become a huge commercial success, after its release in February 2010, with film director Karan Johar's Dharma Productions purchasing the film rights of the book. The success prompted Tripathi to pen a second part of the trilogy, titled The Secret of the Nagas. Following what happens in the life of Shiva, the plotline and the geography of the story was expanded to venture into unknown territories. Tripathi quit his job as a banker while writing the book, dedicating his whole time to the marketing and the promotion of the release. The Secret of the Nagas was also a commercial success, with both the books having crossed a print run of a million copies. These books have continued to top the bestseller lists of Nielsen BookScan, with the gross retail sales being impressive at ₹22 crore (US$2.3 million) within two years of publishing.

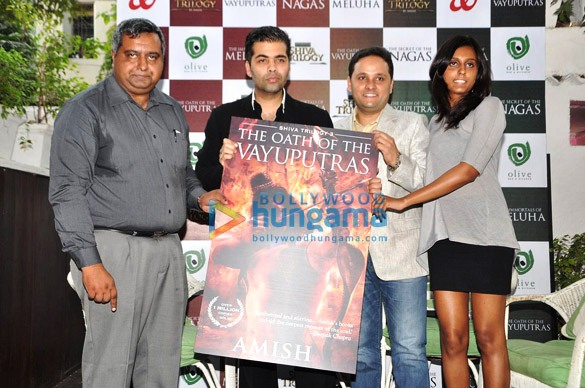
Book cover release party for The Oath of the Vayuputras. From left: Gautam Padmanabhan, CEO of Westland Books, filmmaker Karan Johar, author Amish Tripathi and cover artist Rashmi Pusalkar.

In September 2011, Tripathi confirmed that from the next month he would start penning the third installment of the trilogy, The Oath of the Vayuputras. In January 2013, it was revealed that The Oath of the Vayuputras would be released on 27 February of the same year, by Westland Publishing. Tripathi explained that the final version of the book was longer than he had expected it to be, and consisted of 53 chapters, making it twice as long as the other books. During an interview with The Times of India, the author discussed some of the important scenarios being presented in the book. He explained that since Shiva is a mortal in his series, he would have a fitting epilogue in the book, with many of the loose ends of the plot finally being deciphered. Shiva would meet the chief of the Vasudevas and the Vayuputras in the hidden cities of Ujjain and Pariha. "Some loose ends will be left deliberately open for the readers to interpret. As for losing someone we love? The Shiva trilogy chronicles a battle against evil. And evil does not go quietly into the night; instead, it puts up a strong fight against Good. So yes, people will die in Vayuputras," he concluded.

Explaining that he wrote it as per his whim, and not according to the need to have more philosophy or love or war, Tripathi was sure that The Oath of the Vayuputras would have a tragic ending. During an interview with Daily News and Analysis, Tripathi explained that he had purposefully used the modern terms for the different historical locations described in the book, including calling India by its name, rather than its ancient name, Jambudweep. He did not believe that India could be represented as a political concept in his book, since at the timeline followed in the Shiva trilogy, India was still a cultural concept. Since some of the characters have their mythological names, but do not follow the characteristic traits, Tripathi believed that such development was spontaneous and did not question his writing further. Giving an example, the author said: "When I was writing the first book, I was struggling with the Naga, because I wanted to desperately change his character – that he should be jovial and happy. But he kept ending up as a tormented and troubled a guy who was suffering. And I just had to surrender"

The cover art of the book was launched in Mumbai, by Tripathi and Johar in a ceremony, which also saw the presence of Gautam Padmanabhan, CEO of Westland Publishers, and Rashmi Pusalkar, the designer of the cover of The Oath of the Vayuputras. The author added that Pusalkar had managed to merge in many of the symbolic elements represented in the storyline of the book, while maintaining the same visual appeal of the previous releases of the trilogy. He wanted the cover to have a symbolic meaning, portraying Shiva wielding Pinaka—the legendary bow of the God according to Mythology—and a burning bush behind him. The increasing brightness of the book covers signified the triumph of good over evil, according to Tripathi. The UK publication rights of the Shiva trilogy, including The Oath of the Vayuputras was purchased by Jo Fletcher Books, with the deal being made by Claire Roberts at Trident Media Group, acting on behalf of the author and the author's Indian agent, Anuj Bahri of Red Ink Literary Agency. The Oath of the Vayuputras would be released in the United States in summer 2014. The Oath of the Vayuputras was released in six different languages, namely English (South Asia), English (UK), Hindi, Telugu, Gujarati and Marathi.

== Marketing techniques ==
Since both The Immortals of Meluha and The Secret of the Nagas had innovative marketing techniques, Tripathi spoke about similar innovativeness with the release of The Oath of the Vayuputras. One of the marketing strategies included a music album called Vayuputras, an original soundtrack based on the Shiva Trilogy. The idea for the album came from Sangram Surve, CEO of Tripathi's advertisement agency, Think WhyNot. The album had nine songs dedicated to Lord Shiva with several Bollywood singers lending their voices, and was inspired by the different sections and storyline in the books. Titled "Jo Vayuputra Ho" ("One Who is a Vayuputra"), the lead song was composed by musician Taufiq Qureshi and recorded by singer Sonu Nigam. A music video was also developed by Think WhyNot team, directed by Amit Pandirkar and music by Rajeev Sharma. The video was broadcast in popular television channels and across all social media platforms. The concept of the music video was the journey of the three books of the Shiva Trilogy in its five-minute span. Other marketing strategies included launching interactive apps, merchandise and events that would follow the music and book launch. In an interview with Business Standard, Surve explained:

"After tasting the stupendous marketing success of, The Secrets of the Nagas, we are very excited to partner with Amish for the launch of The Oath of the Vayuputras. The 'think big' brief given to us was apt for the launch of the final book ... The challenge was to not just get existing fans of the franchise to buy The Oath of Vayuputras—that would happen anyway—but to expand the reader base. The campaign idea revolved around creating another 'first-of-its-kind' in book marketing, which this time around turned out to be the production of a world-class music video which is poised at reaching out to the masses through television, in a bid to garner greater awareness about the book."

== Critical response ==
The book received mixed to positive responses from critics. R Krishna from Daily News and Analysis gave a positive review for the book. He observed that the criticism in the second book regarding bad editing and writing has been polished in The Oath of the Vayuputras. He complimented the fact that philosophical discussions in the book is rightly balanced by action sequences, commending the way in which Sati's fight with the assassins is described. Krishna concluded that the different characters of the book make it a good reading and a fitting ending to the series. Phorum Dalal from Mid-Day praised the urban dialect used by Shiva in the book and felt that Tripathi's grip on the whole story is steady and has the reader's undivided attention, ultimately "giving the Trilogy an end it deserves". Sanjeev Sanyal from Business Standard gave a neutral review saying that although the fast-paced and easy style from the earlier books has been retained, it is evident if one goes back and rereads the first few pages of The Immortals of Meluha that Tripathi has become much more comfortable and confident of his writing. "Of course, those whose literary tastes have not outgrown Wren and Martin will still find fault with his use of the English language. For the rest of us, it is delightful to see how Tripathi applies simple language to evoke great battle scenes and extraordinary landscapes".

Aadisht Khanna from Mint was disappointed with the book and gave a negative review. According to him poor grammar and bad editing of the book marred the possibility of The Oath of the Vayuputras becoming a classic. Adding that the scope of imagination was vast and ambitious, Khanna explained that he "really wanted to like this book. But the laziness in editing and rewriting is evident, and unforgivable ... It seems as though Westland Ltd, knowing that it has a guaranteed best-seller on its hands, has decided to be as lazy as possible when it comes to the actual editing." The Kolkata Statesman's Mrityunjay Khurana gave a positive review to the book, saying "Amish has skillfully used Upanishadic, Puranic, Zoroastrian and Buddhist mythological images and their essence in lucid and contemporary language." The review goes on to say that Tripathi had tried to bring out knowledge from the dogma-box approach and that despite the author's much criticized "clunky language and sloppy grammar", the tale reached its goal of attraction the attention towards Mythology and traditions, along with inspiring readers.

== Commercial response ==
According to Zee News, before its official release The Oath of the Vayuputras had about 350,000 copies for pre-order, with an initial print-run of 500,000 copies. On the first day of the release itself, the book sold the initial print-run breaking the record for the fastest selling book in India. This prompted Westland to pay Tripathi an advance amount of ₹5 crore (US$520,000) for the next series that he would pen, even though Tripathi confessed that he did not have any idea regarding the subject that he would pursue for his next endeavor. Padmanabhan clarified that the advance included the book, audio and e-publishing rights for Tripathi's next series, and was only for the South-Asian region and "It's the largest advance we've ever paid, and the largest Indian deal". Anuj Bahri, who was the first publisher for The Immortals of Meluha, said that the deal could go up to US$4 million once they acquire the film, foreign and translation rights for the books. As of June 2015 over 2.5 million copies of the Shiva Trilogy have been sold with gross retail sales of over ₹60 crore (US$6.2 million), making it the fastest selling book series in the history of Indian publishing.
