= Nag =

Nag or NAG may refer to:

== Computers ==
- Nag, a multi user tasklist manager included in Horde (software)
- Numerical Algorithms Group, a software company
  - NAG Numerical Library, numerical analysis software
- Numeric Annotation Glyphs, in computerized chess

== Music ==
- "Nag", a song on Joan Jett's album I Love Rock 'n' Roll
- Stage name of Jan-Erik Romøren of Norwegian band Tsjuder

== Organizations ==
- National Academy of Governance, the civil servant academy operated by the Chinese central government
- Neighbourhood action group, community volunteer groups in the United Kingdom
- Neue Automobil Gesellschaft, a defunct German automobile manufacturer
- Nordic Aviation Group, an Estonian airline company

== People ==
- Manilal Nag (1939–2026), Indian classical sitar player
- Martin Nag, Norwegian writer

== Places ==
- Nag, Iran, a village in Kerman Province
- Nag Hammadi, in Upper Egypt
- Nag River, in India
- Nag Tibba, a mountain in Uttarakhand, India

== Religion ==
- Nag Dhunga, a sacred stone worshiped by the people of Nepal
- Nag Hammadi library, a collection of Gnostic texts discovered in Egypt in 1945
  - Nag Hammadi Codex II, a collection of early Christian Gnostic texts
  - Nag Hammadi Codex XIII, a collection of early Christian Gnostic texts
- Nag Panchami, Hindu snake worship
- Nag Shankar, a temple in the Sonitpur district, India

== Other ==
- Nag, a cobra in Rudyard Kipling's Rikki-Tikki-Tavi
- Nāg, refers to the Indian cobra
- Nag (missile), a third generation "fire and forget" anti-tank missile
- Nag Champa, an Indian fragrance
- Nag Hammadi massacre, a massacre of Coptic Christians in Egypt in 2010
- Nag Nag Nag, a former nightclub in London
- Nag Nathaiya (festival), in Varanasi, India
- Nag Vidarbha Andolan Samiti, a separatist political organization in Maharashtra, India
- Dr. Babasaheb Ambedkar International Airport (IATA code), Nagpur, India
- N-Acetylglucosamine, a biological molecule

== See also ==
- Naga (disambiguation)
- Nāga, a deity in the form of a serpent in Hinduism and Buddhism
  - Ichchadhari Naags, shape-shifting Nāgas in Indian folklore
- Nagi (disambiguation)
- Nago, a city at the Okinawa Island in Japan
- Nagu, a former municipality in Finland
- Nag's Head (disambiguation)
- Nagging
