= Nagaraj =

Nagaraj, Nagraj or Nagaraja or Nagarajan is a male Indian given name and Indian surname. It originates in the Sanskrit: नागराज nagaraja 'king of the nāgas'. It is especially prevalent in southern India and northeastern parts of India.

== People ==
- D. R. Nagaraj (1954–1998), Indian cultural critic and political commentator
- Dingri Nagaraj, Indian actor in the Kannada film industry
- Erode Nagaraj (born 1970), Mridangam player, lecturer in The Music Academy, Chennai
- Indu Nagaraj, Indian playback singer
- Manoranjitham Nagaraj, Indian politician and incumbent member of the Tamil Nadu Legislative Assembly
- Milana Nagaraj (born 1989), Indian film actress
- Nagaraj Gobbargumpi (born 1982), Indian high-jump athlete
- R Umadevi Nagaraj (born 1965), Indian professional player of English billiards and snooker, World Women's Billiards Champion 2012
- Ramakrishnan Nagaraj (born 1953), Indian biochemist and molecular biologist
- Shringar Nagaraj (1939–2013), Kannada actor, cameraman, and producer of India's first silent movie
- V. Nagaraj (born 1962), Malaysian director, producer, distributor and consultant
- Nagaraj chandrasekaran, Entrepreneur born in Chennai 1982

=== Nagaraja ===
- Nagaraja Rao (1914–2004), Indian cricketer and umpire
- Nagaraja Rao Havaldar (born 1959), Indian classical vocalist
- V. Nagaraja (born 1954), Indian microbiologist
- Mamta Patel Nagaraja, American engineer

=== Nagraj ===
- Munishree Nagraj, Indian writer and poet
- Nagraj Manjule (born 1977), Indian filmmaker and screenwriter
- Roopa Nagraj (born 1983), Emirati cricketer

== Fictional characters ==
- Nagraj, fictional superhero appearing in Raj Comics
- Nagaraj, protagonist of R.K. NArayan's 1991 novel The World of Nagaraj
- Nagaray (and variations), snake-prince and lover to lady Himal, from Kashmiri tale Himal and Nagaray
- Nagaraja Cholan, protagonist of the 2013 Indian Tamil film Nagaraja Cholan MA, MLA

== See also ==
- Nagarajan (disambiguation)
- Nagaraj (disambiguation)
- Nagaraja
