= Nagina (disambiguation) =

Nagina is a town in Uttar Pradesh, India.

Nagina may also refer to:

- Nagina (Assembly constituency), Uttar Pradesh, India
- Nagina (Lok Sabha constituency), Uttar Pradesh, India
- Nagina (1951 film), a Hindi Bollywood film
- Nagina (1986 film), a Hindi film
  - Nigahen: Nagina Part II, 1989 film
- Nagina (Jungle Books) or Nagaina, a fictional cobra
- Nagina Masjid (disambiguation), any of the several mosques in India
- Nagina, a female member of the Nāgas or serpent deities of South and Southeast Asia

== See also ==
- Nagina Devi or Naiṇī Devī, the serpent goddess ruling over the Pindar valley in the Indian Central Himalaya
- Nagin (disambiguation)
- Nagini (disambiguation)
