= Nagin =

Nagin may refer to:

- Nāginī, in Hindu mythology, a female Nāga
  - Nagini or Naiṇī Devī, a Nagin worshipped as mother goddess in the Indian Central Himalaya
  - Ichchadhari Naags, shape-shifting Nāgas in Indian folklore

== Entertainment ==
- Nagin (1954 film), a Bollywood film directed by Nandlal Jaswantlal
- Nagin (1976 film), a Bollywood film directed by Rajkumar Kohli
- Nagin (2010 film) (Hisss), a Jennifer Lynch film
- Naaginn (2007 TV series), a 2007–2009 Indian television series
- Naagin (2015 TV series), an Indian supernatural drama television series that debuted in 2015
- Naagin (Pakistani TV series), a 2017–2019 Pakistani drama television series

== Sports ==
- Naagin derby, a term used for the cricket matches between Bangladesh and Sri Lanka

== People with the given name ==
- Nagin Ravand (born 1999), Danish-Afghan football coach

== People with the surname ==
- Daniel Nagin (born 1948), American criminologist
- Ray Nagin (born 1956), mayor of New Orleans

== See also ==
- Nag (disambiguation)
- Naga (disambiguation)
- Nagini (disambiguation)
- Nagina (disambiguation)
