= Naga =

Naga or NAGA may refer to:

== Mythology ==
- Nāga, a serpentine deity or race in Hindu, Buddhist and Jain traditions
- Naga Kingdom, in the epic Mahabharata

== Clans and ethnic groups ==
- Naga people, an ethnic group of northeast India and northwest Burma
- Nagas of Padmavati, a royal dynasty of the 3–4 centuries AD
- Naga Rajputs, a group of Rajput clans
- Naga people (Lanka), an ancient tribe of Sri Lanka
- Naga Sadhus, Hindu ascetics of the Himalayas

== Hot peppers ==
- Naga Morich
- Bhut jolokia
- Naga Viper pepper

== Organizations ==
- NAGA Group, a German company
- Naga Regiment, an infantry regiment of the Indian Army
- North American Guqin Association
- National African American Gun Association
- Native American Guardians Association

== People ==
- Prince Naga (c. 8th century), Japanese prince
- Tarek Naga (born 1953), Egyptian architect
- Nagarjuna (actor) (born 1959), Indian film actor
- Kal Naga (born 1966), Egyptian actor, director and producer
- Naga Munchetty (born 1975), English journalist and television presenter
- Naga Kiran (born 1983), Indian actor
- Alobo Naga (born 1984), Indian singer and songwriter
- Naga Chaitanya (born 1986), Indian film actor
- Naga (director), Indian television and film director

== Places ==
=== India ===
- Naga Hills, a group of hills on the India-Myanmar border
- Nagaland, a state in eastern India

=== Japan ===
- Naga District, Mie, a former district
- Naga District, Wakayama, a former district
- Naga, Wakayama, a town

=== Philippines ===
- Naga, Camarines Sur, a highly urbanized city
- Naga, Cebu, a component city
- Naga, Zamboanga Sibugay, a municipality
- Naga River, a river

=== Other countries ===
- Kampung Naga, a hamlet in West Java, Indonesia
- Naga Hills District or Hkamti District in Burma
- Naqa (alternative spelling Naga), a ruined city and archaeologic site in Sudan

== Arts and media ==
=== Fictional characters ===
- Naga (Marvel Comics), a supervillain in the Marvel Universe
- Naga the Serpent, a character in the Slayers media franchise
- Naga, a character in the video game and anime series Monster Rancher
- Naga Sadow, a Sith Lord in the Star Wars Expanded Universe
- Naga, the primary antagonist of the first season of the 2007 anime series Bakugan Battle Brawlers
- Naga (The Legend of Korra), a female polar bear-dog in The Legend of Korra
- Naga, a divine dragon goddess in the Fire Emblem franchise
- Naga Ray, a character in the 2017 television series Uchu Sentai Kyuranger

=== Other fictional elements ===
- Naga (Dungeons & Dragons), various snake-like humanoid creatures in Dungeons & Dragons
- Naga, a race of Rokugan in the Legend of the Five Rings setting
- Naga (Warcraft), an amphibious race in the Warcraft series
- Naga, a battlecruiser-sized ship class in Eve Online
- Naga, a race of cryptids in The Secret Saturdays
- The Naga Empire, an antagonistic faction in the 2015 action-adventure video game Rodea the Sky Soldier

=== Other uses in arts and media ===
- Naaga, a 2003 Indian film
- Naga, a 2018 studio album by B.o.B

== Other uses ==
- Naga languages, spoken in northeastern India and Myanmar
- Naga Bikol, the variant of the Bikol languages spoken in Naga, Camarines Sur, Philippines
- Naga fireball, a phenomenon seen along the Mekong River
- Razer Naga, a series of gaming mice by Razer
- NAGA (gene), which encodes the enzyme alpha-N-acetylgalactosaminidase
- Gamma Hydrae, a binary star system with the primary having the modern name Naga

== See also ==
- Naga City (disambiguation)
- Nagi (disambiguation)
- Nagar (disambiguation)
- Nagas (disambiguation)
- Naagam (disambiguation)
- Nagamma (disambiguation)
- Nagin (disambiguation)
- Nagini (disambiguation)
- Nagaraja (disambiguation)
- Nagarjuna (disambiguation)
- Chothe Naga (disambiguation)
- Liangmai Naga (disambiguation)
- Monsang Naga (disambiguation)
- Thangal Naga (disambiguation)
