= Nagi =

Nagi may refer to:

== Places ==
- Nagi, Okayama, a town in Japan
- Nagi Station, a railway station
- Nagi, Nepal (disambiguation), several places
- Nagi, an island in the Torres Strait island group more commonly (but incorrectly) spelled Naghir

== People ==
- Nagi Hanatani, Japanese tennis player.
- Nagi Maehashi, Australian cook and author
- Nagi Matsumoto (松本 凪生; born 2001), Japanese footballer
- Nagi Noda, a J-pop artist
- Nagi Yanagi, a J-pop artist
- B. Nagi Reddy, an Indian film producer

== Fictional characters ==
- Souichirō Nagi, from Tenjho Tenge
- Nagi (Bloody Roar), from Bloody Roar
- Nagi (Tenchi Universe), from Tenchi Universe
- Nagi Hisakawa, from The Idolmaster Cinderella Girls
- Nagi Homura, from My-HiME and My-Otome
- Nagi Kirima, from Boogiepop series
- Nagi Naoe, from Weiß Kreuz
- Nagi Saijyo, a character in Ultraman Nexus
- Nagi Sanzen'in, from Hayate the Combat Butler
- Nagi Seishiro, football player from Blue Lock
- Nagi Springfield, from Negima!: Magister Negi Magi
- Nagi, from Kannagi: Crazy Shrine Maidens
- Izanagi (Nagi), from Ōkami
- Nagi, Chrome Dokuro's original name from Katekyo Hitman Reborn!
- Nagi Matsuno, from Shuriken Sentai Ninninger
- Rokuya Nagi, from IDOLiSH7
- Mikado Nagi, member of HE★VENS, from Uta no Prince-sama
- Seishirō Nagi, from Blue Lock
- Kotaki Nagi, from Hatsune Miku: Colorful Stage!
- Itsuomi Nagi, from A Sign of Affection

== Other ==
- Nāgī (or Nāginī), female serpent deities in Hinduism and Buddhism
- Shiva, major Hindu deity, sometimes known as Nagi (lit. 'holder of snakes', cf. Vasuki)

== See also ==
- Nag (disambiguation)
- Naga (disambiguation)
