= The Secret of the Nagas =

2011 novel by Amish Tripathi

- Author: Amish Tripathi
- Cover artist: Rashmi Pusalkar
- Language: English
- Series: Shiva trilogy
- Subject: Shiva, Myth, Fantasy
- Genre: Fiction
- Publisher: Westland Press
- Publication date: 12 August 2011
- Publication place: India
- Media type: Print (Paperback)
- Pages: 396
- ISBN: 978-93-8065-879-7
- Preceded by: The Immortals of Meluha
- Followed by: The Oath of the Vayuputras

The Secret of the Nagas is the second book of Amish Tripathi, second book of Amishverse, and also the second book of Shiva Trilogy. The story takes place in the imaginary land of Meluha and narrates how the inhabitants of that land are saved from their wars by a nomad named Shiva. It begins from where its predecessor, The Immortals of Meluha, left off, with Shiva trying to save Sati from the invading Naga. Later Shiva takes his troop of soldiers and travels far east to the land of Branga, where he wishes to find a clue to reach the Naga people. Shiva also learns that Sati's first child is still alive, as well as her twin sister. His journey ultimately leads him to the Naga capital of Panchavati, where he finds a surprise waiting for him.

Tripathi started writing The Secret of the Nagas while the first part of the trilogy was being released. He relied on his knowledge of geography and history to expand the locations visited in the story. The book was released on 12 August 2011, and was published by Westland Press. Before its release, the author confessed that many revelations would be present in the book, including the true nature of many characters. Two theatrical trailers were created for showing in multiplex cinema halls, as Tripathi believed that the film-going audience also reads his books, and that would create publicity.

The Secret of the Nagas was in high demand before its release, with 80,000 copies pre-ordered. The book quickly reached the top of best-seller listings, selling 95,000 copies the first month, before going for a re-print. As of June 2015, over 2.5 million copies of the Shiva Trilogy have been sold at gross retail sales of over ₹60 crore (US$6.2 million). Although the book was commercially successful, The Secret of the Nagas received mixed reviews from critics. While it received praise for its "impressive conception" and story development, it also received criticism for Tripathi's usage of non-literary language.

== Plot synopsis ==
Continuing from The Immortals of Meluha, Shiva, the fabled savior of the land of Meluha, rushes to save his wife Sati from a Naga who escapes, leaving behind coins with strange engravings. After consulting with Sati's father Daksha and Dilipa, the king of Ayodhya, they come to know that the coin belongs to King Chandraketu, the ruler of the land of Branga in Eastern India. Shiva and Sati travel to Kashi, where a community of Brangas inhabit, in order to get more information on the Nagas. They are accompanied by Shiva's general Parvateshwar, associates Nandi and Veerbhadra, Ayurvati the doctor, and Bhagirath and Anandamayi, the prince and princess of Ayodhya. At Kashi, Parvateshwar is mortally injured in a riot at the Branga community. Their leader Divodas gives Parvateshwar a healing herb which works. Shiva learns from Ayurvati that the herb is only available at Panchavati, the capital of the Nagas. Divodas explains that they get the herbs from the Nagas due to a plague infesting Branga. Shiva decides to travel to Branga and Divodas orders special ships to be made for the journey.

Meanwhile, Sati gives birth to Kartik, her son with Shiva. As he leaves for Branga, Sati stays back at Kashi to prevent a lion attack on the local villagers. They are helped by a group of Naga soldiers, led by a man and a woman, who assist them in killing the lions. The Naga woman reveals herself to be Kali, Sati's twin sister and the man as Ganesh, Sati's child from her first marriage believed to have died at birth. Both were denounced by Daksha since born with deformities. Kali had two extra functioning hands while Ganesh's face resembled that of an elephant's. An overwhelmed Sati brings back Kali and Ganesh to Kashi.

At Branga, Shiva meets the recluse bandit Parashuram, who can enlighten him about the Nagas and the medicine. After defeating Parashuram, Shiva learns that he is a Vasudev, the group of scholars who have been guiding him on his journey. Parashuram is also surprised to see Shiva as the fabled Neelkanth; in remorse for his actions, he severs his left hand. He gives the recipe of the medicine to the people of Branga and joins Shiva's entourage. At Kashi, Shiva is introduced to Ganesh and Kali by Sati. Shiva recognizes Ganesh as the Naga who attacked Sati and as the supposed killer of his friend, the scientist Brahaspati. Enraged, he leaves Sati and takes up residence at the Branga locality. One day, while playing with Kartik at a local park, Ganesh saves them from a lion attack. Shiva forgives him and together with Sati, confronts Daksha, who confesses to murdering Sati's first husband and denouncing Kali and Ganesh. Daksha blames Shiva for causing distrust between him and Sati; he is asked to leave for Meluha.

Shiva travels to Panchavati under the guidance of Kali, who is the Naga queen and knows how to reach the capital through the treacherous Dandak Forest. On their journey, the entourage is attacked from the river side by a cache of ships containing the weapons of mass destruction known as Daivi Astra that was once forbidden by Lord Rudra, the legendary supreme ruler of India. After fleeing from the attack and safely reaching Panchavati, Shiva and Sati suspect Daksha to be behind this. Kali takes Shiva to a nearby school in the capital, where he finds Brahaspati, perfectly alive and teaching a class.

== Characters and locations ==
Tripathi believes that "Myths are nothing but jumbled memories of a true past. A past buried under mounds of earth and ignorance." The book has known characters from Hindu texts as well as those born from Tripathi's imagination, however the characters from the Hinduism do not inherit all of their classical traits.

=== Characters ===
- Shiva – The main character in the story. He is a Tibetan immigrant to Meluha and the chief of the Guna tribe. On arriving in Meluha and consuming the Somras (a potion), his throat turns blue making him the Neelkanth of the Meluhan legend, which speaks of the appearance of Neelkanth as a destroyer of evil. The Meluhans end up believing that Shiva would be their saviour.
- Sati – A Meluhan princess, she is the daughter of King Daksha. Shiva falls in love with her but could not marry her initially because of a law that considers her to be a Vikarma, an untouchable; he later marries her going against the law. According to the Meluhans, Vikarmas are people who bear misfortunes in this life due to sins of their past births. Sati is a skilled swords-woman and is very brave since childhood.
- Kartik – Shiva's and Sati's son
- Nandi – A captain in the Meluhan army. A loyal devotee of Shiva, who is often considered for his opinion and suggestions by Shiva.
- Veer Bhadra – A captain of Shiva's army and his close childhood friend. He was later renamed as Veer Bhadra, a title earned by once defeating a tiger singlehandedly.
- Bŗihaspati – The chief Meluhan scientist who becomes Shiva's good friend. Though he does not believe the legend of the Neelkanth, he believes that Shiva is capable of taking Meluha to its new glory.
- Daksha – The King of the Meluhans, he is appreciative of every effort that Shiva does to save his country.
- Veerini/ Prasuti – The Queen of the Meluhans, wife of Emperor Daksha.
- Bhagirath – The prince of Ayodhya, who is the target of an assassination plot.
- Anandamayi – The Princess of Ayodhya and the daughter of Emperor Dilipa. Passionate, mercurial and intelligent, Anandmayi makes for the perfect Chandravanshi.
- Parvateshvar – Head of Meluhan Army and a Suryavanshi, Parvateshvar is critical of Shiva's ways with the Meluhans, and is a dedicated man to Daksha. He eventually becomes an avid follower of Shiva as he realizes that Shiva could actually lead them to victory and finish Lord Ram's Unfinished Task.
- Ayurvati – The Chief of Medicine, Ayurvati is another intelligent and revered woman, who is capable of curing any disease. She is the first one to realize that Shiva is the "Neelkanth", their savior.
- Kali – Sati's twin sister who was separated from her after birth, due to their father denouncing her. Kali was born with two extra functioning appendages, hence she was ostracized from society and declared a Naga.
- Ganesh – Sati's first child who was declared dead by her father, as he was born with physical deformities. Ganesh was raised later by Kali, and they created the formidable Naga army.

=== Races ===
- Suryavanshis – The Suryavanshis are followers of Shri Ram and the Solar Calendar and try to lead a life that is as ideal as possible. The Suryavanshis believe in Satya, Dharma, Maan—truth, duty and honor.
- Chandravanshis – The Chandravanshis are followers of the Lunar Calendar. Traditionally the Chandravanshis and Suryavanshis are enemies.
- Naga – A cursed race of people who have physical deformities. They are extremely skilled warriors.

=== Kingdoms ===
- Meluha – The empire of the Suryavanshis, also known as the land of pure life. Meluha is based in the areas of the modern Indian provinces of Kashmir, Punjab, Himachal Pradesh, Delhi, Haryana, Rajasthan, Gujarat and the whole of Pakistan. It also includes parts of eastern Afghanistan.
- Swadweep – The empire of the Chandravanshis, also known as the island of the individual. Swadweep comprises the modern Indian provinces of Uttarakhand, Uttar Pradesh, Bihar, Jharkhand, West Bengal, Sikkim, Assam, Meghalaya and all of the country of Bangladesh, besides most parts of Nepal and Bhutan.
- Brangaridai (Branga+hriday) – The heart of branga (literal meaning) or land of the Brangas, situated on the eastern part of India. Shiva travels there with his entourage in search of the recipe for a medicine and to know the truth about the Nagas.
- Dandak Forest – Located in the modern Indian province of Maharashtra and parts of Andhra Pradesh, Karnataka, Chhattisgarh, Orissa and Madhya Pradesh, Dandak is a dense and treacherous forest where the Nagas stay, at their capital Panchavati.

Characters and locations adapted as per the books from the series and from the official website.

== Development and release ==
Tripathi had initially decided to write a book on philosophy, but was dissuaded by his family members, so he wrote a book on Shiva, one of the Hindu gods. Tripathi's agent decided to publish the book himself. After its release in February 2010, The Immortals of Meluha went on to become a huge commercial success. It had to be reprinted a number of times to keep up with the demand.

While the first book was being released, Tripathi started work on the second part of the trilogy, then titled The Naga Secret. Tripathi wanted to start the story from exactly where he ended in the first book, with Sati's fate being revealed. He also wanted to expand the geography of the story, allowing the characters to travel far East of India and also far South to the land of the Nagas, an ancient empire that existed more than five thousand years ago and was filled with eternal wars and the legend of a blue-throated god who would save the world. In an interview with Mumbai Mirror in July 2011, he clarified that it was difficult for him to do research about the geographical situations of India in 4000 BC in just one year, so he relied on his own knowledge and that of his relatives. "I was an atheist till eight years ago, but I have always been surrounded by relatives with immense faith, so scriptures are something I have inadvertently grown up with and learned", he added. The mythological and the technical aspects included in the story also came from Tripathi's habit of reading storybooks on history and ancient technology; he was helped by his father, who is a scientist. Tripathi quit his job as a banker while writing the book, dedicating his whole time to the book.

Tripathi revealed in an interview with IBN Live that the story would continue from where it ended in the first book. The Secret of the Nagas was edited by Sharvani Pandit, who also edited the first book. Rashmi Pusalkar designed the book cover, which depicted Shiva holding a snake and looking towards the banks of the city of Kashi. The photo was shot by Chandan Kowli, with Sagar Pusalkar standing in as a model for Shiva. The snake was created in CGI with the make-up being done by Prakash Gor. Two trailers were created for promoting the book, one depicting Sati dancing and one showing Shiva drinking the Somras, thus turning his throat blue. The videos were conceptualized and marketed by Sangram Surve and Shalini Iyer of Think Why Not team, who also undertook the advertising of the book. The trailers are planned to be shown alongside films in multiplexes by the end of September or October 2011. Tripathi believed that this would "work as the audience that visits theaters is the same that reads my books." The book was released on 12 August 2011, at Landmark Bookstores in Mumbai. Actor Vivek Oberoi was present with Tripathi at the launch. The UK publication rights of the Shiva trilogy, including The Secret of the Nagas was purchased by Jo Fletcher Books, with the deal being made by Claire Roberts at Trident Media Group, acting on behalf of the author and the author's Indian agent, Anuj Bahri of Red Ink Literary Agency.

In 2013, a music album called Vayuputras, an original soundtrack based on the Shiva Trilogy books, was released. The album is an extension of The Immortals of Meluha and The Secret of the Nagas with special tracks inspired by important junctures like Shiva's dance and the war speech in the books. Artists like Sonu Nigam, Taufiq Qureshi, Palash Sen, Bickram Ghosh worked on the album. This was the first time ever that an original soundtrack was made for a book series.

== Critical reception ==
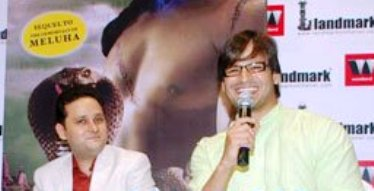
Actor Vivek Oberoi (right) at the release of The Secret of the Nagas, with author Amish Tripathi.

Aadisht Khanna from Mint praised Tripathi's portrayal of Shiva in the book, complimenting the fact that he was able to successfully deliver the humane side of his characters, and their emotions and motivations. He also pointed out that Tripathi's experimentation with Indian Scriptures, has been successful in transforming an otherwise mundane genre, "long overdue in popular literature, especially by an Indian author". However, he was disappointed in the weak dialogue and the grammatical errors scattered throughout the book, especially the inclusion of "glaringly out-of-place world" words, thus having too many anachronism in the book. Rito Paul from Daily News and Analysis shared Khanna's opinion, while saying that the book "is impressive in its conception. But it is executed poorly. "We're thrust into the narrative, mid-action, exactly from where the first book ended. And the breathless pace of the action hardly ever lets up... There are more twists and turns than in a Gordian knot, and at least two revelations of the 'Luke-I-am-your-father' variety... And it really rankles, because there is so much scope for flair, adventure and wonder in the world Tripathi has imagined... The Secrets is not a bad book. The plot holds your attention and the story races along, but the writing veers between the pedestrian and the ridiculous. Tripathi is an excellent story-teller. But he is a poor writer."

Dipayan Pal of Mumbai Boss was disappointed in the book and theorized a number of reasons for it. He felt that the solid plot and the unambiguous storytelling of The Immortals of Meluha was missing in The Secret of the Nagas, whose ending failed to live up the curiosity. Pal particularly criticized Tripathi's language, saying "It seems that while writing The Secret of the Nagas, much of Amish’s attention was upon language. There are obvious and woefully inept attempts at literary flair that make the novel a tiresome read. The book suffers from a rash of exclamation marks and unnecessary italics. Sentences have been sliced to create weak, dangling fragments ('Parashuram charged. Followed by his vicious horde'). Instead of simply talking, people bellow, scream, whisper and fall silent. They are flabbergasted, they pirouette in the middle of a fight, and use words like 'exponentially', 'gargantuan' and 'plethora' in their speech. The net result is text that is labored, trite and awkward." Kishwar Desai from Asian Age felt that in The Secret of the Nagas, the characterization of Shiva lost some of the fervor in it from the first book, and is cast more as a Bollywood hero, comparable to the likes of actor Salman Khan. Desai also noticed that there were too many characters in the book, most of them remaining unexplored. Likening the book with a computer game, the reviewer concluded that "one of the remarkable qualities of [the book] is that it is a very visual tale and less like a literary exercise." Some critics like Sandipan Deb of Outlook though favored the visual style more and felt that Tripathi stayed true to the fantasy genre.

"Well-detailed world with its own geography, history and mythology, and he adds a quirky charm to his tale with dashes of modern science. And the second part is arguably the toughest to write, since it’s at the centre of the arc of the plot, where the trajectory could very easily flatten out. The writer has to keep the momentum of the first part going, while setting up all the pieces for the finale, scattering around a few clues to tantalise the reader enough to stay with the storyteller for the full journey.But Amish does not disappoint. Mysterious hints dropped in Immortals get explained, the scale widens by several orders of magnitude, and the nature of Shiva’s quest becomes more complex, even as its ultimate goal becomes much more fundamental."

== Commercial performance ==
The Secret of the Nagas was in high demand before its release. Of the 100,000 copies printed for it, 80,000 copies had already been pre-ordered, according to Nielsen BookScan. After release it quickly became a best-selling fiction, topping the list published by Hindustan Times. It went on to sell 95,000 copies, with a second print run of 50,000 more being ordered. Khanna attributed this success to the increasing interest in the series. He explained that Tripathi's portrayal of mythology in a different way had been long been popular with comics writers, but few Indian writers have used it yet—and none with the sort of success that Tripathi has achieved. Khanna drew a contrast between the retail price of The Secret of the Nagas and that of contemporary author Chetan Bhagat's novel Revolution 2020, explaining that while Tripathi's book was selling at the original price, Bhagat's novel was sold at a reduced price to attain sales. This view was shared by Deepanjana Paul of The First Post, who believed that "if readers like the writing, they aren't averse to paying more." The book sold over 175,000 copies, making it one of the best-selling fiction novels of 2010 and also of 2011. The Immortals of Meluha and The Secret of the Nagas, have crossed a print run of a million copies. These books have continued to top the bestseller lists of Nielsen BookScan, with the gross retail sales of ₹220 million (US$2.3 million) within two years of publishing. As of June 2015 over 2.5 million copies of the Shiva Trilogy have been sold with gross retail sales of over ₹60 crore (US$6.2 million).

== Adaptations ==
The books have been translated into a number of local languages like English (South Asia), Hindi, Tamil, Marathi, Gujarati, Assamese, English (UK), Telugu and Malayalam, with the author believing that publishing as a whole is gradually being embedded in the Indian business sensibilities. Further explaining his thoughts, Tripathi said "I genuinely believe those five years from today, we will have a situation when other languages will account for higher sales of books than in English. That is the big change happening in publishing—it is taking pride in its own culture than knowing other cultures like in television, where regional language channels have more TRPs." Other than the local versions, the books have also been released in the Amazon Kindle version, available in India and UK.
