= Nagini =

Nagini may refer to:

- Nāginī, a female member of the Naga, a class of semi-divine snakes in Indian religion and mythology
- Nāgnī or Naiṇī Devī, a serpent goddess worshipped in the valley of the Pindar river in the Indian Himalaya
- Nagini (Harry Potter), a snake in the Harry Potter series
- Nagini mazonense, an extinct species of amniote

== See also ==
- Nagin (disambiguation)
- Nagina (disambiguation)
- Naga (disambiguation)
- Ichchadhari Naagin, shape-shifting Nāgās in Indian folklore
- Nagaina, a spider genus of the family Salticidae (jumping spiders)
- Nagaina, a character in Rudyard Kipling's Rikki-Tikki-Tavi
