= The Immortals of Meluha =

2010 novel by Amish Tripathi

- Author: Amish Tripathi
- Cover artist: Rashmi Pusalkar
- Language: English
- Series: Shiva trilogy
- Subject: Shiva, Myth, Fantasy
- Publisher: Westland Press
- Publication date: February 2010
- Publication place: India
- Media type: Print (Paperback)
- Pages: 390
- ISBN: 978-93-80658-74-2
- Followed by: The Secret of the Nagas

The Immortals of Meluha is a fantasy novel by Indian writer Amish Tripathi, his first book and the first in both the Amishverse and of Shiva Trilogy. The story is set in the land of Meluha and starts with the arrival of the Shiva. The Meluhans believe that Shiva is their fabled saviour Neelkanth. Shiva decides to help the Meluhans in their war against the Chandravanshis, who had joined forces with the cursed Nagas; however, during his journey and the fight that ensues, Shiva learns how his choices actually reflect who he aspires to be and how they lead to dire consequences.

Tripathi had initially decided to write a book on the philosophy of evil, but was dissuaded by his family members, so he decided to write a book on Shiva, one of the Hindu Gods. He decided to base his story on a radical idea that all Gods were once human beings; it was their deeds in the human life that made them famous as Gods. After finishing writing The Immortals of Meluha, Tripathi faced rejection from many publication houses. Ultimately when his agent decided to publish the book himself, Tripathi embarked on a promotional campaign. It included posting a live-action video on YouTube, and making the first chapter of the book available as a free digital download, to entice readers.

Ultimately, when the book was published in February 2010, it went on to become a huge commercial success with positive reviews. It had to be reprinted a number of times to keep up with the demand. Tripathi even changed his publisher and hosted a big launch for the book in Delhi. It was critically appreciated by some Indian reviewers, others noted that Tripathi's writing tended to lose focus at some parts of the story. With the launch of the third installment, titled The Oath of the Vayuputras, in February 2013, the Shiva Trilogy has become the fastest selling book series in the history of Indian publishing, with 2.5 million copies in print and over ₹60 crore (US$6.4 million) in sales.

== Plot ==
Meluha is a near perfect empire, created many centuries earlier by Lord Ram, one of the greatest kings that ever lived. However, the once proud empire and its Suryavanshi rulers face severe crisis as its primary river, Saraswati, was slowly drying to extinction. They also face devastating attacks from the Chandravanshis who have joined forces with the Nagas, a cursed race of people with physical deformities. The present Meluhan king, Daksha, sends his emissaries to Tibet, to invite the local tribes to Meluha.

Shiva, chief of the Guna tribe, has been dealing with attacks from a rival tribe for many years. There is no peace to be had and the conflict has led to the death of many. Concluding that moving from Tibet will bring peace to his people and wanting a better future for them, he accepts the proposal sent by Daksha and moves to Meluha with his people. Once reached they are received by Ayurvati, the Chief of Medicine of the Meluhans. The Gunas are impressed with the Meluhan way of life. On their first night of stay the tribe wake up with high fever and sweating. The Meluhan doctors administer medicine.

Ayurvati finds out that Shiva is the only one devoid of these symptoms and that his throat has turned blue. The Meluhans announce Shiva as the Neelkanth, their fabled saviour. Shiva is then taken to Devagiri, the capital city of Meluha, where he meets Daksha. While staying there, Shiva and his comrades, Nandi and Veerbhadra, encounter Princess Sati, the daughter of Daksha. She is a Vikarma, an untouchable person due to sins committed in her previous births. Shiva tries to court her, but she rejects his advances. Ultimately Shiva wins her heart and even though the Vikarma rule prohibits them from doing so, an enraged Shiva vows to dissolve it and marries Sati.

During his stay in Devagiri, Shiva learns of the war with the Chandravanshis and also meets Brahaspati, the Chief Inventor of the Meluhans. Brahaspati invites Shiva and the royal family on an expedition to Mount Mandar, where the legendary drink Somras is manufactured using the waters of the Saraswati. Shiva learns that the potion which made his throat turn blue was actually undiluted Somras, which can be lethal when taken in its pure form. But he was safe, indicating him to be the Neelkanth. Somras has anti-ageing properties making the Meluhans live for many years. Brahaspati and Shiva develop a close friendship and the royal family returns to Devagiri. One morning, the Meluhans wake up to a blast that took place at Mandar, destroying parts of the mountain and killing the scientists living there. There is no sign of Brahaspati, but Shiva finds the insignia of the Nagas, confirming their involvement with the Chandravanshis.

Enraged by this, Shiva declares war on the Chandravanshis at Swadweep, consulting with Devagiri Chief Minister Kanakhala and the Head of Meluhan Army, Parvateshwar. A fierce battle is fought between the Meluhans and the Swadweepans in which the Meluhans prevail. The Chandravanshi king is captured but becomes enraged upon seeing the Neelkanth. The Chandravanshi princess Anandmayi explains that they too had a similar legend that the Neelkanth will come forward to save their land by launching an assault against the "evil" Suryavanshis. Hearing this, Shiva is dumbfounded and utterly distressed. With Sati he visits the famous Ram temple of Ayodhya, the capital of Swadweep. There he has a philosophical discussion with the priest about his karma, fate and his choices in life, which would guide him in future. As Shiva comes out of the temple, he finds Sati being kidnapped by a Naga.

== Characters and locations ==
Tripathi believes "Myths are nothing but jumbled memories of a true past. A past buried under mounds of earth and ignorance." The book has known characters from Hindu texts as well as those born from Tripathi's imagination; however the former do not inherit all of their classical traits.

=== Characters ===
- Shiva – The main character in the story. He is a Tibetan immigrant to Meluha and the chief of the Guna tribe. On arriving in Meluha and consuming the Somras, his throat turns blue making him the Neelkanth of the Meluhan legend, which speaks of the appearance of Neelkanth as a destroyer of evil. The Meluhans end up believing that Shiva would be their saviour against evil.
- Sati – The Meluhan princess, she is the daughter of emperor Daksha. Shiva falls in love with her but cannot marry her because of a law that considers her to be a Vikarma, an untouchable. Vikarmas are people who bear misfortunes in this life due to sins of their past births. She is a skilled swords-woman and has been brave since childhood. During the course of novel she marries Shiva and bears his child.
- The Lord of the People — A powerful Naga with mysterious origins.
- Nandi – A captain in the Meluhan army. A loyal devotee of Shiva, who is often considered for his opinion and suggestions by Shiva.
- Veerbhadra – A captain of Shiva's army and his close childhood friend. He was later renamed as Veer Bhadra, a title earned by once defeating a tiger single-handedly. He seeks Shiva's permission, the leader of Gunas, to marry Krittika.
- Brahaspati – The chief Meluhan scientist who becomes Shiva's good friend. Though he does not believe the legend of the Neelkanth, he believes that Shiva is capable of taking Meluha to its new glory.
- Daksha – The Emperor of the Meluhans, he is appreciative of every effort that Shiva does to save his country.
- Kanakhala – The prime minister of Daksha's royal court' in-charge of administrative, revenue and protocol matters, Kanakhala is an extremely learned and intelligent woman, who gets into verbal conflicts with Parvateshvar regarding Shiva.
- Parvateshvar – Head of Meluhan Army; in-charge of army, navy, special forces, and police. He is a staunch Suryavanshi, Parvateshvar is critical of Shiva's ways with the Meluhans, and is loyal to Daksha. He eventually becomes an avid follower of Shiva as he realizes that Shiva could actually lead them to victory and finish Lord Ram's unfinished task. He is a good follower of Lord Ram.
- Ayurvati – The Chief of Medicine, Ayurvati is an intelligent and revered woman, who is capable of curing any disease. She is the first to realize that Shiva is the "Neelkanth", their savior.

=== Races ===
- Suryavanshis – The Suryavanshis are followers of Shri Ram and the Solar Calendar and try to lead a life that is as ideal as possible. The Suryavanshis believe in Satya, Dharma, Maan—Truth, Duty, and Honor.
- Chandravanshis – The Chandravanshis are followers of the Lunar Calendar. Traditionally the Chandravanshis and Suryavanshis are enemies. They are democratic dynasty who believes in Shringar, Saundarya and Swatantrata- Passion, Beauty and Freedom.
- Nagas – A cursed race of people who have physical deformities. They are extremely skilled warriors.

=== Kingdoms ===
- Meluha – Meluha is based in the areas of the modern Indian provinces of Kashmir, Punjab, Himachal Pradesh, Delhi, Haryana, Rajasthan, Gujarat and the whole of Pakistan. It also includes parts of eastern Afghanistan.
- Swadweep – Swadweep comprises the modern Indian provinces of Uttarakhand, Uttar Pradesh, Bihar, Jharkhand, West Bengal, Sikkim, Assam, Meghalaya and all of the country of Bangladesh, besides most parts of Nepal and Bhutan.

Characters and locations are per the books from the series and from the official website.

== Critical reception ==
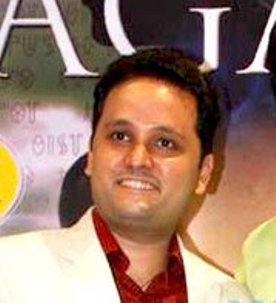
Amish Tripathi's writing style was critically appreciated.

After its publication, The Immortals of Meluha received mostly positive response from critics for its concept but the prose received mixed reviews. Pradip Bhattacharya from The Statesman felt that the "plot skips along at a brisk pace, the characters are well etched and the reader’s attention is not allowed to flag. It will be interesting to see how the trilogy progresses. One cannot but admire the creative drive that impels a finance professional to embark on such an ambitious odyssey on uncharted seas." Another review by Gaurav Vasudev from the same newspaper wrote that "the book is a gripping mythological story written in modern style."

Devdutt Pattanaik from The Tribune commented that "the writer takes us on a sinister journey with the characters, who frequently sound as if they are one of us only." Society magazine complimented Tripathi's writing by saying, "Reading this beautifully written creation is like plunging into the icy and venerable waters of the Manasarovar Lake. One can actually sense the beats of Shiva's dumru and fumes of intoxicating chillum. Simply unputdownable." Nandita Sengupta from The Times of India felt that "while the author spins a tale of adventure, it could have been a slightly snappier, tighter read. Some crunching of thoughts that tended to overlap and repeat would be welcome in the next two books." However, Sengupta was most impressed by the author's crafting of Shiva as a "rough-hewn, hot-headed, a great dancer, smitten by Sati... Shiva's our definition of a hero, ready to fight for a good cause anytime."

Lisa Mahapatra from The New Indian Express was impressed with the story and Tripathi's writing and praised "the interactions between Shiva and Sati, [which were] intriguing. Age-old thoughts and philosophies were delivered in a very modern context, which I thought made for an interesting juxtaposition." Mahapatra added that "the only downside throughout the novel, I was unable to really get into the main characters—they remained mostly on a two-dimensional level." It received a mixed review from Hindustan Times, where the reviewer was critical of Tripathi's usage of common, everyday language. "There are many other subtle depictions of Lord Ram and other characters and overall its very well written. I wrote to Amish to express one small observation, the script writing is not that sharp. You have words like 'Goddamnit', 'bloody hell', 'In the name of God what is this nonsense?' etc, which I guess would be great for an Indian audience but after you just finish a Steven Erikson novel you find it falling a little flat," the reviewer concluded. Sunita Sudhir of Learn Religions also gave a glowing review stating that 'whether the book fires your imagination to dwell on the larger questions of life or not, it certainly is a populist page-turner.'

== Commercial performance ==
The Immortals of Meluha was a commercial success. Just after a week of its publication in February 2010, the book hit the best seller list of several magazines and newspapers, including The Statesman, The Economic Times, The Times of India, Rolling Stone India, among others. The book had to be re-printed for another 5,000 copies thrice within the next week, and by the end of July, it had sold around 45,000 copies across India. Both Tripathi and Bahri decided that a transfer of the rights of the book to a larger publisher was needed, so as to take the book to higher grounds. Many publishers bid for it, but they went with Westland Publishers, who had been the distributing partner for the book. The Westland edition of the book was published on 10 September 2010, in Delhi amidst a media frenzy. It was launched by former UN diplomat Shashi Tharoor, who praised it. The edited version of The Immortals of Meluha was accompanied by the release of an audiobook for the novel. As of January 2013, The Immortals of Meluha, and its sequel, The Secret of the Nagas, have crossed a print run of a million copies. These books have continued to top the bestseller lists of Nielsen BookScan, with the gross retail sales being impressive at ₹22 crore (US$2.4 million) within two years of publishing. As of June 2015 over 2.5 million copies of the Shiva Trilogy have been sold and have also made over ₹60 crore (US$6.4 million) in revenue.

== Translations ==
The books have been translated into a number of languages like English (South Asia), Odia, Hindi, Marathi, Bengali, Gujarati, Assamese, Malayalam, Telugu, Kannada, Bahasa Indonesian, Tamil, English (UK), Estonian, Czech and Spanish, with the author believing that publishing as a whole is gradually being embedded in the Indian business sensibilities. Further explaining his thoughts, Tripathi said "I genuinely believe those five years from today, we will have a situation when other languages will account for higher sales of books than in English. That is the big change happening in publishing—it is taking pride in its own culture than knowing other cultures like in television, where regional language channels have more TRPs." The local language versions were also commercial successes. The Telugu version was translated by Rama Sundari and published by BCS Publishers and Distributors; the book sold more than 5,000 copies in a month and went for a second print order of 10,000 copies. Other than the local versions, the books have also been released as an Amazon Kindle version, available only in India.

== Adaptations ==
In January 2012, Karan Johar's Dharma Productions bought the film rights of The Immortals of Meluha. Johar said that he was "blown away with the world of Meluha and rivetted by Amish's creation of it." The director was confirmed to be looking into the finer details of the production, along with the screenplay. Though initially rumored that Karan Malhotra's Shuddhi was to be the film adaptation of the book, it was a different film. In September 2013, Johar announced that Malhotra would be directing The Immortals of Meluha, but only after the release of Shuddhi. Tripathi also revealed during Jaipur Literature Festival that an unnamed Hollywood producer bought the rights for an American version of the film. This led to speculation in the media whether Johar would indeed helm the film or the release would be an American production. In January 2015, Tripathi confirmed that the film adaptation was on-going and would have the biggest budget of any film series. Malhotra started adapting the story into a film script, with Tripathi acting as creative consultant and reviewer.

In May 2017, the author revealed that Dharma Productions had dropped the film rights due to the contract expiring. Although media reported that Johar canceled the project in fear of any backlash from making a film on an Indian God, Tripathi said that a new contract had been signed with another unnamed film studio. In June 2017, it was reported that Sanjay Leela Bhansali bought the film rights from Dharma Productions.

In March 2022, Shekhar Kapur announced that he, along with Roy Price, would adapt the book into a web series, with Suparn Verma as director and showrunner. The series will be the maiden project of Roy Price's film and television production house, International Art Machine, which will mark the adaptation as its debut production venture in India.
