= Naagam =

Naagam or Nagam may refer to:

- Nagam, Jammu and Kashmir, India, a town and municipality
- Naagam (1985 film), an Indian Tamil-language film directed by Chozha Rajan
- Naagam (1991 film), an Indian Malayalam-language film directed by KS Gopalakrishnan
- Julie Nagam, Canadian scholar, artist and curator
- Nagam Janardhan Reddy (born 1949), Indian politician

== See also ==
- Naga (disambiguation)
