= Liangmai Naga =

Liangmai Naga may refer to:

- Liangmai people, of northeastern India
- Liangmai language, their Sino-Tibetan language

== See also ==
- Naga (disambiguation)
