= Naga City =

Naga City may refer to these places in the Philippines:

- Naga, Camarines Sur
- Naga, Cebu

== See also ==
- Naga (disambiguation)
