= Chothe Naga =

Chothe Naga may refer to:

- Chothe people, of northeastern India
- Chothe language, their Sino-Tibetan language

== See also ==
- Naga (disambiguation)
