= Umayalpuram K. Sivaraman =

Indian musician (born 1935)

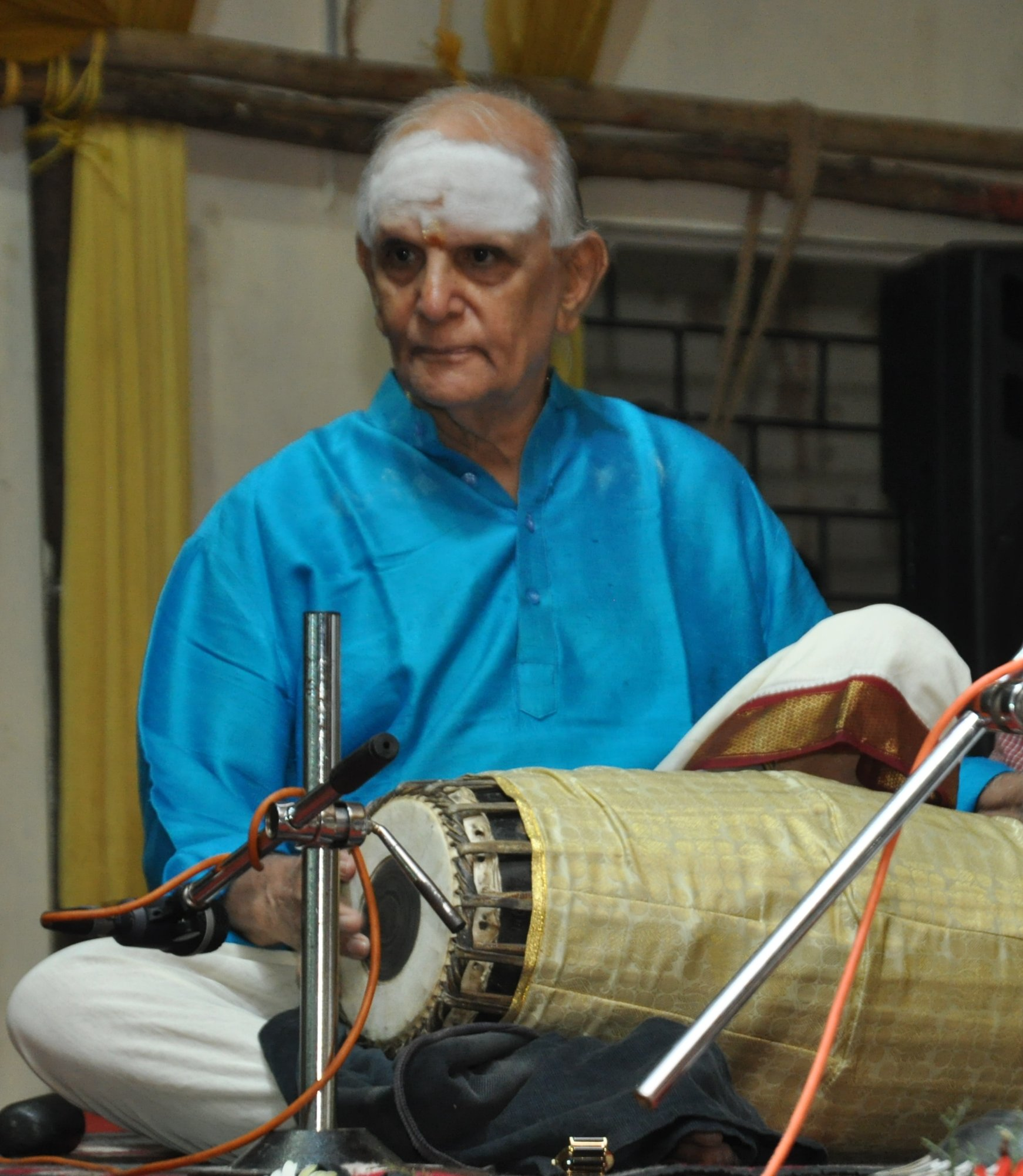

Background information
- Born: 17 December 1935 (age 90); Umayalpuram, Tanjore, Madras Presidency, British India
- Genre: Carnatic music
- Occupations: Musician, songwriter
- Instrument: Mridangam
- Website: https://umayalpuramsivaraman.com

Umayalpuram Kasiviswanatha Sivaraman (born 17 December 1935) is an Indian musician and exponent of the Carnatic percussion instrument, the mridangam. He is a recipient of the Padma Vibhushan as well as the Sangeet Natak Akademi Award.

== Early life ==
Umayalpuram Sivaraman was born to P. Kasiviswanatha Iyer, a doctor, and his wife, Kamalambal. He was one of 5 children and his mother died of smallpox at a young age. He learned the art of the Carnatic mridangam from four gurus over fifteen years: Arupathi Natesa Iyer, Tanjore Vaidyanatha Iyer, Palghat Mani Iyer and Kumbakonam Rangu Iyengar. He also graduated from the University of Madras with a B.A. & B.L.

== Recognitions ==
He was conferred with “Sangeetha Kalanidhi” by Madras Music Academy in 2001. He was conferred the award ‘Padmashri’ by the Government of India in 1988. He received Sangeet Natak Akademi award for mrudangam for the year 1992. He was conferred Kalaimamani, awarded by the Iyal Isai Nataka Mandram of Tamilnadu. He was appointed ‘State Artiste’ of the Government of Tamil Nadu from 1981 for a period of six years. Sri Sankaracharya Swamigal has appointed Sri Sivaraman as ‘Asthana Vidwan’ of Shri Kanchi Sankara Mutt, and bestowed on him the title of Mrudanga Kalanidhi and has appointed him as ‘Asthana Vidwan’ of Shri Sarada Peetam, Sringeri. His titles include Laya Jyothi, Laya Gnana Bhaskara, Sangeetha Kala Sikhamani, Mrudanga Nadamani (bestowed by Shri Sankaracharya of Kanchi Mutt), Mrudanga Chakravarthi, Nada Sudharnava, Tal Vilas, and Laya Gnana Tilaka, etc.

He was awarded Padma Bhushan in the year 2003 by Government of India. He was awarded the Padma Vibhushan, India's second highest civilian honor, on the occasion of the country's 61st Republic Day observance on 26 January 2010. He received honorary doctorates from University of Kerala in 2010 and Gandhigram Rural Institute in 2022.

== Personal life ==
Umayalpuram Sivaraman is married to Abhirami Sivaraman. They live in Mylapore in Chennai. They have two sons - S.Swaminathan and S.Sivakumar.

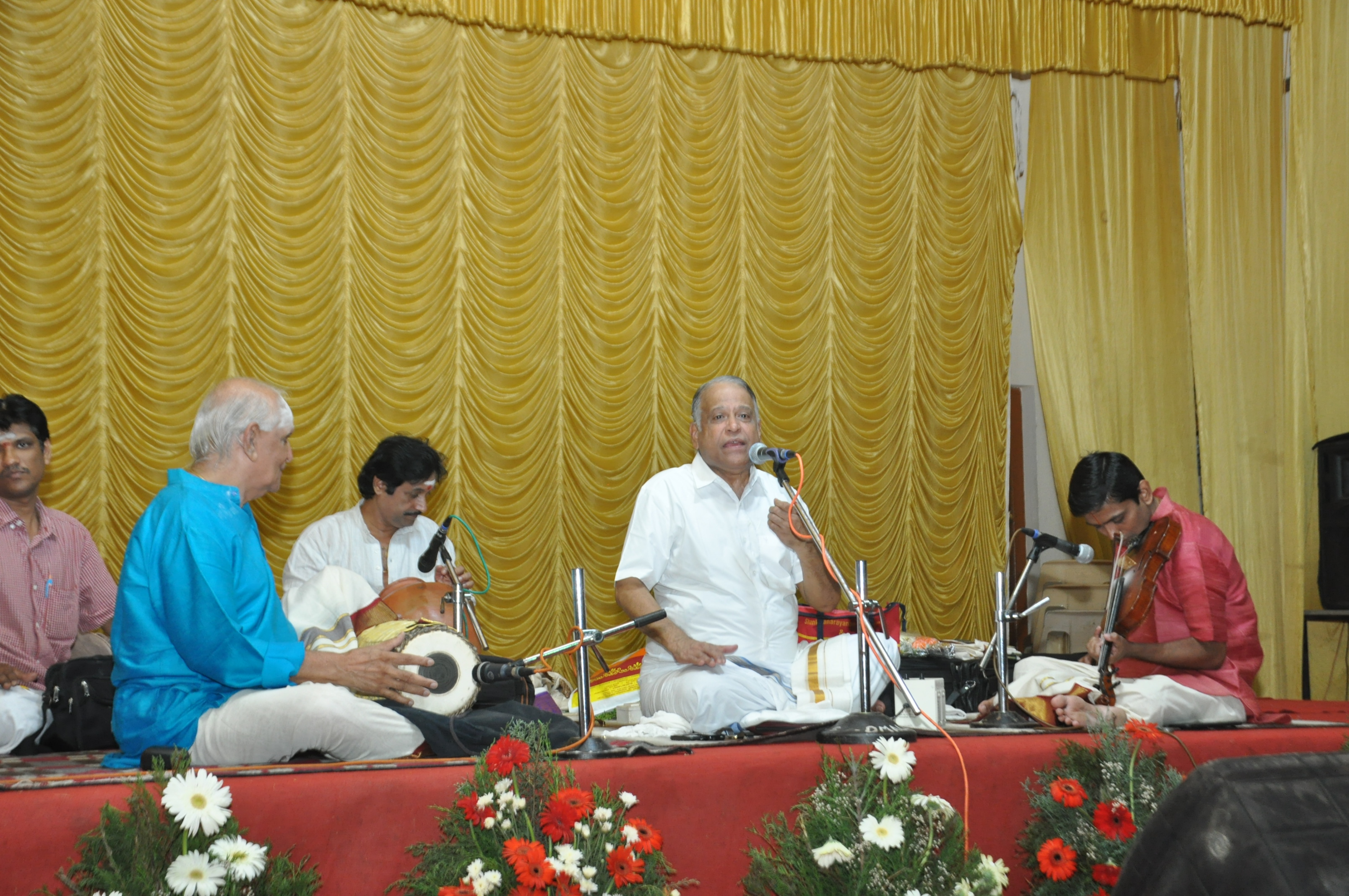
Umayalpuram K. Sivaraman with O. S. Thyagarajan

== Disciples ==
- Erode Nagaraj
- Neyveli Narayanan
- Arjun Kumar
- N C Bhardwaj
- R. Ramkumar
- Madurai Sundar Balasubramaniam
- Amangudi Ramnaryanan
- Trivandrum Hariharan
- Vishvak Kumaran
- Akshay Ram
- Rajna Swaminathan
- P Srinivasa Gopalan
- Umayalpuram Bhairav Chandrashekar (grandson and disciple)

== Awards ==
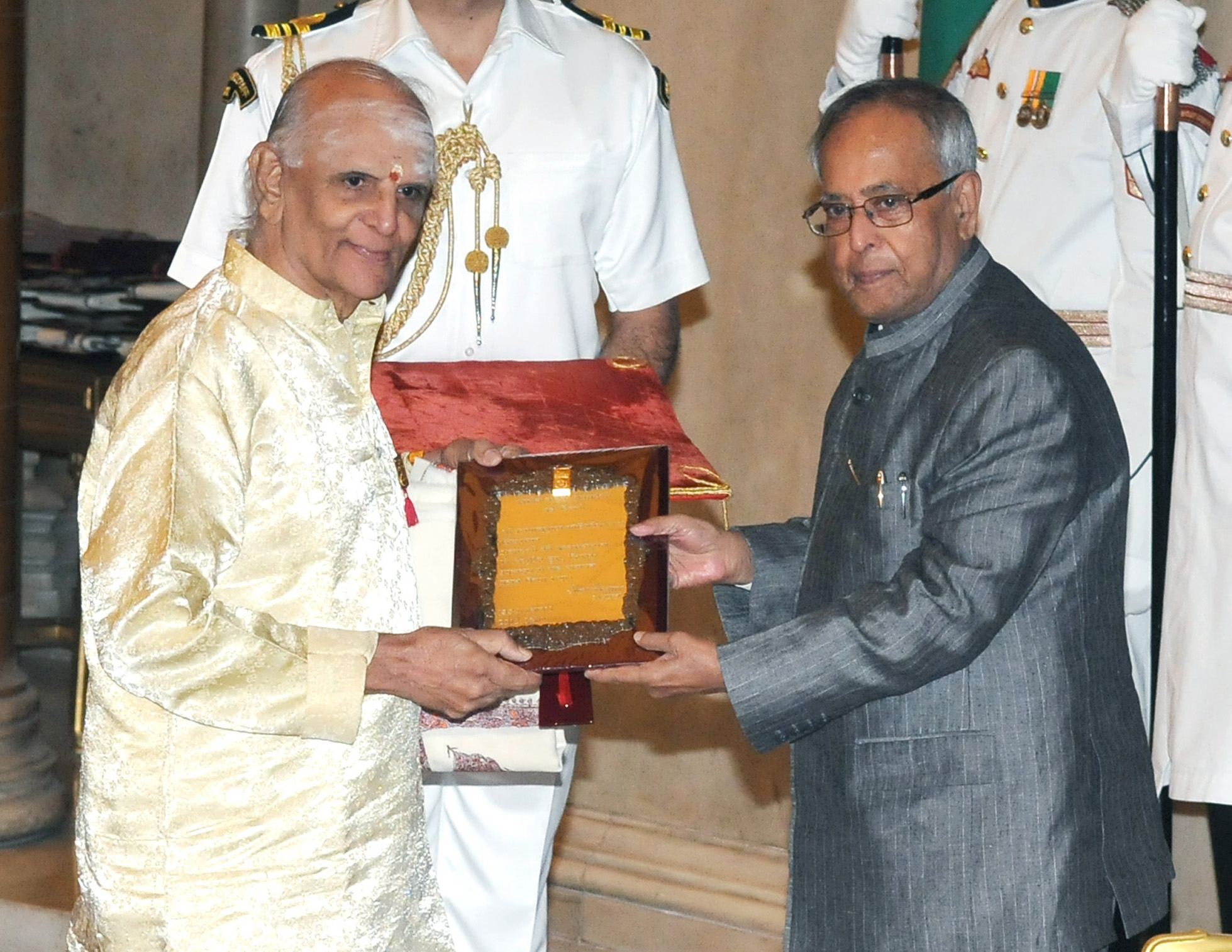
Pranab Mukherjee presenting the Sangeet Natak Akademi Fellowship to Umayalpuram Sivaraman, at the investiture ceremony of the Sangeet Natak Akademi Fellowships and Sangeet Natak Akademi Awards-2011

- Sangeetha Kalasikhamani from The Indian Fine Arts Society in 1984
- Padma Shri from Government of India in 1988
- Kalaimamani from Government of Tamil Nadu in 1977
- Maharajapuram Santhanam Award in 1995
- Sangeet Natak Akademi Award in 1992
- Sangeetha Kalanidhi from Madras Music Academy in 2001
- Padma Bhushan from Government of India in 2003
- Padma Vibhushan from Government of India in 2010
- Sangeet Natak Akademi Fellowship, 2011
- D.Litt from The Tamil Nadu Dr.J Jayalalithaa Music and Fine Arts University in 2019

== Books ==
- Musical Excellence of Mrudangam authored by Umayalpuram Sivaraman, T. Ramaswami and M.D. Naresh
- Music Makers: Living Legends of Indian Classical Music
