= Monsang Naga =

Monsang Naga may refer to:

- Monsang Naga people, the indigenous tribes of North-East India
- Monsang Naga language, an unclassified Sino-Tibetan language of Northeast India

== See also ==
- Naga (disambiguation)
