= Nagraj (disambiguation) =

Nagraj is a superhero appearing in Raj Comics.

Nagraj, Nagaraj, or Nagaraja may also refer to:

- Nagaraj, an Indian given name and surname
- Nagaraja, an Indian mythical figure
- Nagaraja (World of Darkness), creatures in the role-playing game Vampire: The Masquerade
- Nagaraja Temple, Nagercoil, an Indian Hindu temple in Tamil Nadu, India
- Naagraj, a fictional gangster in the 1996 Indian film Army, played by Danny Denzongpa

== See also ==
- Nagara (disambiguation)
- Naga (disambiguation)
- Nagar (disambiguation)
- Nagarajan (disambiguation)
