= Thangal Naga =

Thangal Naga may refer to:

- Thangal people or Khoirao, a Naga people of northeastern India
- Khoirao language or Thangal Naga, their Sino-Tibetan language

== See also ==
- Naga (disambiguation)
