= Nagi, Nepal =

Nagi may refer to:

- Nagi, Bhojpur
- Nagi, Panchthar
