= Gautam Padmanabhan =

Indian publishing executive

- Occupation: Publishing executive
- Parent: K.S. Padmanabhan

Gautam Padmanabhan is an Indian publishing executive. He is the CEO of Westland Books, the fifth-largest English language publisher in India.
