= Nag's Head =

Nag's Head or Nags Head may refer to:

== London ==
- Nag's Head, London, a locality in Holloway
  - Nag's Head Market, a street market
- Nag's Head, Covent Garden, a pub

== Elsewhere in the United Kingdom ==
- Nag's Head Island, an island in the River Thames in Oxfordshire
- Nagshead, a woodland reserve in the Forest of Dean, Gloucestershire
- Nags Head, Wrexham, a pub in North Wales
- Nags Head, York, a pub in North Yorkshire
- Old Nag's Head, Monmouth, a pub in Wales

== Other meanings ==
- Nags Head, North Carolina, US, a town
- Nag's Head Fable, a 16th-century story
