= Nagina Masjid (disambiguation) =

Nagina Masjid, Agra Fort is a mosque in Agra, Uttar Pradesh, India.

Nagina Masjid, or Nagina Mosque, may also refer to:

- Nagina Masjid, Champaner, a mosque in Gujarat, India
- Nagina Masjid, a mosque in Karanja Lad, Maharashtra, India

== See also ==
- Rani Sipri's Mosque, also known as Masjid-e-Nagina, in Ahmedabad, Gujarat, India
