= Nag, Iran =

Nag ناگ
- Village
- Location within Iran
- Coordinates: 26°41′58″N 58°58′27″E
- Country: Iran
- Province: Kerman
- County: Qaleh Ganj
- Bakhsh: Chah Dadkhoda
- Rural District: Rameshk

Population (2006)
  - Total: 248
- Time zone: UTC+3:30 (IRST)
  - Summer (DST): UTC+4:30 (IRDT)

Nag (Persian: ناگ, also Romanized as Nāg) is a village in Rameshk Rural District, Chah Dadkhoda District, Qaleh Ganj County, Kerman Province, Iran. At the 2006 census, its population was 248, in 70 families.
