= Nagarajan =

Nagarajan may refer to

- Anisha Nagarajan, Indian-American Actress
- A. P. Nagarajan, Indian film director in Tamil cinema
- Subrahmaniam Nagarajan, Indian wheat pathologist
- Niranjana Nagarajan, Indian cricketer
- Kuppuswamy Nagarajan, Indian organic chemist
- K. P. Nagarajan, Indian politician
- S. Nagarajan Kuppusamy, Singaporean convicted murderer
- Naga (director), Indian film and television show director

== See also ==
- Nagaraja (disambiguation)
