= NAGA Group =

Geman financial technology company

The NAGA Group AG
- Type: Public
- Traded as: FWB: N4G
- ISIN: DE000A41YCM0
- Industry: Fintech
- Founded: 2015
- Key people: Octavian Patrascu (CEO)
- Website: www.naga.com

The NAGA Group AG is a German fintech company that operates in over 100 countries with 9 local offices. NAGA offers various services for both fiat and cryptocurrencies. The company's headquarters is located in Hamburg, Germany. It was listed on the Frankfurt Stock Exchange in 2017. Octavian Patrascu is the current CEO of NAGA Group.

The NAGA Group AG is the holding company of NAGA Markets Europe Ltd, NAGA Technology GmbH, and NAGA Global Ltd.

== History ==
NAGA was founded in Germany in 2015.

In 2017, NAGA Group AG was listed on the Frankfurt Stock Exchange, and was included in the list of Red Herring 100 2017 Winners. The German magazine Capital.de criticized NAGA's ICO process right after its initial public offering (IPO) in 2017, saying that it was made possibly in a hurry and was quite quick.

Fosun International, a Chinese holding company, is a shareholder of NAGA since 2017.

In 2021, the company launched NAGA Pay, a mobile banking and investing app that combines an IBAN account, a VISA debit card, a share deposit, copy trading, and physical crypto wallets.

NAGA Group AG develops a social investing platform (with 1 million users), crypto platform and a mobile banking and investing app.

In October 2022, NAGA Group AG acquired a licensed company in Seychelles, named Naga Capital Ltd.

In 2024, NAGA Group merged with Key Way Group Ltd., also known as CAPEX Group. The merger has formed one of the world's leading neo-brokers with around 1.5 million users in over 100 countries.

In September 2024, NAGA Group announced that it would be the official sponsor and partner of Borussia Dortmund, a German football club. This would give NAGA Group exclusive rights to BVB Partner's logo. Mike Tyson also became one of NAGA Group's brand ambassadors in late 2024, with Tyson appearing in several advertisements for NAGA.
