= Erode Nagaraj =

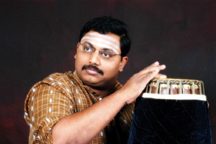

Erode Nagaraj is a professional musician, who plays the mridangam. He learned initially from Palladam V. Ramachandran and has been the disciple of Umayalpuram K. Sivaraman for over 28 years.

He has been a lecturer in the Thanjavur Vaidyanatha Iyer School for Percussion in Madras Music Academy for 18 years. He also conducts online classes for performers and students internationally.

Erode Nagaraj discovered great interest and passion for rhythm in his early childhood and was formally initiated into the art of mrudhangam by Palladam Sri. V. Ramachandran when he was 7 years old. He was a disciple of Sangeetha Kalanidhi Padma Vibhushan Umayalpuram Sri K. Sivaraman and has been under his tutelage since 1990. He learnt to play for many intricate and complex thAlAs as part of his advanced training.

In his schooldays, Erode Nagaraj was a regular at several district and state level competitions and has earned many accolades and distinctions. IN 1993 he made his debut performance in the Chennai music circuit. The Department of Culture awarded him a scholarship for the years 1994–1996. He is an "A" Grade artist and has been performing in All India Radio (AIR) and DD Chennai since 1994. His laya vinyasam (mrudhangam solo) in a rare talam, 'misra thriputa' (rendu kalai) in AIR and in Adhi talam at DD Chennai were lauded by vidwans, rasikas and others in the Carnatic music scene. He has performed in the National Program of Music in the Trinity Festival of AIR and in the Akashvani Sangeeth Sammelan.

He has performed for organisations like the Madras Music Academy, Narada Gana Sabha, Sri Krishna Gana Sabha, the Indian Fine Arts Society and Sri Parthasarathy Swami Sabha since 1994. His lecture demonstrations and interactive sessions have also received remarkable appreciation.

He is proficient in teaching fingering techniques and laya intricacies, and has been training students in India and abroad for over two decades. He has a penchant for all forms of music. He rendered konnakol (verbal rendition of jathis and phrases that are played in mridangam) to the playing of his Guru 'Laya Jyothi' Umayalpuram Sri K. Sivaraman with Steve Coleman (saxophone) and Vijay Iyer (jazz pianist), in the Madras Cricket Club. His mrudangam solo in a rare talam, sankeerna chapu, has been recorded for Samudra, London. G.K.Foundation Trust honoured him in their anniversary function held in 2001, alongside the legendary musician Sangeetha Kalanidhi Palghat Sri K.V. Narayanaswamy, where Padma Sri K.J. Yesudas honoured the artistes.

He has featured in print media like The Hindu, Dinamani, Kalki and Virakesari (Sri Lankan magazine) and in online media like Chennai-Online and Tamil Television Network. He has also performed in DD Podhigai, Sun TV, Raj TV, Raj Digital Plus and in WIN-TV in their special programmes. Besides playing the mrudhangam Erode Nagaraj has been an avid blogger.

In addition to being a full-time professional mrudangam artiste, he lectured at the Thanjavur Vaidhyanatha Iyer School for Percussion of the Madras Music Academy from 1998 to 2016.
