= Razer Naga =

Series of gaming mice

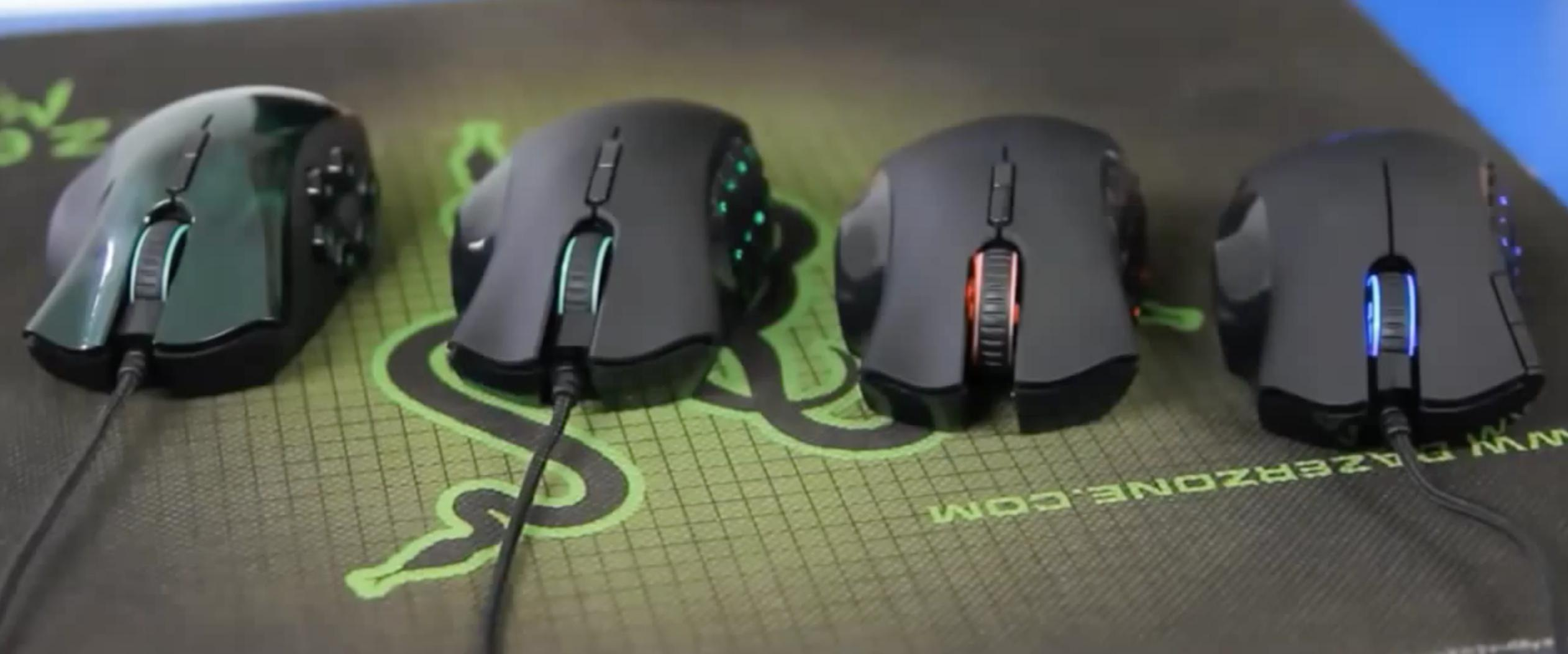
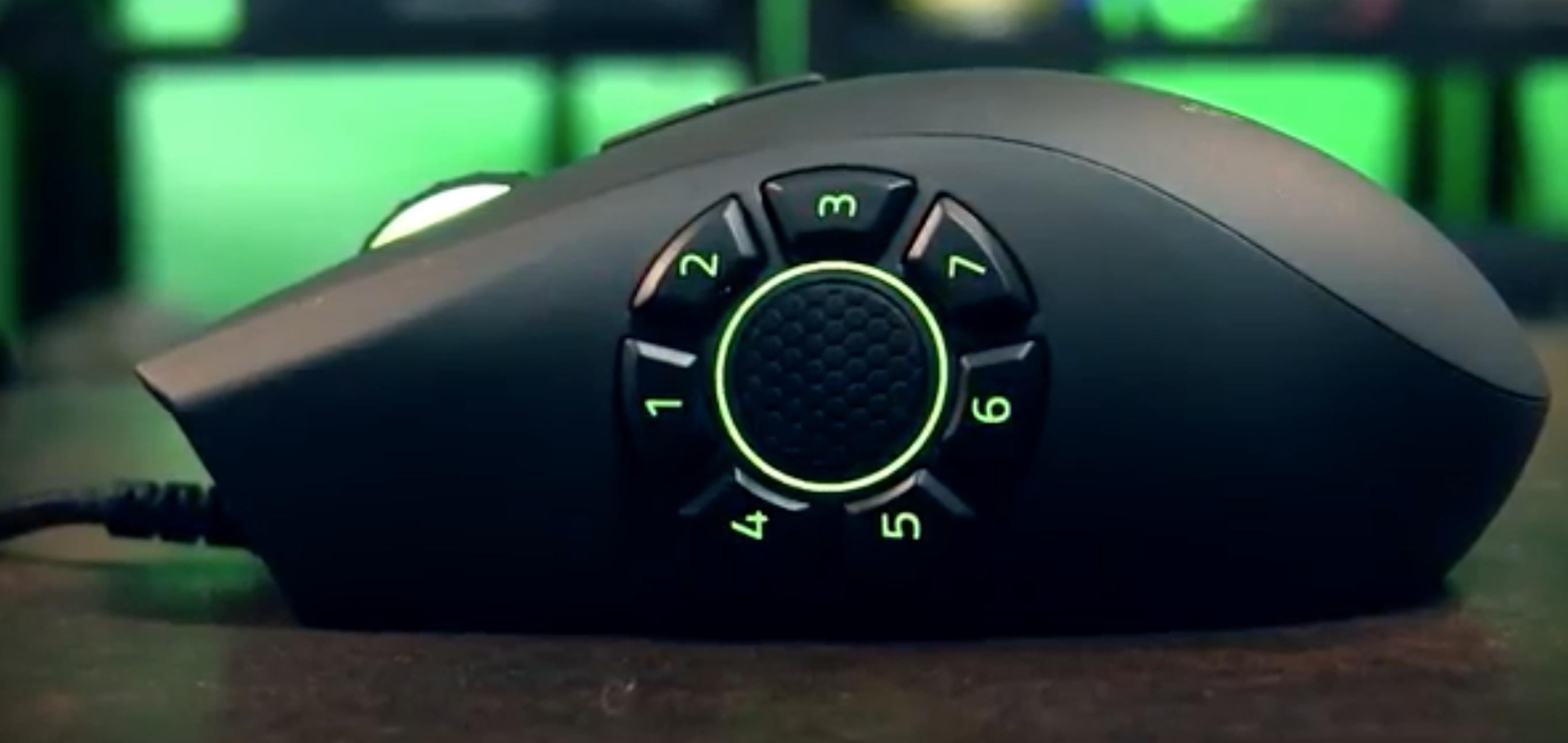
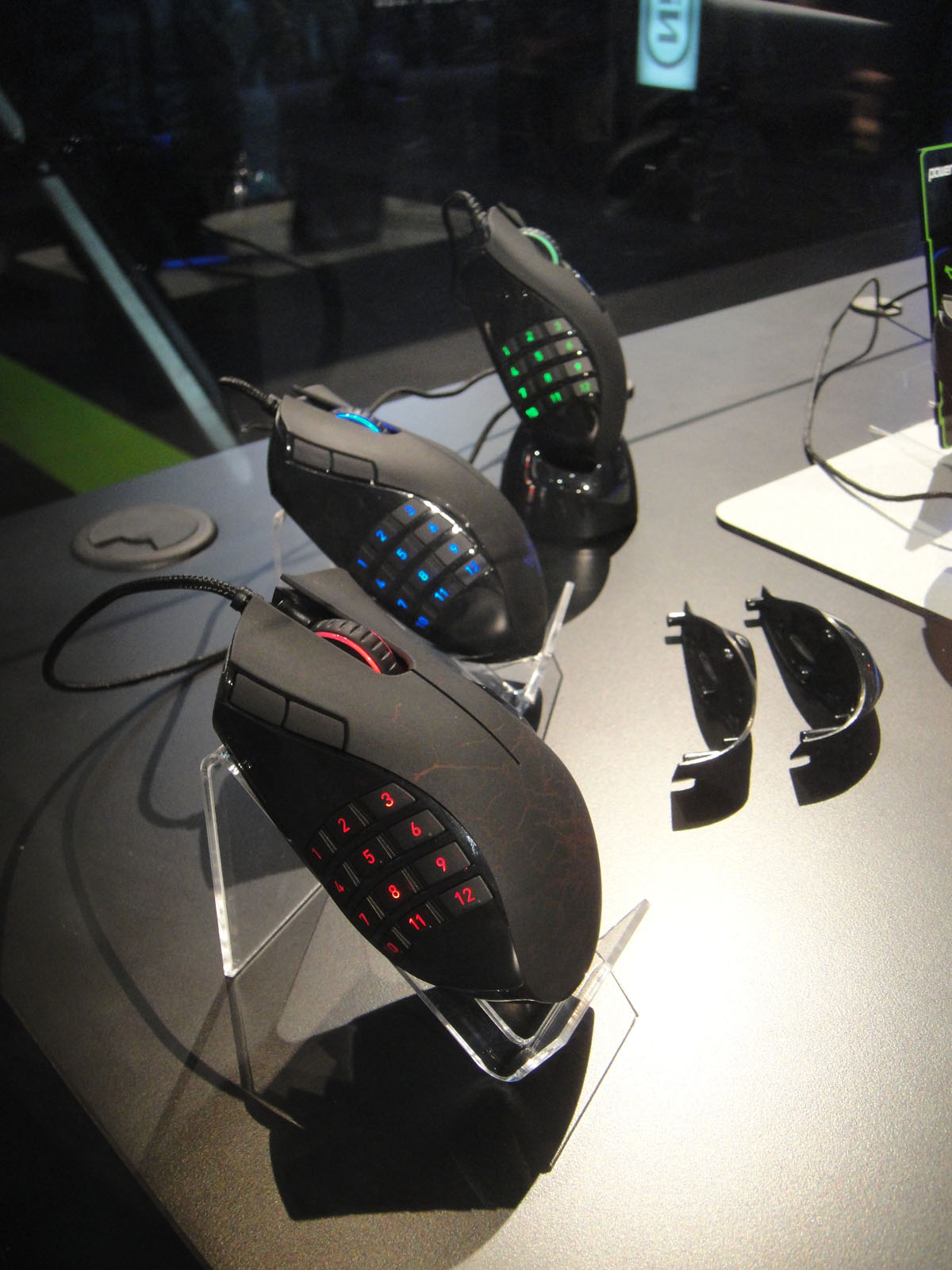
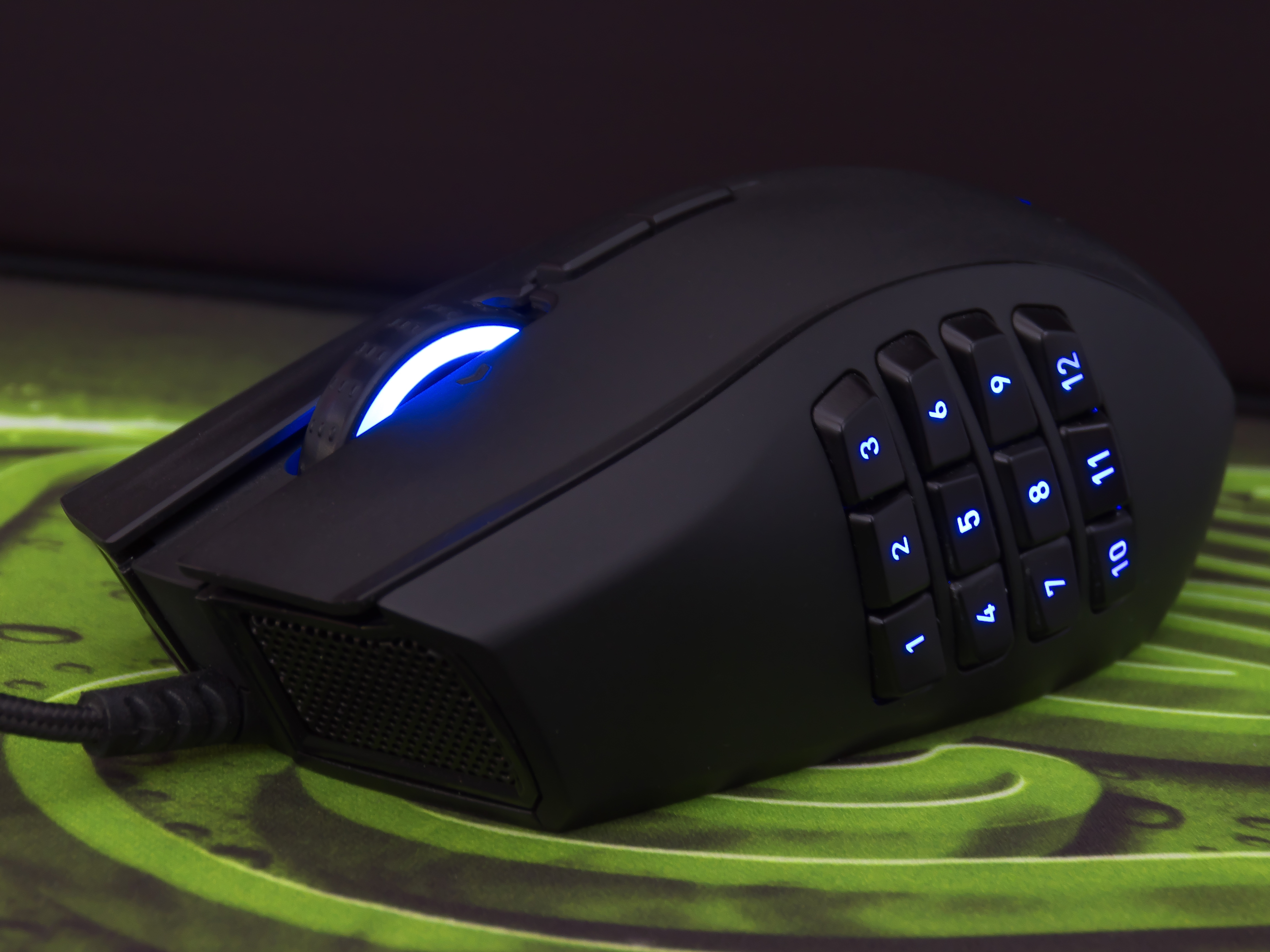
- Top (from left to right): Naga Hex, Naga (2012), Naga Epic, Naga; Middle left (from closest to farthest): Naga Molten, Naga and Naga Epic; Middle right: Naga Chroma; Bottom: Naga Hex v2 side-on
- Manufacturer: Razer Inc.
- Introduced: 2009
- Type: Gaming mouse
- Ports: USB
DPI
Dots per inch	Naga, Naga Epic, Naga Hex; 5,600; Naga 2014, Naga Epic Chroma; 8,200; Naga Chroma, Naga Hex v2, Naga Trinity; 16,000; Naga Pro, Naga Left-Handed Edition; 20,000

The Razer Naga is a series of gaming mice released by Razer Inc. designed specifically for massively multiplayer online (MMO) and multiplayer online battle arena (MOBA) games like Dota 2 and League of Legends. The name is believed by many to be based on the Sanskrit word for "snake", as well as possibly Naga, a World of Warcraft race.

There have been eleven iterations in the Naga series, not counting the redesigned versions, with release dates spanning from 2009 to 2020. The mice are, in order of release: the Naga, Naga Epic, Naga 2012, Naga Hex, Naga 2014, Naga Epic Chroma, Naga Chroma, Naga Hex v2, Naga Trinity, the 2020 release of the Naga Left-Handed Edition, and Naga Pro. All except the Naga Epic, Naga Epic Chroma and Naga Pro are wired and connected through a USB port. The Naga Hex and the Naga Hex v2 are the only iterations to have less than twelve buttons, with six and seven respectively. The Naga Trinity and Naga Pro have an interchangeable amount of side buttons, though both have a maximum of twelve. The colors of the mice vary.

Most of the Nagas, except the Naga Epic, Naga Hex, and Naga Hex v2, which received mixed reviews, were met with positive reviews from critics. The primary reason for the Naga Epic's mixed reviews was because of its price, although reviewers liked its wireless capabilities. The main criticism of both the Naga Hex and Naga Hex v2 was the arrangement of the buttons.

== History ==
The name Razer Naga is believed to be based on both the Sanskrit word for "snake" and possibly Naga, a World of Warcraft race. The first Razer Naga was announced at Gamescom 2009 and released in August 2009. The first version of the Naga had a total of seventeen buttons, with twelve being on the left side of the mouse, and a switch on the underside of the mouse that maps them to the keyboard's top number buttons or its numeric keypad. The original Naga had a maximum sensitivity of 5,600 DPI. Downloadable software by Razer called AddOns allowed the user to map what each key did. The Naga Epic, which was released in November 2010, was the first installment in the Naga series to have Wireless functionality. It was also released with an interchangeable side panel and the ability to change the color of the lights from a pool of sixteen million colors. A redesigned version of the original Naga, called the Naga Molten, was released in early 2011.

In the second quarter of 2012, the Naga 2012 was released. Similarly to the Naga Epic, it came with interchangeable side panels. The Naga 2012 supported Razer's Synapse 2.0 software allowing all the buttons to be programmed and that information to be stored online. The other 2012 installment was the Naga Hex, the first mouse in the series to have only six programmable side-on buttons. Razer noted it was made for multiplayer online battle arenas (MOBAs), such as League of Legends and Diablo 3, instead of massively multiplayer online games (MMOs). In May of the same year, the Wraith Red edition was released. The only difference between the versions was the coloring. In March 2013, after the announcement of a partnership between Razer and Riot Games, a League of Legends style Naga Hex was released, with the only difference being the design and the change from a plastic to a matte surface.

The Naga 2014 was released in July 2013 and featured "more pronounced, redesigned individual buttons, allowing for easier recognition and more precise button presses." It had a total of nineteen programmable buttons, twelve of which are side-on. It was the first iteration in the Naga series to have a maximum sensitivity of 8,200 DPI, and is the only Naga which has both left-handed and right-handed versions, though the left-handed edition was eventually discontinued for insufficient demand. The only other iteration which has a maximum sensitivity of 8,200 DPI is the Naga Epic Chroma, released in November 2014. The Naga Epic Chroma is wireless and also featured nineteen programmable buttons of which twelve are on the side.

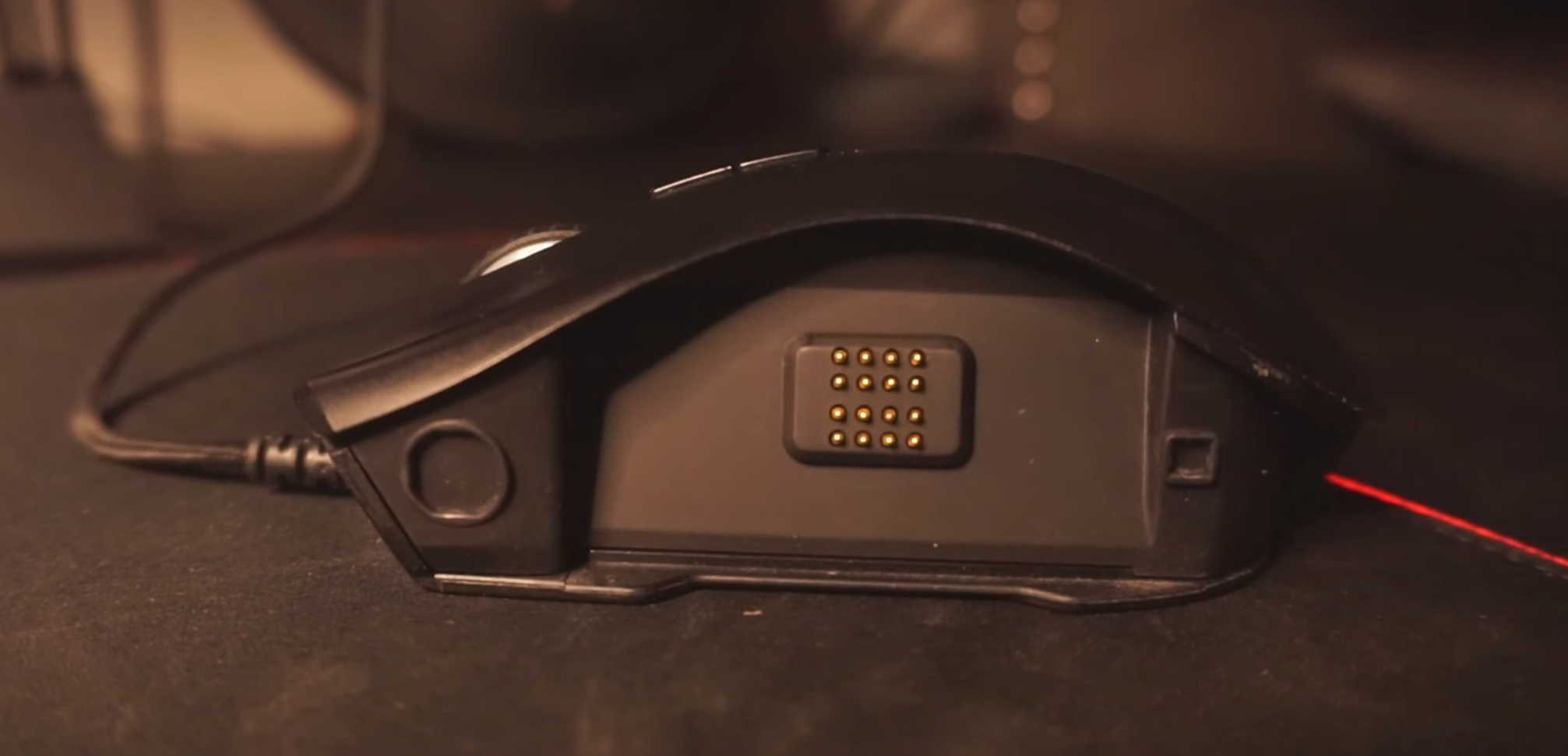
The Naga Trinity without a side panel. This allows the user to choose how many buttons they want.

The first mouse in the Naga series to possess a maximum sensitivity of 16,000 DPI and a "5G optical laser sensor" was the Naga Chroma. Released in November 2015, Razer said it "brings the world's most advanced mouse sensor to the world of MMO gaming" and now "the Razer 5G laser sensor is capable of tracking up to true 16,000 DPI down to 1 DPI increments". Released in June 2016, the first Naga with seven buttons on the side was the Razer Naga Hex v2. The Naga Hex v2 also featured a 5G laser sensor and a maximum sensitivity of 16,000 DPI. All of the mice have a polling rate of 1000 Hz. The polling rate of a mouse is how many often it notifies the computer of its location each second, with each Hz equaling one register. In November 2017, Razer introduced the Naga Trinity. This mouse has interchangeable side panels, meaning the user could choose how many buttons they wanted. With this addition, Razer intended it to replace both the Naga Hex v2 and the Naga Chroma. A left-handed version of the Naga Trinity was planned, but after an unsuccessful Kickstarter campaign, raising only US$80,000 of the desired $1.3 million, the model was cancelled.

In 2019, Razer announced that they would be re-releasing the discontinued left-handed Naga with improved specifications. Similar to the failed left-handed release of the Naga Trinity, Razer asked for those interested to pre-register due to the costly nature of releasing an unpopular product. Released in August 2020, the Naga Left-Handed Edition was the first mouse in the series to have a maximum DPI of 20,000, accomplished through the implementation of the "Razer Focus+ Optical Sensor". In September, the Naga Pro was released, also with a maximum DPI of 20,000. The Naga Pro, like the Naga Trinity, has a replaceable side panel. Naga X, released the following year, did not include modular thumbside panels. Razer updated the Naga lineup in 2022 with the release of the Naga V2 Pro and Naga V2 Hyperspeed.

== Specifications ==
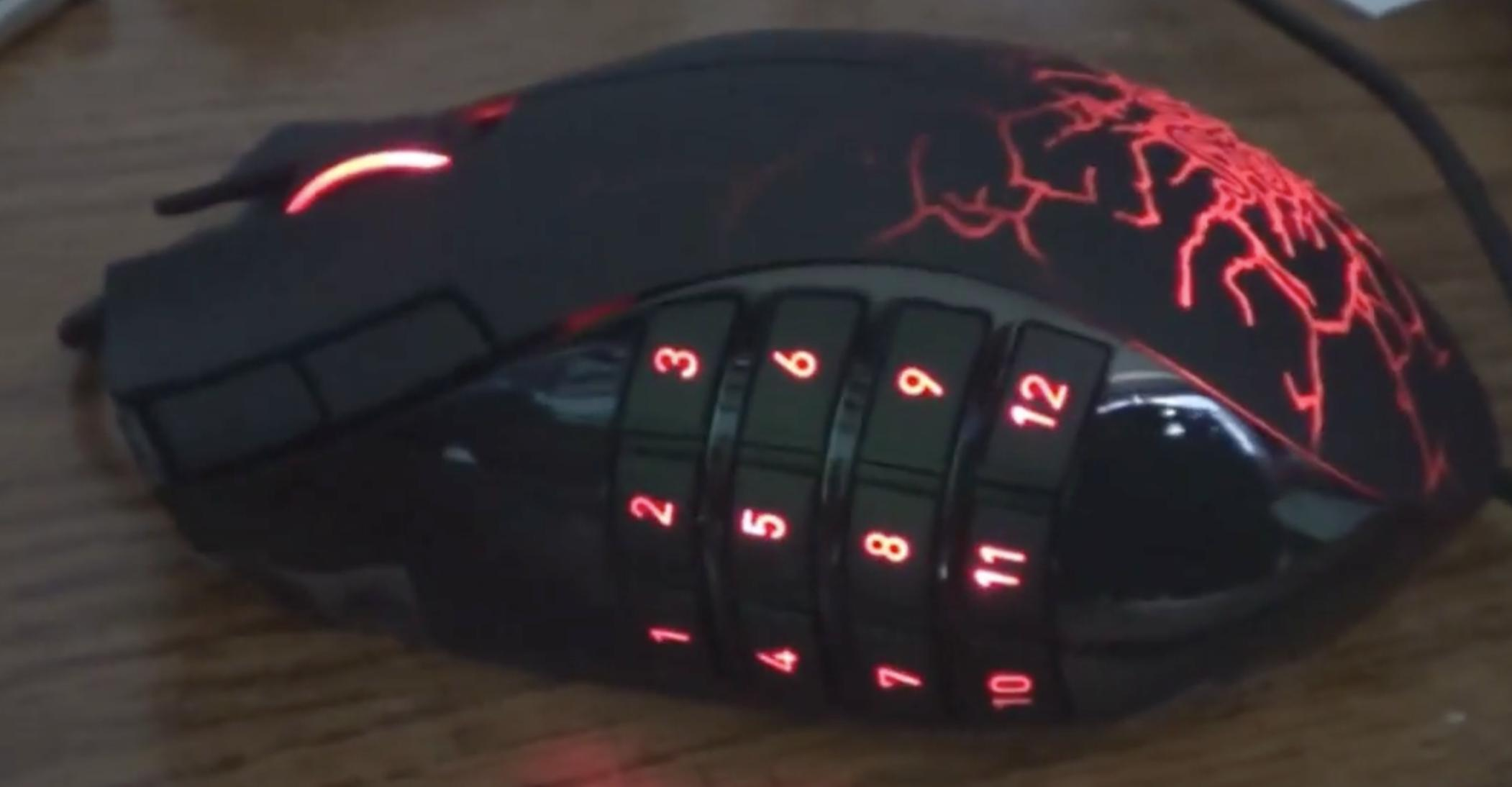
A redesigned version of the original Naga, called the Naga Molten

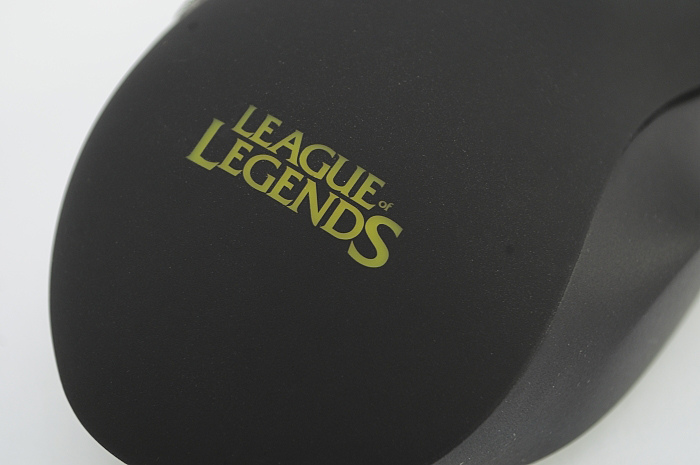
A League of Legends version of the Naga Hex was released to commemorate the partnership between Razer and Riot Games.

Each mouse was released with different specifications. This table does not include redesigned mice, such as the Naga Molten and the League of Legends Naga Hex.

Mouse	Release date	DPI	Connectivity	Laser sensor	Polling rate (Hz)	Side buttons	Left or right handed	LED colors	Ref(s).
Naga	August 2009	5,600	USB	Optical (3.5G)	1000	12	Right-handed	Blue	
Naga Epic	November 2010	5,600	USB or Wireless	Optical (3.5G)	1000	12	Right-handed	Chroma^{[a]}	
Naga 2012	Q2 2012	5,600	USB	Optical (3.5G)	1000	12	Right-handed	Green	
Naga Hex	2012	5,600	USB	Optical (3.5G)	1000	6	Right-handed	Red or green	
Naga 2014	July 2013	8,200	USB	Optical (4G)	1000	12	Both	Green	
Naga Epic Chroma	November 2014	8,200	USB or wireless	Optical (4G)	1000	12	Right-handed	Chroma^{[a]}	
Naga Chroma	November 2015	16,000	USB	Optical (5G)	1000	12	Right-handed	Chroma^{[a]}	
Naga Hex v2	June 2016	16,000	USB	Optical (5G)	1000	7	Right-handed	Chroma^{[a]}	
Naga Trinity	November 2017	16,000	USB	Optical (5G)	1000	Multiple Options (2, 7, 12)	Right-handed	Chroma^{[a]}	
Naga Left-Handed Edition	August 2020	20,000	USB	Razer Focus+ Optical Sensor	1000	12	Left-handed	Chroma^{[a]}	
Naga Pro	September 2020	20,000	USB, Bluetooth or wireless	Razer Focus+ Optical Sensor	1000	Multiple Options (2, 6, 12)	Right-handed	Chroma^{[a]}	
Naga X	January 2021	18,000	USB	Optical (5G)	1000	12	Right-handed	Chroma^{[a]}	
Naga V2 Pro	November 2022	30,000	USB, Bluetooth or wireless	Focus Pro 30K Optical	1000	Multiple Options (2, 6, 12)	Right-handed	Chroma	
Naga V2 Hyperspeed	November 2022	30,000	USB, Bluetooth	Focus Pro 30K Optical	1000	12	Right-handed	Chroma	

== Reception ==
Most of the Nagas received positive critical reviews, with Wes Fenlon of PC Gamer, a video gaming magazine, listing the Naga Hex v2 as one of the best gaming mice, and Marshall Honorof of Tom's Guide website listing the Naga Epic Chroma as 2016's best MMO mouse.

The original Razer Naga had a positive reception, although many pointed out the obvious targeting towards MMO gamers. Nicholas Deleon on the tech site TechCrunch said the Naga is a good and comfortable mouse. He noted that it is not any better than using a keyboard, and how the usefulness of the mouse would depend on how much the user is willing to practice and learn how to use it. Ben Kuchera, of Ars Technica called it a "niche product", stating the buttons were unappealing to people who did not play MMO games. The redesigned version of the Naga, called the Naga Epic Molten, received positive reviews for its design.

Critics had mixed feelings about the Naga Epic, with many believing the price was too high. Rich Brown of CNet said the mouse does not warrant the high price tag and awarded it an overall rating of 7.3/10. The reviewers at PC Magazine thought the Epic was expensive, but commended the mouse's attractiveness and wireless feature. Mathew McCurley of Engadget commended the long-lasting battery and the wireless capability of the mouse and stated that "if you're interested in trying something new, give it a shot." He said that it takes time to get used to the design and feel.

Reviewers thought the Naga 2012 was a good mouse overall. Russell Holly of the technology site Geek.com said he would recommend it to anyone and David Daw of PC World said it would be difficult to find a better gaming mouse for the same price. Daw believed that having seventeen buttons may have been overkill, but continued by saying that "a little bit of overkill is okay."

The Naga Hex received mixed reviews, with the most prevalent dislike being its surface. Sean Buckley of Engadget disliked the Naga Hex because of its plastic surface and how the arrangement of the buttons on the side resulted in them feeling cramped. Brian Westover of PC Magazine said the hexagonal layout of the buttons made them easier to understand and use, but felt the placement of them was sub-par. Westover said that after using the mouse for long periods of time, the surface becomes "slick". The redesigned League of Legends version of the Hex was praised by Westover.

The Naga 2014 received positive reviews, with many reviewers enjoying the comfort and the feel of the buttons. Nate Ralph of PC World said the Naga 2014 has a more comfortable design compared to the previous versions. Hayden Dingman, also of PC World said the nineteen buttons may be over the top for most people, but for those who need it, it's the best option. Matt Smith of Digital Trends said the mouse was comfortable and the buttons felt robust. He noted that the button arrangement may "take some time to get used to". Rob Keyes of GameRant said that when compared to the previous iterations, the Naga 2014 has better buttons and is more user-friendly. He recommended the mouse to people who liked the previous iterations and to people who wish to have better control in MMOs. Marshall Honorof said the mouse is guaranteed to appeal to MMO fans, but isn't very useful for other genres.

Both the Naga Epic Chroma and the Naga Chroma were praised by reviewers. Marshall Honorof liked the quality and design of both mice. Honorof commended the wireless capabilities of the Naga Epic Chroma, along with the lighting and comfort.

As with the Naga Hex, the Naga Hex v2 received mixed reviews, with the major criticism being its button arrangement. Amanda Yeo of the website Gizmodo said that if the reader liked the Naga Hex, the Naga Hex v2 is a definite upgrade. She noted that newer users might be thrown off by the button configuration. Marshall Honorof's biggest criticism of the mouse was that "most people won't need one", though he continued to say that for those who do, it would work exactly as expected. He said that at first, the button arrangement threw him off. Michael Crider of Digital Trends said that once the user gets used to the button layout, the actions are "quick and responsive." Matthew Buzzi of PC Magazine also believed that the user would like it if they play MOBAs, but if not, another mouse might be a better option. He also asserted that the Naga Hex v2 is reliable and well made. Kane Fulton from TechRadar listed the Naga Hex v2 as one of the ten best gaming mice.

Similar to historical Naga mice updates, the Naga X had mixed reviews from critics, mostly since it dropped one of the Naga Pro's defining characteristics, the swappable side plates. Mike Epstein from PCMag noted the dropping of the modular side panels, wireless charging, and tilting scroll wheel as some downsides of the Naga X. However, reviewers at Setup.gg noted that the tradeoffs may be worth it for some gamers, particularly since dropping some of these features helped the Naga X reach the low 85-gram weight, which is light compared to competing MMO and MOBA gaming mice.

== Notes ==
1. Razer devices with Chroma support means the user is able to change the color of the lighting from a pool of 16.8 million colors.
