= Nagas =

Nagas may refer to the following:

- Nair, The rulers of ancient Kerala
- Nāga, serpent deities in Indian mythology
- Naga Kingdom, a legendary kingdom in the ancient Indian epic Mahabharata
- Nagas of Padmavati, a dynasty of ancient India
- Nagas of Vidisha, a dynasty of ancient India
- Nagas of Vindhyatabi, a dynasty of Odisha, India
- Naga people (Sri Lanka), snake worshippers mentioned in ancient Sri Lankan chronicles
- Naga people, the modern Tibeto-Burman tribal people
- Naga Rajputs, a caste of India

== See also ==
- Naga (disambiguation)
