= Panchavati =

City in Maharashtra, India

- Pilgrim City
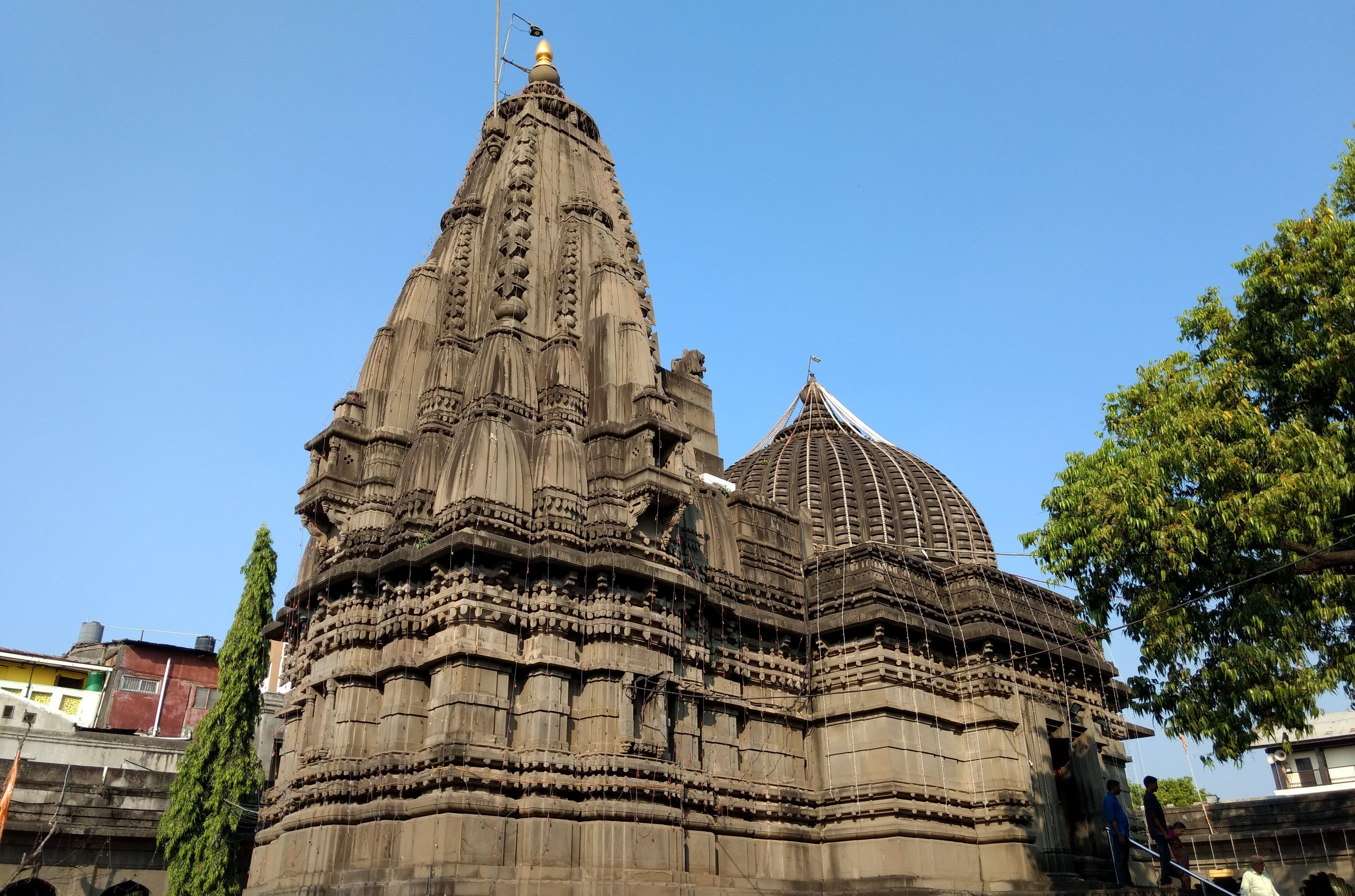
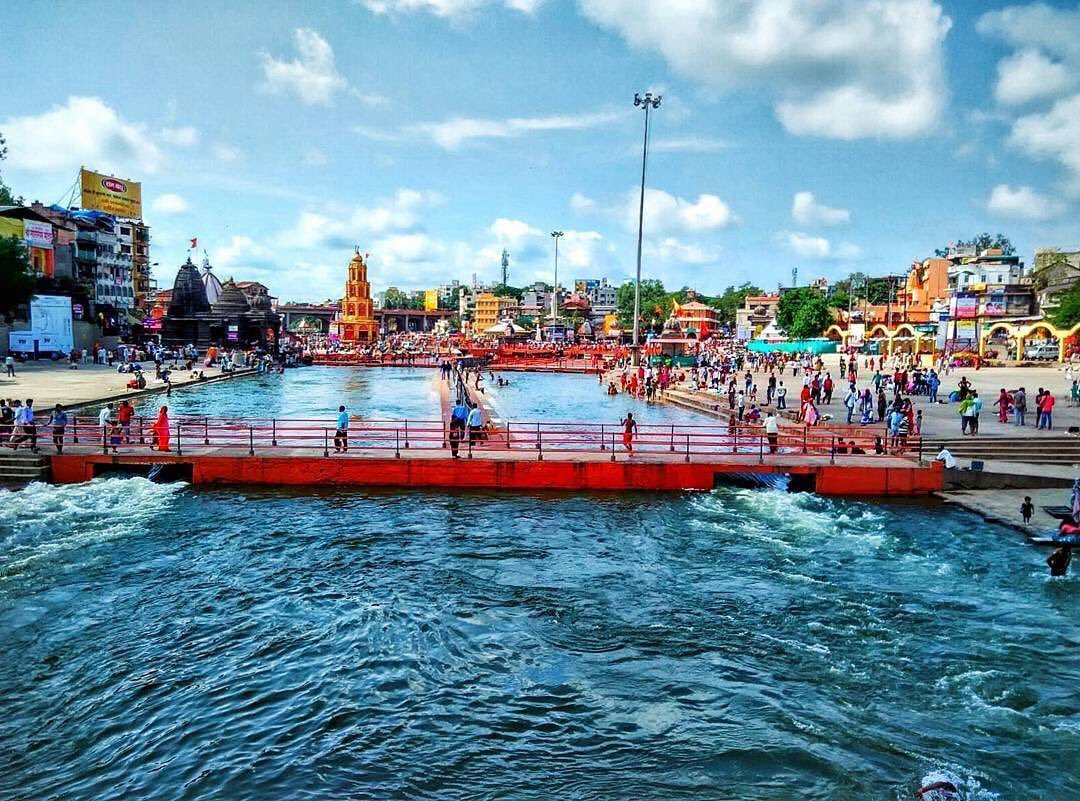
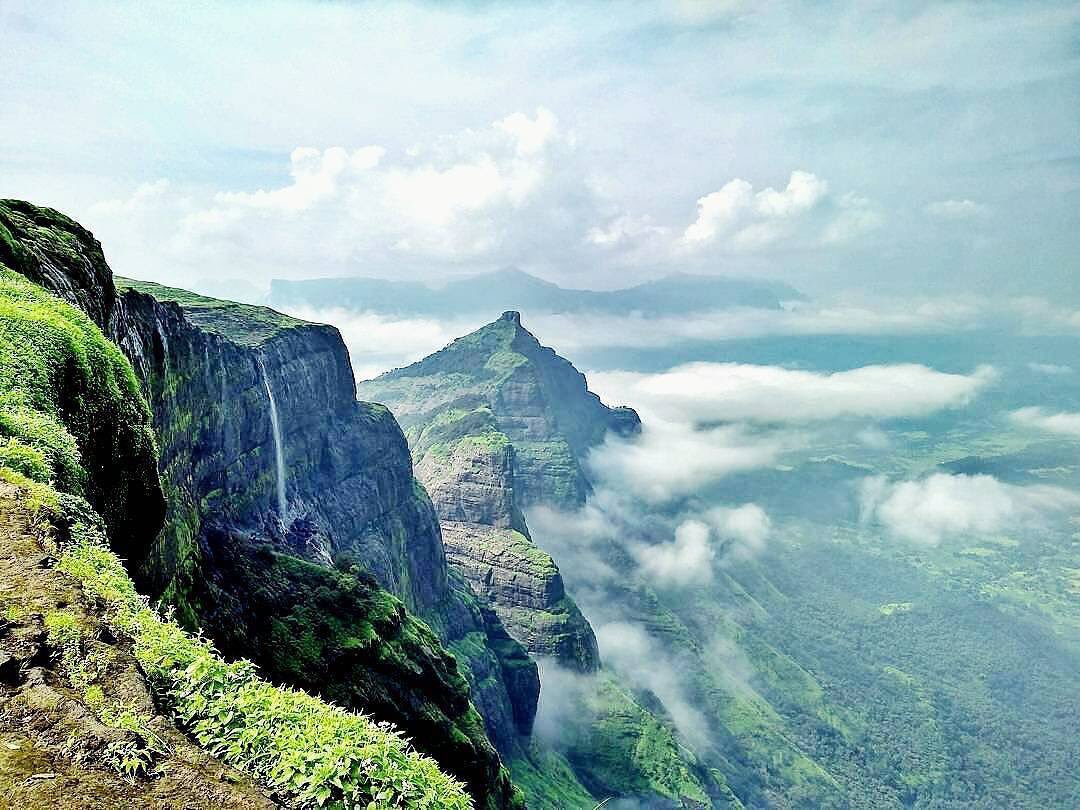
- Kalaram Temple, Godavari Ghat and View of Panchavati mountains
- Interactive map of Panchavati
- Country: India
- State: Maharashtra
- District: Nashik
- Division: Nashik

Panchavati is a sacred pilgrimage city on the left bank of the Godavari River in Nashik, Maharashtra, India, famously known as the place where Lord Rama, Sita, and Lakshmana lived during their 14-year exile.

== Etymology ==
Derived from "Pancha" (five) and "Vati" (banyan tree), referencing a grove of five sacred banyan trees where Lord Rama, Goddess Sita, and Lakshmana lived during their 14-year exile.

== History ==
=== Mythology ===
Panchavati is significant in history, social life, and culture. The city is located on the banks of the Godavari River, making it a sacred site for Hindus around the world. During his 14-year exile from Ayodhya, Rama, the king of Ayodhya, is said to have made Panchavati his home.

According to Hindu tradition, Panchavati is associated with the epic Ramayana: it is the place where Lakshmana severed the nose of the demoness Shurpanakha on the banks of the Godavari River during the 14-year exile of Rama, Sita, and Lakshmana. The area around Panchavati is considered sacred and features several temples and holy sites.

== Major attractions and temples in Panchavati ==
Kalaram Temple: A magnificent and historic temple dedicated to Lord Rama, made of black stone.

Sita Cave: The sacred cave where Sita lived and from where she is believed to have been abducted.

Ramkund: The main bathing ghat on the banks of the Godavari River, where Lord Rama bathed.

Kapaleshwar Mahadev Temple: An ancient temple dedicated to Lord Shiva.

Other temples: Panchmukhi Hanuman, Godavari Temple, Sundarnarayan Temple, and Kapaleshwar Temple, among others.

Tapovan: Located near Panchavati, this is the site where Lakshmana cut off Shurpanakha's nose and also houses a tall temple dedicated to Lord Rama.
