= Naiṇī Devī =

Local Himalayan Hindu Goddess

Naiṇī, Nāgnī or Nāginā Devī is the name of nine Hindu Goddesses belonging to the shape-shifting serpent deities or Nāgas, who rule as goddesses and mothers over the lower part of the Pindar river valley in the Garhwal Himalaya region of Uttarakhand, India. Seven of these goddesses establish the rule over their territory through a journey (yātrā) of six months, during which they are carried around, embodied in the shape of a bamboo pole clothed with saris.

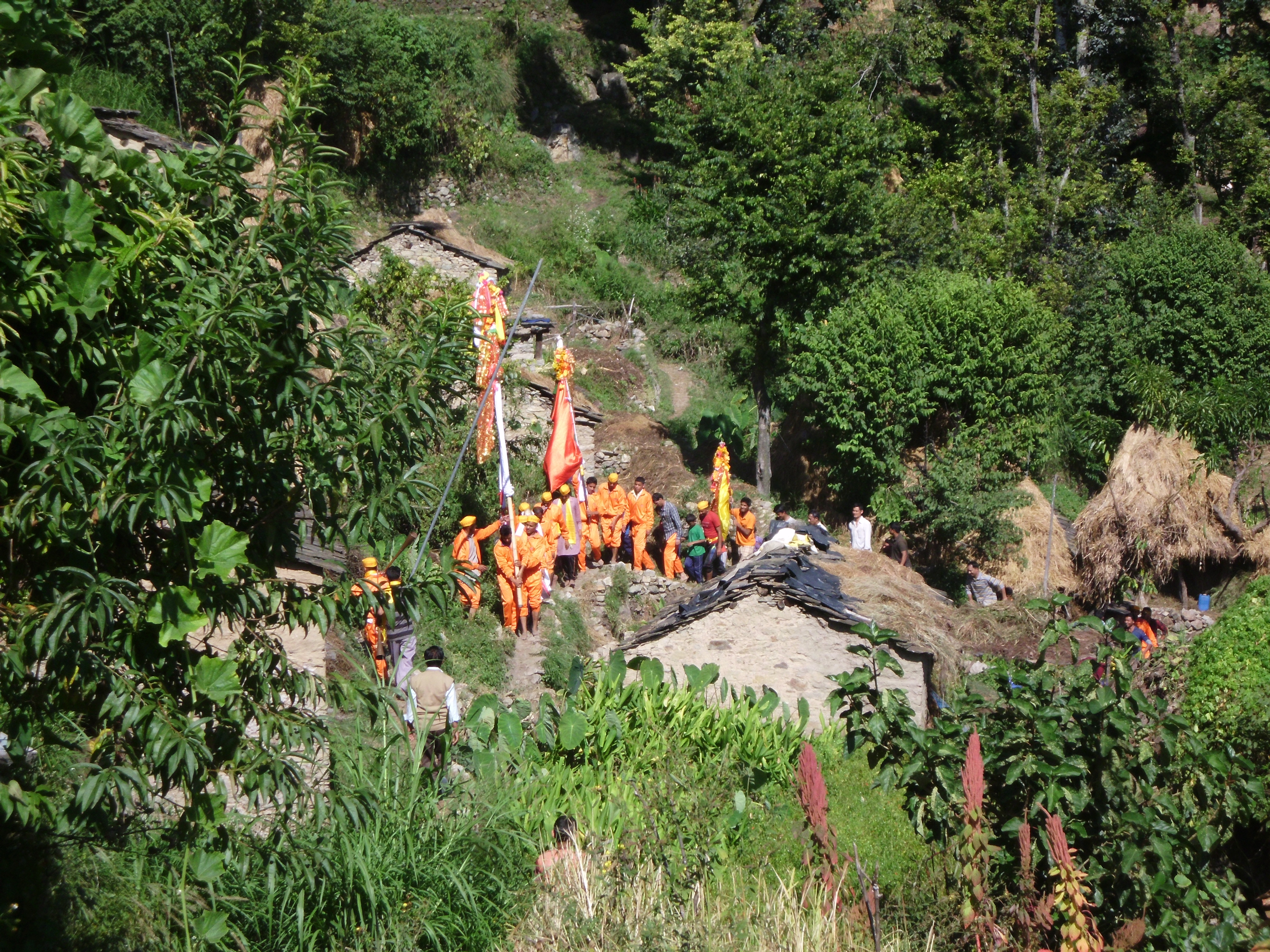
Naiṇī devī of the village Rains, accompanied by Bhumiyāl devtā, the guardian of the land, walks through her territory in her "journey to meet her out-married sisters" (dhyāṇī milan dhyorā yātrā)

Through their yātrās, the Naiṇīs re-establish their family ties to those women of their respective village who have married into other villages. In the Indian Western Himalaya, this is a common way of establishing divine kingship and territory. These journeys take place only two times a century: the Naiṇī of the village Ratura went on her journey from September 2010 to March 2011 after 54 years, the Naiṇī of the village Rains "came out" (Hindi nikaltī huī) in September 2016 after 42 years, and the journey of the Naiṇī of the village Bhattiyana started in September 2023, 38 years after her last journey.

The main goal of the rituals, festivals and processions devoted to the Naiṇīs is to entertain them, to "make them dance and play" (nacānā aur khilānā) in their bamboo bodies, in male dancers in evening performances wearing cobra-shaped diadems, and in possessed mediums. The six months of Naiṇī's journey begin by summoning her from the Netherworld, called Pātāllok or Nāglok, the "world of serpents". This world is identified with or represented by an earthen vessel buried under a Toona tree, which stands in an intimate connection to the goddess. The ritual journeys end with the making of a rope (śirā), which is several kilometers long and consists of babulū grass. This rope is explicitly intended to resemble a snake, whose head “runs” (i.e., is carried) uphill and the tail downhill on the last day of the yātrā. On the day before that final event, a more naturalistic serpent puppet is made for the kaṃṣ phaṭnā ceremony, the enactment of a local story about Kṛṣṇa bringing the longest snake from the Nāglok to this world.

The mythological stories about the Naiṇīs name various Nāga kings as their father, alternatively Vāsuki or Kāliya, which are main characters of the classical Sanskrit epics, especially the first book of the Mahābhārata and the Harivaṃśa. While there is a huge variety of stories about the Naiṇīs within their villages, most agree that they were brought onto the "world of mortals" (Mṛtyulok) by the seven primordial sages (mahārśi) to participate in a sacrificial ritual (yagya). In this ritual, nine virgin girls (kuṃvārī) were needed to personify the nine aspects of goddess Durgā, as it is done during the Navarātrī festival. One of the mahārśis, Bāṅkuṛā Ṛṣi, who knew the language of the Nāgas, had to go to the Nāglok and bring a group of nine girls in the age of nine years to the surface of earth. Finally, he was able to convince their parents to let them come with him – on the condition that they would not be offered earthly food, because that would pollute them and prevent them from coming back to Nāglok. However, they could not resist tasting a sweet rice pudding (khīr) they were offered. Thus, they were bound to this world, the World of Mortals. However, the nine girls liked it here on Earth, they frolicked and played around on the large flat hillside called Kob, and enjoyed the beautiful scenery. There, however, a shepherd named Hansa Bugalya saw them and planned to catch them to marry them to his nine grandsons. He threw a blanket over them, but they escaped into all directions. One of them fell down a cliff and another one sunk in a swamp - these were the two sisters who do not go on journeys, because they either died or reentered their subterranean realm, the Nāglok. The others found refuge in villages, where they were treated with respect and established friendship with the villagers by letting springs of water emerge from the ground.

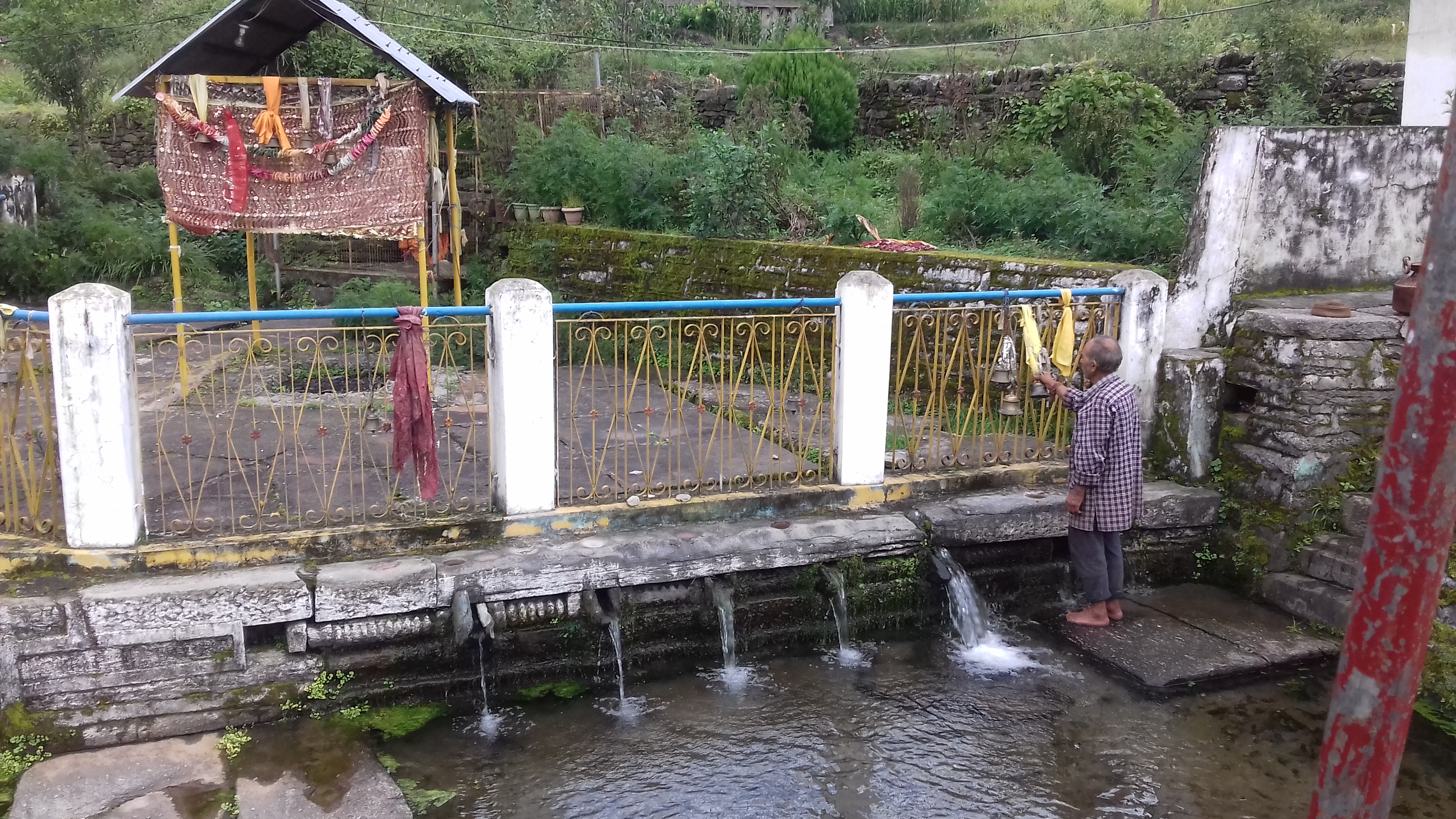
The Naiṇī of the village Sankot is believed to dwell in nine springs in her village, which supply water for the local agriculture (Photo by Gerrit Lange, September 2018)

The Naiṇīs share one main aspect with other Nāgas of Uttarakhand: they are intimately related to springs and irrigation channels (dhārā), crucial for the water supply to the rice fields. In the Himalaya the Nāglok is identified as the place where the subterranean water comes from, whereas, in other parts of India, termite heaps are considered to be their portal to Earth's surface. In Garhwal, there is barely a spring or mountain lake without a Nāg temple. Especially well-known is the temple of Kṛṣṇa Nagarjā, the serpent king, in Sem Mukhem. Also mount Nāg Tibbā, various lakes and villages in the upper Bhagirathi valley, the Berinag area of Kumaun, and many springs and lakes in Himachal Pradesh and Kashmir are places of their worship.

The journeys of the Naiṇīs and the complex rituals involved are similar to other deities of Garhwal, which are not explicitly marked as Nāgas. However, many of the local Cāṇḍikā, Jākh or Ghaṇḍiyāl deities are also said to be children of Nāg princesses such as Ulūpī, Ucchī or Vasudanta.
