= Shivshankar Menon =

Indian diplomat and former National Security Advisor of India (born 1949)

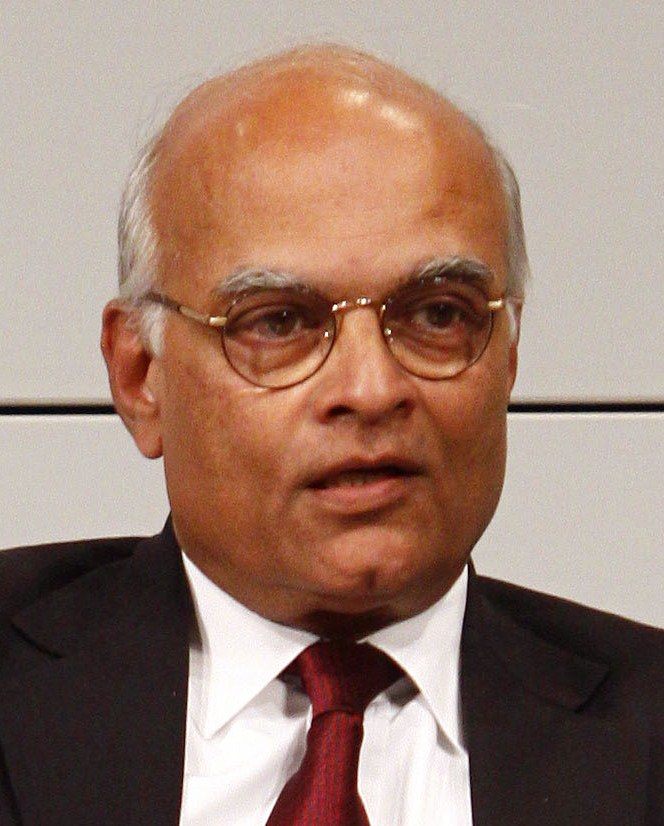

4th National Security Advisor of India
- In office 24 January 2010 – 26 May 2014
- Prime Minister: Manmohan Singh
- Preceded by: M K Narayanan
- Succeeded by: Ajit Kumar Doval

27th Foreign Secretary of India
- In office 1 October 2006 – 31 July 2009
- Preceded by: Shyam Saran
- Succeeded by: Nirupama Rao

Ambassador of India to China
- In office 3 August 2000 – 7 July 2003
- Preceded by: Vijay K. Nambiar
- Succeeded by: Nalin Surie

High Commissioner of India to Sri Lanka
- In office 1997-2000
- Succeeded by: Gopalkrishna Gandhi

Personal details
- Born: 5 July 1949 (age 77) Ottapalam, Malabar District, Madras Presidency (present-day Kerala, India)
- Relatives: K. P. S. Menon (grandfather); C. Sankaran Nair (great-grandfather)
- Education: Delhi University
- Occupation: Diplomat, civil servant

Shivshankar Menon (born 5 July 1949) is a retired Indian diplomat and statesman of Indian Foreign Service who served as the 4th National Security Advisor of India to the Prime Minister Manmohan Singh. He had previously served as the Foreign Secretary in the Ministry of External Affairs. Prior to that he was Indian High Commissioner to Pakistan, and Sri Lanka and ambassador to China and Israel. He is Distinguished Fellow at the Centre for Social and Economic Progress. He is also a Visiting Professor of International Relations at Ashoka University.

== Early life and education ==
Shivshankar Menon hails from Ottapalam in the Palakkad district of Kerala. He comes from a family of diplomats; his father, Parappil Narayana Menon, served as the ambassador to Yugoslavia in his last days.

Menon's grandfather, K. P. S. Menon (senior), was India's first Foreign Secretary, while his uncle, K. P. S. Menon Jr., was the former Indian ambassador to China and the 15th Foreign Secretary. His great-grandfather, Sir C. Sankaran Nair, was a president of the Indian National Congress in 1897, so far the only Malayali to hold this position.

Menon did his schooling at Scindia School, Gwalior. He then completed his B.A. (Hons.) degree and the M.A. degree in history from St. Stephen's College, Delhi.

== Career ==
Menon started his career in 1972 with the Indian Foreign Service.

He served in the Department of Atomic Energy (DAE) as Advisor to the Atomic Energy Commission. His work continued through his posting in Vienna. He was then posted to Beijing, the second of three postings he served in China. His last position in China as ambassador was also significant as it marked improvement in Sino-India relations, the high point being the visit of then Prime Minister Atal Bihari Vajpayee. Menon has also served as Ambassador to Israel and High Commissioner to Sri Lanka and Pakistan. He was appointed Foreign Secretary in 2006, and was the National Security Advisor to Prime Minister Dr. Manmohan Singh. He relinquished office as India's 4th National Security Advisor on 15 May 2014. He is also a Visiting Professor of International Relations at Ashoka University.

A major milestone of his career was the Indo-US nuclear deal, for which he had worked hard to convince NSG member nations along with Shyam Saran to get a clean waiver for nuclear supplies to India.

Menon joined the Brookings Institution (USA) as a distinguished fellow and also serves as chairman of the advisory board of the Institute of Chinese Studies based in New Delhi. He has been a Fisher Family Fellow at the Kennedy School, Harvard University 2015 and Richard Wilhelm Fellow at MIT in 2015. He was chosen to be one of the “Top 100 Global Thinkers” by Foreign Policy magazine in 2010.

He joined the Institute of South Asian Studies at National University of Singapore as a Distinguished Visiting Fellow in November 2017.

== Publications ==
- Choices: Inside the Making of India's Foreign Policy. 2016. Brookings Institution Press. Penguin.
- India and Asian Geopolitics: The Past, Present. 2021. Brookings Institution Press.

Menon wrote "Choices: Inside The Making of Indian Foreign Policy" that was first published in 2016 and was based on his experience as National Security Advisor of India.

== Personal life ==
He is married to Mohini Menon and has a daughter and a son. His mother tongue is Malayalam and he also speaks Hindi, English, Chinese and German.

He has interests in classical music and the Himalayas. The Scindia School conferred on Shivshankar Menon the 'Madhav Award' as an alumnus of eminence for the year 2000.

== Honours ==
- Order of the Rising Sun, 2nd Class, Gold and Silver Star (2022)

== See also ==
- Vijay Gokhale
- Dr. S Jaishankar

Diplomatic posts
Preceded by Pradeep Kumar Singh	Ambassador of India to Israel; 1995 - 1997	Succeeded by Ranjan Mathai
Preceded by N. Dayal	High Commissioner of India to Sri Lanka; 1997 - 2000	Succeeded by Gopalkrishna Gandhi
Preceded by Vijay K. Nambiar	Ambassador of India to China; 2000 - 2003	Succeeded by Nalin Surie
Preceded by Vijay K. Nambiar	High Commissioner of India to Pakistan; 2003 - 2006	Succeeded by Satyabrata Pal
Preceded by Shyam Saran	Foreign Secretary of India; 2006 - 2009	Succeeded by Nirupama Rao
Political offices
Preceded by M. K. Narayanan	National Security Advisor; 2010 - 2014	Succeeded by Ajit Doval
