= Fernando Reinares =

Spanish radicalization expert and academic (born 1960)

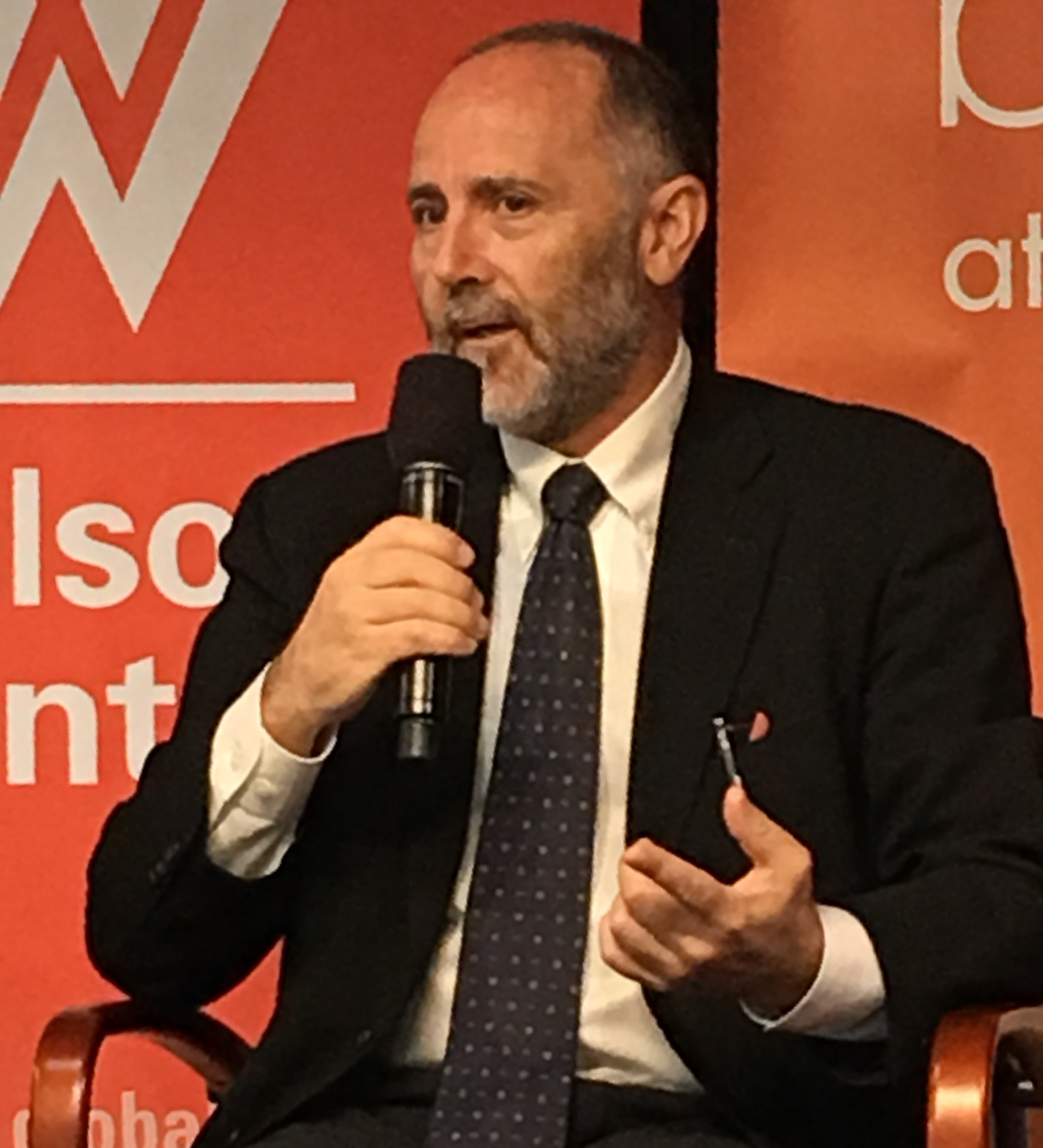
- Born: 1960 (age 65–66); Logroño, La Rioja, Spain

Academic work
- Discipline: Terrorism
- Sub-discipline: Radicalization
- Institutions: Universidad Rey Juan Carlos; Georgetown University

Fernando Reinares (born 1960 in Logroño) is a specialist in terrorism, especially the process of radicalization. Currently, he is Professor of Political Science and Security Studies at Universidad Rey Juan Carlos in Madrid, Spain.

== Career ==
He served a term as Senior Adviser on Antiterrorist Policy to the Spanish Minister of Interior following the 2004 Madrid train bombings, where he was engaged in adapting national security structures to the challenges of international terrorism. Afterward, he was appointed Director of the Program on Global Terrorism at the Real Instituto Elcano, a Spanish think tank. He also teaches postgraduate courses at General Gutiérrez Mellado University Institute and Ortega y Gasset University Institute.

Reinares is an advisor to the Center for Global Counter-Terrorism Cooperation, and he belongs to the United Nations roster of experts on terrorism prevention. The terrorism studies program board at the University of St. Andrews. Reinares is a member of the Council on Global Terrorism established by the Atlantic Monthly Foundation and of the academic committee of the Queen Sofía Center for the Study of Violence. He is Chairman of the European Commission expert group on violent radicalization and Academic Director of the Permanent Seminar on Terrorism Studies at Ortega y Gasset Foundation.

He is a Contributing Editor to Studies in Conflict and Terrorism and belongs to the editorial boards of Terrorism and Political Violence, Democracy and Security, Cultures et Conflits, and Sécurité Globale.

He was invited to join the Woodrow Wilson International Center for Scholars in Washington, D.C., as Public Policy Scholar in 2011.

== Works ==
- Reinares, Fernando (2014). ¡Matadlos! Quién estuvo detrás del 11-M y por qué se atentó en España. Madrid: Galaxia Gutenberg.

== Sources ==
- Real Instituto Elcano: Investigadores, ayudantes de investigación y colaboradores
- International Security Forum - Fernando Reinares
