= Sanjay Subrahmanyam =

Indian historian (born 1961)

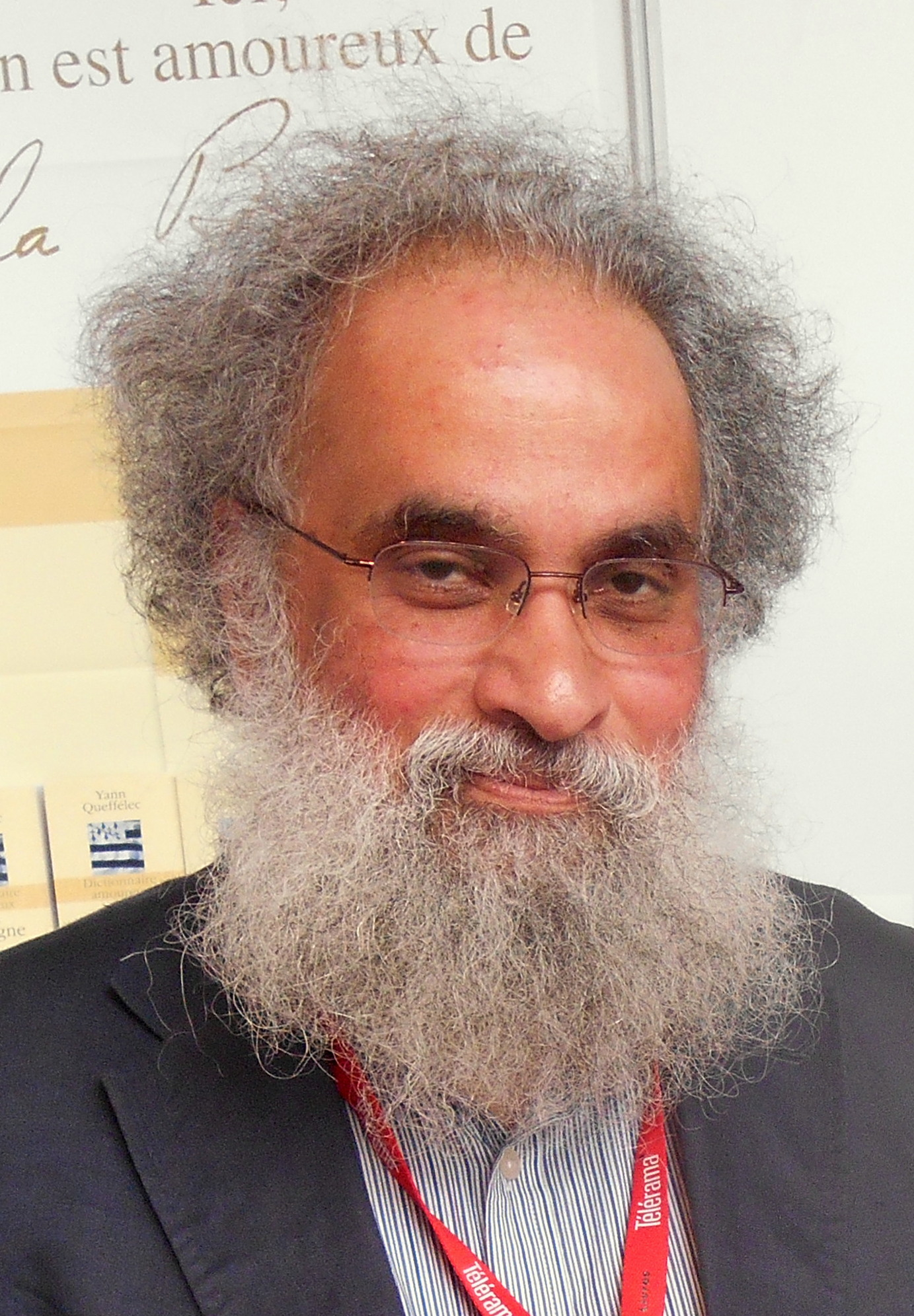
- Born: 21 May 1961; New Delhi, India
- Citizenship: United States
- Education: St. Stephen's College, Delhi (BA); Delhi School of Economics (MA) (Ph.D)
- Occupations: Historian; Professor
- Employer: University of California, Los Angeles
- Parent: K. Subrahmanyam (father)
- Relatives: S. Jaishankar (brother)

Sanjay Subrahmanyam (born 21 May 1961) is an Indian-American historian of the early modern period. He holds the Irving and Jean Stone Endowed Chair in Social Sciences at the University of California, Los Angeles, having joined UCLA in 2004.

== Background and education ==
Sanjay Subramanyam was born on 21 May 1961 in New Delhi, India. He is the son of Indian civil servant K. Subrahmanyam and his wife Sulochana. Subramanyam was brought up in a Tamil Brahmin family. He has an elder sister and two elder brothers. His brother S. Jaishankar is a diplomat and politician.

Sanjay Subrahmanyam graduated with a BA in economics from St. Stephen's College, Delhi. He received his MA and PhD in economic history from the Delhi School of Economics with the dissertation Trade and the Regional Economy of South India, c. 1550–1650 (1987).

== Work ==
Subrahmanyam joined UCLA in 2004 after teaching at the University of Oxford, where he held the position of professor of economic history from 1993 to 1995. From 1995 to 2002, he was directeur d’études at the School for Advanced Studies in the Social Sciences, working on the economic and social history of early modern India and the Indian Ocean. In 2002, he became the first holder of the Chair in Indian History and Culture at Oxford.

At UCLA, Subrahmanyam served as founding director of the Center for India and South Asia from 2005 to 2011. His teaching covers medieval and early modern South Asian and Indian Ocean history, European expansion, comparative empires, and global historical methods. He has supervised graduate research on Indian history and the Iberian empires. His work is associated with the concept of "connected histories".

Bryn Mawr College selected Subrahmanyam as the 2009 Mary Flexner Lecturer. In 2013, he was elected to Chair in Early Modern Global History at the Collège de France, where he delivered lectures during 2013–2014 and subsequently served as a visiting professor until 2021.

Subrahmanyam’s scholarship spans several areas of early modern history. His early works, including The Political Economy of Commerce (1990), contributed to the study of the Indian Ocean. In collaboration with Velcheru Narayana Rao and David Shulman, he co-authored Symbols of Substance (1992) and Textures of Time (2001), which examine South Indian cultural and political history, along with Penumbral Visions (2001). With Muzaffar Alam, he co-authored Indo-Persian Travels in the Age of Discoveries (2007), Writing the Mughal World (2011), and later Mirrors of Empire (2026), focusing on Mughal and early modern Islamic historiography.

He has also written books on the Iberian empires, including Improvising Empire (1990), The Portuguese Empire in Asia (1993), and The Career and Legend of Vasco da Gama (1997). His essays on global and comparative history are collected in Explorations in Connected History (2005). Later works include Three Ways to Be Alien (2011), Courtly Encounters (2012), Europe’s India: Words, People, Empires, 1500–1800 (2017), Empires Between Islam and Christianity, 1500–1800 (2018), Faut-il universaliser l’histoire? (2020), Les Peuples de l’Orient au milieu du XVIe siècle (2022), Imperios Entrelazados en los orígenes del mundo moderno (2024), and Across the Green Sea: Histories from the Western Indian Ocean, 1440–1640 (2024).

== Accolades ==
In 2012, Subrahmanyam was awarded the first Infosys Prize in Humanities, for his "path-breaking contribution to history." He also served as a Humanities jury member for the prize from 2019 to 2022.

Historian Srinath Raghavan wrote of Subrahmanyam in 2013:

His scholarship spans the entire early modern period, from the 15th to 18th centuries CE, and more besides. Similarly, his geographical expertise stretches from South, South-East and West Asia to Western Europe and Latin America. Then there are his technical skills, ranging from statistical analysis of economic data to interpretation of literary and visual materials. Although Subrahmanyam began as an economic historian, he has branched out to work on political, intellectual and cultural history. He works in over ten European and Asian languages and draws on sources from a dazzling array of archives. Finally, there is his sheer productivity. Subrahmanyam seems to write top-class history faster than most of us can read.

He was elected to the American Academy of Arts and Sciences in 2009 and as an international fellow to the British Academy in 2016.

On 6 February 2017, Subrahmanyam received an honorary doctorate from UCLouvain.

The Prix Martine Aublet for 2018 was awarded to Subrahmanyam for his book L'Inde sous les yeux de l'Europe: mots, peuples, empires (Alma Editeur, 2018), by the Musée du Quai Branly.

In February 2019, Sanjay Subrahmanyam was awarded the Dan David Prize for History (jointly with Kenneth Pomeranz).

In 2022, Sanjay Subrahmanyam was awarded the International Committee of Historical Sciences Prize in History at the XXIII Congress of the Historical Sciences in Poznań, Poland.

== Selected publications ==
=== As author ===
- The Political Economy of Commerce: Southern India, 1500–1650. Cambridge University Press, 1990. Doctoral thesis.
- Improvising Empire: Portuguese Trade and Settlement in the Bay of Bengal, 1500–1700. Delhi: Oxford University Press, 1990.
- The Portuguese Empire in Asia, 1500–1700: A Political and Economic History. Longman, 1993.
- The Career and Legend of Vasco da Gama. Cambridge University Press, 1997.
- Penumbral Visions: Making Polities in Early Modern South India. Oxford University Press/University of Michigan Press, 2001.
- Explorations in Connected History: From the Tagus to the Ganges. Delhi: Oxford University Press, 2004.
- Explorations in Connected History: Mughals and Franks. Delhi: Oxford University Press, 2004.
- Three Ways to be Alien: Travails and Encounters in the Early Modern World. Brandeis University Press, 2011.
- Courtly Encounters: Translating Courtliness and Violence in Early Modern Eurasia. Harvard University Press, 2012.
- Is 'Indian Civilization' a Myth?: Fictions and Histories. Ranikhet: Permanent Black, 2013
- Aux origines de l'histoire globale. Paris: Fayard, 2014.
- Europe's India: words, people, empires 1500–1800. Harvard University Press, 2017.
- Empires Between Islam and Christianity, 1500-1800. State University of New York Press, 2019.
- Faut-il universaliser l’histoire? Entre dérives nationalistes et identitaires. Paris: CNRS editions, 2020.
- Connected History: Essays and Arguments. Verso, 2022.

=== As co-author ===
- Symbols of Substance: Court and State in Nayaka-period Tamil Nadu (with Velcheru Narayana Rao and David Shulman). Delhi: Oxford University Press, 1992.
- Textures of Time: Writing History in South India, 1600–1800 (with Velcheru Narayana Rao and David Shulman). New Delhi: Permanent Black, 2001.
- Indo-Persian Travels in the Age of Discoveries, 1400–1800 (with Muzaffar Alam). Cambridge University Press, 2007.
- Writing the Mughal World (with Muzaffar Alam). Permanent Black/Columbia University Press, 2011.

=== As editor/co-editor ===
- Merchants, Markets and the State in Early Modern India. Delhi: Oxford University Press, 1990.
- Money and the Market in India, 1100–1700. Delhi: Oxford University Press, 1994.
- Merchant Networks in the Early Modern World. Aldershot: Variorum Books, 1996.
- Unravelling the Nation: Sectarian Conflict and India's Secular Identity (with Kaushik Basu). New Delhi: Penguin Books, 1996.
- Institutions and Economic Change in South Asia (with Burton Stein). Delhi: Oxford University Press, 1996.
- The Mughal State, 1526–1750 (with Muzaffar Alam). Delhi: Oxford University Press, 1998.
- Sinners and Saints: The Successors of Vasco da Gama. Delhi: Oxford University Press, 1998.
- Society and Circulation: Mobile People and Itinerant Cultures in South Asia 1750–1950 (with Claude Markovits and Jacques Pouchepadass). New Delhi: Permanent Black, 2003.
- Land, Politics and Trade in South Asia. Delhi: Oxford University Press, 2004.
- From Biography to History: Essays in the History of Portuguese Asia (1500–1800) (with Kenneth McPherson). New Delhi: TransBooks, 2006.
- The Age of Revolutions in Global Context, c. 1760-1840 (with David Armitage). Basingstoke: Palgrave Macmillan, 2009.
- The Cambridge World History, Vol. VI: The Construction of a Global World, 1400-1800 CE (with Jerry H. Bentley and Merry E. Wiesner-Hanks). Cambridge University Press, 2015.
- Historical Teleologies in the Modern World (with Henning Trüper and Dipesh Chakrabarty). London: Bloomsbury, 2015.
