= List of high commissioners of India to Pakistan =

High Commissioner of India to Pakistan
- Incumbent; Ms Geetika srivastava (Deputy High Commissioner)
- Residence: G-5 Diplomatic Enclave, Islamabad
- Nominator: President of India
- Appointer: Ministry of External Affairs
- Term length: Not fixed
- Formation: 1947
- First holder: Sri Prakasa
- Website: High Commission of India, Islamabad

The following people have served as high commissioners or ambassadors from India to Pakistan. Pakistan vacated its membership in the Commonwealth of Nations from January 1972 until August 1989. From 1999 until 2004, and during 2007–2008, Pakistan was suspended from the Commonwealth of Nations.

After the Abrogation of Article 370 in August 2019, Pakistan downgraded diplomatic ties with India, suspending the then-Indian High Commissioner. Since then, the mission is being headed by the Charge d'Affaires.

In August 2023, a 2005-batch IFS officer, Geetika Srivastava was appointed Charge d'Affaires, becoming the first woman to head the Indian mission in Pakistan.

== List of high commissioners to Pakistan ==
=== High commissioners of India to the Dominion of Pakistan (1947–1956) ===
Name	Entered office	Left office
Sri Prakasa	1947	1949
Sita Ram	1949	1951
Mohan Singh Mehta	1952	1955
Chandulal Chunilal Desai	1955	1956

=== High commissioners of India to the Islamic Republic of Pakistan (1956–1971) ===
Name	Entered office	Left office
Chandulal Chunilal Desai	1956	1958
Rajeshwar Dayal	1958	1962
G Parthasarathi	1962	1965
Kewal Singh	1965	1966
Samar Sen	1968	1969
B. K. Acharya	1969	1971
Jai Kumar Atal	October 1971	December 1971

(Suspension of diplomatic relations following the 1971 Indo-Pakistani War)

=== Ambassadors of India to the Islamic Republic of Pakistan (1976–1989) ===
Name	Entered office	Left office
Katyayani Shankar Bajpai	1976	1980
Natwar Singh	1980	1982
K. D. Sharma	1982	1985
S. K. Singh	1985	1989
J. N. Dixit	April 1989	August 1989

=== High commissioners of India to the Islamic Republic of Pakistan (1989–1999) ===
Name	Entered office	Left office
J. N. Dixit	August 1989	November 1991
Satinder Kumar Lambah	January 1992	July 1995
Satish Chandra	August 1995	December 1998
Gopalaswami Parthasarathy	February 1999	October 1999

=== Ambassadors of India to the Islamic Republic of Pakistan (1999–2004) ===
Name	Entered office	Left office
Gopalaswami Parthasarathy	October 1999	May 2000
Vijay K. Nambiar	August 2000	December 2001
Suspension of diplomatic relations until 2003
Shivshankar Menon	July 2003	May 2004

=== High commissioners of India to the Islamic Republic of Pakistan (2004–2007) ===
Name	Entered office	Left office
Shivshankar Menon	May 2004	September 2006
Satyabrata Pal	September 2006	November 2007

=== Ambassadors of India to the Islamic Republic of Pakistan (2007–2008) ===
Name	Entered office	Left office
Satyabrata Pal	November 2007	May 2008

=== High commissioners of India to the Islamic Republic of Pakistan (2008–present) ===
Name	Entered office	Left office
Satyabrata Pal	May 2008	February 2009
Sharat Sabharwal	April 2009	June 2013
TCA Raghavan	July 2013	December 2015
Gautam Bambawale	December 2015	September 2017
Ajay Bisaria	September 2017	August 2019
After the Revocation of the special status of Jammu and Kashmir in August 2019, Pakistan downgraded diplomatic ties with India. Since then, the diplomatic mission is being headed by the Charge d'Affaires.
Gaurav Ahluwalia (Charge d'Affaires)	?	2020
M. Suresh Kumar (Charge d'Affaires)	2020	2023
Geetika Srivastava (Charge d'Affaires)	since 2023	Incumbent
