= List of high commissioners of India to Singapore =

Head of mission of India to Singapore

High Commissioner of India to Singapore
- Incumbent; Shilpak Ambule since 23 July 2023
- Ministry of External Affairs
- Style: His Excellency
- Reports to: Minister for External Affairs
- Seat: Singapore
- Appointer: President of India
- Website: India High Commission, Singapore

The high commissioner of India to Singapore is the chief diplomatic representative of India to Singapore. The High Commission is located at 31, Grange Road, Singapore 239702.

As a Commonwealth country, Indian diplomatic missions in the capital cities of other Commonwealth member states are known as High Commissions.

The high commission is headed by the high commissioner.

== List ==
S. No.	Name	Tenure
1	S. S. Alirajpur	June 1966–November 1968
2	Prem Bhatia	March 1969–February 1973
3	T. Abraham	March 1973–August 1975
4	V. Siddarthachary	October 1975–August 1978
5	B. M. Oza	September 1978–July 1981
6	C. Dasgupta	September 1981–December 1983
7	A. N. G. Pillai	January 1984–December 1985
8	K. Sankaran Nair	April 1986–April 1988
9	Y. M. Tiwari	May 1988–July 1993
10	B. M. C. Nayar	August 1993–July 1995
11	Prem Singh	August 1995–July 2000
12	P. P. Shukla	October 2000–January 2004
13	Alok Prasad	March 2004–December 2006
14	S. Jaishankar	January 2007–August 2009
15	T. C. A. Raghavan	October 2009–June 2013
16	Vijay Thakur Singh	June 2013–October 2016
17	Jawed Ashraf	November 2016–July 2020
18	P. Kumaran	July 2020–July 2023
19	Shilpak Ambule	23 July 2023–

== See also ==
- India–Singapore relations
