= Saumya Balsari =

British-Indian author

Saumya Balsari is a British Indian author. Balsari has been named one of Britain's leading South Asian women by redhotcurry.com. She is a Senior Member of Darwin College, University of Cambridge, and currently researching her third novel. She was formerly Writer-in-Residence at the University of Cambridge, Centre of Latin American Studies. Her first novel, "The Cambridge Curry Club", is the 2010 winner of the first ever Cambridgeshire Book of the Decade. The book was selected at Cambridge Wordfest 2012 by Oxygen Books, City Picks, for a public reading of Cambridge's finest writing.Cambridge Wordfest 2012 The title was also chosen for The National Year of Reading and by BBC Radio Cambridgeshire for its 2008 A Book a Day project in May. Balsari's writing has been favourably compared by Alexander McCall Smith to that of Booker Prize Winners Arundhati Roy and Kiran Desai. Her second book was Summer of Blue, a novel for young adults, published in 2013 as an ebook (Arcadia Books) and paperback. Eminent reviewers of her work include the well-known actress and author Meera Syal and television comedy writer Ronald Wolfe (Writing Comedy).

== Biography ==
Saumya Balsari was born in Mumbai (previously Bombay), India. She has a double master's degrees in English and German Literature and a First in Italian. She was a PhD candidate at the University of Copenhagen, Denmark (1995-1999). Early in her career, Balsari worked at the Max Mueller Bhavan (Goethe Institute), as a freelance translator for German and French and as a journalist contributing to leading publications.

Moving to Denmark in 1987, Balsari had a teaching stint at the (United Nations-designated) International College (Denmark), with sabbaticals in Brazil and Australia. After relocating to the United Kingdom, she worked in London as a lifestyle columnist for the Bombay Times (Times of India) and humour columnist for The Hindustan Times (UK Edition).

Balsari's play The Curry Club had a rehearsed reading by the Kali Theatre Company at the Soho Theatre in 2003. Her novel The Cambridge Curry Club, published in 2004 by Black Amber Publications and reprinted again in 2008 and 2011 by Arcadia, was based on the play. The book launch took place both at the Nehru Centre London and Heffers, Cambridge. The Cambridge Curry Club won the Cambridgeshire Book of the Decade award in 2010 and was longlisted for the Vodafone Crossword Book Award in India. It is also available as an Arcadia ebook title.

The novel has been used as a postcolonial resource text at the University of Turku (Finland) and University of Bayreuth (Germany), and as a reference in international doctoral dissertations.

Balsari's short stories (e.g. The Cutpiece) have appeared in publications by Walden Writers. The Taj by Moonlight appears in Marlow Weaver's anthology A Long and Winding Road (USA).

An early version of Summer of Blue received a commendation from the Yeovil Literary Prize Committee, 2009/Betty Bolingbroke-Kent Award. It is an ebook with Arcadia Publishers. The novel has also been the subject of academic papers.

Balsari is a member of the Society of Authors and East Anglian Writers. She is a former member (2015-2017) of High Table, Newnham College, University of Cambridge. She is a speaker and honorary advisor at various literary festivals.

== Personal History ==
Saumya Balsari has homes in Cambridge, London and Mumbai and travels widely. She was on the 2013 Asian Power Couples Hot 100 list. She has acquired some knowledge of twelve European, Middle Asian and Asian languages.
