= The India Way: Strategies for an Uncertain World =

2020 book by S. Jaishankar

- First edition cover
- Author: S. Jaishankar
- Language: English
- Subject: Geopolitics
- Published: 2020
- Publisher: Harper Collins
- Publication place: India
- Media type: Print
- Pages: 240
- ISBN: 978-9390163878
- Followed by: Why Bharat Matters

The India Way: Strategies for an Uncertain World is a 2020 book by Indian politician and author S. Jaishankar who serves as the Minister of External Affairs of the Government of India. This is his first book where he discusses India's geopolitical strategy since independence along with India's historical statecraft, the impact of colonization, and the country's journey towards rediscovering its unique identity in the global arena.

== Synopsis ==
The India Way: Strategies for an Uncertain World by Jaishankar provides a comprehensive analysis of India's geopolitical strategy since independence. The book delves into India's historical statecraft, the impact of colonization, and the country's journey towards rediscovering its unique identity in the global arena. Jaishankar discusses India's economic, political, and security calculations, shedding light on past alignments and their implications.

He emphasizes the need for India to navigate the complexities of a multipolar world and outlines potential policy responses to address contemporary challenges. Through a blend of history, tradition, and modern realities, Jaishankar positions India as a significant player on the world stage, offering valuable insights for students of modern Indian strategy and policymakers globally.

== Reception ==
In his review for Hindustan Times, Harsh V. Pant, a professor of International Relations at King's College London, wrote that the book covers wide range of topics including the emerging global order, rise of regional powers such as China, nationalism along with its discontents, while evaluating the Indian strategy through the Mahabharata prism. Pant also noted Jaishankar's acknowledgement of "the inherent contradictions in India's engagements in multiple groupings" but an absence regarding what costs underline this approach. He remarked that while the book has many admirable aspects, it leaves "a nagging feeling that the author has held back as much as he has revealed".

Writing for The Hindu, Stanley Johny stated that India Way offers "an authoritative account of New Delhi’s worldview" as a foreign policy framework, however its success can be known fully "only when tested on the altar of history".

The book was reviewed by Arvind Gupta at Indian Foreign Affairs Journal, calling the book "a [Useful] analysis of Indian approaches dealing with the turbulence caused by the rapid shifting of the global balance of power."

The book was also reviewed by various scholars at Democracy and Security, India Quarterly, and South Asia Research.
