= List of ambassadors of India to the Czech Republic =

Ambassador of India to the Czech Republic
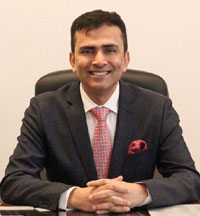
- Incumbent; Raveesh Kumar since 2024
- Type: Ambassador
- Member of: Indian Foreign Service
- Reports to: Ministry of External Affairs
- Appointer: President of India
- Term length: No fixed tenure
- Deputy: Deputy Chief of Mission
- Website: Indian Ambassador to the Czech Republic

The Ambassador of India to the Czech Republic is the chief diplomatic representative of India to the Czech Republic. The embassy is located in Milady Horákové 60/93, 170 00 Prague 7.

The embassy is headed by the Ambassador. The following people have served as Ambassadors to the Czechoslovakia, Czech and Slovak Federative Republic and the Czech Republic.

== List of Indian Ambassadors ==
Name	Entered office	Left office
Czechoslovakia
N. Raghavan	1950	
Dharma Vira, OBE, ICS	1954	1957
Jagan Nath Khosla	1957	1958
Bijoy Krishna Acharya	1959	1962
Mohan Prakash Mathur	1962	1965
Jagan Nath Dhamija	1966	1969
Shailen Hiralal Desai	1970	1973
Venkata Siddharthacharry	1973	1975
Surendra Singh Alirajpur	1976	1979
Kishan Kumar Shivsinhji Rana	1979	1981
Nedungottu Philip Alexander	1981	1984
Uday Chand Soni	1984	1988
Czech and Slovak Federative Republic
Bhupatray M. Oza	1988	1992
Czech Republic
David C. Manners	1992	1995
Girish Dhume	1995	2000
Subrahmanyam Jaishankar	2000	2004
P. S. Raghavan	2004	2007
Dinkar Prakash Srivastava	2008	2011
Venkatesan Ashok	2011	2014
Krishan Kumar	2015	2018
Narinder Chauhan	2018	2020
Hemant H. Kotalwar	2020	2024
Raveesh Kumar	2024	Incumbent

== See also ==
- Czech Republic–India relations
