= Sharat Sabharwal =

Indian diplomat

Indian ambassador to Pakistan
- In office 2009–2013
- Preceded by: Satyabrata Pal
- Succeeded by: TCA Raghavan

Personal details
- Occupation: Civil servant IFS

Sharat Sabharwal is an Indian civil servant and career diplomat. He served for some years as the Indian High Commissioner to Pakistan.

== Career ==
Sabharwal is a covenanted Civil servant and a career diplomat, and a member of the 1975 batch of the Indian Foreign Service. As a civil servant and career diplomat, he held several positions of responsibility, including as:

- Deputy Permanent Representative of India to the UN in Geneva (1999-2002)
- Ambassador to Uzbekistan.
- High Commissioner to Pakistan, appointed in March 2009.
- Member of the Central Information Commission. This position has little or no connection with foreign affairs or diplomacy. He was nevertheless appointed in November 2013 and held office for nearly four years, until September 2017.

== See also ==
- Indian Ambassadors to Pakistan
