= Pavan Varma =

Indian politician and former diplomat

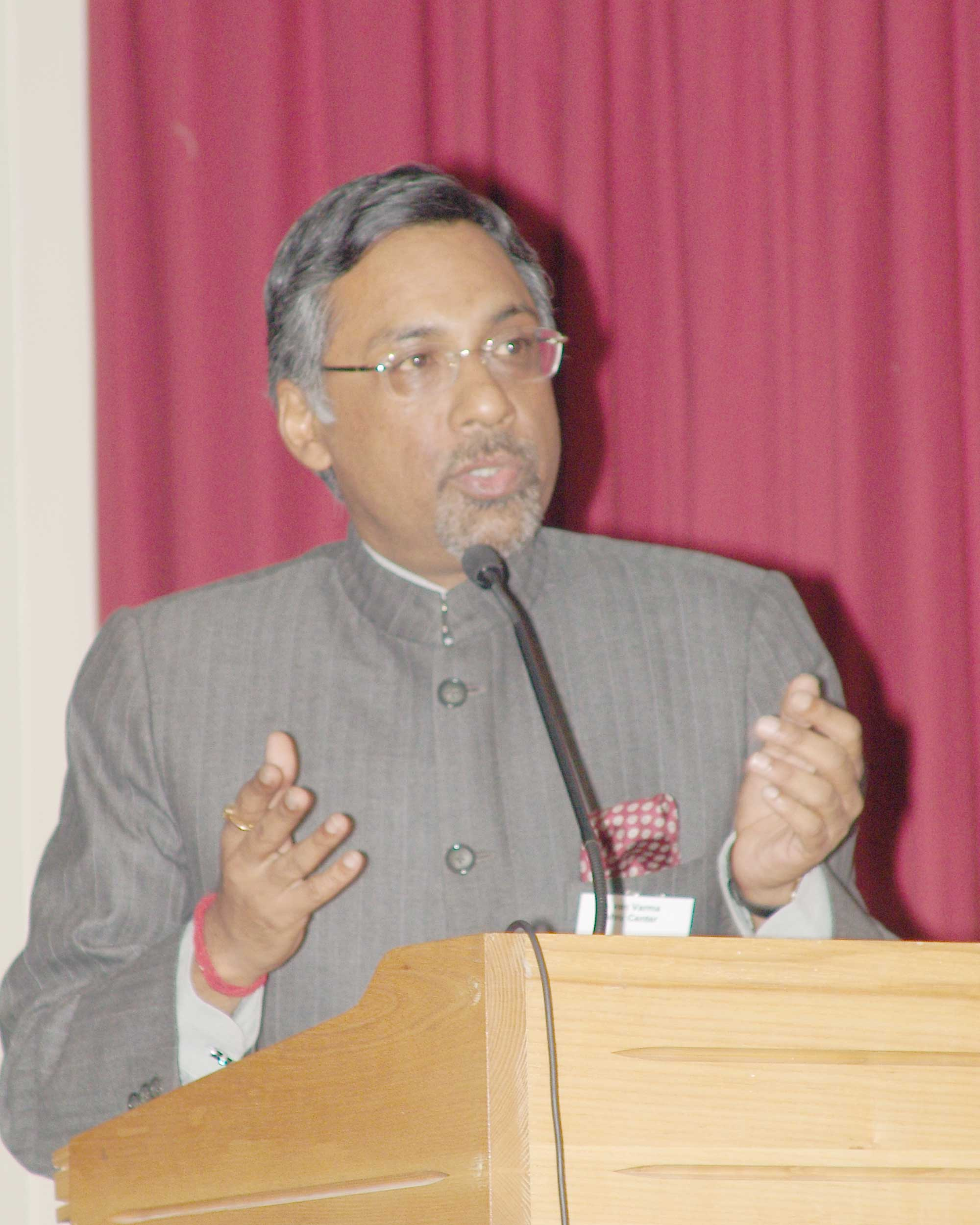
- Varma speaking at a book launch in Nehru Centre, London, in 2005, when he was its director

National Chief Spokesperson Jan Suraaj Party
- Incumbent
- Assumed office 23 January 2025

General Secretary of Janata Dal (United)
- In office 10 November 2016 – 29 January 2020

MP of Rajya Sabha for Bihar
- In office 23 June 2014 – 7 July 2016

Indian Ambassador to Bhutan
- In office May 2009 – January 2013
- Preceded by: Sudhir Vyas
- Succeeded by: VP Haran

Indian High Commissioner to Cyprus
- In office 8 August 2001 – 23 January 2004
- Preceded by: Shyamala B Cowsik
- Succeeded by: Neelam D. Sabharwal

Personal details
- Born: Pavan Kumar Varma; 5 November 1953 (age 72) Nagpur, India
- Party: Jan Suraaj Party
- Other political affiliations: Trinamool Congress (2021–2022); Janata Dal (United) (2016–2020)

Pavan K. Varma (born 5 November 1953) is an Indian politician, author, and former diplomat who served as India's Ambassador to Bhutan and High Commissioner to Cyprus. He has also served as the Member of Parliament in the Rajya Sabha representing Bihar. He is also a widely published author, known for his works on Indian culture, identity, and politics.

== Early life and education ==
Varma a native of Ghazipur, Uttar Pradesh was born on 5 November 1953 in Nagpur, Madhya Pradesh (now Maharashtra). He graduated with a degree in History from St. Stephen's College, University of Delhi, where he stood first in his class. He subsequently obtained a degree in law from the Faculty of Law, University of Delhi. He joined the Indian Foreign Service in 1976.

== Career ==
=== Diplomatic career ===
Varma joined the Indian Foreign Service in 1976. Over the course of his diplomatic career, he held several key positions, including Press Secretary to the President of India, Spokesperson of the Ministry of External Affairs, Joint Secretary for Africa, High Commissioner of India to Cyprus, Director of the Nehru Centre in London, Director General of the Indian Council for Cultural Relations, and Ambassador of India to Bhutan.

=== Political career ===
In June 2014, he was elected to the Rajya Sabha, the upper house of India's Parliament, representing the state of Bihar. He served in this capacity until July 2016. During this period, he was also appointed as the National General Secretary and National Spokesperson of the Janata Dal (United).

Varma served as the National General Secretary of the JD(U) until 29 January 2020. He subsequently joined the Trinamool Congress on 23 November 2021 and was appointed the party's National Vice-President on 19 December 2021. He resigned from the post and left the party on 12 August 2022, following political realignments in Bihar associated with the formation of the Mahagathbandhan (Grand Alliance) government.

=== Literary career ===
Varma is a noted author and commentator on Indian culture, history, and society. He has written both non-fiction and translations, contributing significantly to public discourse through his publications. Some of his notable works include:

- Ghalib: The Man, The Times (1989)
- Krishna: The Playful Divine (1993)
- The Great Indian Middle Class (1998)
- Being Indian: The Truth About Why the 21st Century Will Be India's (2004)
- Becoming Indian: The Unfinished Revolution of Culture and Identity (2010)
- Chanakya's New Manifesto (2013)
- Adi Shankaracharya: Hinduism's Greatest Thinker (2018)
- The Greatest Ode to Lord Ram: Tulsidas's Ramcharitmanas (2021)

Varma has also translated the poetry of prominent Indian figures including Kaifi Azmi, Atal Bihari Vajpayee, and Gulzar into English. Varma is a regular columnist, with his articles appearing in publications such as The Times of India, The Asian Age, and other national and regional newspapers and journals.

== Honours and recognition ==
In 2005, Varma was awarded an honorary doctoral degree by the University of Indianapolis in recognition of his contributions to diplomacy, literature, culture, and aesthetics. During his tenure as Ambassador to Bhutan, he was conferred the Druk Thuksey Award, Bhutan's highest civilian honour, by His Majesty the King of Bhutan. He remains the only serving Indian Ambassador to Bhutan to have received this distinction.

Varma has also received the Lifetime Achievement Award from his alma mater, St. Xavier's School, Delhi, and the Distinguished Alumnus Award from St. Stephen's College, Delhi. In February 2019, he was presented with the inaugural Wordsmith Award at the Words Count Festival in Pune. The same year, he was also honoured with the Kalinga International Literary Award for his contributions to Indian literature and public discourse.

== Bibliography ==
=== Fiction ===
- Pavan K. Varma (2012). When Loss is Gain. Rain Tree. ISBN 978-81-291-1941-4.
- Pavan K. Varma (2026). The Lady Who Carried the Monk Across the River. Penguin India. ISBN 978-93-730-3754-7.

=== Non-fiction ===
- Pavan Kumar Varma (1989). Ghalib, the man, the times. Viking.
- Pavan K. Varma (1992). Havelis of Old Delhi. Bookwise (India).
- Pavan K. Varma (1993). Krishna, the playful divine. Viking.
- Pavan K. Varma (1996). Yudhishtar and Draupadi. Penguin Books India.
- Pavan K. Varma (1998). The great Indian middle class. Viking.
- Pavan K. Varma (1 April 2004). Being Indian: the truth about why the twenty-first century will be India's. Viking.
- Pavan K. Varma; Sandhya Mulchandani (1 June 2004). Love and lust: an anthology of erotic literature from ancient and medieval India. HarperCollins Publishers a joint venture with India Today Group.
- Pavan K. Varma (1 February 2007). Kamasutra: The Art of Making Love to a Woman. Roli Books Private, Limited. ISBN 978-81-7436-448-7.
- Pavan K. Varma (2010). Becoming Indian: The Unfinished Revolution of Culture and Identity. Penguin Books India. ISBN 978-0-670-08346-6.
- Pavan K. Varma (2018). Adi Shankaracharya: Hinduism's Greatest Thinker. Tranquebar. ISBN 978-81-9365-561-0.

As a sequel to The Great Indian Middle Class in 1998, he, in association with journalist Renuka Khandekar, published Maximize Your Life: An Action Plan for the Indian Middle Class (Viking 2000). His 2004 Being Indian was published by William Heinemann, in the United Kingdom, as Being Indian: Inside the Real India in March 2005. Adi Shankaracharya: Hinduism's Greatest Thinker has translated and published in various Indian languages.

=== Translations ===
- Selected Poems: Kaifi Azmi (Viking/Penguin 2001) is the English translation of the Urdu poems of Kaifi Azmi.
- 21 Poems (Viking/Penguin), a translation in English of the Hindi poems of Atal Bihari Vajpayee, the then Prime Minister of India, was published in December 2001.
- Selected Poems: Gulzar (Penguin) a translated collection of the poems of Gulzar into English, one of India's best-known poets, came out in April 2008.
- Neglected Poems, Pavan K. Varma's second volume of the English translations of Gulzar's poems was launched at the Jaipur Literary Festival in January 2012.
- Green Poems: Gulzar, (Penguin, 2014) Pavan K. Varma's third volume of the English translation of Gulzar's poems.
- Suspected Poems: Gulzar, (Penguin, 2017) Pavan K. Varma's fourth volume of the English translation of Gulzar's poems.
