= Gautam Bambawale =

Indian diplomat

Indian Ambassador to China
- In office November 2017 – December 2018
- Preceded by: Vijay Keshav Gokhale
- Succeeded by: Vikram Misri

High Commissioner of India to Pakistan
- In office January 2016 – November 2017
- Preceded by: TCA Raghavan
- Succeeded by: Ajay Bisaria

Indian Ambassador to Bhutan
- In office August 2014 – December 2015
- Preceded by: V. P. Haran
- Succeeded by: Jaideep Sarkar

Personal details
- Born: 2 November 1958 (age 67)
- Spouse: Amite Bambawale née Sathe
- Children: Two sons
- Education: Bishop's School, Pune; Fergusson College; Gokhale Institute of Politics and Economics
- Occupation: Diplomat IFS

Gautam Bambawale (born 2 November 1958) is a retired Indian diplomat of the Indian Foreign Service who served as the Indian Ambassador to China from 2017 to 2018. He had previously served as the Indian High Commissioner to Pakistan.

== Personal life ==
Gautam was born to Hemant and Usha Bambawale. He grew up in Pune and studied at the Bishop's School and the Fergusson College. He obtained a Master's Degree in Economics from the Gokhale Institute of Politics and Economics. Bambawale's father is a physician while his mother has been a prominent social activist from Pune. In his youth, Gautam played badminton and captained the Fergusson College Cricket Team too. He speaks Mandarin Chinese and German fluently.

He married Amita Sathe. Amita has authored a book, "Dinner Décor: A How-to Guide for Fabulous Centerpieces".

Gautam and Amita have two sons: Harshavardhan and Vikram.

== Career ==
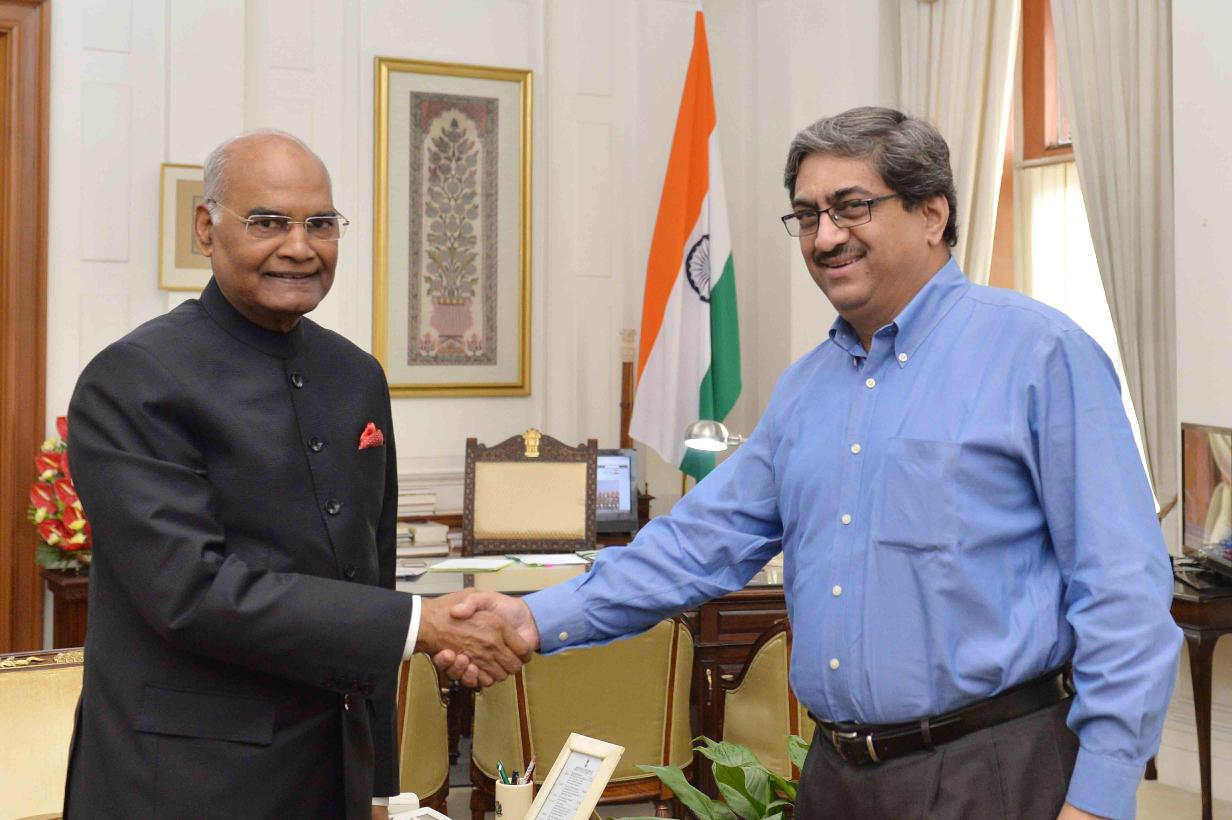
Gautam Bambawale meeting with the President of India, Ram Nath Kovind, at Rashtrapati Bhavan on 13 November 2017

Bambawale joined the Indian Foreign Service in August 1984. He studied Mandarin Chinese and served in the Indian missions at Hong Kong and Beijing from 1985 to 1991. Upon his return to the Ministry of External Affairs in New Delhi, he served as the first Desk Officer for China in the Ministry. From 1993 to 1994, Bambawale was the Director in the Americas Division of the Ministry.

From 1994 to 1998, he was the Director of the Indian Cultural Centre in Berlin where he dealt with Public diplomacy. From March 2001 to June 2002, he worked at the Ministry of External Affairs in New Delhi as the Staff Officer to the Foreign Secretary of India. Subsequently, he functioned at the Prime Minister's Office in New Delhi as the Deputy Chief in the Division of National Security Affairs, Defence and International Policy.

Bambawale was the Minister (Political) and Head of the Political Wing at the Indian Embassy in Washington, D.C. from July to September 2007. From September 2007 to December 2009, he served as India's first Consul General in Guangzhou. From December 2009 to July 2014, he was the Joint Secretary (East Asia) at the Ministry of External Affairs in New Delhi.

He also served as the Indian Ambassador to Bhutan from August 2014 to December 2015 and the High Commissioner of India to Pakistan from January 2016 to November 2017.

Bambawale is considered as an expert on China.

Bambawale is the Trustee and Senior Fellow at Pune International Centre- a Pune based non-partisan think tank, he is also the convenor of Asia Economic Dialogue, a 1.5 track geoeconomics dialogue held in collaboration with Ministry of External Affairs and Pune International Centre. He joined Ola Cabs in 2020, as a senior adviser for corporate and international affairs.
