= List of ambassadors of India to Bhutan =

Ambassador of India to Bhutan
- Incumbent; Sandeep Arya, IFS since September 2025
- Nominator: Droupadi Murmu
- Inaugural holder: Brajbir Saran Das
- Formation: 1968
- Website: Embassy of India, Bhutan

The Indian Ambassador to Bhutan is the chief diplomatic representative of India to Bhutan, housed in Thimphu.

== List of Indian Ambassadors to Bhutan ==
The following officers have served as Ambassadors of India to Bhutan.

Name	Term start	Term end
Brajbir Saran Das	1968	1972
Ashok B. Gokhale	1972	1974
Jagan Nath Khosla	1974	1977
Jagdish Rudraya Hiremath	1977	1980
Salman Haider	1980	1983
A.N. Ram	1983	1986
Nareshwar Dayal	1986	1989
Vinod C. Khanna	1989	1991
Pushkar Johari	1991	1995
Dalip Mehta	1995	1998
Pradeep Kumar Singh	1998	2000
Kanwar Singh Jasrotia	2000	2005
Sudhir Vyas	2005	2009
Pavan K. Varma	2009	January 2013
V.P. Haran.	January 2013	July 2014
Gautam Bambawale	August 2014	December 2015
Jaideep Sarkar	February 2016	February 2019
Ruchira Kamboj	February 2019	June 2022
Sudhakar Dalela	July 2022	August 2025
Sandeep Arya	September 2025	Incumbent
