= Why Bharat Matters =

2024 book by S. Jaishankar

- First edition
- Author: S. Jaishankar
- Language: English
- Subject: Geopolitics
- Published: 2024
- Publisher: Rupa & Co.
- Publication place: India
- Media type: Print
- Pages: 237
- ISBN: 978-9357026406
- Preceded by: The India Way: Strategies for an Uncertain World

Why Bharat Matters is a 2024 non-fictional book written by Indian politician and author S. Jaishankar, and published by Rupa Publications. Jaishankar was the incumbent Minister of External Affairs of the Government of India in the Second Modi ministry at the time of publishing.

In this work, Jaishankar discusses India's foreign policy and emphasises the importance of Bharat, i.e. India, with its ever-growing role on the global stage as a potential superpower.

== Synopsis ==
Why Bharat Matters is Jaishankar's second book, followed by his previous book The India Way: Strategies for an Uncertain World, in which he provided his analysis of India's geopolitical strategy since independence, along with India's historical statecraft and the impact of colonisation.

In Why Bharat Matters, Jaishankar delves deeper into India's foreign policy landscape, emphasising the country's cultural values and global ambitions. He explores the significance of India's historical heritage, particularly drawing insights from the epic Ramayana. It discusses India's evolving role in the global arena, emphasising the importance of transparent digital realms, resilient supply chains, and strategic economic decisions.

The book also addresses key initiatives implemented by Indian government such as 'SAGAR' and 'Neighbourhood First', showcasing India's surfacing as a positive force on the global stage. Through a blend of tradition, heritage, and modernity, Jaishankar portrays India as a confident and committed nation poised to play an important role in international affairs.

== Reception ==
Columnist and scholar Harshil Mehta, in his review for Firstpost, called the book important for encouraging debates over civilisational heritage of India and presenting views of the Modi government on international affairs.

In a review for The Indian Express, the editor C Raja Mohan praised the book for sparking much-needed debate about Jawaharlal Nehru's foreign policy. He further added that the book will help readers break away from the perspective that everything Indian foreign leadership did in the past was the correct choice for that moment. The New Indian Express hailed the book calling it a well-timed collection of historical essays that explores India’s foreign policy initiatives, that underscore major pivotal moments.

Writing for The Asian Age, editor Indranil Banerjie stated, the book is invaluable, but not reader-friendly, calling it a textbook on government foreign policy instead of a juicy thesis on Bharat.
