= K. Subrahmanyam =

Indian civil servant (1929–2011)

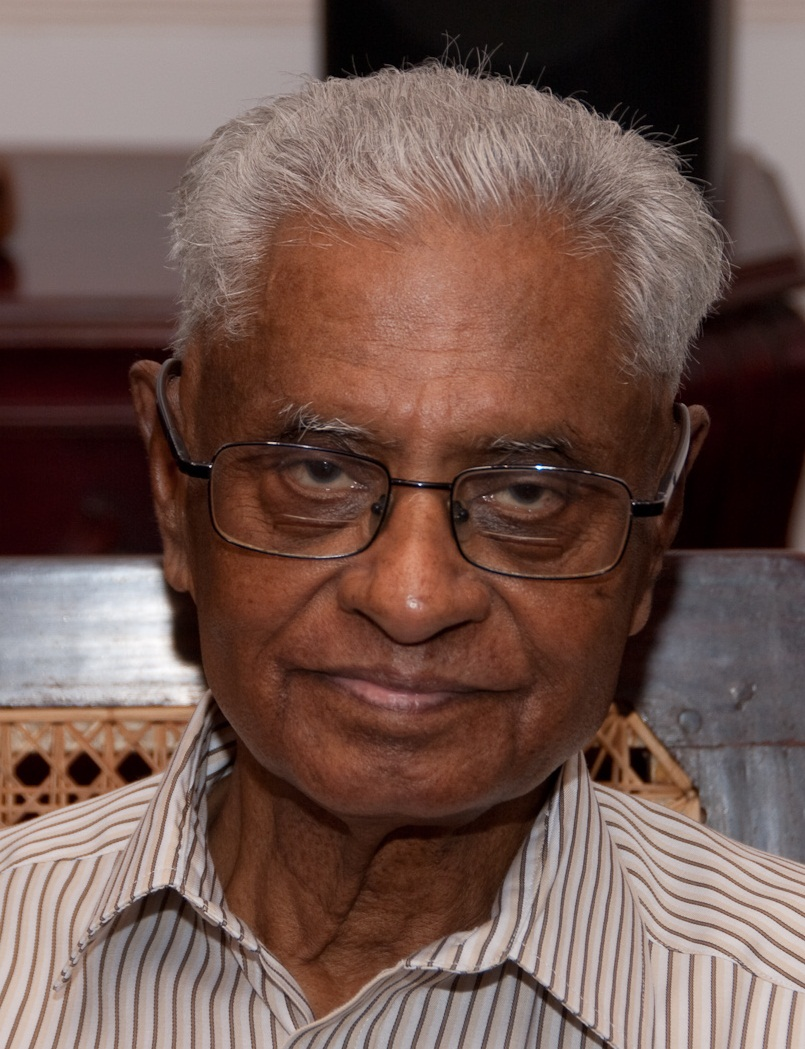
- Subrahmanyam in 2007

Director of Manohar Parrikar Institute for Defense Studies and Analyses
- In office 10 October 1968 – 30 September 1975
- In office 1 April 1980 – 31 July 1987

Personal details
- Born: 19 January 1929 Tiruchirapalli, Madras Presidency, British India
- Died: 2 February 2011 (aged 82) New Delhi, Delhi, India
- Spouse: Sulochana Subrahmanyam
- Children: 4, including Jaishankar and Sanjay
- Education: Presidency College, Chennai; London School of Economics
- Occupation: Journalist; analyst; civil servant

Krishnaswamy Subrahmanyam (19 January 1929 — 2 February 2011) was an Indian international strategic affairs analyst, journalist and former civil servant. Considered a proponent of Realpolitik, Subrahmanyam was an influential voice in Indian security affairs for a long time. He was most often referred to as the doyen of India's strategic affairs community, and as the premier ideological champion of India's nuclear deterrent. His son S Jaishankar was appointed India's External Affairs Minister in 2019.

Subrahmanyam was a key figure in framing and influencing Indian security, nuclear policy and in advocating Indian nuclear positions on the global stage, both as a policy work and as a journalist. He was the second director of the New Delhi–based Institute for Defence Studies and Analyses. He is also noted for having steered several Indian government committees and commissions of inquiry, including the Kargil Review Committee after the Kargil War. Subrahmanyam was a major advocate of the 2007 Indo-US civilian nuclear agreement, adding some heft to the Manmohan Singh government's championing of the deal in the face of much opposition.

He was afflicted by cancer in his final years, and died of a cardiac arrest at the All India Institute of Medical Sciences in 2011, where he had been hospitalised for lung and cardiac problems.

== Early life and education ==
Subrahmanyam was born on 19 January 1929 in a Tamil Brahmin family and grew up in Tiruchirapalli and Madras. Enrolling at Presidency College, he received an MSc in Chemistry from the University of Madras in 1950.

== Career overview ==
=== Civil Services ===
During the final year of his MSc studies at University of Madras, Subrahmanyam appeared for the IAS Exam (Civil Services Exam) held by the UPSC in 1950 and stood first among those who opted for the Indian Administrative Service. He was duly appointed to the Indian Administrative Service in the batch of 1951. He was allotted to the administrative cadre of Madras Presidency and was transferred to the Tamil Nadu cadre when that state was created in 1956. During the course of his career in the civil service, he served in several remote districts of undivided Madras precinct and Tamil Nadu, as well as in various capacities in New Delhi, including as chairman, Joint Intelligence Committee, as Member, Board of Revenue, Government of Tamil Nadu; Home Secretary, Government of Tamil Nadu; as Additional Secretary, Cabinet Secretariat, New Delhi, and as Secretary for Defence Production in the Ministry of Defence.

=== Strategic Analyst ===
In 1965–66, he sought mid-career study leave, and was selected as a Rockefeller fellow in Strategic Studies at the London School of Economics in 1966. On returning to India, he was appointed Director of the newly created Institute for Defence Studies and Analyses (IDSA) in New Delhi, a position he held until 1975. He then went on to hold a number of senior positions in the Government before returning as Director of IDSA in 1980. In 1987, he returned to England as a Visiting Professor and Nehru Fellow at St John's College, Cambridge. Between 1974 and 1986, Subrahmanyam served on a number of UN and other multilateral study groups, on issues such as Indian Ocean affairs, disarmament and nuclear deterrence; he also participated at various Pugwash conferences as a senior member. Subrahmanyam is the author or co-author of fourteen books. These include The Liberation War (1972) with Mohammed Ayoob about the Bangladesh Liberation War, nuclear Myths and Realities (1980), India and the nuclear Challenge (1986), The Second Cold War (1983) and Superpower Rivalry in the Indian Ocean (1989) with Selig S Harrison.

=== Journalism ===
Subrahmanyam was also well known as a frequent commentator and columnist in several Indian and international newspapers. After retiring from government service in the late 1980s, he served as consulting editor and policy expert with various Indian publications. These included The Tribune, The Economic Times and The Times of India. Subrahmanyam was on the editorial board of The Times of India when India conducted the 'Shakti' nuclear tests in 1998 and the largely centrist paper famously withheld his comments, temporarily, while it condemned the weapons tests. Some of his writings in the press have been compiled and published in two volumes.

== Role in Indian nuclear and security policy ==
=== Nuclear doctrine ===
Subrahmanyam was appointed the Convenor of India's first National Security Council Advisory Board (NSCAB), established by the Atal Bihari Vajpayee government in 1998. The board drafted India's Draft nuclear doctrine, which governs all policy aspects with regard to usage and deployment of India's nuclear arsenal. Its most significant aspect was the declared 'No first use' policy, and the consequent directive that India's nuclear weapons would largely be oriented around a second strike capability. Subrahmanyam had been an old proponent of India adopting a no first use posture, arguing for it right after the Shakti tests in 1998, and even earlier in 1974. The nuclear doctrine was adopted by the government of India soon after.

=== Kargil Review Committee and controversy ===
Subrahmanyam was appointed Chairman of the Kargil Review Committee in 1999, an inquiry commission set up by the Indian government to analyse perceived Indian intelligence failures with the Kargil War. The committee's final report (also referred to as the 'Subrahmanyam Report') led to a large-scale restructuring of Indian Intelligence. It, however, came in for heavy criticism in the Indian media for its perceived avoidance of assigning specific responsibility for failures over detecting the Kargil intrusions. The committee was also embroiled in controversy for indicting Brigadier Surinder Singh of the Indian Army for his failure to report enemy intrusions in time, and for his subsequent conduct. Many press reports questioned or contradicted this finding and claimed that Singh had in fact issued early warnings that were ignored by senior Army commanders and, ultimately, higher government functionaries.

In a departure from the norm the final report was published and made publicly available. Some chapters and all annexures, however, were deemed to contain classified information by the government and not released. Subrahmanyam later wrote that the annexures contained information on the development of India's nuclear weapons programme and the roles played by Prime Ministers Rajiv Gandhi, P V Narasimha Rao and V P Singh.

=== Task force on strategic developments ===
In November 2005, Prime Minister Manmohan Singh appointed Subrahmanyam to head a special government task force to study 'Global Strategic Developments' over the next decade. The Task Force examined various aspects of global trends in strategic affairs and submitted its report to the Prime Minister in 2006. The report has not yet been released in the public domain and is presumed to have been categorised a classified document.

== Influence on national security and defence policy ==
Subrahmanyam's pioneering policy work is generally accepted to have left a lasting, even if sometimes controversial, impression on Indian strategic thinking and foreign policy. Its substance is still being debated, even as it is recognised to be firmly located in the pragmatist and realpolitik traditions. Many of his positions, particularly those he articulated on India's nuclear choices, have often led to Subrahmanyam being dubbed a policy 'hawk' and 'hardliner'.

=== Indian Nuclear Programme ===
Subrahmanyam is mostly identified as the premier ideological champion of India's nuclear programme and its exercising of the nuclear weapons option—which began with India's first 'peaceful' Smiling Buddha nuclear test in 1974 and culminated with the 1998 'Shakti' series of weapons tests, both in Pokhran, Rajasthan. His polemics, articulated over five decades, on India's development as a nuclear nation, with civilian and weapons capabilities, have proven both influential and contentious with supporters and detractors alike—of nuclear development and nuclear disarmament. His strong views and trenchant criticism of the inherent inequalities of the global Nuclear Non-Proliferation Treaty and Comprehensive Nuclear Test Ban Treaty regimes are widely known and referenced, as well as being heavily commented on. He often used the term 'nuclear apartheid' to decry this situation and routinely lambasted the five established nuclear states for forcing the Nuclear Non-Proliferation Treaty on everyone else while refusing all proposals for nuclear disarmament, including one proposed by India in 1986. He also coined the phrase 'nuclear ayatollahs' to refer to the western non-proliferation lobby that routinely chided India for pursuing a nuclear programme; and later for finalising an accord on nuclear co-operation with the US in 2007.

The so-called 'Subrahmanyam Formula' was widely used, especially in the mid-1960s and throughout the 1970s, to support India's entry into the nuclear club, despite the country's non-violent Gandhian origins and foreign policy roots in Nehruvian pacifism. The formula did not see any contradiction between striving for socio-economic progress and considering large-scale military development for a developing nation like India. Indeed, strategic deterrence, in which a small but effective indigenous nuclear arsenal would play a key part, was seen as vital to balancing things out in an unequal world carved up by Cold War geopolitics. This ingenious and apparently paradoxical stand has been adversely commented upon, being dubbed 'moral exceptionalism' on non-proliferation by several commentators. Significantly, Subrahmanyam also argued that Pakistan too should look to develop a limited nuclear programme of its own – to establish its own deterrent against conflict. This was met with great suspicion in Pakistani circles, and seen variously as an insult or a challenge. He also concluded in the 90's that India needed only 150-odd warheads to achieve minimum deterrence. And that this had been achieved by 1990, a point noted by many as a good reference to India's nuclear stockpile.

In 1979, as Chairman of India's Joint Intelligence Committee, Subrahmanyam authored a Cabinet note arguing for the resumption of India's nuclear weapons programme. The programme had been shut down in 1977 by Prime Minister Morarji Desai on his assuming office, largely on account of seeking to return to India's pacifist foreign policy roots. Subrahmanyam's note was prompted by Indian Intelligence's latest estimates of progress in China and Pakistan's nuclear programmes. It was discussed and shot down in a Cabinet meeting, principally by Morarji Desai and Atal Bihari Vajpayee, then India's External Affairs Minister. Ironically, Vajpayee would go on to immediately authorise the 'Shakti' series of nuclear weapons tests on becoming Prime Minister in March 1998.

=== 1971 Indo-Pakistani War ===
Subrahmanyam's was an influential voice that argued for India's intervention in solving the serious 1971 crisis in East Pakistan. Early that year, he argued that the growing refugee influx into Eastern India and the mounting humanitarian crisis in the neighbouring country could not be effectively solved without Indian military intervention, mainly because it was precipitated by the Pakistani army's involvement. And that India ignore the crisis only to its own peril. His forthright views attracted controversy – being condemned by the Pakistani government as evidence of Indian aggressiveness; attracting attention and comments in the international media, especially in The Times and Newsweek; and being sharply criticised by even Army Chief Sam Manekshaw, who apparently wanted Subrahmanyam sternly disciplined.

United States Secretary of State Henry Kissinger also condemned these policy positions on a short visit to India in July 1971, particularly when Subrahmanyam told Kissinger that he expected him to be more considerate on account of Kissinger's own experience with genocide, having himself escaped the Holocaust. In spite of these many objections the substance of Subrahmanyam's views swiftly gained ground and led to the Indian government's examination of various military options. These culminated in India's December 1971 war with Pakistan, its victory, and the subsequent creation of Bangladesh.

Later, as head of IDSA, Subrahmanyam was instrumental in helping compile some of the first authoritative reports on the war, in association with some of its key players. He wrote that the 1971 war saw the fledgling IDSA coming into its own as a well-regarded and influential think tank. Quite a bit of his commentary on the messy Cold War politics that shadowed the entire war – which included US moral support to Pakistan, its later dispatch of the USS Enterprise to the Bay of Bengal, and tacit Soviet support to India – along with his related prescriptions for Indian foreign policy found their way into subsequent Indian military doctrine. He has since stated that the major lesson learnt from this war, on the administrative synergy required – where civilian leadership maintains close co-ordination with Intelligence and a pro-active rapport with military brass – has not been adequately enshrined as a guiding tenet of Indian security policy, which tends, in turn, to gravitate towards powerful political and bureaucratic interests.

=== India-United States nuclear agreement ===
In line with his Realpolitik, Subrahmanyam—once a well-known critic of the US for its earlier Cold War-influenced foreign policy, even being dubbed a 'leftist' and 'Soviet sympathiser' on occasion —later on became a leading advocate of the Indo-US Nuclear accord on civilian nuclear co-operation signed by President George W Bush and Prime Minister Manmohan Singh in 2007. He might have also played some formal role in helping the deal along, as press reports indicated. He explained his changed position by stating that there was now tremendous convergence of strategic interest between the two countries, and that India should make use of a great opportunity to work with the US. Many Indian and American commentators have criticised this stand, and also the accord itself.

=== Criticism of government policy ===
Subrahmanyam long argued for revamping India's national security decision-making apparatus, and was also vociferous in his criticism of several governments' efforts at tinkering with the system. He was particularly critical of successive Indian governments' lackadaisical approach to long-term strategic planning, and their similar attitudes to the creation of specialised positions and resources. One noted target of such criticism was his civil service batch mate Brajesh Mishra, who served as both National Security Adviser—when that post was created—and Principal Secretary to Prime Minister Atal Bihari Vajpayee from 1998 to 2004. Subrahmanyam repeatedly called for bifurcating both key posts, in commentary sometimes so strong that it even appeared to precipitate a public spat between the two. This bifurcation of posts was finally done by Prime Minister Manmohan Singh, in consultation with Subrahmanyam, upon assuming office in 2004. However, as mentioned in a book by Sanjaya Baru, it seems that in later years, Subrahmanyam considered that the bifurcation of posts was a correct measure, as both posts are crucial and carried heavy responsibilities. The establishment of a National Defence University by the government is also something he long demanded. Despite several recommendations, including those from a government committee Subrahmanyam himself chaired, this is yet to be set up.

Subrahmanyam was critical of Gujarat riots. He said: "Dharma was killed in Gujarat (2002 Riots). Those who failed to protect innocent citizens are guilty of adharma. Rama...would have used his bow against the 'Asura' rulers of Gujarat."

== Honours and awards ==
Subrahmanyam declined the Indian government honour of a Padma Bhushan in 1999, stating that bureaucrats and journalists should not accept government awards. A festschrift in honour of Subrahmanyam, with essays by Indian and American policy experts, academics and journalists, was published in 2004 to mark his 75th birthday. Always an influential Indian media figure, he was featured in India Today magazine's 'High & Mighty' listing in 2006. The IDSA instituted an annual 'K Subrahmanyam Award' for contributions to Strategic Affairs in 2007 and held a memorial lecture in 2021. On 11 November 2005, speaking on the 40th anniversary of IDSA's founding, Prime Minister Manmohan Singh singled out Subrahmanyam for his achievements, saying:

Subrahmanyam's incisive writings continue to stimulate and contribute to the thinking of strategic analysis and policy makers in this vital area of national concern. We look forward to many more years of active contribution from this doyen of the strategic community in India.

== Personal life ==
At an early age, he was married to Sulochana, a lady of his own community and similar family background, in a match arranged by their parents. They had three sons; IAS officer S. Vijay Kumar, Indian diplomat and Foreign Minister (from 2019) S. Jaishankar, historian Sanjay Subrahmanyam, and a daughter, Sudha Subrahmanyam.

Subrahmanyam was on board the Indian Airlines Flight 421 on 24 August 1984 when the plane was hijacked to Lahore, Pakistan and onward to Dubai where all passengers were released without incident. Interestingly, the arrested hijackers later claimed in court that it was Subrahmanyam who "planned the entire hijacking to examine nuclear installations in Pakistan."

== See also ==
- International relations
- Nuclear power in India
- S. Jaishankar
- Sanjay Subrahmanyam
