= 8 South Audley Street, Mayfair =

8 South Audley Street
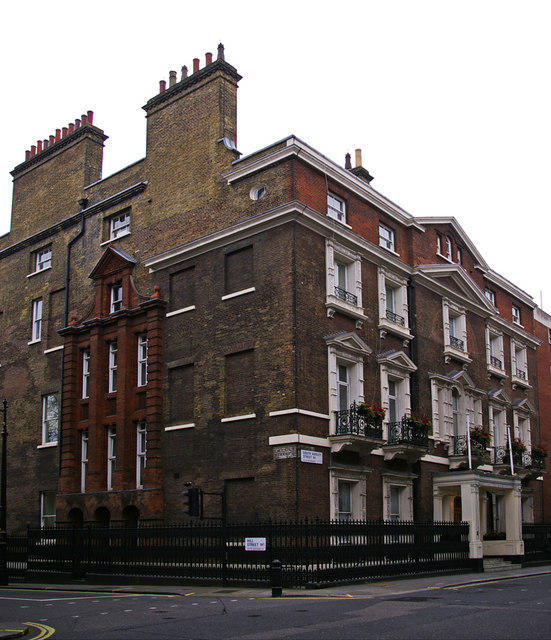
- Corner of South Audley Street and Hill Street, Mayfair
- Former names: Cambridge House, Curzon House, and Alington House

General information
- Architectural style: Georgian
- Location: 8 South Audley Street, Mayfair, London W1, City of Westminster, London, England
- Construction started: 1744

Technical details
- Material: Brown brick with stucco dressings
- Floor count: 4 (plus basement)

8 South Audley Street Mayfair is a Grade II Listed building in Mayfair, London which was constructed in 1744 and significantly altered in the early and mid-19th century.

The building currently houses the Nehru Centre, London, and has previously has served as an aristocratic Townhouse and as a Royal Residence. At various times in the building's history it has been known as Alington House, Cambridge House, and Curzon House.

== Design and construction ==
No. 8 South Audley Street is a four-storey Georgian corner townhouse of brown brick with stucco dressings, articulated by a boldly projecting nineteenth-century Ionic-pilastered porch, a sequence of pedimented first-floor windows (with a central Venetian light), foliated architraves to the upper storeys, cast-iron balconettes and guards, and a full-height three-window bow to the rear; internally it retains an eighteenth-century stone stair with wrought-iron balustrade alongside later neoclassical and fuller mid-nineteenth-century work. Although the original architect is not recorded, an early nineteenth-century ground-floor plan signed “C. Beazley Archt, March 1804” shows Charles Beazley's involvement in alterations when the house was known as Alington House, establishing a documented architectural hand on the building's fabric.

== History and occupants ==
=== 18th Century ===
Following the building's construction in 1744 the property was occupied by the City merchant James Lumley, who brought with him an elaborate chimneypiece attributed to Isaac Ware. Soon after it was acquired as the London residence of the Archbishops of York..

=== Royal residence ===
8 South Audley Street was reportedly used as the London residence of Queen Caroline during the final year of her life. The next recorded residents were her brother-in-law Prince Adolphus, Duke of Cambridge and his family. During the years which the Duke and Duchess of Cambridge leased No. 8 the building was known as Cambridge House. During this period Prince Adolphus was frequently abroad in his capacity as Viceroy of Hanover, and in 1826 the House was recorded as the London residence of the Duke of Cambridge's elder brother Prince Frederick, Duke of York and Albany.

The Duke of Cambridge gave up the house in 1830, and instead leased a larger House at No. 94 Piccadilly, which has since retained the name Cambridge House.

=== 1840s to 1870s: Curzon House ===
By 1844 the house was known as Curzon House, and it was the London residence of Richard Curzon-Howe, 1st Earl Howe. Lord Howe's daughter Adelaide, Lady Burghersh gave birth to her first child at the House on 3 September 1858. Howe died in 1870, and in June 1876 his Executors directed the estate agents Messrs. Driver to sell the leasehold of 8 South Audley Street, which they noted included a remaining term of more than 60 years.

=== 1880s to 1920s: Alington House ===
By 1883 No. 8 South Audley Street was the home of Henry Sturt, 1st Baron Alington, and the building became known as Alington House. Lord Alington was reportedly on friendly terms with various members of the British Royal Family, and in the early 20th century the House maintained some minor repute as the site of a large Ball which Lord Alington hosted, at which there were reportedly sixteen members of the Royal Family were in attendance.

In May 1896 the leasehold of 8 South Audley Street was advertised as being for sale by Lord Alington; the particulars of the advertisements noted that the remaining term of the leasehold was nearly 40 years.

In 1899 the House was leased by Charles Spencer-Churchill, 9th Duke of Marlborough and his wife Consuelo, Duchess of Marlborough.

Following Lord Alington's death in 1904, details of his estate reported in contemporary newspaper articles in September of the same year revealed that he was not as wealthy as he had been rumoured to be during his life, and that consequently his son Humphrey Sturt, 2nd Baron Alington intended to dispose of Alington House immediately. The house was then purchased by William Denison, 2nd Earl of Londesborough, who lived at the property with his wife and daughter Lady Irene Denison (later Marchioness of Carisbrooke) during the early years of the 1900s. By 1905 Lord and Lady Londesborough were undertaking substantial renovations to the House.

In 1909 newspapers reported that Sir Berkeley Sheffield purchased the house from Lord Londesborough; however the memoirs of the Earl of Crawford note that the House had been leased to Sir Berkeley for a London Season for a rent of £630.

==== First World War ====
The house was used as the "Russian Hospital for British Officers" during the First World War.

==== Final years as a private house ====
An auction of the "valuable contents of the mansion" was held on 24 July 1922 at the direction of Sir Berkeley Sheffield. By the end of 1922 the Sheffield family had vacated the property, and acquired a new London residence at No. 16 Kensington Palace Gardens.

In 1927 the House was rented by Gerald Liddell, 6th Baron Ravensworth, where he and his wife hosted a debutante coming-out ball for their daughters in May.

The freehold of the mansion was advertised as being for sale in October 1929.

==== Clubhouse ====
On 1 May 1930 the Bachelors' Club officially opened its new premises at No. 8 South Audley Street.

==== Second World War ====
The house sustained bomb damage during the Second World War, and was used as the American Officers' Mess during the later years of the War.

=== Recent history ===
Following the end of the Second World War the building was leased by the Government of India. The house was advertised as being for sale in September 1946, for a rumoured price of £120,000. In 1949 the freehold of 8 South Audley Street was purchased by an insurance company as an investment; the price paid was reportedly £150,000. By 1950 No. 8 South Audley Street had become the premises of the Indian Services Club. The House was also used for entertaining by the High Commissioner for India during the early 1950s.

== Architecture and interior ==
Auction and sale notices record a formal ground- and first-floor plan centred on an entrance hall, inner hall, and principal stair leading to a reception suite, with extensive family accommodation and service rooms behind. In 1876, particulars listed a suite of reception rooms, eighteen bed- and dressing-rooms, ample domestic offices, and—within the same holding—an ancillary Hill Street cottage and extensive stabling and coach-house premises.

By 1896 (Alington House), the first-floor entertaining suite comprised a ballroom (about 35×29 ft), drawing room (c. 36×21 ft), a long conservatory (nearly 50 ft) opening to a winter garden, a boudoir, and two further large sitting rooms. The ground floor around the stair hall contained a state dining room (c. 35×24 ft), smaller dining room (c. 22×16 ft) with service connection to the basement, a library (c. 36×21 ft) opening to the garden, and a morning room of roughly 20 ft square. Bedrooms included three principal rooms (about 25×24 ft, 25×21 ft, and ~19 ft in width/depth as stated) with large dressing rooms, plus roughly 15 additional bedrooms, and separate male-servant rooms in the basement. The domestic offices were described as ample, light, and well arranged. Associated South Street stables provided 10 stalls, carriage space for five vehicles, with lofts and living rooms over.

In 1929, the freehold sale notice quantified the interior as a suite of six reception rooms, 25 bedrooms, five bathrooms, and the usual service offices, the whole stated at about 17,210 sq ft.

In 1946, after modernisation, particulars recorded panelled reception rooms, about 25 bed- and dressing-rooms, and a two-galleried squash racquets court within the house, with decorative work attributed to the Adam brothers.
