= Ashok Kantha =

Indian diplomat

Former Indian Ambassador to China
- In office 6 January 2014 – January 2016
- Preceded by: Subrahmanyam Jaishankar
- Succeeded by: Vijay Keshav Gokhale

Indian High Commissioner to Sri Lanka
- In office 2009–13
- Succeeded by: Yashvardhan Kumar Sinha

Indian High Commissioner to Malaysia
- In office 2007–2009

Personal details
- Born: 14 May 1955 (age 71)
- Occupation: Career Diplomat

Ashok Kantha or Ashok K. Kantha is an Indian diplomat and was formerly the Indian Ambassador to the China. He is a 1977 batch Indian Foreign Service officer. He had previously served as Secretary to the Ministry of External Affairs Government of India (2013–2014), High Commissioner of India in Sri Lanka (2009–2013) and as India's High Commissioner to Malaysia (2007–2009). He is currently the Subhas Chandra Bose Chair Professor of International Relations at Chanakya University, Bengaluru.

== Early life and background ==
Kantha was born on 14 May 1955. After graduating in history from Patna University in 1975, he briefly worked as an executive with the State Bank of India. He joined the Indian Foreign Service in July 1977 and studied Chinese Language at Nanyang University, Singapore.
