= Leonard Weinberg =

American lawyer

Leonard Weinberg was born in Baltimore, Maryland on December 30, 1889. He was the founder of the large law firm in Downtown Baltimore, Weinberg and Green (originally named Weinberg and Sweeten). He was once a resident of the Reservoir Hill Community near Druid Hill Park in Baltimore and former Special States Attorney for Baltimore City.

== Early life and career ==
Weinberg was a self-taught stenographer at the age of 15. He left school (Baltimore City College High School) to take a job as a typist for an uncle who was a court reporter. He was known as one of the youngest members of that profession. By the time Weinberg was 18, he had begun his own court reporting business. For the next 12 years, Weinberg worked as the official court reporter to the Supreme Bench of Baltimore City. He was also in the pool of stenographer at the Democratic National Convention in Baltimore when President Woodrow Wilson was nominated.

== Later career ==
Weinberg's public service career spanned over 70 years. Weinberg graduated from the University of Maryland School of law in 1919. After graduation, he co-founded Weinberg and Sweeten (later changing its name to Weinberg and Green). Philanthropy, Zanvyl Krieger was amongst the names of lawyers who practice at the firm. It was the first large law firm in the state of Maryland to include both Jewish and Christian partners. In the 1930s he filed one of the earliest damages lawsuits against a labor union; he was a delegate to the 1932 Democratic National Convention held in Chicago in support of Governor Albert Ritchie of Maryland nomination. In 1936 he successfully argued to the Supreme Court on behalf of Harry Marks Clothing Company in the case upholding the constitutionality of the National Labor Relation Act. Also on Weinberg's list of public duties includes: radio personality to acquaint the public with recent changes in law; former president of the Baltimore Hebrew Congregation and Phoenix Club; and member of the board at Old Phoenix Hospital (now named Sinai Hospital).

Leonard Weinberg died on May 15, 1974.
