= Kenneth Macpherson (politician) =

Planter and politician in Jamaica

Kenneth Macpherson or McPherson (died after 1823) was a planter and slave-owner in Jamaica. He was elected to the House of Assembly of Jamaica in 1820.
