= Vijay Keshav Gokhale =

Indian diplomat

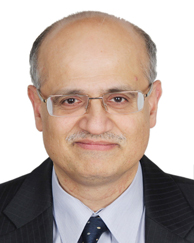

32nd Foreign Secretary of India
- In office 29 January 2018 – 28 January 2020
- Prime Minister: Narendra Modi
- Minister: Sushma Swaraj; Subrahmanyam Jaishankar
- Preceded by: Subrahmanyam Jaishankar
- Succeeded by: Harsh Vardhan Shringla

Secretary (Economic Relations) in the Ministry of External Affairs
- In office 21 October 2017 – 29 January 2018
- Preceded by: Amar Sinha
- Succeeded by: T. S. Tirumurti

Indian Ambassador to China
- In office 20 January 2016 – 21 October 2017
- Preceded by: Ashok Kantha
- Succeeded by: Gautam Bambawale

Indian Ambassador to Germany
- In office 1 October 2013 – 20 January 2016
- Preceded by: Sujatha Singh
- Succeeded by: Gurjit Singh

Personal details
- Born: 24 January 1959 (age 67)
- Education: St. Stephen's College, University of Delhi
- Occupation: IFS
- Profession: Civil Servant; Diplomat

Vijay Keshav Gokhale IFS, (born 24 January 1959), is a retired Indian diplomat and the 32nd Foreign Secretary of India. Gokhale previously served as the Ambassador of India to China.

== Early life and education ==
Gokhale hails from Pune, Maharashtra. He studied at St. Columba's School, Delhi. He then attended St. Stephen's College, Delhi, and completed his M.A. degree in history from the University of Delhi. He joined the Indian Foreign Service in 1981.

Gokhale is fluent in Marathi, Hindi, English, Sanskrit, and Mandarin Chinese. He is married to Vandana Gokhale, and they have a son, Jayant Gokhale.

== Career ==
Gokhale is an Indian Foreign Service officer of the 1981 batch. He served in Indian diplomatic missions in Hong Kong, Hanoi, Beijing and New York. He served as the Deputy Secretary (Finance), Director (China and East Asia) and Joint Secretary (East Asia) at the Ministry of External Affairs, India.

Gokhale was the High Commissioner of India to Malaysia from January 2010 to October 2013 and the Indian Ambassador to Germany from October 2013 to January 2016. He was the Indian Ambassador to China from 20 January 2016 to 21 October 2017. He is currently a Non-Resident Senior Fellow at the New Delhi-based think tank, Carnegie India. Gokhale is one of India's most reputed and well-versed sinologists.

== Expertise ==
Vijay Gokhale is considered as an expert on Chinese affairs. He has the rare distinction of being the only Indian Foreign Service officer to have served in both mainland China and Taiwan. He was the Director General of the India-Taipei Association, Taiwan. Gokhale during his tenure as the Ambassador of India to China, played a key role in resolving the 2017 Doklam crisis between both the nations. Statements and actions since the beginning of his tenure indicate that he will push a moderate or dovish position on relations with China. In June 2020 Gokhale stated that China is not seeking a New World Order.

== Publications ==
In 2021 he published a research paper titled "The Road from Galwan" examining different factors influencing the Galwan Valley clash between India and China in Eastern Ladakh, along the Line of Actual Control, and the way forward for the two Himalayan neighbors. Gokhale announced his very first book titled "Tiananmen Square - The Making of a Protest" which is an eye-witness account of the 1989 brutal military crackdown in China and its aftermath from an Indian perspective.

- Tiananmen Square: The Making of a Protest. Harper Collins, May 2021. ISBN 9789354225369
- The Long Game: How the Chinese Negotiate with India. Penguin Random House. July 2021. ISBN 9789354921216

== See also ==
- Harsh V Shringla
- Dr. S Jaishankar
- Syed Akbaruddin
- Narendra Modi

Diplomatic posts
Preceded by S. Jaishankar	Foreign Secretary of India; 2018–2020	Succeeded by Harsh Vardhan Shringla
