= Democracy and Security =

- Discipline: Political science
- Language: English
- Edited by: Arie Perliger

Publication details
- History: 2005–present
- Publisher: Routledge
- Frequency: Quarterly

Standard abbreviations
- ISO 4: Democr. Secur.

Indexing
- ISSN: 1741-9166 (print); 1555-5860 (web)

Links
- Journal homepage; Online access; Online archive

Democracy and Security is a peer-reviewed academic journal covering national security and democracy published by Routledge. Founded in 2005, editors Leonard Weinberg and Gabriel Ben Dor wrote that the journal covers issues about democracies responding to threats.
