= T. C. A. Raghavan =

Indian diplomat and author

High Commissioner of India to Pakistan
- In office June 2013 – December 2015
- President: Pranab Mukherjee
- Preceded by: Sharat Sabharwal
- Succeeded by: Gautam Bambawale

Personal details
- Born: 16 December 1955 (age 70)
- Education: St Stephen's College, Jawaharlal Nehru University

TCA Raghavan is a former Indian diplomat who was a 1982 batch officer of the Indian Foreign Service. He has considerable experience in South Asia policy issues and considered an expert on Pakistan studies, including heading the Joint Secretary the Division of the Ministry of External Affairs in Pakistan Afghanistan and Iran (PAI) division. From 6 June 2013 till his retirement on 31 December 2015 Raghavan was the High Commissioner of India to Pakistan. After retirement he has authored two books- the first a biography of two Mughal nobles and the other a study of India Pakistan relations. In July 2018 he was appointed Director General of the Indian Council of World Affairs.

== Early life and background ==
Raghavan spent his childhood in Delhi, Bhopal and Jammu. He finished school at Sardar Patel Vidyalaya and his college and university were at St. Stephen's College, Delhi University and Jawaharlal Nehru University, New Delhi. He joined the Indian Foreign Service in 1982. He was awarded a PhD by Jawaharlal Nehru University in 1992 in history. His dissertation was on the Agrarian History of the Narmada Valley.

== Career ==
Raghavan was the Indian high commissioner to Singapore till June 2013. After that, he was appointed the High commissioner to Pakistan. Earlier, Raghavan was a Deputy High Commissioner in Islamabad from 2003 to 2007. His previous overseas postings include United Kingdom (1995-1998), Bhutan (1992-1995) and Kuwait (1983-1986).

After his retirement he has emerged as a well known author with three well received books. The first is entitled Attendant Lords: Bairam Khan and Abdur Rahim, Courtiers and Poets in Mughal India. It was published by HarperCollins in 2017 and was awarded the Mohammad Habib Prize for medieval Indian history by the Indian History Congress in December 2017. His second book is also published by HarperCollins and is entitled The People Next Door: The Curious History of India's Relations with Pakistan. His latest book is entitled History Men: Jadunath Sarkar, G S Sardesai, Raghubir Sinh and their Quest for India's Past (HarperCollins, 2020).

== Personal life ==
Raghavan is married to Ranjana Raghavan. They have two daughters.

== Bibliography ==
- Raghavan, T. C. A. (2017). The People Next Door: The Curious History of India-Pakistan Relations. HarperCollins. ISBN 9789352770915.
- Raghavan, T. C. A. (2017). Attendant Lords: Bairam Khan and Abdur Rahim : Courtiers & Poets in Mughal India. HarperCollins Publishers India. ISBN 978-93-5264-301-1.

Diplomatic posts
Preceded by Subrahmanyam Jaishankar	High Commissioner of India to Singapore; 2009–2013	Succeeded by Vijay Thakur Singh
Preceded by Sharat Sabharwal	High Commissioner of India to Pakistan; June 2013 – December 2015	Succeeded by Gautam Bambawale
