= Nehru Centre, London =

Cultural centre in the UK

Coordinates: 51.5077°N 0.1507°W

The Nehru Centre, London is a cultural centre located at 8 South Audley Street, Mayfair, London. Its goal is to promote cultural exchange between India and the United Kingdom. It is named after Jawaharlal Nehru.

The Nehru Centre was founded in 1992. Since its inception it has striven to facilitate and deepen cultural dialogue between India and UK by encouraging visits of prominent Indian artists to UK and prominent artists from UK to India.

The Nehru Centre is headed by a director, who is also a ranking diplomat at the High Commission of India, London. Many illustrious Indians have headed the Nehru Centre as directors. Gopalkrishna Gandhi was its first director. Indian playwright Girish Karnad, writer-diplomat Pavan Varma once headed the Nehru Centre, London as directors. Poet-diplomat Abhay K has d been appointed as the director of the Nehru Centre. From October 2019, bestselling award-winning author, Amish Tripathi, has taken over as Director. Amish has been ranked among the top 100 celebrities in India by Forbes magazine consistently, and has also been ranked among the most powerful Indians by India Today magazine in 2019.

It is regarded as a flagship cultural centre of the Indian Council for Cultural Relations (ICCR) abroad.

== Directors ==
- Gopalkrishna Gandhi (1992–1997)
- I.N. Chaudhary (1997–1999)
- Girish Karnad (2000–2003)
- Pavan Varma (2004–2005)
- Atul Khare (2005–2006)
- Monika Kapil Mohta (2006–2011)
- Sangeeta Bahadur (2011–2015)
- Srinivas Gotru (2015-2019)
- Amish Tripathi (2019-2023)
