= Satyabrata Pal =

Indian civil servant

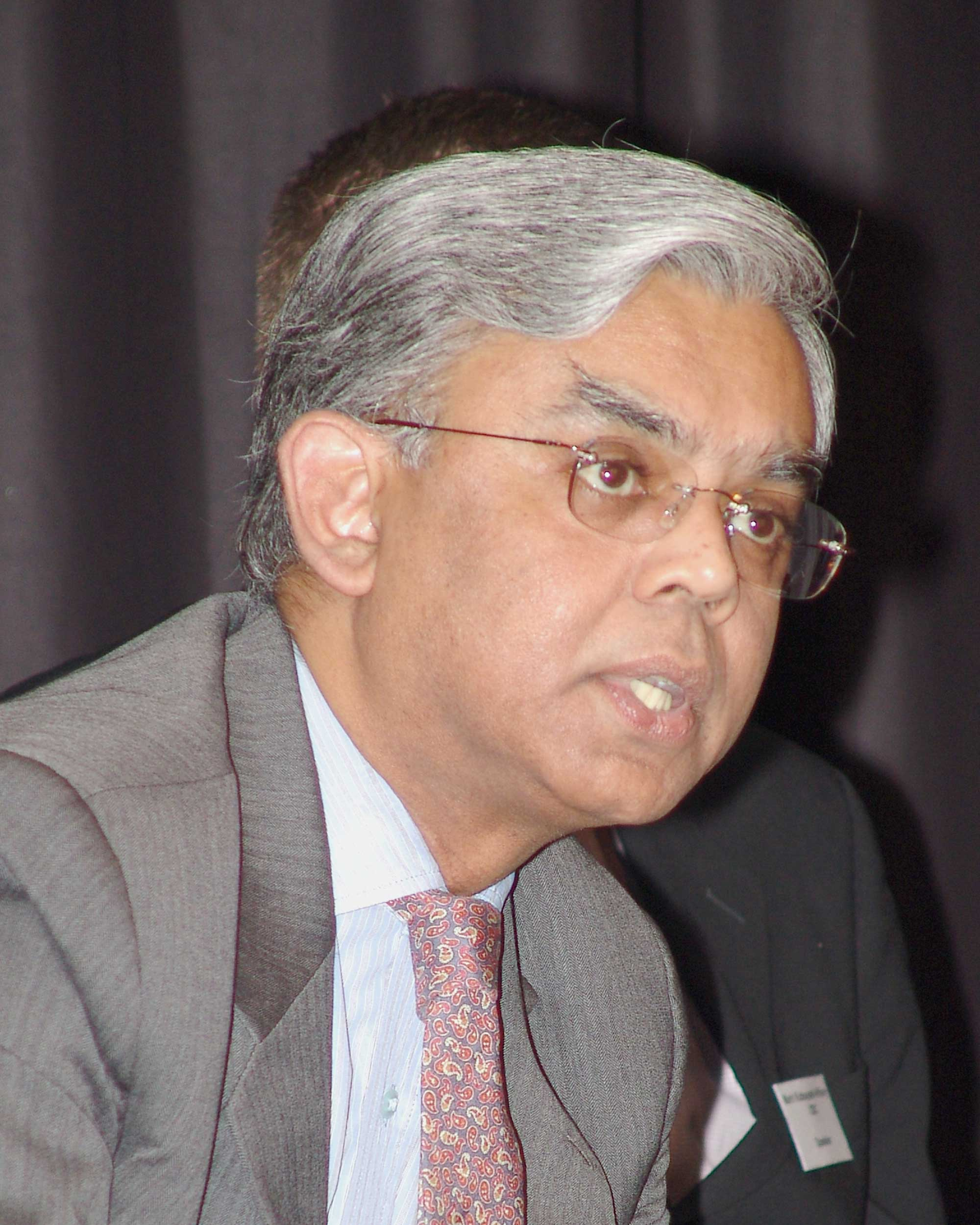

Indian ambassador to Pakistan
- In office 2006–2009
- Preceded by: Shivshankar Menon
- Succeeded by: Sharat Sabharwal

Personal details
- Died: September 24, 2019
- Relations: Radhabinod Pal (grandfather)
- Occupation: Civil servant IFS

Satyabrata Pal was an Indian Civil servant and was the Indian ambassador to Pakistan.

Ambassador Pal died on 24 September 2019.

== Positions held ==
- Member National Human Rights Commission (NHRC).
- Ambassador to South Africa.
- 1972 batch officer of the Indian Foreign Service.
