= S. Jaishankar =

Indian diplomat and politician (born 1955)

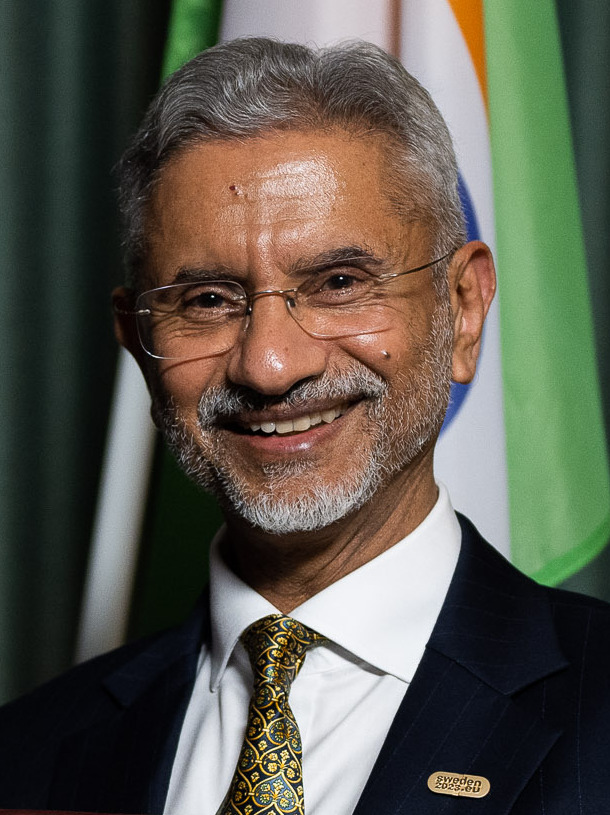
- Official portrait, 2023

Union Minister of External Affairs
- Incumbent
- Assumed office 30 May 2019
- President: Ramnath Kovind; Droupadi Murmu
- Prime Minister: Narendra Modi
- Preceded by: Sushma Swaraj

Member of Parliament, Rajya Sabha
- Incumbent
- Assumed office 6 July 2019
- Preceded by: Amit Shah
- Constituency: Gujarat

Foreign Secretary of India
- In office 28 January 2015 – 28 January 2018
- Minister: Sushma Swaraj
- Preceded by: Sujatha Singh
- Succeeded by: Vijay Keshav Gokhale

Ambassador of India to the United States
- In office 1 December 2013 – 28 January 2015
- President: Pranab Mukherjee
- Preceded by: Nirupama Rao
- Succeeded by: Arun Kumar Singh

Ambassador of India to China
- In office 1 June 2009 – 1 December 2013
- President: Pratibha Patil; Pranab Mukherjee
- Prime Minister: Manmohan Singh
- Preceded by: Nirupama Rao
- Succeeded by: Ashok Kantha

High Commissioner of India to Singapore
- In office 1 January 2007 – 1 June 2009
- President: A.P.J. Abdul Kalam; Pratibha Patil
- Preceded by: Alok Prasad
- Succeeded by: TCA Raghavan

Ambassador of India to the Czech Republic
- In office 1 January 2001 – 1 January 2004
- President: K. R. Narayanan; A.P.J. Abdul Kalam
- Preceded by: Girish Dhume
- Succeeded by: P. S. Raghavan

Personal details
- Born: Subrahmanyam Jaishankar; 9 January 1955 (age 71) New Delhi, Delhi, India
- Party: Bharatiya Janata Party
- Spouses: Shobha Jaishankar (died); Kyoko Somekawa (m. 1998)
- Children: 3
- Parent: K. Subrahmanyam (father)
- Relatives: Sanjay Subrahmanyam (brother)
- Education: Delhi University (BSc); Jawaharlal Nehru University (MA, MPhil, PhD)
- Occupation: Civil servant; diplomat; politician; author
- Awards: Padma Shri (2019)

Subrahmanyam Jaishankar (born 9 January 1955) is an Indian politician and retired diplomat who currently serves as the Minister of External Affairs of India since 2019. He is the longest-serving minister for external affairs to hold the portfolio exclusively. (Note: The first Indian prime minister Jawaharlal Nehru held the portfolio of external affairs additionally.) A member of the Bharatiya Janata Party (BJP), he is a member of parliament in the Rajya Sabha, the upper house of the Indian parliament. He previously served as the foreign secretary of India from 2015 to 2018. In January 2019, he was conferred with the Padma Shri, India's fourth-highest civilian honour.

Jaishankar was born in 1955 in Delhi, in a Tamil Hindu family. He did his schooling in Delhi, and Bengaluru, and completed his bachelor's degree in chemistry from St Stephen's College, Delhi. He obtained his master's degree in political science and an M.Phil. and PhD in international relations from Jawaharlal Nehru University.

Jaishankar joined the Indian Foreign Service in 1977, and during a diplomatic career spanning over 38 years, served in different capacities in India and abroad. He served as an ambassador to the Czech Republic (2001–2004), high commissioner to Singapore (2007–2009), ambassador to China (2009–2013), and the United States (2014–2015). From 2004 to 2007, he was the joint secretary (Americas) at the ministry of external affairs, and was one of the officials involved in the negotiation of the India–United States Civil Nuclear Agreement. After serving as the foreign secretary, he retired in 2018.

On retirement, Jaishankar served as president of global corporate affairs with the Tata Group briefly from 2018 to early 2019. In May 2019, he was sworn in as a cabinet minister in the second Modi ministry. He is first former foreign secretary of India to head the ministry of external affairs as cabinet minister. In June 2024, he was re-appointed to the post in the third Modi ministry after the BJP-led coalition won the 2024 Indian general elections. Jaishankar has crafted the assertive foreign policy with India-first. He emphasises national interest, strategic autonomy, freedom of choice and multi-vector diplomacy.

== Early life and education ==
Jaishankar was born on 9 January 1955 in Delhi, India, to a prominent Indian civil servant Krishnaswamy Subrahmanyam and Sulochana Subrahmanyam. He was brought up in a Tamil Hindu family. He has a sister, Sudha Subrahmanyam, and two brothers: historian Sanjay Subrahmanyam and IAS officer S. Vijay Kumar, former rural development secretary of India.

Jaishankar did his schooling at The Air Force School, Delhi, and at the Bangalore Military School, Bangalore. He then did his bachelor's degree in chemistry from St. Stephen's College, Delhi. He has an MA in political science and an M.Phil. and PhD in international relations from Jawaharlal Nehru University (JNU), where he specialised in nuclear diplomacy.

== Diplomatic career (1979–2018) ==
After joining the IFS in 1977, Jaishankar served as third secretary and second secretary in the Indian mission to the Soviet Union in Moscow from 1979 to 1981. He returned to New Delhi, where he worked as a special assistant to diplomat Gopalaswami Parthasarathy and as undersecretary in the Americas division of India's ministry of external affairs, dealing with United States. He was part of the team that resolved the dispute over the supply of US nuclear fuel to the Tarapur Power Station in India. From 1985 to 1988, he was the first secretary at the Indian embassy in Washington, D.C.

From 1988 to 1990, he served in Sri Lanka as first secretary and political adviser to the Indian Peacekeeping Force (IPKF). From 1990 to 1993, he was counsellor (commercial) at the Indian mission in Budapest. Returning to New Delhi, he served as director (East Europe) in the ministry of external affairs and as press secretary and speechwriter for Shankar Dayal Sharma, then president of India.

Jaishankar was then deputy chief of mission at the Indian embassy in Tokyo from 1996 to 2000. This period saw a downturn in India–Japan relations following India's Pokhran-II nuclear tests as well as a recovery after a visit to India by then Japanese prime minister Yoshiro Mori. Jaishankar is reported to have helped introduce future Japanese prime minister Shinzō Abe to Manmohan Singh. In 2000, he was appointed India's ambassador to the Czech Republic.

From 2004 to 2007, Jaishankar was joint secretary (Americas) at the ministry of external affairs in New Delhi. In this capacity, he was involved in negotiating the India–United States Civil Nuclear Agreement and improving defence cooperation, including during relief operations following the 2004 Indian Ocean tsunami. Jaishankar was also involved with the conclusion of the 2005 New Defense Framework and the Open Skies Agreement, and he was associated with the launch of the India–United States Energy Dialogue, the India-United States Economic Dialogue, and the India-United States CEO's Forum. In 2006–2007, Jaishankar led the Indian team during the negotiations on the 123 Agreement with the United States. He also represented the Indian government at the Carnegie Endowment International Non-proliferation Conference in June 2007.

Jaishankar was one of those considered for the post of India's foreign secretary in 2013 but lost out to Sujatha Singh, who became the third woman to serve in the post.

=== High Commissioner to Singapore ===
From 2007 to 2009, Jaishankar served as India's high commissioner to Singapore. During his tenure, he helped implement the Comprehensive Economic Cooperation Agreement (CECA) that expanded India's business presence in Singapore, and oversaw a defence arrangement by which Singapore keeps some of its military equipment in India on a permanent basis. Jaishankar also promoted the Pravasi Bharatiya Divas, and IIMPact in Singapore.

=== Ambassador to China ===
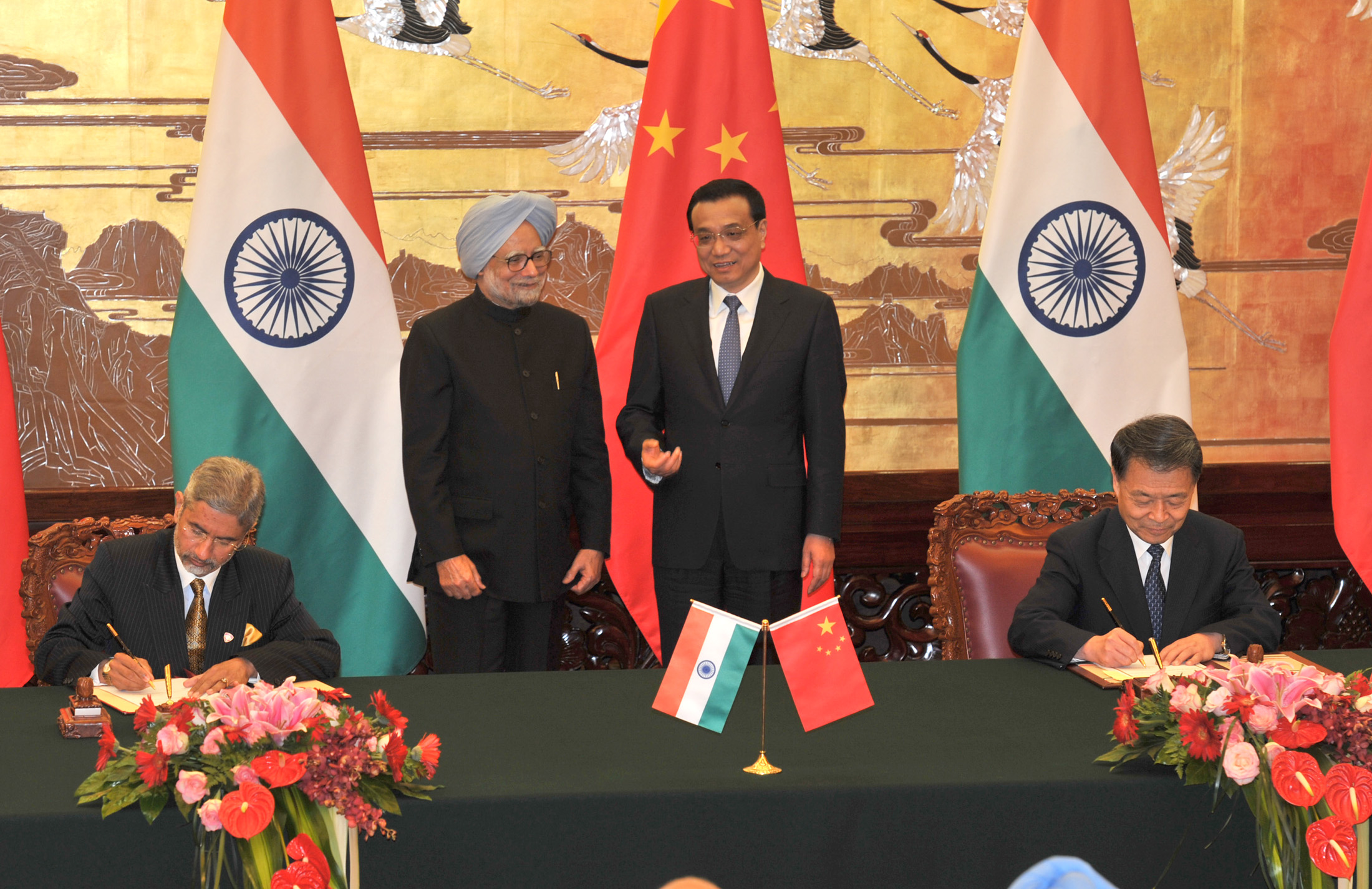
Jaishankar (left) while serving as Indian ambassador to China in 2013, during prime minister Manmohan Singh's visit to China

Jaishankar was India's longest-serving ambassador to China, with a four-and-a-half-year term. In Beijing, Jaishankar was involved in improving economic, trade and cultural relations between China and India, and in managing the Sino-Indian border dispute.

Jaishankar's tenure as India's ambassador to China coincided with several major developments in relations between the two countries. His 2010 briefing to the Indian cabinet committee on security regarding China's refusal to issue a visa to the head of the Indian Army's Northern Command led to a suspension of Indian defence co-operation with China, before the situation was resolved in April 2011. Also in 2010, Jaishankar negotiated an end to the Chinese policy of issuing stapled visas to Indians from Jammu and Kashmir. In 2012, in response to Chinese passports showing Arunachal Pradesh and Aksai Chin as parts of China, he ordered visas issued to Chinese nationals showing those territories as parts of India. In May 2013, he negotiated the end of a stand-off resulting from the encampment by China's People's Liberation Army on Ladakh's Depsang Plains, threatening to cancel Premier Li Keqiang's scheduled visit to India if Chinese forces did not withdraw.

Jaishankar advocated deeper Indian cooperation with China as long as India's "core interests" were respected, and argued for better market access for Indian businesses operating in China on the grounds that more balanced trade was necessary for the bilateral economic relationship to be sustainable. He was also involved in improving people-to-people contacts between India and China, promoting events that showcased Indian culture in 30 Chinese cities.

=== Ambassador to the United States ===
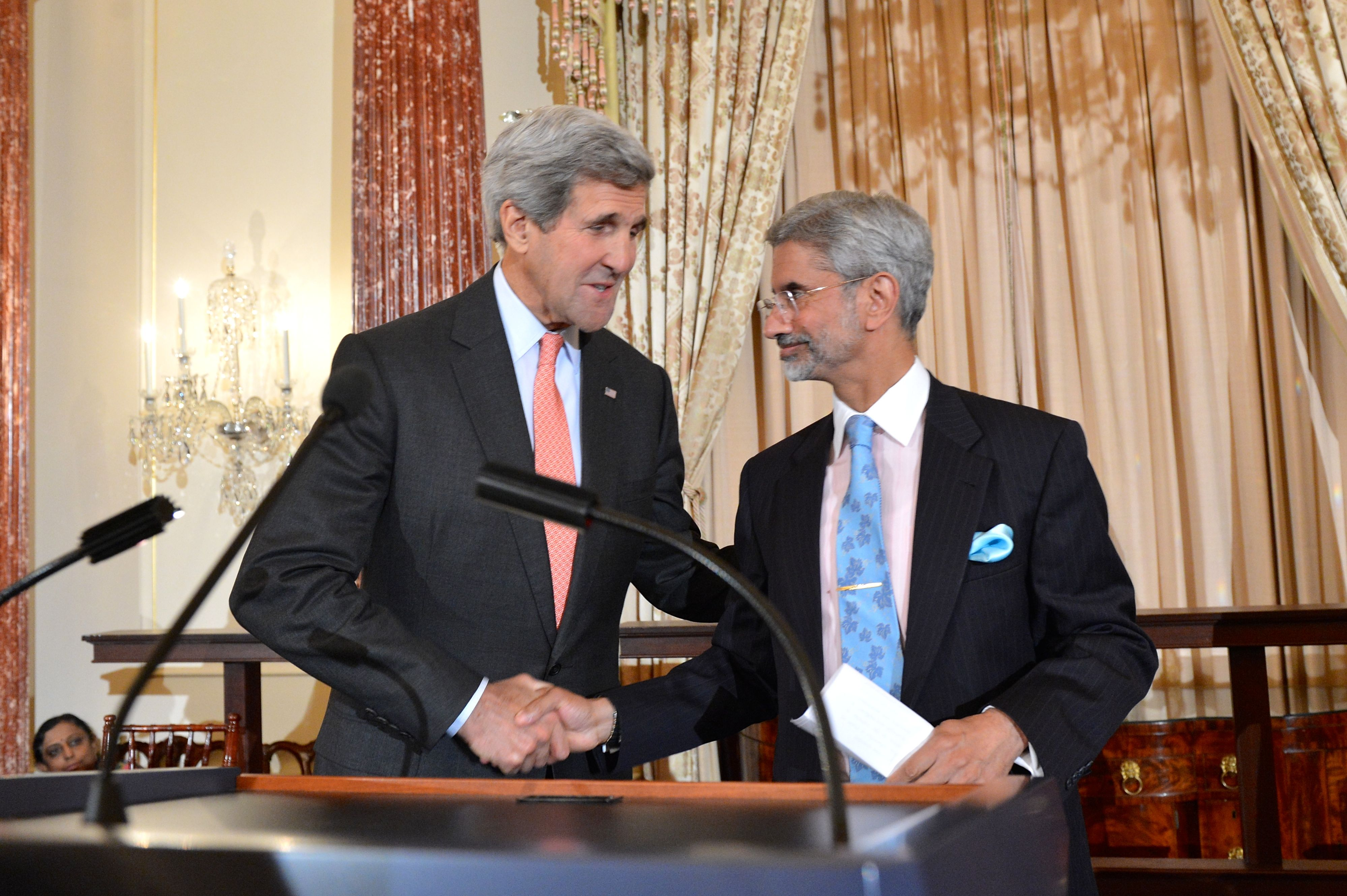
Jaishankar with US secretary of state John Kerry in Washington D.C. in 2014

Jaishankar was appointed India's ambassador to the United States in September 2013. He took charge on 23 December 2013, succeeding Nirupama Rao. He arrived in the United States amid the Devyani Khobragade incident, and was involved in negotiating the Indian diplomat's departure from the country. On 29 January 2014, Jaishankar addressed the Carnegie Endowment for International Peace, where he argued that "the grand strategy underwriting [Indian-American] ties is fundamentally sound" but that ties suffered from a "problem of sentiment."

On 10 March 2014, he formally presented his credentials to US President Barack Obama at the Oval Office. Jaishankar was involved in the planning of the Indian prime minister Narendra Modi's maiden visit to the country in September 2014, welcoming him upon his arrival and hosting a dinner in his honour for members of the Indian-American community.

=== Foreign Secretary (2015–2018) ===
Jaishankar was appointed foreign secretary of India on 29 January 2015. The announcement of his appointment was made following a 28 January 2015 meeting of the appointments committee of the cabinet chaired by the Modi. His tenure extension of one year saw a transformation in the working of the ministry of external affairs. His appointment came three days before the date on which he would ordinarily have retired and meant the unprecedented termination of Sujatha Singh's two-year tenure as foreign secretary. Singh was offered a sinecure as compensation but preferred to resign from government service. Jaishankar is widely criticised by Nepalese analysts for being the "original planner of 2015 Nepal blockade." His tenure expired in January 2018.

=== Corporate career (2018-19) ===
After his retirement from his position as the foreign secretary in 2018, Jaishankar joined the Tata Group as president of global corporate affairs.

== Minister of External Affairs (2019–present) ==
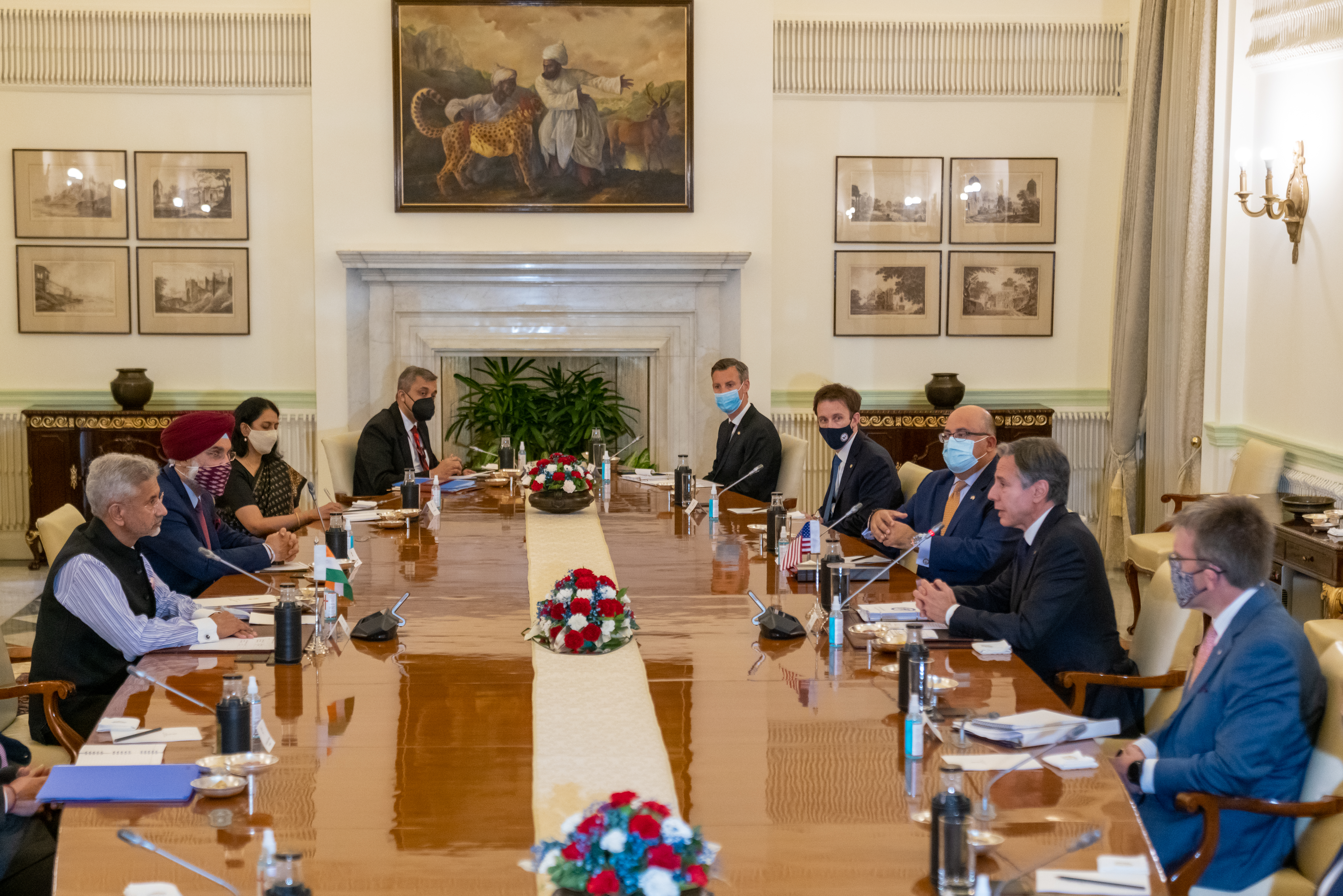
Jaishankar with US secretary of state Antony Blinken in New Delhi in 2021

On 31 May 2019, Jaishankar was appointed to the office of the minister of external affairs in the second Modi ministry. He was sworn in as cabinet minister on 30 May 2019. He is first former foreign secretary of India to head the ministry of external affairs as cabinet minister. On 5 July 2019, he was elected as member of Parliament from the Bharatiya Janata Party (BJP) to the Rajya Sabha from Gujarat. He succeeded Sushma Swaraj who was the external affairs minister in Narendra Modi's first government.

In October 2020, Jaishankar and the Indian minister of defence, Rajnath Singh, met with US secretary of state, Mike Pompeo and US secretary of defence, Mark T. Esper to sign the Basic Exchange and Cooperation Agreement on Geospatial Cooperation (BECA), which facilitates the sharing of sensitive information and intelligence—including access to highly-accurate nautical, aeronautical, topographical, and geospatial data—between United States and India. The agreement had been under discussion for over a decade, but previous concerns over information security impelled the United Progressive Alliance (UPA) coalition government to block it. In response to the dialogue, Wang Wenbin, the Chinese spokesperson for the ministry of foreign affairs, criticised the move and advised Pompeo to "abandon his Cold War mentality, zero-sum mindset, and stop harping on the 'China threat'." In February 2021, when the Modi government came under scrutiny at the 46th session of the United Nations Human Rights Council (UNHRC) for human rights violations, Jaishankar asserted that nations should refrain from interfering in the internal affairs of other countries and should respect national sovereignty.

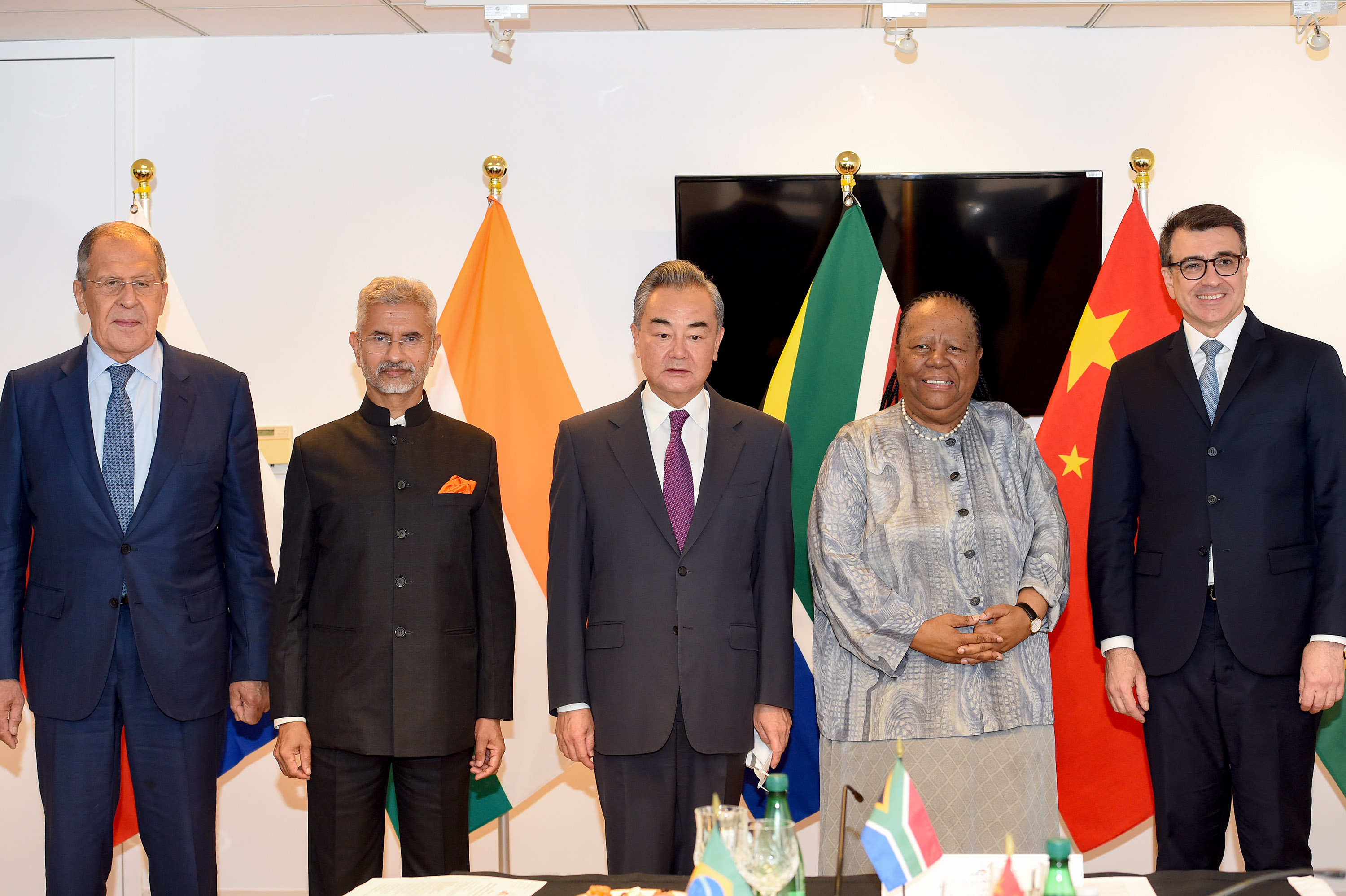
Jaishankar (second from left) with at the BRICS foreign ministers meet in New York on 22 September 2022

In November 2022, during a joint press conference along with Russian foreign minister, Sergey Lavrov, Jaishankar praised Russia as an "exceptionally steady" and "time-tested" partner of India and advocated a return to dialogue and peace between Russia and Ukraine, amid the ongoing Russian invasion of Ukraine. In June 2023, the Associated Press (AP) reported that Jaishankar had announced that India will remain committed in its stance on not inviting Ukraine to the 2023 G20 summit in New Delhi, India. Jaishankar firmly defended buying Russian oil even after sanctions by numerous countries during the Russian invasion of Ukraine, and he criticised Europe for "double standards." During the GLOBSEC 2022 forum in Slovakia, responding to a question on India's official position on Russia's invasion of Ukraine, he said, "Europe has to grow out of the mindset that Europe's problems are the world's problems but the world's problems are not Europe's problems." In response, German chancellor Olaf Scholz said, "he has a point," before adding "it wouldn't be Europe's problem alone if the law of the strong were to assert itself in international relations." During his visit to Germany for the Munich Security Conference, Jaishankar emphasised that Europe must recognise that India cannot adopt the same perspective on Russia as Europe does.

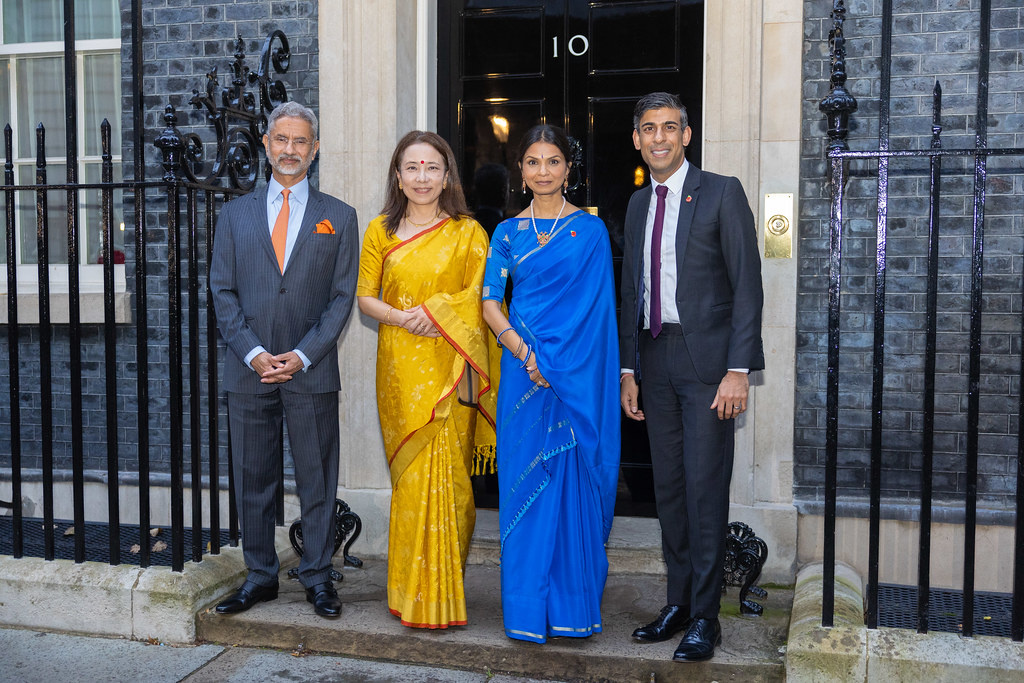
Jaishankar (left) with British prime minister Rishi Sunak (right) at the 10 Downing Street in London in 2023

In August 2022, Jaishankar defended India's continued diplomatic engagement with Myanmar's military junta. In January 2023, Jaishankar called Pakistan "The epicenter of terrorism" in an interview with Austrian broadcaster ORF. He added, "I can use 'much harsher words than epicentre' for Pakistan for its role in promoting cross-border terrorism as he underlined that the world needs to be concerned about terrorism." Later in August 2024, he stated, "The era of uninterrupted dialogue with Pakistan is over. What I do want to say is that we are not passive, and whether events take a positive or negative direction, either way we will react." He condemned the Hamas-led attack on Israel on 7 October 2023 as a terrorist act, but also talked about the plight of the Palestinian people, suggesting a "two-state solution" through "dialogue and negotiation." Jaishankar said, "We have always supported a negotiated two-state solution, towards establishment of a sovereign, independent and viable State of Palestine within secure and recognised borders, living side by side in peace with Israel."

In May 2023, during Bilawal Bhutto Zardari's visit to India for the Shanghai Cooperation Organisation (SCO) meeting, Jaishankar sharply criticised Pakistan's record on terrorism. He described Bilawal Bhutto Zardari, then the Pakistani minister for foreign affairs, as a "promoter, justifier and spokesperson of a terrorism industry," asserting that this industry was the mainstay of Pakistan. Jaishankar stated, "Victims of terrorism do not sit together with perpetrators of terrorism to discuss terrorism," and emphasised that India would continue to defend itself, counter acts of terrorism, and delegitimise Pakistan's support for such activities. He further remarked that Pakistan's credibility on terrorism was "depleting even faster than its forex reserves," and dismissed any suggestion of normal engagement while cross-border terrorism persisted.

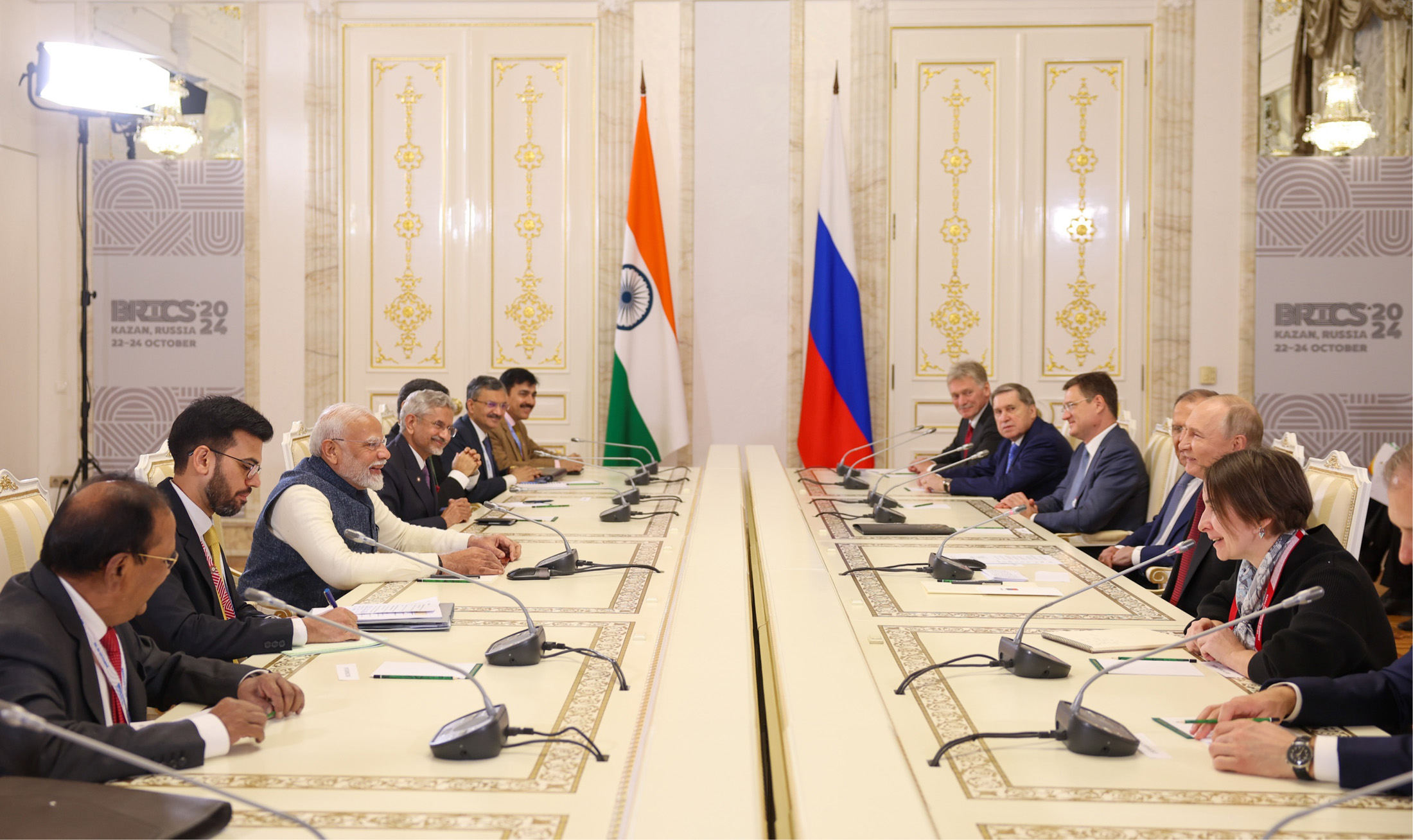
Jaishankar with Indian prime minister Narendra Modi and Russian president Vladimir Putin at the 16th BRICS summit in Kazan, Russia on 22 October 2024

Jaishankar has been credited for maintaining stable relations between India and China after the Doklam standoff. In October 2024, responding on the relationship with China, he said at Carnegie Endowment for International Peace in Washington, "The overall relationship with China had 'not been great' over the last few years because China had reneged on certain agreements it had with India about how to keep the border between the two countries tranquil." In September 2024, on trade with China, he said at the Gulf Cooperation Council Joint Ministerial Meeting in Riyadh, "We are not closed to business from China. There is nobody who can say I will not do business with China. I think the issue is which sectors do you do business in and on what terms you do business. It is far more complicated than a black and white binary answer." During an official visit to London in March 2025, his security was breached.

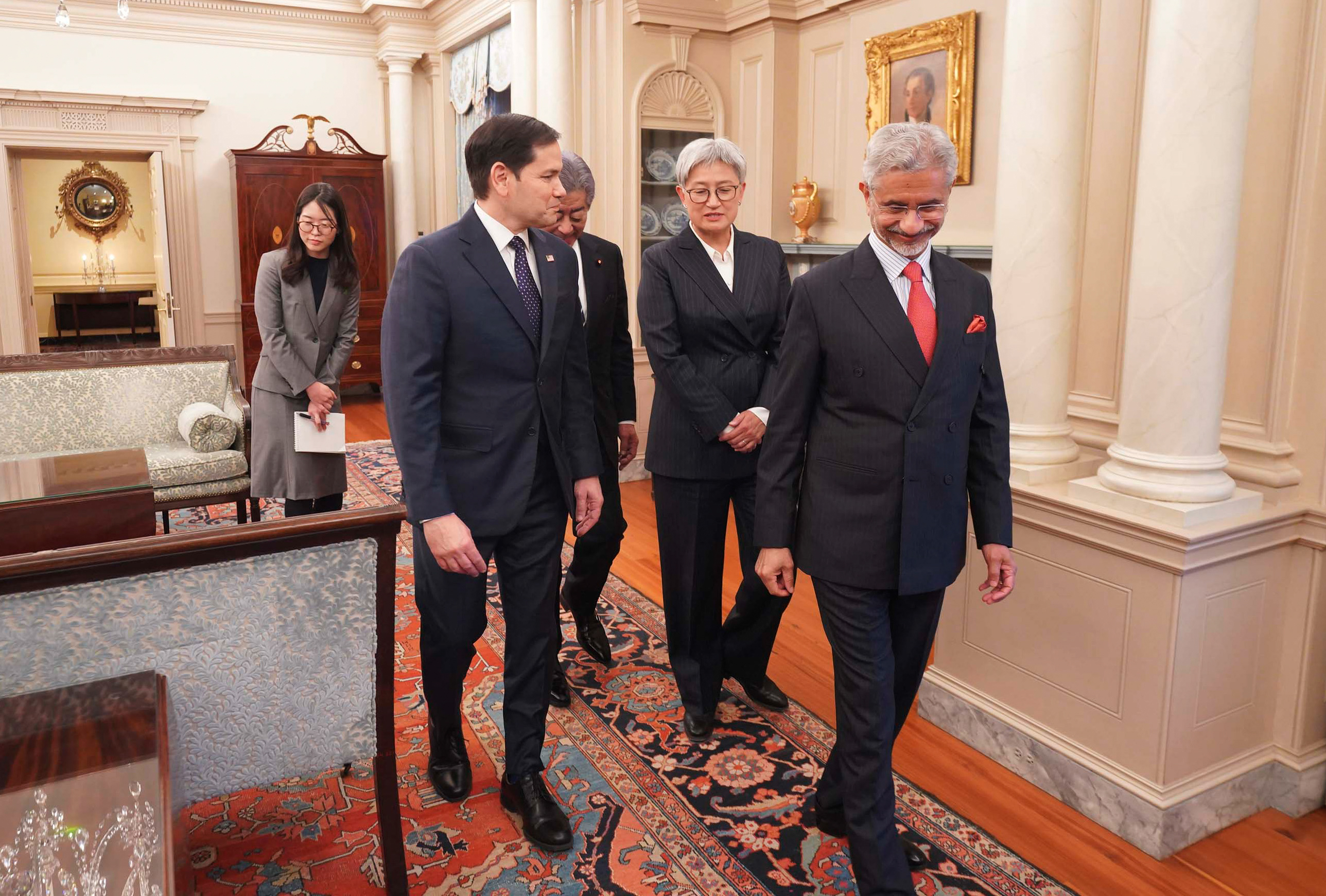
Jaishankar (front right) with the foreign ministers of Quad in January 2025

During the 2025 India–Pakistan conflict, Jaishankar played a pivotal diplomatic role. Jaishankar in an undated video said, "At the start of the operation, we had sent a message to Pakistan, saying, 'We are striking at terrorist infrastructure and we are not striking at the military.'" This statement was criticised by the opposition leaders such as Rahul Gandhi who accused Jaishankar of tipping-off Pakistan. The MEA later said that Jaishankar had informed Pakistan after India launched the military operation. According to Jaishankar, Pakistan initiated fire following India's strikes and the exchange ceased at Pakistan's request. In July 2025, he rejected claims of US mediation in the ceasefire with Pakistan. However, Trump reiterated multiple times that he mediated ceasefire between India and Pakistan.

On 22 September 2026, Mr. Jaishankar led a meeting with French Foreign Minister Jean-Noël Barrot and UAE Foreign Minister Sheikh Abdullah bin Zayed Al Nahyan, to discuss joint projects in space, artificial intelligence, and culture, as well as political developments in West Asia.

== Political career (2019-present) ==
Jaishankar entered active politics in 2019 after a long career in the Indian Foreign Service and a brief stint in the private sector. He is a member of the Bharatiya Janata Party and has served as India’s Minister of External Affairs continuously since May 2019. He is the first former Foreign Secretary of India to hold the External Affairs portfolio as a Cabinet minister.

=== Entry into government and the second Modi ministry ===
Following the BJP-led National Democratic Alliance’s victory in the 2019 general election, Jaishankar was inducted into the Union Cabinet. He was sworn in as a Cabinet minister on 30 May 2019 and formally assumed charge as Minister of External Affairs on 31 May 2019, succeeding Sushma Swaraj.

S. Jaishankar during 2024 Lok Sabha elections, Promoting BJP for elections.

At the time of his induction he was not a member of either house of Parliament. Under Indian constitutional practice, a minister who is not a member of Parliament must be elected to either the Lok Sabha or the Rajya Sabha within six months.

=== Rajya Sabha elections ===
In July 2019, Jaishankar contested a by-election to the Rajya Sabha from Gujarat for one of the seats vacated by Amit Shah and Smriti Irani after they were elected to the Lok Sabha. The BJP fielded him along with Jugalji Thakor. Voting was held on 5 July 2019 in the Gujarat Legislative Assembly. Jaishankar secured 104 votes and was declared elected; he took the oath as a Member of Parliament on 8 July 2019. His first term began on 5 July 2019.

In 2023, he was re-nominated by the BJP for a second term from Gujarat. On 17 July 2023, Jaishankar, along with BJP candidates Babubhai Desai and Kesridevsinh Jhala, was elected unopposed to the Rajya Sabha after the opposition did not field candidates (owing to its limited strength in the Gujarat Assembly). His second term began in August 2023 and is scheduled to run until 2029. (Note: He continues to represent Gujarat in the Rajya Sabha.)

== Personal life ==
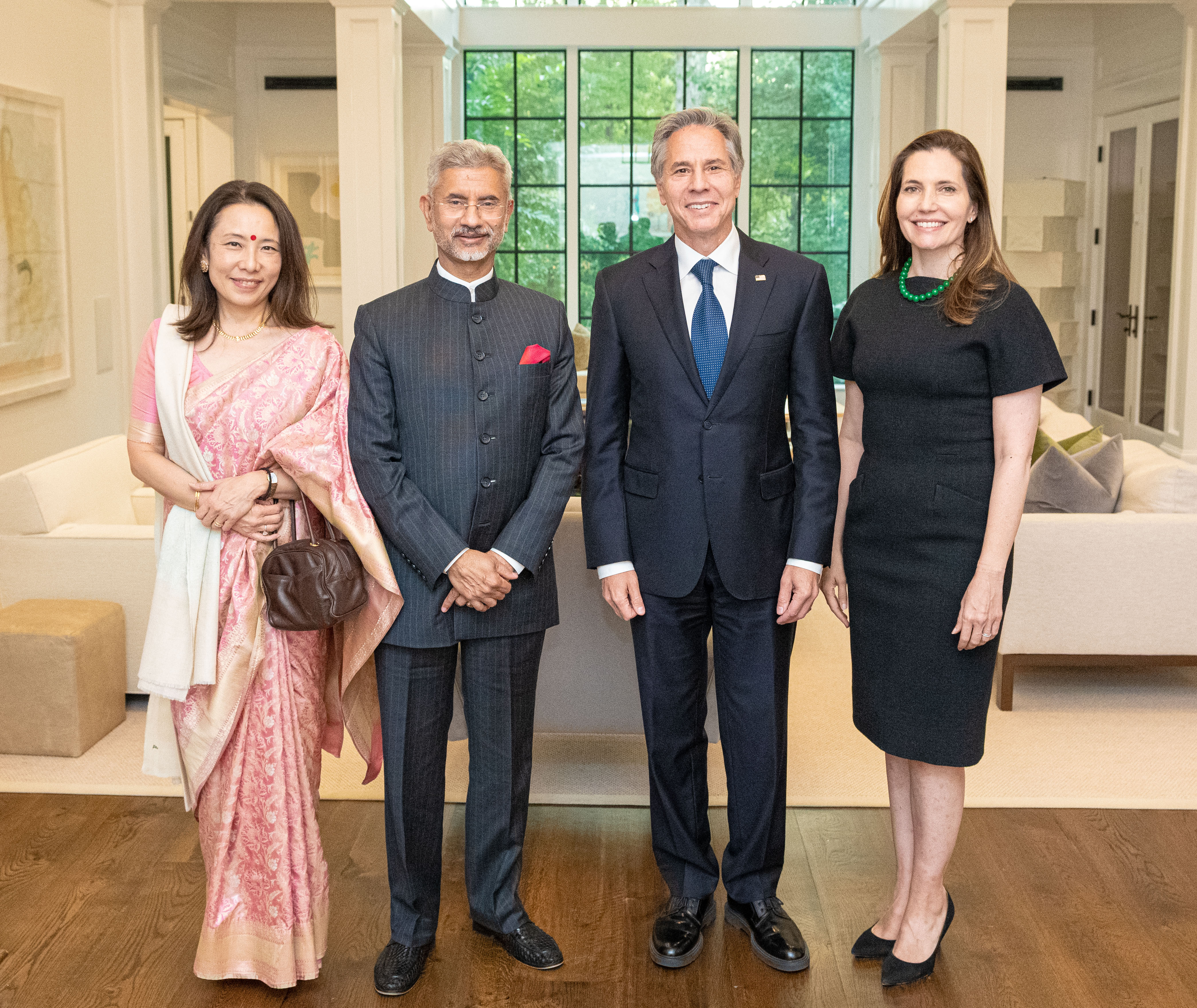
Jaishankar (second left) with his wife Kyoko (left corner) at the US in 2021

The President, Shri Ram Nath Kovind presenting the Padma Shri Award to Dr. S. Jaishankar, at the Civil Investiture Ceremony-I, at Rashtrapati Bhavan, in New Delhi on 11 March 2019.

Jaishankar was married to Shobha until she succumbed to cancer. The two had met while studying at the Jawaharlal Nehru University. Later, he married Kyoko Somekawa. Somekawa is of Japanese origin, and both of them met while Jaishankar was serving in the Indian embassy in Japan.

He has three children, son Dhruva and daughter Medha from his first marriage, and son Arjun, from his second marriage.

== Awards and honours ==
List of Awards and honors received by S. Jaishankar, as of 2026.

Awards and honours
Award name	Year	By whom
Padma Shri	2019	The Government of India
ET Reformer of the Year Award	2023	The Economic Times
Sri Chandrasekarendra Saraswathi National Eminence Award	2024	The South Indian Education Society (SIES)
"India First" Award	2024	The NDTV
Honorary Doctor of Philosophy - Honoris Causa	2025	The Indian Institute of Management Calcutta

== Published works ==
- Jaishankar, S. (2020). The India Way. Harper Collins. p. 240. ISBN 978-9390163878.
- Jaishankar, S. (2024). Why Bharat Matters. Rupa Publications. ISBN 978-9357026406.

== See also ==
- Premiership of Narendra Modi

== Notes ==
Diplomatic posts
Preceded by Girish Dhume	Indian Ambassador to the Czech Republic; 2000–2004	Succeeded by P. S. Raghavan
Preceded by Alok Prasad	Indian High Commissioner to Singapore; 2007–2009	Succeeded by T. C. A. Raghavan
Preceded by Nirupama Rao	Indian Ambassador to China; 2009–2013	Succeeded by Ashok Kantha
Preceded by Nirupama Rao	Indian Ambassador to the United States; 2013–2015	Succeeded by Arun Kumar Singh
Preceded by Sujatha Singh	Foreign Secretary of India; 2015–2018	Succeeded by Vijay Keshav Gokhale
Political offices
Preceded by Sushma Swaraj	Minister of External Affairs; 30 May 2019 – present	Incumbent
