= Gopamau =

- Town
- Location in Uttar Pradesh, India Gopamau (India)
- Coordinates: 27.55°N 80.28°E
- Country: India
- State: Uttar Pradesh
- District: Hardoi

Area
  - Total: 3.05 km^{2} (1.18 sq mi)
- Elevation: 143 m (469 ft)

Population (2011)
  - Total: 15,526
  - Density: 5,090/km^{2} (13,200/sq mi)

Languages
  - Official: Hindi
- Time zone: UTC+5:30 (IST)
- Vehicle registration: UP-30
- Website: up.gov.in

Gopamau is a town and nagar panchayat in Hardoi district, Uttar Pradesh, India. Located just west of the Gomti river, Gopamau is a historic town that once served as a pargana headquarters. Important industries include cap making, tobacco, and agricultural products. As of 2011, the population of Gopamau is 15,526, in 2,346 households. The town has several slum areas (namely Achrajan, Banjara, Ghanauji East & West, Lalpir, and Matehna), which are home to 36.07% of town residents.

== History ==
Gopamau's early history is purely traditional, and those traditions are often somewhat conflicting. The earliest inhabitants were the Thatheras, who are said to have lived in cleared areas in the forests known as Mawa Sarai or Mawa Chachar. There was an image of Mahadeo called Gopinath here, which still exists, as well as two red stone idols called Kaurehru Deo and Badal Deo. The Thatheras were then driven out by the Ahbans Rajputs under Gopal Singh and Sarup Singh, also known by the nicknames Gopi and Sopi, who had been on their way from Patan to Gaya. Upon reaching Kannauj, the king Jaichand sent them to subdue the Thatheras, which they did. Sopi then made his residence at Bhainsri, while Gopi went further north to Gopamau.

Tradition also holds that Salar Masud's army then came to Gopamau. He was not the first Muslim in Gopamau — a devotee from Mecca named Azmat Shah had already settled in the town under Raja Gopi. Unwilling to betray his patron, Azmat Shah advised Gopi to abandon the city in order to prevent bloodshed, and thus the city came under Salar Masud's control. Salar Masud then went on to Satrikh, where he appointed Mir Sayyid Aziz-ud-Din to be the governor of Gopamau. Mir Sayyid Aziz-ud-Din, also known as the Lal Pir, remained governor until two years after Masud died at Bahraich; Lal Pir was killed in battle against Hindus. The dargah of Lal Pir is the oldest building in Gopamau; it was built in 1232 and later restored in 1795 by Nawab Muhammad Ali Khan, the Subahdar of Arcot, who was himself a Gopamau native. He also rebuilt the Jami Masjid from Akbar's time in 1786; the building had previously been destroyed by an earthquake. At the same time as Lal Pir's death, Azmat Shah took poison to commit suicide, and his tomb is in the Azmat Tola neighbourhood.

Another tradition says that the Ahbans rajas were defeated by the Chishti Shaikhs, who had been sent by the Delhi Sultan Altamsh. Their leader, Khwaja Taj-ud-Din Husain, built a fort and a mosque at Gopamau, and he was also responsible for the construction of Lal Pir's dargah in 1232 (on the advice of his religious mentor Khwaja Qutb-ud-Din). The Chishtis founded the Chishtpura quarter on the east side of town, which also has a well built during the reign of Akbar by Khwaja Habibullah, with an inscription dating it to 979 AH. Another Shaikh group, the Kannaujias, founded a new mohalla during the reign of Akbar; one prominent member of this group was Anwaruddin Khan, who became Subahdar of Arcot in 1745.

The Sayyids of Gopamau trace their origin to the year 1208, when their ancestor Sayyid Muin-ud-Din came here from Kannauj. His descendants, Abdul Qadir and Abdul Jalal, were appointed qanungos of Gopamau pargana during the reign of Humayun.

The so-called mohalla of the muftis originated when one Sheikh Muhammad Adam Siddiqi came to Gopamau in 1543, during the reign of Sher Shah Suri. A member of this family, Muhammad Zaman, was appointed mufti, and the office remained in the family until the British annexation. The most famous member of this family was Wahaj-ud-Din, a renowned scholar who wrote the Fatwa-i-Alamgiri and served as the tutor of Dara Shikoh.

Another Muslim mohalla, Zaidpuria, was founded in 1562 by Qazi Bhure Faruqi and Hazrat Bandagi Nizam-ud-Din, who had come from Zaidpur in today's Barabanki district. One member of this family, Ghulam Hasan Khan, was appointed subahdar of Gujarat by Azam Shah. The Khatiban mohalla derives its name from the khatibs who read prayers for the ruler. This position was hereditary and it was held by the same family from the time of Akbar until the British took over. Another neighbourhood was named after the mutawallis, or custodians of the mosques, who claim descent from one Sheikh Ghiul, who came to Gopamau during the reign of Ala-ud-Din. The title was first granted to Sheikh Karim by Akbar and again stayed in the family until the British annexation. One distinguished member of this family was Sheikh Maulvi Abdul Karim, a celebrated lawyer who wrote a work on jurisprudence called the Fatwa-i-Majma-ul-Masael. The Banjaras and Batwars, two groups who each had a mohalla named after them, both claim descent from followers of Salar Masud.

Of the historic Hindu quarters, the main one was that of the Kayasths, who were divided into two branches: one held the office of qanungo from the time of Humayun until Wajid Ali Shah; the other branch was that of the muharrirs. One member of that branch was Lala Nauniddh Rai, who rose to distinction during the reign of Aurangzeb. Constantly harassed by the Muslim governors, he ended up resigning his office of revenue collector in frustration and becoming a mendicant. The revenue fell into arrears and the matter eventually reached Delhi, and Nauniddh Rai ended up being restored to his office. He went on to build the tank and temple of Gopinath in 1699. During the reign of Asaf-ud-Daula, 30 of the nawab's elephants were kept and watered here, which ended up destroying the steps leading to the tank.

At the turn of the 20th century, Gopamau had a slight Muslim majority and hosted bazaars on Thursdays and Sundays. It had a middle vernacular school, at the house of Maulvi Tafazzul Husain in the Qazi's mohalla, a branch post office, a cattle pound, and a fort. The town was noted for producing arsis, or thumb mirrors made out of silver.

== Geography ==
Gopamau is located at 27.55°N 80.28°E. It has an average elevation of 143 metres (469 feet).

== Demographics ==
Historical population
Year	Pop.	±%
1901	5,656	—
1911	5,545	−2.0%
1921	4,631	−16.5%
1931	Not given	—
1941	Not given	—
1951	Not given	—
1961	Not given	—
1971	Not given	—
1981	8,267	—
1991	10,255	+24.0%
2001	12,615	+23.0%
2011	15,526	+23.1%
Source: 2011 Census of India

At the 2001 India census, Gopamau had a population of 12,604. Males constituted 54% of the population and females 46%. Gopamau had an average literacy rate of 37%, lower than the national average of 59.5%: male literacy was 44%, and female literacy was 30%. In Gopamau, 19% of the population was under 6 years of age.

The 2011 Census of India recorded the population of Gopamau as 15,526 people, of whom 8,192 were male and 7,334 were female. The corresponding sex ratio of 895 females to every 1000 males was slightly lower than the district urban ratio of 899. The sex ratio in the 0-6 age group was 972, which was the highest among towns in Hardoi district. Members of scheduled castes made up 9.5% of the town's population, while there were no recorded members of scheduled tribes living in town at the time. The literacy rate of Gopamau was 52.25% (counting only people age 7 and up), which was the lowest among towns in the district. Female literacy was very low, with only 45.94% of women and girls able to read and write, compared to 57.81% of men and boys. In terms of employment, 21.34% of Gopamau residents were classified as main workers (i.e. people employed for at least 6 months per year), while 11.90% were counted as marginal workers. The remaining 66.77% were non-workers. Employment status varied significantly according to gender, with 45.93% of men but only 8.40% of women being either main or marginal workers.
