= Suhaldev =

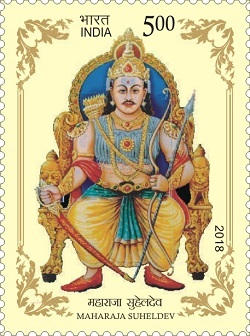
- Suhaldev on a 2018 stamp.

Maharaja of Shravasti
- Reign: 11th century – June 1034
- Died: June 1034
- Religion: Hinduism

Suhaldev was a legendary king from Shravasti town of India. Persian hagiography Mirat-i-Masudi, written in 17th century, popularly mentions him to have defeated and killed the Ghaznavid general Ghazi Saiyyad Salar Masud at Bahraich in 1034 CE. He was killed by Syed Ibrahim, a commander of Salar Masud.

== Sources ==
During the reign of Jahangir (r. 1605–1627), Abd-ur-Rahman Chishti penned Mirat-i-Masudi, a Persian hagiography in praise of Ghazi Miyan, a Turkic commander. It is doubtful whether Miyan existed at all but he was already occupying a prominent spot-of-veneration in public memory as a quasi-mythic warrior-saint and Chisti accentuated the process, employing an imaginary past.

Suhaldev is mentioned in the same chronicles, as the eldest son of King Mordhwaj of Shravasti and Miyan's chief antagonist in the Bahraich region.

== Legend ==
In different versions of the legends, Suhaldev is known by different names, including Sakardev, Suhirdadhwaj, Suhridil, Suhridal-dhaj, Rai Suhrid Dev, Susaj, Suhardal, Sohildar, Shahardev, Sahardev, Suhar Deo, Sahar Deo, Suhaaldev, Suhildev, Suheldev, Sohal Deo and Suheldeo.

Ghazi Miyan, after his initial invasions established his capital at Satrikh and then, dispatched an army to defeat the local king. Despite defeating the local Raja of Bahraich (who had even formed a confederation with other Hindu kings) under the commandeering of his father, his rule was continuously threatened by the Rajahs. Therefore, in 1033 CE, Miyan himself arrived in Bahraich to check their advance and re-defeated his enemies, until the arrival of Suhaldev.

Suhaldev's army defeated Miyan's forces and a nineteen year old Miyan was killed-in-action on 15 June 1034. He was buried in Bahraich on the banks of a sacred reservoir, and in 1035 CE, a dargah was built. Right after the death of Miyan, Syed Ibrahim, a commander of Miyan killed Suhaldev.

== Politicization ==
Various caste groups have attempted to appropriate Suhaldev as one of their own. Chisti noted Suhaldev to have belonged to the "Bhar Tharu" community. Subsequent writers spanning from colonial ethnographers to postcolonial bureaucrats have identified his caste variously as Bhar, Rajbhar, Tharu, Bais Rajput, Pandav Vanshi Tomar, Jain Rajput, Bharshiv, Tharu Kalhan, Nagavanshi Kshatriya, and Visen Kshatriya.

In 1940, Guru Sahay Dikshit Dwijdeen, a local schoolteacher of Bahraich, composed a long panegyric poem titled Sri Suhal Bavani. Influenced by Arya Samaj, he projected Suhaldev as a Jain king and a saviour of the Hindu culture against Islamic invaders. The poem became very popular, and was regularly recited at local gatherings with martial aesthetics. As the first printed version appeared in 1950 after partition, local elites took to glorifying Suhaldev.

In April 1950, Arya Samaj, Ram Rajya Parishad and Hindu Mahasabha Sangathan — who had been long demanding a memorial for Suhaldev — planned a fair at Chittora to commemorate him. Khwaja Khalil Ahmad Shah, a member of the Ghazi Miyan Dargah Committee, appealed the district administration to ban the proposed fair, in order to avoid communal tensions. Accordingly, prohibitory orders were issued preventing unlawful assembly of more than five people but a group of local Hindus actively flouted it, forcing their way into the local municipality office. As a riot ensued, the main instigators were jailed but the Hindus shut down the local markets for a week and courted arrest in batches. A conservative section of Indian National Congress under the leadership of Vaidya Bhagwandeen Mishra joined the protest, and around 2000 people went to jail before the administration relented and lifted the prohibitory orders.

Subsequently, the local Congressmen organized the fair and also established Suhaldev Smarak Samiti ("Suhaldev Monument Committee") to construct a temple of Suhaldev. Two local painters — Lalit Nag and Rajkumar Nag — sketched Suhaldev for the first time, which was displayed around the city in an elephant procession before being installed in the town-center alongside images of Hindu deities and saints. A princely state ruler of Prayagpur donated 500 bighas of land (including the Chittora Lake) to the Samiti where the temple was constructed within a year. The primary sculpture was made of clay and themed on the painting; it was later changed to cement. The first priest was Bibhisan Narain Puri, affiliated to the Hindu Mahasabha. Alongside the celebration of Maharaja Suhaldev Vijayotsav in remembrance of his victory over Ghazi Miyan, a Rajyabhisek Utsav was invented on the day of Vasant Panchami to commemorate his coronation.

Henceforth, throughout the 1950s and 1960s, the Suhaldev Smarak Samiti started characterizing Suhaldev as a Pasi king to influence the Pasis, a Dalit community which were an important votebank around Bahraich. Gradually, the Pasis themselves latched onto the trend. Since the 80s, Bharatiya Janata Party (BJP), Vishwa Hindu Parishad (VHP) and Rashtriya Swayamsevak Sangh (RSS) have actively sought to co-opt Suhaldev within their fold of Hindu Nationalist ideology in a bid to improve electoral prospects in Bahraich and adjoining localities. Starting in the 1980s, BJP-VHP-RSS organized fairs to celebrate the Suhaldev legend, characterizing him as a Hindu Dalit who fought against a Muslim invader.

Maharaja Suhaldev Sewa Samiti, found in 2001, has been at the forefront of reifying Suhaldev as a defender of the Hindu faith. Booklets are printed, pamphlets distributed, and festivals organized in his honor, where Suhaldev is characterized as a protector of cows, patron of saints and protector of Hindus from Muslim invasions. In one of these versions, Miyan plans to place a herd of cows in front of his army, so that Suhaldev could not attack his forces directly (since cows are sacred to Hindus). However, Suhaldev gets apprised of this plan and cuts the cows loose on the night before the battle. It was also lamented that the Hindus chose to forgot Suhaldev whilst being all keen on visiting the dargah of a foreign invader, which was "originally" an ashram (hermitage) of Balark Rishi. Alongside these narratives about Suhaldev and Ghazi Miyan, a revisionist reading about the general history of Pasis under Muslim rule is propounded as well.

Murli Manohar Joshi, a veteran BJP politician, had mentioned in his electoral rallies that Suhaldev had stopped conversion of Hindus to Muslims. Multiple statues of Suhaldev, in increasing martial tones, have been installed across Uttar Pradesh. On 24 February 2016, BJP president Amit Shah unveiled another statue of Suhaldev in Bahraich. In 2017, Uttar Pradesh Chief Minister Yogi Adityanath spoke at a Hindu Vijay Utsav ("Hindu Victory Festival") organized by VHP to mark Suhaldev's victory and expressed his agreement over the VHP's demand to rebuild a Surya Temple at Balaar in Bahraich (which is currently the site of Ghazi Miya's mazaar), and construct yet another memorial for Suhaldev. On 29 December 2018, Prime Minister Narendra Modi released a commemorative stamp on Maharaja Suhaldev.

The outcomes of these social-engineering efforts are however complex. Badri Narayanan noted in 2006 that Hindus continued to visit the dargah and most of them rejected the narrative peddled by RSS; they believed Suhaldev to be an oppressive ruler, from whose clutches their forefathers were liberated by Ghazi Miyan.

On 24 June 2019, Om Prakash Rajbhar - the president of Suheldev Bharatiya Samaj Party - unveiled a statue of Suhaldev in Indore village of Ghazipur district.

=== Maharaja Suheldev Memorial ===
On 16 February 2021, the foundation stone of Maharaja Suheldev Memorial was laid in Bahraich, Uttar Pradesh, through video conferencing by Prime Minister Narendra Modi for the project that would include the installation of an equestrian statue of Maharaja Suheldev. The Government of Uttar Pradesh, headed by Yogi Adityanath, celebrated the day as the birth anniversary of Suheldev and issued an official note on stating, "King Suheldev had fought, defeated and killed the Ghaznavid general Ghazi Saiyyad Salar Masud in a famous battle held on the bank of Chittora lake in Bahraich in 1033."

== In popular culture ==
- Legend of Suheldev: The King Who Saved India, a novel by Amish Tripathi, is based on the legend of Suhaldev

== See also ==
- Suhaildev SF Express, a passenger train named after Suhaldev
