= Bhojpuri profanity =

Profane words used in Bhojpuri Language

The profane words used in Bhojpuri language can be divided into several categories.

== Profanity related to mythology ==
| Romanized | Kaithi /Devanagari | Definition |
|---|---|---|
| Kumbhakarna | 𑂍𑂳𑂧𑂹𑂦𑂍𑂩𑂢/ कुंभकरन | It's a mythological character from Ramayana and is used for someone who sleeps too much. |
| Narada | 𑂢𑂰𑂩𑂠 / नारद | used for a double dealer. |
| Manthara | 𑂧𑂢𑂹𑂟𑂩𑂰 / मंथरा | used for a crooked woman. |
| Maleccha | 𑂧𑂪𑂵𑂓𑂹 / मलेछ | Used for Wretched fellow |
| Ravana | 𑂩𑂰𑂫𑂢 / रावन | For a Cruel, Tryant person. |

== Profanity related to birds and animals ==
Such profane words are used to imply the quality to the birds and animals in the person the words are being used. Some of such words are:

| Bhojpuri | Romanized | English meaning |
|---|---|---|
| 𑂏𑂱𑂠𑂹𑂡 | giddha | Vulture |
| 𑂏𑂠𑂯𑂰 | gadahā | Ass |
| 𑂮𑂰𑂀𑂣 | sānp | Snake |
| 𑂥𑂰𑂢𑂩 | bānar | Monkey |
| 𑂍𑂳𑂞𑂹𑂞𑂲 | kuttī | Dog |
| 𑂇𑂩𑂳𑂫𑂰 | uruwā | Owl |
| 𑂮𑂳𑂫𑂩𑂲 | suwarī | Pig |
| 𑂥𑂶𑂪 | bail | Ox |
| 𑂍𑂳𑂍𑂹𑂍𑂳𑂩 | kukkur | Dog |
| 𑂍𑂳𑂍𑂴𑂩 | ghoḍā | Horse |

== Profanity related to bad habits ==
| Bhojpuri | Romanized | English meaning |
|---|---|---|
| 𑂣𑂩𑂹𑂪𑂰𑂨𑂰 | parlāyā | lazy person. |
| 𑂣𑂱𑂨𑂍𑂹𑂍𑂚 | piyakkar̤ | drunkard |

== Profanity related to kinship or sex relations ==
Due to patriarchy in the society women are generally the first target of these words. Abuse to one's mother, sister or daughter sounds more pinching.

- sāra (𑂮𑂰𑂩/सार) : Literally means wife's brother or sibling-in-law. The redundant form saravā is also used.

== Bibliography ==
- Mishra, Ram Baksh (2003). "5: Abuses". Sociology of Bhojpuri Language. Varanasi: Swasti Publications.
