= No Place to Call My Own =

2025 debut novel by Alina Gufran

- Author: Alina Gufran
- Language: English
- Genre: Literary fiction
- Publisher: Tranquebar (Westland Books)
- Publication date: 27 January 2025
- Publication place: India
- Media type: Print
- Pages: 262

No Place to Call My Own is a 2025 novel by the Indian writer and filmmaker Alina Gufran. It was published by Tranquebar, an imprint of Westland Books, on 27 January 2025, and is Gufran's first novel. The book follows Sophia, a young woman of mixed Hindu and Muslim parentage, through her twenties and across several cities, set against political and social events in India between 2019 and the COVID-19 pandemic.

== Synopsis ==
Sophia is the daughter of an Arya Samaji Hindu mother and a Muslim father whose marriage was opposed by both families. As a child she learns to switch between Hindu and Muslim greetings depending on which relatives she is with, and is known as Mehak to her mother's family. Her parents separate, and Sophia drifts through her teens and twenties. She wants to become a filmmaker but takes up jobs she does not keep and struggles during a period of film training. A long section of the novel records a self-destructive phase of drinking, drug use and short-lived relationships in cities including Delhi, Mumbai and Prague. Its later parts turn to Sophia's strained relationship with her mother and to her friendship with Medha. The Citizenship Amendment Act protests, the #MeToo movement and the COVID-19 pandemic form the backdrop.

== Reception ==
Reviewing the book for Scroll.in, Sayari Debnath found the long middle section recording Sophia's drinking and drug use repetitive, but praised Gufran's treatment of women's relationships, singling out the mother–daughter bond and the friendship with Medha, and noted the recurring theme of unbelonging and the precariousness of Muslim life in India.

In Open, the novel was described as an introspective and unflinching account of a woman caught between longing and loss, dealing with self-sabotage and a fractured sense of identity. The Hindu noted the novel's exploration of the experiences of millennial women against a backdrop of political and social change.

Mint Lounge described the work as a coming-of-age narrative that intertwines personal struggles with broader questions of identity and belonging, while The Indian Express praised its treatment of family, religion and social alienation.
