= Dharma: Decoding the Epics for a Meaningful Life =

2020 non-fiction book by Amish Tripathi

- Author: Amish Tripathi, Bhavna Roy
- Language: English
- Genre: Non-fiction
- Publisher: Westland Publications
- Publication date: 28 December 2020
- Publication place: India
- Media type: Print (paperback, hardback)
- Pages: 224
- ISBN: 9389648882

Dharma: Decoding the Epics for a Meaningful Life is the second non-fiction book by the best-selling Indian author Amish Tripathi following his previous non-fiction book Immortal India, which was released in 2017. Co-authored by his elder sister Bhavna Roy, Dharma: Decoding the Epics for a Meaningful Life conveys practical and philosophical lessons drawn from ancient Hindu epics. It was released on 28 December 2020 and is published by Westland Publications.

The book is written in the form of conversations between characters set in modern-day India that are relatable and echo the insights and lessons from Upanishads, Mahabharata and Amish's fiction books, the Shiva Trilogy and Ram Chandra series.
