= Raavan: Enemy of Aryavarta =

2019 novel by Amish Tripathi

- First edition
- Author: Amish Tripathi
- Language: English
- Genre: Epic fiction
- Publisher: Westland Publications
- Publication date: 1 July 2019
- Publication place: India
- Media type: Print (paperback, hardback)
- ISBN: 9388754085
- Preceded by: Sita: Warrior of Mithila
- Followed by: The War of Lanka

Raavan: Enemy of Aryavarta is the seventh book of Amish Tripathi, sixth book of Amishverse, and third book of Ram Chandra Series. It chronicles the life of Ravan until the time he kidnaps Sita. The book was released on 1 July 2019 and published by Westland.

== Plot ==
Raavan was the first child of Maharishi Vishrava. He was power hungry from childhood. He was born a Naga but it was kept secret from others in his tribe. He is enamored by the Kanyakumari of Vaidyanath, who asks Raavan to be a better person. When Raavan's brother is born a Naga, the nine year old Ravaan along with his maternal uncle Mareech, has to fight with his father's disciples to keep his baby brother alive. They eventually flee and after their maternal family also disowns them, and go to Vaidyanath to meet the Kanyakumari. There they are informed that, the Kanyakumari has changed. With a sad heart, Raavan decides to leave Vaidyanath.

They then reach the southern part of India. Due to the Kshatriya community being in power, the Vaishyas are less influential in the Sapt Sindhu. Raavan started to work as a smuggler at the age of ten. He provided for his mother, his brother Kumbhakarna (named as the ears of the boy resemble the Kumbha (pots)), whom he loves dearly and his maternal uncle Mareech, who stayed with him through thick & thin. Raavan was deeply in love with the Kanyakumari, whose name or whereabouts he didn't know. Raavan became more powerful when he started a business by taking over Akampana's ship. They also save a girl child Samichi and the child vows to be faithful to Ravaan, her Iraiva.

During a planned attack on Krakachabahu, the governor of Chilika, who has hidden his wealth from the King of Kalinga, Raavan once again sees the Kanyakumari. Kumbhakarna, being the dutiful and loyal brother, searched for her, and found her assuming a new identity - Vedavati. She is married to Prithvi, a small trader and is pregnant now. Raavan, tries to woo Vedavati but to no avail. When Vedavati and her husband are killed by the son of the village leader where they reside, for the hundi that Raavan gave her, Raavan orders the massacre of all the villagers and becomes a ruthless person, vowing to destroy the Sapt Sindhu.

Ravaan goes on to become more powerful by taking control of the trading of Lanka and becomes the general of Kuber, the chief trader. He takes control of the money in Sapt Sindhu by defeating Dashrath, the king of Ayodhya, at the battle of Karachapa. Lanka becomes the richest city among the Sapt Sindhu. Ravaan becomes more ruthless day by day. Kumbha, though still faithful to Ravaan, becomes distant from him, as he wants to follow his dharma. Ravaan marries Mandodari and had a son Indrajit whom he loves deeply.

Ravaan has many plans in his head. On one side, he knows the secret about Prince Angad's true father and wishes to use it to conquer Kishkindha and merge its army with his depleted one. He also wants to be declared a Living God by the Council of Wise Men in Mithila. This becomes the primary reason why he wants to marry Princess Sita, the prime minister of Mithila, but is heavily humiliated by the underhanded tactics of the Malayaputras and Sita, who wants to marry Ram. Raavan besieges Mithila with 10,000 of his soldiers-cum-bodyguards, and Ram, the now husband of Sita, is forced to use the biological weapon Asurastra by Viswamitra, even though its use is forbidden by Lord Rudra. The Lankan army is defeated and Raavan escapes on his helicopter, Pushpak Viman but ends up unintentionally inflicting a life-crippling blow to his brother. He ends up shelving his plans of Kishkindha and Mithila and focuses more on Kumbha's health.

After 13 years of waiting, Raavan and Kumbha abduct Sita after the botched attempt by their half-siblings and for the very first time, they see Sita, the next Vishnu. They are horrified to discover that although Vedavati and Prithvi died, their daughter didn't. She grew up to be the adopted daughter of Janak, the King of Mithila.

It is then revealed that this was the exact reason why Vishwamitra chose Sita to be the next Vishnu- as he knew that Raavan couldn't get himself to kill someone who resembles a person whom he once so dearly loved. Vishwamitra learns about the kidnapping and is informed about Hanuman who has reached the site of the incident, now content with the fact that his old friend-turned-foe Sage Vashishtha has no other option other than to aid him in the war which is approaching.......

== Critical response ==
Acclaimed author and journalist Gautam Chikarmane praised the book in Open The Magazine, writing, "In Amish’s darkest work so far, Raavan captures this subtlety and takes you on a roller coaster of compassion and fury, love and rage, strategy and spontaneity.... Raavan is arguably the most complex villain in Indian literature, and Amish delivers one of the kind we have never met, re-imagining evil in ways we have not known.” Gautam also noted Amish's penchant for weaving in deep philosophies — "From the physical to the philosophical, the discourse between the two, both silent as well as verbal, is beautiful, gentle, calming" — into a good story — "We are wonderstruck at Amish’s craft of storytelling" — as he wrote, “Weaving familiar characters and their stories, he uses ancient time-space landscapes to deliver modern-day lessons. From independent India’s relentless contempt for wealth creation and the choking hold of bureaucracy on its people in general to the exploration of the recent Sabarimala controversy in particular, Amish continues with his bigger motive: to make India 'worthy of our ancestors once again'."

Tania Bhattacharya's review in The National (UAE) was positive. The review complimented the book as ”Racy and well-paced”, and said those qualities were "bound to make it a hit among fans and uninitiated readers alike.”
