= War of Lanka =

2022 novel by Amish Tripathi

War Of Lanka
- Cover art
- Author: Amish Tripathi
- Language: English
- Subject: Fantasy; mythology
- Genre: Fiction
- Publisher: HarperCollins
- Publication date: 3 October 2022
- Publication place: India
- Media type: Print (paperback, hardback)
- ISBN: 9356291527
- Preceded by: Raavan: Enemy of Aryavarta

The War of Lanka is the fourth book in the Ram Chandra Series by Amish Tripathi. The final installment in the author's retelling of the Ramayana, the book is set in 3400 BCE and focuses on the climactic battle between Ram and Raavan. The book was released on 3 October 2022 and published by HarperCollins India.

== Reception ==
Reeta Ramamurthy Gupta's gave 3.5/5 in her review in Forbesindia.com, saying “the book has a bit of everything. It's a re-imagination of an epic with several management lessons”.

== See also ==
- Asura: Tale of the Vanquished
- The Palace of Illusions
- The Liberation of Sita
