= Legend of Suheldev =

2020 novel by Amish Tripathi

Legend of Suheldev: The King Who Saved India
- Author: Amish Tripathi
- Language: English
- Genre: Historical fiction
- Publisher: Westland Publications
- Publication date: 20 June 2020
- Publication place: India
- Media type: Print (paperback, hardback)
- Pages: 325
- ISBN: 978-9387894037

Legend of Suheldev: The King Who Saved India is the eighth book by Amish Tripathi, and the first book from The Immortal Writers’ Centre. It was released on 20 June 2020 and is published by Westland Publications. It is based on the legendary Indian king Suheldev Pasi who defeated the army of Ghazi Saiyyad Salar Maqsud in the Battle of Bahraich. It was nominated for and won the Golden Book Award 2022.

== Plot ==
The story begins in 1025 CE when Mahmud of Ghazni sacks Somnath Temple and breaks the idol of Lord Shiva. The prince of Shravasti, Malladev, dies trying to save the temple. When his brother Suheldev learns of this, he is enraged and promises retaliation.

Together with his father King Mangaldhwaj, Suheldev goes to Kannauj to ask for King Ajitpal's help in countering Mahmud's further attacks. But instead, they are insulted and sent back. On their way back, they notice a Turkish camp and engage in a fight with them. They kill all of them and realise that the Turks can be beaten if taken by surprise. So, Suheldev decides to exile himself and attack the Turks by surprise while pretending to have rebelled against King Mangaldhwaj so that Mahmud doesn't attack Shravasti.

Years pass and by 1029, Suheldev becomes famous as the bandit prince and a thorn in the side of the Turks. During this time, he also loots Qasar Khan, a special envoy of Mahmud and the governor of Kannauj but treats his wife with respect and is kind to his six year old. After looting them, he lets them go. He also visits Bareilly and meets a Turk called Aslan who is a disciple of the Sufi saint Nuruddin Shaikh. Once a maulvi, Zayan, gets into a conflict with Nuruddin calling him a supporter of kafirs and Zayan's nephew attacks Nuruddin. In order to save Nuruddin, Aslan attacks Zayan's nephew, killing him in the process. Due to this, Nuruddin casts Aslan away as he hates bloodshed. Suheldev who was watching this befriends Aslan and invites him to join his team to which he agrees. He sometimes goes to spy on Turk soldiers for Suheldev as he himself is a Turk and understands Turkish.

In 1030, the Turks attack Delhi. The king of Delhi, Mahipal Tomar, is killed in the battle and the Turks win. After winning, the Turks kill all the soldiers and men in Delhi, not even sparing babies. Women are sold in slave markets. Everyone who was related to the king is killed so that there can be no claim to the throne except for two people — Jaichand, Mahipal's son-in-law and the ruler of Sirat who wasn't present in Delhi and the king's commander-in-chief Govardhan, whose father was the king's fifth cousin. Govardhan is saved because he retreats in time with a band of 30 soldiers.

Govardhan decides to go to Sirat for Jaichand's help but on the way, a woman tells him that Jaichand is a supporter of the Turks and he would hand him over to them and that was the reason why he didn't help Mahipal in the battle. The woman is later revealed to be Suheldev's spy and tells him the whereabouts of Suheldev and Govardhan joins his team.

Suheldev and his team go to villages attacked by the Turks. On one such visit, he goes to a village of leather workers which is destroyed by the Turks and all the people killed except a woman called Toshani who was saved because she was away when the Turks attacked. Toshani used to be a soldier in Kannauj army but deserted it when Kannauj surrendered to Mahmud of Ghazni. Toshani joins Suheldev's team. Suheldev later falls in love with Toshani.

In one of his attack on Turks, Suheldev is gravely injured and nearly succumbs to his wounds, but Aslan saves him. But, it turns out that Aslan was actually Mahmud's nephew, Salar Maqsud's twin brother Salar Masud, in disguise. He had disagreed with his fanatic brother and preferred a more peaceful, Sufi way of life. He wanted to protect India as it was the only land where all religions can co-exist peacefully and hence supported Suheldev against Ghazni. This is revealed only during the final war, as both Maqsud and Aslan have an identical face.

In the meantime, Mahmud dies of undisclosed reason and a civil war breaks out among his sons. As a result, all the Turk armies are called back and so is Maqsud as he was Mahmud's strongest commander-in-chief. Maqsud, as Aslan, tells the news of Mahmud's death to Suheldev saying Turks are not going to attack India for some years as they are into a civil war. He further tells him that he is not required in the mission for sometime as the Turks are gone and he is going to find some new Sufi master for himself. Thus, he leaves Suheldev and sets back to Ghazni in order to help Mahmud's rightful heir get the throne. In the meantime, Mangaldhwaj succumbs to cancer and Suheldev returns to his kingdom and ascends the throne. Before his death, Mangaldhwaj says that he had created a confederacy of 21 kings to repel any Turkic invasion and Suheldev leads it.

In 1033, the war of succession in Ghazni ends with Mas'ud I of Ghazni as the new sultan who killed his younger brother Muhammad of Ghazni to get the throne. After becoming the emperor, he sends Maqsud to India with a very large army to make it a part of the Ghaznavid Empire. As he enters northwest India, Suheldev sends his guru to Rajendra Chola for help. It is revealed that it was actually Rajendra Chola who ordered Mahmud's assassination to avenge the Somnath temple massacre. Rajendra Chola agrees to help Suheldev. As Maqsud advances, Ajitpal joins him with the Kannauj army. Maqsud also goes to Suheldev disguised as Aslan and learns of his war strategy. But, it's then revealed that Aslan was actually Maqsud's twin brother, Salar Masud, who supported Indians.

The battle day finally arrives. The Kannauj army refuses to fight for Maqsud and rebels but the army of Manohargarh joins Maqsud with its king, Jaichand.

Finally in 1034, a fierce battle is fought at Bahraich in which Suheldev kills Jaichand. Govardhan's hand is fractured, Abdul loses an eye, and Toshani is gravely injured. Suheldev is on the verge of losing but the Chola army arrives in time to save the day. Every single Turk in their army of 60000 is killed and their bodies burned for the Turks didn't fear death but feared cremation as they believed it stops one's entry to heaven. Salar Maqsud is captured and beheaded by Suheldev publicly. His body is burnt and its ashes are sent to Ghazni in an urn. His head is preserved and sent to Ghazni along with his ashes with a message inscribed on his forehead — "Come to India as devotees and our motherland will welcome you. But come as invaders and we will burn every single one of you."

After this incident, Somnath temple is reconstructed and no foreign invader dares to look at India for the next 150 years.

== Immortal Writers' Centre ==
Unlike his other books, this book isn't solely written by Amish, but is a collective effort of a team of writers. In an interview, Amish said that the team did the work of writing the body while he edited it and wrote the final draft.

== Marketing ==
Drop marketing technique was used with this book. Amish usually has a trend of revealing the title first, then the cover, then the trailer and finally, launch the book. This trend was broken with Legend of Suheldev as it was launched directly. Due to COVID-19 induced travel restrictions, Amish couldn't return to India from London so he decided to launch the book on Instagram Live from his house in London instead of organising an offline book launch event.

== Reception ==
Gautam Chikermane in his review in the Open Magazine said, "(Legend of Suheldev) is gripping from the first chapter and leaves you with a fulfilling climax as well as gasping for more at the last. I had to try hard to read it slowly, enjoy the atmosphere, the characters, the situations, the issues. But I failed: the pace Amish has set in his seventh novel is faster than the horses his heroes ride on."

Indic Today's review of Legend of Suheldev says, “Beyond everything, Amish has given us a new hero – from an era that is completely obliterated from modern history. That is cause for a celebration. Even more importantly, he has revived, rather re-established the genre of nationalistic historical fiction in Indian English writing. Its relevance today cannot be understated. In that sense, he is the true descendant of a pantheon of such writers who wrote in Indian languages for 150 years. In that sense, we also have a new hero, an author in a language and genre, that we have missed in the last 70 years – thanks to ideologues assuming the role of gatekeepers of narratives.”

The Daily Guardian's review of the Legend of Suheldev says, " With Suheldev, Amish is trying to create an ecosystem of writers who can work with him to resuscitate some of the long-forgotten heroes from the pages of Indian history."

Reya Mehrotra of Financial Express was positive in her review saying,"Amish, in fact, effortlessly paints a picture of every character he introduces in the reader's mind with minute and detailed description of their traits and characteristics...The forgotten story brings about notions relevant today and those that need re-thinking – class, caste and national consciousness. Though the Battle of Bahraich might have ended a millennium ago, the battle of casteism, racism, religious bias, classicism continues and Amish's message is clear, as he echoes through Mangaldhwaj's voice, “Divided, we will continue to fall”."

== Adaption ==
Legend of Suheldev: The King Who Saved India is being adapted into an eponymous film directed by Senthil Kumar and produced by Wakaoo Films, Casa Media, and Immortal Studios.
