= Sita: Warrior of Mithila =

2017 novel by Amish Tripathi

- Author: Amish Tripathi
- Cover artist: Sideways, Arthat Studio
- Language: English
- Subject: Fantasy; Epic
- Genre: Fantasy
- Publisher: Westland Press
- Publication date: 29 May 2017
- Publication place: India
- Media type: Paperback
- ISBN: 978-93-86224-58-3
- Preceded by: Scion of Ikshvaku
- Followed by: Raavan: Enemy of Aryavarta

Sita: Warrior of Mithila is the fifth book of Amish Tripathi, fifth book of Amishverse, and second book of Ram Chandra Series. It was released on 29 May 2017. Ram Chandra Series is a retelling of the most famous epic of India, the Ramayana. Each book in the series focuses on one important character of the Ramayana. Sita: Warrior of Mithila focuses on the story of Sita.

== Plot synopsis ==
During a trip, Janak (the king of Mithila) and his wife, Sunaina, find a child on the road, being protected by a vulture. They adopt the child and name her Sita, for she was found in a furrow. As an adolescent, Sita is sent to the ashram of Rishi Shvetaketu for her studies. There she learns about martial arts and gains knowledge on different subjects. She also makes friendship with a girl, Radhika, and her cousin Hanuman, who was a Vayuputra—the tribe left by the previous Mahadev, Lord Rudra. He is also a Naga whose appearance looks like the head of a monkey placed on a human body. When Sita is 14 years old, Maharishi Vishvamitra—head of the Malayaputra tribe who serve the next Vishnu—visits Shvetaketu's ashram. Impressed by Sita's skills and knowledge (and a strange connection which he remembers due to the sound of a hill myna), he elects her as the seventh Vishnu but asks her to keep it a secret. Sita also wins the trust of Jatayu, a Naga member of the Malayaputras.

After Sita returns to Mithila, she is bereaved upon her mother Sunaina's death. She also has to take care of her younger sister Urmila. With Janak being engrossed in spiritual work, Sita is made the prime minister of Mithila. She is able and makes many reforms in the kingdom with the help of her childhood friend Samichi, who served as the chief of the police force. After Mithila's financial condition stabilized, Sita visited the Malayaputra capital city of Agastyakootam to continue training for becoming the next Vishnu. However, she starts suspecting Vishwamitra's reasoning for choosing her over Rama, the prince of Ayodhya and the son of the king Dashrath (the supreme ruler of India). Through Radhika she learned that Ram was also being considered for becoming the next Vishnu by his mentor Rishi Vashistha. Sita plans a marriage alliance with Ram through a swayamvar, but is enraged to learn that the Lankan king Raavan and his brother Kumbhakaran have also come there. She manipulates the situation with Vishwamitra so that Ram's name is announced as the first suitor. Ram wins the Swayamvar and marries Sita, while his brother Lakshman marries Urmila. The next day, Raavan besieges Mithila with 10,000 soldiers, and Ram is forced to use the biological weapon Asurastra by Viswamitra who emotionally blackmails Ram, even though its usage is forbidden by Lord Rudra. The Lankan army is defeated and Raavan escapes on his aerial vehicle, Pushpak Viman. Ram returns to Ayodhya and decides to take a 14-year exile as punishment for breaking Lord Rudra's rule. Sita holds a grudge against Vishwamitra for forcing Ram to use the weapon and never speaks to him. Together with Lakshman she joins Ram on the exile, but enlists help from Jatayu and his men, to protect Ram and supply the trio with the anti-ageing drink, Somras.

Numerous incidents occur during their exile and thirteen years pass by. One day, with Ram and Lakshman out hunting, the camp is attacked by Raavan and his soldiers. Sita rushes to help a wounded Jatayu but loses the fight against so many soldiers. She is abducted and carried unconscious into the Pushpak Viman. Once she regains conscious she attempts to kill Raavan in the vehicle but is stopped by a woman drawing a blade to her throat. With Raavan being alerted, Sita turns back and, in a twist, is startled to see that it is Samichi, revealing that she has been a traitor all along.

== Development ==
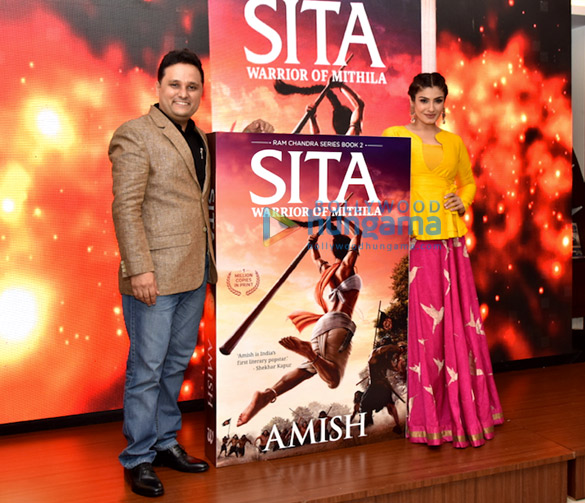
Actress Raveena Tandon launches the book cover, with Tripathi on her right

The book is based on Sita, the legendary Indian queen regarded as an incarnation of Lakshmi. The title was revealed by the author at his Facebook Page. The story begins with King Janak of Mithila finding a girl child abandoned in a field. She is mysteriously guarded by a vulture from a pack of wolves. King Janak adopts her but he had not wondered that this orphan girl will be the one needed for the protection of the divine land of India from the demon-like desires of King Raavan. It follows through Sita's childhood and tutelage, her marriage with Ram, and ultimately her 14-year exile, accompanied by her husband Ram and his brother Lakshman. According to a survey conducted by Landmark Bookstores, the book as deemed as the most anticipated book of 2017 with 36.85% of the participants of the survey inclined to buy it.

== Critical response ==
Gayatri Jayaraman's review in News18.com was positive in her review of the book, saying "Sita: Warrior of Mithila is not so much a book about a spouse of a Lord past, as much as an inquiry into the feminine principle of statesmanship... It would be a crying shame to dismiss this as just another work of mythological fiction. It is transformatively so much more."

Rosheena Zehra's review of Sita: Warrior of Mithila in Thequint.com says, Reviewing a writer like Amish is always a challenge. It is easier to write off trashy books, but admiration takes time. Praise demands investment of thought, or so I conclude from personal experience. With this book, Amish has given us a Sita who is fielding armies single-handedly, is a champion archer, an efficient queen, and an able administrator. Additionally, it is refreshing to find a female protagonist in mainstream art whose physical appearance is not prioritised in her portrayal. Amish's book talks about philosophy, uses proper grammar and yet appeals to readers.
