= Ikshvaku (disambiguation) =

Ikshvaku is a mythological king appearing in ancient Indian literature as the founder of the Ikshvaku dynasty.

Ikshvaku may also refer to:

- Ikshvaku dynasty, the ruling dynasty of ancient Kosala in ancient India
- Rishabhanatha, the first Jain Tirthankara (enlightened reformer) in the current avsarpini (cosmological cycle of Jainism), also known and identified as Ikshvaku
- Andhra Ikshvaku, an early ruling dynasty of Andhra Pradesh
- Scion of Ikshvaku, a fantasy book written by Indian author Amish Tripathi
