= Scion of Ikshvaku =

2015 novel by Amish Tripathi

Ram: Scion of Ikshvaku
- The cover art for Scion of Ikshvaku
- Author: Amish Tripathi
- Cover artist: Think Why Not
- Language: English
- Subject: Fantasy; mythology
- Genre: Fiction
- Publisher: Westland Press
- Publication date: 22 June 2015
- Publication place: India
- Media type: Hardcover; Paperback
- ISBN: 978-93-85152-14-6
- Followed by: Sita: Warrior of Mithila

Ram: Scion of Ikshvaku is a one to one replica of the events taking place before the epic tale "Ramayana" and also the fourth book of Amish Tripathi, fourth book of Amishverse, and first book of Ram Chandra Series. It was released on 22 June 2015. It is based on Ram, the legendary Indian king regarded as an incarnation of Vishnu. The title was revealed by the author at the Jaipur Literature Festival. The story begins with King Dashrath of Ayodhya being defeated in a war by Lankan trader Raavan, and the birth of his son Ram. It follows through Ram's childhood and tutelage, along with the politics surrounding his ascension to the throne, and ultimately his 14-year exile, accompanied by wife Sita and brother Lakshman.

== Plot synopsis ==
Ram and his half-brothers, Bharat (son of Kaikeyi), Lakshman and Shatrughan (twin sons of Dashrath's second wife Sumitra), are sent to live at the hermitage of Sage Vashistha. Under his tutelage, Ram becomes a skilled warrior, and gains knowledge about India's predicament and how one should resolve it. After his education is completed, Ram is given the job of maintaining law and police in Ayodhya, in which he considerably excels. One day Roshni, daughter of the wealthy trader Manthara and sister-like to the four brothers, is gang raped and murdered. The culprits are all executed except one, Dhenuka, who is underage. A strict follower of the law, Ram is forced to imprison the boy although others request him for Dhenuka's execution. Manthara bribes Kaikeyi into influencing Bharat, who secretly murders Dhenuka, much to Ram's chagrin.

In the meantime Dashrath's attitude towards Ram changes and he names Ram as the crown prince. Shortly afterwards, Ram and Lakshman help sage Vishwamitra—head of the Malayaputra tribe who serve the next Vishnu—to stop the Asura attacks on his hermitage. Ram convinces the Asuras to go to Pariha, the land of Lord Rudra, the previous Mahadev. It is during this trip that Ram learns from his half-brother Lakshman about his anointment as the next Vishnu by Sage Vashishtha. Next they travel to the remote kingdom of Mithila, where Ram meets princess Sita, the adopted daughter of King Janak. Like Ram, Sita also strongly believes in following laws, thus earning Ram's respect and love. During a Swayamvar for Sita, Raavan and his brother Kumbhakarna arrive, but storm out when Viswamitra announces Ram's name as the first suitor. Ram wins the Swayamvar and marries Sita, while Lakshman marries Janak's biological daughter, Urmila.

The next day, Raavan besieges Mithila with 10,000 of his soldiers, and Ram is forced to use the biological weapon Asurastra by Vishwamitra, even though its usage is forbidden and not authorized by the Vayuputras, Lord Rudra's tribe. The Lankan army is defeated and Raavan escapes on his helicopter, Pushpak Vimaan. Ram returns to Ayodhya and decides to take a 14-year exile as punishment for breaking Rudra's rule about the weapon. A begrudged Manthara asks Kaikeyi to substantiate the matter by using two boons given to her by Dashrath for saving his life. Thus Ram undertakes the exile with Sita and Lakshman. After Dashrath's death, Bharat declares Ram as King of Ayodhya and decides to rule the kingdom as regent. Sita makes a secret deal with the vulture-like Naga Jatayu and his men, to protect Ram and supply the trio with the anti-ageing drink, Somras.

Thirteen years pass and one day, Ram's camp is approached by Raavan's siblings, Vibhishan and Shurpanakha, who seek refuge from their tyrannical brother. Ram is skeptical but accepts them as guests. One day, Shurpanakha attempts to drown Sita, but the latter overpowers her and in the ensuing scuffle, Lakshman instinctively cuts Shurpanakha's nose. Ram and his group flee from there fearing Raavan's retribution. One day, Ram and Lakshman return home from hunting and are shocked to find Jatayu and his men slain. Before dying, Jatayu tells Ram that Raavan has kidnapped Sita. Ram looks up to see the Pushpak Viman flying away and is filled with rage.

== Development ==
From 2010 to 2013, author Amish Tripathi released the three books in his fictional Shiva trilogy—The Immortals of Meluha, The Secret of the Nagas and The Oath of the Vayuputras—inspired by the Hindu deity Shiva. The releases became a critical and commercial success, with reviewers crediting Tripathi for his innovative marketing strategy in promotion of the books, which included video trailers associated with high-profile film releases, retail chain distributions as well as a music album inspired by the series, called Vayuputras. As of June 2015, 2.5 million copies of the Shiva Trilogy have been sold with gross retail sales of over ₹60 crore (US$6.2 million), making it the fastest selling book series in the history of Indian publishing. Tripathi's publisher Westland Press paid him advance amount of ₹5 crore (US$520,000) for the next series that he would write. Gautam Padmanabhan, CEO of Westland clarified that the advance included the book, audio and e-publishing rights for series. The deal was for the South-Asian region and was the largest advance ever paid to an Indian author. Anuj Bahri, who was the first publisher for The Immortals of Meluha, said that the deal could go up to US$4 million once they acquired the film, foreign and translation rights for the books.

"I would like to look at him holistically and completely. Practically all Indians love and respect him for what is known as 'Rama Rajya', but I wonder how many people would have actually thought through what 'Rama Rajya' is. That is the thing I want to write about and how he built that society... Through Lord Ram, we might learn that it is cool to follow rules. And that is something I think modern Indians might need to learn."

— Tripathi talking about the story's background

In January 2015, Tripathi revealed at the Jaipur Literature Festival that his next series would be based on Rama, the legendary Indian king regarded as an incarnation of Vishnu. He explained that at the 2013 version of the festival, a reader had asked him why people use the moniker "Lord" while naming Rama, which led to Tripathi thinking about developing a series. The author wrote about the incident in an article in the Hindustan Times also. He became curious as to how the battle between Rama and Ravana, explained in the Ramayana, unfolded and analyzed on Rama's treatment of his wife Sita. "The question [about the Lord moniker] deeply upset me... I agree how he treated Sita was unfair, but that was one aspect of his personality," added Tripathi. He also wanted to highlight on the negative impression of Rama, and the term "Maryada Purush" associated with the king. "People erroneously translate this as 'the perfect man' when it actually means 'the perfect follower of rules'. [It is true of a lot of people who were] brilliant for society, but not for their personal lives. If we can look at Gautama Buddha and Mahatma Gandhi in their entirety, why not Lord Ram?", he concluded.

Although unsure as to whether there will be four or five books in the series, Tripathi declared that the first book was named as Scion of Ikshvaku. Ikshvaku was the founder of the Suryavamsha dynasty, to which Rama belonged, and the book deals with how Rama tried to establish his "Rama Rajya [The Kingdom of Rama]" in the middle of a corrupt Indian society. The story takes place at around 3400 BC, before the Shiva trilogy plotline, the latter having clues about the Rama Chandra series. Like the Shiva trilogy, Scion of Ikshvaku will have philosophy as one of its themes, drawing from Tripathi's understanding of Indian scriptures. The author worked over a year on the series but he did not have to research about the subject, since being born into a religious family (Tripathi's father was a pandit) he was aware of the stories about Rama; he took further inspirations from Valmiki's Ramayana, the Ramcharitmanas, Kamba Ramayanam as well as the Adbhuta Ramayana.

Tripathi wrote the story both from a critical point of view about Rama as well as a devotee of him, adding that "part of our traditions is also to learn from the stories of our gods". He also confirmed a part of the plot, where Ravana wins a war in the story and enforces a trade deal which results in the Sapta Sindhu area to give economic privileges to Lanka. Like the characterization of women in the Shiva trilogy, Tripathi had strong female perspective in Scion of Ikshvaku, including portraying Manthara as a businesswoman. This was a deviation from the original story, where she was a servant. Other concepts explored included the rise and fall of masculine and feminine centric civilisations, as well as using scientific evidence for making the character of Hanuman from the epic as a Naga, a concept introduced in the Shiva trilogy.

== Marketing and release ==
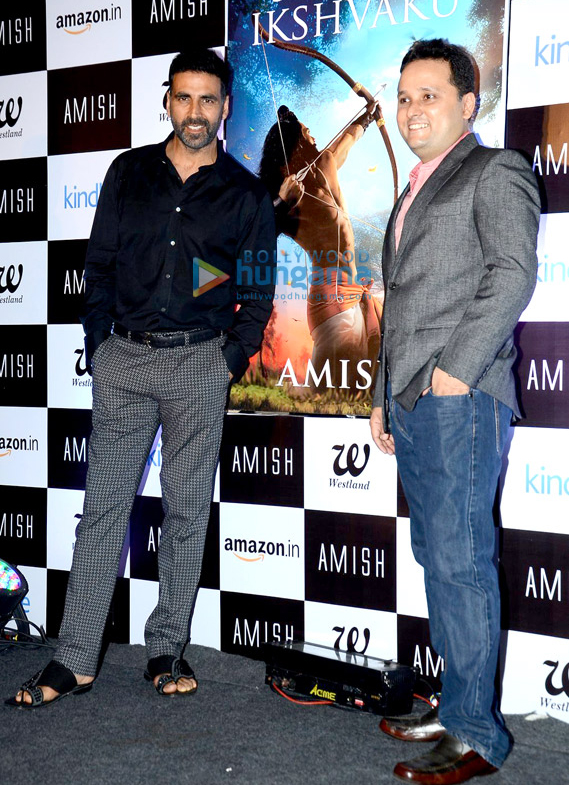
Actor Akshay Kumar and author Amish Tripathi at the release of the cover for Scion of Ikshvaku.

Westland had run a social media contest prior to the revealing of the name, with hashtags like #WhatNextAmish" and #MysteryBoxes, containing clues to the subject of the book. A trailer was released on YouTube for the book, which also included a Sanskrit hymn for "Rama Rajya". The cover art was released on 27 March 2015 at a press conference in Mumbai, unveiled by Bollywood actor Akshay Kumar and Padmanabhan. Creative agency Think Why Not developed the book cover, which depicted Rama, shooting with a bow and an arrow towards Ravana, the latter on his legendary Pushpak Vimana.

Like the cover artworks for the Shiva trilogy, the Scion of Ikshvaku cover also had numerous Hieroglyph symbology alongside the main image, to aid readers in deciphering key parts of the story. The author added the symbols as an addendum, basing them on the still undeciphered Indus Valley letters and made them represent how Rama would have been written in the script. Tripathi believed that the imagery had to "maintain the high standards of visual appeal that we have set with my earlier book covers. Many of these symbols on the cover and through the books are clues to my stories for those well-versed with Indian scriptures." Release date for the book was revealed as 22 June 2015, with pre-orders starting after the cover was unveiled, including the Hindi version titled Ikshvaku ke Vanshaj.

In April 2015, retail website Amazon.com started promoting the book using their existing relationship with the 2015 Indian Premier League (IPL), in-between the cricket matches. The author explained that the core demographic of his book and the IPL was same, hence Amazon.com chose to promote the book there. It was the first time that a book was advertised during the tournament. Westland also set up a Twitter chat where director Karan Johar interviewed Tripathi, and ultimately released the official trailer for the book to YouTube. The trailer starts off with a coin spinning on a map, spelling out the word "Ayodhya", followed by interspersed scenes of a man chasing someone in a forest, a lady fighting off a group of soldiers, a meteor as well as arrows falling from the sky, and a helicopter like structure flying in the air.

Tripathi also released the third chapter of the book on Amazon Kindle for the readers, holding a reading and discussion session also. The release was presided over by actress Gul Panag who shared the same alma mater with the writer. Samir Kumar, Director of Category Management at Amazon.in believed that launching the book through their platform helped the company reach out a larger set of customers, based on the success of Tripathi's previous release. On the release day, Amazon planned midnight delivery of the book to some of the customers, with Tripathi himself being present to deliver it; he had instantly agreed to the idea making the delivered books a collector's edition with his signature. Customers in Mumbai, Bangalore and Delhi were part of this delivery process, with zero shipping costs from the company.

== Commercial reception ==
According to Amazon.com, they received pre-orders for the book from different sections of India, indicating the continued interest in Tripathi's releases. Pre-orders for the book made it shoot to the top of the charts, and it was noted that the book aimed to oversell the whole of the Shiva trilogy combined. Arunava Sinha from Scroll.in noted that "The entire number of pre-orders usually shows up on the charts the very first week, which is why the campaign to get those pre-orders is now the primary target of pre-launch marketing activities for potential blockbusters. What really matters, though, is what will follow in weeks 2 through 20."

Controversy erupted when Westland filed a case against online retailer Flipkart, alleging that the company had violated IT Act by selling the book on their website, since they had signed an exclusive deal with Amazon. The case was sub judice under the Delhi High Court, and they declined to pass a restraint order on the sales of the book at Flipkart. Instead they asked the company to provide their responses by 4 August 2015. Rasul Ballay from The Economic Times commented that "by when the importance of the controversy would have diluted as most number of copies of an eagerly awaited book like this are generally sold within a month of its launch."

== Critical response ==
Urmi Chanda-Vaz writes in scroll.in: "He has an almost magical ability of retaining the essence of familiar mythological tales while spinning wildly deviant plots...While not a great fan of his literary style, I cannot help but admire Amish for the way he manages to create completely new stories from old ones...for anyone who is familiar with the author's previous works, the book meets all expectations, for Amish bends it better than Beckham... Amish's easy-to-read prose and page-turning style is designed to be accessible and enjoyable. From the looks of it, he is poised to set another best-selling record."

Sandipan Deb writes in LiveMint: "You can read Ikshvaku either way—as the start of what I hope will be a thrilling series that will bring Ram and Sita closer to a lot of Indians, or as an honest analysis and a very intelligent man’s musings on everything from Manu Smriti to Milton Friedman, all presented in the garb of a series of adventure novels... This is what makes Amish very special among the few Indian bestselling authors we have."

Ivinder Gill of Financial Express commented that 'The Scion of Ikshvaku is what could be called a modern take on the Ramayan, with Amish taking the familiar story further, or sideways, with his own interpretation of events. The proverbial poetic licence has been used to maximum limit, as we discover a ladies man in Bharat or a lathi-wielding Sita.' Sanjeev Sanyal writes in Daily O: "In the new series, the author explores the importance of the rule of law... In my view, Amish does well to take the modern reader back to the original philosophical conundrums, especially when he explicitly puts these debates in a modern context... Overall, Scion of Ikshvaku is a fast-paced, action-packed retelling of the Ramayana... I look forward to the next volume in the series."

The review in the New Indian Express says, "Given the intimidating expectations riding on it, the first novel in Amish’s Ram Chandra series, Scion of Ikshvaku, does not disappoint. Like the Shiva trilogy, this again is not a retelling, but rather a complete re-imagining of the original story using the same characters but with fresh perspectives and modern sensibilities." At the 14th Crossword Book Award held in November 2016, the book won the category of Best Fiction book.
