= P. Lalita Kumari =

Telugu poet and writer known for her feminist perspective

- Born: 27 November 1950 (age 75); Guntur, Andhra Pradesh, India
- Occupations: Writer, scriptwriter, lecturer
- Writing career
- Pen name: Volga
- Years active: 1986–present
- Genre: Feminist
- Notable works: Vimukta (The Liberation of Sita), Sweccha

Popuri Lalita Kumari, popularly known by her pen name Volga, is a Telugu poet and writer well known for her feminist perspective. She won the prestigious Sahitya Akademi Award in 2015 for her short story compilation 'Vimukta Kadha Samputi' in Telugu. Along with being a writer, she has also been a professor and head of scripting division in Tollywood. Her work initiated debates across the country about feminism, in times when the idea was hardly accepted. The Library of Congress has a collection of her most popular published works, including the English translations of selected short stories.

== Early life and education ==
Volga was born in Guntur on 27 November 1950. She completed her MA in Telugu literature from Andhra University in 1972.

== Career ==
Volga after her MA joined as a Telugu professor at VSR & NVR College, Tenali between the period 1973 to 1986. Later, she worked in scripting division as a senior executive at Ushakiran Movies during 1986–1995. She later in 1991 joined Asmita Resource Centre for Women, a Telangana-based NGO which addresses women's issues, as its President and presently serving as the Chairman of the organization. She is also the member of the publication, Vamtinti Masi (Soot from the Kitchen), an editorial of Asimita Organization, which is an active member of Telugu Advisory council for National Book Trust of India.

=== Author ===
Volga had chosen her pseudonym because it was both the name of her deceased elder sister and the Volga river, which according to her was the 'perfect mix of the personal and political' because of her self-described 'Leftist leanings'. Volga is known for her feminist literary works. Her novels, articles, poems portray women with modern, progressive ideologies. She while keeping the quality of work maintains the reality of characters, intact. All of her novels were written while she was a full-time employee, rather than fully dedicating her time to the novels. She published her first novel, Sahaja in 1986. The novel was a debatable topic among the newspaper columns. The immediate next year, 1987, her second novel Sveccha was published. These two novels speak how marriage binds a woman and shackles her freedom.

== Literary works ==
Lalita Kumari has penned and translated around 50 publications. The most popular ones are listed below:

Year	Name	Type of work	Notes
1983	Athadu, Aame, Manam	Literary Criticism	A review of a novel by Uppala Lakshmana Rao on nationalist struggle
1984	Agnes Smedley's Stories	Translation to Telugu	
1985	Daughter of Earth	Translation to Telugu	
1986	Sahaja	Novel	
1987	Sweccha	Novel	
1988	Kanneeti Kerataala Vennela	Novel	
1989	Three Generations	Translation to Telugu	Short story by Alexandra Kollontai
1989	Maanavi	Novel	
1989	Maku Godalu Levu	Edited Work	Collection of essays
1990	Letter to a Child Never Born	Translation to Telugu	Novel by Oriana Fallaci
1990	Aakasamlo Sagam	Novel	
1992	Rajakiya Kathalu	Short story collection	
1993	Gulabeelu	Novel	
1993	Neeli Meghalu	Edited Work	
1993	Neeli Meghalu	Edited Work	
1994	Nurella Chalam	Edited Work	Critical essays on the works of Chalam, whose centenary was celebrated in 1994
1994	Saramsam	Co-edited work	A report about the struggle of the women in Andhra Pradesh against liquor.
1994	Widows	Translation to Telugu	Novel by Ariel Dorfman
1995	Sarihaddulu Leni Samdhyalu	Co-edited work	Collection of essays
1995	Prayogam	Short story collection	
1995	Vallu Aaruguru	Play	
2001	Charitra Swaralu	Play	
Not known	Woman at Point Zero	Translation to Telugu	Arabic novel by Nawal El Saadawi
2016	The Liberation of Sita	Novel	

Lalita Kumari wrote articles that were published in journals and newspapers, mostly regarding feminism. She became the first person to introduce western feminists, Feminist Movement, First-Wave Feminism and Second Wave Feminism to Telugu readership.

== Awards and honors ==
Year	Title	Category	Notes
1987	Sweccha	Best Novel Award	
1990	Aakasamlo Sagam	Best Novel Award	
1993	Sweccha	Award in recognition for effort in women's causes	
1998	Todu	Nandi Award (Best Story Writer)	Awarded by the Government of Andhra Pradesh
1999	NA	Best Woman Writer	Awarded by Telugu University
2009	NA	Suseela Narayana Reddy Award	
2013	NA	Kandukuri Veerasalingam Literary Award	
2014	NA	Lok Nayak Foundation Award	
2015	Vimuktha	Sahitya Akademi Award	
