= List of lakes of Uttar Pradesh =

Uttar Pradesh, situated in northern India, spans an area of 243,286 square kilometers. With a population of approximately 240 million people, it holds the distinction of being the most populous state in India. The state boasts over 15 major lakes, This is a list of lakes of the Indian state of Uttar Pradesh.

Lake	Location
Barua Sagar Tal	Jhansi
Chittaura Jheel	Bahraich
Moti Jheel	Kanpur
Keetham Lake	Agra
Raja Ka Tal	Mahoba district
Ramgarh Tal Lake	Gorakhpur
Surha Tal	Ballia
Gobind Vallabh Pant Sagar	Sonbhadra district
Ramgarhtaal and Chiluataal	Gorakhpur
Bakhira Jheel	Sant Kabir Nagar
Karela and Etauja Jheel	Lucknow
Madan Sagar Lake	Mahoba
Liloor Jheel	Bareli
Bharatkund	Ayodhya
Gujjar Tal	Jaunpur

== Gallery ==
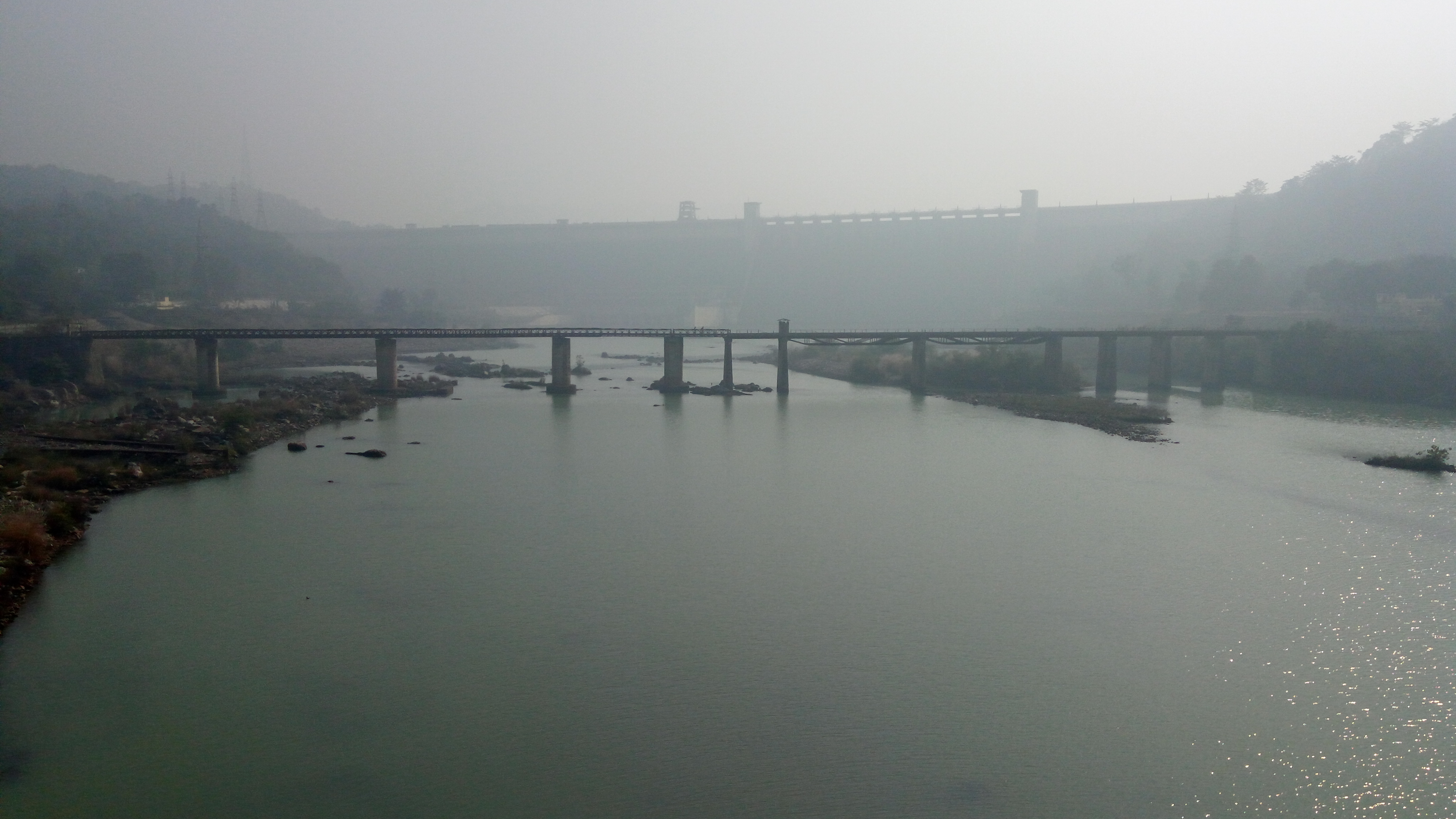
Gobind Vallabh Pant Sagar front view
