= Moti Jheel =

Lake and reservoir in Kanpur, Uttar Pradesh, India

- Location within Uttar Pradesh
- Location: Kanpur
- Coordinates: 26.4761°N 80.314055°E
- Lake type: artificial lake
- Basin countries: India
- Max. length: 600 m (2,000 ft)
- Max. width: 105 m (344 ft)
- Max. depth: 32 ft (9.8 m)
- Surface elevation: 130 ft (40 m)
- Settlements: Kanpur and Kalyanpur

Moti Jheel is a lake and drinking water reservoir in the Benajhabar area of Kanpur, which together with its adjoining gardens and children's park is an important tourist attraction. Built during the British Raj, today along with Kamala Retreat and Moti Park, it is an important recreational place in the bustling industrial city of Kanpur, once known as the "Manchester of the East".

Moti means pearl and jheel means lake, thus giving its name Pearl Lake. The park is often referred to as the 'Lungs of Kanpur'.

== History ==
The rectangular lake was originally developed during the British Raj, as a drinking water reservoir of the Kanpur Waterworks, and called Septic Tank. Later, as an important urban planning measure by the city administration, it was developed as a public place and a recreational area, with a landscaped garden and a children's park.

It is flanked on one side by the campus of Lala Lajpat Rai Hospital and on the other several important Kanpur Municipal Corporation (Kanpur Municipal Corporation) buildings are situated, as is the Kanpur Development Authority (KDA)'s water treatment plant.

== Major spots ==
Offices

- Kanpur Municipal Corporation Town Hall
- Kanpur Development Authority

Entertainment Place

- Lajpat Bhawan
- Lake
- Amusement Park
- Gardens
- Japanese Garden
- Seasonal Fairs and Festivals

== Connectivity ==
One can catch city buses to various routes of the city from Moti Jheel Bus Stop situated on Mall Road. The nearest railway station is at Rawatpur while the nearest major railhead is Kanpur Central which is around 10 kilometres from Moti Jheel. Kanpur Airport is the nearest domestic airport.

== See also ==
- List of lakes of Uttar Pradesh
- List of lakes in India
