= Salar Sahu =

Gazi and a commander in the army of Sultan Mahmud Ghaznavi (died 1032)

Ghazi Syed Salar Sahu
- غازى سيد سالار ساھو
- Died: 4 October 1032; Satrikh, Uttar Pradesh, India
- Burial place: Satrikh
- Spouse: Sitr-i-Mu'alla (purportedly)
- Relatives: Salar Mas'ud (son)
Budhe Baba ki mazar
- Grand Master's Mausoleum
Location
- Location: Satrikh, Uttar Pradesh

Ghazi Syed Salar Sahu, also known as Syed Salar Daud, Sahu Bin Ataullah Alavi or Salar Sahu (Persian: غازى سيد سالار ساھو), was a ghazi and a commander in the army of Sultan Mahmud Ghaznavi associated with Ghaznavid campaigns in India in the early 11th century.

Salar Sahu was a descendant of Muhammad ibn al-Hanafiyyah, son of Ali. His father's name was Tahir Ataullah, and his son was Salar Mas'ud. He had two brothers one of them was Syed Maroofuddin Ghazi. He was probably a brother-in-law of Sultan Mahmud Ghaznavi, purportedly married to the latter's sister, Sitr-i-Mu'alla. He came to India along with Sultan Mahmud Ghaznavi as his army commander.

He died on 4 October 1032 at Satrikh and is buried there.

== Tomb of Syed Salar Sahu ==
The mausoleum of Salar Sahu is situated in Satrikh, 8 kilometres (5.0 mi) away from Barabanki, in Uttar Pradesh. At his grave the people gather to pilgrimage during the full moon of the Hindu month of Jyeshta during the summer. There is a five-day-long urs during which thousands of devotees pray. His tomb is known as "Budhe Baba ki mazar" (Grand Master's Mausoleum).
