= Manthara =

Character in the Hindu epic Ramayana

- Ramayana character
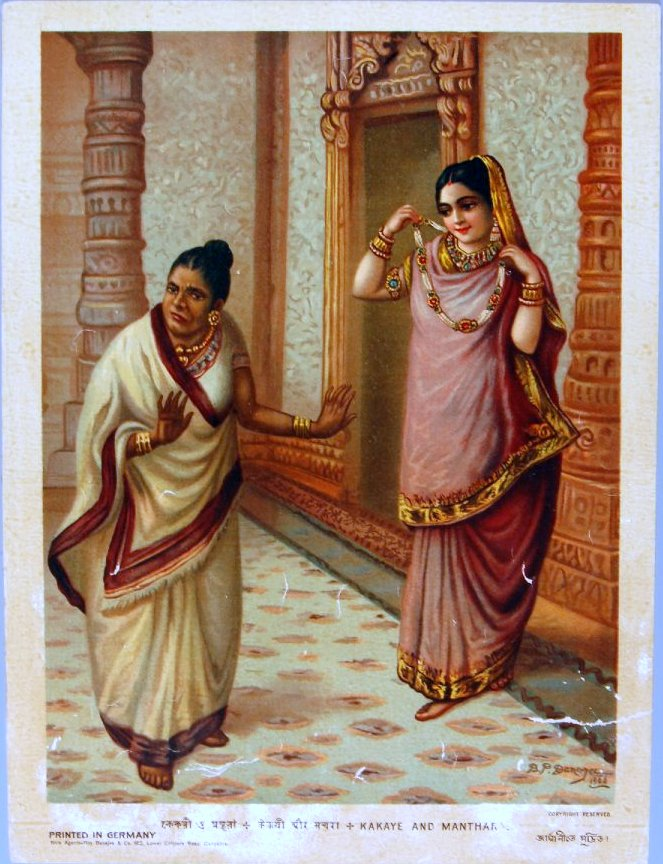
- Painting of Manthara (left) with Kaikeyi

In-universe information
- Gender: Female
- Occupation: Servant

Manthara (Sanskrit: मन्थरा; lit: "humpbacked") is a character in the Hindu epic Ramayana. In the epic, she is described to have convinced Queen Kaikeyi that the throne of Ayodhya belonged to her son Bharata and that her step-son—crown-prince Rama (the protagonist of the Ramayana)—should be exiled from the kingdom. She is portrayed as a mother-figure to Kaikeyi and her twin Yudhajit, following the banishment of their mother. She accompanied Kaikeyi to Ayodhya after her marriage to Dasharatha.

== Influence on Kaikeyi ==
As family servant of Kaikeyi, Manthara lived with her from the time of her birth. When she hears that King Dasharatha is planning to make his eldest son, Rama, prince regent (rather than Bharata, his child by Kaikeyi), she flies into a rage and reports the news to Kaikeyi. Kaikeyi is initially pleased and hands Manthara a pearl necklace.

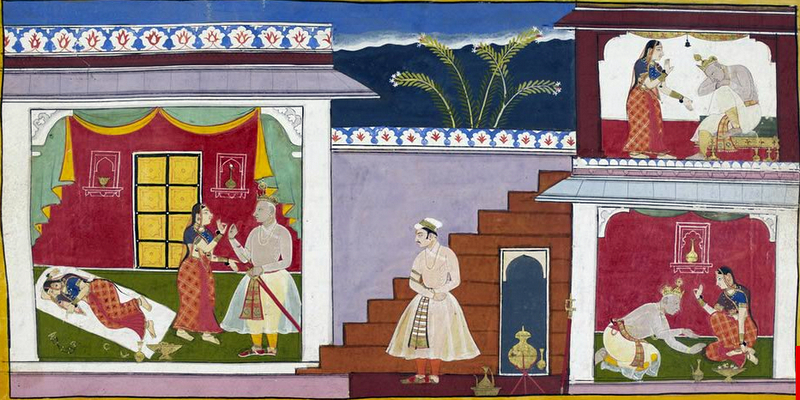
Dasharatha promises to banish Rama per Kaikeyi's wishes. A folio from Ayodhya Kand manuscript

Manthara reminds Kaikeyi of the two boons Dasharatha had given her when she had once saved his life in a celestial battle. Kaikeyi had kept these boons for later and Manthara declares that this is the right time to ask for them. She advises Kaikeyi to lie in her room wearing soiled clothes and no ornaments. She should weep and cry, pretending anger. When Dasharatha would come to console her, she should immediately ask for the boons. The first boon would be that Bharata would be made the king. The second boon would be that Rama should be sent into the forest for exile for fourteen years. Manthara reckons that the fourteen-year banishment would be long enough for Bharata to consolidate his position in the Empire and weave his way into people's hearts.

== Rebuked by Shatrughna ==
Manthara appears only once in the Ramayana after Rama's banishment. Having been rewarded by Kaikeyi with costly clothing and jewels, she is walking in the palace gardens when Bharata and his half-brother Shatrughna come upon her. Seeing her, Shatrughna flies into a violent rage over Rama's banishment and assaults her murderously. Kaikeyi begs Bharata to save her, telling Shatrughna that it is a sin to kill a woman and that Rama would be furious with them both if he does such a thing. He relents and the brothers leave, while Kaikeyi attempts to comfort Manthara.

== After Rama's coronation ==
When Rama came to Ayodhya with Sita and Lakshmana after 14 years of exile, Rama was made the king of Ayodhya. After coronation of Rama, Rama and Sita gifted jewels and clothes to their servants. Then, Rama asked Kaikeyi that where is Manthara. Then, Kaikeyi is told that Manthara is very sorry for her act and for 14 years she has been waiting for Rama to apologize to him. Rama went to a dark room where Manthara was lying on the floor. Seeing Lakshmana, Sita and Rama, she apologized for her treachery and Rama forgave her.

== Appearance in other versions ==
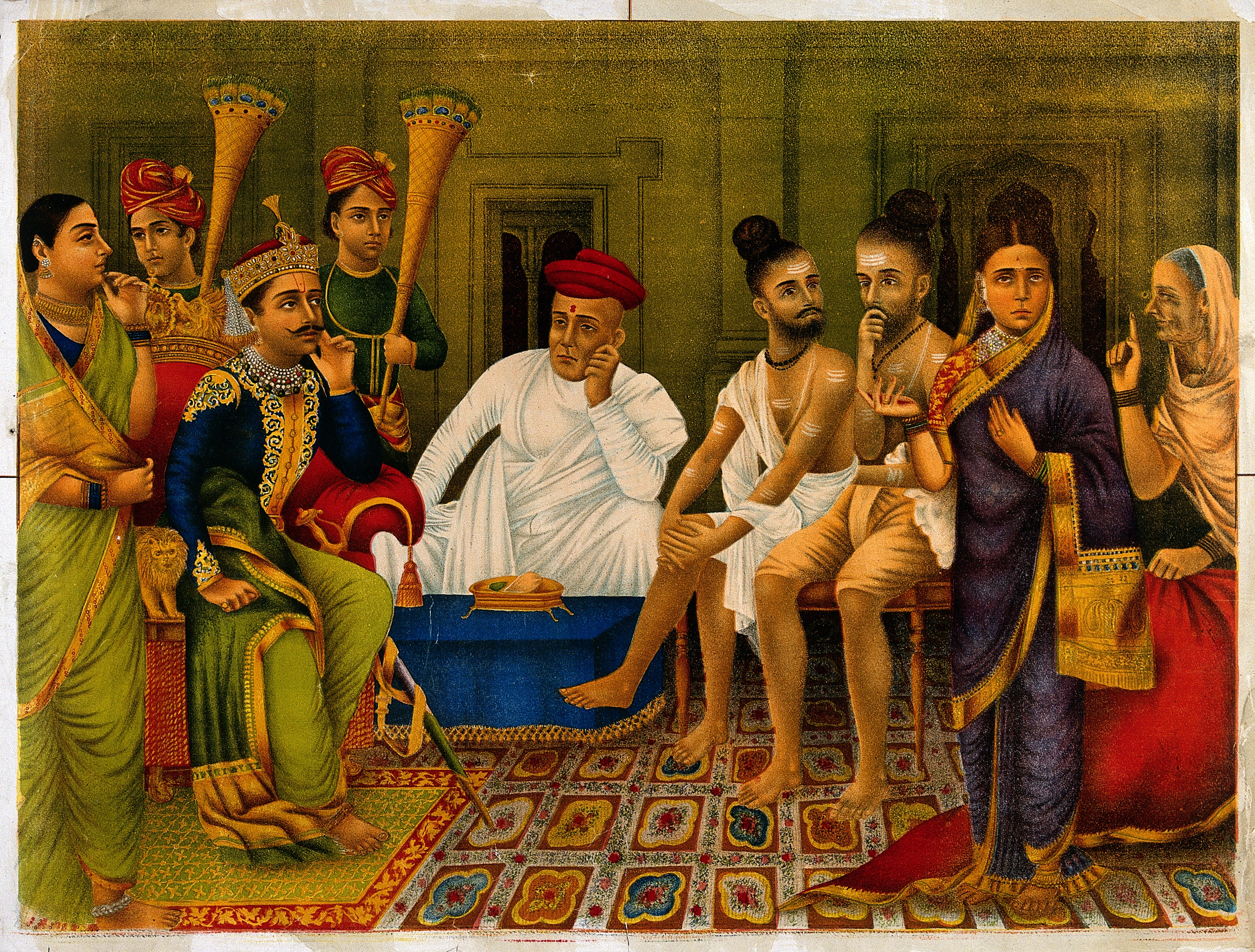
Dasharatha being asked in court to banish Rama by Kaikeyi and her humpbacked female slave Manthara

- The Telugu version Sri Ranganatha Ramayanam mentioned a small story involving young Rama and Manthara in Balakanda. When Rama was playing with a ball and a stick, suddenly Manthara threw the ball far away from Rama. In anger, Rama struck her on the knee with the stick and her knee was broken. This message was conveyed to king Dasharatha by Kaikeyi. The king decides to send Rama and his other sons to school. This incident makes the king think about his responsibility of educating his sons, so that they can learn and become wise. Manthara had developed a kind of antagonism towards Rama and was waiting for an opportunity to take revenge against him due to that incident. It is also said that during Rama's childhood Kaikeyi loved Rama more than Bharata and spend more time with him. This made Manthara jealous of Rama.

== In popular culture ==
- In Ramanand Sagar's television series Ramayan, Manthara is played by veteran character actress Lalita Pawar. In this TV series, it is shown that when Rama returns to Ayodhya after exile, he goes to meet Manthara, who has been imprisoned in a dark room. Seeing Rama, Manthara falls onto his feet and apologizes for all her sins, following which Rama forgives her.
- The 2015 Amish Tripathi's novel Ram: Scion of Ikshvaku (first book of Ram Chandra Series) portrayed Manthara as a rich woman in Sapt Sindhu who was a friend of Kaikeyi.
- In 2026, Manthara was portrayed by Sheeba Chaddha in the film, Ramayana: Part 1.

== Bibliography ==
- Mani, Vettam (1 January 2015). Puranic Encyclopedia: A Comprehensive Work with Special Reference to the Epic and Puranic Literature. Motilal Banarsidass. ISBN 978-81-208-0597-2.
