= Tambaur Ahmadabad =

- Town
- Interactive map of Tambaur Ahmadabad
- Coordinates: 27.729781°N 81.159667°E
- Country: India
- State: Uttar Pradesh
- District: Sitapur

Population (2001)
  - Total: 19,683

Languages
  - Official: Hindi
- Time zone: UTC+5:30 (IST)

Tambaur Ahmadabad is a town and a nagar panchayat in Sitapur district in the Indian state of Uttar Pradesh. It is located approximately 67 kilometer to the east of Sitapur town. It is well-connected with headquarters of Sitapur district by a two-lane Major District Road (MDR) 19C which has recently been widened to accommodate increased traffic.

== Geography ==
The town is located only two kilometers to the west of river Sharda, which meets river Ghaghra two kilometres further south near Mallapur village. The topography in and around the town is flat. The climate of this place identical to Middle Ganga Plain. This places experiences mainly four seasons a year; Winter (November - January), Spring (February - March), Summer (April - June) and monsoon or rainy season (July to September).

== History ==
The town was founded by a tamboli' (paan sellers) some more than 800–900 years ago. The place existed as a small village even during the invasion of Ghazi Saiyyad Salar Masud in the early 11th century. During the raid, one of his faithful soldiers, Burhan-ud-din, was killed near this village. He constructed a tomb or dargah for him which still exists.

In the days of Jai Chand, king of Kannauj, a Chandel chieftain, Alha by name, was granted the lands which were afterwards formed into the Tambaur pargana, with Tambaur as it main metropolis. Alha gave this town to one of his lieutenants, Ranua Pasi, who built a fort in it. Soon after, both master and man were slain in battle fighting under the banners of Jai Chand against Prithviraj Chauhan, king of Delhi. The Pasi's descendants still remained in possession for 330 years until dispossessed by Mughal king of Delhi, Akbar.

== Demographics ==
The Tambaur-cum-Ahamdabad Nagar Panchayat has population of 26,052, of which 13,641 are males while 12,411 are females as per report released by Census India 2011. The population of children with age of 0-6 is 5077, which is 19.49% of total population of the town. The female sex ratio is of 910 against the state average of 912. The literacy rate of Tambaur-cum-Ahamdabad is 51.52% lower than state (Uttar Pradesh) average of 67.68%. Male literacy is around 57.20% while female literacy rate is 45.18%.

Religion in Tambaur-Ahmedabad
Religion	Percent
Hindus	21.83%
Muslims	77.45%
Christians	0.35%
