= Chittaura Jheel =

- Ashtwarka jheel
- Location within Uttar Pradesh Location within India
- Location: Uttar Pradesh, India
- Coordinates: 27°32′24.3″N 81°38′31.8″E
- Type: lake

Chittaura Jheel, also known as Ashtwarka jheel) is a lake in Uttar Pradesh, India. It is situated about 8 km from Bahraich city, on Gonda road, near Jittora or Chittaura village. Many migratory birds are also found here during August–October (late monsoon period). A small river, Teri/Tedhi Nadi, originates from this lake. This river goes beyond Gonda and merges with the Saryu river. It is mentioned in the mythological texts as Kutila river.

Chittaura Jheel is a Hindu pilgrimage site. According to local legends, Ashtwarka Muni, the Guru of Maharaja Janak had become crooked from eight places of his body after being cursed. He had built an ashram on the banks of the Tedhi river and used to live here. By bathing in the river here every day, his crooked body was rejuvenated, due to which the crookedness of his body was over.

== Raja Suhaldev Mandir ==
According to historical evidences, the area beside the lake is the site of an 11th-century (year 1033) battle between the Hindu king Suhaldev and the Muslim invader Ghazi Saiyyad Salar Masud where Suhaldev defeated Ghazi.

In April 1950, Hindu organizations planned a fair at the dargah of Salar Masud, to commemorate Suhaldev. The local administration banned the fair to prevent Hindu-Muslim violence, which led to protests by Hindus. Ultimately, the administration lifted the prohibitory orders. The local Indian National Congress representative inaugurated the fair at Chittaura. Shri Suhaldev Smarak Samiti ("Suhaldev Monument Committee") was formed in 1954 to construct a temple of Suhaldev. Raja Birendra Bikram Singh, a [princely estate] ruler of Payagpur donated 500 [bigha]s of land (including the Chittora Lake) to the Samiti

A temple of Suhaldev, with several paintings and sculptures, was constructed on this land. In 2001, Hindu activists formed the Maharaja Suhaldev Sewa Samiti, which has been organizing various programmes to commemorate Suhaldev as a defender of the Hindu faith.

Today, a temple complex known as Raja Suhaldev Darbar is situated at the site. A statue of Raja Suhaldev along with a temple dedicated to Goddess Durga is present within the premises of this complex. The statue shows Raja Suhaldev sitting on a horse holding a bow and arrow. He is wearing the dress of a maharaja with a crown. Every year, fairs are organized here as per Hindu calendar on Kartik Purnima and Basant Panchami.

== Biodiversity & Conservation ==
The Chittaura Jheel supports diverse stock of carps, catfishes, perches, feather backs, gobies and puffers. A study was carried out from October, 2020 to September, 2021 to investigate the diversity of fishes and the conservation status of Chittaura Jheel. During the study period, 38 fish species belonging to 28 genera, 14 families and 7 orders have been identified. The order Cypriniformes was found the dominated order with 15 species(39.47%) followed by Siluriformes 10 species (26.31%), Perciformes 4 species (10.52%), Ophiocephaliformes 4 species (10.52%), Synbranchiformes2 species (5.26%), Osteoglossiformes 2 species (5.26%) and Clupiformes 1 species (2.63 %). According to IUCN, 30 are enlisted as Least Concern (LC), 2 species as near endangered (NE), 3 species as near threatened (NT), 2 listed as Endangered (EN) and 1 species was listed as Vulnerable (VU). There is a need of conservation of biodiversity of this natural wetland.

== See also ==
- List of lakes of Uttar Pradesh
- List of lakes in India
