= The Liberation of Sita =

2016 novel by P. Lalita Kumari

- Author: P. Lalita Kumari
- Translator: T. Vijay Kumar
- Language: English
- Publisher: Harper Perennial
- Publication date: 2016
- Publication place: India
- Media type: Print (hardback & paperback)
- ISBN: 9351772489

The Liberation of Sita is a 2016 collection of short-stories by Volga, the pen name of the Telugu poet and writer P. Lalita Kumari.
