= Salar Mas'ud =

Semi-legendary Muslim figure from India

Syed Salar Masud Ghazi
- Born: 10 February 1014; Ajmer
- Died: 15 June 1034 (aged 20); Bahraich
- Resting place: Dargah Syed Salar Masud Ghazi Bahraich
- Other names: Ghazi Miyan, Ghazi Baba, Baale Miyan
- Occupations: Military leader, religious figure, Sufi Saint
- Known for: Sufism
- Parent: Salar Sahu (father)

Syed Salar Mas'ud (10 February 1014 – 15 June 1034), also known as Ghazi Miyan, was a semi-legendary Muslim figure and military leader associated with the Ghaznavid campaigns in India in the early 11th century. According to the Persian hagiography Mirat-i-Masudi ("Mirror of Masud"), written in the 17th century, Masud accompanied his uncle Mahmud during the conquest of India and led military campaigns across regions such as Multan, Delhi, Meerut, and Kannauj. His campaigns aimed to expand the Ghaznavid influence and spread Islam in the Indian subcontinent.

== Mirat-i-Masudi legend ==
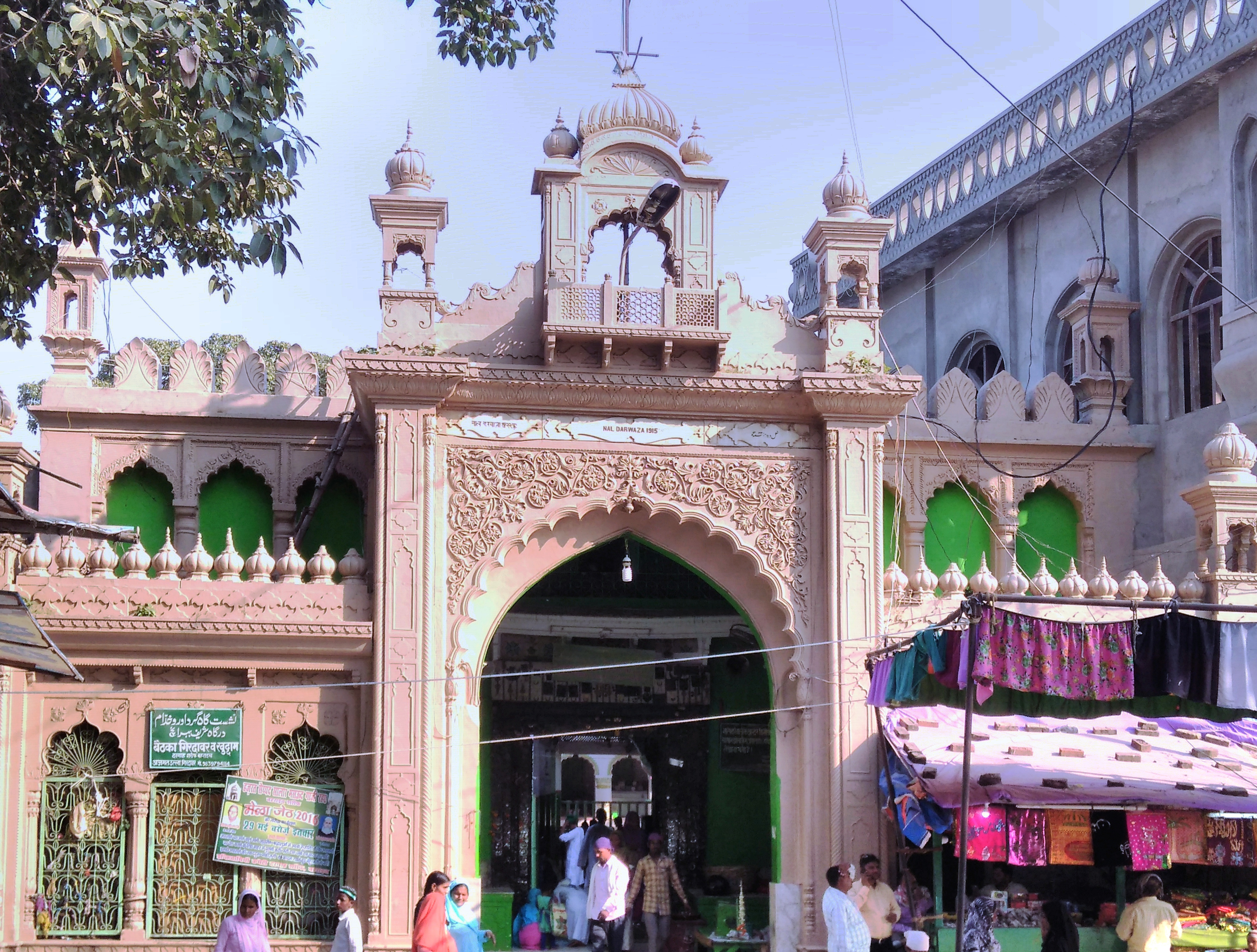
Ghazi Syed Masud Salar Dargah

The Mirat-i-Masudi narrates the legend of Salar Masud as follows:

=== Early life ===
In 1011 CE, the Muslims of Jalgaon, whose rights were being infringed upon by the local Hindu rulers, appealed Sultan Mahmud of Ghazni for help. Mahmud agreed to help them on the condition that they would mention his name in the Friday sermons (Khutbah), which would signify their acknowledgment of his suzerainty. Mahmud's general Salar Sahu defeated the Hindu rulers of Ajmer and surrounding regions. As a reward, Mahmud married his sister to Salar Sahu; Masud was the result of this marriage. Masud was born on 10 February 1014 CE, in Ajmer.

=== Military career ===
Syed Salar Masud Ghazi was a military commander who played a significant role in the Ghaznavid campaigns in India during the early 11th century. According to historical accounts, Masud accompanied his uncle, Mahmud of Ghazni, during his invasions of the Indian subcontinent. After Mahmud’s departure, Masud continued military campaigns, primarily in present-day Uttar Pradesh, aiming to expand Ghaznavid influence.

Early Campaigns

Masud is believed to have led forces into regions such as Multan, Delhi, Meerut, and Kannauj, encountering resistance from local Hindu rulers (Elliot & Dowson, 1867). His campaigns involved battles with various Rajput and other indigenous dynasties who opposed the Ghaznavid expansion (Habib, 1992).

Battle of Bahraich (1033–1034 CE)

One of the most significant military events associated with Masud was his campaign in Bahraich, Uttar Pradesh. In 1033 CE, he advanced into the region with a large army, facing opposition from a confederation of Hindu rulers led by Bhar King Maharaja Suhaldev Bhar (Elliot & Dowson, 1867). After prolonged skirmishes, the decisive battle took place in 1034 CE, where Masud’s forces were overwhelmed. He was ultimately killed in combat.

Legacy as a Warrior-Saint

Despite his military defeat, Masud’s legacy endured in Islamic traditions. He was later venerated as a warrior-saint, in spite of the title "Ghazi" which betrays his purpose, with his Dargah of Ghazi Saiyyad Salar Masud in Bahraich becoming an important pilgrimage site (Kumar, 2002). His campaigns, though unsuccessful in establishing lasting Ghaznavid control in the region, played a role in shaping the early encounters between Islamic and indigenous Indian forces.

=== Death ===
Syed Salar Masud Ghazi was killed in 1034 CE during the Battle of Bahraich against a confederation of Hindu rulers led by Bhar King Maharaja Suhaldev. According to historical accounts, Masud had led military campaigns across Uttar Pradesh, where he initially won battles against local rulers, expanding the influence of the Ghaznavid Empire.

Early Successes and the Battle of Bahraich

Masud's early military successes were marked by the defeat of several smaller Hindu chieftains, allowing him to advance into the region. When the local Hindu kings united under Maharaja Suhaldev Bhar to resist the Ghaznavid expansion, they brought together a much larger and more organized force than Masud's. In 1033 CE, the decisive Battle of Bahraich, on the bank of Chittora lake, took place, where Masud’s army was overwhelmed by the united local forces. The battle ended in a crushing defeat for Masud. Masud was shot by an arrow, and then beheaded by Maharaja Suhaldev Bhar. This crushing defeat of the Turkic forces, put a stop to Turkic invasions into India, for the next about hundred and fifty years.

Burial and Legacy

After his death, Masud’s body was buried in Bahraich, where his Dargah of Ghazi Saiyyad Salar Masud was later established. Over time, the site became a major religious and cultural center, attracting both Muslim and Hindu devotees. His annual Urs (death anniversary) continues to be observed, with thousands of pilgrims visiting the shrine each year (Elliot & Dowson, 1867).

== Other legends ==
According to one legend, not attested by Mirat-i-Masudi, Masud cured one Zuhra (or Zohra) Bibi of blindness. Zuhra Bibi, who came from a noble family of Rudauli, married him. But before this marriage could be consummated, Masud was killed. Zuhra Bibi was also buried in Bahraich after her death. Later, a stone from her burial-vault was taken to Rudauli, where a cenotaph was built in her memory. In Rudauli, an annual fair called Zohra-Mela, attracted Hindus and Muslims of lower castes. During this festival, the pilgrims used to bring offerings called "Zuhra's dowry" to the cenotaph. Zuhra Bibi was also commemorated in a ritual during the Bahraich urs, which involved dressing two boys as Masud and Zuhra Bibi respectively.

== Legacy ==
=== Delhi Sultanate period ===
The contemporary 11th century Ghaznavid chronicles do not mention Masud at all. However, he had become a well-known figure in Delhi Sultanate by the 12th century, when the pilgrimage to his tomb in Bahraich appears to have started, during the Ghurid rule. In 1250, the Delhi Sultan Nasiruddin Mahmud constructed an architectural complex around the tomb, during his stay in Bahraich. The 13th century poet Amir Khusro appears to mention Masud's tomb (dargah) in a 1290 CE letter. According to this letter, the "fragrant tomb of martyred commander" at Bahraich spread the "perfume of odorous wood" throughout Hindustan. In 1341, the Delhi Sultan Muhammad bin Tughluq and the Moroccan traveler Ibn Battuta visited the Bahraich dargah. Ibn Battuta narrates the legends of the saints, and also provides some information about his cult, including the ritual veneration of his banner and spear.

The earliest source that connects Masud to the Ghaznavids is Ziauddin Barani's Tarikh-i-Firuz Shahi (1357), written nearly three hundred years later. Barani mentions Masud as one of the heroes of Mahmud's campaigns in India. The text was composed during the reign of the Delhi Sultan Firuz Shah Tughlaq, who considered himself to be a spiritual disciple of Masud. In 1353, the ruler of Lakhnauti (Bengal) invaded Bahraich, purportedly because he believed that a visit to Masud's dargah could cure him of vitiligo. In response, Firuz Shah Tughluq invaded Bengal. He also visited the Bahraich dargah in 1372. According to the Sultan's court historian Shams-i Siraj 'Afif, Masud appeared in the Sultan's dream, and asked him to prepare for the day of the Last Judgment, and to propagate Islam by adopting a tougher policy against the non-Muslims. The next day, Sultan Firuz Shah Tughluq got his head shaved like a Sufi neophyte, and started spending his nights in prayers. Not all Sultans of Delhi held Masud in same reverence: in 1490, Sultan Sikandar Lodi banned the urs (death anniversary) at the dargah, because of the "unseemliness of the rites being performed there".

In the 16th century, the Indo-Afghan soldier Dattu Sarvani claimed to have seen Masud in his dream.

=== Mughal period ===
The earliest source that mentions Masud as a relative of Mahmud is Mughal court historian Abul Fazl's Ain-i-Akbari (16th century). The text states, "Salar Masud... was connected by blood with Mahmud Ghazni... sold his life bravely in battle and left an imperishable name." According to Abul Fazl, the cult of Masud was very popular: his dargah attracted pilgrims from remote districts. These pilgrims carried offerings and multi-coloured flags to the dargah, and encamped at the Mughal capital Agra on their way to Bahraich. Abul Fazl further states that in 1561 CE, the Mughal emperor Akbar himself walked among these pilgrims, disguised as an ordinary merchant visiting the urs celebrations at the dargah. In 1571 CE, Akbar made a grant for the Bahraich shrine.

The 17th century Persian language text Mirat-i-Masudi, written by the Sufi scholar Abdur Rahman Chishti, is the most comprehensive biography of Masud. The text is a historical romance, and the biography has a "gossipy feel". The author claims that Masud appeared in his dreams, and describes Masud's various achievements and miracles. He states that his work is based on an "Old History" written by one Mulla Mahmud Ghazanavi. The author further claims that the 11th century Masud was a disciple of the 12th century Sufi saint Moinuddin Chishti: the later historians have completely rejected this clear anachronism. According to Muzaffar Alam, Abdur Rahman Chishti's objective was to glorify the Chishtiya branch of Sufisim, as a counter to the rising influence of the Naqshbandi branch at the Mughal court.

In 1765, Akbar's grant was renewed by Shuja-ud-Daula, the Nawab of Awadh. His successor Asaf-ud-Daula visited the Bahraich shrine several times. Mirza Muhammad Qateel's Haft Tamasha (1811–12) and Cazim Ali's Barah Masa (1812) describe the ceremonies held to commemorate Masud. The Haft Tamasha mentions that an annual ceremony was held in Rudauli to mark Masud's death on the night of his wedding. A replica of Masud's nuptial bed was made and brought out for ceremonial viewing. The Barah Masa provides a description of the Bahraich shrine, and the ceremony held there. However, neither of these texts describe his life.

Gradually, Masud came to be known as a warrior-saint among the Muslims, who revered him as "Ghazi Miyan". Over time, the pilgrimage to his dargah increased so much that the site was not able to accommodate all the pilgrims. Consequently, his shrines were erected in other towns of the Awadh region, including Salargarh (named in his honour), Faizabad, Satrikh and Rudauli. The mazar of his father Salar Sahu (called "Birdha Baba" by Hindus) in Satrikh also became a pilgrimage site. Several tombs of people purported to be his fellow fighters were also erected; most of these tombs are fabricated. These tombs include the mazar of Makhdum Azizuddin (or Lal Pir) in Kannauj, the grave of the kotwal Miyan Rajab in Kannauj, and the mausoleum of Burhanuddin in Tambaur. People claimed to have seen ghosts of Miyan Rajab as a headless horseman. Some people in Faizabad claimed to have seen the whole army of Masud in form of ghosts.

Masud's followers also venerated him as a saint who miraculously cured leprosy. The most prominent among his followers were Meo Muslims (Mewatis), who are said to have been converted to Islam by him. Although the Naqshbandis, Wahhabis and some Islamic reformers criticized his cult, his popularity did not decline in the 18th century. The Punjabi Sufi poet Waris Shah named him among the five most venerated Sufi Pirs (saints).

=== British period ===
In the 19th century, the British administrators were bewildered at the Hindu veneration of Masud. William Henry Sleeman, the British Resident in Awadh, remarked:

Strange to say, Hindoos as well as Mahommedans make offerings to this shrine, and implore the favours of this military ruffian, whose only recorded merit consists of having destroyed a great many Hindoos in a wanton and unprovoked invasion of their territory. They say, that he did what he did against Hindoos in the conscientious discharge of his duties, and could not have done it without God's permission—that God must then have been angry with them for their transgressions, and used this man, and all the other Mahommedan invaders of their country, as instruments of his vengeance, and means to bring about his purposes: that is, the thinking portion of the Hindoos say this. The mass think that the old man must still have a good deal of interest in heaven, which he may be induced to exercise in their favour, by suitable offerings and personal applications to his shrine.

Russian orientalist Anna Suvorova notes that the rituals of the Masud's cult show some indigenous Hindu influence. The local Hindus revered Masud as "Bade Miyan" (Revered Boy), "Bale Pir" (Boy Saint), "Hathile Pir" (Obstinate Saint), "Pir Bahlim" and "Gajan Dulha".

=== Independent India ===
In the 2000s, the majority of the visitors to the annual fair held at Masud's dargah were Hindus. According to the local legends glorifying Salar Masud, his killer Suhaldev was a cruel king who oppressed his subjects. However, the Hindu organizations have attempted to portray Suahldev as a Hindu icon who fought against a Muslim invader. In these narratives, Masud is portrayed as a cruel ruler who ravaged Hindu women.

According to local Hindus, Chittora near modern Bahraich is the place where he died in a battle. Hindu nationalist organizations have characterized Suhaldev as a saviour of Hindus against the Muslim invader Masud (popularly known as "Ghazi Mian"). They have constructed a temple dedicated to Suhaldev in Chittora.

== See also ==
- Legend of Suheldev: The King Who Saved India
