= Batwar =

- Location in Khyber Pakhtunkhwa, Pakistan
- Coordinates: 34°56′N 71°31′E
- Country: Pakistan
- Province: Khyber Pakhtunkhwa
- District: Bajaur
- Tehsil: Salarzai

Population (2017)
  - Total: 5,267
- Time zone: UTC+5 (PST)
  - Summer (DST): UTC+6 (PDT)

Batwar is an area of Salarzai Tehsil, in Bajaur District, Khyber Pakhtunkhwa province, Pakistan. The population is 5,267 according to the 2017 census.
