= Amish Tripathi =

Indian author

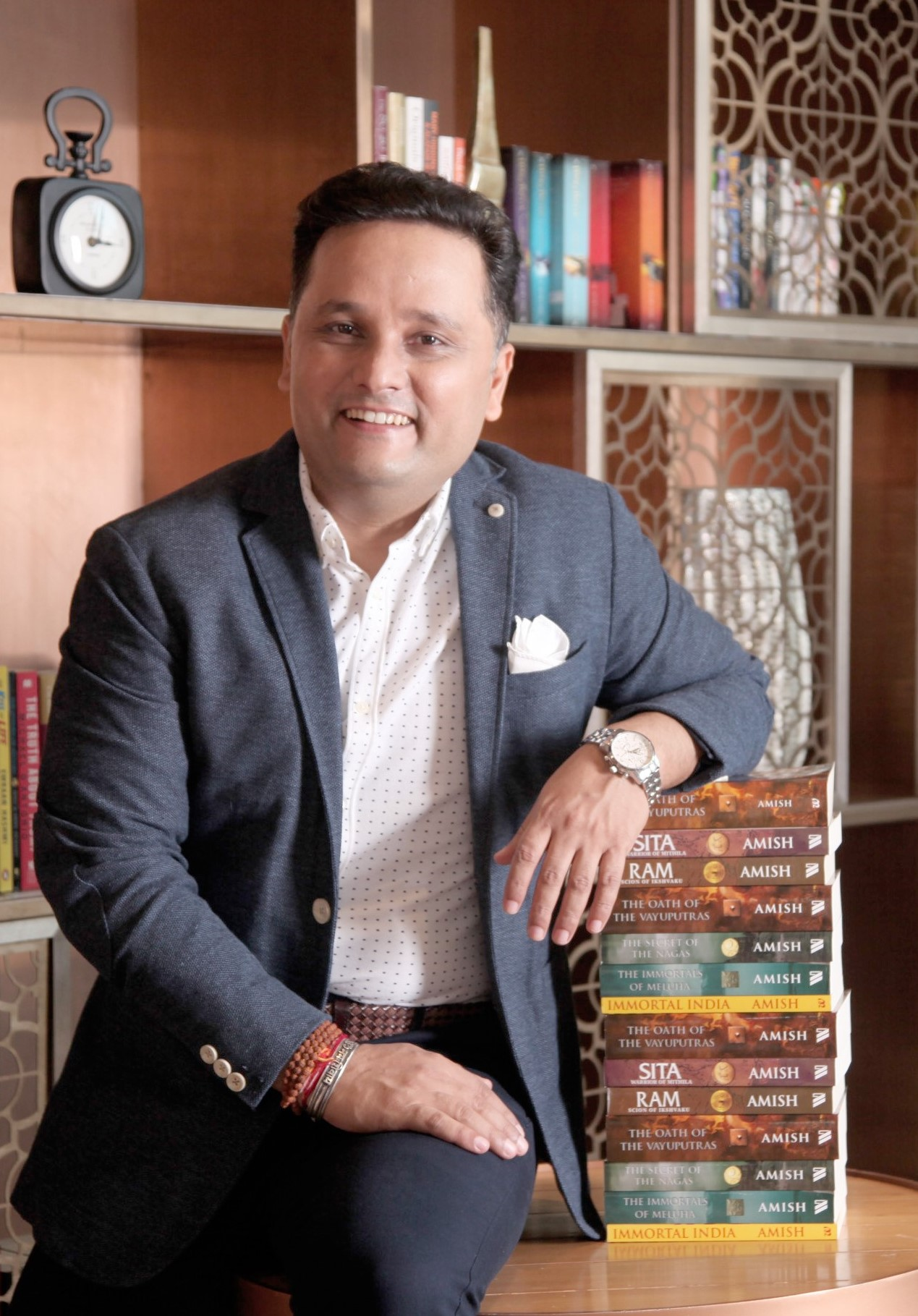
- Tripathi in 2020
- Born: 18 October 1974 (age 52); Mumbai, Maharashtra, India
- Education: The Lawrence School, Lovedale; Cathedral & John Connon School; St. Xavier's College, Mumbai; IIM Calcutta
- Occupation: Author
- Children: Neel Tripathi
- Writing career
- Genres: Historical, Mythological-Fiction
- Notable works: Shiva Trilogy; Ram Chandra Series
- Website: authoramish.com

Amish Tripathi (born 18 October 1974) is an author, former diplomat, broadcaster and entrepreneur from India. He is among the fastest-selling authors in Indian publishing history, known best for The Shiva Trilogy and Ram Chandra Series.

He has authored 13 books that have sold over 8 million copies and been translated into 21 Indian and international languages since 2010. He served as Minister (Culture & Education) at the High Commission of India in the UK and Director of the Nehru Centre, London from 2019 to 2023. In addition, he is a host & producer for TV documentaries, most recently with Warner Bros Discovery TV, NDTV and Jio Cinema. His documentaries include Legends of the Ramayana with Amish, The Journey of India with co-host Amitabh Bachchan, Ram Janmabhoomi: Return Of A Splendid Sun (most successful Indian documentary of 2024), Mahakumbh Tales with Amish, and Legends of Shiva with Amish.

Amish has also started a Podcast called Immortal India with Amish, which has garnered more than 100,000 subscribers in just 5 months.

Amish Tripathi recently won the Best Factual Presenter across Asia at the Asian Academy Creative Awards (2025), beating country representatives from across Asia (including Australia). He has also received an honorary doctorate from the University of York, United Kingdom, in recognition of his contributions to Indian literature and global cultural dialogue. Amish Tripathi is the recipient of the prestigious S. L. Bhyrappa Award for The Chola Tigers, which was presented by the Hon'ble Finance Minister, Smt. Nirmala Sitharaman in 2026. Amish Tripathi was honoured with the Maharaja Sawai Pratap Singh Award by Diya Kumari ji, Hon Deputy Chief Minister of Rajasthan and Princess of the Jaipur Royal Family, in 2026 for his significant contributions to literature and education.22

== Early life and education ==
Amish Tripathi was born in Mumbai and grew up near Rourkela, Odisha. He is an alumnus of The Lawrence School, Lovedale; Cathedral & John Connon School; St. Xavier's College, Mumbai; and Indian Institute of Management Calcutta.

== Career ==
=== Banking ===
Amish studied at IIM-Calcutta. Following graduation, he worked in the financial services industry for fourteen years, in organisations such as Standard Chartered Bank, IDBI Bank, Development Bank of Singapore and IDBI Federal Life Insurance.

=== Writing ===
The Immortals of Meluha, Tripathi's first novel and first in the Shiva Trilogy, was published in February 2010. The second book in the series, The Secret of the Nagas, was released in August 2011, and the third and final installment, titled The Oath of the Vayuputras, was released in February 2013. The Shiva Trilogy is the fastest-selling book series in Indian publishing history.

The Scion of Ikshvaku was released in June 2015. It is the first book in the Ram Chandra series. It follows the story of Ram and is a prequel to the Shiva Trilogy. The Scion of Ikshvaku won the Crossword Book's "Best Popular Award". Sita: Warrior of Mithila, the sequel to The Scion of Ikshvaku, was released in May 2017. It became the highest-selling book of 2017. Raavan: The Enemy of Aryavarta, the third book in The Ram Chandra series, was released in July 2019. The fourth book in The Ram Chandra Series, War of Lanka, was released on 3 October 2022. The Ram Chandra Series is the second-fastest-selling book series in Indian publishing history.

Legend of Suheldev: The King Who Saved India, his first historical book and first book in Indic Chronicles, was released in June 2020.

The Chola Tigers: Avengers Of Somnath, second historical fiction book in Indic Chronicles was released on 29 August 2025. The cover of the book was launched by Superstar & Thalaivar Rajinikanth.

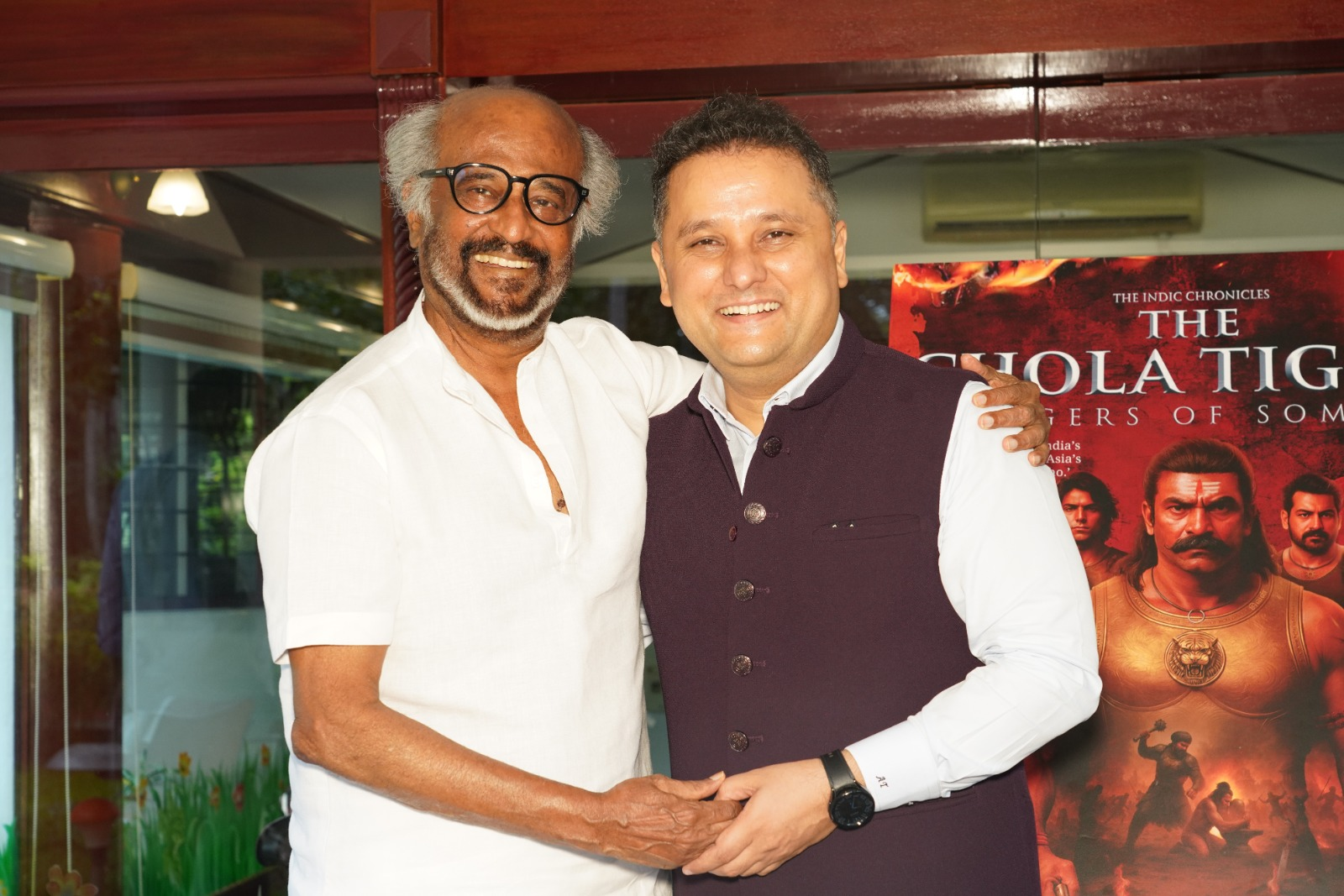
Superstar & Thalaivar Rajinikanth with Amish at the cover launch The Chola Tigers: Avengers Of Somnath

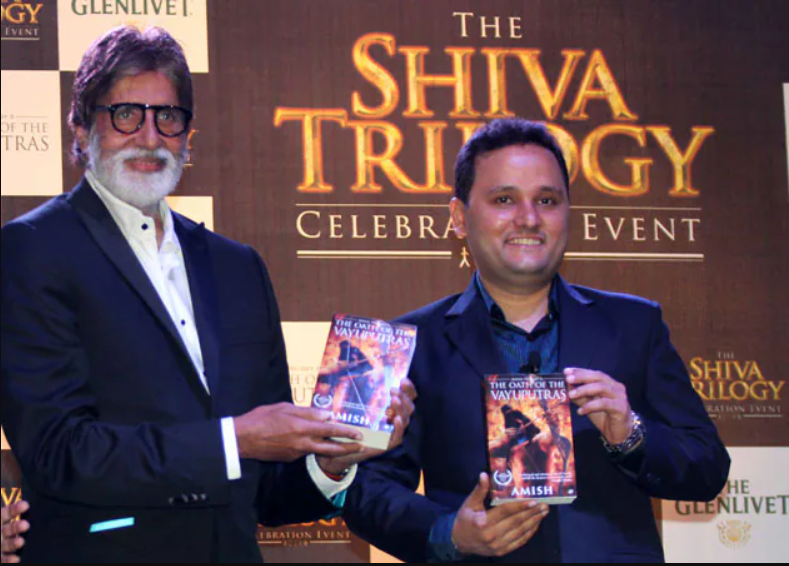
Amitabh Bachchan at the success event of The Shiva Trilogy

Tripathi released his first non-fiction book, Immortal India, in August 2017. He also released Dharma: Decoding the Epics for a Meaningful Life in December 2020, co-authored with his sister Bhavna Roy. He released Idols: Unearthing the Power of Murti Puja, also co-authored with his sister Bhavna Roy, in 2023.

Amish's literary works have been translated into nine regional languages, including Hindi, Odia, Bengali, Marathi, Tamil, Telugu, and Kannada, as well as four international languages, including French and Polish.

Speaking to News4masses in an interview at the Kolkata Literary Meet in March 2022, Tripathi revealed his plans to come up with a book on Mahabharata soon.

In June 2024, Amish, in collaboration with bestselling author Jeffrey Archer, announced the launch of the IGF Archer-Amish Award for Literature at the 6th annual India Global Forum (IGF) in London. The award, with a monetary prize of $25,000, aims to nurture talent in contemporary Indian fiction and celebrate storytelling that makes a significant contribution to the India story.

In July 2026, Amish Tripathi released Dhruv-Tara & The Great Indian History Quiz, his first children's book and the first volume in a planned multiple-book middle-grade adventure series.

=== Film ===
In September 2020, he announced that he is turning into a producer with an adaptation of his novel, Legend of Suheldev: The King Who Saved India, under the banner Immortal Studios, with Wakaoo Films and Casa Media.

In August 2024, Amish announced his role as Creative Director for the film project Shri Radha Ramanam, which aims to bring the tale of Lord Krishna to international audiences. The film, set for release in February 2026, is produced by Creativeland Studios Entertainment and features a script that explores themes of love and compassion.

=== Broadcaster ===
Amish began his career as a documentary host with Warner Bros Discovery programme, Legends of the Ramayana with Amish. This programme, produced by Wide Angle Films, won the Digital Reinvent award for Best Documentary. Amish also hosted an episode on Faith for the Warner Bros Discovery documentary series The Journey of India, with co-host Amitabh Bachchan, where Amish paid homage to India's diversity of faiths.

On 25 January 2024, Amish's latest documentary on the history of the Ram Janmabhoomi and the life of Lord Ram titled, Ram Janmabhoomi: Return of a splendid sun premiered on NDTV and is available on JioCinema. Amish has hosted, conceptualised, and co-produced this documentary with Dilip Piramal, renowned industrialist (through the Dilip Piramal Foundation). According to Ormax Media Report, Ram Janmabhoomi: Return of a splendid sun became the 4th Most-Watched Hindi Unscripted Shows of 2024.

In early 2025, two new documentaries were released that were hosted by Amish. The first was Mahakumbh Tales with Amish, which was broadcast on NDTV in both English and Hindi. The other documentary was Legends of Shiva with Amish the second season in the successful Legends franchise on Warner Bros Discovery, and a sequel to the Legends of the Ramayana with Amish.

On 7 September 2024, Amish expanded his influence beyond literature with the launch of the Immortal India with Amish podcast. This podcast is available on YouTube and various other platforms. This podcast reflects his deep passion for Indian history, culture, and values, offering a unique platform for discussions that bridge the past with contemporary issues. In Immortal India, Tripathi delves into a variety of topics, ranging from India's rich historical heritage and complex mythology to its evolving economic landscape. The Podcast has already garnered more than 100,000 subscribers within a few months of launch.

In May 2026, Amish began hosting Infinite India – The Bharatiya Way, a series launched in collaboration with DD News, India's national broadcaster. The programme seeks to challenge traditional beliefs and colonial narratives about Indian history, presenting decolonised versions of the past, celebrating that which is good, and questioning that which needs reform.

=== Gaming ===
Amish Tripathi has partnered with veteran game producer Nouredine Abboud to create "Bharatvarsha / The Age of Bharat", a new gaming franchise set in ancient India. Scheduled to launch its first AAA fantasy video game by late 2026, the project aims to weave narratives of Indic heritage into digital interactive entertainment. Tripathi will lead narrative development, expanding the franchise into films, TV series, and merchandise. He emphasizes that gaming transcends mere play, offering a unique platform for storytelling rooted in ancient Indian culture.

=== Diplomacy ===
Amish served as Director of Nehru Centre, London, and Minister (Culture & Education) at the High Commission of India in the UK from October 2019 to October 2023. Amish as the director of The Nehru Centre was the youngest and the first literary figure in that role. During his four years as director, he led a positive change, making the centre more influential and known globally. During the COVID-19 pandemic, Amish held a range of online events and virtual engagements which not only sustained cultural momentum but also expanded The Nehru Centre's reach beyond geographical boundaries, including the Midlands, Scotland, Wales, and beyond.

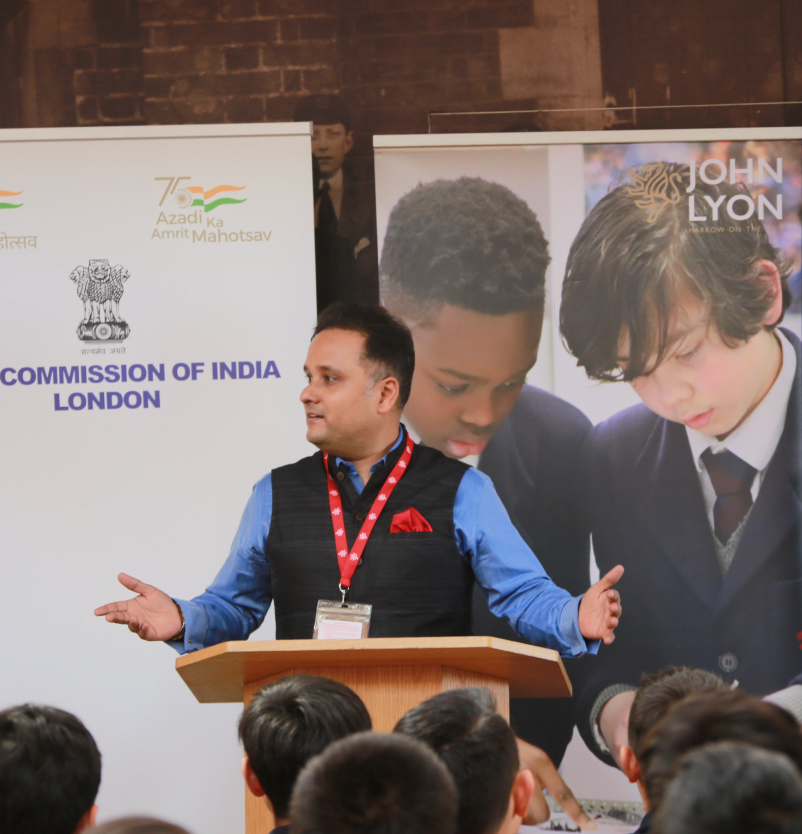
Amish Tripathi as a diplomat in the UK

=== Awards and recognition ===
- Honoured with the Maharaja Sawai Pratap Singh Award by Diya Kumari ji, Hon Deputy Chief Minister of Rajasthan and Princess of the Jaipur Royal Family for his significant contributions to literature and education (2026)
- Recipient of the prestigious S. L. Bhyrappa Award for The Chola Tigers, presented by Hon'ble Finance Minister Smt. Nirmala Sitharama (2026)
- Doctor of the University honoris causa, Honorary Degree, University of York, United Kingdom
- Best Factual Presenter for Legends of Shiva with Amish at Asian Academy Creative Awards (2025)
- Global Personality Award in Literature at NBT Utsav (2024)
- Dwarka Prasad Agarwal Award at the Jaipur Literature Festival (2024)
- Aaj Tak Sahitya Jagruti Popular Writer Award (2023)
- 21st Century Icon Awards, London (2021)
- Golden Book Award - Legend of Suheldev (2022)
- Listed among Top-50 Most Powerful People by India Today (2019)
- Honorary Doctorate by Jharkhand Rai University for outstanding contribution to Art & Literature (2019)
- Hello Hall of Fame Awards for Literary Excellence (2019)
- Jashn-e-youngistan Award (2018)
- Ustad Bismillah Khan Award (2018) for contribution to Indian culture
- Kalinga International Literary Award (2018)
- Distinguished Alumnus Award (2017) from IIM - Calcutta
- Raymond Crossword Popular Fiction Award for his book Scion of Ikshvaku in (2016)
- Selected as an Eisenhower Fellow (A prestigious American programme for young global leaders) (2014)

== Bibliography ==
=== Shiva Trilogy ===
- The Immortals of Meluha (2010)
- The Secret of the Nagas (2011)
- The Oath of the Vayuputras (2013)

=== Ram Chandra Series ===
- Ram: Scion of Ikshvaku (2015)
- Sita: Warrior of Mithila (2017)
- Raavan: Enemy of Aryavarta (2019)
- War of Lanka (2022)

=== Indic Chronicles ===
- Legend of Suheldev (2020)
- The Chola Tigers: Avengers of Somnath (2025)

=== Non-fiction ===
- Immortal India: Young India, Timeless Civilisation (2017)
- Dharma: Decoding the Epics for a Meaningful Life (2020)
- Idols: Unearthing the Power of Murti Puja (2023)

=== Children's Fiction ===
- Dhruv-Tara & The Great Indian History Quiz (2026)

== Filmography ==
Year	Title	Subject	Credit(s)
2022	Legends of the Ramayana with Amish	On Warner Bros Discovery. Amish traverses 5,000 kilometres in the footsteps of Rama, India's biggest cultural hero, to unravel mysteries of this great epic. This three-episode docu-series hosted by Amish indulges in unexplored stories and myths around the ‘Ramayana’ and shares insights in discussion with writers, geologists and many more experts.	Host
2022	The Journey of India	On Warner Bros Discovery. India is home to multiple faiths and encompasses spirituality through myriad experiences. Amish discovers Easter against the Goan sunset, walks through temples, immerses in a Ramadan feast and reveals why India is the land of the faith.	Host
2024	Ram Janmabhoomi: Return Of A Splendid Sun	On Jio Cinema and NDTV. An in-depth exploration of the history of the Ram Janmabhoomi, the life of Lord Ram and the reasons why he is the ideal social and cultural ambassador of the great Indian civilization. How this 'homecoming' of Ram should be treated and celebrated as a second Diwali.	Host and Producer
2025	Mahakumbh Tales with Amish Tripathi	On NDTV. A 7-episode documentary on the MahaKumbh Mela, the largest religious gathering in human history. The documentary was shot on-location in Prayagraj, in 2 languages viz: English & Hindi. Notably, Amish chose to record each shot in 2 languages (English & Hindi) rather than dubbing later.	Host
2025	Legends of Shiva with Amish	On Warner Bros Discovery. Amish returns to the successful Legends franchise with this documentary series based on Lord Shiva. Exquisitely shot across India and foreign countries, this documentary covers the various aspects of the Hindu God Lord Shiva. Amish visited temples and locations in far flung places, covering the depth of passion and emotion that Lord Shiva generates among both Indians and non-Indians. The documentary has already hit the charts as the most successful one of the year.	Host

== See also ==
- List of Indian writers

	Works by Amish Tripathi
Shiva Trilogy	The Immortals of Meluha The Secret of the Nagas The Oath of the Vayuputras
Ram Chandra Series	Ram: Scion of Ikshvaku Sita: Warrior of Mithila Raavan: Enemy of Aryavarta
Indic Chronicles	Legend of Suheldev: The King Who Saved India
Non - Fiction	The Immortal India Dharma: Decoding the Epics for a Meaningful Life
