= Satrikh =

- Town
- Location in Uttar Pradesh, India
- Coordinates: 26.87°N 81.2°E
- Country: India
- State: Uttar Pradesh
- District: Barabanki
- Elevation: 111 m (364 ft)

Population (2011)
  - Total: 12,107

Languages
  - Official: Hindi
- Time zone: UTC+5:30 (IST)
- Vehicle registration: UP-41
- Website: www.netword.in

Satrikh is a town and a nagar panchayat in Barabanki district in the Indian state of Uttar Pradesh.

== Demographics ==
As per the 2011 Census, Satrikh has a population of 12,107 of which 6,368 are male and 5,739 are female. The town has a literacy rate of 56.29%, lower than state average of 67.68%. Male literacy is 62.02% while female literacy is 50.00%. In Satrikh, 15.41% of the population is under six years of age.

== Legend ==
=== Ramayan Era ===
It is said that in ancient times Satrikh was a part of a kingdom ruled by Suryavanshi king. King Dashrath and his famous son Ram were part of this dynasty. Guru Vashisht was their Kulguru, and he preached and taught the young princes of the dynasty at Satrikh, which was initially known as Saptrishi.

== History ==
The Muslims made their first settlement at Satrikh, in 421 AD. / 1030 AD Ghazi Saiyyed Salar Sahu or Saiyed Salar Dawood or Sahu Bin Ataullah Alavi or Salar Sahu (Persian: غازى سيد سالار ساھو) was commander in the army of Sultan Mahmud Ghaznavi who came to the Indian subcontinent in the early 11th century. Salar Sahu was a descendant of Ali. His father's name was Tahir Ataullah, and his son was Ghazi Saiyyad Salar Masud. He had two brothers. One was Syed Maroofuddin Ghazi. He was probably a brother-in-law of the Sultan, purportedly married to the latter's sister, Sitr-i-Mu'alla. He came to India along with Sultan Mahmud Ghaznavi as his army commander. He died and is buried in Satrikh.

=== Nawabs of Awadh Era ===
During the last years of Nawabs of Awadh, Satrikh was a Taluqa of Nawabi and British Awadh. This estate comprised 85 villages. All the villages were to pay their 'lagan' (tax) to the Taluqedar of Satrikh. The Taluqa of Satrikh was transferred from Chaudhary's of Satrikh to Late Qazi's.

== Tomb of Ghazi Saiyed Salar Dawood ==
The mausoleum of Gazi Saiyyed Salar Sahu, father of Muslim Warrior Saint Saiyed Salar Masood Ghazi is situated in Satrikh. At his grave, people gather in pilgrimage during the full moon of the Hindu month of Jyeshta. A five-day-long urs allows thousands of devotees to pray. His tomb is known as "Budhe Baba ki mazar" (Grand Master's Mausoleum). The battlefield of Saiyed Salar Dawood Ghazi was at Zafarpur village and was fought between the invading army and the local farmers on the banks of Reth River. Remains from that period include unknown graves. The property is owned by the family of His Highness Sheikh Fareed Ahmed, who was the last Zamindar of Zafarpur. It is now used as an ancestral graveyard by his family.
