= Westland Books =

Indian publishing house

Westland
- Parent company: Nasadiya Technologies Pvt. Ltd.
- Predecessor: Tata, Amazon
- Founded: 1962; 64 years ago
- Founder: Padmanabhan family
- Country of origin: India
- Imprints: Context; East West Books; Ekada (formerly Eka); If; Pratilipi Paperbacks; Queer Directions; Red Panda; Tranquebar Press; Westland; Westland Business; Westland Classics; Westland Non-Fiction; Westland Sport

Westland Books or Westland Publications is an Indian publishing house. It was co-founded by the Padmanabhan family in 1962, starting out under the name East West Books. Tata owned it from 2008 as a subsidiary under Trent (Westside). It was owned by Amazon under Amazon Eurasia Holdings SARL from 2017 till 2022. Imprints include Context, Ekada, Red Panda, Tranquebar, and others.

In February 2022, Amazon announced that it will be shutting down Westland Books, after having carried out a "thorough review". In April 2022, it was announced that the Westland team was going into partnership with Indian online digital platform Pratilipi to continue publishing books.
