= Minor Pillar Edicts =

3rd-century BCE Indian inscriptions

Minor Pillar Edicts of Ashoka
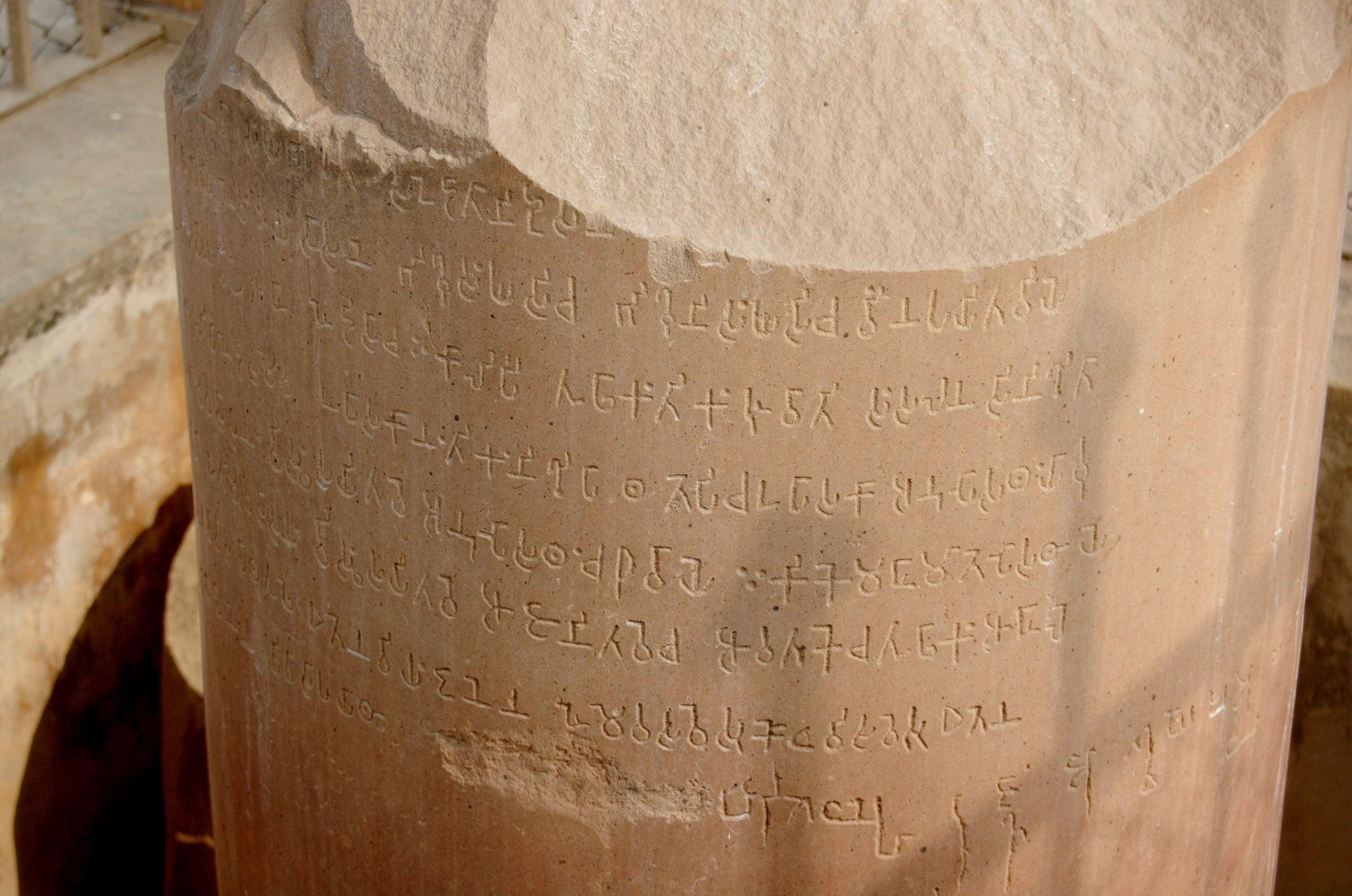
- Minor Pillar Edict on the Sarnath pillar.
- Material: Sandstone
- Created: 3rd century BCE
- Present location: India, Afghanistan

Location
- Locations of the Minor Pillar Edicts of Ashoka.

The Minor Pillar Edicts of Indian Emperor Ashoka refer to 5 separate minor Edicts of Ashoka inscribed on columns, the Pillars of Ashoka, which are among the earliest dated inscriptions of any Indian monarch. A full English translation of the Edicts was published by Romila Thapar.

These edicts are preceded chronologically by the Minor Rock Edicts and may have been made in parallel with the Major Rock Edicts. The inscription technique is generally poor compared for example to the later Major Pillar Edicts, however they are often associated with some of the artistically most sophisticated pillar capitals of Ashoka. This fact led some authors to think that the most sophisticated capitals were actually the earliest in the sequence of Ashokan pillars and that style degraded over a short period of time.

These were made probably made at the beginning of the reign of Ashoka (reigned 262–233 BCE), from the year 12 of his reign, that is, from 250 BCE.

== History ==
Ashoka was the third monarch of the Maurya Empire in India, reigning from around 269 BCE. Ashoka famously converted to Buddhism and renounced violence soon after being victorious in a gruesome Kalinga War, yet filled with deep remorse for the bloodshed of the war. Although he was a major historical figure, little definitive information was known as there were few records of his reign until the 19th century when a large number of his edicts, inscribed on rocks and pillars, were found in India, Nepal, Pakistan and Afghanistan. These many edicts were concerned with practical instructions in running a kingdom such as the design of irrigation systems and descriptions of Ashoka's beliefs in peaceful moral behavior. They contain little personal detail about his life.

== List of the Minor Pillar Edicts ==
Asoka’s Minor Pillar Edicts are exclusively inscribed on several of the Pillars of Ashoka, at Sarnath, Sanchi, Allahabad (a pillar initially located in Kosambi), Rummindei and Nigali Sagar. They are all in the Prakrit language and the Brahmi script.

These pillar edicts are:

The Schism Edicts

Sanchi Schism Edict
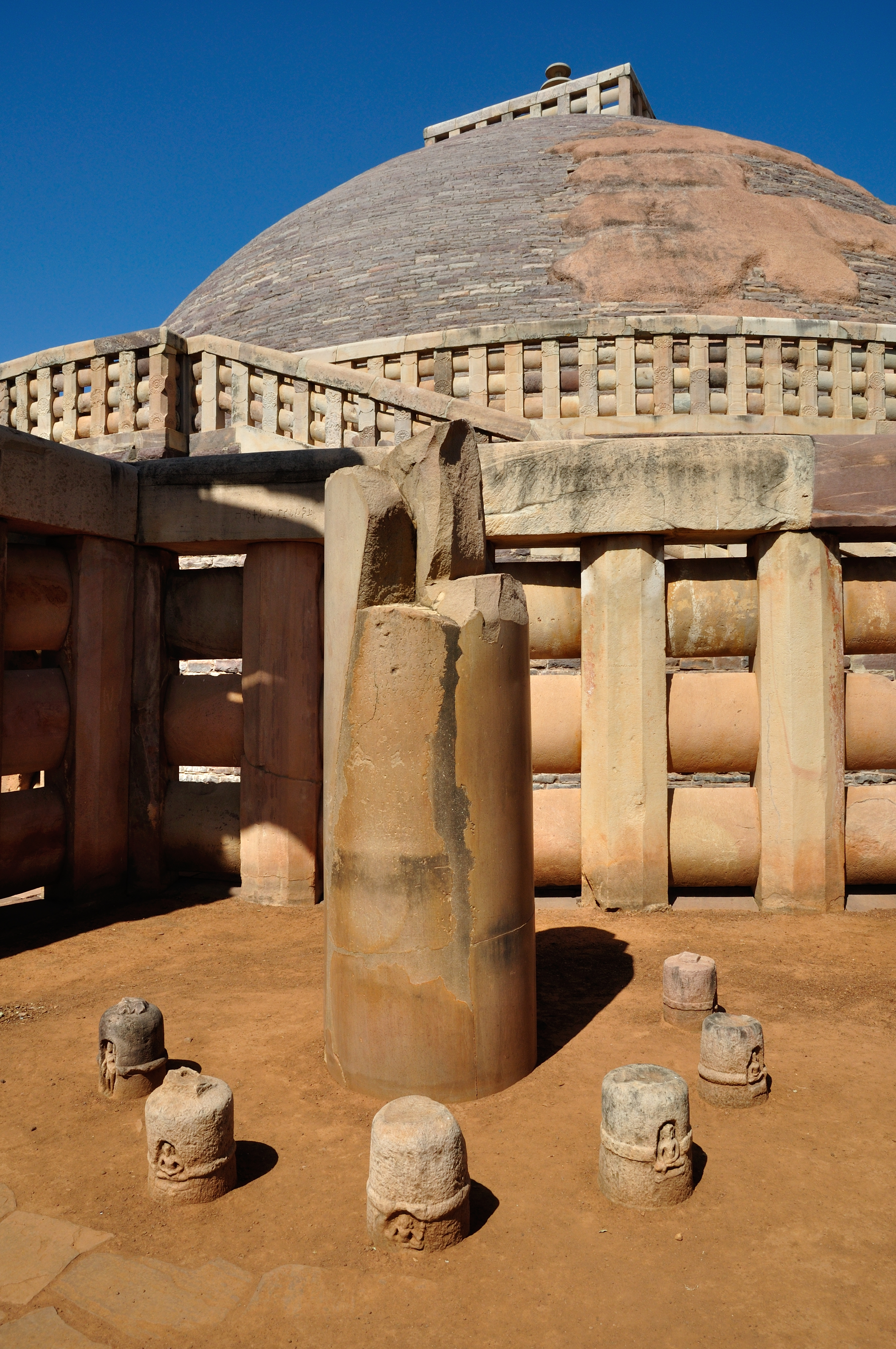
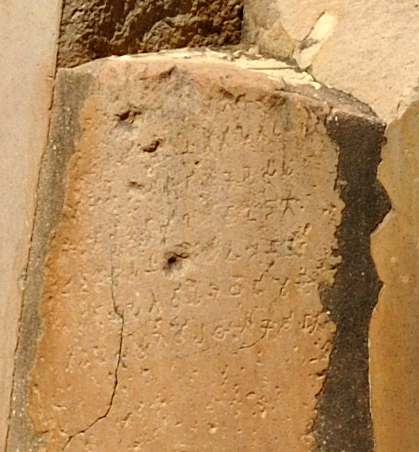
Remains of the Ashokan Pillar in polished stone at Sanchi, with its Schism Edict (detail).

Asoka’s injunction against shism in the Samgha. Found on the Sarnath, Sanchi and Allahabad pillars. These are among the earliest inscriptions of Ashoka, at a time when inscription techniques in India where not yet mature. In contrast, the lion capitals crowning these edicts (Sarnath and Sanchi) are the most refined of those produced during the time of Ashoka.

All the Schism edits are rather fragmentary, but the similarity of their messages permit a clear reconstruction:

"The Beloved of the Gods orders the officers of Kauśāmbī/ Pāṭa(liputra) thus: No one is to cause dissention in the Order. The Order of monks and nuns has been united, and this unity should last for as long as my sons and great grandsons, and the moon and the sun. Whoever creates a schism in the Order, whether monk or nun, is to be dressed in white garments, and to be put in a place not inhabited by monks or nuns. For it is my wish that the Order should remain united and endure for long. This is to be made known to the Order of monks and the Order of nuns."

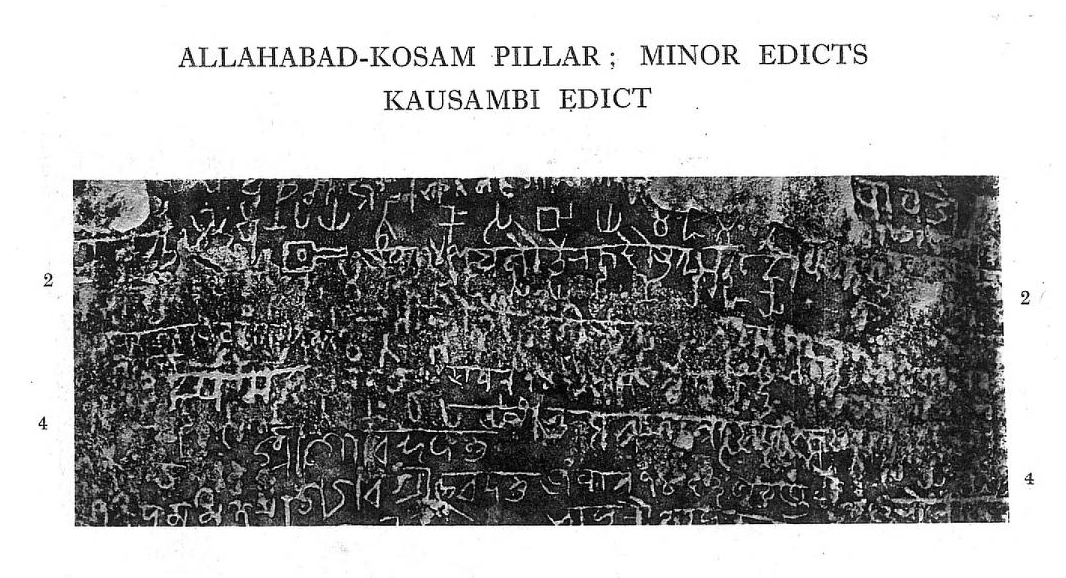
Kosambi-Allahabad Schism Edict.

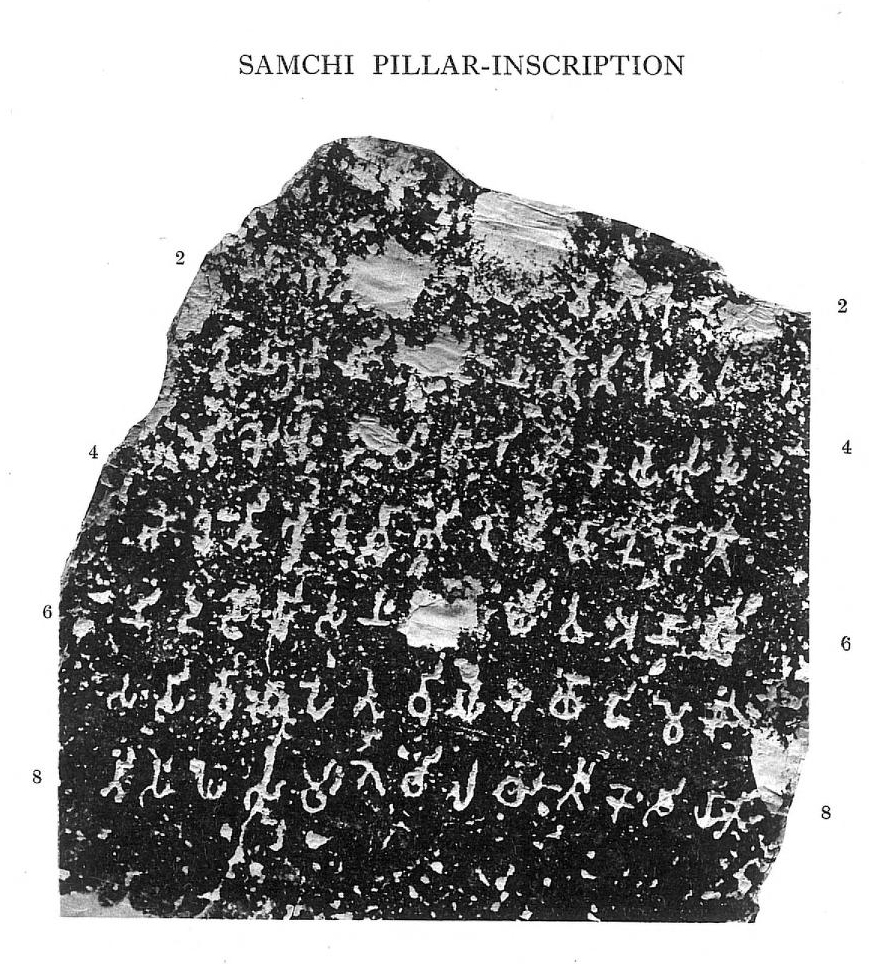
Sanchi Schism Edict.

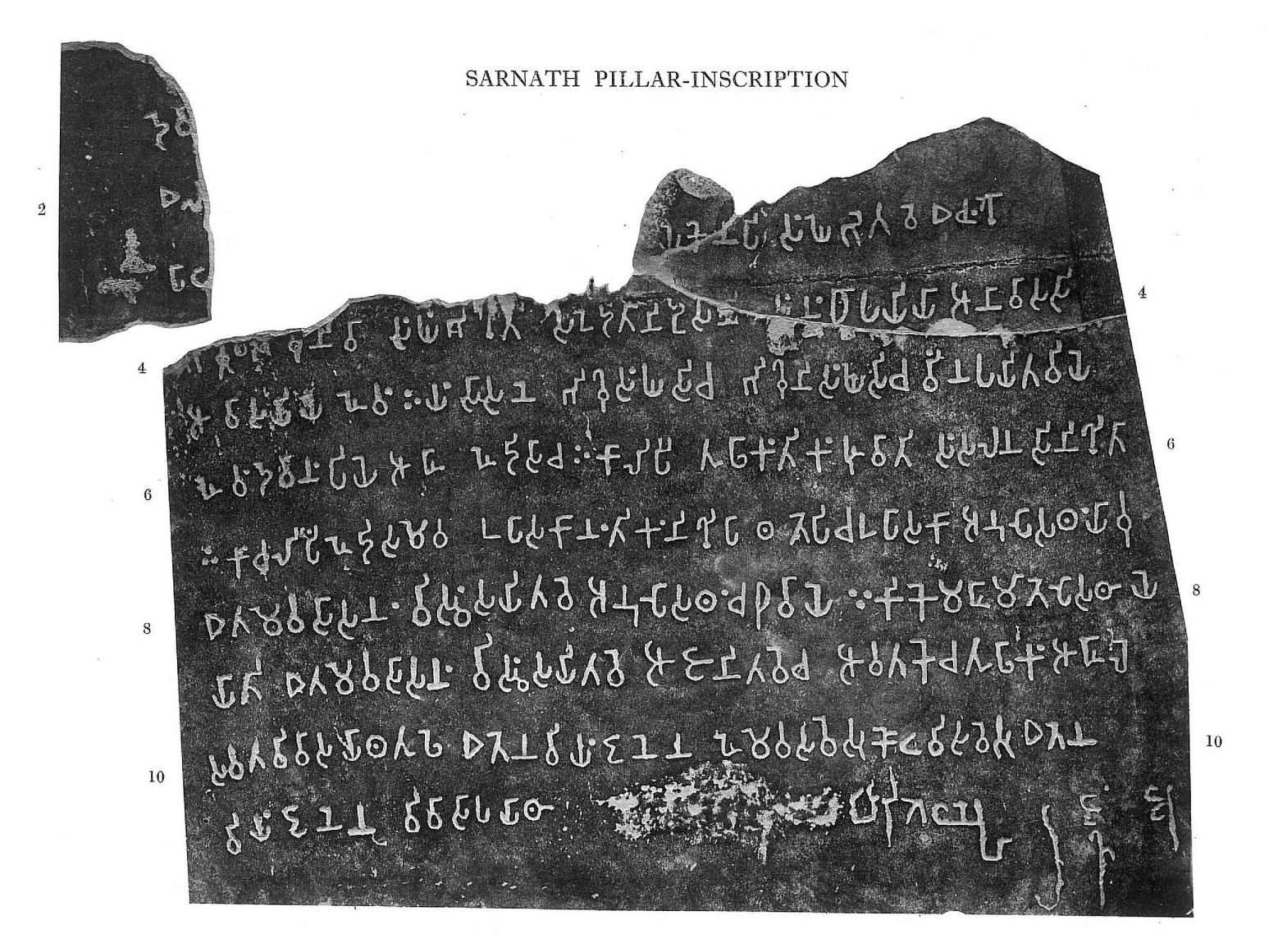
Sarnath Schism Edit.

The Queen's Edict

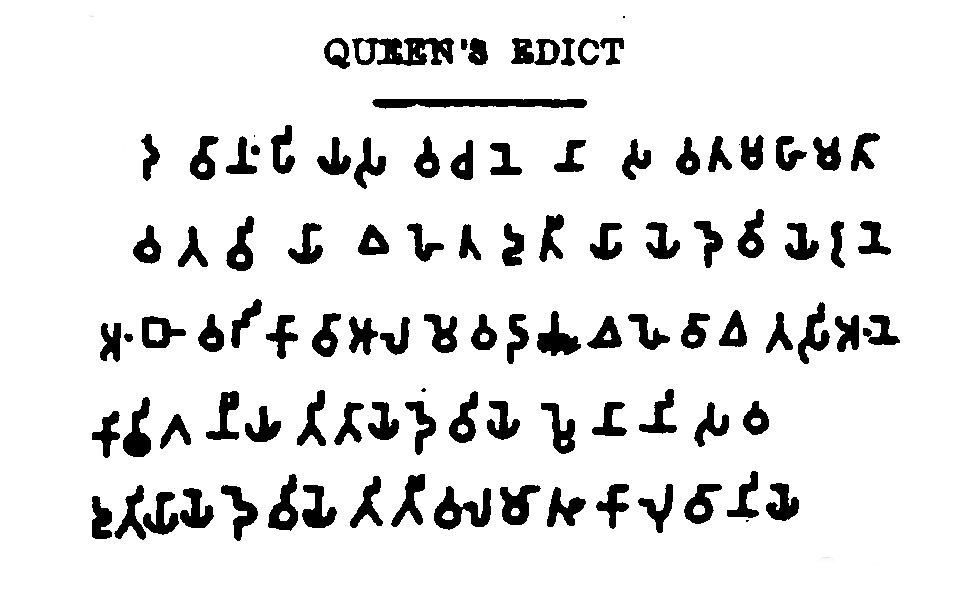
Allahabad, Kosambi pillar, Queen's Edict

Ashoka announces that his second queen should be credited for her gifts. Found on the Allahabad pillar.

"On the order of the Beloved of the Gods, the officers everywhere are to be instructed that whatever may be the gift of the second queen, whether a mango-grove, a monastery, an institution for dispensing charity or any other donation, it is to be counted to the credit of that queen … the second queen, the mother of Tīvala, Kāruvākī."

=== Commemorative inscriptions ===
Although generally catalogued among the "Minor Pillar Edicts", the two inscriptions found in Lumbini and at Nigali Sagar are in the past tense and in the ordinary third person (not the royal third person), suggesting that are not pronouncements of Ashoka himself, but rather later commemorations of his visits in the area. Being commemorative, these two inscriptions may have been written significantly later than the other Ashokan inscriptions.

The Lumbini pillar inscription

Records the visit of Ashoka to Lumbini, location of the birth of the Buddha, in today's Nepal.

Rummindei pillar, inscription of Ashoka
Translation
(English)

When King Beloved of the Gods Priyadarsin had been anointed twenty years, he came himself and worshipped (this spot) because the Buddha Shakyamuni was born here. (He) both caused to be made a stone bearing a horse (?) and caused a stone pillar to be set up, (in order to show) that the Blessed One was born here. (He) made the village of Lummini free of taxes, and paying (only) an eighth share (of the produce).

— The Rummindei Edict, one of the Minor Pillar Edicts of Ashoka.

Transliteration
(original Brahmi script)

𑀤𑁂𑀯𑀸𑀦𑀁𑀧𑀺𑀬𑁂𑀦 𑀧𑀺𑀬𑀤𑀲𑀺𑀦 𑀮𑀸𑀚𑀺𑀦𑀯𑀻𑀲𑀢𑀺𑀯𑀲𑀸𑀪𑀺𑀲𑀺𑀢𑁂𑀦
Devānaṃpiyena Piyadasina lājina vīsati-vasābhisitena
𑀅𑀢𑀦𑀆𑀕𑀸𑀘 𑀫𑀳𑀻𑀬𑀺𑀢𑁂 𑀳𑀺𑀤𑀩𑀼𑀥𑁂𑀚𑀸𑀢 𑀲𑀓𑁆𑀬𑀫𑀼𑀦𑀺𑀢𑀺
atana āgāca mahīyite hida Budhe jāte Sakyamuni ti
𑀲𑀺𑀮𑀸𑀯𑀺𑀕𑀥𑀪𑀺𑀘𑀸𑀓𑀸𑀳𑀸𑀧𑀺𑀢 𑀲𑀺𑀮𑀸𑀣𑀪𑁂𑀘 𑀉𑀲𑀧𑀸𑀧𑀺𑀢𑁂
silā vigaḍabhī cā kālāpita silā-thabhe ca usapāpite
𑀳𑀺𑀤𑀪𑀕𑀯𑀁𑀚𑀸𑀢𑀢𑀺 𑀮𑀼𑀁𑀫𑀺𑀦𑀺𑀕𑀸𑀫𑁂 𑀉𑀩𑀮𑀺𑀓𑁂𑀓𑀝𑁂
hida Bhagavaṃ jāte ti Luṃmini-gāme ubalike kaṭe
𑀅𑀞𑀪𑀸𑀕𑀺𑀬𑁂𑀘
aṭha-bhāgiye ca

— Adapted from transliteration by E. Hultzsch,

Inscription
(Prakrit in the Brahmi script)

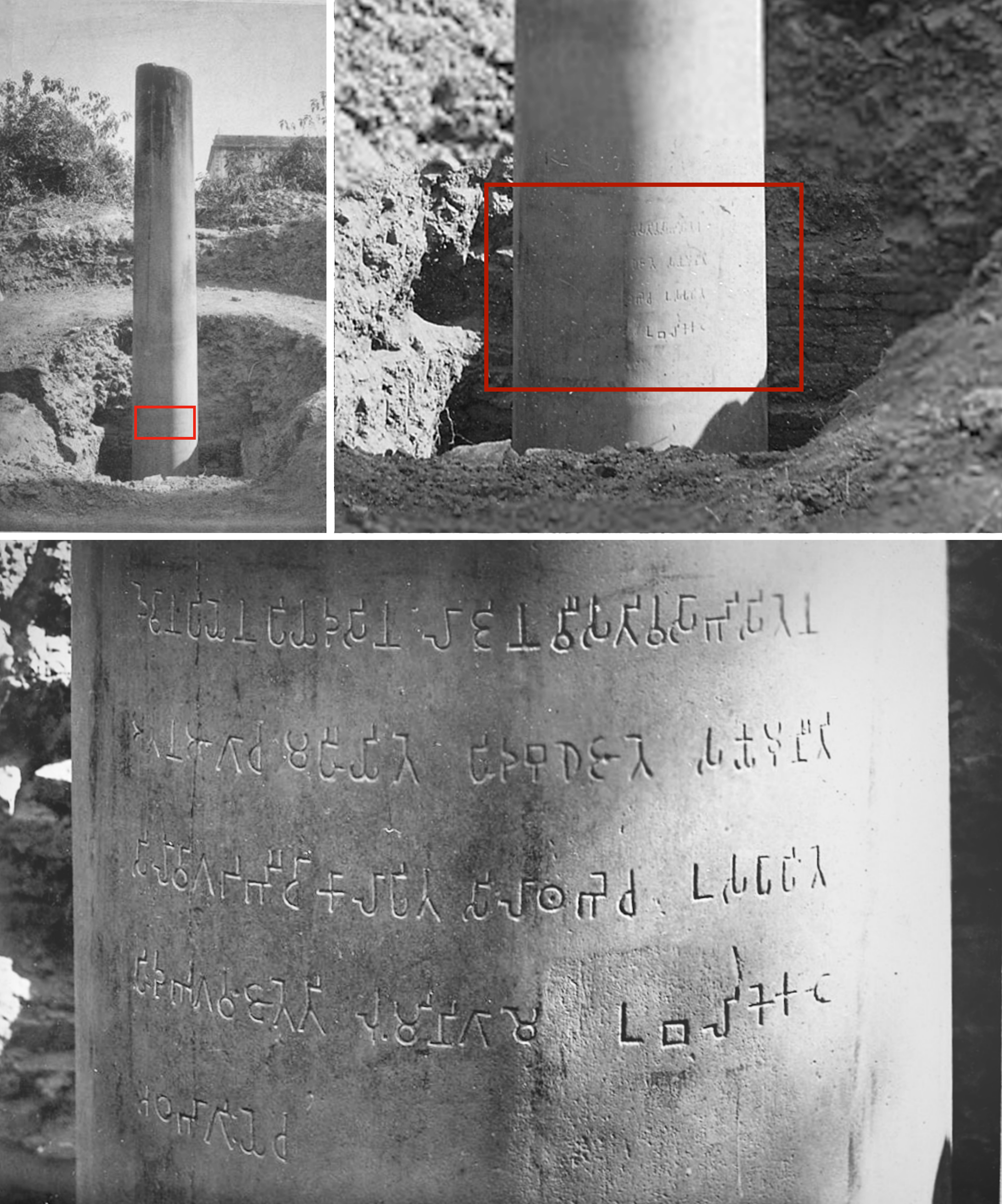
Lumbini Rummindei pillar at time of discovery in 1896, with location of the inscription, which was hidden about 1 meter under ground level.

The Nigali Sagar pillar inscription

At Nigali Sagar, Ashoka mentions his dedication for the enlargement of the Stupa dedicated to the Kanakamuni Buddha.

Nigali Sagar Edict
Translation
(English)

"Beloved of the Gods King Priyadarsin in the 14th year of his reign enlarged for the second time the stupa of the Buddha Kanakamuni and in the 20th year of his reign, having come in person, paid reverence and set up a stone pillar".

Transliteration
(original Brahmi script)

𑀤𑁂𑀯𑀸𑀦𑀁𑀧𑀺𑀬𑁂𑀦 𑀧𑀺𑀬𑀤𑀲𑀺𑀦 𑀮𑀸𑀚𑀺𑀦 𑀘𑁄𑀤𑀲𑀯𑀲𑀸 𑀪𑀺𑀲𑀺𑀢𑁂𑀦
Devānampiyena piyadasina lajina codasavasā bhisitena
𑀩𑀼𑀥𑀲 𑀓𑁄𑀦𑀸𑀓𑀫𑀦𑀲 𑀣𑀼𑀩𑁂𑀤𑀼𑀢𑀺𑀬𑀁 𑀯𑀠𑀺𑀢𑁂
Budhasa Konākamanasa thube-dutyam vaḍhite
𑀯𑀺𑀲𑀢𑀺𑀯 𑀲𑀸𑀪𑀺𑀲𑀺𑀢𑁂𑀦𑀘 𑀅𑀢𑀦 𑀅𑀕𑀸𑀘 𑀫𑀳𑀻𑀬𑀺𑀢𑁂
Visativa sābhisitena–ca atana-agāca-mahīyite
𑀲𑀺𑀮𑀣𑀩𑁂𑀘 𑀉𑀲𑀧𑀧𑀺𑀢𑁂
silathabe-ca usa papite

Inscription
(Prakrit in the Brahmi script)

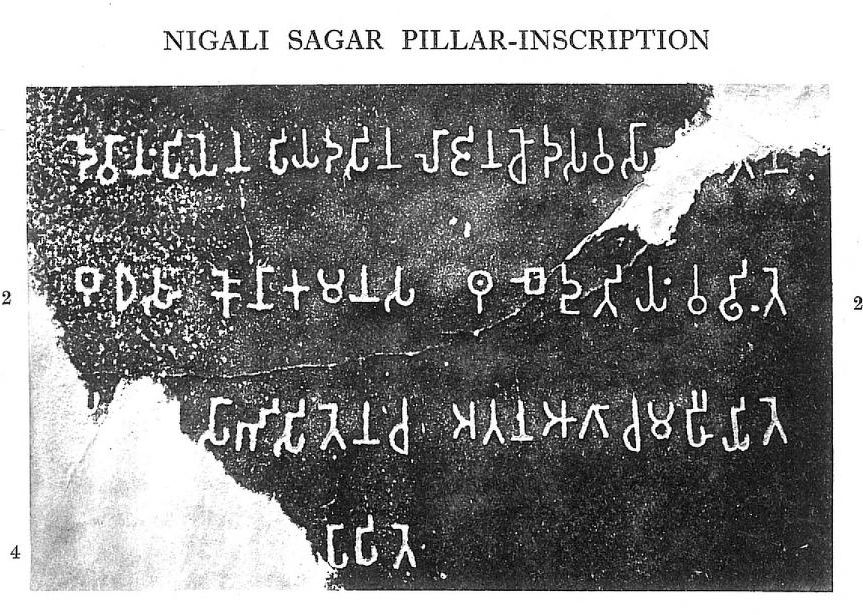
Rubbing of the inscription.

== Inscription techniques ==
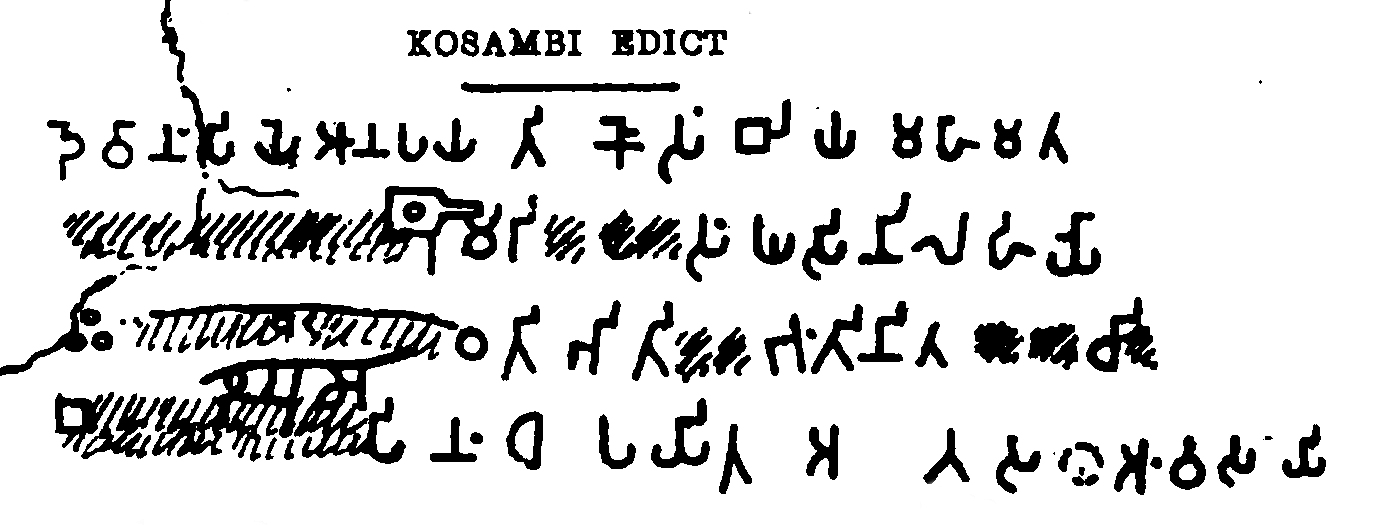
The Kosambi-Allahabad Schism Edict, as the Sarnath or Sanchi Schism Edicts, display low inscriptional skills. They were made by inexperienced Indian engravers at a time when stone engraving was still new in India.

The inscription technique of the early Edicts, particularly the Schism Edcits at Sarnath, Sanchi and Kosambi-Allahabad, is very poor compared for example to the later Major Pillar Edicts, however the Minor Pillar Edicts are often associated with some of the artistically most sophisticated pillar capitals of Ashoka, such as the renowned Lion Capital of Ashoka which crowned the Sarnath Minor Pillar Edict, or the very similar, but less well preserved Sanchi lion capital which crowned the very clumsily inscribed Schism Edict of Sanchi. These edicts were probably made at the beginning of the reign of Ashoka (reigned 262-233 BCE), from the year 12 of his reign, that is, from 256 BCE.

According to Irwin, the Brahmi inscriptions on the Sarnath and Sanchi pillars were made by inexperienced Indian engravers at a time when stone engraving was still new in India, whereas the very refined Sarnath capital itself was made under the tutelage of craftsmen from the former Achaemenid Empire, trained in Perso-Hellenistic statuary and employed by Ashoka. This suggests that the most sophisticated capitals were actually the earliest in the sequence of Ashokan pillars and that style degraded over a short period of time.

The Rummindei and Nigali Sagar edicts, inscribed on pillars erected by Ashoka later in his reign (19th and 20th year) display a high level of inscriptional technique with a good regularity in the lettering.

== Description of the Minor Pillar Edicts ==
The Minor Rock Edicts of Ashoka are exclusively inscribed on some of the Pillars of Ashoka, at Sanchi, Sarnath, Allahabad, Rummindei and Nigali Sagar.

Minor Pillar Edicts of Ashoka
Name	Location	Map	Pillar & inscription	Capital/ Close-up
Sarnath (Lion Capital of Ashoka)	Located in Sarnath, Uttar Pradesh; Schism Edict. Sarnath Schism Edict of Ashoka: ".......... [cannot] be divided. The Samgha both of monks and of nuns is made united as long as (my) sons and great-grandsons (shall reign, and) as long as the moon and the sun (shall shine). The monk or nun who shall break up the Samgha, must be caused to put on white robes and to reside in a non-residence. For my desire is that the Samgha may be united (and) of long duration." — Inscriptions of Asoka. New Edition by E. Hultzsch pp.160-162	Sarnath is located in India		
Sanchi	Located in Sanchi, Madhya Pradesh; Schism Edict. Sanchi Schism Edict of Ashoka: "... path is prescribed both for the monks and for the nuns. As long as (my) sons and great-grandsons (shall reign; and) as long as the Moon and the Sun (shall endure), the monk or nun who shall cause divisions in the Sangha, shall be compelled to put on white robes and to reside apart. For what is my desire ? That the Sangha may be united and may long endure." — Edict of Ashoka on the Sanchi pillar.	Sanchi is located in India		
Allahabad (Kosambi)	Main article: Allahabad pillar Located in Allahabad (originally in Kosambi, Bihar; Schism Edict, Queen's Edict. Several Major Pillar Edicts (1-6) are also inscribed. Allahabad Schism Edict of Ashoka: Beloved of the Gods commands (thus). The Mahamatras of Kosambi.....................................is made united.....................should not be received into the Samgha. And also that monk or nun (who) shall break up the Samgha, should be caused to put on white robes and to reside in a non-residence. Allahabad Queen's Edict: "On the order of the Beloved of the Gods, the officers everywhere are to be instructed that whatever may be the gift of the second queen, whether a mango-grove, a monastery, an institution for dispensing charity or any other donation, it is to be counted to the credit of that queen … the second queen, the mother of Tīvala, Kāruvākī."	Allahabad is located in India		
Rummindei /Paderia	Located in Lumbini, Nepal; Rummindei Edict. Rummindei Edict of Ashoka: When King Beloved of the Gods Priyadarsin had been anointed twenty years, he came himself and worshipped (this spot) because the Buddha Shakyamuni was born here. (He) both caused to be made a stone bearing a horse (?)and caused a stone pillar to be set up, (in order to show) that the Blessed One was born here. (He) made the village of Lummini free of taxes, and paying (only) an eighth share (of the produce). — Ashoka inscription on the Lumbini pillar. The words "Bu-dhe" (Buddha) and "Sa-kya-mu-nī" ("Sage of the Shakyas") in Brahmi script, on Ashoka's Rummindei Minor Pillar Edict (circa 250 BCE).	Lumbini is located in India		
Nigali Sagar	Located in Nigali Sagar, Nepal; Nigali Sagar Edict. Nigali Sagar Edict of Ashoka: "Devanam piyena piyadasin lajina- chodasavasa bhisitena Budhasa Konakamanasa thube-dutyam vadhite Visativa sabhisitena –cha atana-agacha-mahiyite silathabe-cha usa papite" “Beloved of the Gods Priyadarsin in the 14th year of his reign enlarged for the second time the stupa of the Buddha Kanakamuni and in the 20th year of his reign, having come in person, paid reverence and set up a stone pillar”. "Budha-sa Konākamana-sa" ("Of the Kanakamuni Buddha") inscription in the Brahmi Script, at Nigali Sagar, 250 BCE This inscription has the first known instance of the use of the word "Stupa" (here spelled in the Brahmi script as "Thube").	Nigali Sagar is located in India		

== See also ==
Related topics

- Ancient iron production
- Dhar iron pillar
- History of metallurgy in the Indian subcontinent
- Iron pillar of Delhi
- List of Edicts of Ashoka
- Pillars of Ashoka
- Stambha

Other similar topics

- Early Indian epigraphy
- Hindu temple architecture
- History of India
- Indian copper plate inscriptions
- Indian rock-cut architecture
- List of rock-cut temples in India
- Outline of ancient India
- South Indian Inscriptions
- Tagundaing
