= Ajaya: Roll of the Dice =

Book by Anand Neelakantan

Ajaya:Roll of the Dice
- Author: Anand Neelakantan
- Language: English
- Series: Ajaya
- Genre: Mythological fiction
- Published: December 2013
- Publisher: Leadstart Publishing Pvt Ltd
- Publication place: India
- Media type: Print (paperback)
- Pages: 456
- ISBN: 9789383562633
- OCLC: 952942995
- Followed by: Ajaya: Rise of Kali

Ajaya: Roll of the Dice is a 2013 Indian novel of mythological fiction written by Anand Neelakantan. The first installment of the Ajaya series, it tells the story of the Kauravas. As opposed to the usual tale told from the point of view of the victors, this entire story is written from Duryodhana's point view.

== Reception ==
Hindustan Times writes, "Neelakantan got Ravana to steal Rama’s thunder as the hero of the Ramayana. He dismantled long-cherished beliefs of good and evil, questioning the idea of victory and defeat. Asura sold more than a million copies, but Neelakantan is far from finished. Now, Ajaya: Roll Of The Dice, takes on the Mahabharata, this time focusing on the ‘unconquerable’ Kauravas." The Indian Nerve rated it 3.5 out of 5 stating "The simple and gripping writing style coupled with fast-paced story throughout the book is sure to make you enjoy the book."
