= Baahubali: Before the Beginning =

Upcoming Indian streaming television series

- Based on: The Rise of Sivagami; Chaturanga; Queen of Mahishmathi by Anand Neelakantan
- Written by: Deva Katta; Anand Neelakantan
- Directed by: Deva Katta; Praveen Sattaru
- Starring: Wamiqa Gabbi; Rahul Bose; Atul Kulkarni
- Country of origin: India
- Original language: Hindi

Production
- Producers: S. S. Rajamouli; Prasad Devineni
- Editor: Dharmendra Kakarala
- Production companies: Arka Media Works; Netflix

Original release
- Network: Netflix

Related
- Baahubali

Baahubali: Before the Beginning is an unreleased Indian television series based on Anand Neelakantan's 2017 and 2020 novels The Rise of Sivagami, Chaturanga, and Queen of Mahishmathi. A Netflix original and a part of the Bahubali franchise, the series is produced by S. S. Rajamouli and Arka Media Works. The first season was planned to consist nine episodes, and acted as a prequel to Baahubali: The Beginning, following the journey of Sivagami's rise to power in the Mahishmati kingdom.

Before the Beginning was officially announced by Netflix in August 2018. Production began in September 2018 with Deva Katta and Praveen Sattaru as its directors. Mrunal Thakur was cast as Sivagami, who was later replaced by Wamiqa Gabbi. Rahul Bose and Atul Kulkarni play pivotal roles. In March 2021, it is reported that Netflix has revamped the project with a new creative team, scrapping the previously shot version. The series was eventually shelved by Netflix in 2024.

== Premise ==
The series follows Sivagami as she matures from a defiant and resentful girl into a wise queen, around the same time when the kingdom of Mahishmati rises from being a city-state to an influential empire.

== Cast ==
- Wamiqa Gabbi as Sivagami
- Rahul Bose as Skandadasa
- Atul Kulkarni as Pattaraya
- Smaran Sahu as Bijjaladeva
- Malyaban Lahiri as Simuka
- Sahib Verma as Shivappa
- Sunil Palwal as Kattappa
- Siddharth Arora as Mahadeva
- Tej Sapru as Malayappa
- Vir Raj as Amarendra Baahubali
- Siddharth Nagar as Bhallaladeva

Snigdha Akolkar, Vaquar Shaikh, Jameel Khan, Anup Soni and Sonali Khare have been cast in undisclosed roles.

== Production ==
=== Development ===
In March 2017, after the release of The Rise of Sivagami written by Anand Neelakantan, S. S. Rajamouli, the director of the two-part Baahubali films, confirmed that a television series will be made on the novel, comprising 13 episodes. In November 2017, The Hans India reported that Deva Katta would direct a web series based on the world of Mahishmati. In July 2018, Katta confirmed that he will co-direct a three-season Netflix original series, tentatively titled Shivagami. The series, titled Baahubali: Before the Beginning, was announced in a public statement released by Netflix on 1 August 2018. It was to be directed by Katta and Praveen Sattaru; Rajamouli will serve as a producer alongside Prasad Devineni under the Arka Media Works banner. The announcement also revealed that the series was planned to have two seasons.

Baahubali: Before the Beginning was the third Netflix original series announced from India after the crime thriller Sacred Games and horror miniseries Ghoul. Erik Barmack, Vice-President of Netflix International Originals, felt that the theme of Baahubali "resonates globally", one of the reasons for considering the series. On 2 August 2018, a teaser announcing the series was released online by Netflix both on their website and other social media platforms, including YouTube. Rajamouli expressed his enthusiasm for the series, saying, "With Netflix as our partner, we have the opportunity to create a rich and riveting series and take this quintessential Indian epic to the world, which is very gratifying to me as a story-teller". Neelakantan serves as the series' screenwriter. According to the author, it is "the biggest thing Netflix has done in India so far", and is made along the likes of Game of Thrones. He reasoned adapting the novel as a series, stating, "[G]iven the story's dark and violent tone, the current censorship rules won't allow for it to be made as a film". Neelakantan said that part of the series is shot in Kerala and would feature something akin to the now obsolete Mamankam festival. Sattaru stated that unlike the two Baahubali films, the series would not be limited to "a south or north... It's a pan-India series[...]".

=== Filming ===
In September 2018, filming for the series began, with television actress Mrunal Thakur was confirmed to play the role of Sivagami in the series, with Rahul Bose and Atul Kulkarni in pivotal roles. Three sets were erected at locations where the two Baahubali films were filmed. Principal photography was completed in February 2019. In April 2021, Thakur walked out of the project due to scheduling conflicts and was replaced by Wamiqa Gabbi.

In March 2021, Bollywood Hungama reported that Netflix has scrapped the previously shot version after investing ₹100 crore, and new version with a budget of ₹200 crore is planned. The Hans India stated that the revamped version would have a new director and production team. Kunal Deshmukh was reportedly signed as a director but he later opted out.

In January 2022, Variety reported that Netflix was reevaluating the series, and has been "struggling with the project for some time now."

In 2024, the series was permanently shelved by Netflix. While no official reasons have been disclosed for abandoning the series, the makers are reportedly dissatisfied with the visual quality.
