= Karuvaki =

Wife and Second Chief Queen of the emperor Ashoka

- Empress Consort of the Mauryan Empire
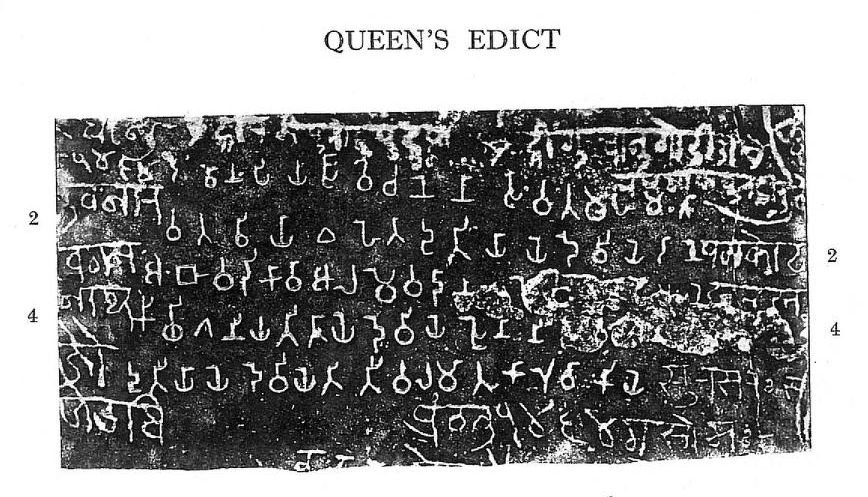
- The "Queen's edict" in Prayagraj mentions the charitable deeds of Karuvaki.
- Born: Kalinga
- Spouse: Ashoka The Great
- Issue: Prince Tivala
- Dynasty: Maurya
- Religion: Buddhism

Karuvaki was the "Second Queen Consort" of the third Mauryan Emperor, Ashoka. She was Ashoka's fourth wife and 2nd Empress consort. She was the mother of Ashoka's fourth son, Prince Tivala.

== Life ==
Karuvaki is mentioned in the Queen Edict wherein her religious and charitable donations were recorded as per her wishes. This gives an image of her being a self-possessed and strong-willed consort, who wanted an act of philanthropy recorded as specifically hers.

The edict also identifies her as mother to their son, Prince Tivala (also referred to as Tivara), who is the only son of Ashoka mentioned by name in his inscriptions.

Despite the fact that Ashoka had many queens, Karuvaki is the only queen of Ashoka who was named in his inscriptions and edicts.

== Queen's Edict ==
The Queen's Edict on the Allahabad Pillar refers to the charitable deeds of Karuvaki:

On the order of the Beloved of the Gods, the officers everywhere are to be instructed that whatever may be the gift of the second queen, whether a mango-grove, a monastery, an institution for dispensing charity or any other donation, it is to be counted to the credit of that queen ... the second queen, the mother of Tīvala, Karuvakī.

== In popular culture ==
- Karuvaki was portrayed by Kareena Kapoor in the 2001 Bollywood film, Aśoka.
- Saumya Seth portrays Karuvaki in Colors TV's 2015 historical drama, Chakravartin Ashoka Samrat while Reem Sheikh portrays the young Karuvaki.
- She is the main character of The Ashoka Trilogy, The Prince of Pataliputra by Shreyas Bhave.
- Kalinga Karuvaki Award established by Kalinga Literary Festival to honour the great warrior princess of Kalinga
- Mallika Singh portrays Karuvaki in Ekta Kapoor's historical drama series Pracchand Ashok on Colors TV.

== Sources ==
- Bhandarkar, D. R. (1925). Ashoka. Asian Educational Services. p. 336. ISBN 8120613333. * Smith, Vincent Arthur (1920). Ashoka, the Buddhist Emperor of India. Asian Educational Services. pp. 215–219. ISBN 8120613031.
