= Haraprasad Das =

Indian poet from Odisha

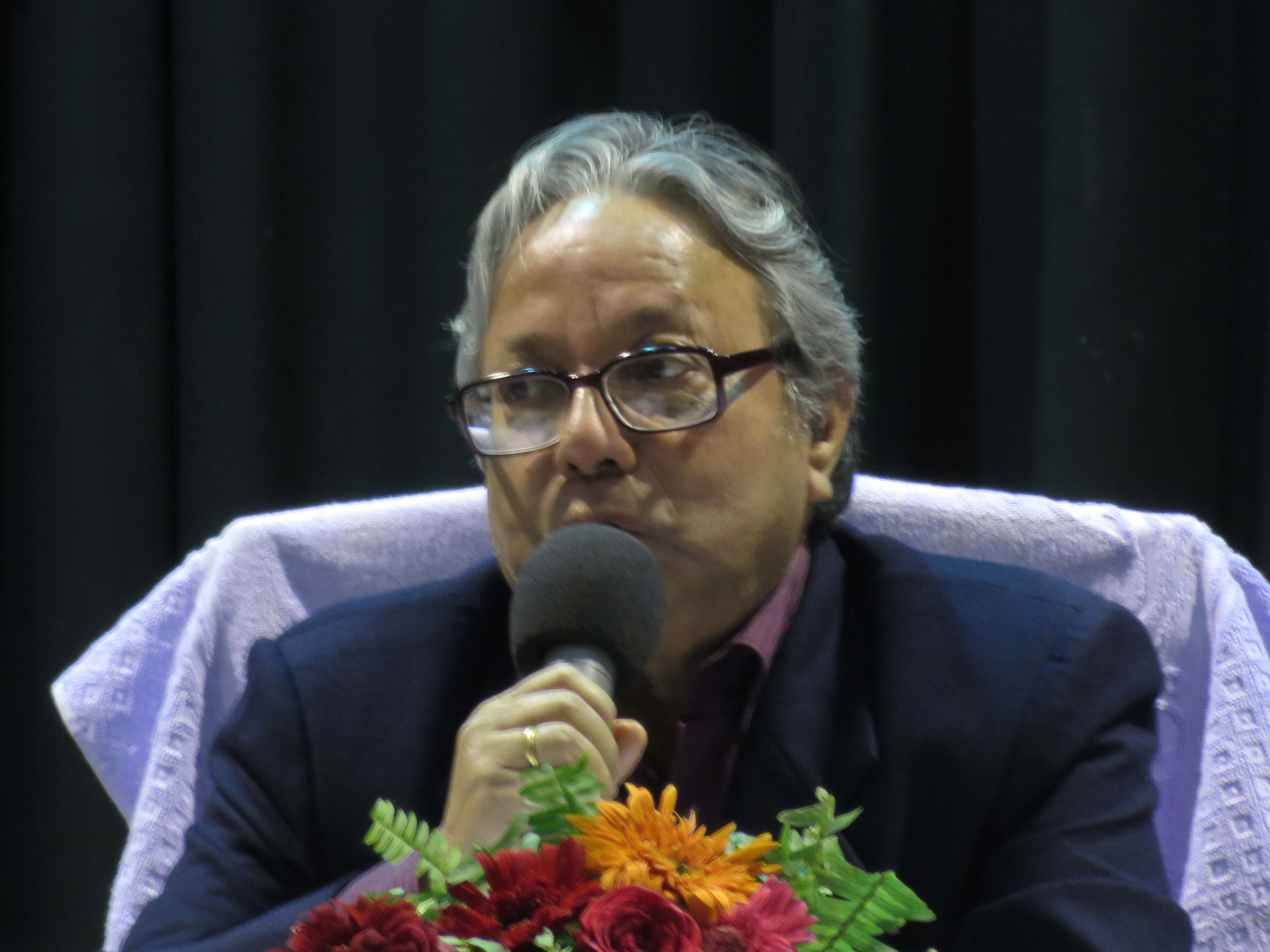
- Haraprasad Das at Odia Wikisource Sabha 2014, Bhubaneswar
- Born: 15 January 1946 (age 80); Banapur, Odisha
- Occupation: Poet
- Writing career
- Language: Odia
- Notable work: Vamsha
- Notable awards: Sahitya Akademi Award (1999)
- Website: haraprasaddas.in

Haraprasad Das (born 15 January 1946) is an Odia language poet, essayist and columnist. Das has twelve works of poetry, four of prose, three translations and one piece of fiction to his credit.

Haraprasad is a retired civil servant. He has served various UN bodies as an expert.

== Awards ==
He is a recipient of numerous awards and recognitions including

- Kalinga Literary Award, 2017, Kalinga Literary Festival
- Moortidevi Award, 2013
- Gangadhar Meher Award, 2008
- Kendra Sahitya Akademi Award, 1999
- Sarala Award, 2008
