= KLF Book Awards =

Indian book awarding

The KLF Book Awards
- Awarded for: contribution to Indian literature
- Country: India
- Presented by: Kalinga Literary Festival
- First award: 2021

The KLF Book Awards, founded in 2021, is a literary honor in India, presented and established by the Kalinga Literary Festival. The awards are given in various categories including fiction and non-fiction books, poetry, Hindi language books, books in translation, Bhasa first book, business and strategic affairs books, environmental books, biographical and autobiographical books, children books, sports, lifestyle and emerging trend books.

== History ==
The KLF Book Awards was established in 2021 by the Kalinga Literary Festival. The awards for the years 2020-21 were announced in September 2021, and 47 authors were selected for the award.

The awards are given in various categories including fiction and non-fiction books, poetry, Hindi language books, books in translation, Bhasa first book, business and strategic affairs books, environmental books, biographical and autobiographical books, children books, sports, lifestyle and emerging trend books. The purpose of the award, according to festival director Rashmi Ranjan Parida, is "to contribute to debates and discourses in the national and global public sphere and encourage more thoughtful, reflective, unique and inspiring contributions".

The awards for 2020-21 will be awarded at Kalinga Literary Festival which is set to be held from 10 to 12 December 2021 in Bhubaneswar.

== List of winners ==
=== 2020-21 ===
KLF Fiction Book of the Year Award

- Undertow, Jahnavi Barua
- Betrayed by Hope: A Play on the Life of Michael Madhusudan Dutt, Namita Gokhale and Malashri Lal
- The Begum and the Dastan, Tarana Husain Khan
- The Vault of Vishnu, Ashwin Sanghi
- Undercover in Bandipore, Ashok Kaul

KLF Non-fiction Book of the Year Award

- Princestan: How Nehru, Patel and Mountbatten Made India, Sandeep Bamzai
- The New World Disorder, Shashi Tharoor & Samir Saran
- Jugalbandi: The BJP Before Modi, Vinay Sitapati
- The Great Hindu Civilisation: Achievement, Neglect, Bias and the Way Forward, Pavan K Varma
- A Brief History of Mrdangam Makers, T M Krishna
- The Death Script, Ashutosh Bhardwaj
- Reporting India, Prem Prakash

KLF Poetry Book of the Year Award

- A Poem a Day, Gulzar
- Kalidasa: Meghduta-The Cloud Messenger & Kalidasa: Ritusamhara-The Six Seasons (Jointly), Abhay K.
- From Castleford to Kathmandu, Greta Rana
- Anek Pal Aaur Mai, Basant Chaudhary

KLF Hindi Book of the Year Award

- Khela, Neelakshi Singh
- Kulbhooshan Ka Naam Darj Kijiye, Alka Saraogi
- Ravi Katha: Andaaz-E-Bayan Urf Ravi Katha, Mamta Kalia
- Wah Ustad, Praveen Kumar Jha
- Ek Desh Barah Duniya, Shirish Khare

KLF Book in Translation of the Year Award

- Estuary, Perumal Murugan, tr. Nandini Krishnan

KLF Bhasa Award

- The Runaway Boy, Manoranjan Byapari

KLF Debut Book Award

- I Am No Messiah, Sonu Sood and Meena Iyer

KLF Business Book of the Year Award

- Getting Competitive: A Practitioner’s Guide for India, R. C. Bhargava
- Overdraft, Urjit Patel
- Pandemonium: The Great Indian Banking Tragedy, Tamal Bandyopadhyay

KLF Diplomacy/Strategic Affairs Book of the Year Award

- The India Way: Strategies for an Uncertain World, S. Jaishankar
- Powershift: India-China Relations in a Multipolar World, Zorawar Daulet Singh
- Himalayan Challenge: India, China and the Quest for Peace, Subramanian Swamy

KLF Environmental Book of the Year Award

- Hari Bhari Ummid& The Chipko Movement: A People's History, Shekhar Pathak
- Jungle Nama, Amitav Ghosh

KLF Women/Dalit/Tribal/Minorities Literature Award

- Harijan: A Novel, Gopinath Mohanty (tr. Bikram Das)
- Makers of Modern Dalit History, Sudarshan Ramabadran and Guru Prakash Paswan
- A Plate of White Marble (Shwet Patharer Thala) by Bani Basu (tr. Nandini Guha)
- Ramvilas Paswan: Sankalp, Sahas aaur Sangharsh, Pradeep Srivastav
- Sir Syed Ahmad Khan: Reason, Religion and Nation, Shafey Kidwai

KLF Biography/Autobiography Book of the Year Award

- His Holiness the Fourteenth Dalai Lama: An Illustrated Biography, Tenzin Geyche Tethong
- Restless as Mercury: My Life as a Young Man Mohandas Karamchand Gandhi, Gopalkrishna Gandhi
- Akhtari: The Life and Music of Begum Akhtar, Yatindra Mishra
- Bharat Ke Pradhan Mantri, Rasheed Kidwai
- The House of Jaipur: The Inside Story of India’s Most Glamorous Royal Family, John Zubrzycki

KLF Children Book of the Year Award

- Miracle at Happy Bazaar: My Best Stories for Children, Ruskin Bond
- Grandparents' Bag of Stories, Sudha Murthy

KLF Sports Book of the Year Award

- The Commonwealth of Cricket, Ramachandra Guha

KLF Lifestyle and Emerging Trend Book Award

- Eating in the Age of Dieting, Rujuta Diwekar

=== 2022 ===
KLF Book Awards 2022,

KLF Non-fiction Book Award 2022: -Sanjeev Sanyal’s- Revolutionaries: The Other Story of How India Won its Freedom - Akshaya Mukul’s- Writer, Rebel, Soldier, Lover: The Many Lives of Agyeya Kailash Satyarthi’s - Tum Pehle Kyon Nahi Aaye – Akhilesh’s - AKS –

KLF Fiction Book Award 2022: -Navtej Sarna’s Crimson Spring) -Pravin Kumar’s Amar Desva

KLF Poetry Book Award 2022 -Ranjit Hoskote’s - Hunchprose -Pankaj Chaturvedi’s -Aakash Mein Ardhachandra

KLF Business Book Award 2022 -Piyush Pandey’s Open House

KLF Debut Book Award 2022 -Farah Bashir’s - Rumours of Spring -Sumit Sharma Sameer’s Wake Up Ali…Wake Up Now (Fiction, Vitasta) - Pradeep Baishakh Faces of Inequality: Stories of the poor and underprivileged from India’s grassroots

KLF Women/Dalit/Tribal/Minorities Literature Award 202 -Machhliyan Gayengi Ek Din Pandumgeet- Poonam Vasam (Vani Prakashan)

KLF Children Book Award 2022 -Zarin Virji’s - Gopal’s Gully

KLF Lifestyle/Biography/Environment & Emerging Trend Book Award - Bimal Prasad & Sujata Prasad’s, The Dream of Revolution: A Biography of Jayaprakash Narayan - Hindol Sengupta’s Sing, Dance and Pray: The Inspirational Story of Srila Prabhupada Founder-Acharya of ISKCON - Satyajit Ray Miscellany: On Life, Cinema, People & Much More - Abhay K- The Book of Bihari Literature-Edited- - Rama Shanker Singh - Nadi Putra

KLF Book in Translation Award 2022 -JADUNAMA: Javed Akhtar's Journey (English) by Arvind Mandloi Translated by Dr Rakhshanda Jalil- - The Bride: The Maithili Classic Kanyadan By Harimohan Jha Translated by Lalit Kumar

KLF Bhasha Book Award 2022 -Nepali: Ranjana Niraula- Anubhuti Ko Awataran – Kathmandu- Nepal -Maithili: Mahendra Malangia’s- Dak, Ghagh aa Bhaddari -Kannada: Srinivasa Murthy N.S.’s Shilpakala Devaaalayakke Daari – Kamla Enterprises, Bangalore -Odia: KamlaKant Mohapatra’s- Bou Hajila O Milia- 4Corners, Bhubneshwar -Malayalam: K. R. Meera- Qabar

=== 2023 ===
3rd KLF Book Awards

From 2024, Kalinga Literary Festival change the format of KLF Book Awards. First they announced Long List, then Short List and in last winner of the Book Awards.

Non-fiction: -'Caste Pride: Battles for Equality in Hindu India by Manoj Mitta (Context by Westland)

Fiction: -This Is Salvaged: Stories by Vauhini Vara (HarperCollins Publishers India)

Poetry: -My Invented Land : New and Selected Poems by Robin S. Ngangom (Speaking Tiger)

Business: -Climate Capitalism: Winning the Global Race to Zero Emissions by Akshat Rathi, John Murray (Hachette UK)

Translation: -A Woman Burnt by Imayam (Author), GJV Prasad (Translator) (Simon & Schuster India)

Debut: -The Day I Became a Runner: A Women's History of India through the Lens of Sport by Sohini Chattopadhyay, Fourth Estate India (HarperCollins India)

Children: -When Fairyland Lost Its Magic by Bijal Vachharajani, Rajiv Eipe, Harper Children’s (HarperCollins India)

=== 2024 ===
4th KLF Book Awards

Kalinga Literary Festival conferred annual Kalinga Literary Festival Book Awards 2024 to the winners across various categories of Hindi and English Litearture. Union Tourism and Culture Minister Gajendra Singh Shekhawat conferred the KLF Book Awards to the all winners. The winners were awarded a cash prize of Rs 1 lakh each, along with a trophy and citation at a function held on February 15, 2025, at the India Inter-national Centre (IIC), New Delhi.

KLF Book Awards English categories winners

Non-Fiction - Tipu Sultan: The Saga of Mysore's Interregnum (1760-1799) – Writer Dr. Vikram Sampath - publisher Penguin & The Sherpa Trail: Stories from Darjeeling and Beyond – Writer Nandini Purandare, Deepa Balsavar – publisher Roli Books

Fiction - The Girl with the Seven Lives - writer Vikas Swarup – publisher Simon & Schuster & The Enclave : A Sharp and Hilarious Portrait of Womanhood in India - Writer – Rohit Manchanda -publisher Harper Collins

Poetry - I’ll Have It Here – Poet Jeet Thayil – publisher HarperCollins

Business - Digital Fortunes: A Value Investor’s Guide to the New Economy – Writer Smarak Swain – publisher Bloomsbury India

Translation- Ten Days of the Strike: Selected Stories – By Sandipan Chattopadhyay, translated from Bengali by Arunava Sinha – publisher HarperCollins

Debut- The Many Lives of Syeda X : The Story of an Unknown Indian – Writer Neha Dixit – publisher Juggernaut

Children- Laxmi Panda: The Story of Netaji's Youngest Spy – Writer Savie Karnel – publisher Westland

KLF Book Awards Hindi categories winners

Non-Fiction - Over The Top : OTT ka Mayajaal Book – Writer Anant Vijay – Publisher Prabhat Prakashan

Fiction- Vanya – writer Manisha Kulsherstha – Publisher Rajpal And Sons Kissagram, Prabhat Ranjan, Rajpal And Sons

Poetry - Dharm Wah Naav Nahin – Poet Shirish Kumar Maurya Publisher Rajkamal Prakashan

Translation - Charu, Chivar Aur Charya –By Pradeep Das- Translator- Sujata Shiven publisher Penguin

Debut- Chakka Jaam- writer Gautam Choubey publisher Rajkamal Prakashan
