= The Rise of Sivagami =

2017 novel by Anand Neelakantan

- Author: Anand Neelakantan
- Language: English
- Series: Baahubali
- Genre: Historical fiction/Fantasy
- Published: 7 March 2017
- Publisher: Westland Books
- Publication place: India
- Media type: Print (paperback)
- Pages: 492
- ISBN: 9789386224446
- OCLC: 987429288

The Rise of Sivagami is an Indian historical fiction novel written by Anand Neelakantan. It acts as a prequel to the film Baahubali: The Beginning. It was originally released in English on 7 March 2017, with Telugu, Malayalam, Hindi and Tamil versions released in April 2017.

The story revolves around Sivagami, a character of Baahubali. The novel is intended to extrapolate the Baahubali films. It also tells the readers more about Kattappa, another important character of the story.

== Plot ==
Sivagami hates the royal family of Mahishmati because their king, Somadeva, executed her father, Devaraya. She was informed that her father had left behind a book which held certain secrets, upon which she retrieved it from her father's house accompanied by her foster brother Raghava, who reveals that the book is written in Paisachi, an ancient language of Mahishmati. He proclaims his love for her, but Sivagami rejects his advances. He promises to find an empire more powerful than Mahishmati to help overthrow it. Her foster father, Thimma, who raised her for 12 years after Devaraya's death, drops her off at the royal orphanage for a grave reason. On the way, Sivagami attempts to run away, but is followed by her foster sister Akhila who gets into a scuffle with a man for her pouch of pebbles. Thimma later kills the man.

Kattappa and Shivappa are the sons of Malayappa, an experienced slave to the royal family. On a hunting party they go with the sons of Somadeva - Bijjaladeva and Mahadeva. Bijjaladeva, being the eldest, shows bravery but is corrupt, rude, brutal and heartless towards people who worked in Mahishmati. Mahadeva is sincere but weak at heart. Bijjala hits Kattappa, Shivappa in turn hurts Bijjala. His father punishes him, but Bijjala comments that the punishment given was not enough and pursues Shivappa, who leads him into a trap. Kattappa saves him and is promoted by Somadeva to the position of the Sevaka (English: servant) of Bijjala.

Parameshwara, the Mahapradhana (English: prime minister), is informed by the head blacksmith Dhamaka that they were short of Gaurikanta, a special stone derived from the volcano Gauriparvat, which is used to obtain the alloy Gauridhooli. When mixed with metal weapons, it makes the wielder invincible. A young blacksmith complaints about a leak to Parameshwara. Later, Parameshwara secretly tells his assistant Roopaka that the leak should be fixed for security, and that a blacksmith was missing, along with six Gaurikanta stones.

Pattaraya, the Bhoomipathi (English: executioner), a corrupt official, receives a message from Rudra Bhatta, the Rajguru (English: royal advisor), that the blacksmith Nagayya, who stole the stones and went missing was making a lot of demands, including safe passage to Kadarimandalam with his wife and son. Nagayya says that he will not work on the stones until his family is with him. Pratapa, the Dandanayaka (police chief) kicked him and takes the stones from him. Nagayya retaliates using his hammer, takes the stones and runs away. In the hustle that followed, a stone fell to the ground which was retrieved by Pattaraya, who hides it. Pratapa orders his men to search for Nagayya.

Parameshwara reports to the king that the blacksmith was found dead with another man and the stones were still missing. He doubts whether Thimma will be up to task due to his closeness with Devaraya. Parameshwara says that he was admitting the daughter of Devaraya into the royal orphanage and demanded an audience with the king. Thimma requests that Sivagami stay in the royal orphanage until she is eighteen, which is a few months away. The king agrees, although he comments that they are harbouring a snake. He retires to the Antapura, where Senapati Hiranya informs him that Mahadeva was beaten by Shivappa and his performance was unsatisfactory. Sivagami notices that Mahadeva was really tall, handsome and a gorgeous prince. Mahadeva blushes when he notices Sivagami looking at her. Shivappa is scolded and beaten by Malayappa for defeating Mahadeva and says that slaves should know their place and not challenge princes. Shivappa talks with her lover and later tells Kattappa that he will marry her. He manages to fool Kattappa and run away.

The eunch Keki, the employee of Kalika, teases Kattappa when visiting Bijjala. The two of them move out of the palace, followed by Kattappa, who has to do his duty. Keki leads Bijjala to Brihannala, another eunuch, who gives him the clothes of a merchant to disguise himself. Keki bribes the guards and smuggles Bijjala out of the palace. Brihannala turns into a man Dananjaya in his private chamber. He tells his adopted brother that he will turn into a man only after destroying Mahishmati and tells him that their mother Achi Nagamma did not reveal what she suffered to Nala as he was only adopted.

Parameshwara meets Sivagami, who is impressed by his collection of books. She is surprised that there was never a female Mahapradhana.

Later, the book comes in the hand of Skandadasa, through the head of Royal orphanage Revamma. Skandadasa was the Upapradhana of Mahishmati. He warns Sivagami that the book was gone missing twelve years back from the Royal library. If proof turns up, then it might turn up that Devaraya stole it from the Royal library. Skandadasa even suggested Sivagami run away in turn someone discovers it. But, Sivagami was sure that her father never did anything wrong and decided to stay put and work on her mission. She even decides to steal the book from Skandadasa's office.

Katappa enters the forest to find Shivappa. He is found and arrested by the Vaithailis. They take him to Bhutaraya, leader of the Vaithailis. Shivappa is there willingly, as one of the soldiers in Bhutaraya's army. Bhutaraya calls himself as the true king of Mahismati. Mahishmati was once ruled by a tribal group called The Vaithailis. The story was told to Kattappa by the Vaithailis head Bhutaraya who reveals to Kattappa that it was one of his ancestors who deceived them. They provided shelter to Uthama Varma, who stole the secret Uthama Varma chases the Vaithailis into the forest using Gaurikanta and captures the Mahishmati kingdom.

He knew the loose character of his elder brother yet, he never revealed it to his mother Queen Hemavati who called her elder son 'a rogue' and her younger son 'a coward'. Bijjala loathed Mahadeva but, Somadeva always praised Mahadeva and took all types of suggestions regarding royal matters from him even though everyone knew he was weak at heart and even got beaten by a slave Shivappa - the brother of slave Kattappa. Mahadeva helplessly falls in love with Sivagami and proposed her to marry. But, Sivagami laughs at him and even pities him. Mahadeva gets hurt by the response of Sivagami and feels the urge to commit suicide. But, the dreadful fate of Mahishmathi leads him to take an extra step and he fights with Shivappa who was one of the Vaithailis. The Vaithailis attack the royal palace. Mahadeva defends his kingdom and begets the title of Vikramadeva. Sivagami comes across a lots of mishaps on the day of the Mahamukum festival which was held for nine days. She tries to steal the book of her father from the office of Skandadasa who was then Mahapradhana but, end up watching Skandadasa getting killed by then corrupt officials Bhoomipathi Pattaraya, Rajaguru Rudra Bhatta and Dandanayaka Pratapa. This shocks her to the core and she realises that it was not only her father but, all the honest people in Mahishmati get assassinated for some reason or the other. She later gets chased by Dandanayaka Pratapa and ends up reaching the second floor of Antapura - the Royal Harem. There she got the golden chance of killing the King. But, things did not turn out to be as it was thought or planned. Though some of the tricks were played by Brihannala, the eunuch. Brihannala was the head of Royal Harem. She was the one who brought up the bravery of Sivagami in front of King Somadeva's eyes. Somadeva chops off the head of Bhutaraya - the leader of the Vaithailis. On the other hand, Shivappa gets imprisoned by Kattappa himself who hands him over to King Somadeva as a traitor of the country. Sivagami, who arrived at Mahishmati with the intention to kill Somadeva, was praised as she had bravely killed the king's assassin and received the title of Bhoomipathi - the executioner. For unsuspecting Sivagami, the first execution she is to carry out is of her foster father Thimma. It was suspected from the words being shared between Somadeva and Sivagami was that Thimma might have been one of the members of Vaithailis. So, she needs to start her job by executing him. The story ends with a cliffhanger.

== Sequel ==
Chaturanga was announced on 25 July 2020. It was scheduled for release on 6 August 2020.

== Reception ==
The Rise of Sivagami received generally positive reviews. The Indian Express wrote, "Despite its flaws, the book cobbles together enough good elements by the end for readers and especially for fans of the movie to await the next installment." The Hindu wrote, "Matching the film, the book too has grand portrayal of the era, places, people, culture and customs it depicts." The book has also been reviewed by The New Indian Express, Firstpost and India TV.

== See also ==
- Baahubali: Before the Beginning
- Queen of Mahishmathi
- Baahubali (franchise)
