= Ajaya: Rise of Kali =

Book by Anand Neelakantan

- Author: Anand Neelakantan
- Language: English
- Series: Ajaya
- Genre: Mythological fiction
- Published: 21 June 2015
- Publisher: Leadstart Publishing
- Publication place: India
- Media type: Print (paperback)
- Pages: 530
- ISBN: 9789381576045
- OCLC: 919909696
- Preceded by: Ajaya: Roll of the Dice

Ajaya: Rise of Kali is a 2015 Indian novel of mythological fiction written by Anand Neelakantan. The second installment of the Ajaya series, it tells the story of the Kauravas. As opposed to the usual tale told from the point of view of the victors, this entire story is written from Duryodhana's view. It was originally released in English on 21 June 2015 in Hyderabad by the celebrity couple Nagarjuna and Amala.

== Reception ==
The Financial Express writes, "The author takes on the mantle of putting things in a different perspective and adding newer dimensions to the prism of dharma, the effort becomes quite commendable". The Indian Nerve rated it 4.5 out of 5 stating "Highly recommended for everyone who love reading Indian stories portrayed in very refreshing light".

== See also ==
- Kali (demon)
