= Chaturanga (Neelakantan novel) =

Historical fiction novel

- First edition
- Author: Anand Neelakantan
- Language: English
- Series: Baahubali
- Genre: Historical fiction/Fantasy
- Published: 6 August 2020
- Publisher: Westland Books
- Publication place: India
- Media type: Print (paperback)
- Pages: 320
- ISBN: 9789389152449
- OCLC: 9389152445

Chaturanga (transl. Chess) is an Indian historical fiction novel written by Anand Neelakantan. It acts as a prequel to the film Baahubali: The Beginning and sequel to the book The Rise of Sivagami. It was originally released in English on 6 August 2020, Hindi, Telugu, and Tamil versions are scheduled to release.

== Plot ==
The prologue of the novel starts with how Sivagami's parents were killed a day before her fifth birthday, 13 years ago. In the present day, after a failed coup by the Vaithalikas (immediately after the incidents of the first book). Sivagami was unintentionally elevated to the position of bhoomipathi (transl. executioner) is given the orders to execute her foster father Thimma, who was suspected to be a Vaitlikas warrior. Sivagami stages a duel with her foster father and planned on assassinating Maharaja Somadeva. During the dual, Thimma, the ex-commander in chief who can read people's body language, attempts to kill the king but fails due to Kattapa's save. Sivagami is forced to kill Thimma and she is praised by the Kingdom.

Kattapa alongside his father Malayappa digs up Shivappa's grave and finds him alive, Shivappa accidentally fatally hits his father with a shovel and Shivappa runs away. Brihannala helps Kattapa make it look like Malayappa committed suicide due to Shivappa's fake death. Kattapa is now looking for Shivappa. Shivappa is made the new leader of the Vaitlikas and alongside Brihannala and Neelappa (who was Devaraya's former slave) plan to kill Kattapa. Bjjaladeva is given the mission to find where Pattaraya had gone, he goes alongside Keki who instructs him to start being nice to the public so Bjjaladeva could win the throne. Bjjaladeva finds Pattaraya with his daughter Mekhala, Mekhala can seduce Bjjaladeva and Pattaraya promises Bjjaladeva that he will be the future king. They kill an innocent slave which is brought back to Bjjaladeva to Mahishmati who falsely says this was Pattaraya's corpse.

Mahadeva affectionates slowly start working with Sivagamai as the two spend more time together. Ally meets Gundu Ramu who tells her to tell Sivagami that he was alive, she vows to do so. Jeemotha unsuccessfully enslaves Hidumba's enslaved children. Kattapa is given a few days of freedom by Maharaja Somadeva and he pursues his journey in finding Shivappa. Shivappa flees the village and his assistant Malla when Kattappa enters the village. Ally can give the message from Gundu Ramu to Sivagami and she is assigned to kill Kattappa by Brinhalla, she then exposes that she is in love with Kattapa. She exposes her feeling to Kattapa who then loved her back as well, however, she is remorseful that she was failing this mission of killing Kattapa and stages that Malla is her true dad. She then kills Malla and asks Kattapa to bring the body to her native village to the last rites of Malla. Shivappa is knocked out and made unconscious, his body is then secretly switched with Malla. They then go past the river where Ally is deciding if she should kill Kattappa right there and then.

Sivagmai learns about how Rhudra Bhatta (the head priest) is sacrificing innocent children. She decides to stop him alongside Rhudra Bhatta's daughter-in-law Gomati. It is stated before Shivappa was knocked out unconscious, he hid in the attic of the orphanage. Moreover, rumors started to spread that he was a ghost. He is nearly caught but successfully escapes but is then knocked out. Rhudra Bhatta decides to sacrifice Akhila for his next ritual with Prine Bjjaladeva. Pattaraya alongside his daughter goes to the vassal state of Kandaraimadalam where he meets his lover and the biological mother of Mekhala, the imprisoned queen Chitraveni. Chitraveni promises to marry Pattaraya if he could get some Gaurikanta stones, which was the main reason for Mahishmati's sudden rise. It is told that Mahishmati was also formerly a vassal state of Kandaraimandalam. Pattaraya sends his daughter Mekhala to kill the governor, Mekhala fails and she is sent to work in the harem of puppet ruler King Narasimha.

Sivagami confronts Rhudra Bhatta who tells her the real story of Devaraya (Sivagami's father). It is said that slaves used to mine the Amma Gauri mountain which got them Gaurikanta stones. Gaurikanta stones helped Mahishmati rise but people believed Amma Gauri was mad that people were mining her mountain. Somadeva publicly promised to stop the mining in the Amma Gauri mountain and everyone start praying to Amma Gauri mountain. He deceived his people and made innocent children mine the mountains. Devaraya found this out and threatened to tell the people, Somadeva then got Devaraya executed and called him a traitor. Sivagami after hearing the story realized Rhudra Bhatta's son and Prince Bjjaladeva were coming so she kidnapped Rhudra Bhatta and held him hostage in a warehouse. Prince Mahadeva had followed Bjjaladeva and Bjjaladeva had to act like they were trying to get Rhudra Bhatta. Mahadeva finds Akhilla and rescues her. Gundu Ramu tries numerous attempts to escape Hidumba but fails until he is saved a befriended by Vamana. Sivagami burns Rhudra Bhatta alive but not before Rhudra Bhatta cursing her that she'll be betrayed by her husband and son. Mahadeva alongside his men catches Sivagami burning Rhudra Bhatta and orders her to be arrested.

== See also ==
- Baahubali: Before the Beginning
- The Rise of Sivagami
- Queen of Mahishmathi
- Baahubali (franchise)
