= Queen of Mahishmathi =

Historical fiction novel

Queen of Mahismati
- First edition
- Author: Anand Neelakantan
- Language: English
- Series: Baahubali
- Genre: Historical fiction/Fantasy
- Published: 28 December 2020
- Publisher: Westland Books
- Publication place: India
- Media type: Print (paperback)
- Pages: 560
- ISBN: 9789389648720
- OCLC: 9389648726

Queen of Mahismati is an Indian historical fiction novel written by Anand Neelakantan. It acts as a prequel to the film Baahubali: The Beginning and sequel to the books The Rise of Sivagami and Chaturanga. It was originally released in English on 28 December 2020. Hindi, Telugu, and Tamil versions are yet to be released.

== Plot ==
Sivagami is arrested and brought to the court of Mahishmathi, where Mahadeva testifies against Sivagami. However, Prince Bjjaladeva had stated that whoever killed Rudra Bhatta will receive ten thousand gold coins. Bjjaladeva's men clarify this, Mahadeva states that a trial will have to be put instead of an immediate murder. Somadeva, the maharaja of Mahishmathi, releases Sivagami and even puts her in a better position in the court of Mahishmathi.

Durgappa, a bhoomipathi (transl. executioner) who is in charge of the Gauriparvat mountain is persuaded by Khanipathi Hidumba (who is in charge of the Gaurikanta mines) to declare independence from Mahishmathi and how their newly established Kingdom could become extremely rich with Gaurikanta stones. Sivagami's new ambition is to stop the mining happening in the Gauriparvat mountain.

With Durgappa establishing the kingdom of Gauriparvat as him as Maharaja and Hidumba as Mahapradhana, Somadeva's continuously becomes more stressed. Pattraya wants to kill the governor of Kadarimandalam, Shankaradeva. He publicly insults the vassal ruler of Kadaraimandalam, Narasimha Varman, who is also the brother of imprisoned Princess Chitraveni. There he hits Narasimha's throne with contained Gaurikanta stones. The stones were then fought by the ministers and soldiers. Pattaraya had a small packet under his tongue with contained snake poison. He was sent to Shankaradeva's office where Shankaradeva recognized him. Pattaraya bit the small packet which exposed poison and bit Shankaradeva who fell dead.

With Shankaradeva dead, Pattaraya declares himself the new governor. He declares Kadarimandalam independent with Chitraveni as Queen. Somadeva sends Mahadeva to make sure the Kali statue is deported safely to Mahishmathi, and Bjjaladeva is given a three thousand strong army to recapture Kadaraimandalam. Mahadeva is supposedly killed by Jeemotha, but Mahadeva actually escapes with Kattapa. Bjjaladeva asks Sivagami for her hand in marriage, Sivagami, wanting a higher position in power to persuade her goal of stopping the mining in Gauriparvat, accepts. They get married and Sivagami suggests if she could have a small army so she could attack Gauriparvat. Bjjaladeva agrees and split the army with her. Bjjaladeva heads to Kadarimandlam, meanwhile, Sivagami heads to Gauriparvat. Sivagami fights in Gauriparvat, she and her army are severely outnumbered as the Vaithlikas under Shivappa help Durgappa and Hidimba. They unleash Garuda Pakshis, fierce birds that attack.

Gundu Ramu escapes with the help of Vamana, he gets attacked by Garuda Pakshis and loses several fingers. Sivagami eventually wins the battle. Kattappa chases after Shivappa and they fight ferociously until Kattappa swirls his ribbon sword around Shivappa's neck and pulls it which decapitates Shivappa. The body of Shivappa falls down the volcano of Gauriparvat. Kattappa laments the death of his beloved brother. Bjjaldeva acts as he gets captured by Kadarimandlam, Somadeva heads with an army to save his son. Somadeva gets into a trap and is imprisoned. Sivagami regrets marrying Bjjaldeva and is still in love with Mahadeva. They all get captured by Bjjaldeva, Mahishmathi is made a vassal by Kadaraimandlam. Bjjaladeva marries Mekhala, Pattaraya's daughter. Mahapradhana Parameswara and Senapati Hiranya are killed and their heads are displayed at the front gates of the palace. Mekhala is made the queen of Mahishmathi. Mahadeva is imprisoned and also gets his eyes stitched, permanently closing his eyes. Sivagami is spared only because she was Bjjaldeva's second wife.

=== Five years later ===
Gundu Ramu serves the imprisoned Somadeva, Akhila forgives Sivagami releasing the true reason why Sivagami killed Akhila's father Thimma. Under Somadeva's advice, she is asked to do sex with Bjjaladeva to produce a child and cause tension in the family. Sivagami gives birth to a child. Somadeva is murdered by Uthanga, who had been a spy of Pattaraya for the past 5 years. Sivagami and Raghava attempt to coup Mahishmathi but results in Raghava hanging. Mekhala is driven out of Mahishmathi and Mahadeva's eyesight is restored. Bjjaldeva gets stuck in the undergrounds of Mahishmathi. The underground mine is flooded by Kattapa who was instructed by Somadeva before he died. Mahadeva becomes Maharaja, with the titular name Vikramadeva. Kalakeyas attempt to attack Mahishmathi but fail to do so, they are let free by Mahadeva. Mahadeva gives Ally a few villages to her. Achi Nagamma with the last Garuda Pakshi sacrifices her life to the volcano and it erupts. Mahadeva saves his brother but dies due to the volcano. Akhila is poisoned but she still gave birth to her child, Chitraveni was killed and Mekhala and Pattaraya are hanged. Soon, both Vikramadeva and Bijjaladeva's sons are born, and are named Amarendra Bahubali and Bhallaladeva. Sivagami takes over as the acting ruler of Mahishmati and raises both the children, until one of them is crowned as the king after growing up (as depicted in Baahubali: The Beginning).

== See also ==
- Baahubali: Before the Beginning
- The Rise of Sivagami
- Chaturanga
- Baahubali (franchise)
