= Anand Neelakantan =

Indian author

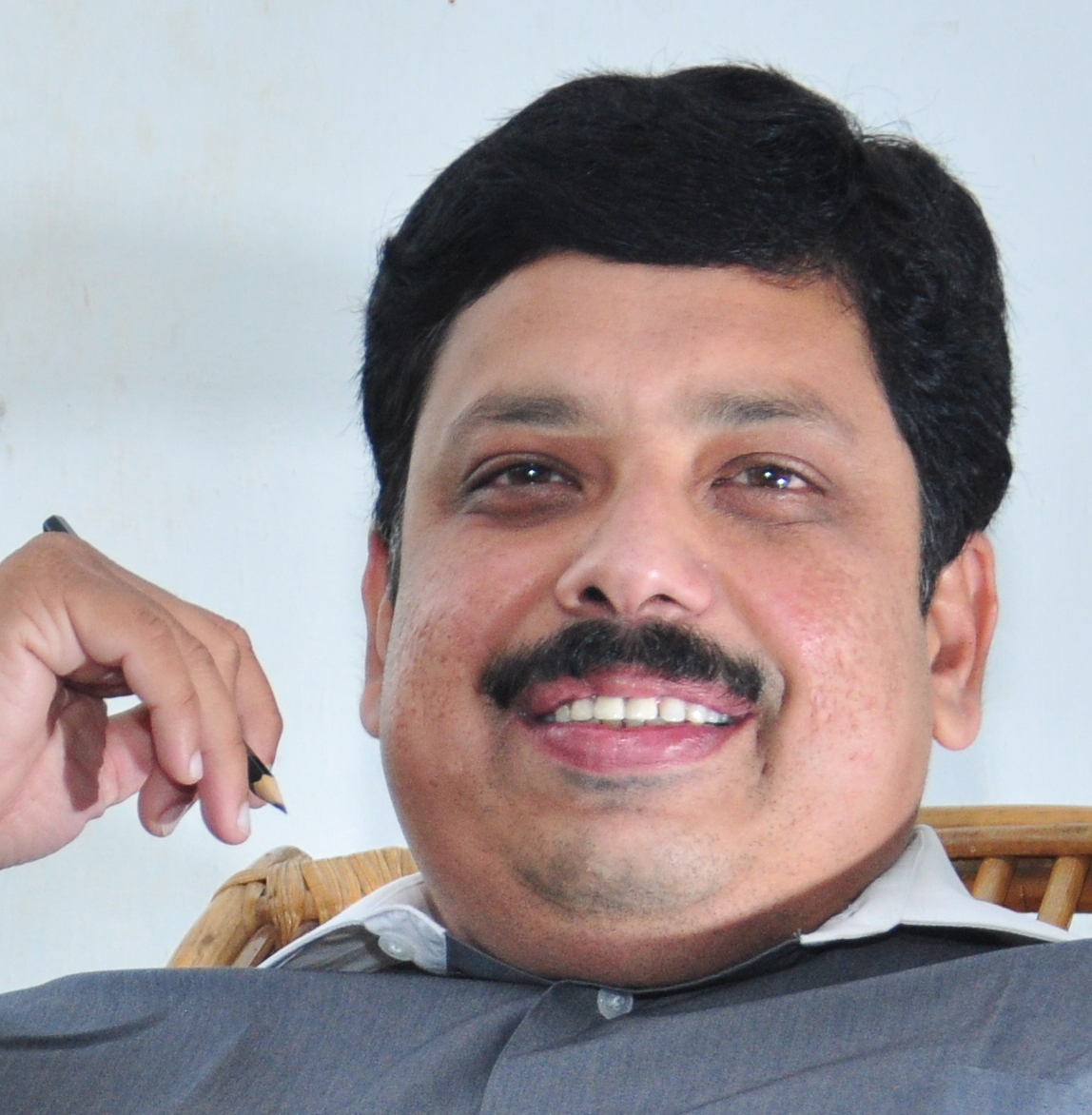
- Anand Neelakantan
- Born: Thrippunithura, Kerala, India
- Education: Government Engineering College, Thrissur
- Occupations: Novelist; screenwriter; public speaker; columnist
- Spouse: Aparna Anand
- Children: 2- Abhinav Anand, Ananya Anand
- Writing career
- Years active: 2012 – present
- Genre: Mythological fiction
- Notable works: Asura: Tale of the Vanquished; Ajaya: Roll of the Dice; Ajaya: Rise of Kali; The Rise of Sivagami
- Website: anandneelakantan.com

Anand Neelakantan is an Indian novelist, columnist, screenwriter, and public speaker. One of India's best selling authors, he is known for writing mythological fiction and has authored 16 books in English and one in Malayalam. He has been writing a column in The New Indian Express since 2017.

He follows the style of telling stories based on the perspective of the antagonists or supporting characters. His debut work Asura: Tale of the Vanquished (2012) was based on the Indian epic Ramayana, told from the perspective of Ravana—the first book in his Ramayana series. It was followed by series of books based on characters from Mahabharata and Baahubali. His books have been translated to different languages such as Tamil, Hindi, Malayalam, Telugu, Kannada, Marathi, Bengali, Gujarati, Assamese, English, Sinhalese, Burmese, Japense and Indonesian. Anand has written screenplays for Hindi television serials, such as Siya Ke Ram on Star TV, Mahabali Hanuman on Sony TV, Chakravarthy Ashoka on Colors TV, Sarfarosh on Netflix, Swaraj on DD National, Srimad Ramayan on Sony TV, among others. He has written the story for the OTT series TAJ on Zee5. Anand has acted in three advertisement films and has also played the role of Ettappa Naicker in the TV show Swaraj on Doordarshan.

His Asura was featured in the list of "100 books by Indian authors to read in a lifetime" by Amazon Books editors. The book has sold more than a million copies over the years. Four of his books have been shortlisted for Crossword Book Award. He was listed as one among the "100 top celebrities in India" in 2015 and in 2017 by Forbes India. Anand also writes a column for The New Indian Express on current affairs and his fortnightly column is called Acute Angle and Travel column for Outlook Traveller known as compass.

== Early life ==
He was born in Thripoonithura, a town on the outskirts of Kochi in Kerala. Anand Neelakantan is an alumnus of Government Engineering College, Thrissur in Kerala. He worked for Indian Oil Corporation from 1999 to 2022, before leaving the corporation for a full-time career in writing. He draws cartoons for Malayalam magazines. He is married to Aparna Anand and they have two children, Ananya Anand and Abhinav Anand.

== Career ==
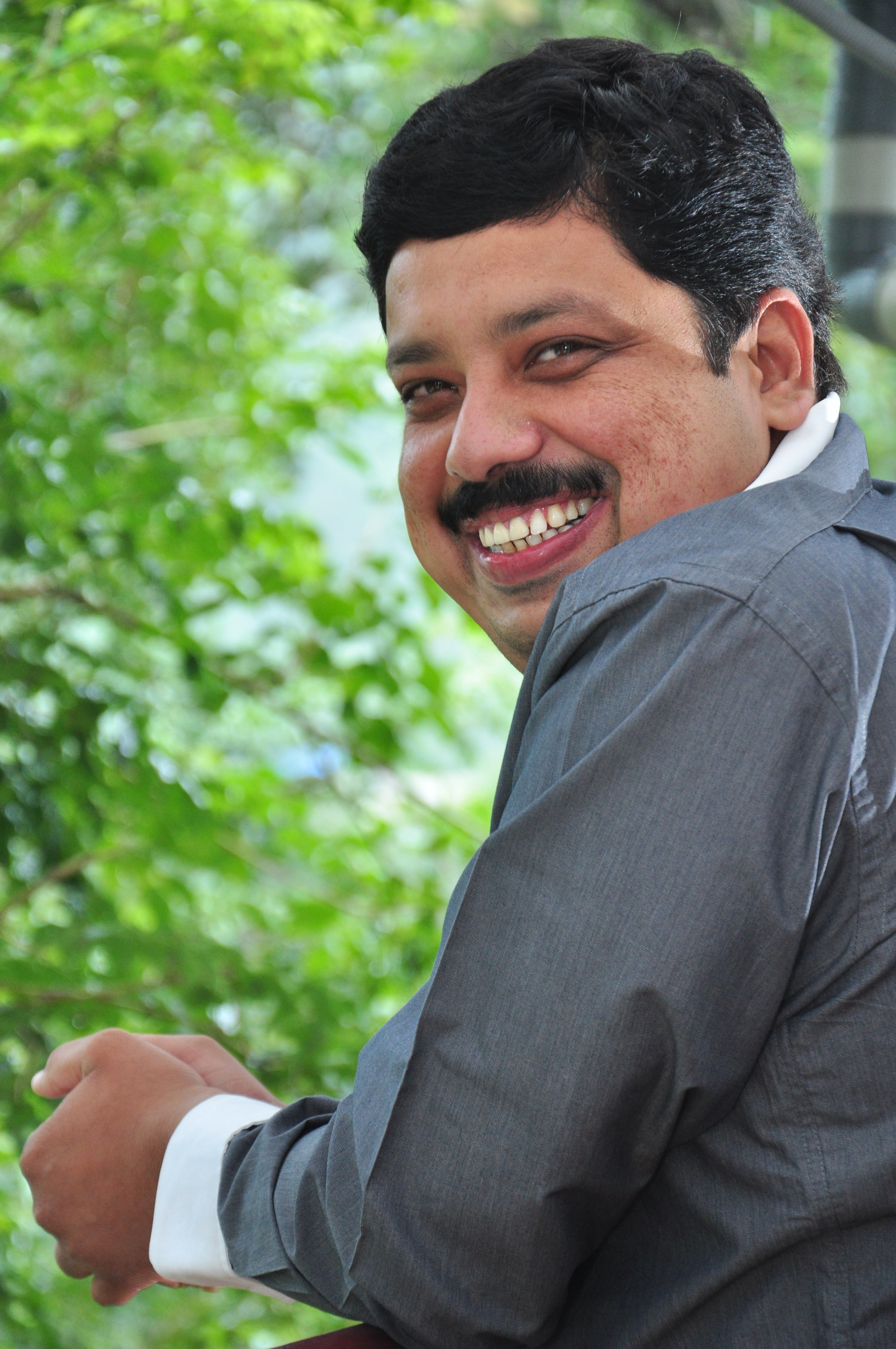
In Mumbai, 2018

His debut novel Asura: Tale of the Vanquished was published by Leadstart Publishing on 14 May 2012. The book became a surprise bestseller, breaking into the top seller charts within a week of its launch. His second book was based on Mahabharata told from the perspective of Kaurava and was part of a two-book series. Ajaya: Roll of the Dice was released in December 2013 and the sequel Ajaya: Rise of Kali was released in July 2015.

Anand Neelakantan wrote the official prequel series of novels for the Baahubali film series. Titled Bahubali: Before the Beginning, it is a three-book series that acts as a prequel to the films. The first book of the trilogy, The Rise of Sivagami, from the Bahubali: Before the Beginning trilogy, was released on 7 March 2017. S. S. Rajamouli, the director of Baahubali series, revealed the cover of the book at the Jaipur Literature Festival in 2017. The book became a blockbuster and was shortlisted for Crossword Popular Award 2018. Netflix has announced a webseries on the book. The second book in the series, Chaturanga was released on 6 August 2020. The third book, Queen of Mahishmathi, was released on 28 December 2020.

Anand's debut Children's book, The Very Extremely Most Naughty Asura tales for Kids was published on 28 September 2020 by Puffin books. Anand Neelakantan's fifth book Vanara, the legend of Baali, Sugreeva and Tara is published by Penguin Random House and is a best seller. Anand Neelakantan's children's book, Mahi-the elephant who flew over the blue mountains was shortlisted for 2024 Crossword popular children's book award. DAR films and KR movies have announced that they have won the film adoption rights and will be producing a multilingual film on Vanara. Anand's Malayalam work Pennramayanam has been published by Mathrubhumi Books. Harper collins has published Many Ramayanas Many Lessons, the Ramayana study of Anand Neelakantan in 2025 and the book has garnered good critical reviews.

Storytel published Anand's first Audio drama, Nala's Damayanti on 14 March 2022. The audio drama has appeared in 9 Indian languages. Nala Damayanti was published in 2023 as a Novel by Penguin Random House India Ltd. Anand's second children's book, The Tale of Naughty Flying Mountains and the third, The Tale of a Naughty Prank was published by Puffin, a Penguin children's imprint. Harper Collins Children India published Anand's first non-mythological Children's book, Mahi- the Elephant Who Flew Over the Blue Mountains, an allegorical and satirical work along the lines of Animal Farm in December 2023. Storytel published the audio drama, AMBA, based on the character of Shikandin of Mahabharata in five Indian languages in January 2023.

== List of works ==
=== Novels ===
Ramayana based

- Asura: Tale of the Vanquished (2012)
- Bhoomija: Sita (2017)
- Shanta: The Story of Rama's Sister (2017)
- Ravana's Sister: Meenakshi (2018)
- Vanara: The Legend of Baali, Sugreeva and Tara (2018)
- Pennramayanam (Malayalam) (2019)
- Valmiki's Women (2021)

Mahabharata based

- Ajaya: Roll of the Dice (2013)
- Ajaya: Rise of Kali (2015)
- Nala Damyanti: An Eternal Tale from the Mahabharata (2023)-Penguin books.

Bahubali series

- The Rise of Sivagami (2017)
- Chaturanga (2020)
- Queen of Mahishmathi (2020)

Children's books

- The Very Extremely Most Naughty Asura tales for Kids (Puffin Books) (2020)
- The Tale of the Naughty Flying Mountains (Puffin) (2023)
- Mahi-The Elephant Who Flew Over the Blue Mountains (Harper Collins) (2023)
- The Tale of the Naughty Prank (Puffin) (2024)

Non-fiction book

- The Asura way, The Contrarian Path to Success (Jaico Books) (2024)
- Many Ramayanas, Many Lessons (Harper Collins India) (2025)

Audio Books

- Many Ramayanas, Many Lessons (Audible.com) (2021)
- Nala's Damayanti (Storytel.com) (2021)
- Amba (Storytel.com) (2024)

=== Television ===
- Chakravartin Ashoka Samrat (Colors TV)
- Siya Ke Ram (Star Plus)
- Sankatmochan Mahabali Hanuman (Sony TV)
- Adaalat–2 (Sony TV)
- Sarfarosh - Battle of Saragarhi (Netflix)
- "Swaraaj" (DD National)
- "Taj: Divided by Blood" (Zee 5)
- "Shrimad Ramayan"-(Sony TV)- January 2024

== Accolades ==
- Best Historical Series- Indian Television Awards 2023- 'Swaraj' in DD National written by Anand Neelakantan
- Best original Story- Indian Television Awards 2023- Nominated- Taj, divided by Blood- Anand Neelakantan'
- Kalinga International Literary Award, 2017, Kalinga Literary Festival
- Anand Neelakantan was rated as one of the most promising writers by Indian Express, amongst the six most remarkable writers of 2012 by Daily News and Analysis and rated as the second most read writer of 2012 by Financial Express.
- His first book Asura: Tale of the Vanquished was shortlisted for Crossword popular award in 2013 and his second book, Ajaya: Roll of the dice was shortlisted for Crossword popular award in 2014. His book The Rise of Sivagami (Baahubali #1) was short listed for Crossword popular award in 2018
- His book The Rise of Sivagami (Baahubali #1) received accolades from top Indian book reviewers. Nala's Damayanti
- Anand Neelakantan was shortlisted for Crossword awards in four years, for his four different works in 2012, 2014, 2017 and 2024

== See also ==
- List of Indian writers
