= Tivala =

Prince of Magadha
- Born: 3rd century BC; Patliputra, Mauryan Empire (adjacent to present-day Patna, Bihar, India)
- Dynasty: Maurya
- Father: Ashoka
- Mother: Karuvaki
- Religion: Buddhism

Tivala (born 3rd-century BC), also referred to as Tivara, was the fourth son of Maurya Emperor Ashoka from his second queen, Karuvaki. He is the only son of Ashoka who is mentioned by name in his inscriptions, along with his mother, in the Queen Edict.

Tivala is the only son of Ashoka whose existence is attested by historical evidence and who was a possible successor to his father. Tivala is also considered to have been a favourite child of his aging father.
