= Asura: Tale of the Vanquished =

Book by Anand Neelakantan

- Author: Anand Neelakantan
- Language: English
- Genre: Mythological fiction
- Published: 14 May 2012
- Publisher: Leadstart Publishing Pvt Ltd
- Publication place: India
- Media type: Print (paperback)
- Pages: 504
- ISBN: 9789381576052
- OCLC: 811206898
- Followed by: Vanara: The Legend of Baali, Sugreeva and Tara

Asura: Tale of the Vanquished is the first novel of Anand Neelakantan. It was published by Leadstart publishing on 14 May 2012. This mythological fiction depicts the tale of Ramayana from the perspective of Ravana and a common Asura, Bhadra.

== Plot ==
The book attempts to highlight the voice of the vanquished as opposed to the victor’s version of Ramayana that is commonly known. It explores the struggles of Ravana and his life that made him what he was and attempts to create a link between the social construct as it may have existed and varied at the time and the well known instances described in legend of Ramayana as it is known today.

== Reception ==
Asura broke into the top seller charts within a week of its launch. It became the number one bestseller of 2012 as per Crossword list and CNN IBN. It was also nominated for Crossword’s Popular Award in 2013. The book has since been republished in many Indian languages.
