= Kalinga Literary Festival =

Literary festival held in Bhubanesawr, Odisha

Kalinga Literature Festival
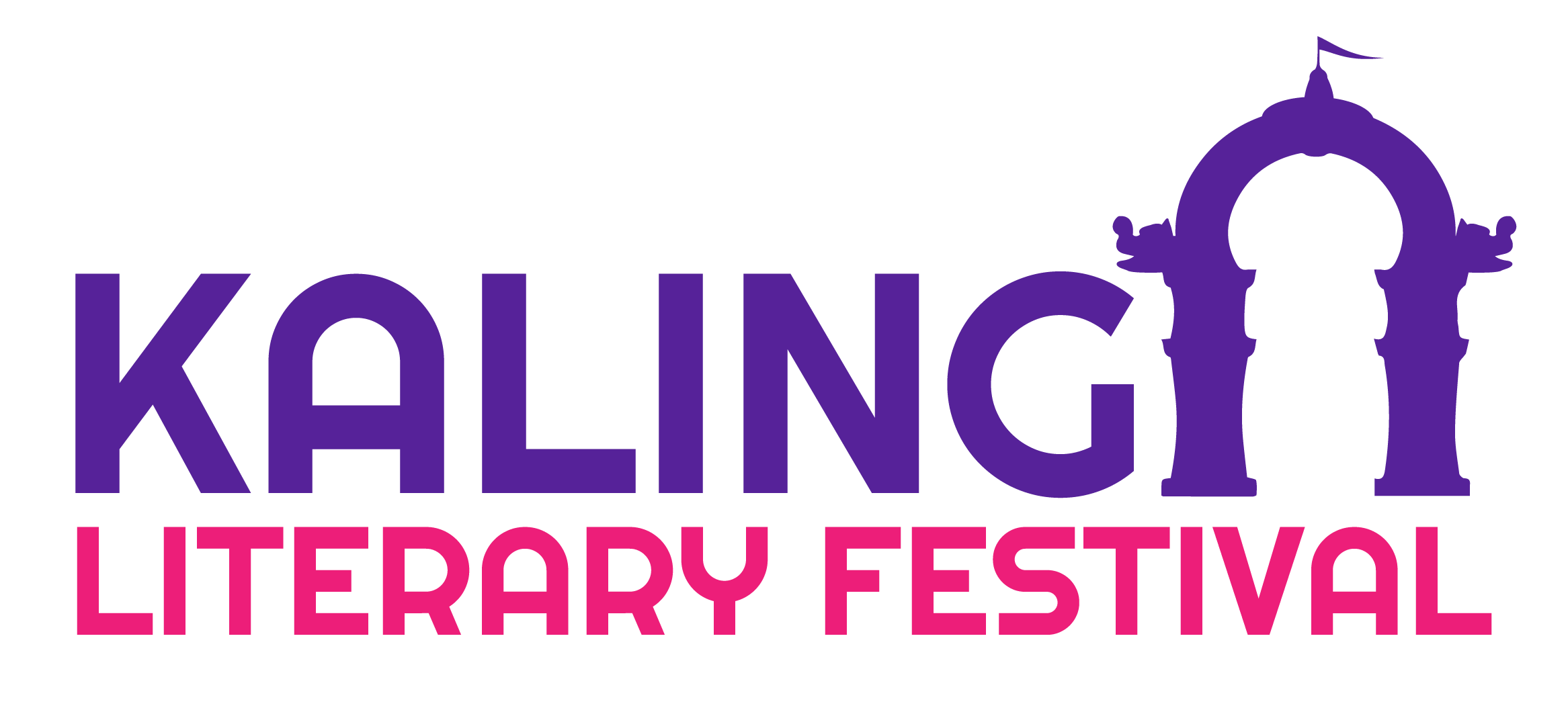
- Genre: Literary festival
- Locations: Bhubaneswar, Odisha, India
- Years active: 2013–present
- Website: http://Kalingaliteraryfestival.com

The Kalinga Literary Festival (Odia: କଳିଙ୍ଗ ସାହିତ୍ୟ ଉତ୍ସବ, romanized: Kaḷiṅga Sāhitya Utsaba, Hindi: कलिंग साहित्य उत्सव, romanized: Kaliṅga Sāhitya Utsav), also known as KLF, is an International literary festival which takes place annually in the Indian city Bhubaneswar, Odisha. Rashmi Ranjan Parida is the founder director of the festival. The festival confers KLF Book Awards and three literary awards, which are Kalinga Literary Award, Kalinga International Literary Award, Kalinga Karubaki Award, annually to the noted Indian writers.

== Timeline ==
The festival was started in 2014 with the aim of promoting Odia language, literature, and culture. The festival has been founded by journalist-writer Rashmi Ranjan Parida. Other team members include Prachee Naik and Sitansu Mahapatra.

Second Kalinga Literary Festival was held in 2015 with the theme of 'Literature as Reflection'. The key sessions focused on topics including Romanticism and contemporary literature, Feminism in contemporary Literature, Parallel Cinema and contemporary Literature, Dalit & Tribal Literature, Media, Medium, Message & Literature, Bhasa Sahitya Vs English Literature and the inter-related issues.

The third KLF edition was held for two days on 18 and 19 June 2016. It featured over 100 speakers. Some of the notable speakers were Piyush Mishra, Arif Mohammad Khan, Rahul Pandita, Haraprasad Das, Subrat Kumar Prusty. The festival had a session on youth, language and emotions in features speakers including Satyanand Nirupam, Vineet Kumar, Kedar Mishra, Sangam Lahiri, Arundhathi Subramaniam and Sujit Mohapatra

Fourth edition was launched on 10 June 2017, inaugurated by Sitakant Mahapatra and Ramakanta Rath. The main theme of the edition was "Literature for Peace and Harmony". It focused on whether literature has a role in promoting peace and harmony. The three days event (10 to 12 June) featured over 200 speakers including Bhalchandra Nemade, H. S. Shivaprakash, Kedarnath Singh, Haraprasad Das, Anand Neelakantan, Maitreyi Pushpa and Pratibha Ray. Two literary awards were introduced in this edition: Kalinga Literary Award and Kalinga International Literary Award .

The fifth edition was launched in 2018, and held between 8 and 10 June, featuring over 300 speakers including Amish Tripathi, Ramendra Kumar, Pavan Varma, Jayanta Mahapatra, Ramakanta Rath, Gourahari Das. Other events including Mystic Kalinga Multi-lingual Poetry Sessions were also held in this edition.

The sixth edition was held from 19 to 21 July 2019, featuring over 250 speakers. The main theme of this edition was "Gandhi's Idea of India: Truth, Non-Violence, Harmony" and it focused on Gandhian ideology. Some of the notable speakers were Namita Gokhale, Anand Neelakantan, Anu Choudhury, and Rashmi Bansal.

The 11th edition was held from 21 to 23 March 2025, featuring over 400 speakers. The main theme of this edition was "Gandhi's Idea of India: Truth, Non-Violence, Harmony" and it focused on Gandhian ideology. Some of the notable speakers were Dr Kambhampati Hari Babu, the Governor of Odisha, Gajendra Singh Shekhawat Minister Culture and Tourism, Government of India, Dr Shashi Tharoor, Ila Arun, Saikat Majumdar, Debdutt Pattnaik and others.

== Activities ==
During COVID-19 pandemic lockdown, KLF launched KLF Bhava Samvad webinar series which completed 300 sessions in September 2021. The festival confers three awards, Kalinga International Literary Award, Kalinga Literary Award, and Kalinga Karubaki Award, annually to the noted Indian writer.

== KLF Kathmandu ==
Kalinga Literary Festival started Kathmandu edition from 2022 with the aim of promoting Nepali language, literature, and culture ,
