= Cinematic style of S. S. Rajamouli =

Filmmaking style of S. S. Rajamouli

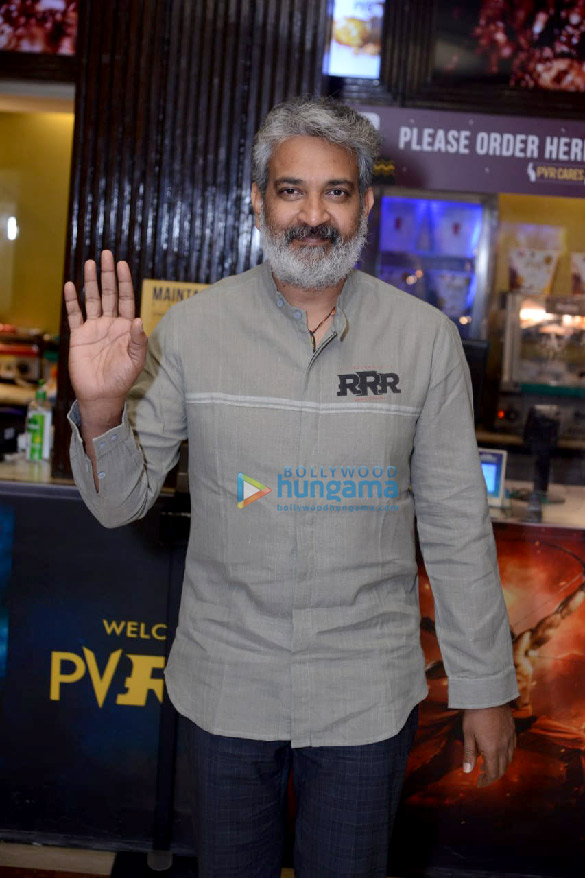
Rajamouli in 2022

S. S. Rajamouli is an Indian filmmaker who primarily works in Telugu cinema and is known for his action, fantasy, and epic genre films. Rachel Dwyer called Rajamouli "India's most significant director today". His films are typically characterised by their epic grandeur, unbridled heroism and larger-than-life characters. His films have themes and characters inspired from ancient Indian epics such as Ramayana and Mahabharata and are noted for their integration of the essential lessons and emotions in those ancient epics with visual grandeur. He frequently mentions that the mythological themes in his films are storytelling elements intended to create strong emotional impact on the viewers and are not a reflection of his personality or worldview. His films also have a liberal dose of violence, often orchestrated in stylised action set-pieces.

Rajamouli's films mostly follow the three-act structure where every major plot point ends on a high note with the film having a clap-worthy moment every 10 to 15 minutes. Several of his films also feature flashback episodes. His recent films focus heavily on visual storytelling. They are primarily made in Telugu and then dubbed into various other Indian and foreign languages. His works are typically visual effects-heavy, and he is one of the pioneering filmmakers in India in integrating computer-generated imagery (CGI) with live action. He prefers practical effects over CGI and likes to capture as much footage as possible in-camera. With his Baahubali films, he has pioneered the Pan-Indian film movement.

M. M. Keeravani, his cousin, has worked as the music composer for all of his films. Rajamouli has co-written several of his films with his father, Vijayendra Prasad. Rajamouli's wife, Rama worked as a costume designer or stylist for all of his films starting from Sye. Other frequent collaborators include editor Kotagiri Venkateswara Rao, cinematographer K. K. Senthil Kumar, production designers Sabu Cyril and S. Ravinder, action choreographers Peter Hein, Ram-Lakshman, and King Solomon. His films feature many recurring actors, notably Prabhas, Ram Charan, Jr. NTR, and Anushka Shetty, who appeared in lead roles in several films.

== Themes ==
When I start writing a story, for me, it is the emotion I should be moved by. I might be agnostic, but when I see a good film, like for example, Annamayya, a Telugu film which is about a devotee of Lord Venkateswara, and when I see the climax, I cry. It is a conversation between God and man, his disciple. I might not believe in God, but I connect to the emotion of a devotee and a God. And, I connect to the emotion that drives masses: devotion and submission to a greater self. I understand the power of that emotion, the power of a mass emotion, and I too feel that emotion. I might not believe in God, but I believe in the emotion, and if it moves me, I write it.

— Rajamouli on emotions and themes in his films.

A penchant for "larger-than-life" filmmaking, combined with a fascination for historical and mythological themes; abound with forts, battles, kings and their tales had Rajamouli helm films like Yamadonga, Magadheera and the Baahubali duology.

Rajamouli has cited ancient Indian narrative epics such as Ramayana and Mahabharata to be inspirational sources for his storytelling. He revisits the Amar Chitra Katha comics and keeps reading different versions of the Ramayana and Mahabharata from time to time. About the presence of mythological elements in his films, Rajamouli spoke thus:

"I am deeply influenced by mythology. Including it in my projects has always been a very sub-conscious decision because I grew up listening to the stories of mythology from my grandparents. It is completely embedded in my blood. Whatever goes in, comes out. I have so much input of mythology, it comes out in my stories in different forms. I feel very proud of it."

A scene in Simhadri had the protagonist impale a rapist on spikes overhead and bathe in his blood, who is then given a abhisheka by the priests for his deed. Baahubali series had elements resembling narratives from Mahabharata and Ramayana. The Devasena-Bhallaladeva scenes mirror the Sita-Ravana interactions in the Ramayana. The Baahubali-Bhallaladeva conflict parallels the Pandava-Kaurava conflict in the Mahabharata. Magadheera and Eega had the concept of reincarnation in its central plot.

Piyush Roy, a critic and film historian, attributed the success of Rajamouli to his ability to integrate the essential lessons and emotions in stories of Indian epics with visual grandeur. He noted that "aspects such as constant duel between good and evil, women as strong characters, presence of mother figures like Kunti and Gandhari are recurrent themes of his narratives."

Rajamouli frequently mentions that his films are not a reflection of his personality or worldview. He stated that the mythological and religious themes in his films are storytelling elements intended to create strong emotional impact on the viewers. He is also inclined to make films that transcend beyond language. Regarding that he says, "I learned that if I make my story based on basic human emotions, you can translate beyond the language. I have a chance to connect with more people."

Devarsi Ghosh of India Today observed that "the themes of an orphaned hero, a secret backstory, a separated family and a protagonist in search of his/her origins are prominent in Rajamouli's films." Themes centered around Jealous siblings, and adopted sons who strive to prove their loyalty featured prominently in Simhadri, Chatrapathi, and Baahubali. His films also have elements of tragedy which is not typical for commercial Telugu cinema—the death of Vikram Rathore during the central set-piece in Vikramarkudu, Kaala Bhairava jumping off the cliff in Magadheera, the self-immolation of the fly in the climax of Eega, the betrayal and death of Amarendra Baahubali in Baahubali films.

Rajamouli's films feature strong, principled heroes. Piyush Roy noted that the Veera rasa (heroism), amongst the navarasas, is the most prominent in the characters of Rajamoulis protagonists who make the film very engaging. The antagonists in his films are irredeemable with no moral compass. His protagonists have graduated from pure brawn in Simhadri, Chatrapathi, and Vikramarkudu to thinking, intelligent heroes who overthink their antagonists in Maryada Ramanna, Eega, and Baahubali. Rajamouli also experimented in Maryada Ramanna with a protagonist who is not hypermasculine or courageous–traits that are typical of his leads.

Revenge is a theme that regularly features in his films. When asked why this is so, in an interview with filmmaker Sandeep Vanga, Rajamouli said, "I believe revenge is the strongest emotion. I don't set out to make a revenge drama in particular. Revenge is an emotion that strongly and easily resonates with the audience. So, most of the time it's revenge." His films generally use a wide range of animals and Rajamouli attributes this to his love of animals.

Rajamouli's films also have a liberal dose of violence, often orchestrated in stylised action set-pieces. He cited the violence in Indian epics as an important factor that shaped up India, and as a filmmaker he doesn't think anyone in India would tone it down if not for the censorship. The violent scenes are often employed to induce awe in the viewer. His films also feature protagonists wielding ornate weapons.

== Method ==
Maintaining that his storytelling style has remained the same since he was in class two, Rajamouli prefers to set his films in an unrealistic and a fantasy world so that people can come out of their world into his. "I like people to be awe struck by my films," he said. His films mostly follow the three-act structure where every major plot point has a setup, confrontation, and resolution; resulting in a screenplay where every plot point ends on a high note with the film having a clap-worthy moment every 10 to 15 minutes.

Several of Rajamouli's films feature flashback episodes where the protagonist's backstory is revealed, typically in the second half of the film. This narrative style is used in Simhadri, Vikramarkudu, Magadheera, Baahubali: The Beginning, and RRR. The high point of Rajamouli's narrative style is considered to be the pre-interval scene—the scene immediately prior to the intermission. His pre-interval action scenes rev up the emotions of the audience creating a high point that increases the interest for the second half of the film. Examples include the Godavari Pushkaralu fight scene in Simhadri, the pre-interval fight scene in Vikramarkudu, and the 100 soldier fight scene in Magadheera.

I’m very loyal to my action sequences. I just won’t put them in for the sake of it. I believe that human endurance and physical capabilities are unimaginable when they are emotionally charged. There are things that real people have achieved that we can’t imagine, but they happen once in a lifetime … The only thing is they happen quite a number of times in my films.

— Rajamouli on action sequences in his films.

Describing his films as “big-scale action movies driven by hard-core emotion”, Rajamouli considers himself to be a magnifying glass that enhances the various emotions of the characters on screen, and sees the presence of violent action as an integral factor that engages the viewer with on screen proceedings. "For me, the character being emotionally charged up at that moment to go into that action sequence is very, very important," said Rajamouli about action sequences in his films.

Rajamouli's initial films have comedic sub-plots and songs that are not integral to the main plot of the film. He noted, “Initially, I used to add a lot of scenes for the sake of comedy, songs because I used to fear how people would react if they aren't there. Once I got a lot of confidence as a story-teller, I no longer see the necessity to do all that”.

Rajamouli regrets not working for a longer time as an assistant director. “When I made my first film Student No: 1, I didn't know how to use a crane because I never used a crane while I was doing my TV serial." He mentions basic shotmaking as his biggest shortcoming as a director. “I still don't know which shot exactly gives me what I need. I get so many doubts whether I should keep the camera standard, whether I should move the track-in slowly, how close should I really get — close to the eyes, close to the face, whether I should go a little bit to the top. There are thousands of options that run through my mind and I don't know which is the right thing to do. That is my shortcoming. I can't decide which is the right camera angle," he noted in an interaction in June 2022.

In the beginning of his career, Rajamouli used to act and show the actors how to perform or enact the character and was very adamant on the minutiae of their performances. "Slowly I realised that all my actors are looking the same. All my actors were imitating what I was doing. Then I thought, why do I go to a particular actor? (It is) because he has a specific ability. Then I started hammering the emotion into the actor and let them perform accordingly," he noted.

Beginning with the Baahubali films, Rajamouli started conducting workshops with the major cast members and writing everything about a character — the complete backstory of the character including traits and events that aren't present in the final film — prior to the commencement of principal photography.

Rajamouli's films typically, are visual effects-heavy and he is one of the pioneering filmmakers in India in integrating computer-generated imagery (CGI) with live action. He mentions his preference for practical effects over CGI and likes to capture as much footage as possible in-camera. Rajamouli's craft in CGI has improved with time. The CGI in the underwater shark-fighting sequence in Chatrapathi was considered ambitious, but choppy. The CGI sequences in Magadheera, Eega, Baahubali, and RRR are more polished with each film improving upon the previous one.

=== Visual storytelling ===
For me, whether it is subtitling or the (original) language, it's just a medium of communication. Those are not important for me. I would rather want my audience to get the story through the visuals, the way actors are performing or how the background score is. That is what I would prefer as a filmmaker.

— Rajamouli on visual storytelling.

Rajamouli's later films focus heavily on visual storytelling. He noted in an interview, "While creating a story, I think 'If I switch off this dialogue portion, will the audience still connect to my movie?' Many times, the answer is a yes.”

“I try to tell my story through visuals. I try to put in as little dialogue as possible, but the dialogues we do put in ... my writers take excruciating care, writing version after version so that nuance does not get lost in translation.”

=== Multi-lingual films ===
Rajamouli's films starting from Eega have been made in Telugu language and then dubbed into various Indian and foreign languages. He described the process of making a multi-lingual film in this way.

"My thinking is in Telugu, the script is in Telugu first. But even before I go to shoot, I send the script to other language writers so they also get into the clue of what the film is about. Those dialogues may not be the final ones I am going to use in the film, but they read the script and if there is anything that complements my story, I change the Telugu version. It's an elaborate process because they write, but have to check with the lip-sync. You can't have a 20 word sentence in place of a six word sentence. We get the lip-sync right, but we don't compromise on the quality."

== Influences ==
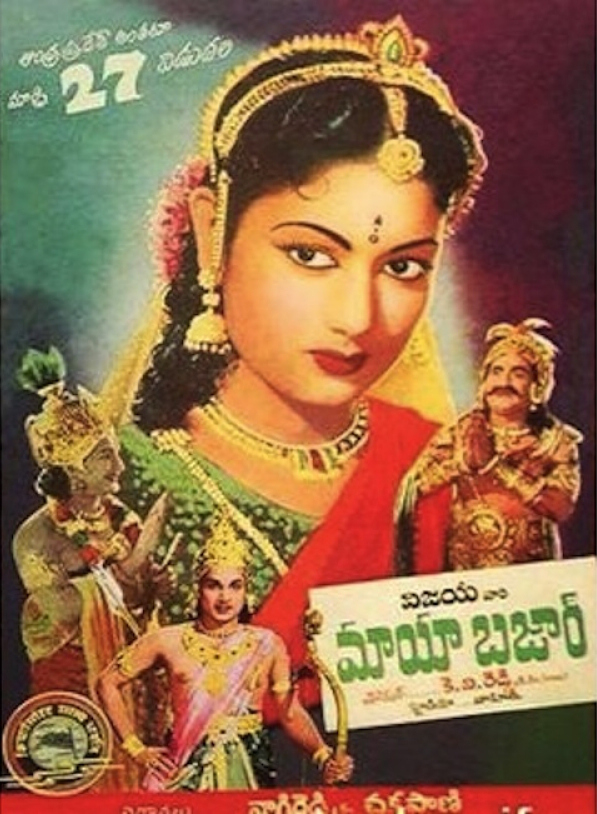
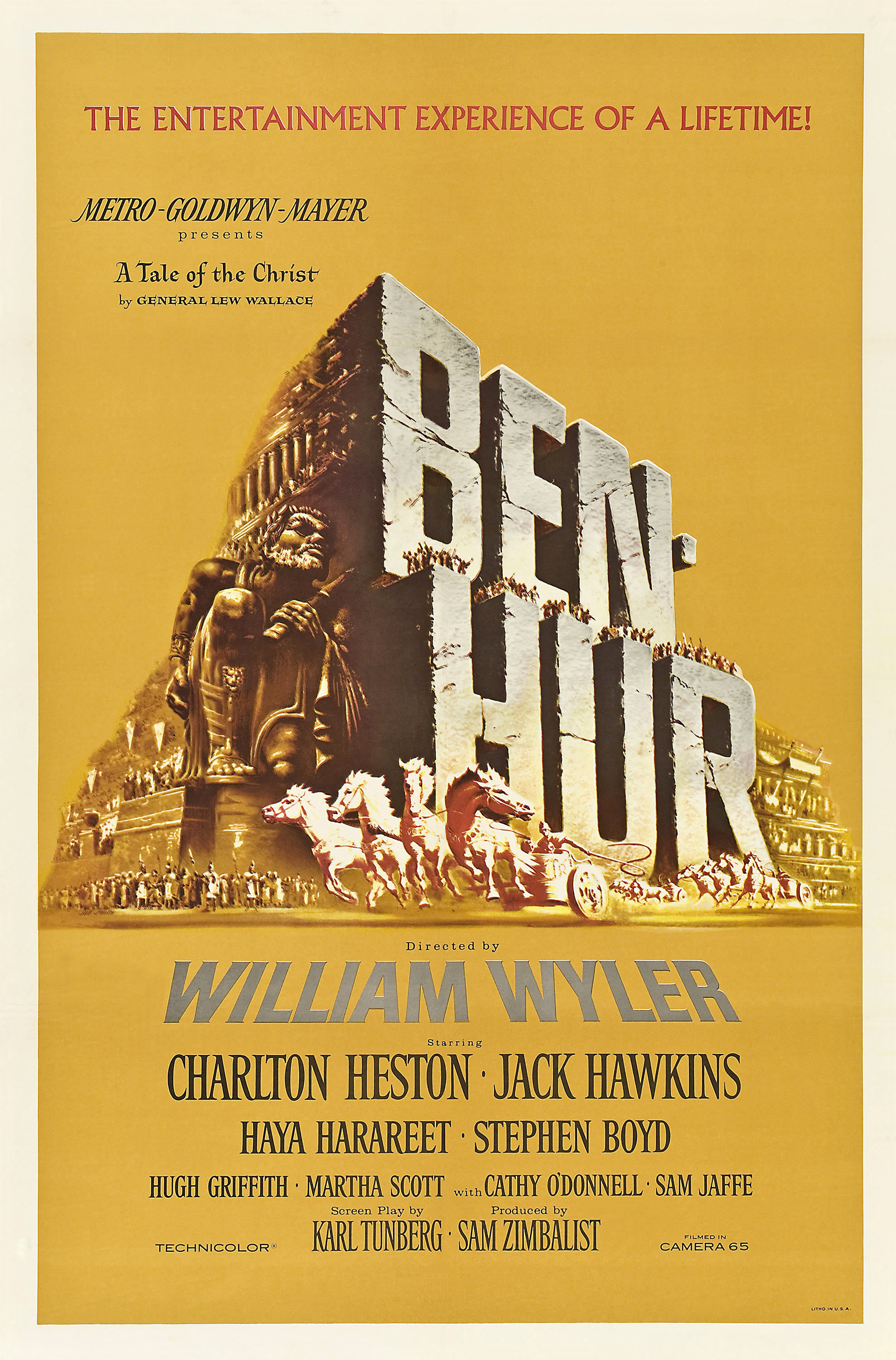
Mayabazar (left) and Ben-Hur (right), two of Rajamouli's most favourite and influential films.

Action and adventure films are Rajamouli's favourite genre. Rajamouli frequently mentions Mayabazar (1957), Ben-Hur (1959) and Braveheart (1995) as his most favourite and influential films. His other favourite films include Missamma (1955), The Last of the Mohicans (1992), The Good, the Bad and the Ugly (1966), Terminator 2 (1991), Indiana Jones and the Last Crusade (1989), City Lights (1931), Apocalypto (2006), Kung Fu Panda (2008), The Lion King (1994), Aladdin (1992), Sherlock Holmes (2009), Forrest Gump (1994), and Django Unchained (2012). He expressed his liking for the films of James Cameron, Steven Spielberg, Quentin Tarantino and John Woo. The chariot race scene in Ben-Hur was a strong influence on him since his childhood. His 2009 directorial Magadheera featured scenes with horses and chariots that Rajamouli acknowledged as an inspiration from Ben-Hur .

Rajamouli has cited Mel Gibson as his favourite filmmaker and the biggest influence on his filmmaking style. He mentioned that he considers Gibson to be his guru, and also compared himself with Ekalavya to Gibson's Drona. Regularly paying homage to Gibson in his films, he noted in an interview:

"Many of Mel Gibson's films have a very, very big influence on me. The way he blends the action with the drama, how he slows down, how he switches the dramatic moment before the action explodes, I really, really love it. I get really inspired by his action a lot. That's one thing that really comes to my mind when I talk about action films. It's what inspired me to do action films."

He is also deeply fascinated by the films of Vijaya Productions like Pathala Bhairavi (1951), Mayabazar (1957), and Jagadeka Veeruni Katha (1961). He noted, "Those films stirred the creative juices in my childhood itself. The artistes, their body language, dialogue delivery are all etched into my memory permanently."

Rajamouli attributes his sense of drama to his father Vijayendra Prasad under whom he worked as an assistant early in his career. He is deeply influenced by the novels of Malladi Venkata Krishna Murthy and Yandamuri Veerendranath. He also expressed his fondness for the works of Wilbur Smith. He generally dislikes horror films, especially ones that involve jump scares. He is more receptive to films that scare the viewer with their theme or story. He mentioned his favourite films in the horror genre as The Omen (1976) and Paranormal Activity (2007).

Among Indian directors, Rajamouli cites K. V. Reddy as his biggest influence; Ram Gopal Varma and Raj Kapoor being others. Among his contemporaries in Telugu cinema, he expressed his admiration for the works of Sukumar and Trivikram Srinivas. He also praised the work and cinematic style of Rajkumar Hirani and Anurag Kashyap.

For Baahubali, Rajamouli was inspired by the tales of Amar Chitra Katha and Chandamama along with the Sanskrit epics Mahabharata and Ramayana. For RRR, he mentioned The Motorcycle Diaries (2004) and Inglourious Basterds (2009) as his inspirations.

== Collaborators ==
=== Crew ===
Rajamouli frequently collaborates with a set of crew members and technicians. Kotagiri Venkateswara Rao, under whom he started his film career as an assistant, has edited all of his films except for RRR, which was edited by A. Sreekar Prasad. K. K. Senthil Kumar served as the cinematographer on eight of his films. Among art directors or production designers, he worked with Anand Sai for Simhadri, Sye, and Yamadonga; S. Ravinder worked with him in five of his films till Eega; the acclaimed Sabu Cyril worked with him on the Baahubali duology and RRR. M. Ratnam worked as a dialogue writer for all six of Rajamouli's films starting from Simhadri till Magadheera. Among action choreographers, he collaborated with Peter Hein in five films — Student No.1, Chatrapathi, Magadheera, Maryada Ramanna, and Baahubali: The Beginning; Ram-Lakshman worked with him in three films — Sye, Vikramarkudu, and Magadheera; King Solomon worked as the action choreographer for Baahubali and RRR; Lee Whittaker worked as an action director / stunt coordinator for both the Baahubali films.

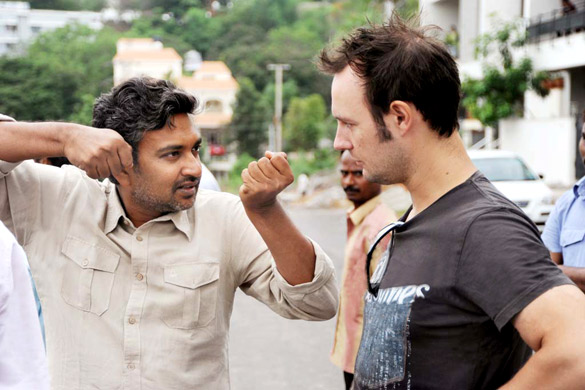
Rajamouli and Pete Draper of Makuta VFX on the sets of Eega

R. C. Kamalakannan served as the visual effects supervisor for five of his films — Yamadonga, Magadheera, Maryada Ramanna, Eega, and Baahubali 2: The Conclusion. V. Srinivas Mohan worked as the visual effects supervisor for Baahubali: The Beginning, and RRR. Iranian citizen Adel Adili, who previously worked on Yamadonga, Englishman Pete Draper, and R. C. Kamalakannan founded Makuta VFX based out of Hyderabad. Makuta has extensively collaborated with Rajamouli in all his films from Magadheera till RRR.

K. Raghavendra Rao produced his debut film Student No: 1 and presented the Baahubali films. Cherry (Chiranjeevi Pedamallu) was the executive producer for Chatrapathi, Vikramarkudu and later produced Yamadonga. B. V. S. N. Prasad produced Chatrapathi and was the executive producer for Magadheera. Shobu Yarlagadda and Prasad Devineni produced Maryada Ramanna and the Baahubali duology. Sai Korrapati and Prasad V. Potluri produced his Eega; D. V. V. Danayya produced his magnum opus, RRR.

Rajamouli regularly collaborates with many members of his extended family. His cousin M. M. Keeravani has worked as the music composer for all of his films. His father Vijayendra Prasad provided the story for nine of his films. His wife, Rama Rajamouli, worked as a costume designer or stylist for all of his films starting from Sye. His sister-in-law M. M. Srivalli, wife of Keeravani, served as a Line Producer on four of his films. His cousin S. S. Kanchi collaborated with him on four films in the writing department including as a story writer for Maryada Ramanna.

His uncle Siva Shakthi Datta, brother of Vijayendra Prasad and father of Keeravani, worked as a lyricist in five of his films. Another uncle of his, Koduri Ramakrishna, was the co-lyricist for Saahore Baahubali along with Datta. Rajamouli's cousin Kalyani Malik works as a sound supervisor for his films. Raja Koduri, another cousin of his, contributed to Baahubali series in technical departments through AMD Radeon. Rajabali, another cousin of his, worked as a VFX Assistant for Baahubali. His nephew Kaala Bhairava, elder son of Keeravani, worked as a playback singer in Baahubali series and RRR. Sri Simha, younger son of Keeravani, worked as a child actor in Yamadonga and Maryada Ramanna, along with minor roles in Eega and Baahubali: The Beginning. In addition, Rajamouli's step-son S. S. Karthikeya also works in the production or direction department of his films. His adopted daughter Mayookha along with Keeravani's daughter acted in the song Saahore Baahubali of Baahubali 2. Kalyani Malik's son Mayur lent his voice in some parts at the end of Baahubali 2. As many as fifteen members of his extended family had worked on Baahubali 2.

Collaborations of Rajamouli – Crew
Work Collaborator
| Work Collaborator | Student No:1 (2001) | Simhadri (2003) | Sye (2004) | Chatrapathi (2005) | Vikramarkudu (2006) | Yamadonga (2007) | Magadheera (2009) | Maryada Ramanna (2010) | Eega (2012) | Baahubali (2015, 2017) | RRR (2022) | Total |
|---|---|---|---|---|---|---|---|---|---|---|---|---|
| M. M. Keeravani | Yes | Yes | Yes | Yes | Yes | Yes | Yes | Yes | Yes | Yes | Yes | 11 |
| V. Vijayendra Prasad | | Yes | Yes | Yes | Yes | Yes | Yes | | | Yes | Yes | 8 |
| K. K. Senthil Kumar | | | Yes | Yes | | Yes | Yes | | Yes | Yes | Yes | 7 |
| Kotagiri Venkateswara Rao | Yes | Yes | Yes | Yes | Yes | Yes | Yes | Yes | Yes | Yes | | 10 |
| Rama Rajamouli | | | Yes | Yes | Yes | Yes | Yes | Yes | Yes | Yes | Yes | 9 |
| M. Ratnam | | Yes | Yes | Yes | Yes | Yes | Yes | | | | | 6 |
| Peter Hein | Yes | | | Yes | | | Yes | Yes | | Yes | | 5 |
| Ram-Lakshman | | | Yes | | Yes | | Yes | | | | | 3 |
| Vijayan | | Yes | Yes | | | | | | | | | 2 |
| King Solomon | | | | | | | | | Yes | Yes | Yes | 3 |
| Anand Sai | | Yes | Yes | | | Yes | | | | | | 3 |
| S. Ravinder | | | | Yes | Yes | | Yes | Yes | Yes | | | 5 |
| Sabu Syril | | | | | | | | | | Yes | Yes | 2 |
| R. C. Kamalakannan | | | | | | Yes | Yes | Yes | Yes | Yes | | 5 |
| V. Srinivas Mohan | | | | | | | | | | Yes | Yes | 2 |
| S. S. Kanchi | | | | | | | Yes | Yes | Yes | | Yes | 4 |
| M. M. Srivalli | | | | | | Yes | | | Yes | Yes | Yes | 4 |
| Shobu Yarlagadda and Prasad Devineni | | | | | | | | Yes | | Yes | | 2 |
| K. Raghavendra Rao | Yes | | | | | | | | | Yes | | 2 |
| Cherry | | | | Yes | Yes | Yes | | | | | | 3 |
| B. V. S. N. Prasad | | | | Yes | | | Yes | | | | | 2 |

=== Cast ===
Rajamouli has worked with some actors frequently in his career. Jr. NTR starred in four of his films including Rajamouli's debut film Student No.1. Prabhas has starred in three of his films — Chatrapathi and Baahubali series. Ram Charan collaborated with him on Magadheera and RRR. Ravi Teja starred in Vikramarkudu and provided the voice for bicycle in Maryada Ramanna. Sunil starred in Maryada Ramanna and played a supporting role in Magadheeera. Sudeep played the antagonist in Eega and had a cameo in Baahubali: The Beginning.

Anushka Shetty played the female lead in Vikramarkudu and the Baahubali series. Shriya Saran played the female lead in Chatrapathi and was also cast in RRR in a supporting role. Ramya Krishna appeared in an item song in Simhadri and later played one of the central character, Sivagami Devi, in Baahubali films. Saloni had a cameo in Magadheera and later played the female lead in Maryada Ramanna. Mumaith Khan appeared in item songs in Chatrapathi and Magadheera.

Kota Srinivasa Rao worked with him in three films. Nassar acted in Simhadri, Sye, and the Baahubali series. Pradeep Rawat was introduced to Telugu film industry by Rajamouli as the antagonist Bikshu Yadav in Sye which won him fame. He later worked in Chatrapathi as the villain Ras Bihari. Narendra Jha was cast as the antagonist Baji Rao in Chatrapathi and later also acted in Yamadonga. Supreeth worked in three films of Rajamouli as a goon or henchman of the main antagonist. Rajamouli gave Prabhakar his first full-fledged role in Maryada Ramanna which became his breakthrough role. Prabhakar named his son after Rajamouli as gratitude towards him. He later played the Kalakeya leader Inkoshi in Baahubali: The Beginning. After the film's success, he came to be popularly referred to as 'Kalakeya Prabhakar'.

Rajamouli also regularly collaborates with Rajeev Kanakala and Chatrapathi Sekhar who appeared in six and nine of his films respectively. Rajamouli also worked with the comic actors Brahmanandam, M. S. Narayana, Venu Madhav, Ali, L. B. Sriram, Raghu Babu, Srinivasa Reddy, Sivannarayana Naripeddi, and Hema in multiple films. Tanikella Bharani acted in Student No.1, Sye, and Baahubali. Sameer, Ajay, Jaya Prakash Reddy, Rao Ramesh, Subbaraya Sarma, Surya, and Preeti Nigam acted in supporting roles in many of his films. His cousin S. S. Kanchi acted in his films apart from working in the writing department. His nephew Sri Simha, younger son of Keeravani, worked as a child actor in Yamadonga and Maryada Ramanna, along with minor roles in Eega and Baahubali: The Beginning.

Collaborations of Rajamouli – Cast
Work Collaborator
| Work Collaborator | Student No: 1 (2001) | Simhadri (2003) | Sye (2004) | Chatrapathi (2005) | Vikramarkudu (2006) | Yamadonga (2007) | Magadheera (2009) | Maryada Ramanna (2010) | Eega (2012) | Baahubali (2015, 2017) | RRR (2022) | Total |
|---|---|---|---|---|---|---|---|---|---|---|---|---|
| Jr. NTR | Yes | Yes | | | | Yes | | | | | Yes | 4 |
| Prabhas | | | | Yes | | | | | | Yes | | 2 |
| Ram Charan | | | | | | | Yes | | | | Yes | 2 |
| Sunil | | | | | | | Yes | Yes | | | | 2 |
| Ravi Teja | | | | | Yes | | | Voice role | | | | 2 |
| Sudeep | | | | | | | | | Yes | Yes | | 2 |
| Anushka Shetty | | | | | Yes | | | | | Yes | | 2 |
| Shriya Saran | | | | Yes | | | | | | | Yes | 2 |
| Ramya Krishna | | Yes | | | | | | | | Yes | | 2 |
| Saloni | | | | | | | Yes | Yes | | | | 2 |
| Mumaith Khan | | | | Yes | | | Yes | | | | | 2 |
| Nassar | | Yes | Yes | | | | | | | Yes | | 3 |
| Kota Srinivasa Rao | Yes | Yes | | Yes | | | | | | | | 3 |
| Pradeep Rawat | | | Yes | Yes | | | | | | | | 2 |
| Ajay | Yes | Yes | Yes | Yes | Yes | | | | | | | 5 |
| Jaya Prakash Reddy | | | | Yes | Yes | Yes | | | | | | 3 |
| Supreeth | | | Yes | Yes | | | | Yes | | | | 3 |
| Prabhakar | | | | | | | | Yes | | Yes | | 2 |
| Narendra Jha | | | | Yes | | Yes | | | | | | 2 |
| Rajeev Kanakala | Yes | | Yes | | Yes | Yes | | | Yes | | Yes | 6 |
| Chatrapathi Sekhar | Yes | Yes | Yes | Yes | Yes | | Yes | Yes | Yes | | Yes | 9 |
| Sameer | Yes | Yes | Yes | | | | Yes | | | | | 4 |
| Tanikella Bharani | Yes | | Yes | | | | | | | Yes | | 3 |
| Rao Ramesh | | | | | | | Yes | Yes | | | | 2 |
| Subbaraya Sharma | Yes | Yes | | Yes | | Yes | Yes | Yes | | Yes | | 7 |
| Surya | | | | Yes | | | Yes | | | | | 2 |
| Prabhas Sreenu | | | | | Yes | Yes | | | | | | 2 |
| Preeti Nigam | Yes | | Yes | | | | | | | | | 2 |
| Brahmanandam | Yes | Yes | | | Yes | Yes | Yes | | | | | 5 |
| M. S. Narayana | Yes | | | | | Yes | | | | | | 2 |
| Venu Madhav | | Yes | Yes | Yes | | | | | | | | 3 |
| Ali | Yes | | | | | Yes | | | | | | 2 |
| Srinivasa Reddy | | Yes | | Yes | | Yes | | | Yes | | | 4 |
| Sivannarayana Naripeddi | Yes | Yes | Yes | | Yes | Yes | | | Yes | | | 6 |
| L. B. Sriram | Yes | | | Yes | | | | | | | | 2 |
| Raghubabu | | | | | Yes | Yes | | | | | | 2 |
| S. S. Kanchi | | Yes | Yes | Yes | | | | Yes | | | | 4 |
| Hema | | Yes | | | | | Yes | | | | | 2 |

== Views on the film industry ==
=== Theatres and streaming services ===
Rajamouli is of the view that watching films in a movie theatre is the best way to experience them as theatres provide the unique communal experience in seeing how other people feel the emotions of the characters on screen. He said there's a kind of synergy that one experiences in a theater which doesn't come in a home or on a personal device, the experience can't be replicated. Being optimistic that theaters would thrive and prosper in the age of Streaming media, he said "[a] movie theater is like a temple. The other day, I went to the Music Box Theatre in Chicago, and I almost had tears. It was such a great feeling." In an interview with American media, he suggested various measures to make people prefer theatres over streaming services, like reintroduction of intermission – as it provides an opportunity for the audience to refresh themselves. He also opined that movie stars play a big role in bringing audiences to theaters.

=== Pan-Indian film ===
Rajamouli is credited with pioneering the pan-Indian films movement with his duology of epic action films Baahubali: The Beginning (2015) and Baahubali 2: The Conclusion (2017), that changed the face of Indian cinema. He emphasised that making a pan-Indian film doesn't necessarily mean getting actors from different Indian film industries, but instead its about having a story and emotion that connects to everyone irrespective of the language. He stated that while creating a story, he often thinks whether the audience would be able to connect to his movie if the dialogue is turned off and many a times he feels in the affirmative.

== See also ==
- List of awards and nominations received by S. S. Rajamouli
- List of film director and actor collaborations
- List of highest-grossing Indian films
- List of highest-grossing Telugu films
