= S. S. Rajamouli filmography =

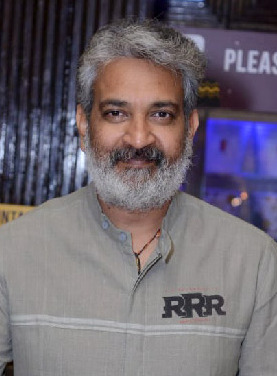
Rajamouli at the promotions of 2022 film RRR

S. S. Rajamouli is an Indian film director and screenwriter who works in Telugu cinema. He is best known for his work in action, fantasy, and epic films. He has directed thirteen feature films so far. His films are typically characterised by their epic grandeur, unbridled heroism and larger-than-life characters. His films have themes and characters inspired from ancient Indian epics and are noted for their integration of the emotions in those ancient epics with visual grandeur.

== Film ==
Key
†	Denotes films that have not yet been released

All the films given are of Telugu language unless mentioned.

List of S. S. Rajamouli film credits
Year	Title	Credited as		Notes
Year	Title	Director	Screenwriter	Notes
2001	Student No: 1	Yes	No	
2003	Simhadri	Yes	Yes	Debut as screenwriter
2004	Sye	Yes	Yes	
2005	Chatrapathi	Yes	Yes	
2006	Vikramarkudu	Yes	Yes	
2007	Yamadonga	Yes	Yes	
2009	Magadheera	Yes	Yes	
2010	Maryada Ramanna	Yes	Yes	
2012	Eega	Yes	Yes	Also story writer; Shot simultaneously in Tamil as Naan Ee
2015	Baahubali: The Beginning	Yes	Yes	Shot simultaneously in Tamil
2017	Baahubali 2: The Conclusion	Yes	Yes	
2022	RRR	Yes	Yes	
2025	Baahubali: The Epic	Yes	Yes	Combined re-release version of The Beginning and The Conclusion
2027	Varanasi †	Yes	Yes	Filming

== Other credits in films ==
=== Acting credits ===
List of S. S. Rajamouli film acting credits
Year	Title	Role	Notes	Ref(s)
2004	Sye	Nalla Balu's henchman	Uncredited cameo appearance	
2008	Rainbow	Himself	Cameo appearance	
2009	Magadheera	Himself	Uncredited cameo appearance in "Anaganaganaga" song	
2012	Eega	Person who throws cigarette on ground and in traffic as bike driver	Uncredited cameo appearance	
2015	Baahubali: The Beginning	Sprit seller	Uncredited cameo appearance before the song "Manohari"	
2016	Majnu	Himself	Cameo appearance	
2022	RRR	Himself	Uncredited cameo appearance in "Ettara Jenda" song	
2024	Kalki 2898 AD	Bounty hunter	Cameo appearance	
2024	RRR: Behind and Beyond	Himself	Documentary film	
2026	Bahubali The Torch Bearer	Himself	Documentary serial	

=== Other roles ===
List of S. S. Rajamouli other film role credits
Year	Title	Role	Notes	Ref(s)
2011	Rajanna	Action director		
2012	Eega	Narrator	Voice role	
2012	Andala Rakshasi	Co-producer		
2022	Radhe Shyam	Narrator for Telugu version	Voice role	

== Television ==
Key
†	Denotes films that have not yet been released

List of S. S. Rajamouli television credits
Year	Title	Credited as	Network	Language	Notes	Ref.
2000	Santhi Nivasam	Director, Story writer	ETV	Telugu		
2008	Yuva	Himself	MAA TV	Telugu	Cameo appearance	
2010	Come on India	Host	HMTV	Telugu		
2015	Bollywood and Beyond: A Century of Indian Cinema	Himself	BBC Four	English	TV documentary	
2017–2020	Baahubali: The Lost Legends	Executive producer	Netflix	Hindi; English	Creator	
2024	Baahubali: Crown of Blood	Executive producer	Disney+ Hotstar	Hindi	Creator	
2024	Modern Masters: S. S. Rajamouli	Himself	Netflix	English	Documentary film	
2025	The Ba***ds of Bollywood	Himself	Netflix	Hindi	Cameo appearance	
—N/a	Baahubali: Before the Beginning	Producer	Netflix	Hindi	Shelved	

=== Video games ===
Year	Title	Role	Notes	Ref.
2025	Death Stranding 2: On the Beach	The Adventurer	Cameo appearance	
