= S. S. Rajamouli =

Indian filmmaker (born 1973)

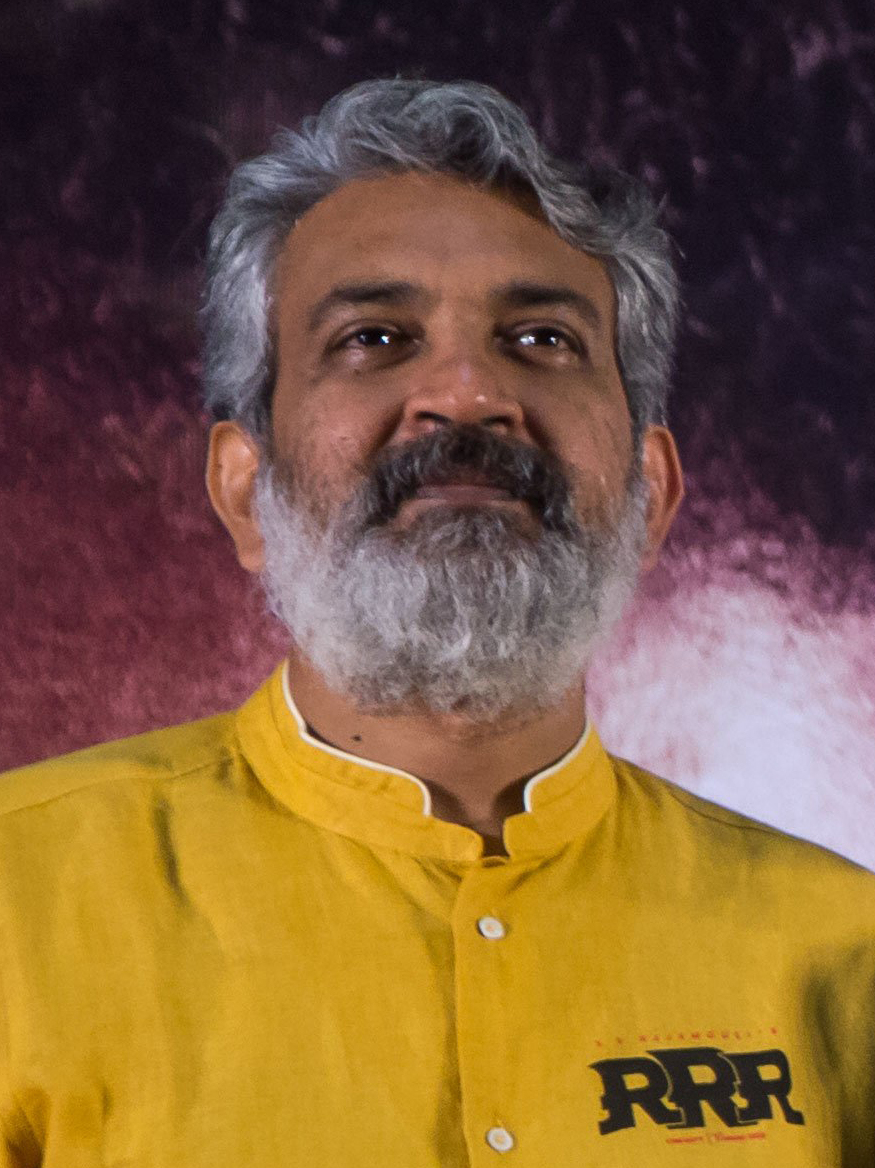
- Rajamouli in 2021
- Born: Koduri Srisaila Sri Rajamouli; 10 October 1973 (age 53); Amareshwara Camp, Mysore State, India (now in Karnataka, India)
- Other names: Jakkanna; Nandi
- Occupations: Film director; screenwriter; Actor
- Works: Filmography; cinematic style
- Spouse: Rama Rajamouli (m. 2001)
- Children: 2
- Father: V. Vijayendra Prasad
- Family: Koduri family
- Awards: Full list
- Honours: Padma Shri (2016)

Koduri Srisaila Sri Rajamouli (/ˈrɑːdʒəmaʊlɪ/ RAH-juh-mow-li, Telugu: [koːɖuːɾi sriːsɐi̯lɐ sriː ɾaːdʒɐmɐu̯ɭi]; born 10 October 1973), is an Indian film director and screenwriter who works in Telugu cinema. Known for his epic, action drama, and fantasy genre films, he is one of the most prolific and the highest-paid directors in Indian cinema. Rajamouli is a recipient of various national and international honours including a New York Film Critics Circle award, a Critics' Choice Movie Award, two Saturn Awards, four National Film Awards, five Nandi Awards, and five Filmfare Awards. In 2016, the Government of India honoured him with the Padma Shri, for his contributions in the field of art. In 2023, he was included on the Time's list of the 100 most influential people in the world. In 2026, his name was permanently added to the Mur des Cinéastes (the wall of filmmakers) at the prestigious Institut Lumière in Lyon, France, known as the birthplace of cinema.

Rajamouli has been described by film trade analyst Komal Nahta as "the biggest Indian film director ever" and by SOAS professor Rachel Dwyer as "India's most significant director today". He has directed twelve feature films, all of which have been box office successes. Three of his films—Baahubali: The Beginning (2015), Baahubali 2: The Conclusion (2017), and RRR (2022)—rank among the top 15 highest grossing-films in India. Each of these films was the most expensive Indian production at the time of its release. Baahubali 2 became the first Indian film to gross over ₹10 billion and held the record as the highest-grossing Indian film. It also sold over 100 million tickets, the highest for any film in India since Sholay (1975).

The 2009 fantasy action film, Magadheera was the highest-grossing Telugu film ever at the time of its release. Eega (2012) won nine awards at the Toronto After Dark Film Festival, including the Most Original Film. Baahubali films have received six Saturn Award nominations with Baahubali 2 winning the Best International Film. RRR received various international accolades including an Academy Award and a Golden Globe Award for the song "Naatu Naatu", and a Critics' Choice Movie Award for Best Foreign Language Film.

Rajamouli's films are typically characterized by their epic grandeur, stylized action sequences, unbridled heroism and larger-than-life characters with historical and mythological references. His films have been noted for their integration of CGI with practical effects. With his Baahubali films, he has pioneered the pan-Indian film movement. He is also credited for expanding the market of Telugu cinema and South Indian cinema into Northern India and international markets.

== Early life and background ==
Koduri Srisaila Sri Rajamouli was born on 10 October 1973 in a Telugu family to V. Vijayendra Prasad and Raja Nandini. His parents were staying in Amareshwara Camp in Raichur district of Mysore State (present-day Karnataka) at the time of his birth. Both his parents hail from Andhra Pradesh — his father from Kovvur near Rajahmundry and his mother from Visakhapatnam.

Rajamouli's father is a Kamma and his mother belonged to Kapu caste. Rajamouli's parents are ardent devotees of Lord Shiva. He was born after his mother had a dream when she visited the pilgrimage site of Srisailam. Hence, he was named Srisaila Sri Rajamouli. He has one elder sister who now lives in Australia. Rajamouli grew up in a joint family — his father and his five brothers lived in the same house with their families. Prasad's family had lands in Kovvur, which were lost when the railways lines were laid through them. Then, Prasad and his family moved to Karnataka from Kovvur in 1968. Prasad, along with his elder brother K. V. Sivashankar, bought seven acres of paddy fields in Hirekotikal village near Manvi in Raichur district. Their family moved back to Kovvur in 1977.

Rajamouli was educated in Kovvur till fourth standard and then shifted to Eluru where he studied till Intermediate first year. He then took a break of two years and finished his Intermediate second year in Kovvur. After that, he did not pursue any further formal education.

Rajamouli was passionate about storytelling right from his second standard. When he was seven years old, his grandmother introduced him to the epic story Ramayana, Mahabharata, and Bhagavata. At the same age, his father introduced him to Amar Chitra Katha comics that featured stories on Indian historical figures, religious legends and folktales. It had a huge impact on him and developed his penchant for larger-than-life characters. He would remember those stories and the films he watched and then re-tell them to his friends in his own way. His mother was keen on him learning English and would take him to watch English-language films in the nearby towns. She encouraged him to read comics and storybooks in his free time and never pressured him in academics. His father recollecting about Rajamouli's childhood noted, "he was not an ambitious child. For a long time, we did not know what interested him. He showed some inclination towards films. He played the role of young Krishna in a film I directed."

Rajamouli's paternal grandfather was a wealthy landlord who owned 360 acres of land. By the time Rajamouli was 10 or 11 years old, they lost much of their wealth. As his father Vijayendra Prasad and uncle Siva Shakthi Datta were passionate about filmmaking, they sold most of their remaining assets and shifted to Madras to make films. They started many films that went unfinished. They faced financial losses and started working as ghostwriters to make ends meet. Thirteen members of his extended family started living in a two-room apartment in Madras. Rajamouli recollects his family sitting together and making fun of themselves and their condition at the time, but they were never sad about it.

Later Prasad established himself as a screenwriter with films like Bobbili Simham (1994) and Gharana Bullodu (1995). Wanting to make another film, his father then co-produced (along with Katragadda Prasad) and directed a film called Ardhangi (1996) with his life savings. Rajamouli recalls about that film:

I was very actively involved in the project as an associate director. I felt that film was my child, even though I didn't direct the film. It was a miserable failure. My family went into a debt trap. It took us years to pick up and put the pieces together. All of that strongly stayed in my mind. That was a very low period for me. I then decided to never take anything for granted. It imbibed in me the work ethic to make everything perfect and interesting for the audience, no matter how small or unimportant that scene or shot might be. That lowest phase of my life taught me how I should work later on in my career.

== Career ==
=== Early work ===
Rajamouli started his film career as an apprentice since mid-1990s to the veteran film editor Kotagiri Venkateswara Rao and worked with him for six months. Rajamouli recollects, "Even in my early 20s, I didn't know how to plan for my future. My father would constantly scold me for doing nothing. I joined films just to get away from his nagging. Slowly, I found my love for direction." He worked at AVM recording theatre in Chennai for a few days. He also worked as an assistant director to Kranthi Kumar for some time. Then, he assisted his father Vijayendra Prasad for six years. He started writing for films but was always disappointed by the execution of his stories by other directors. His frustration as a writer motivated him to become a director so that he can bring out his vision as a writer perfectly onto the screen.

He then shifted to Hyderabad from Chennai and worked with his relative, Gunnam Gangaraju, from whom he learnt about the practical aspect of filmmaking. Later under the supervision of K. Raghavendra Rao, he directed social message-oriented commercials. He also directed a few advertisements for the Telugu Desam Party. He then worked for one and a half years as the director of the Telugu TV serial, Santhi Nivasam, along with Vara Mullapudi, which was produced by Raghavendra Rao. It aired on ETV. In an interview in 2005, Rajamouli called it the most arduous period in his life as he used to work for 17 hours a day. He recalled:

"My main aim while working in television was to get Mr Rao's approval. During my TV days, I didn't have much of an idea of what I was making. The good thing was that I was a hard worker, and I earned the nickname work devil."

=== 2001–2008: Film debut and breakthrough ===
In 2001, Raghavendra Rao offered Rajamouli the chance to direct a feature film for his production house titled, Student No: 1, which the latter accepted. Raghavendra Rao provided the screenplay in addition to supervising the direction. Rajamouli later regretted not working for a longer time as an assistant director. "When I made my first film Student No: 1, I didn't know how to use a crane because I never used a crane while I was doing my TV serial." Student No:1 was a coming of age romantic action film and was the second film of NTR Jr. in a lead role. Rajamouli would go onto collaborate with NTR Jr. in three more films. Released on 27 September 2001, the film marked the official debut of SS Rajamouli as a director; the film went on to become a critical and commercial success, and was NTR Jr.'s first successful film.

Rajamouli's second film was Simhadri (2003), again with NTR Jr. After his first film, he realised that the kind of films he wanted to make had more drama and action, and so he made Simhadri, an action film. It marked Rajamouli's first collaboration with his father Vijayendra Prasad who provided the story. Simhadri was also the first film penned by Rajamouli. The film emerged as a blockbuster and became one of the highest grossing Telugu films ever at the time.

In the two-year gap between Student No.1 and Simhadri, Rajamouli planned his first mythological film with Malayalam actor Mohanlal, but the film eventually got shelved. In 2015, Assistant art director Manu Jagath, who later worked as the art director for Baahubali, released several sketches he had drawn for the shelved Mohanlal project. During the same period he was also supposed to direct a fantasy film with Prakash Kovelamudi as the lead but the film was shelved due to financial reasons.

Rajamouli's third film was Sye (2004), starring Nithin and Genelia. He recalls, "I got plenty of offers after the success of Simhadri. But I deliberately made a decision not to make an emotionally charged mass film like Simhadri immediately. I don't want to get branded as mass director. Hence I did Sye, which is radically different compared to Simhadri." It was a first-of-its-kind film in Telugu cinema, in that it was based on the sport of Rugby. This film was also the first instance where Rajamouli collaborated with K. K. Senthil Kumar who would eventually work with him on seven more films. Sye was commercially successful and won four Nandi Awards. Sye made a huge impact on the Telugu popular culture through its popularisation of Rugby to the masses.

His next venture was Chatrapathi (2005), an action drama set in Vizag dealing with the plight of refugees. Chatrapathi starred Prabhas in the lead role with music composed by M. M. Keeravani and cinematography by Senthil Kumar. It was Rajamouli's fourth consecutive hit and became one of the highest grossing Telugu films of the year.

In his next project Vikramarkudu (2006), Rajamouli worked with Ravi Teja and Anushka Shetty. Rajamouli was attacked during the shooting of the film near Nanakramguda in Hyderabad. He suffered a hairline fracture on his hand and was admitted into a nearby Apollo hospital. Vikramarkudu was a breakthrough film for Anushka Shetty. The film was screened at the International Film Festival of India in the mainstream section. The film was a big success and was remade into several Indian languages including Kannada as Veera Madakari (2009), Tamil as Siruthai (2011), and Hindi as Rowdy Rathore (2012).

He then directed Yamadonga (2007), a fantasy action comedy film starring NTR Jr., Priyamani, Mohan Babu, and Mamata Mohandas. The plot follows Raja, a thief who is killed by his rivals. Raja's soul travels to Naraka (hell) to face the trial for his sins by Yama, the Hindu god of death and justice. The film was successful at the box-office and became one of the highest grossing Telugu films ever at the time.

Rajamouli started his own production company Visvamithra Creations named after the ancient Indian sage Visvamitra. Prabhas acted as Visvamitra for the logo shoot of the company. Yamadonga was produced under the Visvamithra Creations banner but the producers were Cherry and Urmila Gunnam with Rama Rajamouli presenting the film.

=== 2009–2014: Critical acclaim and recognition ===
Rajamouli's next venture was the fantasy-action film Magadheera (2009), starring Ram Charan and Kajal Aggarwal. Made on a budget of ₹350–440 million (US$7–10 million), it was the most expensive Telugu film at the time. (Note: Budget estimates of Magadheera vary. Independent estimates include ₹350 million (equivalent to ₹960 million or US$10 million in 2026) by The Times of India, ₹420 million (equivalent to ₹1.2 billion or US$12 million in 2026) by Mint, and ₹440 million (equivalent to ₹1.2 billion or US$13 million in 2026) by News18.) It was the first Telugu film to list a "visual effects producer" in its credits. Magadheera became one of the biggest commercial successes in Telugu cinema and was the highest-grossing Telugu film at the end of its theatrical run. For Magadheera, Rajamouli won the Nandi Award for Best Director and Filmfare Award for Best Director – Telugu. The film also won the National Award for Best Choreography and Best Special Effects at the 57th National Film Awards and a total of six Filmfare Awards South and nine Nandi Awards. The film's success catapulted both the leads into stardom.

Magadheera was dubbed into Tamil as Maaveeran and into Malayalam as Dheera: The Warrior and was released on 27 May 2011. Both the dubbed versions were successful and earned a good fan base for Ram Charan in Tamil Nadu and Kerala. The Japanese-dubbed version of the film released in August 2018 and became one of the highest-grossing Indian films ever at the Japanese box office.

In 2010 he directed the action comedy film Maryada Ramanna starring Sunil and Saloni. Rajamouli watched the 1923 silent comedy film Our Hospitality and liked it immensely. He wanted to re-tell the same story in his own way. He tried to contact the original creators but found out that the original writers of the film were long dead and that the film's copyright had expired as it had been over 75 years since the film's release. His cousin S. S. Kanchi and him then adapted that story with a Rayalaseema backdrop focusing on the factional violence and hospitality that co-existed in the region. Regarding his decision to make a small film like Maryada Ramanna he remarked, "I decided that my next project would be Maryada Ramanna during Magadheera shooting itself because Magadheera is a one and half year project that demands lot of physical labour and mental strain. I didn't want to commit another physically exhausting film immediately after Magadheera."

Maryada Ramanna opened to favourable reviews from critics. It became one of the highest grossing Telugu films of 2010. It received four Nandi Awards, including Best Popular Feature Film. Maryada Ramanna was remade in Hindi as Son of Sardaar and into other languages like Kannada, Bengali, Tamil, and Malayalam. In 2012 Rajamouli stated in an interview with Maa TV that Maryada Ramanna was his personal favourite among all the films he had directed.

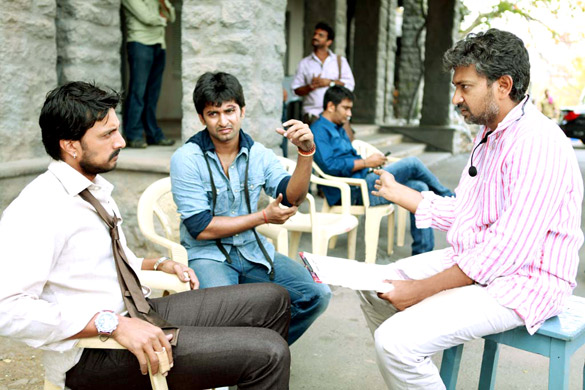
Sudeep, Nani, and Rajamouli on the sets of Eega

His next project was the fantasy action film Eega (2012). The film was produced by Sai Korrapati's Vaaraahi Chalana Chitram with an estimated budget of ₹300–400 million (US$6–7 million). It was simultaneously filmed in Tamil language with the title Naan Ee (transl. I, the Fly). The film stars Nani, Samantha, and Sudeep. The idea of Eega originated in the mid-1990s in Vijayendra Prasad's mind. At that time, he was joking about a housefly seeking revenge on a human in a conversation with his son Rajamouli. After completing Maryada Ramanna, Rajamouli reconsidered the concept after thinking of directing a film that was distinct from any other. He explained it thus:

When I started making films, I stuck to formula films for a while which did well at the box office. After a while, I was getting too comfortable with what I was doing, so I wanted to experiment with something completely different. I wanted to take the audience by surprise and that is when I went back to the story I had heard 16 years ago.

Upon release, the film received widespread critical acclaim including for Rajamouli's direction. It became one of the highest-grossing Telugu films of all time. The Tamil version Naan Ee and Malayalam version Eecha were also big hits at the box office. The Hindi dubbed version Makkhi underperformed at the box office which Rajamouli attributed to a poor promotional strategy. But the satellite rights of Makkhi were sold at a price of ₹80 million (equivalent to ₹160 million or US$1.8 million in 2026) to Star Gold, by far the highest price ever paid for the Hindi dub of a Telugu film at the time.

Eega was screened at various international film festivals including the 2013 Cannes Film Festival. (Note: The Telugu version of Eega was screened at L'Étrange Film Festival, 2013 Cannes Film Festival, the Panorama section of the 16th Shanghai International Film Festival and Puchon International Fantastic Film Festival. The film received Best Art Direction award at the Fantaspoa film festival of Brazil. The Tamil version Naan Ee was screened at the 10th Chennai International Film Festival.) The Telugu version won nine awards, including Most Original Film at the 8th annual Toronto After Dark Film Festival. Eega won two National Film Awards (Best Feature Film in Telugu and Best Special Effects) and five South Filmfare Awards including Best Telugu Film and Best Telugu Director. Speaking at an event, filmmaker Shekhar Kapur said regional cinema is surpassing Hindi cinema in content and story, and cited Eega as an example. Kapur said he was impressed with its story and use of technology, and called it "no less than a Hollywood superhero film". Eega was listed among "The 25 Best Foreign Films of the Decade" by The Ringer.

=== 2015–present: Pan-India and international acclaim ===
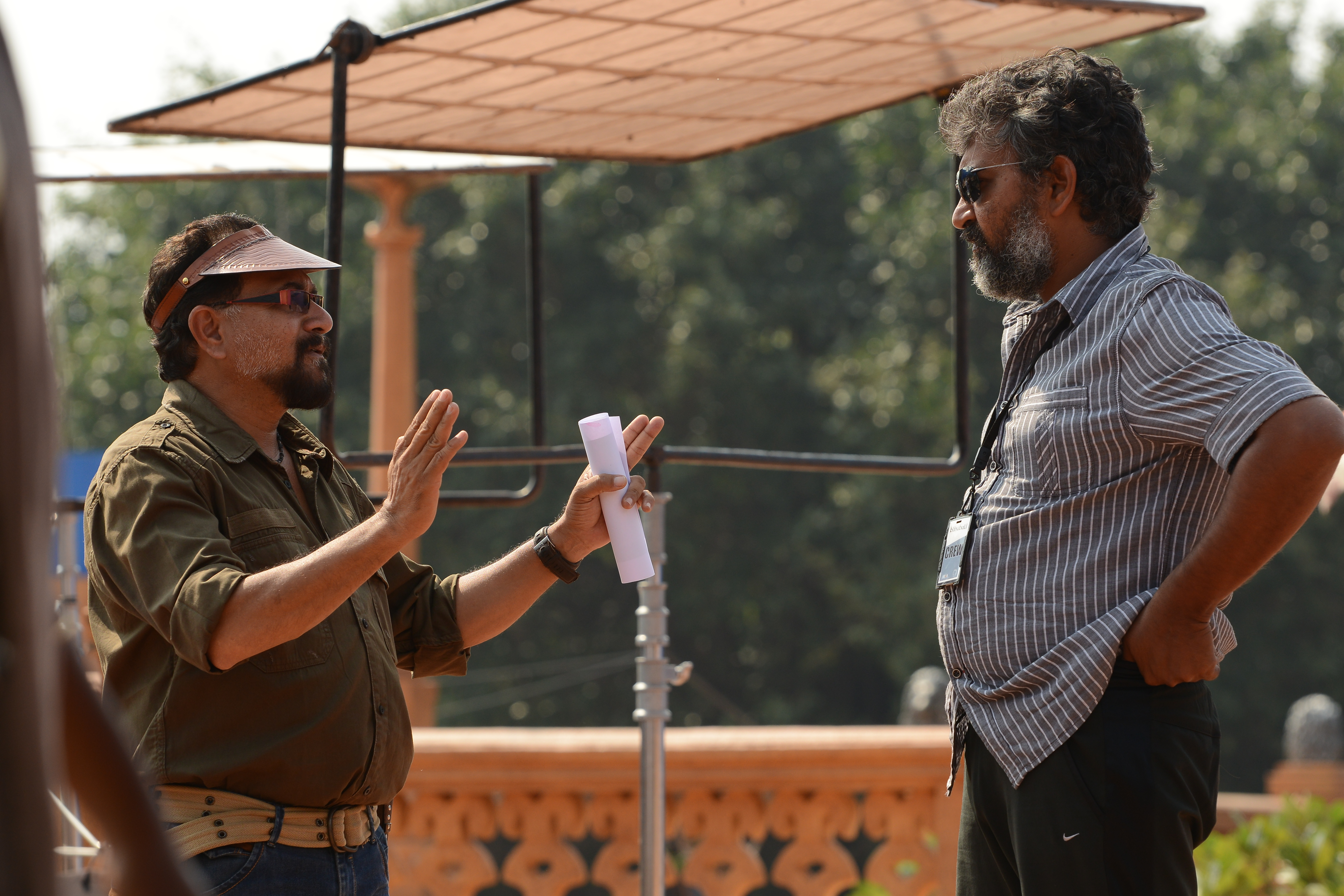
Rajamouli and Sabu Cyril on the set of Bahubali the Beginning

In 2015, he directed the epic action film Baahubali: The Beginning starring Prabhas, Rana Daggubati, Anushka Shetty, Ramya Krishna, Sathyaraj, and Tamanna. The film was shot using Arri Alexa XT camera, marking Rajamouli's first film shot using a digital camera. Rajamouli's work was lauded by The Hollywood Reporter, The Guardian and The Huffington Post. It became the second highest grossing Indian film of all time, and the highest grossing Indian film of all time within India. Its Hindi dubbed version also broke several records. It was the first dubbed film to collect over ₹1 billion (equivalent to ₹1.6 billion or US$18 million in 2026) nett at the Hindi box office and became the highest-grossing dubbed film in Hindi of all time. It was screened at various international film festivals including the 2016 Cannes Film Festival. (Note: Baahubali: The Beginning was screened at Open Cinema Strand of Busan International Film Festival, Indian Film Festival The Hague, Sitges Film Festival in Spain, Utopiales Film Festival in France, Golden Horse Film Festival in Taipei, Taiwan, Tallinn Black Nights Film Festival in Estonia, L'Etrange International Film Festival in Paris, Five Flavours Film Festival in Poland, Hawaii International Film Festival in Honolulu, Brussels International Fantastic Film Festival in Brussels, Belgium, and the Cannes Film Festival.) The making of the film was featured in BBC's documentary on 100 Years of Indian cinema, directed by Sanjeev Bhaskar.

Baahubali: The Beginning received several awards. It won the National Film Award for Best Feature Film and became the first Telugu film to win the award. It also won the National Award for Best Special Effects. At the 63rd Filmfare Awards South, the Telugu version won five awards from ten nominations, including Best Film and Best Director award for Rajamouli. It became the first Indian film to be nominated for Saturn Awards, receiving five nominations at the 42nd ceremony, including Best Fantasy Film.

In 2015, Rajamouli was named as the CNN-News18 Indian of the Year in Entertainment. In 2016, he was honoured with the Padma Shri, India's fourth highest civilian honour for his contributions towards the field of Art.

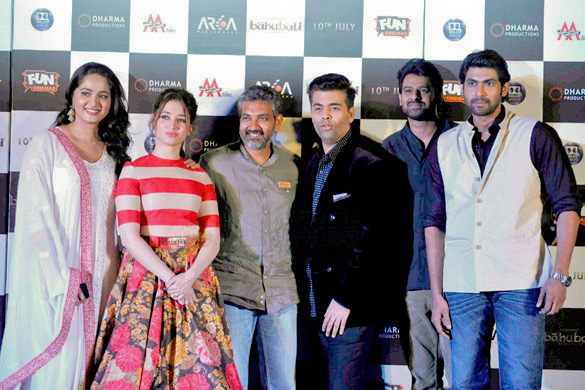
Anushka Shetty, Tamannaah, Rajamouli, Karan Johar, Prabhas, Rana Daggubati at the trailer launch of the Hindi version of Baahubali 2: The Conclusion

His next project was Baahubali 2: The Conclusion (2017), which served as both a sequel and a prequel to Baahubali: The Beginning. The film was premiered at the British Film Institute. It was made on an estimated budget of ₹2.5 billion (equivalent to ₹3.8 billion or US$41 million in 2026) and was the most expensive Indian film ever made at the time. Baahubali 2 was released on 28 April 2017 and later dubbed into Hindi, Malayalam, Japanese, Russian and Chinese. Released in conventional 2D and IMAX formats, Baahubali 2 was the first Telugu film to also release in 4K High Definition format.

Grossing ₹18.1 billion (equivalent to ₹28 billion or US$300 million in 2026) worldwide, the film surpassed PK (2014) to briefly become the highest grossing Indian film of all time, collecting approximately ₹8 billion (US$122.85 million) worldwide within just six days of its release. It became the first-ever Indian film to gross over ₹10 billion, doing so in just ten days. Within India, it set many film records, becoming the highest-grossing film in Hindi, as well as in its original Telugu language. It stands as the highest-grossing film in India, the second highest-grossing Indian film worldwide and the 39th highest-grossing film of 2017. The film sold over 100 million tickets during its box office run, the highest estimated admissions for any film in India since Sholay (1975). Baahubali 2 released to positive reviews from critics. It won the Saturn Award for Best International Film and three National Film Awards: Best Popular Film Providing Wholesome Entertainment, Best Special Effects and Best Stunt Choreographer.

The exceptional success of Baahubali films across different Indian languages, regions, and states kickstarted what has been termed the pan-Indian films movement where a film is simultaneously released in multiple Indian languages and is made to appeal to audiences across the country, cutting across the linguistic and cultural barriers. Several filmmakers and film analysts have credited Rajamouli for almost single-handedly expanding the reach and market of South Indian cinema to Northern India and beyond.

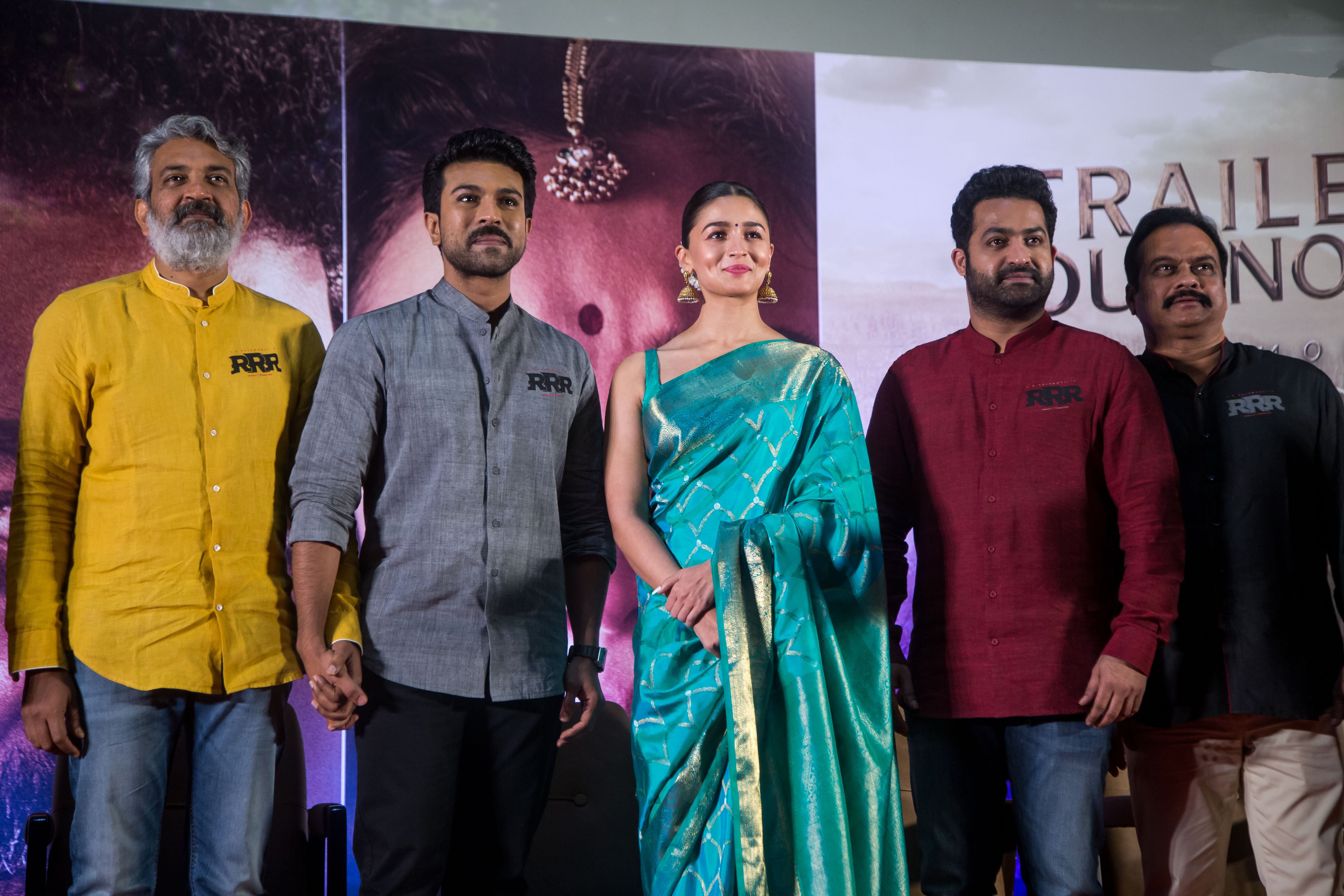
Rajamouli, Ram Charan, Alia Bhatt, NTR Jr., and DVV Danayya at the RRR Press Meet in Chennai

Rajamouli's subsequent film RRR (2022) is an epic action drama based on the lives of Indian revolutionaries, Alluri Sitarama Raju and Komaram Bheem. Made on an estimated budget of ₹5.5 billion (equivalent to ₹6.4 billion or US$68 million in 2026), it is the most expensive Indian film ever made. The film stars NTR Jr, Ram Charan, Ajay Devgn, and Alia Bhatt. RRR opened to positive reviews from critics with praise for the performances, particularly Rama Rao and Charan, and screenplay by Rajamouli.

With ₹2.4 billion (US$30.53 million) worldwide on its first day, RRR broke the record for the highest opening-day collection earned by an Indian film. RRR emerged as the highest-grossing film in its home market of Andhra Pradesh and Telangana, grossing over ₹4 billion (US$50.89 million) and surpassing Rajamouli's previous film Baahubali 2. The film grossed ₹12 billion (US$152.66 million) worldwide, setting several box office records for an Indian film, including the second-highest-grossing film in India and the third-highest-grossing Indian film. RRR is nominated in three categories at the 47th Saturn Awards including a Best Director nomination for Rajamouli. It was also nominated in Best Action / Adventure Film and Best International Film categories. Rajamouli won the New York Film Critics Circle Award for Best Director for the film. The film also won two Critics' Choice Movie Awards.

In September 2022, the director signed with the American talent agency Creative Artists Agency (CAA) in a move that has been described as a "coup for the agency".

=== Upcoming projects ===
In January 2025, Rajamouli began production of Varanasi with actor Mahesh Babu in their maiden collaboration. The film is touted to be a jungle adventure set in Africa. While attending the 2022 Toronto International Film Festival, Rajamouli revealed more details about the project: "My next film with Mahesh Babu will be a globetrotting action adventure. It's going to be a kind of James Bond or Indiana Jones film with Indian roots."

There were also reports of him planning an animated film rooted in Indian content. In August 2022, he revealed that he was working on a couple of scripts that would be suitable to be made as animation films.

Rajamouli frequently speaks about his intention to make a film based on the Indian epic Mahabharata in the future. He thinks it will be at least a four-part project requiring a time period of six to ten years. In May 2017 he noted, "I don't want to compromise in making it and the huge project is going to take 10 years perhaps. I am apprehensive as to whether I will be able to execute such a technically-superior project (in the immediate future)." He had also revealed that the film series may not feature established movie stars. "This is the kind of film that will not work out if I rope in stars. Once the different characters are designed, I would have to hunt for the right artists and mould them accordingly," he said. In July 2022 he said, "Mahabharata has been my long, long, long dream project, but it will take a long time for me to step into that ocean. Before I step into Mahabharata I want to make, maybe, three or four films." In May 2023, he said, "If I get to the point of making Mahabharata, it would take me a year just to read the versions of Mahabharata that are available in the country. At present, I can only assume that it would be a 10-part film."

He also expressed his wish on several occasions to make films on the historical rulers Sri Krishnadevaraya, Rajaraja Narendra, Kakatiyas and Rani Abbakka.

== Personal life ==
My personal opinions, my thoughts, and my lifestyle have nothing to do with my profession. I keep that completely separate. Professionally, I am different. I don't try to rub my thoughts on to my characters, or on to my storytelling.

— Rajamouli on mythological themes in his films despite him being an agnostic.

Rajamouli married Rama, sister-in-law of his cousin Keeravani in 2001. After their marriage, Rama worked as a costume designer for many of Rajamouli's films. He adopted Karthikeya, Rama's son from her previous marriage. The couple also has an adopted daughter Mayookha. Karthikeya is married to Pooja Prasad, niece of Telugu actor Jagapathi Babu.

Rajamouli's cousin, M. M. Keeravani has worked as the music composer for all of his films. His other cousins Kalyani Malik and M. M. Srilekha are also music composers. S. S. Kanchi, a screenwriter and actor known for his role in the sitcom Amrutham is also one of his cousins. He collaborated with Rajamouli as a script doctor on many of his films and also acted in four of his films. Raja Koduri, an Executive vice-president at Intel is also a cousin of his. Rajamouli considers K. Raghavendra Rao as his guru and mentor. He called Gunnam Gangaraju his philosopher and guide who made an impact on his worldview.

Rajamouli is nicknamed Jakkanna after the legendary c.12th century sculptor Jakanachari (known in Telugu as Jakkanna) who is credited with building numerous temples during the Hoysala reign. The moniker was coined by actor Rajeev Kanakala during the making of the TV serial Santhi Nivasam (c. 2000) directed by Rajamouli and was in reference to his work ethic and perfectionism like the famed sculptor.

Regarding his religious views, in a March 2022 interview, Rajamouli stated that "I don't believe in God or religion the way it is portrayed now. But if you ask me 'Do you believe in the existence of God?' I'd say 'I don't know'." At Beyond Fest 2022 in Los Angeles, Rajamouli said that he is not a Hindu in the religious sense, but considering it as Dharma, he is 'very much' a Hindu. "I am a follower of Hindu dharma", he said.

Rajamouli's films have been accused of using themes and imagery associated with Hindutva, though he has claimed that this is unintentional.

== Filmmaking style ==
Rajamouli's films are typically characterised by their epic grandeur, unbridled heroism and larger-than-life characters with a fascination for historical and mythological themes from ancient Indian texts. A self confessed "film freak", Rajamouli's penchant for filmmaking is best captured by the word "emotion". He often stated that his films are based on stories driven by human emotions. Revenge is a recurring theme in his films. Several of Rajamouli's films feature flashback episodes where the protagonist's backstory is revealed, typically in the second half of the film. This narrative style is used in Simhadri, Vikramarkudu, Magadheera, Baahubali: The Beginning, and RRR.

I’m very loyal to my action sequences. I just won’t put them in for the sake of it. I believe that human endurance and physical capabilities are unimaginable when they are emotionally charged. There are things that real people have achieved that we can’t imagine, but they happen once in a lifetime … The only thing is they happen quite a number of times in my films.

— Rajamouli on action sequences in his films.

Describing his films as “big-scale action movies driven by hard-core emotion”, Rajamouli considers himself to be a magnifying glass that enhances the various emotions of the characters on screen, and sees the presence of violent action as an integral factor that engages the viewer with on screen proceedings. "For me, the character being emotionally charged up at that moment to go into that action sequence is very, very important," said Rajamouli about action sequences in his films.

Rajamouli's films typically, are visual effects-heavy and he is one of the pioneering filmmakers in India in integrating computer-generated imagery (CGI) with live action. He mentions his preference for practical effects over CGI and likes to capture as much footage as possible in-camera.Rajamouli's craft in CGI has improved with time. The CGI in the underwater shark-fighting sequence in Chatrapathi was considered ambitious, but choppy. The CGI sequences in Magadheera, Eega, Baahubali, and RRR are more polished with each film improving upon the previous one.

While scaling up his work with "larger-than-life" themes over the years, Rajamouli maintained his signature style of filmmaking that allows audiences to simmer in the thrills and emotions of the story with less dialogue. All his films end with a print of his trademark circular stamp stating: "an S. S. Rajamouli film".

Film critic Baradwaj Rangan opined that Rajamouli is a "great storyteller" who takes up common concepts and develops them in a novel acceptable way. Production designer Sabu Cyril, a four-time National Award winner for Best Art Direction and who worked for the Baahubali duology, said his team came up with as many as 25,000 sketches to design the various grand sets for the film in order to satisfy the rigorous visualisation standards of Rajamouli, which were grand and at the same time gone into very minute details ensuring that every pillar and wall had the right design. Cyril said, "Rajamouli makes no compromises."

In 2022, Rajamouli participated in the British magazine Sight & Sound film polls of the year 2022. Held once every ten years, the magazine asks popular contemporary writers and directors to name their ten personal favourite films. Rajamouli listed the following ten films in order: Forrest Gump (1994); Mayabazar (1957); Raiders of the Lost Ark (1981); Kung Fu Panda (2008); Aladdin (1992); Braveheart (1995); Apocalypto (2007); Ben-Hur (1959); Django Unchained (2012) and The Lion King (1994).

== Filmography ==
Key
†	Denotes films that have not yet been released

Directed features
Year	Title
2001	Student No: 1
2003	Simhadri
2004	Sye
2005	Chatrapathi
2006	Vikramarkudu
2007	Yamadonga
2009	Magadheera
2010	Maryada Ramanna
2012	Eega
2015	Baahubali: The Beginning
2017	Baahubali 2: The Conclusion
2022	RRR
2027	Varanasi †

S. S. Rajamouli box office performance statistics
Year	Title	Budget (est.)	Box-office (est.)		Ref.
			Worldwide Share (Note: Box-office figures are reported in the form of either gross receipts or distributor share (distributor rentals). For older films, only the box-office share figures are available. The distributor share of a film is the box-office gross less the exhibitor's cut and taxes. For more details, see Distributor rentals.)	Worldwide Gross	
2001	Student No: 1	₹18 million (US$381,471.51)	₹120 million (US$2.54 million)	₹220 million (US$4.66 million)	
2003	Simhadri	₹85 million (US$1.82 million)	₹265 million (US$5.69 million)	₹460 million (US$9.88 million)	
2004	Sye	₹102 million (US$2.25 million)	₹110 million (US$2.43 million)	₹180 million (US$3.97 million)	
2005	Chatrapathi	₹125 million (US$2.83 million)	₹210 million (US$4.76 million)	₹360 million (US$8.16 million)	
2006	Vikramarkudu	₹110 million (US$2.43 million)	₹190 million (US$4.19 million)	₹360 million (US$7.95 million)	
2007	Yamadonga	₹180–200 million ($4.3–4.8 million)	₹290 million (US$7.01 million)	₹500 million (US$12.09 million)	
2009	Magadheera	₹350–440 million ($7–10 million)	₹830 million (US$17.15 million) (Note: Magadheera collected a distributor's share of ₹736 million (US$15.21 million) in its Telugu version and approximately ₹830 million (US$17.15 million) when including its dubbed versions.)	₹1.5 billion (US$30.99 million)	
2010	Maryada Ramanna	₹120–140 million ($2.6–3.1 million)	₹290 million (US$6.34 million)	₹400 million (US$8.75 million)	
2012	Eega	₹300–400 million ($6–7 million) (Note: The New Indian Express quoted Nani estimating the film's budget as ₹260 million (US$4.87 million), S. S. Rajamouli estimated the film's budget to be around ₹300–350 million ($5.61–6.55 million) in an interview with The Hindu, and Rajeev Kamineni of PVP Cinema estimated the film's budget as ₹400 million (US$7.49 million) in an interview with The Times of India.)	₹540 million ($10 million)	₹1.3 billion ($23 million)	
2015	Baahubali: The Beginning	₹1.8 billion (US$28.06 million)	₹3.02 billion (US$47.08 million)	₹6.5 billion (US$101.32 million)	
2017	Baahubali 2: The Conclusion	₹2.5 billion (US$38.39 million)	₹8.31 billion (US$127.61 million) (Note: Excluding China and Japan box office share)	₹18.1 billion (US$277.94 million)	
2022	RRR	₹5.5 billion (US$69.97 million)	₹6.24 billion (US$79.38 million) (Note: Excluding Japan box office share)	₹13.87 billion (US$176.45 million)	
2025	Baahubali: The Epic	₹400 million (US$4.3 million)	₹361.5 million (US$3.9 million)	₹723.1 million (US$7.7 million)	

== Awards and recognition ==
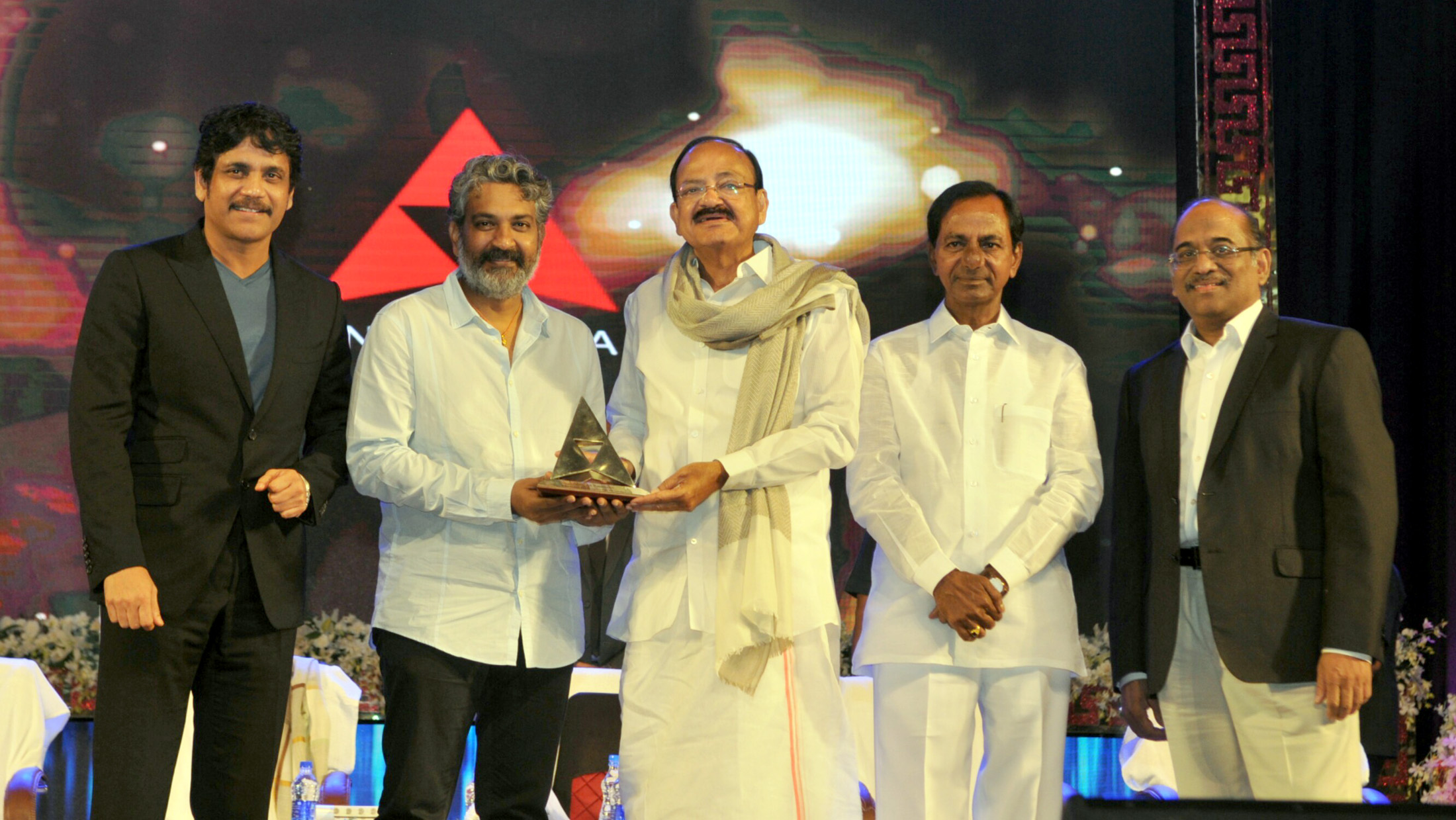
Rajamouli receiving the ANR National Award from the vice-president of India Venkaiah Naidu, September 2017.

Rajamouli is a recipient of several awards including four National Film Awards, five Filmfare Awards, and five state Nandi Awards. In 2015, Rajamouli was named CNN-News18 Indian of the Year in Entertainment. The Government of India honoured him with Padma Shri in 2016, for his contributions to the field of Art.

His films have been screened at various film festivals such as Cannes Film Festival, Shanghai International Film Festival, Busan International Film Festival, Sitges Film Festival among others. A retrospective of Rajamouli's films was held from 26 September to 10 October 2022, in a special programme titled "From Tollywood to Hollywood" as part of the 10th edition of Beyond Fest, the highest attended genre festival in the U.S.

Rajamouli was cited as an influence by directors Prashanth Neel and Ayan Mukerji. Filmmaker and actor Rahul Ravindran thinks Rajamouli alone has a foresight to predict the success of a script. Matt Groening, creator of the television shows The Simpsons and Futurama, while discussing his inspiration for Disenchantment mentioned that Rajamouli made some of his favourite films of the last decade, especially Magadheera. He added that the show has homages to Rajamouli. Filmmaker Mani Ratnam mentioned that the success of Baahubali inspired him to work on Ponniyin Selvan.

Rajamouli has redefined the reach of regional cinema consistently through his films, starting with Eega [2012] to the Baahubali series, and now with RRR. The entire concept of pan-Indian films came from him when he succeeded with Eega across many Indian languages. This opened up this concept. Thanks to his vision, today, a lot of films are able to be made on a bigger budget targeted at a pan-Indian audience. Rajamouli stands tall among all Indian filmmakers for his vision, innovation, and expansion of the regional language market at a global level.

— Film producer G. Dhananjayan on Rajamouli

Through his Baahubali films, Rajamouli is credited with pioneering the pan-Indian films movement. Gautam Jain of Ormax Media, a media and entertainment consulting firm writes, "Before the release of Bahubali: The Beginning (2015), the term 'Pan India film' did not exist in film media or audience lingo." He also called him the 'original Pan India filmmaker' and the 'most successful Pan India filmmaker'. Vijay Kiragandur, the producer of the KGF films credited Rajamouli for making Baahubali films and giving him the confidence to take KGF: Chapter 1 to audiences across the country.

Rachel Dwyer, professor of Indian Cultures and Cinema at SOAS University of London remarked that Rajamouli is India's most significant director at present who can make a film in a south Indian language that becomes a pan-Indian film which can also be enjoyed overseas audience.

Film trade analyst Komal Nahta, citing the successful track record of Rajamouli called him the "biggest Indian film director ever". Manoj Kumar R of The Indian Express wrote, "It's a rarity to find a director who sells more tickets than the leading stars of a movie. And in that respect, he has monopolized that space." Sagar Tetali of Film Companion noted, that the success of Rajamouli's films is the triumph of directorial ambition over the actor-star image — centred film culture in Telugu cinema." At the 95th Academy Awards, "Naatu Naatu" from RRR became the first song from an Indian film to win the Academy Award for Best Original Song. He was invited to join the Academy of Motion Picture Arts and Sciences in June 2024.

== In popular culture ==
- A Netflix documentary Modern Masters: SS Rajamouli directed by Raghav Khanna and Tanvi Ajinkya, based on Rajamouli's life and career was released in 2024.
- Rajamouli and his son both appear in the 2025 video game Death Stranding 2: On the Beach from Hideo Kojima in the roles of the Adventurer and the Adventurer's Son.

== See also ==
- List of Indian Golden Globe Award winners and nominees
