= List of awards and nominations received by S. S. Rajamouli =

S. S. Rajamouli awards and nominations
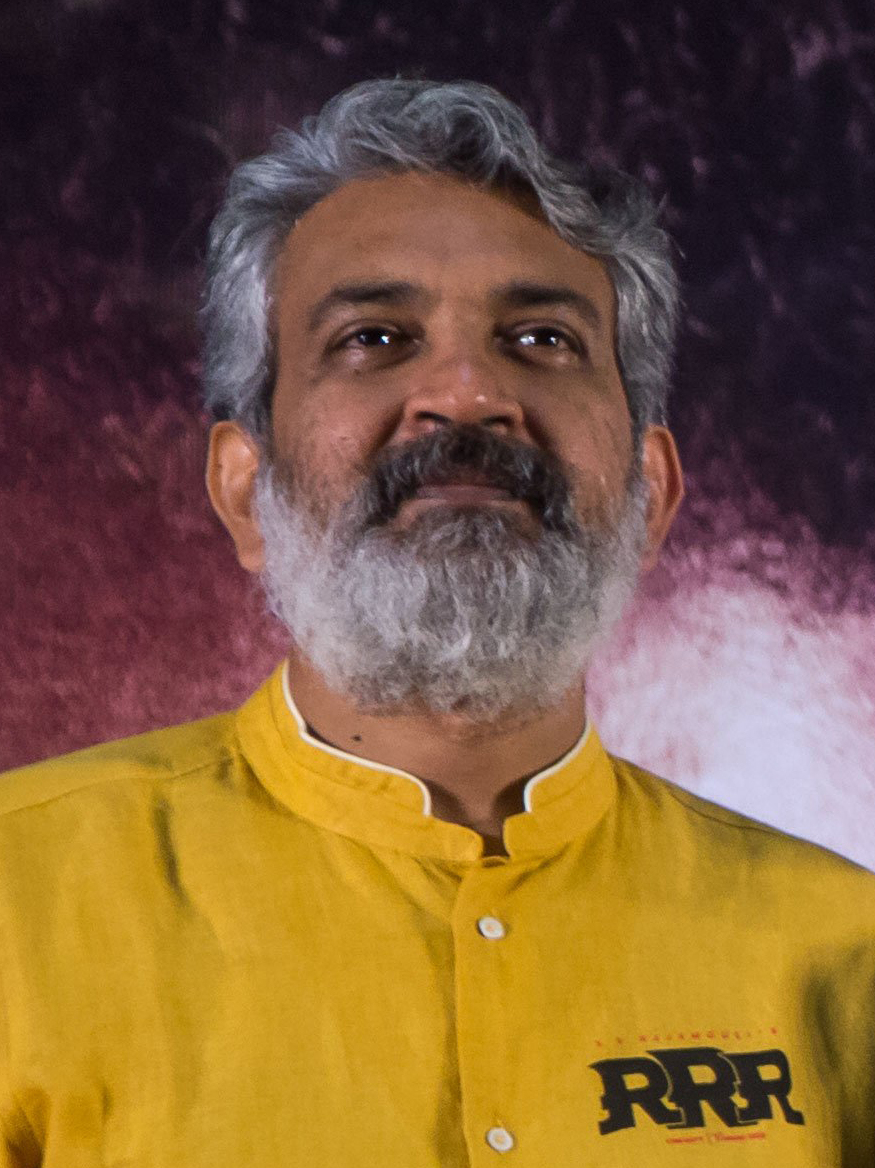
- Rajamouli in 2021
Awards and nominations
Award	Wins	Nominations

Totals (Note: Certain award groups do not simply award one winner. They acknowledge several different recipients, have runners-up, and have third place. Since this is a specific recognition and is different from losing an award, runner-up mentions are considered wins in this award tally. For simplification and to avoid errors, each award in this list has been presumed to have had a prior nomination.)
- Wins: 25
- Nominations: 43

S. S. Rajamouli is an Indian film director and screenwriter who primarily works in Telugu cinema. He is the highest paid director in India, and is known for his action, fantasy, and epic genre films. Three of his films, Baahubali: The Beginning (2015), Baahubali 2: The Conclusion (2017) and RRR (2022) are among the top six highest grossing-films in India to date.

== Awards and nominations ==
Name of the award ceremony, year presented, nominee(s) of the award, award category, and the result of the nominationAwards and nominations received by S. S. Rajamouli
Award	Year (Note: Indicates the year of ceremony.)	Nominated work	Category	Result	Ref.
ANR National Award	2017	—N/a	—N/a	Won	
Austin Film Critics Association	2022	RRR	Best Director	Nominated	
Chicago Film Critics Association	2022	RRR	Best Director	Nominated	
CineMAA Awards	2009	Magadheera	Best Director	Won	
CineMAA Awards	2015	Baahubali: The Beginning	Best Director	Won	
CNN–News18 Indian of the Year	2015	—N/a	Entertainment	Won	
CNN–News18 Indian of the Year	2022	—N/a	Entertainment	Won	
Critics' Choice Movie Awards	2023	RRR	Best Director	Nominated	
Filmfare Awards South	2004	Simhadri	Best Director	Nominated	
Filmfare Awards South	2005	Sye	Best Director	Nominated	
Filmfare Awards South	2006	Chatrapathi	Best Director	Nominated	
Filmfare Awards South	2007	Vikramarkudu	Best Director	Nominated	
Filmfare Awards South	2008	Yamadonga	Best Director	Nominated	
Filmfare Awards South	2009	Magadheera	Best Director	Won	
Filmfare Awards South	2012	Eega	Best Director	Won	
Filmfare Awards South	2015	Baahubali: The Beginning	Best Director	Won	
Filmfare Awards South	2018	Baahubali 2: The Conclusion	Best Director	Won	
Filmfare Awards South	2024	RRR	Best Director	Won	
Hollywood Critics Association Awards	2023	RRR	Best Director	Nominated	
IIFA Utsavam	2015	Baahubali: The Beginning	Best Director – Tamil	Nominated	
IIFA Utsavam	2015	Baahubali: The Beginning	Best Director – Telugu	Won	
Los Angeles Film Critics Association	2022	RRR	Best Director	Runner-up	
Macau International Movie Festival	2017	Baahubali 2: The Conclusion	Best Director	Nominated	
Nandi Awards	2009	Magadheera	Best Director	Won	
Nandi Awards	2012	Eega	Best Director	Won	
Nandi Awards	2012	Eega	Best Screenplay Writer	Won	
Nandi Awards	2014	—N/a	BN Reddy National Award	Won	
Nandi Awards	2015	Baahubali: The Beginning	Best Director	Won	
National Film Awards	2012	Eega	Best Feature Film in Telugu	Won	
National Film Awards	2015	Baahubali: The Beginning	Best Feature Film	Won	
National Film Awards	2017	Baahubali 2: The Conclusion	Best Popular Film Providing Wholesome Entertainment	Won	
National Film Awards	2021	RRR	Best Popular Film Providing Wholesome Entertainment	Won	
New York Film Critics Circle	2022	RRR	Best Director	Won	
Saturn Awards	2022	RRR	Best Director	Nominated	
South Indian International Movie Awards	2012	Eega	Best Director – Telugu	Nominated	
South Indian International Movie Awards	2015	Baahubali: The Beginning	Best Director – Telugu	Won	
South Indian International Movie Awards	2017	Baahubali 2: The Conclusion	Best Director – Telugu	Won	
South Scope Cine Awards	2010	Magadheera	Best Director	Won	
Utah Film Critics Association	2022	RRR	Best Director	Runner-up	
Vijay Awards	2013	Naan Ee	Best Director	Nominated	
Vijay Awards	2013	Naan Ee	Best Story, Screenplay Writer	Nominated	
Vijay Awards	2013	Naan Ee	Favorite Director	Nominated	
Vijay Awards	2018	Baahubali 2: The Conclusion	Best Director	Nominated	

== Honours ==
Year	Award	Honouring body	Ref
2016	Padma Shri	Government of India	
