= Hire Kotnekal =

- Village
- Location within Karnataka Location within India
- Coordinates: 15°57′46″N 76°57′4″E
- Country: India
- State: Karnataka
- District: Raichur district
- Taluk: Manvi

Languages
  - Official: Kannada
- Time zone: UTC+5:30 (IST)
- Telephone code: 08538
- Vehicle registration: KA 36

Hire Kotnekal is a village in the Manvi taluk of Raichur district in the Indian state of Karnataka. Hire Kotnekal is located west to Manvi town. Hire Kotnekal lies on road connecting Manvi and Sindhanur.

== Demographics ==
As of 2001 India census, Hire Kotnekal had a population of 7662 with 3835 males and 3827 females.

== See also ==
- Kalmala
- Devadurga
- Lingasugur
- Sindhanur
- Raichur
