= Magadheera =

2009 Indian film by S. S. Rajamouli

- Theatrical release poster
- Directed by: S. S. Rajamouli
- Screenplay by: S. S. Rajamouli
- Dialogues by: M. Rathnam
- Story by: V. Vijayendra Prasad
- Produced by: Allu Aravind; B. V. S. N. Prasad (Co-producer)
- Starring: Ram Charan; Kajal Aggarwal; Dev Gill; Srihari
- Cinematography: K. K. Senthil Kumar; Chota K. Naidu (1 song)
- Visual effects by: R. C. Kamalakannan; FireFly
- Edited by: Kotagiri Venkateswara Rao
- Music by: M. M. Keeravani
- Production companies: Geetha Arts; Sri Venkateswara Cine Chitra
- Distributed by: Geetha Arts
- Release date: 31 July 2009
- Running time: 158 minutes 167 minutes (extended theatrical version)
- Country: India
- Language: Telugu
- Budget: ₹35 crore (US$3.6 million)
- Box office: ₹150 crore (US$16 million)

Magadheera (lit. 'Great Warrior') is a 2009 Indian Telugu-language epic romantic fantasy action film co-written and directed by S. S. Rajamouli, based on a story by V. Vijayendra Prasad. Produced by Allu Aravind under Geetha Arts, the film stars Ram Charan, Kajal Aggarwal, Dev Gill and Srihari. The film follows a street-bike racer who discovers his connection to a 17th-century warrior through reincarnation and sets out to rescue his lover from a vengeful adversary tied to their past lives.

Made on a Budget of ₹45 crore (US$4.7 million), Magadheera was the most expensive Telugu film at the time of its release. The film's principal photography commenced on 19 March 2008. The film's soundtrack and background score were composed by M. M. Keeravani, with cinematography by K. K. Senthil Kumar. Action sequences were choreographed by Peter Hein and the duo Ram–Lakshman.

Magadheera was released on 31 July 2009 to critical acclaim and commercial success. It became the first Telugu film to enter the 100 crore club, collecting a distributors' share of ₹73 crore (US$7.6 million) in its Telugu version and grossing over ₹150.8 crore (US$16 million) during its initial theatrical run. It became the highest-grossing Telugu film in history at the time. Magadheera became the second Telugu film after Pokiri (2006) to achieve a reported 1,000-day theatrical screening milestone. The film won the National Award for Best Choreography and Best Special Effects at the 57th National Film Awards, along with six Filmfare Awards, and nine Nandi Awards.

Magadheera was the first Telugu film to be released in the Blu-ray format in India. It was later dubbed into Tamil as Maveeran and Malayalam as Dheera: The Warrior, both released on 27 May 2011. The Japanese-dubbed version, released in August 2018, became one of the highest-grossing Indian films at the Japanese box office. The film was remade in Odia as Megha Sabarire Asiba Pheri (2010) and in Bengali as Yoddha: The Warrior (2014).

== Plot ==
In 1609 CE, atop the cliffside Bhairavakona temple in the Aravalli Range, a dying princess, Mithravinda Devi, begs the royal warrior Kaala Bhairava to confess his love for her. Before he can speak, she succumbs to her wounds and slips off the cliff; Bhairava leaps after her but fails to catch her, falling to his death. Assessing the tragic scene, a powerful invading Muslim general named Sher Khan retrieves Bhairava's armor and solemnly prophesies that the warrior will be reborn to reclaim his lost love.

Four hundred years later, in 2009, Harsha is a street-bike racer in Hyderabad. While casually moving through a crowd, his hand briefly brushes against that of a woman trying to board an auto-rickshaw. The physical contact triggers vivid, inexplicable historical visions. Determined to find her, Harsha unknowingly asks the woman herself, Indira "Indu", for help, not realizing she is the same person. Believing Harsha is an aggressive stalker, Indu mischievously conceals her identity and exploits his infatuation for personal favors. However, after Harsha selflessly defends her from local harassers, she develops genuine affection for him.

Meanwhile, Indu's father, Pratap, has been illegally evicted from their ancestral palace in Udaigarh, Rajasthan, by his late sister's husband, Omdev. To secure unhindered control of the estate, Omdev's ruthless son, Raghuveer, executes several lawyers before traveling to Hyderabad to eliminate Pratap. Upon encountering Indu, Raghuveer becomes deeply infatuated with her. When his father dismisses his obsession, Raghuveer murders Omdev, frames it as a natural death, and manipulates Pratap and Indu by returning their ancestral palace to earn their absolute trust.

One night, while attempting to touch a sleeping Indu, Raghuveer experiences a violent vision of a warrior slicing his throat. Seeking guidance, he consults Ghora, tantric priest, who reveals their past lives: 400 years prior, Raghuveer was Ranadev Billa, the treasonous commander-in-chief of Udaigarh who coveted Princess Mithravinda (Indu) and was killed by her protector, Kaala Bhairava (Harsha). Ghora warns that Bhairava has also reincarnated and must be eliminated before Indu's past memories awaken, or Raghuveer will lose her forever. Concurrently, Harsha discovers Indu’s initial deception, leading to a playful confrontation that culminates in the two confessing their love. When Bhupathi enthusiastically approves their marriage, Raghuveer murders Pratap, frames Harsha for the crime, and abducts a traumatized Indu in a helicopter. During the struggle, a physical touch from Indu throws Harsha into a lake, fully awakening his memories of his past life.

Past: In 1609, Udaigarh is ruled by King Vikram Singh, who faces an imminent, massive invasion by Emperor Sher Khan. The kingdom's premier warrior, Kaala Bhairava, is deeply in love with Princess Mithravinda, who completely reciprocates his feelings, though military duty stops him from expressing it. Ranadev Billa, the king's nephew, desires both the throne and Mithravinda, forcing a royal duel where the loser is banished. Bhairava wins decisively, resulting in Ranadev's exile. However, King Vikram Singh privately implores Bhairava to reject Mithravinda's romantic advances, fearing the warrior will perish in the upcoming war and leave the princess a widowed ascetic. A heartbroken Bhairava complies out of loyalty. Bhairava escorts Mithravinda and the royal entourage to the Bhairavakona temple to seek divine blessings before the war. Frustrated by his emotional distance, Mithravinda disrupts the ritual and paints Bhairava's portrait on a rock wall using her own blood. Their confrontation is shattered when an injured soldier reveals that Ranadev has allied with Sher Khan, assassinated King Vikram Singh, and is marching on the temple. Arriving at the cliff, Sher Khan, fascinated by Bhairava's reputation, challenges him to single-handedly defeat 100 elite soldiers. Although Bhairava successfully massacres the forces, he is left critically wounded. Deeply moved by his unmatched valor, Sher Khan calls a truce and befriends him. Defying the Emperor's order to stop, a vengeful Ranadev stabs Mithravinda from behind before Bhairava can react; a dying Bhairava immediately decapitates Ranadev. As Mithravinda falls from the cliff, the 1609 timeline ends with their tragic, unfulfilled deaths.

Present: Harsha is pulled from the lake and rescued by Solomon, an influential fisherman who is the reincarnation of Sher Khan. Remembering his past identity, Harsha travels to Udaigarh with Solomon. Learning from Ghora that Indu's memories must be triggered at the original site within the day, Harsha and Solomon covertly rescue Indu and bring her to the ruined Bhairavakona temple. During the pursuit, an enraged Raghuveer accidentally kills Ghora. Harsha desperately tries to convince Indu of their past life, but she remains confused and untrusting. Raghuveer arrives via helicopter to reclaim her, but as Indu looks past him, she spots the 400-year-old blood painting of Bhairava on the temple wall. The visual instantly triggers her memories, and she tearfully reunites with Harsha.

A final, brutal duel ensues between Harsha and Raghuveer. When Raghuveer's mercenaries attempt to use the helicopter's spinning rotors to shred Harsha, Solomon heroically rams his car into the aircraft, destroying it. Realizing his total defeat, a desperate Raghuveer grabs Indu and attempts to drag her off the cliff with him. Harsha leaps forward, severing Raghuveer's hand mid-air to save Indu, while Raghuveer falls to his death. With the ancient cycle finally completed, Harsha and Indu safely reunite.

== Cast ==
- Ram Charan as Kaala Bhairava/Harsha
- Kajal Aggarwal as Princess Mitra/Indu (Voice dubbed by Sowmya Sharma)
- Dev Gill as King Ranadev Billa/Raghuveer (Voice dubbed by P. Ravi Shankar)
- Srihari as Emperor Sher Khan/Solomon
- Sunil as Harsha’s friend
- Surya as Bhupathi Varma, Indu's father
- Sameer Hasan as Maan Singh, Sher Khan's close confidante, and an admirer of Kaala Bhairava
- Subbaraya Sarma as Gurudevulu, Chief priest of Udaigarh Kingdom
- Rao Ramesh as Ghora, Raghuveer's family priest
- Sarath Babu as King Vikram Singh, Mitra’s father
- Chatrapathi Sekhar as Raghuveer's trusted henchman
- Brahmanandam as Kittu, Indu's neighbour
- Hema as Sasikala, Kittu's doubting wife

=== Cameo appearances ===
- Chiranjeevi featured after the song “Bangaru Kodipetta Remix” (archival footage was also used from the same song)
- Mumaith Khan as Reshma, the street bike race organizer. She also appears in "Bangaru Kodipetta"
- Saloni Aswani as Apilli, Solomon's love interest
- Noel Sean as Jayaram
- Kim Sharma as Hamsa, a dancer who appears in the item song "Jorsey"
- Prabhas Sreenu appears in the song "Jorsey"
- Amrapali Dubey as a girlfriend of Shyam, a biker

== Production ==
=== Development ===
"My father Vijayendra Prasad prepared a story for a film titled Jagadeka Veerudu with Krishna as a hero in the direction of Sagar. They didn't like that concept and it was turned down. I was working as an assistant to my father at that time. I always wanted to do that story and it required a huge budget. When I was granted a big budget from Allu Aravind for Charan's movie, I picked this subject up.

I watched DVDs of Alfred Hitchcock's TV series before making Magadheera. What intrigued me is that he reveals the entire plot in the beginning and is still able to maintain the suspense by showing how the protagonist does it. It became an eye-opener for me. That is the reason why I revealed the story of the movie right on the film's launch. Opening the film with a flashback scene is influenced by Alfred Hitchcock."

— S. S. Rajamouli on the genesis of the film

Screenwriter Vijayendra Prasad prepared a story for a film titled Jagadeka Veerudu with Krishna as the lead in the direction of Sagar. That story is about a bodyguard who serves a Rajamatha (queen mother). He fights 100 warriors and dies in his attempt to re-enthrone the Rajamatha after she is overthrown by her conspirators. He is reborn after 400 years and fulfills his ambition of placing her on the throne by making her a Chief Minister or a popular social worker like Medha Patkar. It was rejected as they didn't like the concept.

After fifteen years, Prasad's son S. S. Rajamouli selected this script for the film he was to direct with Ram Charan under Geetha Arts banner. But, he made several changes to it. Rajamouli re-characterized the Rajamatha character as a princess to create a vital love story for the film, as he felt that the relationship between a queen and a bodyguard would be only about loyalty and honesty.

Production for the film was officially launched on 2 March 2008 at Film Nagar Cultural Center (FNCC) in Hyderabad. B. V. S. N. Prasad co-produced the film with Allu Aravind under his production banner, Geetha Arts. M. Rathnam was announced as the dialogue writer while Rajamouli's usual collaborators K. K. Senthil Kumar, Kotagiri Venkateswara Rao, and M. M. Keeravani worked on the film's cinematography, editing, and music respectively. After many potential titles, Magadheera was considered and finalised in early February 2009.

=== Casting ===
After considering several actresses (including Tamannaah) for the princess role, Kajal Aggarwal was selected by Rajamouli as the female lead opposite Ram Charan after conducting a photo shoot in his office. Rajamouli said that he wanted to cast her as the female lead in Yamadonga (2007) after her Telugu debut Lakshmi Kalyanam (2007), but she was unavailable. He added that he wanted somebody "good looking, who would look like a princess and who had dates available" and finalized her because she met all of these prerequisites. After conducting her photoshoot, Rajamouli explained the story and Mithra's characterization to her in 45 minutes. He said she needed to treat the hero arrogantly, but do so out of love for the hero. Kajal kept this in mind and acted accordingly while playing the dual roles of a princess from 400 years ago and a modern-day college student. Kajal called both her roles "unique and challenging".

Dev Gill was selected to portray the film's antagonist. Rajamouli was criticized for selecting him considering Gill's previous film, Krishnarjuna (2008), but remained adamant about casting him. He said that he had to cast a good-looking man as the film's villain because the heroine needed to find him trustworthy. For this film, Gill had to practice horse riding in Ramoji Film City; Ram Charan was already an experienced equestrian. Srihari was cast in his role in the film in early April 2008. Kim Sharma was selected to perform one of the two item numbers in the film in early June 2008. Saloni Aswani made a cameo appearance in the film and shot for three days. She was subsequently signed for Rajamouli's next project, Maryada Ramanna (2010), before Magadheera was even released.

Rao Ramesh was cast as a tantrik who helps Gill's character in the present era. Mumaith Khan was selected for another item number, a remix version of the hit song "Bangaru Kodipetta" from Gharana Mogudu (1992); Gharana Mogudu's music was also composed by M. M. Keeravani. Chiranjeevi made a special appearance after the song, making Magadheera the first film he appeared in after his entry into politics. When Rajamouli suggested the idea of a cameo appearance, Chiranjeevi was initially hesitant till the director narrated the complete sequence and the importance of the song.

=== Costume design ===
"The color scheme was decided at the beginning itself with Senthil, Ravinder, and Rajamouli. There was a lot of coordination with the sets and the lighting schemes. The story has a Rajasthan backdrop so I had to look up old books available and the Internet for references to design the ancient costumes.

For Yamadonga, there were direct references to get-ups and one had to improvise upon them. Whereas here there are no proper references as Magadheera is a fantasy story. Though the backdrop is Rajasthan, the references were useful for characters other than the lead protagonists. One had to imagine, match and put the costumes together for the hero and heroine."

— Rama Rajamouli on the film's styling in an interview with Rediff.com

Regarding his looks in the film, Ram Charan said, "Personality-wise there isn't much difference to Kala Bhairava but I have to tell you minor changes like the shape of my mustache, a slight voice modulation, the background scale, the atmosphere, and even the 'Chandrabindu' worked wonders on screen and gave a different look and feel and I felt like it was an altogether different side of me. When I was told of the characterization of 'Kala Bhairava', I had an impression of a young, passionate soldier and naturally, it had to have a great body and an authoritative voice. So, we also worked on it. We actually went to Rajasthan and observed the local culture and their way of dressing, we researched a lot about their costumes, history, and great personalities 400 years ago and planned it accordingly." Ram Charan sported a long hairdo for both of his characters in the film.

To design the armor used by Charan in his role as Kala Bhairava, art director R. Ravinder wanted precise measurements of Charan's body; they used plaster of Paris to make a mold of Charan's body shape from which they created a statue. They designed costumes for the statue and had Charan try them on once they were satisfied with the designs. In an interview with Radhika Rajamani of Rediff.com, the film's stylist, Rama Rajamouli, said that it took one month to develop the right look for the olden period before she began working on the materials and costumes for the film. She added that all of the film's costumes were designed by her and stitched in Hyderabad and that Kajal's costumes were heavily detailed as she needed to look rich, elegant, and bright. Rama Rajamouli had some disagreements with cinematographer K. K. Senthil Kumar over the colors of the costumes. Her decision of having Kajal wear a dress of baby pink and pista green during the war sequence at Bhairavakona was initially opposed by Rajamouli, but later agreed to after the director saw the final edit. She also used minimal jewelry for the princess' outfits.

=== Filming ===
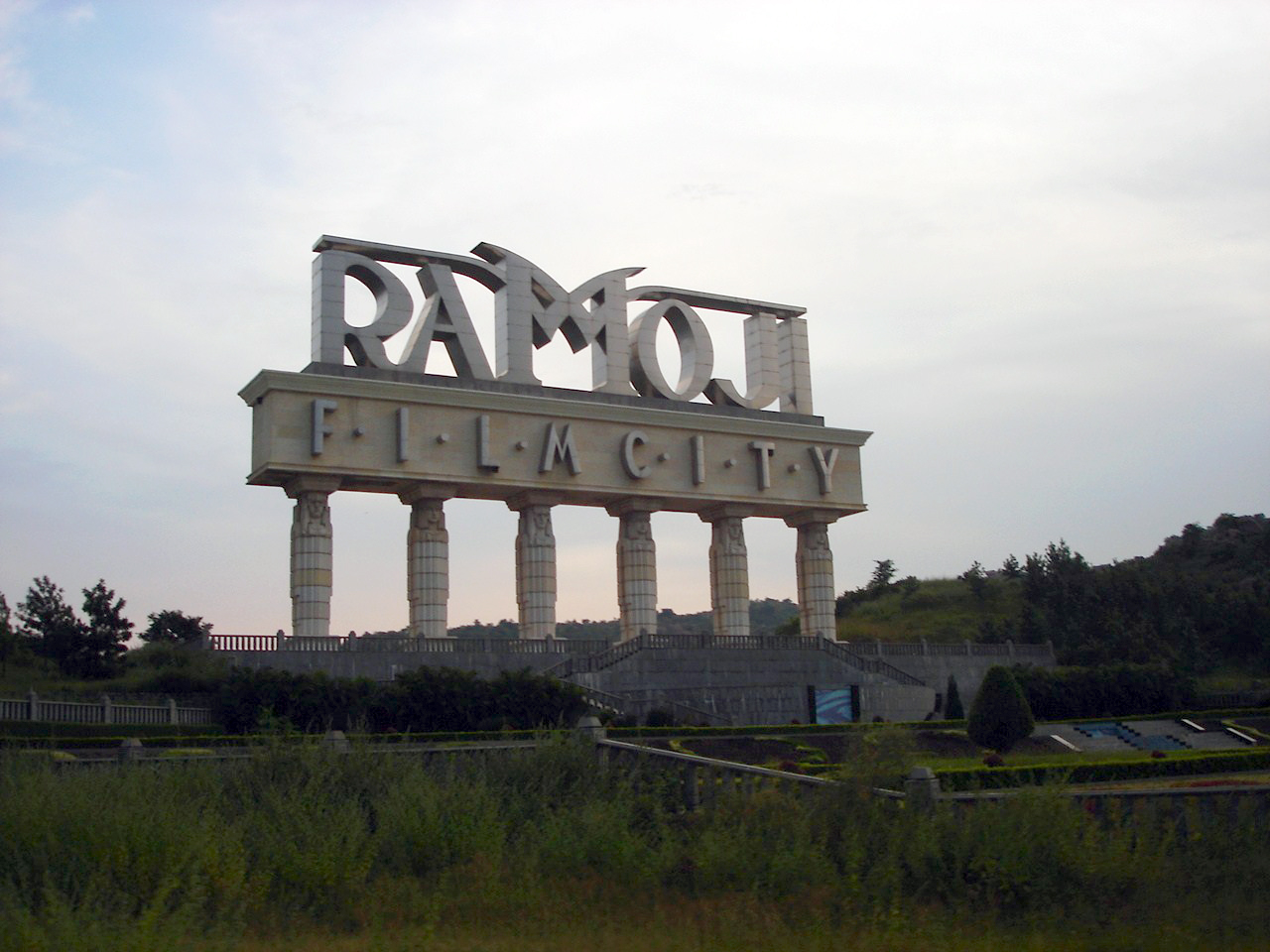
Ramoji Film City in Hyderabad where the film was shot in specially erected sets

The film's principal photography was expected to begin on 26 February 2008, and then on 15 March 2008, but finally began on 19 March 2008 in Rajasthan. Initial shooting occurred for 10 days in Rann of Kutch, Gujarat. Art director Ravinder went to Chennai and gave details of their requirements to a prominent chariot-making specialist. After rejecting the maker's first iron skeletons, Ravinder opted to design them himself, and prepared three models of chariots with different heights to be used, depending on the camera's location and other technical requirements. He used fiber material for the iron skeleton's exteriors. For a scene in which neither the hero nor the villain was present on the chariot, Ravinder measured a short person and designed a hidden chamber in which he could sit and secretly control the horses. While the chariot race sequence was shot in Dholavira, the sequence in which the chariot sinks in quicksand was shot at a set comprising three acres in Ramoji Film City.

"When we were looking for locations, we were told about Kutch. A BSF guard there told us if we go further, we would find white land. We went further and found that kind of land. We doubted whether horses and chariots could run on that land. We took pictures and came back. Then our people checked whether horses and chariots could move on it. Because of the uneven light conditions, the sand would look yellowish and with DI we could make it white. So also the sky was colored with a tinge of blue. The location helped the way it came out on screen.

— K. K. Senthil Kumar on the shoot of the film in Dholavira

K. K. Senthil Kumar scouted for locations in Gujarat, looking for dry, open lands to shoot the chariot race sequence. They found salt lands with white sands in Dholavira. To shoot the sequence there, they wanted a lightweight vehicle to follow the horses; they bought a Maruti van, removed the vehicle's top, and mounted the camera along with a jimmy jib atop it. A part of the song Dheera Dheera was also shot there, requiring filmmakers to plant a dry tree and a couple of oxen for use in the song's backdrop. An item number featuring Kim Sharma and Ram Charan was shot in late June 2008 in a specially erected fishermen colony. It was set up on the first floor of Annapurna Studios and cost less than ₹30 lakh. Ravinder explained, "The set should look like an outdoor location, but need to be constructed on an indoor floor. I constructed the exteriors of around 28 houses on that floor with a detailed interior plan for the house Srihari. I also constructed a small boat and a big-wheeled fish with a thermocouple. When the director wanted a smoke effect for a shot I held the heavy smoke machine on my shoulders at a low angle for the required effect."

After filming key parts of the film in Rajasthan, in suburbs of Hyderabad, and at Badami in Karnataka, filming continued in Ramoji Film City in a specially erected set named Bhairavakona in late October 2008. Two more schedules, one from 3–10 December and one in January, were also shot at the Bhairavakona set. The sequence of Charan killing 100 warriors, also at Bhairavakona, included a bridge. As the set did not permit shooting with low angles, a separate half-bridge was erected at Bhoot Bangla in Road No. 22 of Banjara Hills. The bridge, which had a height of 60 feet (18 m) and a length of 100 feet (30 m), was constructed on top of a rocky hill using steel beams as the skeleton and wooden material as support. It was built in around 20 days by over 60 men amid heavy rains. 20 trucks of black soil were transported from Ramoji Film City for the bridge set, as that type of soil was only available in the former location.

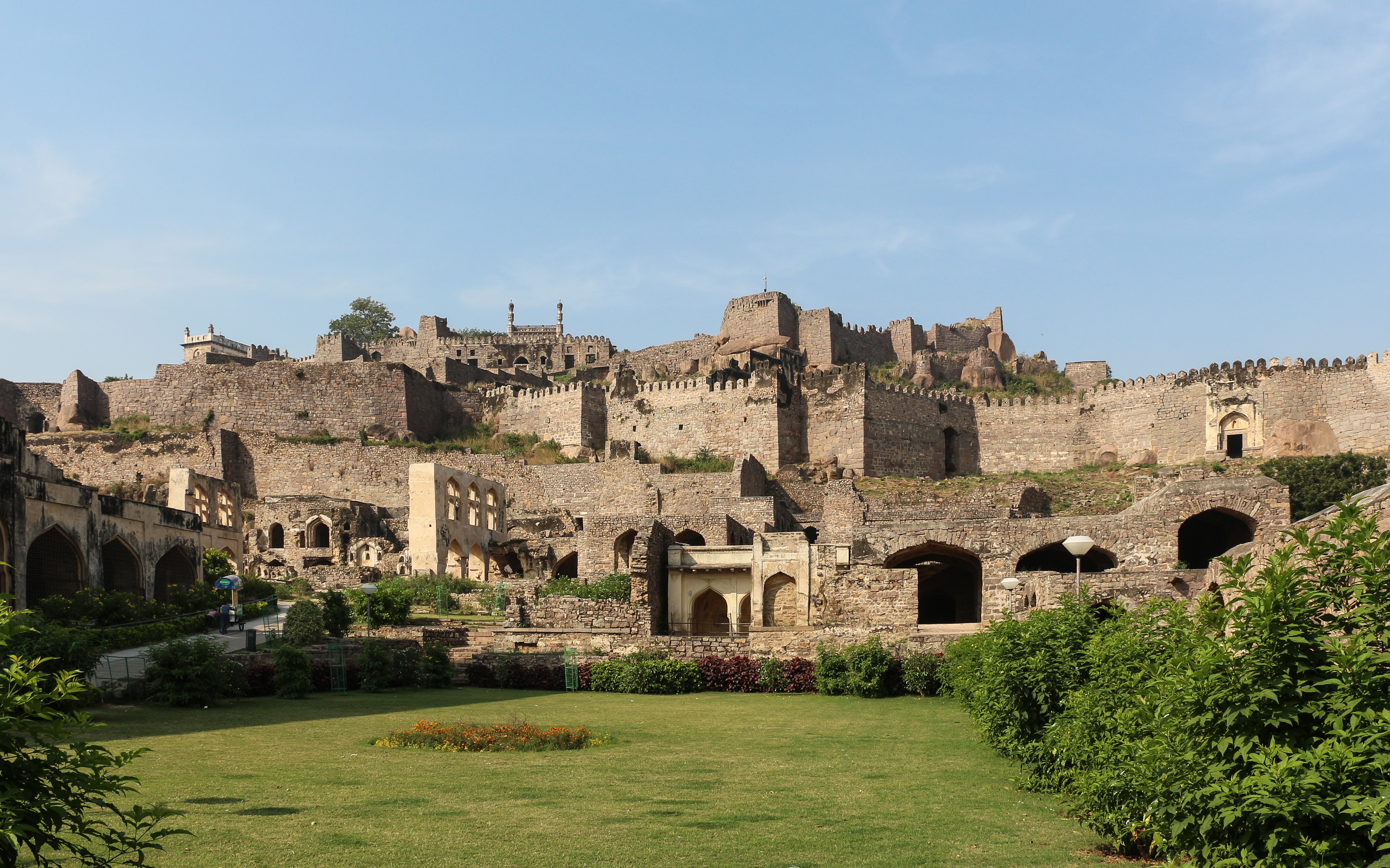
Golkonda Fort in Hyderabad where the song "Panchadara Bomma", picturized on Ram Charan and Kajal, was shot.

After the completion of shooting at the arena set in Ramoji Film City, the arena set was demolished and a set for the heroine's house was constructed in its place. This was the last set constructed for this film. By late September 2008, 70% of the film's shoot was complete. The remix version of "Bangaru Kodipetta" was shot by Ram Charan and Mumaith Khan under the supervision of Prem Rakshith at Chennai Port, although Visakhapatnam Port was first considered. Filming continued in and around Hyderabad very discreetly in November 2008. Stunt sequences by Ram Charan and some stuntmen were shot in mid-December 2008 at Hyderabad. By mid-February 2009, the film's scripted part had been wrapped up, with only some songs left to shoot. The song "Nakosam Nuvvu" was shot in Switzerland while "Panchadara Bomma Bomma" was shot at Golconda Fort in Hyderabad. Both songs were duets featuring Ram Charan and Kajal. K. K. Senthil Kumar said in an interview that Magadheera could not have been made in eight months because of its long pre-production and post-production phases. Over two lakhs worth of props, including swords, daggers, knives, bows and arrows, pouches, armor, footwear, and other accessories, were used in the film. They were designed by 160 workers, including welders, molders, carpenters, painters, cobblers, artists, tailors, and leathermen, who worked for two months in the Geetha Arts Studio. Five people were appointed exclusively to look after these props. However, during the film's shoot both Peter Hein and Ram Charan suffered major injuries. The former fell down from a height of 80–90 feet during the composition of a stunt and was advised a bed rest for four months. Charan faced severe leg fractures, while Rajamouli said that Peter "met with an accident on the sets, had two broken ribs, fractured hands and jaw and lost all his teeth. Within a month, he was back on the sets with his face and body covered in bandages and plaster. He could barely lift his hands to shoot."

=== Visual effects ===
A scene from the song "Dheera Dheera" during the filming stage (above), the same scene in the film after utilization of CGI extension (below).

R. C. Kamalakannan was the VFX producer of this film. Magadheera was the first Telugu film in which the position of "Visual Effects Producer" was used in the credits. He was assisted by a team of five experts from abroad and 62 dedicated group members, apart from 130 people from the company EFX in Chennai and Hyderabad. Visual effects and CGI were used for about 1 hour and 40 minutes out of the total 2 hours and 35 minutes in the film. 15% of the frames in the film's scenes of Udaigarh city were shot with a camera; the rest were CGI extensions. For the scenes in the stadium, CGI extension was slightly above 50%. For the stadium, Italian concept artist Marco Rolandi began with a CAD drawing and made his first 3-D concept in 5 days. It took five months for Marco Rolandi to reach the design shown in the film and as imagined by Rajamouli. Simultaneously, Iranian 3-D technical director Adel Adili, who worked with Kamalakannan for Anji (2004), Yamadonga and Arundathi (2009), was working on the 3-D Udaigarh city. He started with a city plan and added streets, buildings, mountains, temples, palaces, water bodies, a huge waterfall, rivers, gates, a moat, and trees, all of which were planned and received Rajamouli's approval before being executed to full scale. Adili redesigned Marco's 3-D stadium to suit Indian aesthetics and made it fit perfectly within the city.

Pete Draper, who worked with Kamalakanna in Ghajini (2008), was selected as the pipeline technical director of the film. At that time, Kamalakannan was in Iran finalizing the CGI stadium and City with Adili. The majority of the film was shot in anamorphic format, but a Super 35 camera gate and lens were used for the stadium episode to minimize distortion. Post-production of the stadium scenes was given to Prasad EFX, and the film set up their own render farm in Chennai. The post-process was done in several stages after the scan. The live stadium had only 7 steps, in which live people were positioned in 6 steps while the remaining 12 steps were CGI extensions. Adili created CGI people to fill the CGI steps and their actions in a library of 3000 frames.

Draper designed the birds in two flows: one flow kept flying around the stadium, while the other flow took off from a position dome and landed on a target dome. Rajamouli used those birds in several shots. Upon finishing the stages of the stadium composite, Kamalakannan flew to Iran again to work with Adel on the 3-D city shots which were created entirely in CGI. Adili designed 3-D horses for the hero and villain and Draper designed the 3-D people flocking behind the horses. About Adili's work, Kamalakannan said, "When we started the city-shot renders, it has taken several hours to render one frame. But Adili re-corrected the geometry and applied several path-breaking ideas, so even on 24 July, just a week before the film release, we were able to do corrections, render and submit." ₹4 crores ($825,000) was spent solely on VFX for Magadheera.

=== Piracy ===
During the film's shoot at Ramoji Film City in late November 2008, a 500 square feet (46 m^{2}) film can, containing two or three scenes, was discovered missing from Rainbow lab. The filmmakers filed a case at Hayathnagar police station. Security personnel and film unit members searched, but failed to recover the reels. Rajamouli's unit said it was not important if the scenes from the can were aired online since they were not crucial scenes, were all on a blue matte, and lacked finishing. Later, raw footage from the film was seen on the internet but no details about the culprits were found. After the photographs and small video clips were leaked on the Internet, some of the film unit members felt that the loss might have been a ploy on the part of the producers to create hype.

== Themes and influences ==
The film is based on the concept of reincarnation and eternal love. According to Rediff, the rewritten script's basic storyline is that "Love remains eternal and it will follow generations and generations. There is always a big victory for Love." The film's flashback sequences were used as a flip switch between the film's olden and present-day eras. Initially the film featured a scene in which the present-day heroine accidentally receives a dupatta preserved in a museum that is used in the flashbacks as the dupatta Bhairava and Ranadheer race. However, separate dupattas were used in the film as Rajamouli felt that getting the dupatta from the flashback would complicate the narrative.

In her book Bimal Roy's Madhumati: Untold Stories from Behind the Scenes, writer Rinki Bhattacharya compared the reincarnation theme of Magadheera with that of Madhumati (1958), Karz (1980), Karan Arjun (1995) and Om Shanti Om (2007). Touching the heroine unleashes locked memories within the hero that transport him to Rajasthan in 1609 from contemporary Hyderabad. Bhattacharya also compared Magadheera to another Telugu film, Mooga Manasulu (1964). Rajamouli told Subhash K. Jha that he was inspired by Karan Arjun to make films based on reincarnation. Similarities have been noticed with the core plot elements of the 1976 Kannada movie Raja Nanna Raja.

== Music ==
M. M. Keeravani composed the film's soundtrack. Kalyani Malik had done the Sound supervision. It features six songs including the remixed version of his composition "Bangaru Kodipetta" from the 1992 film Gharana Mogudu. The soundtrack of the Tamil dubbed version, Maaveeran, had three additional tracks. The Telugu soundtrack was launched at Shilpakala Vedika in Hyderabad on 28 June 2009. The Tamil version was launched on 25 April 2011 in Chennai.

== Release ==
=== Theatrical ===
Geetha Arts released the film on 31 July 2009, with 625 digital UFO Moviez prints in 1250 theatres across the globe, making Magadheera the biggest release for a Telugu film in history. Its release included more than 1000 screens in Andhra Pradesh alone. The film opened up with 25 prints overseas in almost 40 locations. Magadheera was the first Telugu film to be released on 21 screens in North America. Huge vinyl posters featuring Ram Charan and his father, cameo performer Chiranjeevi, were put up at all of the theatres in Krishna District. Posters also featured the head of Chiranjeevi's political party, former MLA Vangaveeti Radhakrishna, which added political importance to the release.

Tamil and Malayalam dubbed versions were planned in mid-February 2009. The film's Tamil dubbed version was titled as Maaveeran, named after the 1986 Tamil film. Geetha Arts collaborated with Udhayanidhi Stalin for the Tamil version and distributed it under his production banner, Red Giant Movies. K. Bhagyaraj wrote the dialogues for Maaveeran. The Malayalam version was titled Dheera—The Warrior and was distributed by Pallavi films. The Tamil dubbed version Maaveeran and Malayalam dubbed version Dheera—The Warrior were released in more than 100 screens and 50 screens respectively on 27 May 2011.

=== Distribution ===
Raju Hirwani, the owner of Supreme Music, ventured into overseas distribution with Magadheera. He distributed the film in the USA via Blue Sky Cinemas Inc. The distribution rights of non-US countries, including the UK, Ireland, Middle East, Australia, New Zealand and Singapore, were acquired by Krishna Productions. The theatrical rights of Australia and New Zealand were sold to Tollyfilmz. The film's Singaporean rights were sold to Pragati Films. Gulf and Kuwait theatrical rights were sold to K. A. Chowdary and Basheer respectively. Red Giant Movies distributed Maaveeran while Pallavi films distributed Dheera—The Warrior. The film's Karnataka distributor, Vijayakumar, was disciplined for breaking the rules of the Karnataka Film Chamber of Commerce by simultaneously releasing a non-Kannada film in more than 21 screens in the state. The proceeds of 21 screens were given to him while the rest was confiscated by the Chamber of Commerce. The KFCC also suspended Vijaykumar, who was KFCC's secretary for distribution, from its executive committee.

Joint collector Gaurav Uppal convened a meeting of film exhibitors and distributors, warning them against black-marketing tickets to Magadheera. This was after local leaders, attempting to acquire a maximum number of tickets, blocked and booked tickets to the film in advance, to enthuse their supporters during the local civic polls in Guntur. Special teams of revenue, police, and commercial tax officers were appointed to keep watch at ticket counters and ensure that each person was issued only one ticket. Priority was ordered to be given to the sanitation, safety, and comfort of the viewers. Authorities in Vijayawada ensured the strict checking and prevention of black-marketing of tickets. However, Ram Charan's fans resorted to sloganeering and an impromptu protest demonstration in the office of Revenue Divisional Officer K. Hymavathi in Machilipatnam. They demanded the screening of a benefit show and the advance sale of tickets after being rejected by the management of the twin theatres, Siri Venkata and Siri Krishna, where the film was screened. The officer rejected their plea and said that the tickets would be issued only to those who came in the queue and that no special concessions would be made for fans.

=== Mishaps ===
On 9 August 2009, two persons, identified as NIT student M. Praveen Kumar and Ganesh, were killed and 15 others sustained severe injuries after being electrocuted while jostling for tickets for Magadheera at the theatre Bhavani in Kazipet, Warangal. The screening of Magadheera at theatres in Vizianagaram was prohibited by the then minister Botsa Satyanarayana until safety measures were complied with. Satyanarayana's announcement followed the death of five people in Salur Village due to an electrical accident at the Lakshmi theatre screening Magadheera.

=== Accusation of plagiarism ===
Folk lyricist Vangapandu Prasada Rao alleged that his 40-year-old folk song "Em Pillado Eldamostavaa", which was featured in T. Krishna's Ardharathri Swatanthram (1986), was used by film director Rajamouli and Allu Aravind in the Magadheera song "Jorsey" without Rao's consent. Activists of PDSU, POW and PYL staged a protest demonstration in front of the Ashok 70 MM theatre in Nizamabad, where the film was screened, to demand the removal of the song. The protesters said that the song was written by Rao during the famous Srikakulam armed struggle four decades prior and had been misused to portray an obscene duet in the film. They added that the song was used without the permission of the writer and that the depiction defeated the very purpose of the song, which was written in a revolutionary spirit. They demanded a public apology by the makers to Rao. A few reports stated that Rao demanded Aravind pay him compensation of ₹50 lacks.

After the completion of the film's 175-day run, novelist S. P. Chary accused the film of being based on a novel that he had written and published as a serial under the title Chanderi in a monthly magazine in 1998. He demanded that filmmakers compensate him for using his idea without consent, and threatened to take legal action if the producers did not heed his demands, or remade the film in another language. He added that he deserved to be credited for the story and alleged that Allu Arjun and Allu Sirish were trying to postpone his acknowledgment by discussing the issue with him.

=== Home media ===
Magadheera was the first Telugu film in India to have a home media release in the Blu-ray format. During the release announcement, Allu Sirish said that although they initially were reluctant to go for it, given the fact that there were approximately only 2500 Blu-ray devices in Andhra Pradesh, the overwhelming demand for it made him rethink the decision. He added, "Sharing this vision with us was Sri Balaji Videos, the largest home-video label in Andhra Pradesh. Together, we're bringing out Magadheera on Blu-ray. Though Bhavani Videos released Nagarjuna's King (2008) on Blu-ray, it was only for the overseas market. This makes Magadheera the first Blu-ray film to be released in India and with a bonus disc with additional footage. We're also holding a press event in this regard to officially announce the launch of the movie on DVD and Blu-ray."

A press note announced that the DVDs would be available beginning the third week of March 2010 while the Blu-ray would be available two weeks later. The launch ceremony took place in a Marriott Hotel on 27 February 2010. The first DVD was released by M. M. Keeravani and was presented by journalist Pasupuleti Ramarao. The DVD was released in NTSC video format and Dolby Digital 5.1 surround audio format on 5 March 2010. The Blu-ray disc was released on 13 April 2010. Magadheera held the top position in sales for its 720p Blu-ray edition with 5.1 Dolby digital sound format as of July 2014.

== Reception ==
=== Critical response ===
Suresh Krishnamoorthy of The Hindu summarised, "Magadheera is not for the weak-hearted, those who do not like the sight of blood and neither is it for those who like movies with storylines that are much-closer-to-everyday- reality. But Rajamouli excels in story-telling. The way he has used the flashback as a flip switch, going back and forth and taking the viewer through a 400-year journey in a jiffy is interesting. The rest is about how well technology, creativity, imagination, and innovation are leveraged to present what is an eye-pleasing experience for viewers." B. V. S. Prakash of The Times of India wrote, "Despite a few narrative lapses, the much-hyped semi-periodic epic lives up to expectations. Unlike his previous action-centric films, director Rajamouli dishes a heart-touching love story on a lavish canvas convincingly. Also kudos for the way he has visualized and presented the film." He added, "After not-so-impressive Chirutha, Ram Charan Tej returns as a valiant soldier and breathes life into the larger-than-life role with ease. Similarly, Kajal known for simple lover-girl roles transforms into a determined princess and truly impresses. Dev Gil is adequate as the ruthless villain", and rated the film 3 out of 5.

Radhika Rajamani of Rediff.com called the film "technically brilliant" and wrote "A reincarnation story is not often seen in Telugu cinema and SS Rajamouli uses this theme for Ram Charan Teja's second film Magadheera. It's a magnum opus production with great technical work. The graphics are excellent for a Telugu movie. Overall, the movie is a mainstream one with good packaging." She rated the film 3 out of 5. Sify called the film a "brilliant entertainer" and wrote, "Set against the backdrop of an eerie theme — reincarnation — Magadheera unfolds on the screen with multiple shades of entertainment. When the movie was launched last year, director Rajamouli dared to reveal the central theme of the story. He succeeded in his attempt, as he was able to keep the screenplay and narration gripping from start to finish. The second half has the soul in it." Sify summarised, "In short, the movie encompasses some of the best commercial elements that Telugu audiences have seen in the recent past."

However, Rajamouli was accused of lifting scenes from films like Gladiator (2000), Troy (2004), The Myth (2005) and 300 (2007).

=== Box office ===
Magadheera collected distributors' share of ₹78 crore and grossing ₹140 crore during its theatrical run, and emerged as the highest-grossing Telugu film in history at the time.

The film collected a share of approximately ₹19.87 crore ($4 million) in its first week in Andhra Pradesh alone, of which a share of ₹7.1 crore ($1.46 million) was collected in Nizam region. Sixteen centres collected ₹1 crore ($206,000), each of which was an all-time state record. It collected a share of ₹38.15 crores ($7.88 million) in 21 days in Andhra Pradesh. By the end of its four-week run, the film was declared a blockbuster and collected a share of ₹43.56 crores ($9 million) in 28 days and ₹47.08 crores ($9.7 million) in 35 days. The film completed a 50-day run in 302 centers on 18 September 2009. By then, the film had collected ₹65 crores ($13.4 million) share and stood strong. It became the first Telugu film to enter the 100 crore club.

The film completed its 100-day run in 223 centers. By then it had surpassed Rajinikanth's Sivaji: The Boss (2007), which grossed ₹70 crore in Tamil Nadu, and stood second to Ghajini (2008), which reached ₹200 crore. The film completed a 175-day run in three centers. The film completed a 365-day run in Vijayalakshmi theatre in Kurnool on 31 July 2010 and a 1000-day run in the same theatre on 26 April 2012. Its 1000-day theatrical run surpassed Chandramukhi (2005) as the longest-running South Indian film.

More than 50% of the film's lifetime collections were from the Nizam region. The film also did well in the overseas box office. It was released in New Jersey with three prints on three screens and collected a record share of more than 150,000 dollars, turning the highest amount raised overseas by a Telugu film; the previous record holder was Trivikram Srinivas' Jalsa (2008), which collected more than 100,000 dollars. It grossed 102,000 dollars in its first two days in New Jersey and a share of 95,000 dollars in Virginia with two prints as of mid-August 2009. It collected a share of 78,000 dollars in the San Francisco Bay Area with a single print. It managed to sell 2300 tickets in Minneapolis; the previous record for tickets sold there for a Telugu film was 1200. The film's overseas records were beaten two years later by Dookudu (2011), although disputes have arisen over which film holds the Tollywood all-time sales record.

The film was dubbed in Japanese and released there in 2018. This version earned an additional $1 million, the second highest for an Indian film after Muthu (1995), which earned $1.6 million after being released in Japan.

== Legacy ==
Magadheera's success turned Kajal into one of the most sought-after actresses in Telugu cinema and catapulted her into the foray of leading Telugu actresses. The film was also considered a fate changer in the career of Ram Charan. The role of Sher Khan played by Srihari was considered as one of the best roles in his career and also catapulted S. S. Rajamouli to stardom. Dev Gill attained stardom with this film and went on to work in several South Indian films as an antagonist. After the release of Magadheera, people began recognizing him as Ranadheer. According to writer Gopimohan, Magadheera started a trend of experimentation with a period, socio-fantasy and spiritual themes that were continued in films like Panchakshari (2010), Nagavalli (2010), Anaganaga O Dheerudu (2011), Mangala (2011), Sri Rama Rajyam (2011) and Uu Kodathara? Ulikki Padathara? (2012).

The props used in this film, including weapons like swords and shields, were auctioned by Movie Artists Association. Actors, technicians, and the general public were invited to bid and the proceeds were used to aid poor artists in the Telugu film industry. Actor Sivaji Raja started the bidding by offering ₹50,000 for the sword that Ram Charan used and comedian Venu Madhav started the bidding for the shield with ₹25,000. B. V. S. N. Prasad bid for both the sword and knife for ₹100,000. The bidding started on 7 May 2010 online on the association's official website and ended on 16 May. The winners were declared on 20 May 2010. After Magadheera, S. S. Rajamouli worked on a small budget film Maryada Ramanna (2010) which, according to Crazy Mohan, was similar to the act of S. S. Vasan directing the small budget film Mr. Sampat (1952) after Chandralekha (1948). Rajamouli explained his decision by saying, "I decided that my next project would be Maryada Ramanna during the Magadheera shooting itself because it is a one and half year project that demands a lot of physical labour and mental strain. I didn't want to commit to another physically exhausting film immediately after Magadheera. Maryada Ramanna gave us time to recharge our batteries so that we could come up with another huge project." He revealed Maryada Ramanna's plot before its launch to minimize the expectations of his audience after Magadheera's success.

Tammareddy Bharadwaja said "Ever since Arundhati and Magadheera did well at the box office, the rest of the industry started following their footsteps. Also, since there is an irrational craze to make high-budget films right now, producers are turning towards mythological films. It is the only genre where you can boast of spending crores for creating the sets and the look of the film. But what they don't realize is that if these films flop, the blow to the producer will be severe." Films like Anaganaga O Dheerudu (2011) and Sakthi (2011) were commercial failures and Badrinath (2012) was an average grosser; all being fantasy films in which the protagonist is a warrior. The promos of Badrinath looked similar to Magadheera and the former's director V. V. Vinayak along with its male lead Allu Arjun kept insisting that Badrinath is dissimilar to Magadheera. Producer Natti Kumar said "If a hero delivers a hit, producers run after him for five years and burn their fingers only after six or eight flops. It's the same story with movies. Since Magadheera became a hit, every other hero and director wants to do a period film where there is scope to spend crores. They don't work on the script, story, or relevance. It is a pure display of graphics, heroes' abs, and grandeur. The plot is lost. Magadheera worked because it was a novel genre then, but why will people want to see the same things again?"

Matt Groening, the creator of the television series The Simpsons and Futurama while discussing his inspiration for Disenchantment said, "In a given show there might be homages to Buster Keaton and to an Indian filmmaker named S. S. Rajamouli, who has made some of my favorite films of the last decade. I particularly recommend a movie called Magadheera. I'm getting very obscure now. But this stuff just makes me so happy."

Janani Iyer cited the character of Mithravinda played by Kajal in the film as one of her dream roles. Ram Gopal Varma refused to call Magadheera a film and instead termed it as an event that comes "once in a blue moon". While commenting on Mahesh Babu's Aagadu (2014), he said that Magadheera looked like a 750 crore film when compared to Aagadu if the latter was a 75 crore film and added, "My comparison between "Aagadu" and "Magadheera" is mainly because they both are the most expensive films for their own individual times." Reviewing the Tamil film Anegan (2014), few critics opined that the film had traces of Magadheera mainly due to the theme of reincarnation. The Tamil dubbed version of the Telugu film Yevadu (2014), which featured Charan in one of the lead roles and Kajal in a crucial cameo, was titled Magadheera.

The film was dubbed into Tamil as Maaveeran and into Malayalam as Dheera: The Warrior and was released on 27 May 2011. Both the dubbed versions were big hits and earned a good fan base for Ram Charan in Tamil Nadu and Kerala. In 2016, it was featured at the Fantastic Fest.

== Accolades ==
The film won the National Award for Best Choreography and Best Special Effects at the 57th National Film Awards. The film also won six Filmfare Awards, nine Nandi Awards, and ten CineMAA Awards.

== Remakes ==
Charan decided not to debut in Hindi film with Magadheera's Hindi language remake, as he believed the film might not be recreated well. In an interview with The Times of India, Charan said, "When I met Anil Kapoor some time back, he told me I will ask Boney Kapoor to remake Magadheera with you in Hindi. But I said I don't know if I would want to do the remake. Magadheera is a lovely film which can't be recreated." The film was remade in Bengali as Yoddha: The Warrior in 2014; it was directed by Raj Chakraborty with Dev and Mimi Chakraborty playing the lead roles. The 2014 Kannada film Brahma, according to its director R. Chandru, was on the lines of Magadheera but was not a remake. The film was dubbed in Hindi under the same name by Goldmines Telefilms and released in 2015.
