= University Ground =

University Ground may refer to:

- Tribhuvan University International Cricket Ground, Nepal
- Jadavpur University Ground, Jadavpur University, Salt Lake campus, West Bengal, India – multi-purpose ground mainly used for cricket and football
- Jamia Millia Islamia University Ground, Okhla, New Delhi, India – cricket ground used for women’s ODIs and Tests
- Lucknow University Ground, Lucknow, Uttar Pradesh, India – a former Test cricket stadium
- Sri Venkateswara University Ground, Tirupati, Andhra Pradesh, India – a multi-purpose stadium hosting domestic cricket matches
- Gangotri Glades Stadium, University of Mysore, Mysuru, Karnataka, India – a multi-purpose cricket stadium
- University Ground, Barnwell, Cambridge University, England — no longer in existence

== See also ==
- University Stadium (disambiguation)
