= Makuta VFX =

Indian visual effects and animation company

- Type: Private
- Industry: Visual Effects, CGI animation, Entertainment
- Founded: Hyderabad, India in 2010
- Founders: Adel Adili; Pete Draper; R. C. Kamalakannan
- Headquarters: Santa Clara, California
- Key people: Dasaradha Gude; Raja Koduri; Adel Adili; Pete Draper
- Parent: Makuta Inc.
- Website: http://www.makutavfx.com

Makuta is an Indian visual effects and animation company based in Santa Clara, CA with branches in Hyderabad, India and Universal City, CA. The company received the prestigious National Film Award for Best Special Effects, from the Indian government, in 2010 and 2012, for Magadheera and Eega, respectively.

== History ==
The company was founded by Pete Draper, Adel Adili, and R. C. Kamalakannan in 2010, off the success of their collaboration on Magadheera (2009), the trio brought in private investment and technical advisors from the entertainment and technology industries to their board of directors, such as Dasaradha Gude, Raja Koduri, and S. S. Rajamouli, along with long-time collaborator, A. V. Dorababu as studio lead. As per an agreement, Rajamouli exited from the board of directors after two calendar years, during the production of Eega and Kamalakannan personally exited in 2012. Draper, Adili, and Dorababu have been spearheading the studio's operations since.

== Work ==
It is a fully-fledged visual effects facility covering a full gamut of requirements from active on-set visual effects supervision through to immersive digital set extension, digital matte painting, high-end feature animation and effects work, clean-up, motion tracking and final compositing. Makuta branched into LiDAR Scanning in 2013 and was the first visual effects studio in India to start offering this service with the use of Faro LiDAR scanning hardware. The studio has championed creative education in the country with its senior members providing student workshops and parental guidance.

The company provided visual effects to some of the biggest blockbusters from Indian cinema, such as Baahubali: The Beginning, Baahubali 2: The Conclusion, 2.0, Saaho, Sye Raa Narasimha Reddy, and RRR.

== Filmography ==
* Denotes yet to be released

Year	Film	Production House	Language
2008	Ghajini	Geetha Arts	Hindi
2009	Magadheera	Geetha Arts	Telugu
2010	Maryada Ramanna	Arka Media Works	Telugu
2010	Enthiran	Sun Pictures	Tamil
2011	7 Aum Arivu	Red Giant Movies	Tamil
2011	Badrinath	Geetha Arts	Telugu
2011	Sri Rama Rajyam	Sri Sai Baba Movies	Telugu
2012	Eega	Varahi Chalana Chitram	Telugu/Tamil
2014	1: Nenokkadine	14 Reels Entertainment	Telugu
2014	Hunting the Phantom	MG Production	English
2014	Manam	Annapurna Studios	Telugu
2014	Aagadu	14 Reels Entertainment	Telugu
2014	Yamaleela 2	Krishvi Films	Telugu
2015	Gopala Gopala	Suresh Productions	Telugu
2015	I	Aascar Film	Tamil
2015	Baahubali: The Beginning	Arka Media Works	Telugu/Tamil
2016	Brahmotsavam	PVP Cinema	Telugu
2016	Nannaku Prematho	Sri Venkateswara Cine Chitra	Telugu
2016	Nagarahavu	Pen Movies	Kannada
2016	Theri	V. Creations	Tamil
2017	Legion	Marvel Television	English
2017	Baahubali: The Conclusion	Arka Media Works	Telugu/Tamil
2017	Spyder	NVR Cinema	Telugu/Tamil
2018	Genghis Khan	Soovi	Chinese
2018	Rangasthalam	Mythri Movie Makers	Telugu
2018	Naa Peru Surya	Ramalakshmi Cine Creations	Telugu
2018	Kaala	Wunderbar Films	Tamil
2018	Savyasachi	Mythri Movie Makers	Telugu
2018	Saakshyam	Abhishek Pictures	Telugu
2018	Taxiwaala	UV Creations	Telugu
2018	Thugs of Hindostan	Yash Raj Films	Hindi
2018	2.0	Lyca Productions	Tamil
2018	Zero	Red Chillies Entertainment	Hindi
2019	Saaho	UV Creations	Telugu/Hindi
2019	Sye Raa Narasimha Reddy	Konidela Production Company	Telugu
2019	Mamangam	Kavya Film Company	Malayalam
2021	Pushpa: The Rise	Mythri Movie Makers	Telugu
2022	RRR	DVV Entertainments	Telugu
2022	Radhe Shyam	UV Creations	Telugu/Hindi
2022	Sita Ramam	Vyjayanthi Movies	Telugu
2022	Cobra	7 Screen Studio	Tamil
2022	Godfather	Konidela Production Company	Telugu
2023	Varisu	7 Screen Studio	Tamil
2023	Shaakuntalam	Gunaa Teamworks	Telugu
2023	Agent	AK Entertainments	Telugu
2023	Ponniyin Selvan: II	Lyca Productions	Tamil
2023	Leo	7 Screen Studio	Tamil
2023	Jawan	Red Chillies Entertainment	Hindi
2023	Ahimsa	Anandi Art Creations	Telugu
2023	Mujib: The Making of a Nation	BFDC and NFDC	Bengali
2024	Pushpa: The Rule	Mythri Movie Makers	Telugu
2025	Coolie	Sun Pictures	Tamil
2025	Baahubali: The Epic	Arka Media Works	Telugu

== Awards ==
Ceremony	Film	Nomiee	Result
63rd National Film Awards	Baahubali	Best Special Effects	Won
60th National Film Awards	Eega	Best Special Effects	Won
CineMAA Awards	Eega	Best Visual Effects	Won
60th Filmfare Awards	Eega	Best Visual Effects	Won
57th National Film Awards	Magadheera	Best Visual Effects	Won
