= Raja Koduri =

Computer engineer

- Born: Rajabali Makaradhwaja Koduri; 31 August 1968 (age 57); Kovvur, Andhra Pradesh, India
- Citizenship: United States
- Education: IIT Kharagpur, Kharagpur, West Bengal; Andhra University, Visakhapatnam
- Occupation: Business executive
- Relatives: M. M. Keeravani (cousin); Kalyani Malik (cousin); M. M. Srilekha (cousin); S. S. Rajamouli (cousin); V. Vijayendra Prasad (uncle)

Rajabali Makaradhwaja Koduri (born 31 August 1968) is an Indian computer engineer and executive for computer graphics hardware. He was the chief architect and Executive Vice President of Intel's architecture, graphics and software (IAGS) division until April 2023. Before Intel, he worked as the senior vice president and chief architect of the Radeon Technologies Group, the graphics division at Intel's competitor AMD.

== Early life ==
Raja Koduri was born to a Telugu family in Kovvur, West Godavari district of Andhra Pradesh, India. Noted film director S. S. Rajamouli is his cousin. Other members of his extended family also work in the film industry as writers, music composers and singers.

He earned a bachelor's degree in electronics and communications from Andhra University, Visakhapatnam. He holds a Master of Technology degree from IIT Kharagpur, Kharagpur, West Bengal.

== Career ==
Raja Koduri joined S3 Graphics in 1996. He became the director of advanced technology development at ATI Technologies in 2001. Following Advanced Micro Devices's 2006 acquisition of ATI, he served as chief technology officer for graphics at AMD until 2009. At S3 and ATI he made key contributions to several generations of GPU architectures that evolved from DirectX Ver 3 till Ver 11. He then went to Apple Inc., where he worked with graphics hardware, which allowed Apple to transition to high-resolution Retina displays for its Mac computers. He returned to AMD in 2013 as a vice president in Visual Computing, which includes both GPU hardware and software, unlike his pre-2009 role at AMD which only concerned GPU hardware. AMD reorganized its graphics division in 2015, promoting Koduri to the executive level by naming him senior vice president and chief architect of the newly formed Radeon Technologies Group. Under this role, Koduri reported directly to AMD CEO Lisa Su. Raja lead the architecture transformation of Radeon Technology Group with Polaris, Vega and Navi architectures that made their way into several PC, Mac and Game Consoles (Microsoft Xbox and Sony PlayStation).

In September 2017, Koduri revealed via an internal letter to the Radeon Technologies Group (RTG) that he would be taking a sabbatical beginning on September 25, in order to spend time with his family. He mentioned specifically in his letter that the Vega architecture development cycle was difficult for him (and thus a factor in prompting the leave) and that AMD CEO Lisa Su would act as leader of RTG in his absence. Though Koduri stated that he planned to return in December, he announced on November 7, 2017, via another internal company letter, that he would be resigning from AMD. The following day, Intel announced that Koduri had been appointed chief architect and senior vice president of the newly conceived Core and Visual Computing Group, with an emphasis on developing high-end discrete GPUs for the company, in addition to expanding "Intel's leading position in integrated graphics for the PC market." Koduri's work with Intel came to fruition in August 2021, with the announcement of Intel's upcoming Arc series of consumer GPUs. The first of these GPUs, codenamed "Alchemist," was expected to launch in Q1 2022 and is intended to compete directly with graphics-processing hardware offerings from AMD and Nvidia.

Koduri is an investor and advisor at Makuta VFX, an Indian Visual effects company that had an impact on raising the visual effects quality in Indian cinema with award-winning and successful films like Eega, Baahubali series.

In March 2023, he announced that he would leave Intel's graphics division at the end of the month, in favor of an AI-focused software startup, currently called Oxmiq Labs.

== Personal life ==
He currently lives in San Francisco.
