= Eega =

2012 Indian bilingual fantasy action film by S. S. Rajamouli

- Theatrical release poster in Telugu
- Directed by: S. S. Rajamouli
- Written by: S. S. Rajamouli
- Dialogues by: Janardhana Maharshi; (Telugu); Crazy Mohan; (Tamil)
- Concept by: V. Vijayendra Prasad
- Produced by: Sai Korrapati
- Starring: Nani; Sudeepa; Samantha
- Cinematography: K. K. Senthil Kumar
- Visual effects by: Adel Adili; Pete Draper; R. C. Kamalakannan
- Edited by: Kotagiri Venkateswara Rao
- Music by: M. M. Keeravani
- Production company: Vaaraahi Chalana Chitram
- Distributed by: 14 Reels Entertainment; PVP Cinema; Reliance Entertainment
- Release date: 6 July 2012
- Running time: 134 minutes
- Country: India
- Languages: Telugu; Tamil
- Budget: ₹26–40 crore (Note: The New Indian Express quoted Nani estimating the film's budget as ₹26 crore, S. S. Rajamouli mentioned the film's budget to be around ₹30 crore on one occasion and as ₹30–35 crore in another interview, and Rajeev Kamineni of PVP Cinema estimated the film's budget as ₹40 crore in an interview with The Times of India.)
- Box office: est.₹125–130 crore (Note: The Economic Times estimates the final gross figure as ₹125 crore, while Deccan Herald estimates the final gross figure to be nearly ₹130 crore.)

Eega (transl. Fly) is a 2012 Indian Telugu-language fantasy action film written and directed by S. S. Rajamouli. The film was produced by Sai Korrapati under Vaaraahi Chalana Chitram. (Note: The average exchange rate in 2011 was 51.10 Indian rupees (₹) per 1 US dollar (US$).) (Note: The average exchange rate in 2012 was 54.47 Indian rupees (₹) per 1 US dollar (US$).) It was filmed simultaneously in Tamil with the title Naan Ee (transl. I, the Fly). The film stars Nani, Sudeepa and Samantha. M. M. Keeravani composed the songs and the background score, while K. K. Senthil Kumar was the director of photography. Janardhana Maharshi and Crazy Mohan wrote the dialogue for the Telugu and Tamil versions, respectively.

The film follows a bedtime story narrated by a father to his daughter. Nani, who is in love with his neighbour Bindu, is murdered by a wealthy industrialist Sudeep, who is attracted to Bindu and considers Nani a rival. Nani reincarnates as a housefly and tries to avenge his death and protect Bindu from an obsessive Sudeep.

The idea for the film originated in the mid-1990s from a conversation in which Rajamouli's father and screenwriter V. Vijayendra Prasad joked with Rajamouli about the idea of a fly seeking revenge against a human. Rajamouli reconsidered the idea after finishing Maryada Ramanna (2010), and developed it into a script. The film's production began on 7 December 2010 at Ramanaidu Studios in Hyderabad. Principal photography began on 22 February 2011 and continued until late February 2012. Makuta VFX and Annapurna Studios oversaw Eega's visual effects and digital intermediate process, respectively.

The two versions of the film, alongside a Malayalam-dubbed version titled Eecha, were released on 6 July 2012 on approximately 1,100 screens globally. The performances of the cast, particularly Sudeepa, Nani, and Samantha, along with Rajamouli's direction and the visual effects, received wide critical acclaim upon release. Eega was one of the highest-grossing Telugu films of the year, earning over ₹125 crore on an estimated budget of ₹26–40 crore. Eega won two National Film Awards (Best Feature Film in Telugu and Best Special Effects), five South Filmfare Awards including Best Telugu Film, Best Telugu Director, Best Telugu Actress (Samantha) and Best Telugu Supporting Actor (Sudeepa) and three South Indian International Movie Awards. The film won nine awards, including Most Original Film at the Toronto After Dark Film Festival. Eega was listed among "The 25 Best Foreign Films of the Decade" by The Ringer.

== Plot ==
Nani is a lighthearted young man who specializes in manufacturing fireworks. He is deeply in love with his neighbor, Bindu, a talented miniature artist who runs a Non-governmental organization (NGO). Although Bindu secretly reciprocates his feelings, she chooses to conceal them. Seeking corporate funding for her NGO, Bindu visits the office of Sudeep, a wealthy, powerful, and highly narcissistic industrialist. Attracted to Bindu, Sudeep donates ₹15 lakh to her organization to win her favor. However, his subsequent romantic overtures fail because Bindu remains completely oblivious to his intentions. Upon observing Nani and Bindu interacting on the street, Sudeep recognizes their mutual attraction and perceives Nani as a romantic rival.

One evening, after Nani helps Bindu finish a intricate piece of micro-art—a heart locket carved from a pencil lead—Sudeep abducts Nani on his way home. Sudeep strangles him to death, staging the murder as a random vehicular accident. Before dying, Nani vows to seek retribution if Sudeep ever harms Bindu. Unaware of the crime, Bindu confesses her love to Nani over the phone just as he expires. Sudeep leaves the scene undetected, and Nani is immediately reincarnated as a common housefly with no initial memories of his past life.

As a fly, Nani gradually recovers his memories after cross-referencing encounters with both Sudeep and Bindu. He dedicates himself to protecting Bindu and terrorizing Sudeep. When Sudeep invites a grieving Bindu to New Delhi to present her NGO to an education minister for national recognition, Nani causes Sudeep to suffer a sudden car crash on the way to the airport. The fly then scratches the words "I will kill you" onto the shattered windshield, inducing severe paranoia in Sudeep. Later, Nani observes Bindu mourning in her bedroom and reveals his identity by spelling out his name on her desk using her tears. After he communicates the true nature of his murder, Bindu agrees to ally with him. Nani systematically sabotages Sudeep's personal and professional operations, eventually orchestrating a localized fire that burns Sudeep's hidden black money to ashes, leaving him financially ruined.

Sudeep consults a tantric sorcerer, who performs a ritual and reveals that the tormenting housefly is the reincarnation of Nani. Terrified but determined, Sudeep attempts to trap and kill Nani at his residence. The fly eludes the trap, triggering an electrical short circuit that ignites a massive house fire. The tantric priest is killed in the chaos, and Sudeep is left unconscious from smoke inhalation. Nani and Bindu assume Sudeep perished, but he is rescued by his business partner, Adithya. Upon awakening, Sudeep discovers Bindu's complicity with the fly. Desperate for capital to appease his furious investors, Sudeep murders Adithya to fraudulently collect a ₹700 crore corporate insurance policy.

Sudeep forcefully brings Bindu to his mansion to interrogate her, closely followed by Nani. When Bindu attempts to defend herself with a box cutter, Sudeep overpowers her and threatens her life to force Nani to reveal himself. During the confrontation, Nani coordinates with Bindu and severely injures Sudeep using a dropped sewing needle. Following an intense struggle, Sudeep clips Nani's wing and fatally stabs the fly with the same needle. In a final, sacrificial effort, the dying Nani coats his body in household gunpowder, leaps through the flame of a burning match, and dives into a miniature decorative cannon loaded with a steel ball. The cannon fires, launching the projectile directly through Sudeep's chest and into a nearby oxygen cylinder. The resulting massive explosion kills Sudeep and incinerates the mansion.

A surviving Bindu grieves for Nani, later fashioning an amulet out of his detached wing. Sometime later, while traveling, Bindu is harassed by a stalker; Nani, having been reborn once again as a housefly, attacks the aggressor with a needle, signaling his return.

== Cast ==
- Nani as Nani
  - A Fly as a reincarnation of Nani (Voice dubbed by SS Rajamouli)
- Samantha as Bindu (Voice dubbed by Chinmayi)
- Sudeepa as Sudeep
- Adithya as Sudeep's business partner
- Thagubothu Ramesh (Telugu version) as a drunk thief who loves Bindu
- Santhanam (Tamil version) as Poottu Govindhan, a thief who loves Bindu
- Chatrapathi Sekhar as a tantric sorcerer who knows about Nani
- Noel Sean as Noel, Nani's friend
- Srinivasa Reddy as Sudeep's personal assistant
- Sivannarayana Naripeddi as a temple priest
- Devadarshini as Bindu's sister-in-law
- Rajeev Kanakala as the thief's manager
- Dhanraj as the thief's friend
- Sri Simha as Bindu's colleague
- R. K. as Sudeep's colleague
- Hamsa Nandini as Sasikala (cameo appearance)
- Crazy Mohan as Dr. Kameshwara Iyer (cameo appearance, Tamil version)

== Production ==
=== Origin, scripting, and casting ===
I heard the story [of Eega] 16 years ago from my father about a fly who comes back to take revenge. At that time, I wasn't even an assistant director. When I started making films, I stuck to formula films for a while which did well at the box office. After a while, I was getting too comfortable with what I was doing, so I wanted to experiment with something completely different. I wanted to take the audience by surprise and that is when I went back to the story I had heard 16 years ago.

— Rajamouli in October 2012 on the origin of the film.

The idea of Eega originated in the mid-1990s in screenwriter V. Vijayendra Prasad's mind. At that time, he was joking about a housefly seeking revenge on a human in a conversation with his son S. S. Rajamouli. Prasad later developed the idea as a script for an English-language film set in 1830s America, in which an African-American boy dies in an attempt to free his family from slavery and is reincarnated as a fly. After completing Maryada Ramanna (2010), Rajamouli reconsidered the concept after thinking of directing a film that was distinct from any other. He decided to make Eega a bilingual film in Telugu and Tamil – each scene including speech was filmed twice, once for each language. The Tamil version, titled Naan Ee, was Rajamouli's directorial debut in Tamil cinema. The film was presented by D. Suresh Babu of Suresh Productions. (Note: A film presenter is generally a well-known filmmaker who helps in introducing a film to a larger section of the audience.)

For the first time in his career, Rajamouli began casting after the script was completed because he felt the story required actors who were suitable for the roles. Nani, the protagonist, was the first of the three of the main cast members to be chosen; he completed filming his scenes in 25 days. (Note: Rajamouli reshot the entire film, and it is not clear from Nani's interview whether the 25 days includes both versions of the shooting schedule.) Samantha, the second actor cast, was signed as the female lead. Rajamouli chose Sudeepa to play the fly's human adversary after being impressed with the actor's performance in Rann (2010), and cast rapper Noel Sean as Nani's friend in the film. Sudeepa drew inspiration for his role as the villain from the 1983 Kannada film Bhakta Prahlada; he was portraying a character he considered to be a "bad guy" with "grey shades" rather than an antagonist.

The script was doctored by Rajamouli's cousin, S. S. Kanchi, while Janardhana Maharshi and Crazy Mohan wrote the dialogue for the Telugu and Tamil versions respectively, marking their first collaboration with Rajamouli. James Fowlds was initially chosen as the film's director of photography, but was replaced by K. K. Senthil Kumar due to creative differences and scheduling conflicts. M. M. Keeravani composed the film's soundtrack and score, (Note: M. M. Keeravani used the pseudonyms Maragathamani for the Tamil version, Vedanarayana for the Malayalam dubbed version, and M. M. Kreem for the Hindi dubbed version.) Kotagiri Venkateswara Rao edited the film, Ravinder Reddy was its art director, and Rajamouli's wife Rama worked on the costume design.

Production of the film began with a formal launch ceremony on 7 December 2010 in Hyderabad. The initial version of the fly animation was ready by November. Rajamouli felt the quality of the animation was poor. He wanted to shelve the movie, but by that point, around 50% of the movie was already shot, costing approximately 10-11 crores. He asked the team to rework on the animation from scratch. (Note: The average exchange rate in 2011 was 51.10 Indian rupees (₹) per 1 US dollar (US$).) The film's final budget was estimated at between ₹30 and ₹40 crore.

=== Filming and post-production ===
Principal photography began on 22 February 2011 in Hyderabad; ninety percent of the film was shot at Ramanaidu Studios in the city. A sequence was filmed at Sri Sita Ramachandra Swamy Temple in Ammapally near Shamshabad, in early March 2011. Scenes with Nani, Samantha, and Sudeepa were filmed during the first shooting schedule, which was completed on 16 March. Shooting was disrupted in April by an ongoing labour dispute between film workers and producers. Rajamouli considered moving Eega out of Hyderabad if the strike continued. Filming continued in Kokapet in early September 2011, and principal photography was completed in late February 2012 as post-production began.

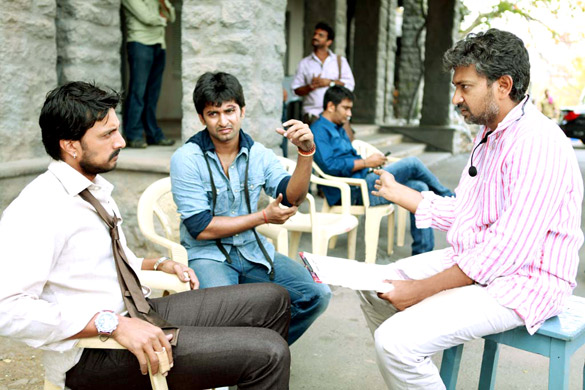
Sudeepa (left), Nani (middle), and Rajamouli during filming

According to Rajamouli, the film unit consulted a 3D video of the storyboard before shooting a scene each day. After the filming of each scene was completed, the editing and re-recording procedures were done with simple greyscale animation. An Arri Alexa camera, a prime lens, and Scorpio and Strada cranes were used for the principal photography, while a probe lens and high-intensity lighting were used for the macro photography. Senthil Kumar had to use a special lens with a minimum f-stop of f8.0; the wide apertures required high-intensity lighting to get acceptable shots. He used GoPro cameras as they were the smallest possible ones that offered close to professional resolution. Phantom Cam was used to film extreme slow motion sequences; certain scenes were shot at 2,000 frames per second.

Digital intermediate (DI) was conducted at Annapurna Studios in Hyderabad. A high-end DI system was imported and the process took six months to complete. Singer Chinmayi, who dubbed for Samantha in Eega, found the process difficult because the footage did not contain the animated fly. This was the first non-Kannada film to credit Sudeepa (previously Sudeep) by his new stage name. Rajamouli approached Anuj Gurwara to write the dialogue for the Hindi-dubbed version titled Makkhi. The Hindi dubbing began in Hyderabad, and Gurwara dubbed for Nani in the film. Ajay Devgn and Kajol, acting as parents telling the film's story to their child at bedtime, provided voiceovers during the opening credits of Makkhi. The visuals accompanying the closing credits were altered to show the fly mimicking the antics of Devgn, Salman Khan, and Akshay Kumar.

=== Visual effects ===
R. C. Kamalakannan and Pete Draper of Makuta VFX oversaw Eega's visual effects, and Rahul Venugopal was the film's set supervisor and matte painter. V. Srinivas Mohan, who later collaborated with Rajamouli on Baahubali: The Beginning, worked on a short sequence for the film. Rajamouli planned to complete work on the fly imagery in four months, but it took fourteen.

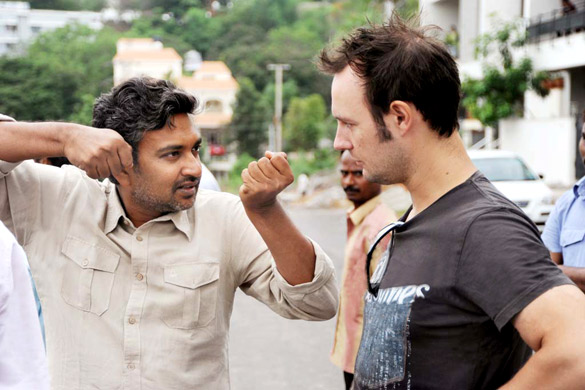
Rajamouli and Draper on the set

Ninety percent of the animation-related work was done in Hyderabad; the remaining ten percent was completed in the United States. In an Indo-Asian News Service interview, Draper said he collaborated with thirteen experts and a large team of animators to design the fly. Because the film's fly's eyes comprise 80 percent of its face, Rajamouli felt they could make it expressive; he used the 1986 Pixar American short film Luxo Jr. for inspiration. The output of the first team of animators, using the reference material prepared, was unsatisfactory, and Rajamouli reworked the fly's detailing. Using a powerful lens, the film team conducted an arduous photographic shoot of unconscious flies in a bottle stored in a refrigerator. After enlarging the details, Rajamouli made cosmetic changes to the fly's face to make it look appealing onscreen. A new team, including Draper, three concept artists, three modellers, two shader designers, two hair and fur designers, three riggers and several animators, designed the animated fly in two months. Its head and fur were designed after shaping its body and wings. The fly was refined daily using clay models to expedite the process. The animators found the sequences between Sudeepa and the fly much more difficult to execute because the latter had to express emotions only through its slender arms rather than its face.

Some of the special effects could not be designed in India, so Makuta VFX engaged animation consultants in Armenia, China, Iran, Israel, Russia, the United Kingdom, and the United States. The company's 30-member team underwent a training programme on acting theory and insect formats. Eega is the first Indian film to use computer-generated imagery for nearly 90 minutes of its length; the film had 2,234 live-action animation shots. By mid-June 2012, Rajamouli had approved 1,970 shots; the final version was shown to the film unit after the approval of 226 pending shots. The visual effects cost an estimated ₹7 crore.

== Themes ==
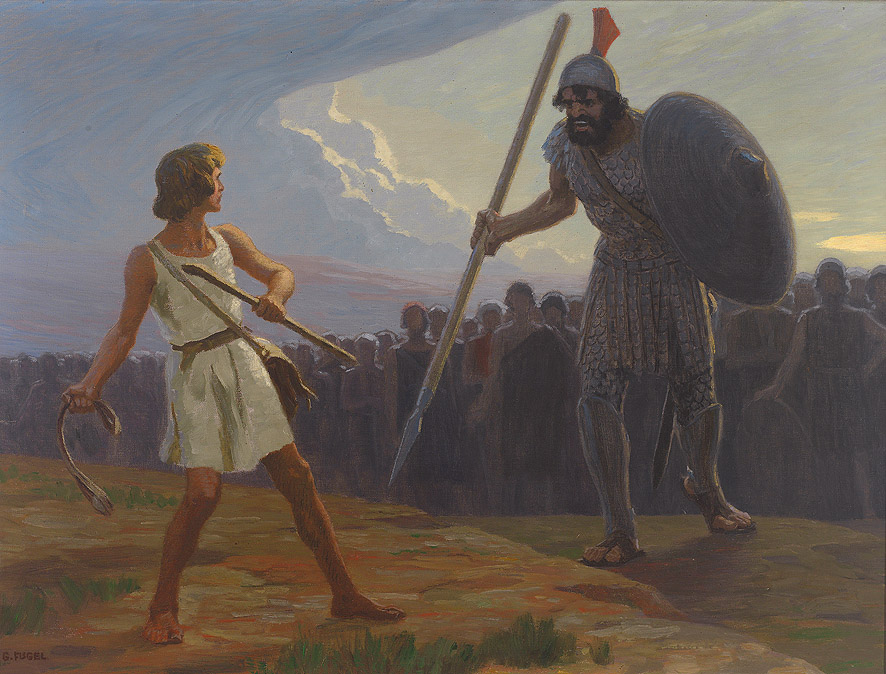
Rajamouli compared the battle between the fly and Sudeepa with that between David and Goliath (pictured), saying that victories by underdogs matter.

The film's main theme is revenge; the soul of a murdered man is reincarnated as a fly and seeks revenge against his killer. Rajamouli identified some similarities to David Cronenberg's The Fly (1986), in which a scientist becomes a fly when his experiment malfunctions, and thought of Eega as a "socio-fantasy" rather than a science fiction film. At a meeting with students at the Annapurna International School of Film and Media Campus (AIFSM), he compared the battle between the fly and Sudeepa, which the underdog fly wins, to David's triumph over Goliath and India's victory in the 1983 Cricket World Cup. Crazy Mohan compared the film with Apoorva Sagodharargal (1989), a revenge drama whose protagonist Appu (Kamal Haasan) is a dwarf.

Mohan told Malathi Rangarajan of The Hindu that although the film's script may resemble those of Stuart Little (1999) and Shrek (2001), the use of the plight of someone tormented by a housefly was an original idea. According to Tamil film historian and actor Mohan Raman, Naan Ee—unlike the animal-centred films Nalla Neram (1972) and Neeya? (1979)—lacks a human protagonist. Film critic Baradwaj Rangan found Eega's protagonist realistic, contrary to the ones in the animated films by the Walt Disney Company, except when it displays a few anthropomorphic traits. Mid-Day compared Eega to Cockroach (2010), an Australian short film about a man who is reincarnated as a cockroach after he is accidentally killed on his wedding day.

The film's secondary theme is the survival of love beyond death. Rangan has likened Eega to a ghost film because a dead protagonist returns to his loved ones as a troubled soul. Malini Mannath of The New Indian Express found the scene where the fly foils Sudeepa's attempt to get close to Bindu reminiscent of one in the film Ghost (1990). Mayank Shekhar criticised the relationship between the lead pair, which he said advocates stalking as an accepted form of romance. Malathi Rangarajan said the antagonist took the "extreme step" of murdering the hero early in the film, in contrast with the stereotypical antagonist whose lust for the female lead has just begun and threatens the hero.

Commenting on the usage of Tantrism, The New Indian Express' Kruthi Grover found the death of the sorcerer similar to the story of Bhasmasura, a demon in Indian mythology to whom Shiva gives the power to reduce a person to ashes by touching her or his head. When Bhasmasura tries to touch Shiva's head, Vishnu assumes the form of Mohini and makes Bhasmasura touch his own head, killing him. According to Malathi Rangarajan, the film's themes of Tantrism and black magic are reminiscent of the use of the occult as a plot device in films directed by B. Vittalacharya.

== Music ==
The soundtracks of Eega and Naan Ee, each consisting of five songs—one of which is a remixed version of the film's title song—were composed by M. M. Keeravani. Keeravani said because the film's theme of revenge and the protagonist (a housefly) are universal concepts, his "only challenge" was ensuring the music did not have a "distinct ethnic or regional flavour" and "appeal". He incorporated the buzzing sound made by flies into the score and exaggerated or reduced it according to a scene's emotional nature. Rajamouli approached Madhan Karky to write the lyrics for Naan Ee's soundtrack after the release of Enthiran (2010), explaining the importance of each song in the film's narrative. As well as providing detailed profiles of the characters, Rajamouli enacted a few scenes, which helped Karky write the lyrics.

Eega's soundtrack was released on 4 April 2012 at a promotional event at Shanti Sarovar, Brahma Kumaris' academy in Gachibowli, a suburb of Hyderabad. The soundtrack for Naan Ee was released on 2 May at another promotional event at Sathyam Cinema in Chennai. Eega's soundtrack release on iTunes was delayed until 7 April to avoid piracy and illegal downloads.

Writing for The Hindu, Sangeetha Devi Dundoo called the soundtrack "melodious ... sharply contrasted by the background score, which seamlessly moves from sober to playful to pulsating". Another critic for The Hindu, S. R. Ashok Kumar praised Vijay Prakash's rendition of "Konjam Konjam". Kumar appreciated the use of violins in "Eedaa Eedaa" and called "Lava Lava" "a good number". Karthik Pasupulate of The Times of India wrote that Keeravani "just seems to reserve his best for [Rajamouli]", calling the soundtrack "one of his finest".

== Release ==
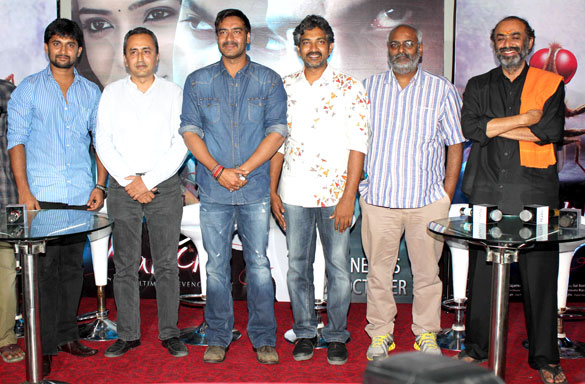
Left to right: Nani, Sanjeev Lamba, Ajay Devgan, S. S. Rajamouli, M. M. Keeravani, and D. Suresh Babu at the special screening of Makkhi, the Hindi dubbed version of Eega, in Mumbai

Eega, with Naan Ee and Eecha, was released on 6 July 2012 on approximately 1,100 screens. (Note: The Hindu estimated the film's global screen count as 1,100, while The Times of India estimated the film's global screen count to be 1,200.) The Government of Tamil Nadu levied entertainment tax on Naan Ee at the rate of 30%. Eega's Hindi-dubbed version, titled Makkhi, was released on 12 October 2012. The film was further dubbed into Swahili as Inzi and released with the slogan "Kisasi Cha Mwisho" (Fly: the ultimate revenge). Inzi was released in Tanzania, Kenya, Uganda, Rwanda, Burundi, and Republic of the Congo, making Eega the first Telugu film to be released in Africa.

=== Distribution ===
Global distribution rights for the Telugu version were sold for ₹34 crore (US$6.24 million), and PVP Cinema acquired Naan Ee's distribution rights for ₹5 crore. Outside India, 14 Reels Entertainment distributed Eega and Naan Ee in association with Ficus, Inc. Reliance Entertainment acquired Makkhi's distribution rights.

=== Piracy issues ===
Weeks after Eega's release, its pirated version was released; it was illegally filmed in a theatre in Varadaiahpalem, Chittoor district. A forensic watermarking investigation on the pirated copies determined that a camcorder was used in the process. The digital watermarking also helped investigators locate the source of the piracy of Naan Ee to a theatre in Coimbatore.

According to Rajamouli, Eega was illegally downloaded 655,000 times within a week of the pirated version being leaked on the Internet. Rajamouli added that a database of IP addresses of non-resident Indians who frequently download content was shared with immigration authorities which could affect their potential US residence permit applications. The anti-piracy cell delinked more than 2,000 links to the pirated versions of Naan Ee on the internet.

=== Home media ===
Naan Ee's satellite television rights were sold to Sun TV for ₹3.35 crore—a record price for a Telugu director's film, exceeding Rajamouli's initial expectations. Makkhi's television-broadcast rights were sold to STAR Gold for ₹8 crore. According to STAR Gold general manager Hemal Jhaveri, Makkhi's television premiere had a target rating point rating of 3.5; trade analyst Sreedhar Pillai called its performance "phenomenal".

In November 2012, Aditya Music released Eega on Blu-ray with English subtitles and DTS-HD MA 5.1 surround sound. The release also contained a two-hour DVD about the making of the film. J. Hurtado of Twitch Film reviewed the Blu-ray version, writing, "The most egregious mangling of the film comes in the form of a severely fucked contrast scale, which leads to absurdly crushed black levels rendering nearly all shadow detail completely obliterated". Hurtado called the audio a "thing of beauty, giving good separation and a booming low end that puts you in the middle of the Eega action in a way that even my theatrical experience couldn't do".

== Reception ==
=== Box office ===
According to trade analyst Komal Nahta, Eega netted ₹17 crore in South India on its first day of release. In ten days, Naan Ee grossed ₹13 crore from 208 screens in Tamil Nadu. On its second weekend, Eega grossed $253,334 from 42 screens in the US, bringing its ten-day total in that country to $913,046. By then, Naan Ee had grossed a total of $14,259 in the United States. Naan Ee earned ₹18 crore in three weeks at the Tamil Nadu box office—a record for a bilingual, Telugu-Tamil film. By early August 2012, the combined distributor share for the Telugu and Tamil versions was ₹57 crore. The Hindi-dubbed version, Makkhi, had not achieved equivalent commercial success as of June 2015.

According to Bangalore Mirror, the film grossed ₹115 crore globally as of August 2012. Its final global gross is estimated at ₹125 to 130 crore ($23–24 million). It was declared the highest-grossing bilingual film in Tamil Nadu after it earned ₹24.66 crore, with a distributor share of ₹8.5 crore, in 50 days. The film broke the record held by Arundhati (2009), whose Tamil-dubbed version earned a distributor share of ₹6.5 crore.

Indo-Asian News Service stated that Eega was the highest-grossing Telugu film of 2012, but Bangalore Mirror said it was the second-highest (after Gabbar Singh) in box-office revenue. According to Deccan Herald, Eega and Julayi were the only 2012 big-budget Telugu films to break even and have a positive audience response. Makkhi opened poorly, despite positive word-of-mouth, eventually ending up as an average grosser. Regarding the performance of Makkhi, Rajamouli felt the film was poorly presented and did not reach its theatrical audience even though it was better received on television, and so later on collaborated with filmmaker Karan Johar – whom he considered the "one missing link" – on the presentation of the Hindi-dubbed version of his later film, Baahubali: The Beginning.

=== Critical response ===
On the review aggregator website Rotten Tomatoes, 100% of 10 critics' reviews are positive, with an average rating of 7.5/10.

Baradwaj Rangan, writing for The Hindu, said without a human protagonist, only a villain and a heroine, the audience is "led through a story that's funny, sentimental, action-packed, romantic—there's even a bit of the occult thrown in". Also for The Hindu, Malathi Rangarajan wrote, "Let's celebrate the figment of [Rajamouli's] imagination that has made the housefly appear as invincible as any of our muscle-flexing heroes". Karishma Upadhyay of The Telegraph called the film "a winner from the first frame to the last" and praised Rajamouli's screenplay, writing that it made "the absurd seem real, willing you to accept anything that he throws at you". J. Hurtado of Twitch Film called Eega the "best, most insane, most inventive film of the year", and praised Rajamouli's scripting, the visual effects and Sudeepa's performance, calling the latter "legitimately hilarious". V. S. Rajapur, Indo-Asian News Service gave Eega four stars out of five, and praised the performances and music; Rajapur was particularly appreciative of the visual effects, saying the hard work put in by the entire team was "clearly visible onscreen". A reviewer from Sify called Eega an "escapist, comic book-like fantasy" that "throws you into an experience so profound that nothing else really matters".

Radhika Rajamani of Rediff.com awarded Eega four stars out of five; she praised its visual effects, performances and cinematography and said Sudeepa "is such a delight to watch on screen". Karthik Pasupulate and M. Suganth of The Times of India both gave Eega four stars out of five; Pasupulate said it offers a "mind-bending thrill-a-second ride of the season, probably the decade". Suganth called it a "bravura piece of commercial filmmaking that is an unqualified triumph in every aspect". Rajeev Masand of News18 gave the film four stars out of five and praised its concept, and said Sudeepa played his role with a "true comic book flair" and a "cartoonish tinge". Writing for Bollywood Hungama, Subhash K. Jha praised Eega's "sharp clenched narrative", which overshadowed the "shaky plot". He further wrote, "Gutsy sly and original, this is the entertainer of the season". Anupama Chopra gave the film four stars out of five in a review for Hindustan Times and called it a "mad roller coaster ride that's worth taking" and the "most outlandish film [she has] seen in years". Shabana Ansari rated Eega three stars out of five in a Daily News and Analysis review and called the animated fly a "new-age Indian hero" with "lofty ideas". Jeevi of Idlebrain.com rated the film four out of five and wrote, "On a whole, Eega is a must watch film in theaters".

Kruthi Grover of The New Indian Express wrote that Eega lacks a proper structure despite having effective visual effects and editing. She added that the film turns into a "silly animated movie for kids" after the fly's birth. Reviewing Makkhi for Dainik Bhaskar, Mayank Shekhar said the film's premise is stretched beyond its potential and that as a result, it "just goes on and on and on" in its "original, tacky, raw form".

== Accolades ==
Eega received the Best Feature Film in Telugu and Best Special Effects awards at the 60th National Film Awards. It later received a B. Nagi Reddy Memorial Award as Best Wholesome Entertainment from the Government of Andhra Pradesh. At the 60th Filmfare Awards South Eega received seven nominations and won five awards, including Best Film – Telugu, Best Director – Telugu, and Best Supporting Actor – Telugu (Sudeepa).

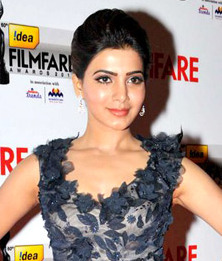
Samantha at the 60th Filmfare Awards South ceremony, where she won the Best Actress – Telugu award for Eega

Samantha received Filmfare Best Actress awards in the Telugu and Tamil categories for her performances in Eega and Neethaane En Ponvasantham, becoming the third Indian female actor to win these awards in both languages in the same year (after J. Jayalalithaa and Revathi, who won 1972 and 1993 Best Actress awards for Sri Krishna Satya, Pattikada Pattanama and Thevar Magan and Ankuram respectively). At the 2nd South Indian International Movie Awards, Eega received seven nominations and won three awards; Best Film, Best Cinematographer, and Best Actor in a Negative Role. Ravinder Reddy won the Best Art Direction Award at the 2013 Fantaspoa International Fantastic Film Festival in Brazil for his work in Eega. The film won nine awards, including Most Original Film, Best Film to Watch With a Crowd, and Best Special Effects at the eighth annual Toronto After Dark Film Festival in November 2013. At the 7th Vijay Awards in 2013, Sudeepa won the Best Villain Award for his performance in Naan Ee. Eega won eight awards at the 2012 Nandi Awards, including Best Director, Best Villain and Best Music Director for Rajamouli, Sudeepa and M. M. Keeravani respectively.

The film's Telugu version was shown at film festivals worldwide. In December 2012, it was shown at the annual Chennai International Film Festival. After showings at the L'Étrange and Sundance film festivals, it was the only Telugu film screened in the Marché du Film section of the 2013 Cannes Film Festival and the panorama section of the 2013 Shanghai International Film Festival.

Eega is the only Telugu film to receive six nominations at the Madrid International Film Festival, and is the first Indian Best Film nominee. Nominations at the 2013 edition of the film festival included Best Film, Best Supporting Actor (Sudeepa), and Best Cinematographer (Senthil Kumar). The film was invited to the 2013 Bucheon International Fantastic Film Festival in South Korea, and was the fifth foreign-language film shown at the 18th Busan International Film Festival in October 2013.

== Legacy ==
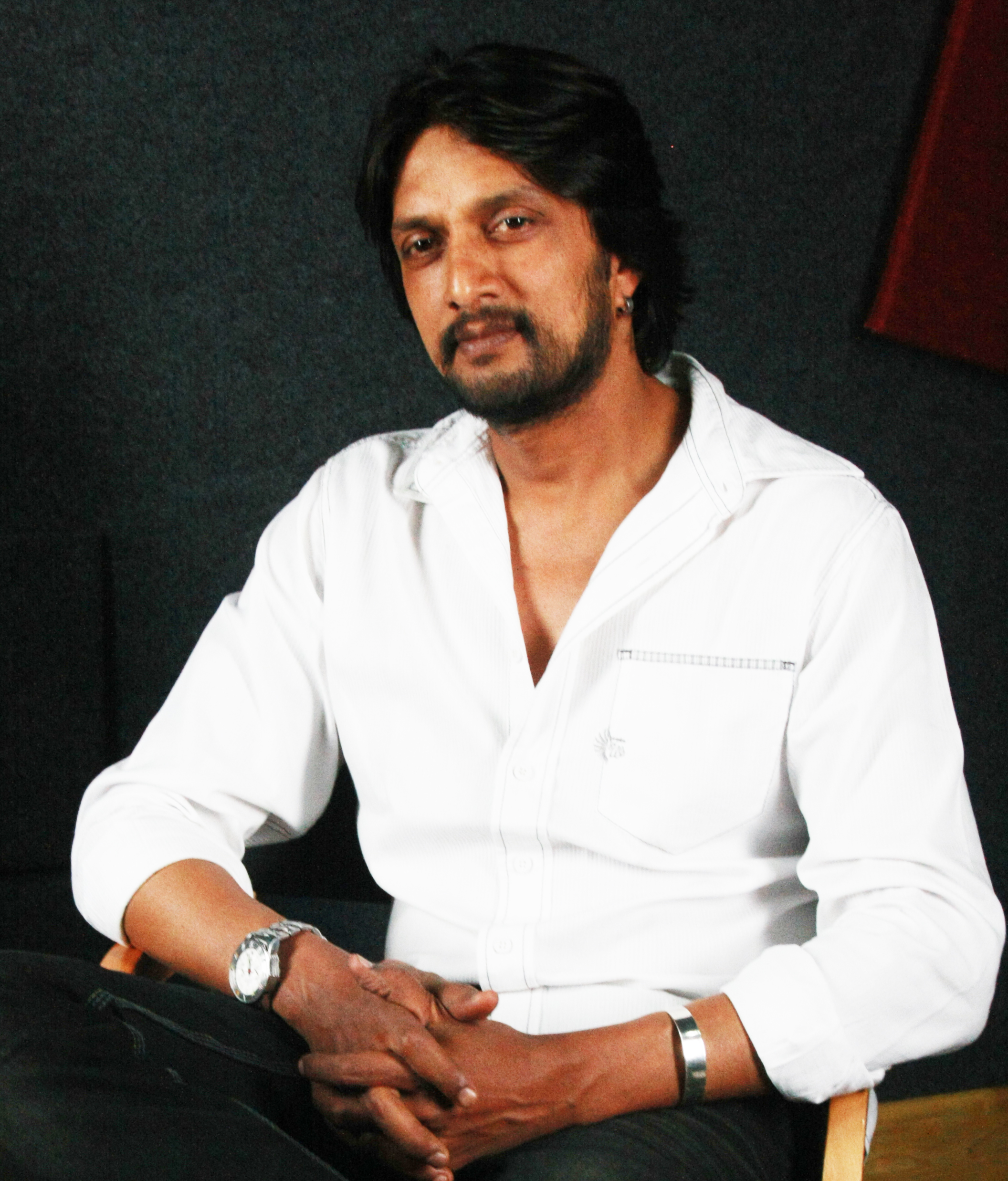
Eega's success gave Sudeepa national recognition and acclaim from fellow actors, including Rajinikanth and Nagarjuna.

Sudeepa received national recognition for his performance in Eega; Rajinikanth told him, "I thought I was the best villain to date. But you beat me to it". His performance was appreciated by other celebrities such as Nagarjuna, Mahesh Babu, and Ram Gopal Varma; Varma said he recognised Sudeepa's potential after watching Eega, adding, "Many take his acting in that film for granted, with respect to his expressions when interacting with the fly, but as a director, I know how difficult it is to act when you are imagining the fly to be there". Sudeepa's performance in Naan Ee impressed filmmaker Chimbu Deven, who cast him as the antagonist in Puli (2015).

Speaking about the centenary of Indian cinema at the CII Media & Entertainment Summit 2012, filmmaker Shekhar Kapur said regional cinema is surpassing Hindi cinema in content and story, and cited Eega as an example. Kapur said he was impressed with its story and use of technology, and called it "no less than a Hollywood superhero film". Shah Rukh Khan called Eega an "awesomely original" film and a "must watch" with children. Lavanya Tripathi cited Nani's performance in Eega as one of the reasons she worked with him in Bhale Bhale Magadivoy (2015).

Eega was parodied twice in Bhimaneni Srinivasa Rao's comedy film Sudigadu (2012); when a young girl asks her father to tell her a bedtime story in the opening credits, and in a scene in which the protagonist threatens to kill a female crime boss with weapons designed by Rajamouli, including the fly's needle. The film was also parodied in the Tamil film Kaththi (2014) in which Samantha states that her past lover is dead and reincarnated as a fly.

In December 2012, Eega and Sudeepa topped Radhika Rajamani's Rediff.com "Top Five Telugu Films of 2012" and "Best Telugu Actors of 2012" lists; according to her, Sudeepa left an "indelible" mark on the film and gave an "exceptionally good account" of himself as the antagonist. Shobha Warrier of Reddif placed Sudeepa on her list of "Top Tamil Actors of 2012", writing that his performance was "so superlative and far superior to any other actor's in Tamil" that it "has to be termed as the best performance of the year". Radhika Rajamani ranked Rajamouli first on her "Top Telugu Directors of 2012" list, which was published in January 2013. In 2020, Sankeertana Verma of Film Companion included the film in her list of "25 Greatest Telugu Films Of The Decade". Adam Nayman of The Ringer listed Eega among "The 25 Best Foreign Films of the Decade". In August 2015, Pooja Darade of The Times of India included Eega in her list of "Telugu movies one must watch before dying"; she said it "has set a high standard of how creativity can be used effectively". In an April 2016 interview with The Hindu, Tamil actor Suriya said films like Sagara Sangamam (1983), Eega, Baahubali: The Beginning, and Manam (2014) are remembered much longer than more conventional films.

In 2019, the film's plot was widely shared on social media in Spanish-speaking countries because of its unique plot that involved a fly taking revenge on a human.
