= High Tension (disambiguation) =

High Tension is a 2003 French slasher film.

High Tension may also refer to:

== Film and television ==
- High Tension (1936 film), an American comedy drama
- This Can't Happen Here, also released as High Tension, a 1950 Swedish film
- High Tension (TV series), an Indian reality show

== Music ==
- High Tension (band), an Australian band
- "High Tension" (song), by AKB48, 2016

== See also ==
- High voltage, or high tension
- High Voltage (disambiguation)
- HT (disambiguation)
- Hypertension, high blood pressure
- Overhead power line, a structure used in electric power transmission
