= Tau Films =

American visual effects and animation company

- Company type: Private
- Industry: Visual effects, Computer animation
- Predecessor: Rhythm & Hues
- Founded: 2014; 12 years ago
- Founders: John Hughes, Mandeep Singh, and Walt Jones
- Headquarters: United States, Malaysia, India, China, Canada.
- Services: Visual effects, Computer animation
- Website: taufilms.com

Tau Films is an American visual effects and animation company with locations in the United States, Malaysia, India, China, and Canada.

== History ==
Tau Films was founded in 2014 by John Hughes, Mandeep Singh, and Walt Jones. In 2015, it was nominated for Outstanding Visual Effects in a Special Venue Project at the 13th Visual Effects Society Awards for its work on the amusement park special venue-ride film The Lost Temple (Movie Park Germany). It has since produced other special venue-ride films such as The Forbidden Caves (Bobbejaanland) and Racing Legends at Ferrari Land (PortAventura World:Ferrari Land). It also created Delusion: Lies Within (virtual reality episodic storytelling). Tau has worked on films such as Evil Nature (2018), Baahubali: The Beginning (2015), 2.0 (2018), Crazy Alien (2019), the 2019 Nicolas Cage film Primal, Simon West's Skyfire (2019), and Li Weiran's The Yinyang Master (2021).

== Filmography ==
2025

- Baahubali: The Epic

2021

- The Battle at Lake Changjin (release date September 30, 2021)
- The Yinyang Master

2019

- Skyfire
- Primal
- Crazy Alien

2018

- 2.0
- Delusion: Lies Within
- Evil Nature

2017

- WildAid: Jackie Chan & Pangolins (Kung Fu Pangolin)
- Racing Legends at Ferrari Land (PortAventura World:Ferrari Land)

2015

- Baahubali: The Beginning
- Everest
- Hogwarts Express - London (Warner Bros. Studio Tour London- Platform 9¾)
- The Forbidden Caves (Bobbejaanland)

2014

- The Lost Temple (Movie Park Germany)

== Awards and nominations ==
- 2015: Nominated - Outstanding Visual Effects in a Special Venue Project, 13th Visual Effects Society Awards. The Lost Temple (Movie Park Germany)
