= Baahubali: The Beginning =

2015 Indian film by S. S. Rajamouli

- Theatrical release poster
- Directed by: S. S. Rajamouli
- Screenplay by: S. S. Rajamouli
- Story by: V. Vijayendra Prasad
- Dialogues by: C. H. Vijay Kumar (Telugu); Madhan Karky (Tamil)
- Produced by: Shobu Yarlagadda; Prasad Devineni
- Starring: Prabhas; Rana Daggubati; Anushka Shetty; Tamannaah Bhatia; Sathyaraj; Nassar; Ramya Krishna
- Cinematography: K. K. Senthil Kumar
- Edited by: Kotagiri Venkateswara Rao
- Music by: M. M. Keeravani
- Production company: Arka Media Works
- Distributed by: Arka Media Works (Telugu); Global United Media (Malayalam); Studio Green, Sri Thenandal Films (Tamil); Dharma Productions, AA Films (Hindi)
- Release date: 10 July 2015
- Running time: 158 minutes (Telugu); 159 minutes (Tamil)
- Country: India
- Languages: Telugu; Tamil
- Budget: ₹170 crore
- Box office: ₹600–650 crore (Note: Box Office India, India Today, and The Indian Express mentioned the worldwide collection as ₹600 crore. Firstpost reported the collection as ₹650 crore.)

Baahubali: The Beginning (Note: Styled in official material as bāhubaLi; transl. 'The One with Strong Arms') is a 2015 Indian epic action film co-written and directed by S. S. Rajamouli, and produced by Shobu Yarlagadda and Prasad Devineni under Arka Media Works. Produced in the Telugu film industry, (Note: Attributed to multiple sources) the film was shot in both Telugu and Tamil languages. It features Prabhas in a dual role alongside Rana Daggubati, Anushka, Tamannaah Bhatia, Ramya Krishnan, Sathyaraj, and Nassar. The first of a duology of films, it follows Sivudu, an adventurous young man who helps his love Avantika rescue Devasena, the princess of Kunthala who is now a prisoner under the tyrannical rule of king Bhallaladeva. The film is the first part of the duology. The story concludes in Baahubali 2: The Conclusion (2017).

The film's story was written by Rajamouli's father V. Vijayendra Prasad, who told him a story about Sivagami, a woman who carries a baby in her hand while crossing a river, and a few years later about Kattappa, which intrigued Rajamouli. His fascination with Mahabharata and the tales of Amar Chitra Katha and Chandamama further fueled his interest in the story. It took the writers three months to complete the final draft. The soundtrack and background score were composed by M. M. Keeravani, while cinematography, production design, and visual effects (VFX) were handled by K. K. Senthil Kumar, Sabu Cyril, and V. Srinivas Mohan.

The film was made on a budget of ₹170 crore ($26.4 million), (Note: The average exchange rate in 2015 was 64.15 Indian rupees (₹) per 1 US dollar (US$).) making it the most expensive Indian film at its time of release. The film opened worldwide on 10 July 2015 along with the dubbed versions in Hindi and Malayalam. It received national and international acclaim for Rajamouli's direction, story, visual effects, cinematography, themes, action sequences, music, and performances, and became a record-breaking box office success. With a worldwide box office gross of ₹600–650 crore, it became the highest-grossing Telugu film and the second highest-grossing Indian film worldwide at the time of its release. It is currently the sixth highest-grossing Telugu film of all time. At the time of its release, it also became the highest-grossing Tamil film at the time of its release. Its Hindi dubbed version also broke several records by becoming the highest-grossing dubbed film in Hindi of all time. Both budget and box office records have since been surpassed by Baahubali 2: The Conclusion, the highest-grossing film in India of all time.

Baahubali: The Beginning along with its successor, is widely regarded as one of the most influential films of Indian cinema. It became the first Indian film to be nominated for Saturn Awards, receiving five nominations at the 42nd ceremony, including Best Fantasy Film and Best Supporting Actress. It received several accolades such as the National Film Award for Best Feature Film, and the National Award for Best Special Effects. It won five awards from ten nominations, including Best Telugu Film, Best Director – Telugu for Rajamouli, and Best Supporting Actress – Telugu for Ramya Krishna respectively, at the 63rd Filmfare Awards South. A combined recut version of The Beginning and The Conclusion, titled Baahubali: The Epic, was theatrically released worldwide on 31 October 2025.

== Plot ==
An injured woman emerges from a hidden cave beneath a massive waterfall, carrying an infant. While attempting to cross a raging river, she is swept away by the current. Facing imminent death, she submerges beneath the water but holds the infant aloft, praying to Lord Shiva to preserve the child's life for the sake of his mother and the kingdom of Mahishmati. The child is rescued by the tribesmen of Amburi. Sanga, the chieftain's wife, adopts and names him Sivudu.

Sivudu grows up to be an exceptionally strong man, obsessed with scaling the towering waterfall. With his superhuman strength, he uproots a massive stone Shiva Lingam and places it directly beneath the waterfall to satisfy his foster mother's religious vows. As he does so, he finds a wooden mask washed down the waterfall. Curious to find where it's from, Sivudu successfully scales the waterfall for the first time. At the summit, he encounters Avantika, the mask's owner, who is a warrior from a rebel alliance.

The alliance is dedicated to rescuing Devasena, a former queen who has been held captive for 25 years by Bhallaladeva, the despotic ruler of Mahishmati. Kattappa, the royal slave-commander of Mahishmati, is bound by a sacred oath of absolute fealty to the throne despite detesting Bhallaladeva's tyranny. He witnesses Devasena suffering, but she refuses to escape, believing that her long-lost son will return to liberate her.

Smitten by Avantika, Sivudu vows to complete the rebels' mission, and infiltrates Mahishmati in disguise during Bhallaladeva's birthday celebrations. He rescues civilians from being crushed by a colossal golden statue of the king. During the chaos, an elderly artisan recognizes Sivudu's face, prompting the entire crowd to chant the name "Baahubali," which infuriates Bhallaladeva. That evening, Sivudu rescues Devasena and flees the city. They are pursued by Bhallaladeva's son Bhadra, and Kattappa's royal guard. In the ensuing confrontation, Sivudu overpowers the forces and decapitates Bhadra. As Kattappa prepares to strike back, he catches a clear glimpse of Sivudu's face under the moonlight. Recognizing his striking resemblance to the former king, Kattappa kneels and proclaims Sivudu as Mahendra Baahubali, the rightful heir to the throne. When the rebel forces and Amburi tribesmen demand answers, Kattappa narrates the story of Amarendra Bahubali.

Twenty-five years prior, following the sudden demise of Mahishmati's ruler, King Vikramadeva, his sister-in-law Sivagami assumes regency over the unstable kingdom. She raises both her biological son, Bhallaladeva, and Vikramadeva's orphaned son Amarendra Baahubali with equal affection, declaring that the throne will be awarded to whichever prince proves more worthy. While Bhallaladeva grows into an arrogant and power-hungry warrior under the influence of his disgruntled father Bijjaladeva, Amarendra Baahubali wins the adoration of the populace through actions and leadership.

The rivalry between the princes reaches its peak when Mahishmati faces an invasion by the Kalakeya tribe. Sivagami commands both princes to lead separate divisions of the royal army, promising the crown to whoever slays the Kalakeya chieftain, Inkoshi. Throughout the brutal warfare, Bhallaladeva uses a ruthless, mechanical chariot that massacres innocent civilians to clear his path, whereas Baahubali employs ingenious tactics and risks his life to protect his soldiers and the hostage populace. Although Bhallaladeva ultimately kills Inkoshi, Sivagami officially names Amarendra Baahubali as the future Emperor of Mahishmati, citing his moral courage and defense of the people.

In the present, deeply moved by the tale of Amarendra Baahubali, Sivudu and his foster parents eagerly ask to meet him. A dejected Kattappa reveals that Amarendra Baahubali was backstabbed and murdered years ago, and he was the one who killed him.

== Cast ==
- Prabhas in a triple role as
  - Mahendra Baahubali "Sivudu" (Telugu) / "Sivu" (Tamil), Amarendra's son
    - Sathvik Varma as young Sivudu
  - Amarendra Baahubali
    - Nikhil Devadula as young Amarendra Baahubali
  - Maharaja Veerendra Vikramadeva, Amarendra's father and the past king of Mahishmati (photo presence)
- Rana Daggubati as Bhallaladeva (Telugu) / Palvaalthevan (Tamil)
- Anushka Shetty as Devasena (Telugu) / Devasenai (Tamil) (Voiced by Sowmya Sharma)
- Tamannaah Bhatia as Avanthika
- Nassar as Bijjaladeva (Telugu) / Pingalathevan (Tamil)
- Sathyaraj as Karikala Kattappa (Voiced by P. Ravi Shankar)
- Ramya Krishna as Sivagami Devi
- Venkat Prasad as Sivudu's foster father
- Meka Ramakrishna as Jaya Varma, leader of the Kunthala rebels and Devasena's brother
- Subbaraya Sarma
- Scarlett Mellish Wilson as dancer in orange blouse in song "Manohari"
- Nora Fatehi as dancer in green blouse in song "Manohari"
- Raja Babu
- Bharani Shankar
- Charandeep as Kalakeya King's brother
- Pramila Rani
- Kalpa Latha as an inhabitant of Mahishmathi / Magizhmathi
- Rohini Molleti as Sanga, leader of the Amburi tribe and Sivudu's foster mother
- Tanikella Bharani as Swamiji, an Amburi sage devoted to Shiva's prayer
- Adivi Sesh as Bhadrudu (Telugu) / Bhadra (Tamil), Bhallaladeva's adoptive son
- Prabhakar as the King of Kalakeyas (Note: His name is revealed to be Inkoshi in Baahubali: The Lost Legends (2017).)
- Teja Kakumanu as Saketudu (Telugu) / Sahithan (Tamil), a traitor who tells the Kalakeyas information about Mahishmati (Telugu) / Magizhmathi (Tamil)
- Sudeepa as Aslam Khan, an Arabian weapon's dealer who befriends Kattappa.
- Rakesh Varre as Sethupathi
- John Kokken as a Kalakeya
- Chalapathi Rao as a Priest
- Warina Hussain as dancer in blue blouse in song "Manohari"
- S. S. Rajamouli as the spirit seller before the song "Manohari"

== Production ==
I was about 7 years old when I started reading comics called Amar Chitra Katha that are published in India. They're not about a superhero, but they encompass all the stories of India, the folklore, the mythology, everything. But most of these stories are about Indian historical figures. I was fascinated by the forts, the battles, the kings, I not only used to read those stories but I kept telling those stories to my friends in my own way.

— Rajamouli, on the inspiration for making Baahubali.

Baahubali: The Beginning was produced in the Telugu film industry and filmed in both Telugu and Tamil languages simultaneously. Distant shots, however, were only shot in Telugu and dubbed in Tamil. As of July 2015, the film series was considered the most expensive in India.

=== Development ===
Director S. S. Rajamouli revealed that Baahubali is inspired by the epic Mahabharata. V. Vijayendra Prasad, the screenwriter and Rajamouli's father who wrote stories for most of Rajamouli's films, once again penned the story for Baahubali. Vijayendra Prasad revealed that Sivagami has shades of both Kunti and Kaikeyi while Devasena is a warrior like Sita. He further added that he sees Baahubali as the story of Sivagami and Devasena. He was also inspired by tales of Chandamama and Amar Chitra Katha comics.

In February 2011, S. S. Rajamouli announced that Prabhas would star in his upcoming movie. In January 2013, he announced that the working title was Baahubali. Actual film production started at Rock Gardens in Kurnool on 6 July 2013. The waterfall scenes were shot at Athirappilly Falls in Kerala, huge sets for the Mahishmati kingdom were constructed at Ramoji Film City in Hyderabad, and the snow episodes in the film were shot in Bulgaria. The film boasts of one year pre-production work wherein 15,000 storyboard sketches for the film were created—the highest for any Indian Film as of this date. More than 90 percent of the film had visually enhanced shots and, according to the producer, more than 600 VFX artists worked for the film from 18 facilities around the world led by Makuta VFX and Firefly in Hyderabad, Prasad Studios in Hyderabad and Chennai, Annapurna Studios in Hyderabad, Tau Films, and Dancing Digital Animation and Macrograph in South Korea. Makuta VFX which had prior experience of working with S. S. Rajamouli was chosen as principal visual effects studio. The cinematography of the movie was done by KK Senthil Kumar for 380 days using Arri Alexa XT camera with Master Prime lens. This marked Rajamouli's first film using digital imagery.

Most of the film was shot in ArriRaw format in 4:3 aspect ratio while ArriRaw 16.9 was used for slow motion shots at 120 fps. Open Gate format, which can use the full 3.4K sensor in the camera to produce frames larger than the standard ArriRaw format, was tapped in to get the maximum image quality in VFX shots. Production designer Sabu Cyril created 10,000 different kinds of weaponry including swords, helmets and armour required for the soldiers. To make the swords lightweight, carbon-fibre was used instead of steel. 3D printing technology was used to create the head of the 100-foot Bhallaladeva statue in the movie. Flexi foam was used to make lightweight armour with the look of leather. V. Srinivas Mohan was chosen as visual effects supervisor, and Kotagiri Venkateswara Rao was the editor. P. M. Satheesh was the sound designer and Peter Hein was responsible for the action sequences. The costume designers were Rama Rajamouli and Prasanthi Tipirneni. The line producer was M. M. Srivalli.

=== Visual effects ===
National Award winner V. Srinivas Mohan was roped in as Visual effects supervisor for Baahubali. Makuta VFX which is based out of Hyderabad was chosen as principal visual effects studio and was responsible for more than 50% of the computer-generated imagery in the film. The majority of work done by Makuta involved bringing the 1500 foot waterfall to life, creating mountains and landscapes including the kingdom of Mahishmati, with its massive temples and courtyards. Creating the waterfall took nearly two years as Makuta dealt with complexity in fluid dynamics and simulations. Manuka claimed each frame of the waterfall sequence was treated as creating a new set and employed a different set of methodology.

Firefly Creative Studio of Hyderabad worked primarily on the avalanche and the war sequences, which account for nearly 25 minutes of the film. Firefly Creative was also involved in creating underwater VFX shots and in establishing backstories for Kalakeya characters. Tau Films was responsible for creating the CGI bison, while Prasad EFX from Hyderabad was responsible for some shots in pre and post battle episodes involving digital multiplication. Prasad also created a 3D image of Kattappa and mapped his head onto a duplicate actor in one of the scenes.

Srushti VFX from Hyderabad was involved in digitally creating some of the shots in the war sequence along with Firefly Studios. Annapurna Studios from Hyderabad was chosen as digital intermediate partner for the film which is responsible for generating the digital feed with the best colour and audio for editing. For the first time in Indian movies, Academy Color Encoding System workflows were implemented along with Infinitely Scalable Information Storage keeping in mind the scale of digitally enhanced shots in the film. Arka Media Works, production company of Baahubali, teamed up with AMD to use the state of the art FirePro GPUs W9100 and W8100 during post production.

In an interview with Quartz, the co-founder of Makuta VFX stated, "Most of Baahubali was developed in Hyderabad, home to Tollywood, and used local talent. It was principally a homegrown feature produced by homegrown talent."

=== Kiliki language ===
The fictional language Kiliki (also referred to as Kilikili) spoken by the Kalakeyas, a ferocious warrior tribe, was created by Madhan Karky for the film. It is said to be the first fictional language to be created for Indian film.

While Karky was pursuing a PhD in Australia, he took up a part-time job of teaching and baby-sitting children. During one such interaction, he thought it would be fun to create a new language that could be easily grasped. Basic words were first made up and opposites were represented by word reversals – me was min and you was nim. The language, with 100 words, was called "Click" to highlight its simplicity. This formed the foundation for Kiliki.

- Kilikili consists of at least 750 words and more than 40 concrete grammar rules.
- It was designed to be an intuitive language: Karky said he used hard consonants and soft consonants depending on the nature of the words' meanings.
- The language was created keeping in mind that the Kalakeya warriors had to be portrayed as terrifying brutes.

On 21 February 2020, on the occasion of International Mother Language Day, Rajamouli launched the official website of Kiliki language. He called the language as "world's youngest and easiest language."

== Music ==
Rajamouli's cousin M. M. Keeravani composed the music and background score for this film and the sound supervision was done by Kalyani Malik. The Telugu version of the soundtrack album was released on 31 May 2015, at the Sri Venkateswara University Grounds. The album of the film's Tamil version was released on 7 June 2015, while the soundtrack of the Hindi and Malayalam versions, were released on 21 June and 1 July respectively.

== Release ==
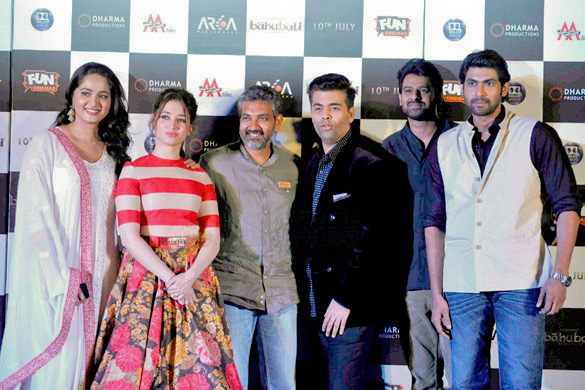
The cast of Baahubali, with director Rajamouli and Karan Johar at the trailer launch of the film

=== Screenings and statistics ===
The film was released on 10 July 2015 in 4,000 screens worldwide in Telugu, Tamil, Hindi and Malayalam languages. A record number of 1600 screens in Telugu, 1500 screens in Hindi, 350 in Tamil and 225 screens in Malayalam were booked for the release. The film was released in the USA a day earlier by BlueSky Cinemas in 135 screens. A premier show was also held on 9 July at Prasads IMAX Hyderabad. The film's release in Kerala was hindered by the shutdown of a number of theatres due to the piracy issue of the Malayalm film Premam and released in only a few theatres. The international version of the film (20 minutes shorter than the original one) was screened at Busan International Film Festival. Producers announced plans to release the film in China in November 2015 by E Stars Films. The producer, Shobu Yarlagadda, revealed his plans to release the movie in Latin America, Germany and European countries. Arka International made arrangements to release the movie in Germany and 70 other territories.

As the sequel Baahubali 2: The Conclusion was released on 28 April 2017, the producers and distributors re-released the first part (Hindi) on 7 April 2017. The film was screened at various film festivals like Open Cinema Strand of Busan International Film Festival, Indian Film Festival The Hague, Sitges Film Festival in Spain, Utopiales Film Festival in France, Golden Horse Film Festival in Taipei, Taiwan, Tallinn Black Nights Film Festival in Estonia, L'Etrange International Film Festival in Paris, Five Flavours Film Festival in Poland, Hawaii International Film Festival in Honolulu, Brussels International Fantastic Film Festival in Belgium, Cannes Film Festival in France, Transilvania International Film Festival in Romania, Grand Rex in Paris, Kurja Polt Horror Film Festival, Festival de Lacamo, 8th BRICS summit, and the 2016 Indian Panorama section of the International Film Festival of India, Goa. The international version of the film was released in China, Japan, Korea, Taiwan, Indonesia, Thailand, Vietnam, Laos, Cambodia, Myanmar, Philippines, Timor-Leste, and some European and Latin American countries.

=== Marketing ===
Baahubali: The Beginning was marketed by a Mumbai-based company named Spice PR owned by Prabhat Choudhary, who coined the catchphrase "Kattappa ne Baahubali ko kyun maara?" ("Why did Kattappa kill Baahubali?"). Marketing of the film started two years before the shoot by S. S. Rajamouli with the audition campaign on Facebook and YouTube. A number of short promotional behind-the-scenes videos were released on ArkaMediaworks YouTube channel and the team unveiled first look posters and videos featuring the film's lead stars on the occasions of their birthdays. The film used an augmented reality application to play the trailer on smart phones and tablets. The crown used by the character of Baahubali in the film was exhibited at Comic Con, Hyderabad, as a part of the film's promotion. A cosplay event was held in which chosen winners were given a chance to visit the sets of the film. On 22 July 2015, Guinness World Records approved the poster created during the audio launch of Baahubali in Kochi on 1 July 2015 as the world's largest poster. The poster has an area of 4,793.65 m^{2} (51,598.21 ft^{2}) and it was created by Global United Media Company Pvt Ltd. This record was later broken by a 5,969.61 m2 poster for the film MSG-2 The Messenger.

Producers announced plans to create a film museum at Ramoji Film City in Hyderabad to showcase the weapons, armour, and costumes used by actors in the film. The museum would be the first of its kind for any Indian movie. The film's website hosts merchandise which includes apparel, accessories, and film collectibles.

=== Distribution ===
In early July 2014, for the first part of the film, the region distribution rights for Karnataka and Ceded (Rayalaseema) were sold to a distributor for ₹230 million (US$3.59 million). Though he did not confirm the price, Dil Raju said in an interview to Deccan Chronicle that he purchased the first part's Nizam region rights and added that he would acquire the rights of the second part also for this region.

The Telugu version of the film was presented by K. Raghavendra Rao, Tamil version by K.E. Gnanavel Raja, Sri Thenandal Films and UV Creations, Karan Johar presented the Hindi version. MVP Entertainment is set to release the movie in Thailand, Vietnam, Laos, Cambodia, Myanmar, and Timor-Leste countries. Sun Distribution acquired the distribution rights of the movie in Latin American countries while Creative Century Entertainment got the rights for Taiwan. In Korea, the movie is scheduled to be released via Entermode Corp.

=== Controversy ===
The Tamil version of the film faced a controversy relating to a word used in the film. On 22 July 2015, activists of Dalit group Puratchi Pulikal Iyakkam hurled petrol bombs outside the 'Tamil, Jaya' multiplex in Madurai screening the Tamil version of the film. The Dalit group Puratchi Pulikal Iyakkam protested against the movie over the inclusion of the word 'pagadai' (gambler). Members of the group claimed the words, used by caste Hindus to address members of the Arunthathiyar Dalit sub-caste, are considered derogatory against Dalits. Dialogue writer of Tamil version, Madhan Karky issued an apology for offending Dalits.

=== Home media ===
Arka Media Works gave the satellite rights to Star Maa and the Malayalam dubbed version was also given the satellite rights to Mazhavil Manorama. The Tamil version was given to Jaya TV. The Kannada dubbed version was given to Colors Kannada. The Hindi dubbed version was given the satellite rights to Sony Max. The Odia dubbed version of this movie was given to Zee Sarthak. The Bhojpuri dubbed version of the movie was later given to Bhojpuri Cinema TV. The Marathi dubbed version of this movie was given to Shemaroo Marathibana. The Bengali dubbed version of this movie was given to Enterr10 Bangla.

Netflix acquired the digital rights for streaming all languages of the film.

== Reception ==
=== Critical response ===
On the review aggregator website Rotten Tomatoes, 91% of 22 critics' reviews are positive, with an average rating of 7.1/10.

==== India ====
Deepanjana Pal of Firstpost called it "Rajamouli's tour de force", terming it as "elaborate, well-choreographed and [having] some breathtaking moments." Prabhas and Daggubati are both in their elements as the warriors who approach warfare in two distinctive styles. The outcome of the battle is no surprise, but there are enough clever tactics and twists to keep the audience hooked. The biggest surprise, however, lies in the film's final shot, which gives you a glimpse into the sequel that will come out next year." Saibal Chatterjee of NDTV India rated the film with three stars out of five and stated, "The spectacular universe that the film conjures up is filled with magic, but the larger-than-life characters that populate its extraordinary expanse do not belong to any known mythic landscape. To that extent, Baahubali, driven by the titular superhero who pulls off mind-boggling feats both in love and in war, throws up many a surprise that isn't altogether meaningless."

Shubhra Gupta of The Indian Express praised the film: "Right from its opening frames, Baahubali holds out many promises: of adventure and romance, love and betrayal, valour and weakness. And it delivers magnificently on each of them. This is full-tilt, fully-assured filmmaking of a very high order. Baahubali is simply spectacular." In her review for The Hindu, Sangeetha Devi Dundoo wrote, "The war formations that form a chunk of the latter portions of the film are the best we've seen in Indian cinema so far. These portions are spectacular and show the technical finesse of the cinematographer (K.K. Senthil Kumar) and the visual effects teams. The waterfall, the mystical forests and water bodies above the cliffs and the lead pair escaping an avalanche all add to the spectacle. Give into its magic, without drawing comparisons to Hollywood flicks."

Sukanya Varma of Rediff gave the film four out of five stars, calling it "mega, ingenious and envelope pushing!" Rachit Gupta of Filmfare gave the film four stars (out of 5) and summarised, "Baahubali is truly an epic experience. Had the story not been so jaded, this would've gone into the history books as an all-time classic. But that's not the case. It has its set of storytelling flaws, but even those are overshadowed by Rajamouli's ideas and execution. This is definitely worthy of being India's most expensive film. It's a definite movie watching experience."

Suparna Sharma of Deccan Chronicle praised the second half of the film, writing, "Rajamouli has reserved all the grander and grandstanding for later, after interval. That's when the film stands up and begins to strut like an epic." Suhani Singh of India Today pointed out that the film is best enjoyed keeping logic at bay. She added, "SS Rajamouli and his team put up a fascinating wild, wild east adventure. It takes pluck to conceive a world like the one seen in Baahubali and to pull it off on a level which is on par with the international standards. The almost 45-minute-long battle sequence at the end is not just one of the biggest climaxes, but also the action spectacle rarely seen in Indian cinema. And if Rajamouli can present another one like that in part 2, then he is on course to register his name in cinema's history books. We can't wait to revisit Mahishmati kingdom."

Critical reception penned by Shubha Shetty Saha for Mid-Day rates the film with four stars out of five, exclaiming, "While watching Baahubali, you might have to periodically pick up your jaw off the floor. Because this is not merely a movie, it is an unbelievably thrilling fantasy ride." The review extends praising the aspects, "It is to the director's credit that every aspect of the film – action, mind-boggling set design and choreography – lives up to this epic film of gigantic scale. The choreography in the song that has Shiva disrobing Avantika to get her in touch with her feminine side, is an absolute gem."

==== International ====
Critics praised the film for its direction, technical values, and the actors' performances. Lisa Tsering based on The Hollywood Reporter wrote, "The story has been told many times before – a child is born destined for greatness and as a man vanquishes the forces of evil – but in the confident hands of accomplished South Indian director S.S. Rajamouli the tale gets potent new life in Baahubali: The Beginning." Allan Hunter, writing for Screen Daily noted that "The broad brushstrokes storytelling and the director's over-fondness for slow-motion sequences are among the film's failings but this is still a rousing film, easily accessible epic. There's rarely a dull moment in Baahubali: The Beginning, part one of a gung-ho, crowd-pleasing Telugu-language epic that has been shattering box-office records throughout India."

Mike McCahill of The Guardian rated the film four stars out of five, praising the film, "Rajamouli defers on the latter for now, but his skilful choreography of these elements shucks off any cynicism one might carry into Screen 1: wide-eyed and wondrous, his film could be a blockbuster reboot, or the first blockbuster ever made, a reinvigoration of archetypes that is always entertaining, and often thrilling, to behold." Suprateek Chatterjee of The Huffington Post wrote, "However, all said and done, Baahubali: The Beginning is a remarkable achievement. What Rajamouli has pulled off here, despite its flaws, is nothing short of a miracle, especially when you take into account India's notoriously risk-averse filmmaking environment and when the film ends on a tantalizing cliffhanger (paving the way for Baahubali: The Conclusion, due to release next year), one can't help but applaud his singularly brave vision. As the cliché goes, a journey of a thousand miles must begin with a single step, but it doesn't really matter if that first step is shaky as long as it lands firmly and confidently."

In 2026, The Guardian ranked Baahubali as the second best mythological film of all time, tied with its sequel Baahubali 2.

=== Box office ===
Baahubali: The Beginning collected ₹15 crore (US$2.34 million) from the United States on its first day. First weekend collections stood around ₹165.1 crore (US$25.74 million) worldwide from all its versions, the biggest ever for an Indian film in India & the fourth biggest ever for an Indian film worldwide. The film grossed around ₹263 crore (US$41 million) worldwide in the first week of its release. It became the first South Indian film to gross ₹300 crore (US$46.76 million) worldwide, reaching there in 9 days, and subsequently grossed ₹391.2 crore (US$60.98 million) worldwide in 15 days. Baahubali: The Beginning netted ₹420.05 crore in India. Firstpost later reported that the total collections stood at ₹650 crore as of August 2017. Baahubali: The Beginning grossed ₹511.35 crore (US$79.71 million) in all languages in India alone, and became the highest-grossing film in India, surpassing PK's gross of ₹440 crore (US$68.59 million) from India. By the end of its 87-day run, Bahubali collected 586.45 crore (US$79 million) worldwide in its initial theatrical run.

The Beginning opened to 100 percent occupancy in Andhra Pradesh and Telangana and close to 70 percent occupancy in Tamil Nadu, Kerala and Karnataka. It grossed around ₹50 crore (US$7.79 million) on its first day of release in India from all four versions (Telugu, Tamil, Malayalam and Hindi). The Hindi version earned around ₹5.15 crore (US$802,782.15) nett which was the highest opening for any film dubbed into Hindi. Baahubali grossed ₹50 crore (US$7.79 million) on the first day in India. The Hindi version grossed around ₹24 crore (US$3.74 million) nett in the first weekend.

The Telugu version alone earned around ₹66.5 crore (US$10.37 million) nett in first weekend in India. The film, from all its versions, earned almost ₹105.7 crore (US$16.48 million) nett in its first weekend. It had the biggest opening weekend ever in India. The Hindi version collected around ₹48 crore (US$7.48 million) nett in its first week. Baahubali: The Beginning grossed more than ₹185.3 crore (US$28.88 million) nett from all its versions in India in the first week. It added a further ₹47.8 crore (US$7.45 million) nett in its second weekend to take its total to around ₹233.1 crore (US$36.34 million) nett in ten days. The Hindi version grossed over ₹39.5 crore (US$6.16 million) nett in the Mumbai circuit.

The film collected around ₹20 crore (US$3.12 million) in its first day from the international markets. The film opened on the ninth spot for its weekend, collecting around US$3.5 million with a per-screen average of $15,148. The film debuted in the ninth position for the US and Canadian box office collecting $4,630,000 for three days and $3,250,000 for the weekend of 10–12 July 2015. Baahubali: The Beginning grossed £66,659 from its Telugu version in United Kingdom and Ireland and A$194,405 from its Tamil version in Australia in until its second weekend (17 – 19 July 2015). The film also grossed MYR 663,869 in Malaysia from its Tamil version. The film grossed US$540,000 on its opening weekend in China. It has grossed a total of CN¥7.49 million(₹77.8 million) in the country. The film totally earned $10.94 million at the overseas box office.

== Accolades ==
At the 63rd National Film Awards, Baahubali: The Beginning won the Best Feature Film, becoming the first Telugu film to win the award, and Best Special Effects. At the 63rd Filmfare Awards South, the Telugu version won five awards from ten nominations, including Best Film, Best Director for Rajamouli and Best Supporting Actress for Ramya Krishna respectively. Both the Tamil and Telugu versions won several awards in their respective categories, including Best Film, Best Director for Rajamouli, and Best Supporting Actress for Ramya Krishna at the 1st IIFA Utsavam. Baahubali: The Beginning became the first Indian film to be nominated for Saturn Awards, receiving five nominations at the 42nd ceremony, including Best Fantasy Film and Best Supporting Actress for Tamannaah Bhatia.

== Legacy ==
Baahubali: The Beginning is one of the films featured in BBC's documentary on 100 Years of Indian Cinema directed by Sanjeev Bhaskar. Post the success of the film, a film movement was started, i.e. Pan-Indian films.

In 2016, Thagubothu Ramesh plays a character named Kattappa in Selfie Raja. In 2017, Kattappava Kanom (transl. Kattappa is missing), which was named after the character of Kattappa from the film, was released. In 2018, Netflix announced that they had ordered a streaming television prequel series called Baahubali: Before the Beginning. Sathyaraj is referred to as Kattappa in a scene from Kanaa (2018).
