= Don't Trouble the Trouble =

2026 Indian Telugu language fantasy film

- Theatrical release poster
- Directed by: Shashank Yeleti
- Written by: Shashank Yeleti; Hamza Ali
- Produced by: S. S. Karthikeya; Shobu Yarlagadda; Prasad Devineni
- Starring: Fahadh Faasil; Ssara Palekar; Saurabh Sachdeva
- Cinematography: Brad Francis
- Edited by: Praveen Antony
- Music by: Kaala Bhairava
- Production companies: Showing Business; Arka Media Works
- Release date: 2 October 2026
- Running time: 156 minutes
- Country: India
- Language: Telugu

Don't Trouble the Trouble is a 2026 Indian Telugu-language fantasy film directed by Shashank Yeleti and starring Fahadh Faasil, Ssara Palekar and Saurabh Sachdeva. The film is presented by S. S. Rajamouli and produced by S. S. Karthikeya, Shobu Yarlagadda and Prasad Devineni, under Showing Business and Arka Media Works, respectively. It marks Fahadh Faasil's debut as the primary lead in Telugu cinema.

== Plot ==
Suri, an orphan who works as an ambulance driver, gets into trouble with Mohammed Singh Aslam and his gang and is forced to raise ₹25 lakh. He plans to kidnap a wealthy family's child for ransom, but his plan takes an unexpected turn when he meets Divya, a young girl who claims to have made her parents disappear. Suri takes Divya and her dog Snoopy with him, and lies to Divya, saying that he is a magician and he can bring her parents back.

Suri first extorts Divya's uncle Pratap to give ₹1 crore to get Divya back. He first brings Divya into a maze and sits her on a yellow bench next to the exit, telling her to close her eyes and count to 100, and calls Pratap, telling him to come to the yellow bench and get Divya after putting the ₹1 crore in the middle of the maze. Suri then puts on a mask makes all the other undercover officers hug a toy and repeatedly say "I love you". He then steals the walkie talkie from one of the officers while jokingly replying "Love you too". Pratap goes to the yellow bench and finds nobody, accusing Suri of disinforming him. Suri, now with the walkie talkie, unbeknownst to Divya being a spirit only he can see, reassures him that Divya is sitting on the yellow bench. A performer in a kids show catches his bag with the ₹1 crore inside with a stick, and teases him by swinging the bag side-to-side with the stick. As Suri is doing this, the officers notice him and chase him, but Suri escapes. He goes somewhere else, and Divya finally finds him, accusing him of abandoning her and saying she had to count to 150 instead of 100.

Suri then brings Divya to a train station, and calls Pratap once again, telling him to come. Pratap comes and boards a train, which Suri is also on. He then gives him the ₹1 crore on the train and they reach the station Divya is in. Snoopy, who was left in the car, jumps out of the car and runs into the train station, trying to find Suri. Multiple staff members notice Snoopy and chase him. Snoppy then runs into an enclosure of boxes, and the staff surround him. Divya, angry at the staff, shouts at the staff to stop and runs to Snoopy. Unexpectedly, she starts floating, and she uses her powers to blow them off. She then starts running to Snoopy. On the train, Suri noticed Divya running, however, Pratap cannot see Divya. Pratap then attacks Suri and attempts to take off his mask, successfully doing so. They continue fighting.

Suri then notices Divya's powers and becomes afraid of her. After escaping, he scolds Divya for running away, in which he tries slapping her, but his hand slips through her, baffling him and making him slip and fall down the stairs. Divya notices him and asks if he is okay, but Suri gets startled and plays dead. Divya then screams for help, unbeknownst that she is a ghost. As Divya looks away, Suri stops playing dead. He then finds out while looking through a mirror on the other side that Divya is only visible to him and Snoopy. He then goes into a spirit medium's house, telling Divya that the medium is a magician and can help Divya's parents reappear, pleading him to look into what is making only him and Snoopy see Divya. After the medium says that Suri should use Divya like how an owner uses their genie, he repeatedly hits Suri. Divya, who entered and now notices the medium hitting Suri, uses her powers once again and makes the medium fall onto the ground and become unconscious.

Suri, now afraid again, runs away and goes into a temple, praying to take Divya away. Divya then calls for Suri and Suri goes out. Suri becomes afraid, angering Divya. Divya starts floating, making Suri more afraid, and he pleads Divya to not hurt him.

Suri then talks to Divya, and finally realises that Divya is a spirit. He also tells Divya that Aslam is a child kidnapper who kidnaps for money, hoping to use Divya to scare Aslam off, and Divya says they must ask Aslam for the money and kids and Aslam will give it back. Suri then reminds Divya that Aslam will not just give the money back like that, and that they must fight. Suri then pretends to make Divya invisible and tells Divya that only she can be seen and heard by him and Snoopy.

In Aslam's place, they are having a celebration, and Aslam's gang members are drinking. Suri and Divya enter, and Suri gives a bag, claiming it is ₹1 crore, but as a gang member opens it, Snoopy jumps out. This makes the gang member attack Suri, making Divya angry and use her powers. Suri reminds Divya that she must only use her powers when he says "Abracadabra".

After the fight, Suri, Divya and Snoopy enter a temple, and Suri tells Divya to stay with Snoopy in the temple, since he has to save the kids Aslam kidnapped. After trying Snoopy up, he leaves.

When driving with Mallesh, his friend who is an actual magician, Suri and Mallesh get arrested for child kidnapping and brought into the police station. Mallesh, not knowing what Suri did, tries telling the police that he did nothing, but fails in trying to be let free.

In the police station, Pratap interrogates Suri, trying to find where Divya and her parents are. Suri, after many questions, finally confesses that the Divya he saw was a spirit. Pratap, shocked, starts beating Suri. Divya, who has now entered the police station and hears Suri's yelps of pain, goes to the room Suri is in to see her uncle Pratap beating him. Divya starts crying and pleads to Pratap to stop beating Suri and that she knows where her parents are, before realising that she can't be heard by Pratap. She then asks Suri to make her visible again, and Suri falls unconscious as Pratap is taken away. After regaining consciousness, Suri confesses to Divya that she actually died and that she currently is a spirit who only he and Snoopy can see.

Divya then remembers how she died; Divya was in the car with her parents and her mother didn't let her keep the sunroof open. This angers her and makes her threaten to make her parents disappear. She then says "Abracadabra, make my mum and dad disappear!" which makes her parents turn to see her, including her dad, who is driving. A car hits their car, making Divya fly out of the window and die.

After Divya leaves, Mallesh asks him what is going on, accusing him of being dramatic. Suri explains what is going on and realises that Divya's parents might be alive. Suri unwraps the cloth binding his hands together, and then unwraps Mallesh's, and then fights an officer and leaves to find Divya. After finding Divya, Suri realised he had a bracelet Divya wore, which let him see her.

Suri asks Divya about where the crash was, and she said it was near a sign that said "Vikrabad - 23". Not long after, they locate it and find Divya's mum and dad. Suri uses a rope tied round a tree to go down a cliff and get Divya's parents. Suri says Divya's mum should be brought up first since, as we find out later, she's pregnant, but Divya's mum says Divya's dad should be brought up first instead. As Suri is doing CPR to Divya's dad, he is shot by Pratap. Divya uses her powers, and then Pratap notices Suri getting oxygen for Divya's dad, and he finally notices he is now trying to save Divya's parents. Suri goes down to get Divya's mum, but realises she has gone into labor. Suri makes a makeshift platform and ties it to the rope. The officers bring a medical team to assist Divya's mum giving birth. After that, he notices the officers bringing the rope back down to bring him up, and he talks to Divya. He realises he can finally touch Divya and hugs her, and Mallesh realises that Suri has died and has gone unconscious.

Six months later, Mallesh is doing a kids magic show for a group of children. He is about to do another trick, but a kid goes to Mallesh and says that he should do "the other trick". The kids hold hands and go into lines of six, and then start floating wind under. It is then shown that Suri and Divya are spirits and are using their powers from behind Mallesh to make the kids float.

== Cast ==
- Fahadh Faasil as Suri
- Ssara Palekar as Divya
- Saurabh Sachdeva as Prathap
- Divya Pillai as Pallavi
- Mahesh Manjrekar as Aslam Bhai
- Subbaraju as SI Krishna
- Venkatesh Kakumanu as Mallesh, Suri’s friend
- Rohith Pathak as Jaggu, Aslam Bhai’s right-hand man
- Surabhi Prabhavathi as Mallesh’s mother
- Vasu Inturi as Dr. Dinesh

== Production ==
=== Development ===
The film was announced in March 2024 as one of two projects featuring Fahadh Faasil produced by S. S. Karthikeya in association with Arka Media Works. Shashank Yeleti was announced as the director, with S. S. Rajamouli as presenter. The film is Fahadh Faasil's first Telugu film as a solo lead.

Principal photography began in October 2025. The film's cinematography is handled by Brad Francis, and the editing is by Praveen Antony. Hamza Ali is the co-writer and the script development is done by S. S. Kanchi.

=== Music ===
The film's music and background score were composed by Kaala Bhairava. The first song, "Cakeu Walku", written by Kaala Bhairava and M. C. Hari was released in August 2026.

== Release ==
The first teaser was released in July 2026. Official trailer was released in Telugu, Malayalam and Tamil languages on 22 September 2026. Mohanlal lent his voice to the Malayalam version, Kamal Haasan to the Tamil version, and Nandamuri Balakrishna to the Telugu version.

The theatrical release initially scheduled on 11 September 2026 was postponed to 2 October 2026.

The film was released theatrically on 2 October 2026, with Telugu as the original language and dubbed versions in Malayalam and Tamil. Distribution in Kerala was handled by Bhavana Release (a division of Bhavana Studios).

== Reception ==
Sangeetha Devi Dundoo of The Hindu described the film as an easy watch aimed at children and adults, praising its humorous moments and lead trio while noted that it's dull narrative stretches and repetitive magic sequences kept it from reaching its full potential. Sreelakshmi Rajan of Mathrubhumi wrote that the film combines fantasy, mystery, humour and emotion, using magic as a backdrop for an emotional relationship rather than focusing on creating an elaborate fantasy world.

Giving the film 3 out of 5, Shreya Varanasi of The Times of India praised its first half for its situational comedy and playful use of fantasy elements, as well as Fahadh Faasil and Ssara Palekar's performances. She felt that the film under performed in the second half, and found the climax overly prolonged despite providing an emotional payoff, and suggested that tighter editing could have improved the film.
