= Panjaa =

2011 film directed by Vishnuvardhan

- Theatrical release poster
- Directed by: Vishnuvardhan
- Screenplay by: Vishnuvardhan
- Dialogues by: Abburi Ravi
- Story by: Vishnuvardhan
- Produced by: Shobu Yarlagadda; Prasad Devineni; Neelima Tirumalasetty; Nagesh Muntha
- Starring: Pawan Kalyan; Sarah-Jane Dias; Anjali Lavania; Jackie Shroff; Adivi Sesh; Atul Kulkarni; Sampath Raj
- Cinematography: P. S. Vinod
- Edited by: A. Sreekar Prasad
- Music by: Yuvan Shankar Raja
- Production companies: Arka Media Works; Sanghamitra Arts Productions
- Distributed by: Sri Venkateswara Creations
- Release date: 9 December 2011
- Running time: 156 minutes
- Country: India
- Language: Telugu
- Budget: est.₹33 crore
- Box office: ₹32.1 crore ₹5.12 crore (Re-Release)

Panjaa (transl. Claw) is a 2011 Indian Telugu-language action thriller film directed by Vishnuvardhan (in his Telugu film directorial debut), produced by Arka Media Works and Sanghamitra Art Productions. The film stars Pawan Kalyan, Sarah-Jane Dias, Anjali Lavania, Jackie Shroff, Adivi Sesh, Atul Kulkarni, Sampath Raj, Subbaraju and Tanikella Bharani. The plot centers around Jai, a loyal henchman for a gangster, who is forced to go on the run after a botched mission leads him to kill his boss's son in response to a violent atrocity.

The film features music scored by Yuvan Shankar Raja and cinematography by P. S. Vinod. Principal photography of the film commenced on 6 May 2011. The filming took place primarily at Kolkata, Pollachi, Karaikudi, Vagamon and Palasa.

Panjaa was released theatrically on 9 December 2011 to mixed reviews from critics. Despite its moderate success internationally, it struggled to make a significant impact at the domestic box office and flopped. Over time, the film was reevaluated and gained a cult following in Telugu cinema.

== Plot ==
Jai is a Kolkata-based hitman working for a don named Bhagavan, and they together share a business rivalry with Kulkarni. Bhagavan's psychotic son, Munna, returns to India after 8 years.

Apart from his gangster life, Jai also owns a nursery where he raises a variety of plants along with his friend, Chotu. He also appoints a caretaker for the nursery, Sandhya. He soon starts hanging out frequently with Sandhya trying to keep his criminal life from her as he develops feelings for her. One day, Munna mistreats his father's accountant and confidant, Sabapathy, and humiliates him by urinating on him in front of the latter's neighbors. Receiving no support from Bhagavan, Sabapathy joins Kulkarni's gang, making Bhagavan order Jai to kill him. As per the plan, Jai kidnaps Rahul, the son of Kulkarni's younger brother, Sampath. He asks Guruvayya to hold Rahul hostage at a club until he is back with Sabapathy. He demands a meeting with Sabapathy in exchange for Rahul's freedom. Sabapathy tells him that he switched sides not to retaliate, but to protect himself. Munna, on the other hand, visits the club and is attracted to the club dancer, Jhanvi, who is also Jai's childhood friend, and inquires about her in the club. Learning from Guruvayya that she loves Jai, Munna is enraged and kills Rahul after he teases him for being an incel and kills Kulkarni's henchman, who came to pick up Rahul.

When Sampath and Kulkarni receive no response from Guruvayya, Jai tries to escape, and a chase ensues. He manages to flee but is shocked to learn of Rahul's death. Munna finds Jahnavi at Jai's house and beats her to death. Jai arrives and gets into a fight with Munna. Guruvayya sees Jai kill Munna and reports him to Bhagavan. Jai decides to tell Bhagavan the reason behind killing Munna, and as he is on his way, he is attacked by Bhagavan's men, as per his orders. Following a gunfight, Jai escapes while Bhagavan vows to seek revenge for Munna's death. Jai escapes to Palasa, where he stays at Sandhya's house. On the other hand, the rivalry between Bhagavan and Kulkarni intensifies after Jai's exit as Bhagavan loses power and his trusted men join hands with Kulkarni. Bhagavan learns about Jai's nursery he used to run with the help of Chotu, and gets it destroyed by his men.

Back at Palasa, local goons invade Sandhya's house at night, where her elder brother, Ashok, and Jai fight them off, following which Sandhya reveals about a mercenary named Sambasiva, who was after her life since she sent him to prison. Jai kills Sambasiva and gives the credit to a local cop named Paparayudu. Bhagavan learns about Chotu's location through his girlfriend, kills her, and captures Chotu. He finds out about Jai and Sandhya through a photo from his phone. When Chotu refuses to tell anything about Jai, Bhagavan gets him asphyxiated. Jai reveals to Sandhya that he was the one who killed Sambasiva for her, further revealing about his past. He is soon attacked by Sampath and his henchmen, but Ashok arrives to his rescue. Following a gunfight and brawl, Jai kills Sampath and learns Sandhya has been kidnapped. He goes back to Kolkata and attacks Kulkarni's house, where he kills his henchmen and holds Kulkarni at gunpoint. Kulkarni tells him he was not the one that kidnapped Sandhya, but Guruvayya who told them about his location in Andhra Pradesh.

Jai proceeds to first kill Kulkarni and then Guruvayya, following which he arrives at Bhagavan's house and finds Sandhya captive. He reveals why he killed Munna and tries to convince Bhagavan into sparing Sandhya. However, Bhagavan ends up shooting her, and he ends up fatally shooting Bhagavan. Sandhya survives and unites with Jai, but Bhagavan dies from his injuries.

== Cast ==
- Pawan Kalyan as Jai
- Sarah-Jane Dias as Sandhya
- Anjali Lavania as Jahnavi
- Jackie Shroff as Bhagawan
- Adivi Sesh as Munna, Bhagawan's son
- Atul Kulkarni as Kulkarni
- Brahmanandam as M. Paparayudu
- Tanikella Bharani as Guruvayya
- Ali as Chotu
- Subbaraju as Ashok, Sandhya's brother
- Sampath Raj as Sampath, Kulkarni's brother
- Amit Tiwari as Kulkarni's henchman
- Paruchuri Venkateswara Rao as Sabhapathy
- Surekha Vani as Jai's mother
- Jhansi as Lakshmi
- Kishori Ballal as Sandhya's grandmother

== Production ==
=== Development ===
In November 2010, sources reported that director Vishnuvardhan would direct a film featuring Pawan Kalyan in the lead role, to be produced by Neelima Nagesh and Shobu Yarlagadda. Neelima, in an interview, stated that she was a big fan of Pawan Kalyan. Vishnnuvardhan, following the release of his 2009 film Sarvam, which fared poorly at the box office, had been working on two scripts – the other one being the prequel to the 2007 version of Billa – but was unable to start either project due to unavailable dates of Pawan Kalyan and Ajith Kumar. He had planned to shoot both projects simultaneously from March 2011 onwards, but since that was not possible, he was forced to drop one of the projects, with Vishnuvardhan eventually deciding to direct this film. Abburi Ravi was roped in to write the dialogues, while the screenplay was provided by Rahul Koda.

=== Casting ===
Former Miss India Sarah-Jane Dias was signed for one of the two female lead characters, making her Telugu film debut. Jiah Khan and Shazahn Padamsee, who starred in Orange opposite Ram Charan Tej, were considered for the other female role. However, eventually Mumbai-based model Anjali Lavania, best known for her appearances in the Kingfisher calendar and several other advertisements, was finalised for the second character. Director-actor Sesh Adivi was roped in for an antagonist role. Yuvan Shankar Raja and A. Sreekar Prasad, Vishnuvardhan's norm associates, were signed to score the music and handle the editing department, respectively, while P. S. Vinod was selected as the cinematographer in place of Nirav Shah who had worked on Vishnuvardhan's previous projects. Action sequences were choreographed by Sham Kaushal, a noted stunt co-ordinator in Bollywood films, while Sunil Babu was chosen as the art director. Vishnuvardhan's wife, Anu Vardhan, worked as the costume designer.

=== Filming ===
Principal photography was expected to start from 15 April 2011, with the scenes during the first schedule being shot in Kolkata, West Bengal. Filming eventually began on 6 May in Kolkata, where the major part of the film was shot. The Kolkata schedule was completed by late June 2011, and the following month, filming was held in Pollachi, Tamil Nadu, which was followed by schedules in Karaikudi, Tamil Nadu and across Kerala. In Kerala, the crew shot for five days at the Vagamon hill station, located 1,100 metres above sea level. A song sequence featuring Pawan Kalyan and Sarah Jane was shot at the Ramoji Film City in Hyderabad in September under the choreography of Firoz Khan. From 10 October, the last song picturised on Anjali Lavania was canned in a Hyderabad studio. Anjali performed belly dance in the song, which was choreographed by Geeta Kapoor, best known for her work in the song Sheila Ki Jawani from the Hindi film Tees Maar Khan.

The film was launched under the working title The Shadow, with the team indicating that the title may be changed. The film, began its principal photography in early May 2011, which was completed by October 2011, with filming being held primarily at Kolkata, West Bengal, Pollachi and Karaikudi in Tamil Nadu and Vagamon in Kerala apart from Palasa. In the following months, several titles including Kaali, Thilak, Power and Patel, were considered. The official title was revealed as Panjaa by the producers during Dussera.

== Soundtrack ==
For the film's score and soundtrack, Vishnuvardhan's friend and usual associate, Yuvan Shankar Raja, was signed up. Panjaa's soundtrack features six tracks. Chandrabose and Ramajogayya Sastry penned the lyrics for every three songs. The audio launch was held on 18 November 2011 in a grand manner at the Gachibowli Indoor Stadium in Hyderabad. The event was broadcast live on MAA TV.

== Marketing and release ==
Prior to its release, the film's official merchandise was made available on the official site, including a game application. 15% of the merchandise sales were donated to major NGOs. An anti-piracy initiative was also launched through the site itself. The film's official merchandise was also released across Andhra Pradesh. A teaser trailer was released a day prior to Diwali, which received a high response. According to Sify, it was seen more than 200,000 times on the film's official YouTube channel within 24 hours, setting a new record.

In order to prevent any major cuts, the makers accepted the A (adults only) rating from the Central Board of Film Certification for their release in India, while they actually wanted the U/A (parental guidance) rating. The film was released on 9 December 2011 with six cuts. Following multiple fan requests, the makers added the title track in the beginning as well, while it initially played only during the end.

In 2012, the film was released on DVD and Blu-ray formats by Bhavani DVD. The same year, a Tamil-dubbed version titled Kuri (transl. Mark) was also scheduled to release, but the plan was later on dropped. In 2015, a Hindi-dubbed version titled Jaandaar (transl. Brave) was released. The film was also dubbed in Malayalam as Paayum.

== Re-Release ==
Panjaa is set to re-release worldwide on September 2, 2026, coinciding with Pawan Kalyan's 55th birthday.

== Reception ==
=== Critical reception ===
Panjaa received mixed reviews, from the critics. Idlebrain.com also gave it 3 stars out of 5, similarly praising the action sequences and performances apart from technical aspects, but criticized the lack of emotions. News18 praised the film's art work and styling, but criticized the narration pace.

On the other hand, Rediff gave 2 stars, criticizing the script and pointing out that it reminded of Kalyan's earlier film Balu ABCDEFG but praised Sesh's performance

However, in the recent years, Panjaa seemed to have gained a massively positive reviews from the audience, seemingly deemed as a cult classic following the release of Pawan Kalyan-starrer They Call Him OG.
