= University Stadium =

University Stadium may refer to:

- University Stadium (Albuquerque), New Mexico, USA
- University Stadium (West Georgia), Georgia, USA
- University Stadium (Thiruvananthapuram), Kerala, India
- University Stadium (Waterloo, Ontario), Canada
- University Stadium (Winnipeg), Canada

== See also ==
- Estadio Universitario (disambiguation)
