= Maryade Ramanna =

- DVD cover
- Directed by: Patti V S Guruprasad
- Screenplay by: S. S. Rajamouli
- Based on: Maryada Ramanna by S. S. Kanchi
- Starring: Komal; Nisha Shah; Mukesh Rishi
- Cinematography: R Giri
- Edited by: Basavaraj Urs
- Music by: M. M. Keeravani
- Production company: Sri Jai Bhuvaneshwari Arts
- Release date: 23 September 2011
- Country: India
- Language: Kannada

Maryade Ramanna (transl. Respectable, brotherly Ram) is a 2011 Indian Kannada-language action comedy drama film directed by Guruprasad and starring Komal, Nisha Shah and Mukesh Rishi. It is a remake of the Telugu film Maryada Ramanna (2010), which itself is based on Our Hospitality (1923).

== Cast ==
- Komal as Ramu
- Nisha Shah as Aparna
- Mukesh Rishi as Desai
- Rajesh Nataranga as doctor
- Dharma
- Ramesh Bhat
- Doddanna
- Pushpa Swamy

== Production ==
The climax was shot in Kadapa city. Upendra voiced the bicycle in the film.

== Reception ==
A critic from Deccan Herald opined that "A fine story and screenplay prop up this film, which stutters in the first half but manages to keep the audience riveted in the second." A critic from Rediff.com said that "Maryade Ramanna tests your patience in the first half, but Komal manages to up your sprits in the second half with his antics". A critic from The Times of India wrote that "Komal steals the show as the talented comedian proves that he can also be a good hero with excellent dialogue delivery and brilliantly genuine expressions". A critic from Bangalore Mirror stated that "Komal once again shows that he is no less than a hero when it when it comes to entertaining. It must be said it is a treat to watch Komal playing a full-length role".
