= Yakshini (TV series) =

Indian fantasy television series

- Release poster
- Genre: Fantasy; Romance; Thriller
- Written by: Ram Vamsi Krishna
- Directed by: Teja Marni
- Starring: Vedhika; Rahul Vijay; Lakshmi Manchu; Ajay
- Music by: Priyadarshan Balasubramanian
- Country of origin: India
- Original language: Telugu
- No. of seasons: 1
- No. of episodes: 6

Production
- Executive producer: Kishore Kedari
- Producers: Shobu Yarlagadda; Prasad Devineni
- Cinematography: Jagadeesh Cheekati
- Editor: Karthikeyan Rohini
- Running time: 30 minutes
- Production company: Arka Media Works

Original release
- Network: Disney+ Hotstar
- Release: 14 June 2024

Yakshini is an Indian Telugu-language fantasy romantic thriller television series directed by Teja Marni and written by Ram Vamsi Krishna. Produced by Shobu Yarlagadda and Prasad Devineni through Arka Media Works, it stars Vedhika, Rahul Vijay, Lakshmi Manchu and Ajay in important roles.

It was released on 14 June 2024 on Disney+ Hotstar.

== Cast ==
- Vedhika as Maya
- Rahul Vijay as Krishna
- Lakshmi Manchu as Jwalamukhi
- Ajay as Mahakal
- Vadlamani Srinivas as Rama Rao
- Teja Kakumanu as Varun
- Dayanand Reddy as Sikindhar Gora
- Tenali Shakuntala as Alivelu
- Lalitha Kumari as Jennifar
- Indu as Silpa
- Lavanya Reddy as Deepa
- Gemini Suresh as Vijay
- Trinath as Ajay
- Praveen as Bunty
- Naveen Neni as Reddy
- Sattenna as Rajanna
- Sai Kiran Yedida as Thomas
- Praveen Katari as Ahmad

== Episodes ==
No.	Title	Directed by	Written by	Original release date
1	"The Hope"	Teja Marni	Ram Vamsi Krishna	14 June 2024
2	"The Hunt"	Teja Marni	Ram Vamsi Krishna	14 June 2024
3	"The Trap"	Teja Marni	Ram Vamsi Krishna	14 June 2024
4	"The Revelation"	Teja Marni	Ram Vamsi Krishna	14 June 2024
5	"The Vengeance"	Teja Marni	Ram Vamsi Krishna	14 June 2024
6	"The Beginning"	Teja Marni	Ram Vamsi Krishna	14 June 2024

== Reception ==
Akhila Menon of OTTPlay gave a rating of 2 out of 5 and stated that it "is a complete yawn fest that fails to create any impact". 123Telugu opined that the plot needs a more gripping narration to keep the proceedings interesting. Eenadu is critical about screenplay and story.

== See also ==
- List of Disney+ Hotstar original programming
