= Sikharam =

- Created by: Arka Media Works
- Written by: Rahul Varma
- Directed by: Anwar
- Creative director: Anuradha
- Starring: Sridhar Varma; Varshini
- Theme music composer: Khuddus
- Country of origin: India
- Original language: Telugu

Production
- Producer: Prasad Devineni
- Cinematography: Kumar
- Editor: Nagaraju
- Production company: Arka Media Works

Original release
- Network: ETV Telugu
- Release: 2012

Sikharam is a Telugu daily serial that is telecast on ETV Telugu.

== Description ==
Story about an idealistic Young man Eswar Chandra Prasad (Nagendra Babu) who dreams of developing his village through educating the people present in the village.
