= Arka Media Works =

Film production company

Arka Media Works Pvt Ltd
- Type: Privately held company
- Industry: Entertainment
- Founded: 2001
- Headquarters: Hyderabad, Telangana, India
- Key people: Shobu Yarlagadda; Prasad Devineni
- Products: Film production television production new media
- Owner: Shobu Yarlagadda; Prasad Devineni
- Website: Arka Media Works

Arka Media Works is an Indian film production and trans-media company based in Hyderabad known for their works in Telugu cinema and Television. It was founded in 2001 by Shobu Yarlagadda and Prasad Devineni. It has produced notable Baahubali media franchise.

== Filmography ==
=== Films ===
Key
†	Denotes films that have not yet been released

Year	Title	Notes
2004	Morning Raga	
2010	Vedam	
2010	Maryada Ramanna	
2011	Anaganaga O Dheerudu	Co-Production with Disney India, Disney World Cinema, and A Bellyful of Dreams Entertainment
2011	Panjaa	Co-Production with Sanghamitra Art Productions
2015	Baahubali: The Beginning	Simultaneously shot in Tamil
2017	Baahubali 2: The Conclusion	
2020	Uma Maheswara Ugra Roopasya	Co-Production with Mahayana Motion Pictures
2021	Pelli SandaD	Co-Production with RK Film Associates
2025	Baahubali: The Epic	
2026	Don't Trouble The Trouble	Co-Production with Showing Business
2026	John Doe	
TBA	Oxygen †	

=== Television ===
Year	Title	Language	Network	Notes
2003	Sach Honge Sapney	Hindi	ETV Network	
2003	Bhagya Bidhatha	Oriya	ETV Oriya	
2004	Anjali	Kannada	ETV Kannada	
2005	Sanskar	Oriya	ETV Oriya	
2005	Mane Ondu Mooru Bhagilu	Kannada	ETV Kannada	
2006	Malliswari	Telugu	Zee Telugu	
2007	Chandramukhi	Telugu	ETV	
2008	Bande BarutavaKaala	Kannada	ETV Kannada	
2008	Sree Sivanarayana Theerthulu	Telugu	SVBC	
2009	Aataina Paataina	Telugu	ETV	
2009	Manasu Chooda Tharama	Telugu	ETV	
2010	Shubhamangala	Kannada	ETV Kannada	
2010	Bada Ghara Bada Gumara Katha	Oriya	ETV Oriya	
2011	High Tension	Bengali	ETV Network	
2011	High Tension	Marathi	ETV Network	
2011	Preethi Illada Mele	Kannada	ETV Kannada	
2012	Deepavu Ninnade Gaaliyu Ninnade	Kannada	ETV Kannada	
2012	Sikharam	Telugu	ETV	
2013	Daanav Hunters	Hindi	Epic Channel	
2014	Agnisakshi	Kannada	Colors Kannada	
2014	Meghamala	Telugu	ETV	
2015–2022	Naa Peru Meenakshi	Telugu	ETV	
2017–2020	Baahubali: The Lost Legends	Hindi, English	Amazon Prime Video	Animated series based on characters of Baahubali; Co-produced with Graphic India
2018	Seetha Vallabha	Kannada	Colors Kannada	
2020	Amma	Telugu	ETV	
2021–2022	Parampara	Telugu	Disney+ Hotstar	
2021	Raavoyi Chandamama	Telugu	ETV	
2022	Anya's Tutorial	Telugu	Aha	
2024	Yakshini	Telugu	Disney+ Hotstar	

== Awards ==
Award	Year	Category	Work	Result
Nandi Awards	2011	Nandi Award for Best Feature Film (Gold)	Vedam	Won
Nandi Awards	2011	Best Popular Feature Film	Maryada Ramanna	Won
Filmfare Awards South	2011	Filmfare Award for Best Film – Telugu	Vedam	Won
National Film Awards	2016	National Film Award for Best Feature Film	Baahubali: The Beginning	Won
National Film Awards	2018	National Film Award for Best Popular Film Providing Wholesome Entertainment	Baahubali 2: The Conclusion	Won
Indian Film Festival of Melbourne	2018	Telstra People's Choice Award	Baahubali 2: The Conclusion	Won
