= Anjali Lavania =

Indian model, actress and spiritual life coach

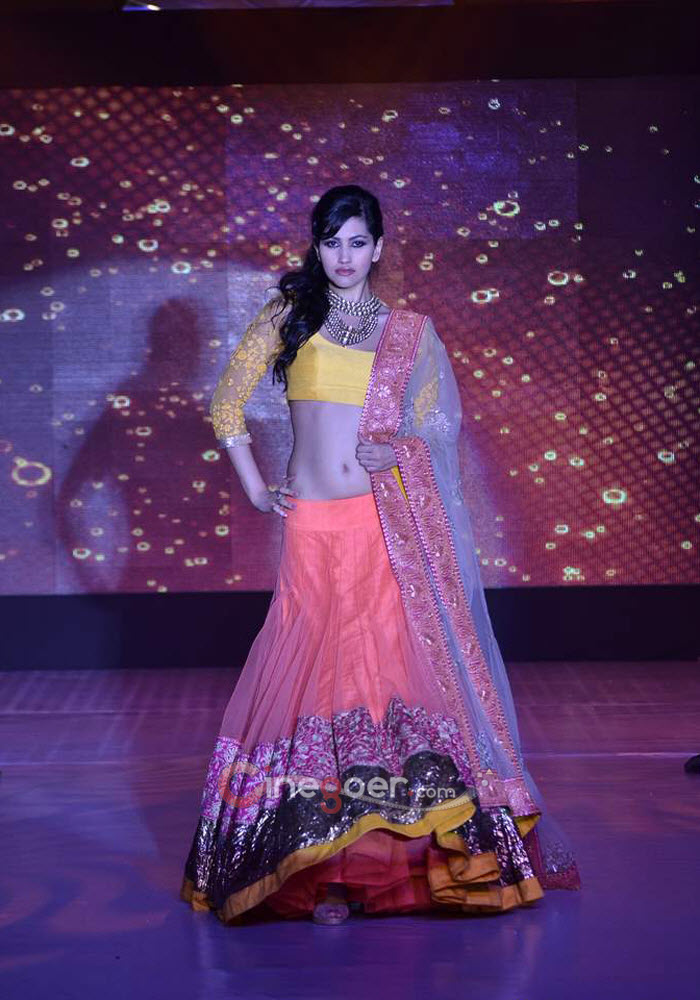
- Born: 15 May 1984 (age 42); Mumbai, India
- Occupations: Actress, Model, Lifecoach, Disc jockey, Television Presenter,

Anjali Lavania is an Indian model, actress, disc jockey and spiritual life coach. She made her acting debut in the 2011 Telugu film Panjaa, starring Pawan Kalyan.

== Career ==
Anjali Lavania hails from Mumbai, Maharashtra, India. Her mother is a model from Kerala, while her father is from Nainital and served in the Indian Navy as a naval aviator.

Anjali started off as a model for Roopam campaign and Sheetal Design Studio in Mumbai. She has modeled internationally for fashion designers Lotta Stensson, Ashaka Givens, Christopher Kane and Gary Harvey.She has walked the runway in New York and LA fashion weeks, Anjali is particularly active in the Eco-Green movement, she was featured in the Los Angeles Times for the Eco-nouveau show, during LA fashion week adorning the bridal, newspaper ensemble by British Designer Gary Harvey that was showcased at the MOMA in NYC.

She appeared in advertising campaigns for Provogue, Pantaloons, Mahindra Xylo, Titan and Levi's. In 2011, she featured alongside Aamir Khan in a Titan watch campaign and Imran Khan in a Levi's denim campaign.

She was featured in the Kingfisher Calendar in 2010 and 2011. She hosted Making of the Kingfisher Calendar in 2011 and was featured in the Times 50 Most Desirable Women list in 2010.

In 2011, she was cast by director Vishnuvardhan as the lead female character alongside Pawan Kalyan in the Telugu film Panjaa. In 2012 she was featured in Vogue's list of Top 10 models. Anjali Lavania is also featured in Manish Malhotra's Fashion (2012) with Vidyut Jamwal which was showcased in Delhi Couture week. In June 2012, Anjali won her first acting award at the very prestigious Cinemaa Awards for her Confident Debut in Panjaa opposite Pawan Kalyan. This award was presented to her by the iconic Nagarjuna.

In December 2022, Anjali ventured into DJing and music production. Her work draws on electronic music genres such as melodic techno and progressive house. She has performed in the same music festivals with industry icons like Hugel, Goom Gum, Senses of Mind, Mia Mendi, Masha Vincente & more.

== Life coaching ==
Following her career in modelling and acting, Anjali transitioned into spiritual life coaching. ETimes described her as a holistic life coach and noted her work in Kriya Yoga, chakra healing and holistic wellness.

Anjali is the founder of HigherSelfing™, a personal development platform offering spiritual life coaching, meditation and educational programmes.

According to the HigherSelfing website, she developed the HigherSelfing™ Methodology, an integrative coaching framework combining Neuro-Linguistic Programming (NLP), Kriya Yoga, Pranic Healing, Human Design and Vedic astrology.

== Filmography ==
Year	Film	Role	Language	Notes
2011	Panjaa	Jhanvi	Telugu	CineMaa Award Most Confident Debut of The Year

== Awards ==
- Won CineMAA Awards for Best New Confident Face for her acting in Panjaa.
