= High Tension (TV series) =

- Genre: Quiz show
- Starring: Atul Kulkarni
- Country of origin: India
- Original languages: Marathi; Bengali
- No. of episodes: 26

Production
- Producer: Prasad Devineni
- Production company: Arka Media Works

Original release
- Network: ETV Network
- Release: 2012

High Tension is a bilingual reality show in Marathi and Bengali languages.

== Description ==
A reality quiz show in Marathi and Bengali languages. Marathi Version of High Tension was hosted by famous Actor Atul Kulkarni while Bengali version was hosted by Shayan Munshi.

According to ETV, it's a different game show wherein three participants will compete at a time going through 5 rounds, facing 42 questions. The final winner has a chance of winning a maximum of Rupees Seven lakhs sixty three thousand.

== Crew ==
- Director:- Gyan sahay
- Producer:- Prasad Devineni
- Production:- Arka Media Works
