= High Voltage (disambiguation) =

High voltage is electrical potential large enough to cause injury or damage.

High Voltage may also refer to:

== Arts, entertainment and media ==
=== Film ===
- High Voltage (1929 film), an American pre-Code film
- High Voltage (1981 film), a Croatian film
- High Voltage (1997 film), a direct-to-video action film
- High Voltage (2018 film), an American scifi horror film

=== Music ===
- High Voltage (1976 album), by AC/DC, released internationally
  - "High Voltage" (song), by AC/DC, 1975
  - High Voltage (1975 album), by AC/DC, released only in Australia
- High Voltage (Eddie Harris album), 1969
- High Voltage (Emerson, Lake & Palmer album), 2010
- High Voltage (Count Basie album), 1970
- "High Voltage", a song by Linkin Park from, either the bonus edition CD release of Hybrid Theory, or their self titled demo tape from 1999 with the same name
- High Voltage, a Bahamian band, later Baha Men
- High Voltage Festival, a music festival in London, England

=== Other uses in arts, entertainment and media ===
- High Voltage Magazine, first published in 2003
- High Voltage, an Institution of Engineering and Technology academic journal
- High Voltage, a character in Disney's Big Hero 6
- High Voltage, later Faction Talk, a satellite radio channel

== Companies ==
- High Voltage Engineering Corporation, an American manufacturer of particle accelerators
- High Voltage Software, an American game development company

== Sport ==
- High Voltage (professional wrestling), a tag team of Robbie Rage and Kenny Kaos
- Matt Hardy (born 1974), professional wrestler, ring name High Voltage

== Other uses ==
- High Voltage (horse) (foaled 1952), a Thoroughbred racehorse
- High voltage in a digital signal, also known as "logical 1"

== See also ==
- "Danger! High Voltage", a 2002 song by Electric Six
- High Tension (disambiguation)
- Electric power transmission
- Overhead power line
