= Estadio Universitario =

Estadio Universitario or Estádio Universitário ("University Stadium") may refer to:

== Brazil ==
- Estádio Universitário Pedro Pedrossian in Campo Grande, Mato Grosso do Sul
- Estádio Universitário São Paulo in São Paulo

== El Salvador ==
- Estadio Universitario UES in San Salvador

== Mexico ==
- Estadio Universitario Alberto "Chivo" Córdoba in Toluca, State of Mexico
- Estadio Universitario (UANL) in San Nicolás de los Garza (Monterrey), Nuevo León
- Estadio Universitario BUAP in Puebla, Puebla
- Estadio Universitario Beto Ávila in Veracruz, Veracruz

== Portugal ==
- Estádio Universitário de Coimbra in Coimbra
- Estádio Universitário de Lisboa in Lisbon

== Venezuela ==
- Estadio Universitario de Caracas in Caracas
