= Shobu Yarlagadda and Prasad Devineni =

Indian film producer duo

- Born: Shobu Yarlagadda; 19 March 1971 (age 55); Gudivada, Andhra Pradesh, India; Prasad Devineni; 14 June 1975 (age 51); Vijayawada, Andhra Pradesh, India
- Occupation: Film producers
- Years active: 2010–present
- Relatives: Kovelamudi Raghavendra Rao (Shobu's father-in-law)

Yarlagadda Naga Sobhanadri and Devineni Srinivas Saiprasad, popularly known as Shobu Yarlagadda and Prasad Devineni are an Indian film producer duo. They founded Arka Media Works, a film production company known for its works in Telugu cinema and Telugu television shows. Their notable productions include Vedam (2010), Maryada Ramanna (2010), the Baahubali film series (2015–2017) and Uma Maheswara Ugra Roopasya (2020). Yarlagadda and Devineni have together garnered two National Film Awards, two state Nandi Awards, three Filmfare South Awards, two SIIMA awards, one Zee Cine Awards Telugu and a Saturn Award.

== Early life ==
Shobu Yarlagadda was born in Gudivada in Krishna District, Andhra Pradesh. He graduated in Civil and Environmental Engineering from Andhra University in 1992. He graduated in Agricultural Engineering from Texas A&M University in 1995. For over a year and a half, he worked as an Air Resources Engineer in Greater Los Angeles Area for California Air Resources Board. In 2001, he established Arka Media Works with Prasad Devineni.

Shobu Yarlagadda is the son-in-law of veteran director K. Raghavendra Rao.

== Career ==
In 2001, Yarlagadda established Arka Media Works; Arka means sun rays in Sanskrit. It produces television content in six languages (Telugu, Tamil, Kannada, Oriya, Bangla and Marathi). He has worked as line producer for films such as Morning Raga, and Anaganaga O Dheerudu. He was Executive Producer for films such as Bobby and Pandurangadu. Prasad Devineni produced Pallakilo Pellikoothuru.

Yarlagadda and Devineni serve as the board members of Arka Media Works. They produced the two part Baahubali: The Beginning (2015) which premiered at the Brussels International Fantastic Film Festival, and Baahubali 2: The Conclusion (2017) which premiered at the British Film Institute, while becoming the highest grossing Indian multilingual film franchise of all time globally with a cumulative box office earnings of approximately ₹1,800 crore (US$190 million). The first part of the Telugu film, The Beginning has received the National Film Award for Best Feature Film, and got nominated for Saturn Award for Best Fantasy Film by the American Academy of Science Fiction, Fantasy and Horror Films. The second part has garnered the Telstra People's Choice Award at the 2017 Indian Film Festival of Melbourne. The second part of the Telugu film, The Conclusion (2017) received the American Saturn Award for Best International Film, and the Australian Telstra People's Choice Award.

== Filmography ==
Year	Title	Role	Producer(s)	Notes
2004	Pallakilo Pellikoothuru	Producer	Shobu Yarlagadda	Produced under Sri Vara Siddhi Vinayaka Films
2010	Vedam	Producer	Shobu Yarlagadda	
2010	Maryada Ramanna	Producer	Shobu Yarlagadda, Prasad Devineni	
2011	Anaganaga O Dheerudu	Co-Producer	Shobu Yarlagadda	Co-produced with Disney India and A Bellyful of Dreams Entertainment
2011	Panjaa	Co-Producer	Shobu Yarlagadda, Prasad Devineni	Co-produced with Sanghamitra Art Productions
2015	Baahubali: The Beginning	Producer	Shobu Yarlagadda, Prasad Devineni	Simultaneously shot in Tamil
2017	Baahubali 2: The Conclusion	Producer	Shobu Yarlagadda, Prasad Devineni	Partially reshot in Tamil
2020	Uma Maheswara Ugra Roopasya	Co-Producer	Shobu Yarlagadda, Prasad Devineni	Co-produced with Mahayana Motion Pictures
2021	Pelli SandaD	Co-Producer	Shobu Yarlagadda, Prasad Devineni	Co-produced with RK Film Associates
2024	Yakshini	Producer	Shobu Yarlagadda, Prasad Devineni	Web series on Disney+ Hotstar
2025	Baahubali: The Epic	Producer	Shobu Yarlagadda, Prasad Devineni	
2026	Don't Trouble the Trouble	Co-Producer		

== Awards and nominations ==
Year	Award	Category	Work	Recipient(s)	Result
2011	Nandi Awards	Best Feature Film	Vedam	Shobu Yarlagadda	Won
2011	Nandi Awards	Best Popular Feature Film	Maryada Ramanna	Shobu Yarlagadda, Prasad Devineni	Won
2015	National Film Awards	Best Feature Film	Baahubali: The Beginning	Shobu Yarlagadda, Prasad Devineni	Won
2015	Filmfare Awards South	Best Film – Telugu	Baahubali: The Beginning	Shobu Yarlagadda, Prasad Devineni	Won
2015	SIIMA Awards	Best Film – Telugu	Baahubali: The Beginning	Shobu Yarlagadda, Prasad Devineni	Won
2015	Producers Guild Film Awards	President's Honour	Baahubali: The Beginning	Shobu Yarlagadda, Prasad Devineni	Won
2016	Nandi Awards	Best Feature Film	Baahubali: The Beginning	Shobu Yarlagadda, Prasad Devineni	Won
2016	Saturn Awards	Best Fantasy Film	Baahubali: The Beginning	Shobu Yarlagadda, Prasad Devineni	Nominated
2017	Zee Cine Awards Telugu	Best Film	Baahubali 2: The Conclusion	Shobu Yarlagadda, Prasad Devineni	Won
2018	National Film Awards	Best Popular Film Providing Wholesome Entertainment	Baahubali 2: The Conclusion	Shobu Yarlagadda, Prasad Devineni	Won
2018	Saturn Awards	Best International Film	Baahubali 2: The Conclusion	Shobu Yarlagadda, Prasad Devineni	Won
2018	SIIMA Awards	Best Film – Telugu	Baahubali 2: The Conclusion	Shobu Yarlagadda, Prasad Devineni	Won
2018	Filmfare Awards South	Best Film – Telugu	Baahubali 2: The Conclusion	Shobu Yarlagadda, Prasad Devineni	Won
