= Seetha Vallabha =

Indian television drama

- Genre: Drama
- Created by: Parmeshwar Gundkal
- Developed by: Nagesh Guddahalli
- Written by: Bharath Divakar
- Directed by: Mahesh Bhagwan Sarang
- Starring: Jaganath Chandrashekar; Supriya Sathyanarayana; Chandana Mahalingaiah; Hema.V. Bellur; Darsh Chandrappa
- Opening theme: Seetha Vallabha Seethaa Vallabha
- Composer: Karthik Sharma
- Country of origin: India
- Original language: Kannada
- No. of episodes: 537

Production
- Producers: Nandini .N.Murthy, Karthik Paradkar
- Cinematography: Sanna Thagachari
- Editor: Krishna.M.Harinahalli
- Camera setup: Multi-camera
- Running time: 22 minutes
- Production company: Jayadurga Creations

Original release
- Network: Colors Kannada
- Release: 18 June 2018 – 16 August 2020

Seetha Vallabha is an Indian Kannada language television drama that premiered on Colors Kannada on 18 June 2018. It came into the foray due some remarkable performances by the lead pair. Telecast of serial began in Colors Kannada channel and remains the same till date. The show ended in August 2020, after airing successfully for two years. The show was dubbed in Hindi as Dil Ka Rishta on Colors Rishtey UK from 2 September 2019 - 2 December 2021 and in Odia on Colors Odia as Ehi Milana Juga Jugara.

== Plot ==
Acchu, the son of a rich business tycoon, falls in love with Gubbi, an orphan. However, they have to fight the societal norms and expectations to stay together. But much changes after they marry.

== Cast ==
- Akarsh Bairamudi / Jaganath Chandrashekhar as Acchu alias Arya
- Supritha Sathyanarayana as Gubbi alias Mythili
- Chanadana Mahalingaiha as Ankitha
- Vanishree as Devaki
- Hema V.Belur
- Darsh Chandrappa
- Binny Joseph
