= Sri Venkateswara University Ground =

Stadium in Tirupati, India

- Location: Tirupati, Andhra Pradesh, India
- Country: India
- Establishment: 1984
- Owner: Sri Venkateswara University
- Tenants: Sri Venkateswara University

Sri Venkateswara University Ground is a multi-purpose stadium located in Tirupati, Andhra Pradesh. The stadium has facilities to host cricket, hockey, football, basketball, and lawn tennis matches, as well as a 400-meter track, a pavilion, and galleries. The ground has hosted Ranji Trophy matches in 1984 and 1992. Karnataka cricket team and Andhra cricket team playing in the first match where Karnataka won by 141 runs. In second match also Andhra losses to Tamil by an innings and 166 runs. International cricketer like VB Chandrasekhar, Woorkeri Raman, Robin Singh, Roger Binny, Sadanand Viswanath, Gundappa Viswanath, Brijesh Patel played on this ground.

== See also ==
- NTR Cricket Stadium,Tirupati
