= Maryada Ramanna =

2010 Indian film by S. S. Rajamouli

- Theatrical release poster
- Directed by: S. S. Rajamouli
- Screenplay by: S. S. Rajamouli
- Story by: S. S. Kanchi
- Dialogues by: S. S. Kanchi
- Based on: Our Hospitality by Buster Keaton
- Produced by: Shobu Yarlagadda; Prasad Devineni
- Starring: Sunil; Saloni; Nagineedu
- Cinematography: C. Ramprasad
- Edited by: Kotagiri Venkateswara Rao
- Music by: M. M. Keeravani
- Production company: Arka Media Works
- Distributed by: Arka Media Works
- Release date: 23 July 2010
- Running time: 125 minutes
- Country: India
- Language: Telugu
- Budget: ₹120–140 million
- Box office: ₹285 million (distributor share)

Maryada Ramanna (transl. 'Respectable, brotherly Ram') is a 2010 Indian Telugu-language action comedy drama film directed by S. S. Rajamouli, who co-wrote the script with S. S. Kanchi. Produced by Shobu Yarlagadda and Prasad Devineni under Arka Media Works, the film stars Sunil, Saloni and Nagineedu in the lead roles. The music was composed by M. M. Keeravani, with cinematography by Ram Prasad.

It is Inspired by the Buster Keaton's silent comedy film Our Hospitality. When Rajamouli watched Our Hospitality, he liked it immensely and wanted to retell the story in his own way. He attempted to contact the original creators but discovered that the original writers had long since died and that the film's copyright had expired, as it had been over 75 years since its release. S. S. Kanchi and Rajamouli adapted the story with a Rayalaseema backdrop, focusing on the factional violence and hospitality that co-existed in the region.

The film was released theatrically on 23 July 2010, the film opened to positive reviews from critics and audiences alike. Made on a budget of ₹120–140 million, the film was commercially successful and earned a distributor share of over ₹285 million (US$3.0 million). It became one of the highest grossing Telugu films of 2010. It received four Nandi Awards, including Best Popular Feature Film. The film was remade in five languages: Kannada, Bengali, Hindi, Tamil and Malayalam.

== Plot ==
In 1982, the village of Gandikota in the Rayalaseema region is consumed by a violent feud between two prominent families. The first faction is led by Ramineedu, who has two teenage sons, Mallasuri and Baireddy, while the second is led by Raghava Rao, who has an infant son. During a violent confrontation, Raghava Rao kills Ramineedu's brother and subsequently succumbs to his own injuries. Raghava Rao's widow flees the village with her infant son, raising him in the city completely oblivious to his ancestral history. Swearing absolute vengeance, Ramineedu and his sons vow to execute any surviving male member of Raghava Rao's lineage.

In 2010, the orphaned son, Ramu, is a cash-strapped man who loses his employment. Needing capital to purchase an auto-rickshaw for his livelihood, Ramu receives a legal notice stating that he has inherited five acres of ancestral land in Gandikota. He boards a train to the village, intending to sell the property. During the journey, he befriends a co-passenger, Aparna, who introduces him to her father—who happens to be Ramineedu. Unaware of Ramu's parentage, Ramineedu hospitably invites him to stay at their mansion and promises to assist him with the land sale. However, Mallasuri soon discovers Ramu's true identity and informs his father and brother. Because an unyielding generational tradition strictly prohibits the shedding of blood within the household, the three men are forced to wait for Ramu to voluntarily step outside the front gates before executing him. Overhearing their murderous conspiracy, a terrified Ramu realizes he must remain inside the mansion at all costs.

To prolong his stay, Ramu fakes an injury caused by a courtyard swing. Srikanth—Aparna's maternal cousin, a physician who is expected to marry her—privately discovers that Ramu is uninjured. Misinterpreting Ramu's avoidance as a romantic ploy to stay close to Aparna, Srikanth plays along and publicly prescribes absolute bed rest, frustrating Ramineedu's attempts to lure Ramu outside. The situation becomes more complex the following day, which marks the death anniversary of Ramineedu's brother, bringing a large influx of relatives to the house. Theorizing that a crowded house ensures his safety, Ramu manipulates Srikanth and his eager parents into finalizing Srikanth's engagement to Aparna immediately. To convince Srikanth, Ramu eloquently describes Aparna's best virtues, which inadvertently causes Aparna to fall deeply in love with Ramu instead.

To circumvent the household restriction, Ramineedu schedules the formal engagement ceremony to take place at the local village temple, forcing Ramu's departure. Realizing his predicament, Aparna confronts Ramu. Upon learning the truth about the blood feud, she agrees to aid his escape, instructing him to hide inside one of the massive ceremonial flower baskets being transported to the temple, and to meet her at a local mosque to flee the village. Before he can escape, an impatient Mallasuri corners Ramu and takes him to the penthouse to kill him covertly. Ramu outwits Mallasuri, locking him in the room, and hides. Baireddy spots a flower basket being carried out and pursues it mid-procession, only to discover that Ramu trickily remained inside the house.

Ramu attempts to flee the village on foot but is rapidly pursued by Mallasuri and Baireddy. Meanwhile, Aparna confesses her love for Ramu to Srikanth. Understanding her feelings, Srikanth informs Ramineedu, who furiously rejects the notion and joins the hunt for Ramu. Aparna reaches Ramu first and directs him toward a safe route out of the region. However, Ramu insists she stay behind, unaware of her feelings for him. Ramineedu and his sons ambush them, assuming Ramu was attempting to elope with Aparna. As they prepare to execute him, Aparna shields Ramu, asserting that she initiated the escape and that Ramu is completely innocent of tricking her.

Moved by her genuine devotion, Ramu finally acknowledges his love for Aparna and surrenders himself to her family, enduring a brutal beating from her brothers. As Ramineedu prepares the final fatal blow, a distraught Aparna leaps off a high bridge into the raging river below. Disregarding his own safety, a severely battered Ramu dives into the river and successfully rescues her from drowning. Witnessing Ramu's profound selflessness, a reformed Ramineedu and his sons realize the emptiness of their generational hatred. Acknowledging that no one will care for his daughter more than Ramu, Ramineedu permanently renounces the blood feud and happily unites the couple.

== Cast ==
- Sunil as Kovelamudi Ram 'Ramu', Raghava Rao's son
- Saloni as Kovelamudi Aparna Ram aka Appu, Ramineedu's younger daughter; Ramu's wife
- Nagineedu as Ramineedu
- Supreeth as Mallasuri, Ramineedu's elder son
- Prabhakar as Baireddy, Ramineedu's second son
- Brahmaji as Srikanth, Mallasuri, Baireddy, and Aparna's cousin
- Anuj Gurwara as Ghanshyamdas, a businessman
- Subbaraya Sharma as Ramu's uncle
- Rao Ramesh as Broker
- Chatrapathi Sekhar as Kovelamudi Raghava Rao, Ramu's father
- Sandhya Janak as Ramineedu's wife
- S. S. Kanchi as Train Co-Passenger
- Master Simha as Obuleshu

Voice cast

- Ravi Teja as bicycle

== Production ==
Maryada Ramanna was inspired by a 1923 Buster Keaton silent film Our Hospitality. One could say I copied the film. I don’t mind. When I saw the original I liked it so much I wanted to re-tell the same story in my own way. I even tried to find the original creators. But no one existed. The original writers died in the 1930s. Technically any material that has existed for more than 75 years can be used without a copyright claim. But if you use material in [a] Hindi film from a contemporary Punjabi, Oriya or Telugu film you need to take permission.

— Rajamouli on the genesis of Maryada Ramanna

Rajamouli wanted to re-tell the 1923 silent comedy film Our Hospitality in his own way. He later found out that the film's copyright had expired as it had been over 75 years since the film's release. He and his cousin S. S. Kanchi had adapted that story with a Rayalaseema backdrop, focusing on the factional violence and hospitality that co-existed in the region.

The film was officially launched in June 2009 at Ramanaidu Studios in Hyderabad. Rajamouli said,

"I decided that my next project would be Maryada Ramanna during Magadheera shooting itself because it is a one and a half years project that demands a lot of physical labour and mental strain. I didn't want to commit another physically exhausting film immediately after Magadheera. Maryada Ramanna gave us time to recharge our batteries so that we could come up with another huge project."

He also revealed the film's plot on the film's launch to minimize the expectations of the audience because of Magadheera's success.

== Soundtrack ==
Maryada Ramanna

Soundtrack album by M. M. Keeravani
- Released: 6 July 2010
- Recorded: 2010
- Genre: Feature film soundtrack
- Length: 19:57
- Language: Telugu
- Label: Vel records
- Producer: M. M. Keeravani

M. M. Keeravani chronology
Jhummandi Naadam (2010)	Maryada Ramanna (2010)	Anaganaga O Dheerudu (2011)

The audio was released at a function held at Shilpakala Vedika, Hyderabad. The launch of the audio release was a webcast live on the internet, and it received a positive response from internet viewers globally.

Dasari Narayana Rao released the audio and handed over the first copy to K. Raghavendra Rao. The function was also attended by noted film fraternity like Junior NTR, Ravi Teja, Prakash Raj, V. V. Vinayak, Dil Raju, Prabhas, Sirivennela and other prominent cast and crew of the film. Meanwhile, music director M. M. Keeravani's birthday was also celebrated at a star-studded function.

Tracklist
No.	Title	Lyrics	Artist(s)	Length
1.	"Ammayi Kitiki Pakkana"	Anantha Sreeram	Karunya, Chaitra	3:37
2.	"Udyogam Oodipoyindi"	Ramajogayya Sastry	Ranjith	3:45
3.	"Telugammayi"	Anantha Sreeram	M. M. Keeravani & Geetha Madhuri	4:05
4.	"Raaye Raaye"	Chaitanya Prasad	Raghu Kunche & Geetha Madhuri	4:21
5.	"Parugulu Thiyy"	Sirivennela Seetharama Sastry	S. P. Balasubrahmanyam	4:10
Total length:				19:57

== Reception ==
The film received favourable reviews from critics. Raghu Chaitanya from CNN-IBN said "The climax is perhaps the only drawback in the entire movie as the director opts to take the clichéd path of emotions and love. Sunil perfectly fits the bill as the innocent guy who comes back to sell his land and make money [...] SS Rajamouli emerges a winner showing that he can make good movies without huge budgets and big star cast." The Times of India gave a two and a half stars explained "Comedian Sunil, who turned hero with Andalaramudu a few years ago this time returns with another roaring comic flick and puts in a restrained performance. However, a well-designed set, great cinematography and mellifluous tunes by Keeravani takes this comic caper to a different plane."

Sify which gave a verdict as "Worth a watch" further noted "Sunil would no longer look like a comedy hero. His dances are simply superb, Saloni is beautiful and holds natural sex appeal. It is unfortunate that her talents remained undetected for the last three years, but for Rajamouli, now. She performed with perfection all through the movie. Definitely, she awaits a bright future hereafter, it seems. Maryada Ramanna has a judicious mix of fun, thrill and suspense." Rediff gave a three stars, commented Maryada Ramanna is thoroughly enjoyable. Rajamouli sure has a winner on his hands. Sunil is able to captivate the audience and Saloni looks pretty and is convincing too. Nagineedu portrays the role brilliantly. There are quite a few others like Brahmaji, Anuj Gurwara and Rao Ramesh who perform well."

== Remakes ==
Maryada Ramanna was remade in several languages. Nagineedu reprised his role from the original film in the Tamil and Malayalam versions. It is Rajamouli's second most remade film behind Vikramarkudu, which was remade six times in five languages.

Year	Film	Language	Ref.
2011	Maryade Ramanna	Kannada	
2011	Faande Poriya Boga Kaande Re	Bengali	
2012	Son of Sardaar	Hindi	
2014	Vallavanukku Pullum Aayudham	Tamil	
2015	Ivan Maryadaraman	Malayalam	

== Box office ==
The film grossed ₹10 million (equivalent to ₹24 million or US$250,000 in 2026) in its first weekend of release in the United States. The film collected a share of ₹105.8 million (equivalent to ₹260 million or US$2.7 million in 2026) (after tax and theatre rentals) within 7 days in India (Note: Gross ref).

== Accolades ==
- Nandi Awards
  - Best Popular Feature Film Providing Wholesome Entertainment – Shobu Yarlagadda and Prasad Devineni
  - Best Villain – Nagineedu
  - Best Male Playback Singer – M. M. Keeravani for the song "Telugammayi"
  - Special Jury Award – Sunil
