= Baahubali (franchise) =

Indian media franchise

- Franchise logo
- Created by: S. S. Rajamouli
- Original work: Baahubali: The Beginning (2015)
- Owner: Arka Media Works
- Years: 2015–present

Print publications
- Novels: The Rise of Sivagami (2017); Chaturanga (2020); Queen of Mahishmathi (2020)
- Comics: Baahubali: Battle of the Bold (2017)

Films and television
- Films: The Beginning (2015); The Conclusion (2017); The Epic (2025); The Eternal War - Part 1 (2027)
- Television series: The Torch Bearer (2026)
- Animated series: The Lost Legends (2017–2020); Crown of Blood (2024)

Games
- Video game: Baahubali: The Game (2017)

Audio
- Soundtracks: The Beginning (2015); The Conclusion (2017)
- Original music: "Dhivara"; "Manohari"; "Saahore Baahubali"; "Hamsa Naava"; "Oka Praanam"

Miscellaneous
- Background score: Baahubali: Music from the Motion Picture
- Budget: ₹420 crore (2 films)
- Box office: ₹2,410.6–₹2,460.6 crore (2 films)

Official website
- Baahubali

Baahubali (styled as bāhubaLi (Note: Bāhubali is the IAST and ISO 15919 transliteration of the Telugu name. The transliteration of the Tamil name according to the same systems is Pākupali.) (Note: transl. 'The One with Strong Arms')) is an Indian Telugu-language media franchise created by S. S. Rajamouli and owned by Arka Media Works. The Telugu language franchise started off with a two-part film series directed by Rajamouli. The franchise is widely regarded as the most important and influential films in the history of Indian cinema.

The duology made a lasting impact and started a new film movement, pan-Indian film. The films in the franchise were jointly produced on a budget of ₹430 crore ($65 million). The first part Baahubali: The Beginning was released on 10 July 2015. The second part Baahubali 2: The Conclusion, released on 28 April 2017; which became the highest-grossing films in India of all time. The franchise became a commercial success, grossing over ₹2,400 crore worldwide. Both of the films received widespread critical acclaim in India and also worldwide. The duology of the franchise is currently the third highest-grossing film franchise in India.

The films were followed by two animated series, a graphic novel, and a trilogy of novels in English. The first novel in the franchise titled The Rise of Sivagami was released on 7 March 2017. The animated series Baahubali: The Lost Legends premiered on 19 April 2017 on Amazon Prime Video and Colors TV on 10 December 2017.

== Production ==
=== Development ===
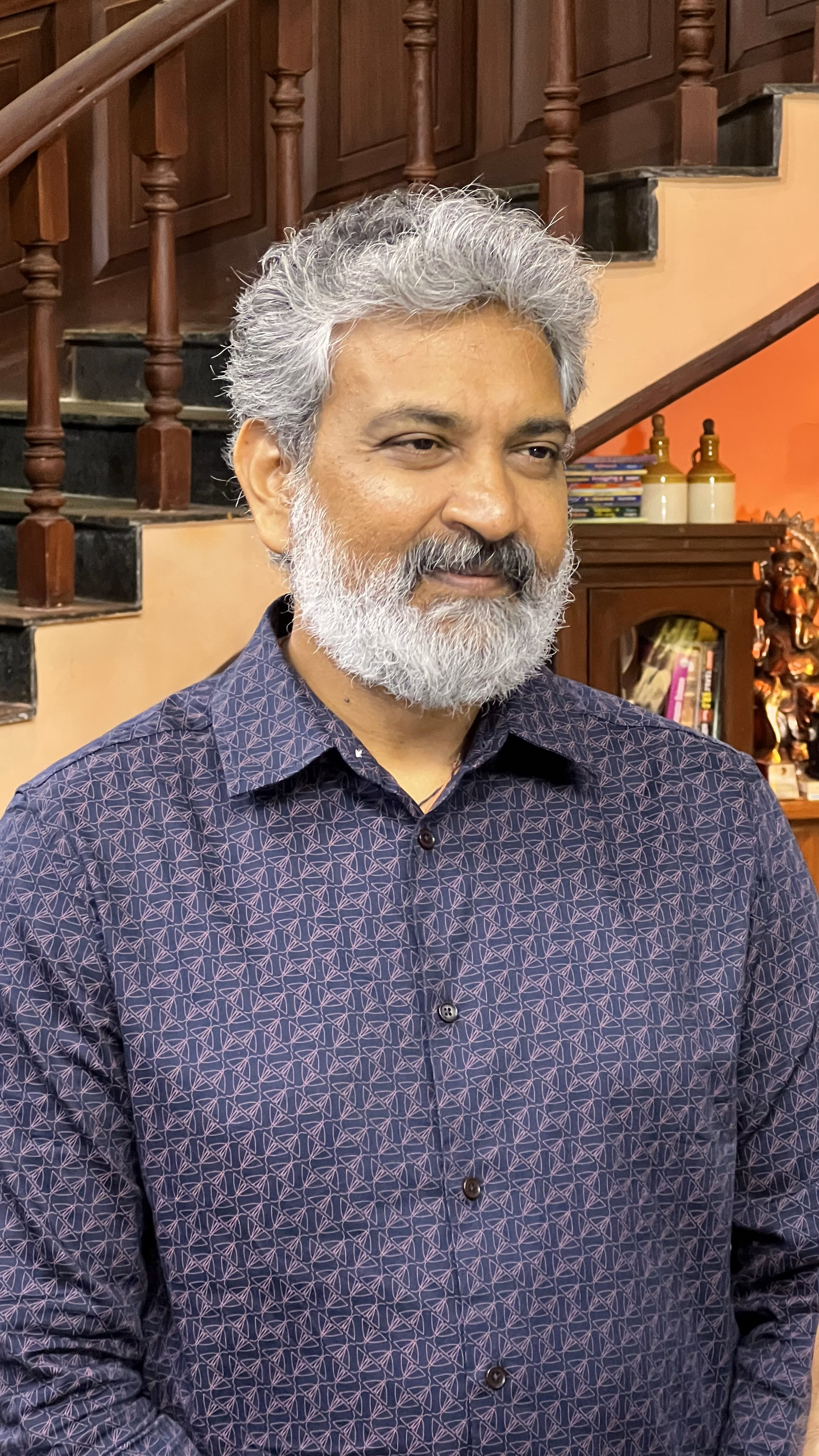
Director and screenplay writer S S Rajamouli

In February 2011, S. S. Rajamouli announced that his next film would star Telugu actor Prabhas. In January 2013, he announced that the working title was Baahubali, though it would later be finalised. P. M. Satheesh stated that much effort was taken to keep the recording free of anachronistic sounds of modern machinery. Prabhas, Rana and Anushka practiced sword fighting, while Prabhas and Rana learned horse riding. It was later decided to make it a two part film which would release by 2015. On why the film was split into two parts, Rajamouli said, "The story, about two warring brothers for a kingdom, is so big that one film is not enough. We tried but we were losing some of the emotional quotient hence the second release after a gap of 10 months." Tamil lyricist Madhan Karky was selected to write the dialogues for the Tamil version. He said that his dialogues would be along the lines of yesteryear epic historical movies like Manohara (1954) and Nadodi Mannan (1958) and that they would be in chaste Tamil. The film's action sequences were choreographed by Peter Hein who stated that efforts were being made to keep the visuals as a period film. For a particular action sequence, Peter Hein had to handle around 2000 stuntmen and elephants. K. K. Senthil Kumar was selected to handle the film's cinematography. Director S.S.Rajamouli said that he was inspired from epic Mahabharata in making Baahubali. The story of Baahubali: The Beginning and Baahubali: The Conclusion is set in Mahishmati kingdom.

Sodhe Matha sent legal notices to the film's producers in early January 2014 about the film's title Baahubali which is the name of a revered Arihant in Jainism, Bahubali, as they were afraid that the film would portray his story in a violent manner. Days later, Sobhu Yarlagadda defended the story of the film saying "The film has nothing to do with Gomatheswara or the Jain religion. The story is completely fictional written by Vijayendra Prasad and will remain so. 'Baahubali' refers to the amount of power the protagonist possesses." He also clarified that they haven't received the legal notice yet. In June 2015, Rajamouli remarked on the setting and backdrop of the film this way:

"The movie is set in a completely fictitious world and period, and I decided that I would design my own weapons and costumes whichever way I liked. People will buy into the film depending on how I present it."

The story is however similar in the manner that its about two brothers fighting for rights of a kingdom where the more powerful Bahubali lets go of the kingdom for his less powerful brother Bharata Chakravartin.

The creators were accused of copying the format and the idea of the "making video" from The Amazing Videohivers, a 123 seconds video clip, created by an Australian firm, which specializes in providing video templates for internet marketing. The video, which uses Adobe After Effects CS5 having a customizable template, depicts how film makers can use the video template to market their products. Regarding the issue, Shobhu Yarlagadda clarified "We have commercially purchased the template used in that video. We have licensed it legally. Anyone can license that template and it is not copying. We felt that the template is ideal for our video and hence we paid for it." Baahubali's first poster was released in early May 2015. The poster, which showed an infant being lifted from a waterbody by a woman's hand, was criticised for its lack of originality; Deccan Chronicle noted its similarities to the poster of the 1998 American film Simon Birch, commenting, "The Baahubali poster shows a woman's hand raising an infant from a river; the Hollywood film's poster shows an infant being raised by two hands from water. The image seems to be the same with one difference, the Baahubali poster's baby is seen in typical Indian attire."

P. M. Satheesh was the sound designer of the film. Regarding his experience with the film, he said "Baahubali is one of the very few films in South where a lot of importance is being given to sound recording. We dropped the idea of shooting with sync sound since the dialogue delivery has to be modified accordingly. The sound design team embeds various types of microphones throughout the set to record the ambient sound, which will lend a natural feel to the film. It's necessary, because some of these sounds aren't available in the market. It's quite a challenge for everyone". Sabu Cyril was the production designer of the film. In an interview with The Times of India, he said "Every hour is a challenge on the sets of Baahubali. Period films are a huge responsibility as there is no room for mistakes. Everything was created from scrap : chairs, thrones, palaces, swords, armor and costumes." Foley Artiste Philipe Van Leer started working with the film's crew from 5 November 2014 till 14 November 2014 at Dame Blanche complex in Belgium. Rana stated that the film is about a war between two cousin brothers – Baahubali played by Prabhas and Bhallaladeva played by Rana – for the kingdom of Mahishmati.

=== Casting ===
Prabhas was cast as main lead of the film. Anushka Shetty was cast as the heroine of the film as Rajamouli was impressed by her performances in Arundhati (2009) and Mirchi (2013). She starred in Rajamouli's Vikramarkudu, and coincidentally became the first heroine Rajamouli repeated in his films and thus made her schedules full for 2013 and 2014. Telugu actor Rana Daggubati was recruited as the antagonist of the film. Tamil actor Sathyaraj, who played Prabhas's father in Mirchi, signed the film.

Kannada actor Sudeep was picked for a small but important role in the film. He shot for four days in July 2013 for the film and had to fight with Sathyaraj in a stunt sequence choreographed by Peter Hein. In April 2013, Adivi Sesh was cast for a crucial role in the film as Rajamouli was impressed by his work in the Panjaa (2011). Actress Ramya Krishna was chosen to play the crucial role in the film as Rajamatha in August 2013. Actor Nassar was selected to play a supporting role. On 11 December 2013, a press release stated that Charandeep is selected for one of the negative characters in the film. On 20 December 2013 a press release stated that Tamannaah Bhatia will be second heroine of the film which marks her first collaboration with Rajamouli and second collaboration with Prabhas. Meka Ramakrishna was picked for the head of kuntala guerilla rebels.

=== Characters and looks ===
Baahubali Family Tree

Rana Daggubati was said to be playing the role of Prabhas' brother and he too underwent a lot of physical transformation for the role he was assigned to play in the film. He also underwent training in Martial arts under the supervision of a Vietnamese trainer, Tuan. Sathyaraj has a tonsured look for his role in the film. Sudeep said that he would play the role of a weapons trader Aslam Khan in this film. At the end of October 2013, Rana appeared at a fashion show with a beefed up body which, according to him, was a part of his look in the film. In mid-May 2014, reports emerged that Anushka would play a pregnant woman for a few sequences in the second part of the film. Both Prabhas and Rana maintained long hair for both films.

At the same time, Prabhas posted in his Facebook page that he underwent a minor shoulder surgery and would join the film's sets in a span of a month. On 1 June 2014, Prabhas and Rana's trainer Lakshman Reddy, said that Prabhas started his training 8 months before the commencement of shooting and after two years, both of them weighed nearly 100 kilos each. He also added that Prabhas has two attires with a heavy, bulky body for Baahubali's role and a lean physique for the second role. For his look, Prabhas met WWE superstars like The Undertaker in February 2014 and interacted with them about their daily regimen and workouts.

Prabhas had equipment costing ₹ 15 million(₹ 15 million) shipped to his home, where he built a personal gym. His breakfast included 40 half boiled egg whites blended and added with protein powder. In mid-June 2014, regarding her role in the film, Tamannaah said that she would be playing the role of a warrior princess named Avanthika and her appearance in the film is completely different when compared to her past films. Before joining the film's shoot, Tamannaah did costume trials for the film which she confirmed in her micro-blogging page stating "I am very excited to get on to the set of Baahubali. I did some dress trials today and my look in this movie will be totally new. I have never been seen in such sort of a look till now. It will be a new role for me." Rajamouli called Tamannaah and her characterization as a "value addition" to the movie. She stated that she plays Avanthika, and had a special training and diet regime. The film introduced a new language called Kilikili.

=== Filming ===
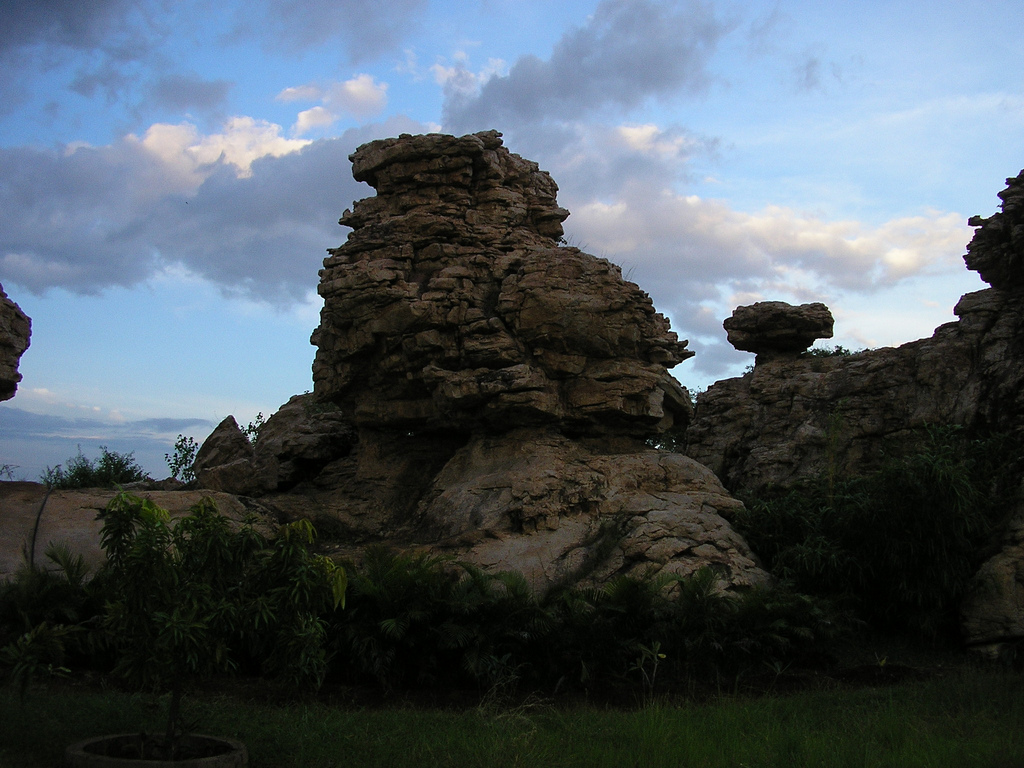
Orvakal Rock Gardens in Kurnool where principal photography began.

The shooting of the film started at Rock Gardens in Kurnool from 6 July 2013. At the end of August 2013, the film's shoot continued at Ramoji Film City in Hyderabad where key scenes on the lead cast were shot. The second schedule of the film ended on 29 August 2013. A new schedule started at Hyderabad on 17 October 2013. At the end of October 2013, the maize field specifically cultivated at Ramoji Film City for filming of few crucial sequences was destroyed by rains just a week before the start of the planned shoot there. The film's shoot again continued in Kurnool in November 2013 but the schedule ended abruptly due to incessant rains. Despite taking required measures, the film's crew could not control the people and around 30 thousand people reached the spot. After they were pacified by Prabhas and Rana, Rajamouli stood on the center stage and asked all of them to scream Jai Baahubali in sync. The entire incident was captured by the sound department so that it can be used in the film's final cut to create the right ambient sound in some crucial scenes. After that, the film's unit traveled to Kerala for their next schedule. The Kerala schedule started on 14 November 2013.

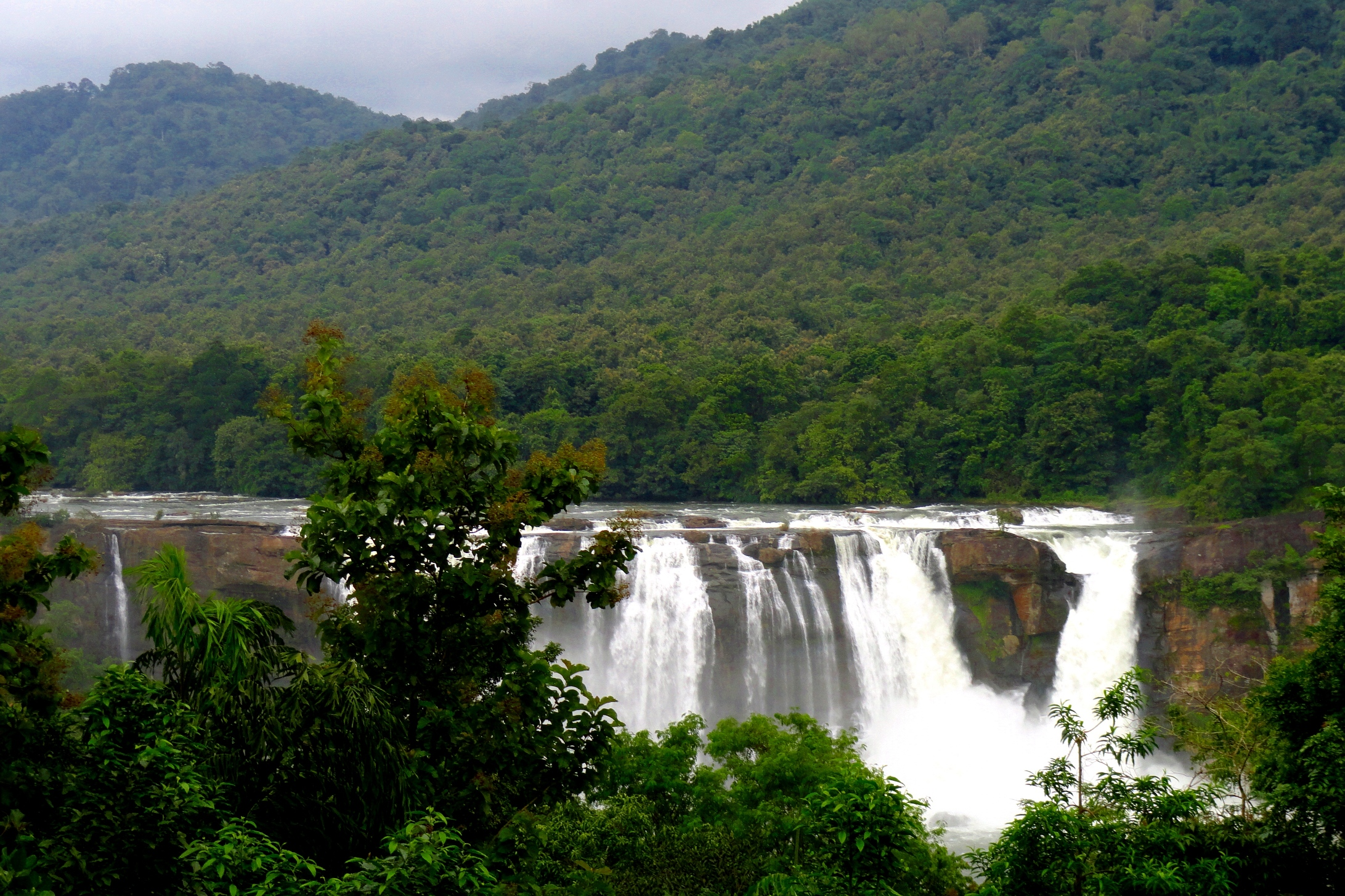
Athirappilly Falls in Thrissur district of Kerala where a few crucial sequences were shot as a part of the schedule.

Towards the end of November 2013, shooting was disrupted by incessant rains and since a portion of shoot was outdoor, the shoot was temporarily stalled. The shoot at Kerala completed on 4 December 2013 and include Athirappilly Falls. A set was erected in Ramoji film city to shoot war sequences involving around 2000 junior artists and almost all the principal cast from 23 December 2013 for which groundwork began in October 2013. There were reports that the farmers at Anajpur village close to Ramoji Film City tried to disrupt the film's shooting citing that they did not have the required permissions to shoot there which were denied by Rajamouli. The film's unit took a two-day break on the eve of New Year and the shoot of the sequence resumed from 3 January 2014. In mid-January 2014, a massive set was constructed there at Ramoji Film City resembling the city center of the kingdom in which the story unfolds. The film's unit took a break on account of Makar Sankranti and the shoot of war sequences resumed from 16 January 2014. On 18 January 2014, the film completed 100 working days of the film's shoot.

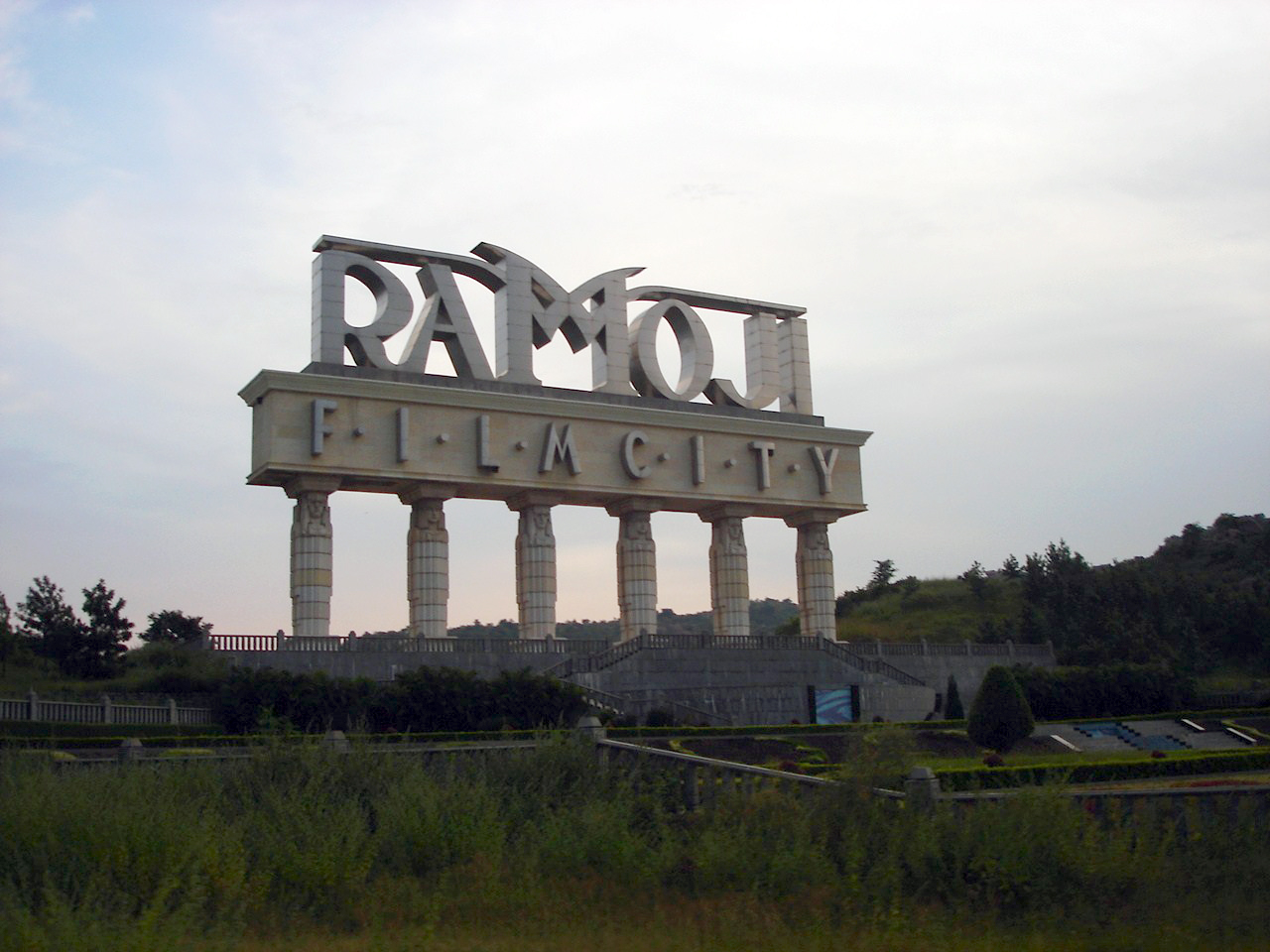
Ramoji Film City where the film's major parts including a huge war sequence were shot in specially erected sets.

From 28 March 2014, key scenes of the film were shot at night-time at Ramoji Film City. On 5 April 2014, Rajamouli informed that the war schedule came to an end. The film's next schedule started on 20 April 2014 after a brief break. The film's unit took a small break at the end of May 2014 after shooting some scenes on Rana Daggubati and Anushka at Ramoji Film City. Later Rana took a break from Baahubali's shooting for a couple of months. At the end of May 2014, it was reported that Tamannaah would join the sets in June 2014 and would participate till December 2014. Sudeep returned to the film's sets on 7 June 2014 and participated in the shoot along with Sathyaraj at Golconda Fort to start a fresh schedule which ended on 10 June 2014. Rajamouli started re-shoot of some scenes which were originally scheduled for last year whose shoot were disrupted by heavy rains. Tamannaah joined the film's sets in Hyderabad on 23 June 2014. At the end of June 2014, the filming continued at Annapurna Studios in Hyderabad. Prabhas, Tamannaah, Anushka and Rana participated in the shooting and important scenes were shot. That schedule ended after four days. At the same time, it was reported that the film's unit would travel to Bulgaria to shoot the sequences in maize fields which were supposed to be shot in the field destroyed due to rains at Hyderabad in October 2013.

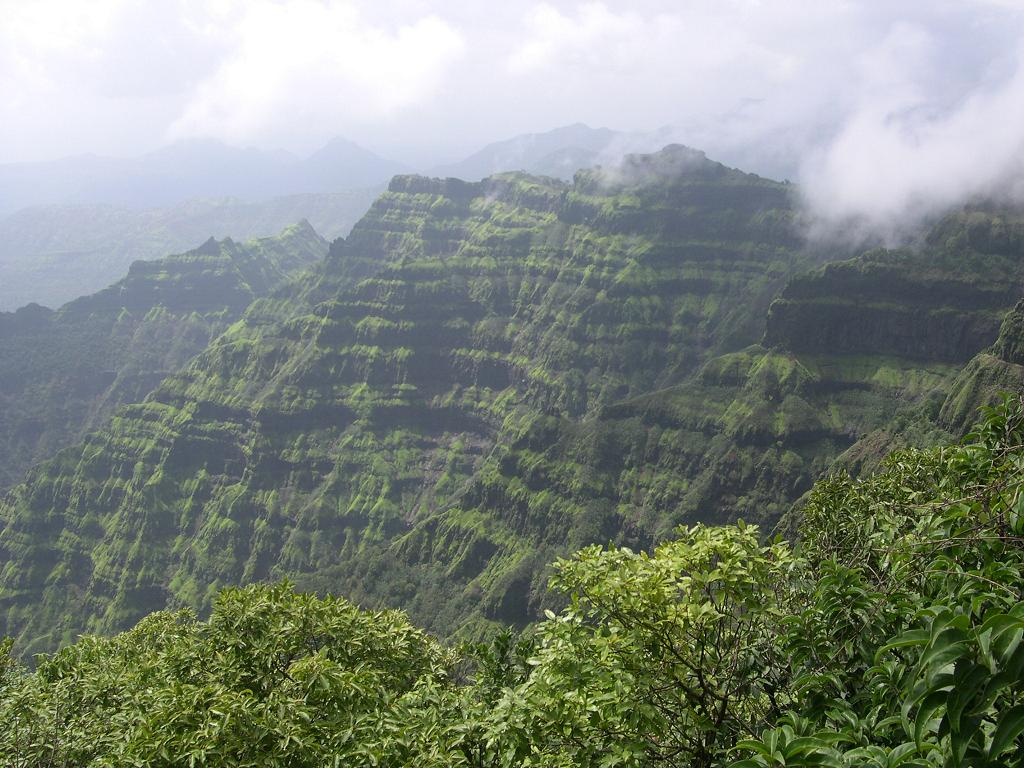
Mahabaleshwar where the film was shot in extreme climatic conditions including fog, rain and cold weather.

A romantic song featuring Prabhas and Tamannaah was shot in a specially erected set in Ramoji Film City in the third week of July 2014 which was choreographed by K. Sivasankar. The song was shot using ropes and trusses which are generally used in the action scenes and the film's director of photography K. K. Senthil Kumar stated that the song is shot with an innovative concept with rich visuals. After its completion, an action sequence was shot at Ramoji Film City under the supervision of Peter Hein. On 10 August 2014 the film was declared as the first Telugu film to have been shot for 200 days. A fresh schedule started at Mahabaleshwar on 26 August 2014. The cast and crew had to brave bad weather, including rain, fog and cold weather to complete the scenes. After nearly two weeks, the team wrapped up the schedule and the next schedule began at Ramoji Film City in Hyderabad from 12 September 2014. Sabu Cyril designed a 100 feet statue which was erected by Peter Hein in late September 2014. Filming continued at Hyderabad though the rest of the films shoots were halted because of the ongoing strike by Telugu Film Federation Employees as they employed the staff not belonging to the Federation.

A few action sequences were shot at Ramoji Film City till 30 November on Prabhas and Rana. During the film's shoot for a particular sequence, Tamannaah stood under an artificial tree designed by Sabu Cyril as a part of the set to which she was tied to make sure that she did not fly away because of the strong winds. In early December 2014, the film's unit shifted to Bulgaria for a 25-day schedule. It was reported to shift to Bulgaria from Hyderabad because of the ongoing Telugu Film Federation Employees' strike though the makers refuted those reports adding that the schedule was planned long ago. After three weeks of shoot, the film's unit returned to Hyderabad on 23 December 2014. The film's shoot later continued at Ramoji Film City and from 22 December 2014, thousand horses brought from Rajasthan were planned to be used for shooting. A special song "Manohari" was filmed in March 2015 featuring Nora Fatehi, Scarlett Mellish Wilson, Madhu Sneha along with Prabhas.

A completely new language, called Kiliki was created by the lyricist Madhan Karky which is spoken by the Kalakeya tribe.

== Feature films ==
=== Live-action films ===
Film	India release date	Director	Screenwriter	Story writer(s)	Producer(s)	Refs.
Baahubali: The Beginning	10 July 2015	S. S. Rajamouli	S. S. Rajamouli	V. Vijayendra Prasad	Shobu Yarlagadda and Prasad Devineni	
Baahubali 2: The Conclusion	28 April 2017	S. S. Rajamouli	S. S. Rajamouli	V. Vijayendra Prasad	Shobu Yarlagadda and Prasad Devineni	
Baahubali: The Epic	31 October 2025	S. S. Rajamouli	S. S. Rajamouli	V. Vijayendra Prasad	Shobu Yarlagadda and Prasad Devineni	

=== Box office ===
Film	Release date	Budget	Box office
Baahubali: The Beginning	10 July 2015	₹180 crore (US$28.06 million)	₹650.12 crore (US$101.32 million)
Baahubali 2: The Conclusion	28 April 2017	₹250 crore (US$38.39 million)	₹1,810.60 crore (US$275.43 million) (Note: Baahubali 2 worldwide gross: ₹1,796.59 crore(US$275.43 million): India – ₹1,416.9 crore (US$217.58 million); Overseas – ₹379.69 crore (US$57.85 million); China – US$11,951,545 (₹80.78 crore); Japan – ¥150 million – US$0.95 million (₹12.94 crore); Russia – US (₹ 58 lakh); Other territories – ₹289.6 crore(US$44.47 million))
Baahubali: The Epic	31 October 2025	₹10 crore (US$1.1 million)	₹51.35 crore
Total		₹440 crore (US$50 million)	₹2512.07 crore (US$283 million)

=== Critical reception ===
Film	Rotten Tomatoes
Baahubali: The Beginning	91% (7.1/10 average rating) (22 reviews)
Baahubali 2: The Conclusion	88% (7.6/10 average rating) (26 reviews)
Baahubali: The Epic	100% (7.7/10 average rating) (13 reviews)

Both of the films received national and international acclaim for Rajamouli's direction, story, visual effects, cinematography, themes, action sequences, music, and performances, Baahubali: The Beginning, On the review aggregator website Rotten Tomatoes, 91% of 22 critics' reviews are positive, with an average rating of 7.1/10. Lisa Tsering based on The Hollywood Reporter wrote, "The story has been told many times before – a child is born destined for greatness and as a man vanquishes the forces of evil – but in the confident hands of accomplished South Indian director S.S. Rajamouli the tale gets potent new life in Baahubali: The Beginning." Allan Hunter, writing for Screen Daily noted that "The broad brushstrokes storytelling and the director's over-fondness for slow-motion sequences are among the film's failings but this is still a rousing film, easily accessible epic. There's rarely a dull moment in Baahubali: The Beginning, part one of a gung-ho, crowd-pleasing Telugu-language epic that has been shattering box-office records throughout India." Mike McCahill of The Guardian rated the film four stars out of five, praising the film, "Rajamouli defers on the latter for now, but his skilful choreography of these elements shucks off any cynicism one might carry into Screen 1: wide-eyed and wondrous, his film could be a blockbuster reboot, or the first blockbuster ever made, a reinvigoration of archetypes that is always entertaining, and often thrilling, to behold."

Baahubali 2: The Conclusion On the review aggregator website Rotten Tomatoes, 88% of 26 critics' reviews are positive, with an average rating of 7.6/10. It was further featured in Rotten Tomatoes' list of Best Off the Radar Films of 2017, in which Tim Ryan writes, Baahubali 2: The Conclusion plays like a shotgun wedding between Ben Hur and Kung Fu Hustle, seasoned with bits of Shakespeare, Kurosawa, and Buster Keaton," opining, "it's a blockbuster that's both gigantic and lighter than air". Simon Abrams of RogerEbert.com gave the film a 4/4 rating and writes the film "is everything I want but rarely get from superhero and big-budget fantasy movie" adding "the fight scenes... are so creative that they make even the most frequently abused creative shortcuts seem novel, everything from computer-generated imagery (CGI) to speed-ramping... You care what happens to the cast as they, aided by wires, hurl volleys of arrows at disposable minions and CGI animals".

Mike McCahill of The Guardian gave a 4/5 rating and called it "a jaw-dropping blockbuster that combines nimble action with genuine heart". He also stated, "This production's triumph is the room it's granted Rajamouli to head into the fields and dream up endlessly expressive ways to frame bodies in motion. Of the many sequences here primed to cut through jadedness, perhaps the most wondrous is that which finds Baahu guiding Deva mid-battle to shoot three arrows simultaneously – a set piece that speaks both to a love of action, and love in action. The budget's big, the muscle considerable, but they're nothing compared with Baahubali's heart". J Hurtado of Screen Anarchy writes, "It's a bit daunting because it does begin in media res immediately following the complex actions of the first film, but astute viewers will put together the pieces soon enough".

== Television ==
Title	Genre	Original release	Network
The Lost Legends	Animated	19 April 2017 – 10 April 2020	Amazon Prime Video
Crown of Blood	Animated	17 May 2024	Disney+ Hotstar
The Torch Bearer	Live-action documentary	26 June 2026	Netflix

== Print media ==
S. S. Rajamouli approached Indian novelist Anand Neelakantan to write a prequel trilogy of novels for the Baahubali film franchise.

- The Rise of Sivagami – Released on 31 March 2017, this novel serves as the first part of the Baahubali – Before the Beginning trilogy.
- Chaturanga – The second part of the trilogy, released on 6 August 2020.
- Queen of Mahishmathi – The third and final part, released on 28 December 2020.
- Baahubali: Battle of the Bold – A graphic novel published by Graphic India in August 2020.
- In July 2018, Baahubali was adapted into a Japanese manga by Akira Fukaya, known for titles such as Hakobiya Ken, Mitsurin Shounen and Tetsuo: The Bullet Man.

== Music ==
Baahubali: Music from the Motion Picture

Film score by M. M. Keeravani
- Released: 2018
- Recorded: 2015–2018
- Genre: Feature film score
- Labels: Lahari Music; T-Series
- Producer: M. M. Keeravani

Baahubali (One Man with Strong Arms) is the soundtrack of ten volumes composed by M. M. Keeravani, for the two-part Baahubali film series. The film score album consists of 10 volumes, varying from five to eight tracks with a duration of nearly twenty minutes, as a combination of Baahubali: The Beginning and Baahubali 2: The Conclusion, which were released in January–March 2018, in YouTube and all other streaming platforms. The film score was appreciated by both audience and critics alike, contributing to the success of both films.

Volume 1

Baahubali OST (Vol-1)

Film score by M. M. Keeravani
- Released: 6 January 2018
- Genre: Feature film score
- Labels: Lahari Music; T-Series
- Producer: M. M. Keeravani

Track listing
No.	Title	Length
1.	"Mahendra Baahubali Must Live"	2:55
2.	"The Mask and the Soldier"	2:07
3.	"Tattoo"	1:35
4.	"Bhalla and Bison"	1:11
5.	"Volcanic Words"	2:35
6.	"Man and Woman"	3:20

Volume 2

Baahubali OST (Vol-2)

Film score by M. M. Keeravani
- Released: 12 January 2018
- Genre: Feature film score
- Labels: Lahari Music; T-Series
- Producer: M. M. Keeravani

Track listing
No.	Title	Length
1.	"Mahishmathi... Brace Yourself"	2:27
2.	"Undying Glory"	2:54
3.	"Rage 1"	3:39
4.	"Rage 2"	4:15
5.	"The King and His Sword"	3:59

Volume 3

Baahubali OST (Vol-3)

Film score by M. M. Keeravani
- Released: 18 January 2018
- Genre: Feature film score
- Labels: Lahari Music; T-Series
- Producer: M. M. Keeravani

Track listing
No.	Title	Additional Vocal(s)	Length
1.	"Baahubali - The Story"	Mohana Bhogaraju	2:02
2.	"Sivagami"		0:38
3.	"True Colors"		1:58
4.	"Kaalakeyas"		1:01
5.	"Old Tools New Plan"		2:05
6.	"WKKB"	Geetha Madhuri, Aditya Iyengar	4:29

Volume 4

Baahubali OST (Vol-4)

Film score by M. M. Keeravani
- Released: 25 January 2018
- Genre: Feature film score
- Labels: Lahari Music; T-Series
- Producer: M. M. Keeravani

Track listing
No.	Title	Length
1.	"Agni Prasatham"	0:58
2.	"The Saviour"	1:14
3.	"Poison"	1:18
4.	"Sniffer Dog"	1:05
5.	"The Tour"	1:34
6.	"Compensation"	0:40

Volume 5

Baahubali OST (Vol-5)

Film score by M. M. Keeravani
- Released: 3 February 2018
- Genre: Feature film score
- Labels: Lahari Music; T-Series
- Producer: M. M. Keeravani

Track listing
No.	Title	Length
1.	"Devasena"	1:33
2.	"Kunthala"	1:22
3.	"Lust"	0:50
4.	"Killer"	0:35
5.	"Wrong Path"	0:58
6.	"Word Against Sword"	1:37

Volume 6

Baahubali OST (Vol-6)

Film score by M. M. Keeravani
- Released: 9 February 2018
- Genre: Feature film score
- Labels: Lahari Music; T-Series
- Producer: M. M. Keeravani

Track listing
No.	Title	Length
1.	"Love at First Sight"	1:52
2.	"Master Plan"	1:58
3.	"He is the Man"	1:32
4.	"Revealed Identity"	1:14
5.	"Royal Love"	1:01

Volume 7

Baahubali OST (Vol-7)

Film score by M. M. Keeravani
- Released: 14 February 2018
- Genre: Feature film score
- Labels: Lahari Music; T-Series
- Producer: M. M. Keeravani

Track listing
No.	Title	Length
1.	"Enter Mahishmathi"	1:22
2.	"The Court"	4:20
3.	"Greatest Honour"	0:24
4.	"My Wish is Your Priority"	1:28

Volume 8

Baahubali OST (Vol-8)

Film score by M. M. Keeravani
- Released: 20 February 2018
- Genre: Feature film score
- Labels: Lahari Music; T-Series
- Producer: M. M. Keeravani

Track listing
No.	Title	Additional Vocal(s)	Length
1.	"Please Leave Me"		2:18
2.	"Trap"	M. M. Keeravani, Kaala Bhairava	2:04
3.	"Stoned Heart"		1:02
4.	"Confession"		1:37

Volume 9

Baahubali OST (Vol-9)

Film score by M. M. Keeravani
- Released: 25 February 2018
- Genre: Feature film score
- Labels: Lahari Music; T-Series
- Producer: M. M. Keeravani

Track listing
No.	Title	Additional Vocal(s)	Length
1.	"Lullaby of Death"	Ramya Behara	2:20
2.	"Can You Ever Forgive Me?"		0:28
3.	"Birth of an Avenger"		3:56

Volume 10

Baahubali OST (Vol-10)

Film score by M. M. Keeravani
- Released: 4 March 2018
- Genre: Feature film score
- Labels: Lahari Music; T-Series
- Producer: M. M. Keeravani

Track listing
No.	Title	Length
1.	"Message From Forgotten Past"	2:12
2.	"Hatha Praveera"	0:38
3.	"We Can't Afford to Lose"	0:47
4.	"Think like Baahubali"	1:23
5.	"Sa Ho!"	0:57
6.	"Constitutional Advice"	1:04
7.	"War and Passion"	1:04
8.	"My Faith, My Mentor!"	6:31

== Video games ==
A mobile game titled Baahubali: The Game was released on 15 August 2017 by Moonfrog Labs, coinciding with India's Independence Day.

== Cancelled projects ==
A live-action prequel series titled Baahubali: Before the Beginning was commissioned by Netflix and was expected to be co-produced by S. S. Rajamouli. However, despite an investment of ₹150 crore, the project was eventually shelved.

== Cast and characters ==
List indicators
- Appeared characters in one or more films.
- Dark grey = character absent or unannounced.
- ^{Y} Younger version
- ^{O} Older version
- ^{U} Uncredited role
- ^{C} Cameo role
- ^{V} Voice-only role
- ^{P} Stills/photographs
- ^{A} Archival footage

Character	Live-action films		
Character	Baahubali: The Beginning (2015)	Baahubali 2: The Conclusion (2017)	Baahubali: The Epic (2025)
Amarendra Bahubali	Prabhas	Prabhas	Prabhas
Sivudu/ Mahendra Baahubali	Prabhas	Prabhas	Prabhas
Maharaja Veerendra Vikramadevan^{P}	Prabhas		Prabhas
Bhallaladeva	Rana Daggubati	Rana Daggubati	Rana Daggubati
Sivagami	Ramya Krishnan	Ramya Krishnan	Ramya Krishnan
Devasena	Anushka Shetty	Anushka Shetty	Anushka Shetty
Avantika / Chandi	Tamannaah Bhatia	Tamannaah Bhatia	Tamannaah Bhatia
Kattappa	Sathyaraj	Sathyaraj	Sathyaraj
Bijjaladeva	Nassar	Nassar	Nassar
Sanga	Rohini	Rohini	Rohini
Jaya Varma	Meka Ramakrishna	Meka Ramakrishna	Meka Ramakrishna
Sethupathi	Rakesh Varre	Rakesh Varre	Rakesh Varre
Bhadra	Adivi Sesh	Adivi Sesh^{U}^{A}	Adivi Sesh
Kumara Varma	Subbaraju^{U}^{A}	Subbaraju	Subbaraju
Swamiji	Tanikella Bharani		Tanikella Bharani
Aslam Khan	Sudeep^{C}		
Sakethudu	Teja Kakumanu		Teja Kakumanu
Marthanda	Bharani		Bharani
Inkoshi	Prabhakar		Prabhakar
The Prime Minister of Kunthala kingdom		Prudhvi Raj	Prudhvi Raj

=== Crew ===
Occupation	Film		
Occupation	Baahubali: The Beginning (2015)	Baahubali 2: The Conclusion (2017)	Baahubali: The Epic (2025)
Director	S.S. Rajamouli	S.S. Rajamouli	S.S. Rajamouli
Producer(s)	Shobu Yarlagadda; Prasad Devineni	Shobu Yarlagadda; Prasad Devineni	Shobu Yarlagadda; Prasad Devineni
Presenter(s)	K. Raghavendra Rao (Telugu); K. E. Gnanavel Raja (Tamil); Karan Johar (Hindi)	K. Raghavendra Rao (Telugu); K. Rajarajan (Tamil); Karan Johar (Hindi)	
Line Producer	M. M. Srivalli	M. M. Srivalli	M. M. Srivalli
Dialogue Writer(s)	C.H. Vijay Kumar & Ajay Kumar (Telugu); Madhan Karky (Tamil); Mankombu Gopalakrishnan (Malayalam); Manoj Muntashir (Hindi)		
Music director(s)	M. M. Keeravani	M. M. Keeravani	M. M. Keeravani
Cinematography	K. K. Senthil Kumar	K. K. Senthil Kumar	K. K. Senthil Kumar
Editor(s)	Kotagiri Venkateswara Rao; Avid Editor: Thammiraju; International Version Editor: Vincent Tabaillon		
Production Designer	Sabu Cyril	Sabu Cyril	Sabu Cyril
Visual Effects Supervisor(s)	V. Srinivas Mohan	R. C. Kamalakannan	V. Srinivas Mohan; R. C. Kamalakannan
Stunt Director(s)	Peter Hein; Additional Stunt: Solomon Raju; Lee Whittaker; Kaloian Vodenicharov	King Solomon; Lee Whittaker; Kaecha Kampakdee; Peter Hein (Uncredited)	Peter Hein; King Solomon; Lee Whittaker; Kaecha Kampakdee
Costume Designer(s)	Rama Rajamouli; Prashanti Tipirneni	Rama Rajamouli; Prashanti Tipirneni	Rama Rajamouli; Prashanti Tipirneni
Sound Designer(s)	P. M. Satheesh; Manoj M. Goswami	P. M. Satheesh; Manoj M. Goswami	P. M. Satheesh; Manoj M. Goswami
Distributor(s)	Arka Media Works (Telugu); Studio Green (Tamil); UV Creations (Tamil); Sri Thenandal Films (Tamil); Dharma Productions (Hindi); AA Films (Hindi); Global United Media (Malayalam)	Arka Media Works (Telugu); K Productions (Tamil); Dharma Productions (Hindi); AA Films (Hindi); Global United Media (Malayalam)	Asian Cinemas (Telugu); Vaaraahi Chalana Chitram (Telugu and Kannada); AA Films (Hindi); Studio Green (Tamil); Global United Media (Malayalam)
Production Company	Arka Media Works	Arka Media Works	Arka Media Works
CBFC Rating	U/A	U/A	U/A

== Timeline ==
Various released products below are arranged in a chronological order i.e. the order in which the various stories take place one after another in time.

#	Title	Media Format	Year of release
1	The Rise of Sivagami	Novel	2017
2	Chaturanga	Novel	2020
3	Queen of Mahishmathi	Novel	2020
4	The Lost Legends	Animated series	2017–2020
5	Crown of Blood	Animated series	2024
6	Battle of the Bold	Graphic novel	2017
7	The Beginning	Live-action feature film	2015
8	The Conclusion	Live-action feature film	2017
9	The Epic	Live-action feature film	2025
10	The Eternal War – Part 1	Animated film	2027
11	The Eternal War – Part 2	Animated film	2028

== Legacy and impact ==
The Baahubali franchise is regarded as one of the most influential films in Indian Cinema. The success of Baahubali cleared the way for more grand-scale preparations and has set modern measures for narrating, visual impacts, cinematic aspiration, budget, action sequences, and a film franchise phenomenon in Indian movies. The film inspired directors like Prashant Neel and Ayan Mukerji for making big budget action films.

The duology of Baahubali franchise started a new film movement, pan-Indian film, that is, rather than remaking the same film in various languages, they are dubbing the same film in various languages. Srivatsan S of The Hindu wrote that Telugu cinema has excelled in marketing Pan-Indian films. It primarily employed two strategies – promoting the film outside their home territory and collaborating with other regional stars for more visibility.
