= Baahubali: The Epic =

2025 Indian film by S. S. Rajamouli

- Theatrical release poster
- Directed by: S. S. Rajamouli
- Screenplay by: S. S. Rajamouli
- Story by: V. Vijayendra Prasad
- Produced by: Shobu Yarlagadda; Prasad Devineni
- Starring: Prabhas; Rana Daggubati; Anushka Shetty; Tamannaah Bhatia; Ramya Krishna; Nassar; Sathyaraj; Subbaraju; Adivi Sesh; Rohini Molleti
- Cinematography: K. K. Senthil Kumar
- Edited by: Vincent Tabaillon; Bikkina Thammiraju; Kotagiri Venkateswara Rao
- Music by: M. M. Keeravani
- Production company: Arka Media Works
- Release date: 31 October 2025
- Running time: 225 minutes
- Country: India
- Language: Telugu
- Box office: ₹52 crore (Note: Multiple references)

Baahubali: The Epic (Note: Styled in official material as bāhubāLitransl.) is a 2025 Indian Telugu-language epic action film directed by S. S. Rajamouli, who co-wrote the script with V. Vijayendra Prasad. Produced by Shobu Yarlagadda and Prasad Devineni under Arka Media Works, the film stars Prabhas in a triple roles alongside, Rana Daggubati, Anushka Shetty, Tamannaah Bhatia, Ramya Krishna, Nassar, Sathyaraj, Subbaraju and Adivi Sesh.

Released to commemorate the 10-year anniversary of Baahubali: The Beginning (2015), it is a re-edited and remastered single film version of Rajamouli's earlier two-part epic saga, The Beginning (2015) and The Conclusion (2017), combining footage from both films with technical enhancements and a previously unreleased scene. The film follows Sivudu, a young warrior raised in a tribal village, who learns of his royal heritage and aims to liberate the kingdom of Mahishmati from its oppressive ruler, his uncle. His journey involves conflicts, alliances, and revelations about the kingdom's past.

With a runtime of 225 minutes, it is one of the longest Indian films. Baahubali: The Epic was released in theatres worldwide on 31 October 2025, in premium large formats like IMAX, 4DX, Dolby Cinema, D-BOX, MX4D, PXL, ICE, EPIQ, SCREEN-X,PCX,HDR BY BARCO and INOX BIGPIX etc.Being of the only Indian films which released in over 13 different movie formats.

== Plot ==
In the beginning, injured Rajmata Sivagami Devi flees to the Amburi Village with a baby. She successfully kills the two armed soldiers sent to kill her, but drowns in the Jeevanadhi River as Amburi tribals save him. Tribal woman Sanga adopts the baby and names him Shivudu, who grows up curious about the Jeevanadhi's waterfall, which flows from the top of the neighboring mountain. After spending years trying and failing to climb it, he finally succeeds when motivated to find the owner of a mask he finds from the falls. He finds her to be Avanthika, a member of the Kuntala Rebels, who are determined to overthrow the tyrannical King Bhallaladeva of Mahishmati, who holds the former Kuntala princess Devasena prisoner. After spying on, meeting, and decorating Avanthika's body, Shivudu earns her trust and offers to fulfill her mission for her to keep her out of danger from Mahishmati soldiers. Days later, he storms the kingdom and frees Devasena, but he's pursued by Bhallaladeva's adopted son, Bhadrudu, and the slave warrior general, Kattappa. The Amburis and Rebels meet up to help Shivudu, who kills Bhadrudu. When rain washes the mud off Shivudu's face, Kattappa recognizes him as "Baahubali".

Kattappa calls for a truce the next day to explain that Shivudu's birth name is Mahendra, and he's the son of Mahishmati crown prince Amarendra Baahubali. Decades earlier, Amarendra was orphaned after his parents died, so Sivagami and her power-hungry husband, Prince Bijjaladeva (who was denied the throne by his father in favor of Amarendra's father), adopted him, despite Bijjaladeva's reluctance. This makes Sivagami's son, Bhallaladeva, extremely jealous, as he grows up to be greedy, violent, and power-hungry for the throne. Sivagami and the people strongly prefer Baahubali. When they become adults, a traitor, Sakithan, sells the kingdom out to the barbaric Kalakeya Tribe, led by Chief Inkoshi. Since the princes are equal in combat skill and leadership, Bijjaladeva demands that the victor who kills Inkoshi be crowned king. In the ensuing war, both princes violently kill several Kalakeya soldiers, though Bhallaladeva does so by killing his own men and civilians. Although he kills Inkoshi, Baahubali is awarded the throne for valiantly motivating his soldiers and saving as many civilians as he can. Baahubali and Kattappa venture out to outer villages and neighboring kingdoms to learn about their lifestyles, and while Bhallaldeva seemingly accepts his mother's decision, he stews with envy, and upon finding out from spies that Baahubali has feelings for Devasena of Kuntala, he convinces Sivagami to promise to make Devasena his bride. Devasena, feeling insulted by the Mahishmati prince attempting to bribe her with riches, rejects him, favoring Baahubali, who helps save Kuntala from invading Pindari bandits. Baahubali escorts Devasena to Mahishmati, where he condemns Sivagami for promising Bhallaladeva's marriage to Devasena without Devasena's consent. For questioning her judgment, Sivagami allows Baahubali and Devasena to marry, but rewards Bhallaladeva with the throne against the people's wishes.

Bhallaladeva creates tension by firing Baahubali as the army general and ordering his friend Sethupathi to grope Devasena. Baahubali kills Sethupathi for the humiliation of Devasena, and Sivagami punishes him and Devasena for treason with exile. Even during exile, however, Baahubali continues to be favored by the people, so Bijjaladeva frames Baahubali for an assassination attempt by tricking Devasena's brother-in-law Kumara Varma into attempting to kill Bhallaladeva, considering the king a life threat to Baahubali. Kumara Varma proceeds to enter the castle with his soldiers with the help of Bijjaladeva, even though all of his soldiers are killed by Bhallaladeva's soldiers, but Kumara Varma manages to kill Bhallaladeva's soldiers at the cost of being slashed multiple times. To his shock, Bijjaladeva then kills Kumara after Bijjaladeva scars Bhallaladeva's face to make it look like Kumara Varma tried to kill him, convincing Sivagami that the assassination attempt was actually ordered by Baahubali, and so Kattappa is ordered to execute Baahubali. He stages his own alleged execution as bait, and he and Baahubali are ambushed by Inkoshi's brother. Despite winning, Kattappa stabs Baahubali and begs for his forgiveness. Shortly after Baahubali forgives Kattappa and bleeds out, Bhallaladeva arrives and brags about framing Baahubali for treason, which Kattappa informs Sivagami of. Devasena arrives with her newborn baby to hear the news, and Sivagami names him Mahendra, proclaiming him to be the new and rightful king. Wanting no opposition, Bhallaladeva arrests Kattappa and Devasena and shoots Sivagami in the back while she escapes with Mahendra.

In the present, an adult Mahendra learns that Sivagami died saving him, and is determined to make Bhallaladeva pay for his actions. He leads an army of both Kuntala and village rebels against Mahishmati, and after a violent invasion and a duel in which many soldiers from Mahendra Baahubali's side including Devasena's brother Jaya Varma being killed by Bhallaladeva, Mahendra proceeds to defeat Bhallaladeva and restrains him to a pyre that Devasena built in her captivity, allowing her to light him on fire, burning him to death after twenty-five years of cruel oppression as Mahendra, Kattappa, Avanthika, the soldiers and a helpless Bijjaladeva watch. The next day, Mahendra is crowned the rightful king and pledges loyalty to righteously serve the people.

== Cast ==
=== Credited ===
- Prabhas in triple roles as:
  - Amarendra Baahubali, Mahendra Baahubali's father, Sivagami's adopted son/nephew, and Devasena's husband
  - Mahendra Baahubali "Sivudu", Amarendra Baahubali's and Devasena's son,
  - Maharaja Veerendra Vikramadeva, former king of Mahishmathi (photo presence)
- Rana Daggubati as Bhallaladeva, Amarendra Baahubali's adopted/cousin brother, Sivagami and Bijjaladeva's son
- Anushka Shetty as Devasena
- Sathyaraj as Karikala Kattappa Nadaar
- Ramya Krishna as Sivagami Devi
- Tamannaah Bhatia as Avanthika, Kunthala rebel
- Nassar as Bijjaladeva
- Subbaraju as Kumara Varma
- Adivi Sesh as Bhadrudu
- Rohini Molleti as Sanga
- Meka Ramakrishna as Jaya Varma, Kunthala king turned rebel leader
- Tanikella Bharani as Swami
- Prabhakar as Inkoshi, leader of the Kalakeya tribe
- Rakesh Varre as Sethupathi
- Charandeep as Inkoshi's brother
- Kalpa Latha as an inhabitant
- Prudhvi Raj as Mahamantri
- Chalapathi Rao as Priest
- Ramaraju
- Teja Kakumanu as Saketudu
- Bharani Shankar as Marthandhudu
- Ayyappa P. Sharma as Royal Priest
- Sri Simha as Kunthala rebel
- Kaala Bhairava as Singer (appeared at bhallaladeva's statue inauguration)
- SS Karthikeya as a Mahishmathi soldier who came to kill Sivagami but was killed by Sivagami
- SS Rajamouli as Narrator

== Production ==
The original two-part Baahubali films, directed by S. S. Rajamouli and produced by Arka Media Works, are among India's highest-grossing films. The saga, starring Prabhas as Amarendra and Mahendra Baahubali, gained widespread popularity in India and internationally. In July 2025, Rajamouli announced a single-film version to mark the franchise's tenth anniversary.

The film combines both parts of the original saga with a remastered score by M. M. Keeravani. Some scenes, including the romantic sequence, the song "Kannaa Nidurinchara" and few other songs, were removed, while a previously unreleased scene was added. The post-production of the film was done at Annapurna Studios, and the Central Board of Film Certification (CBFC) issued a U/A 16+ certificate, with the film having a running time of 3 hours and 44 minutes. Unlike the first film, the original language of this combined cut is only Telugu.

== Release ==
=== Theatrical ===
Baahubali: The Epic was pre-released in select theatres in the United States, the United Kingdom and Ireland on 29 October 2025, followed by a worldwide theatrical release on 31 October 2025, in premium large formats, including IMAX, 4DX, D-Box, ScreenX, ICE, PCX, Dolby Cinema and EPIQ, subject to theatre availability. It was released in Telugu, Hindi, Tamil, Kannada and Malayalam languages.

=== Distribution ===
The film was distributed across various regions by multiple companies. Vaaraahi Chalana Chitram managed distribution in Andhra Pradesh and Karnataka. Asian Suresh Entertainment handled distribution in the Nizam region. AA Films distributed in North India and select international territories. Variance Films and Prathyangira Cinemas distributed the film in North America and Canada, while Carlotta Films covered France and Movie Twin handled distribution in Japan and Forum Films in Australia, New Zealand, Fiji Islands and Century Films in Kerala and KVN Productions in Karnataka.

=== Marketing ===
Teasers, trailer and posters released in August 2025 highlighted upgraded visual effects and Dolby Atmos sound. A 10th-anniversary event in Hyderabad was attended by Prabhas, Rana Daggubati, S. S. Rajamouli and M. M. Keeravani. The announcement generated significant attention, with fans expressing excitement on social media under the hashtag #BaahubaliTheEpic.

=== Home media ===
The digital streaming rights were reportedly acquired by JioHotstar and Netflix. The Hindi version of the film began streaming on Netflix from 25 December 2025.

== Reception ==
=== Critical response ===
On the review aggregator website Rotten Tomatoes, 100% of 13 critics' reviews are positive, with an average rating of 7.7/10. Metacritic, which uses a weighted average, assigned the film a score of 79 out of 100, based on 4 critics, indicating "generally favorable" reviews. Prior to its release, Entertainment Weekly described the film as "a bold cinematic experiment" due to its runtime and scope.

=== Box office ===
Trade analysts expected strong performance due to the franchise's popularity. Baahubali: The Epic grossed between ₹50–75 million in India and between ₹80–110 million worldwide on its opening day. By the second day the film collected ₹130 million (US$1.4 million) worldwide.
