= Jin Yamanoi =

Japanese voice actor

- 山野井 仁
- Born: Hitoshi Yamanoi (山野井仁; November 16, 1962 (age 63); Tokyo, Japan
- Occupation: Voice actor
- Years active: 1990s-present
- Agent: Kakehi Production
- Spouse: Tomoe Hanba

Jin Yamanoi (山野井 仁, Yamanoi Jin; born November 16, 1962) is a Japanese voice actor from Tokyo, Japan. He has voiced a number of roles originally played by David Harbour and Eric Bana. He also voiced Ghostface in the Scream series.

== Biography ==
Born Hitoshi Yamanoi on November 16, 1962, in Tokyo. He attended Joetsu University of Education before joining the Situation Theater Company after finishing. At the beginning of his career, he was a kindergarten, 1st grade, and 2nd grade teacher.

Yamanoi has skills in gymnastics and kendo. He is married to voice actress Tomoe Hanba.

== Voice roles ==
Year	Title (in English)	Title (in nihongo)	Role	Notes	Ref
1995	Fushigi Yuugi	ふしぎ遊戯	Tatara		
1995	Juuni Senshi Bakuretsu Eto Ranger	十二戦支 爆烈エトレンジャー	Drago		
1996	Brave Command Dagwon	勇者指令ダグオン	Sawamura Shin		
1996	Case Closed	名探偵コナン	Various characters		
1996	Those Who Hunt Elves	エルフを狩るモノたち	Anago Pirate	Ep. 1	
1997	Wild Cardz	Jaja馬!カルテット	You Jinbo		
1998	Lost Universe	ロスト・ユニバース	Terrorist	Ep. 8	
1999	Seraphim Call	セラフィムコール	Police officer	Ep. 8	
1999	Hunter × Hunter	HUNTER×HUNTER	Zepile		
2000	Gate Keepers	ゲートキーパーズ	Teacher		
2000	NieA_7	ニアアンダーセブン	Butcher		
2001	Hellsing	HELLSING	Jack	Ep. 1	
2001	Kamen Rider Agito	仮面ライダーアギト	Jaguar Lord/Pantheras Luteus (ep 1), Jaguar Lord/Pantheras Albus (ep 1 – 2), Jaguar Lord/Pantheras Tristis (ep 1 – 2), Sea urchin Lord/Echinus Famelicare (ep 28)	Ep. 1–2, 28; tokusatsu	
2002	Transformers: Armada	超ロボット生命体トランスフォーマー マイクロン伝説	Shockwave, Starscream		
2002	Witch Hunter Robin	Witch Hunter ROBIN	Nagira		
2002	Kamen Rider Ryuki	仮面ライダー龍騎	Dispider Reborn	Ep. 2; tokusatsu	
1998–2003	Oz	Chris Keller	Christopher Meloni		
2003–2004	Stairway to Heaven	Taehwa			
2003	Matriculated	アニマトリックス	Chyron		
2004	Mars Daybreak	絢爛舞踏祭 ザ･マーズ･デイブレイク	Yagami		
2004	Wonderful Life	ワンダフルライフ	Narrator		
2005	Gun × Sword	ガン × ソード	Dr. Dennehy	Ep. 4	
2006	Ray the Animation	RAY THE ANIMATION	H-ring man		
2008	Code Geass (season 2)	コードギアス 反逆のルルーシュ R2	Odysseus eu Britannia		
2008	Resident Evil: Degeneration	バイオハザード：ディジェネレーション	Leon S. Kennedy		
2009	Ristorante Paradiso	リストランテ・パラディーゾ	Claudio		
2009	Stitch!	スティッチ!	Genta, Jun's father	Ep. 16	
2011	Iron Man	アイアンマン	Ramon Zero/Captain Nagato Sakurai		
2018	Baahubali: The Lost Legends		Bhallaladeva		
2018	Overlord II	オーバーロード	Tsaindorcus Vaision		
2019	Obsolete	オブソリート	Loewner		
2021	The Saint's Magic Power is Omnipotent	聖女の魔力は万能です	Siegfried Salutania		
2017–2022	Saiyuki	最遊記	Dokugakuji	Reload Blast (2017); Zeroin (2022)	
2024	I Parry Everything	俺は全てを【パリイ】する ～逆勘違いの世界最強は冒険者の夢をみる～	King Clays		
2025	The Rose of Versailles	ベルサイユのばら	Colonel d'Agoult	Film	
2026	Suikoden: The Anime	幻想水滸伝	Agares Blight		
?	21st century Noah's Ark		Narrator	NHK	

=== Video games ===
Year	Title (in English)	Title (in nihongo)	Type	Role	Ref
1996	Soul Edge	ソウルエッジ	Li Long	PlayStation, Also. Ver II arcade	
1997	Shinshuku Taisen It's a Nonii!		Dona, Kitchomu	PlayStation	
1998	Legend of Legaia	レガイア伝説	Gala		
1998	Kojin Kyouju		Akira Matsuda	PlayStation	
2001	Capcom vs. SNK 2 EO	カプコン バーサス エス・エヌ・ケイ 2 ミリオネア ファイティング 2001	Eagle, Rolento	GameCube, PS2, Xbox	
2006	Wild Arms 5	ワイルドアームズ ザ フィフスヴァンガード	Fereydoon	PS2	
2012	Street Fighter X Tekken	ストリートファイター X 鉄拳	Rolento	PC, PS Vita, PS3, Xbox 360	
2014	Ultra Street Fighter IV	ウルトラストリートファイターIV	Rolento	PC, PS3, Xbox 360	

=== Dubbing ===
Orig. year	Title (in English)	Title (in nihongo)	Role	Notes	Ref
1963	From Russia with Love	Donald "Red" Grant	Robert Shaw		
1974	The Godfather Part II	Vito Corleone	Robert de Niro		
1986	A Better Tomorrow	Shing's Right-Hand Man	Shing Fui-On		
1987	The Untouchables	George Stone / Giuseppe Petri	Andy García		
1992	Cronos	Angel de la Guardia	Ron Perlman		
1996	Scream	Ghostface	Roger L. Jackson		
1997	L.A. Confidential	Bud	Russell Crowe	2001 Fuji TV edition	
1997	Scream 2	Ghostface	Roger L. Jackson		
1997	Tomorrow Never Dies	Charles Robinson	Colin Salmon		
1998	Saving Private Ryan	Private First Class Adrian Caparzo	Vin Diesel		
1999	Boys Don't Cry	Marvin 'Tom' Nissen	Brendan Sexton III		
1999	The Messenger: The Story of Joan of Arc	John II, Duke of Alençon	Pascal Greggory		
1999	Virus	Richie Mason	Sherman Augustus		
2000	Red Planet	Ted Santen	Benjamin Bratt		
2000	Scream 3	Ghostface	Roger L. Jackson		
2001	Band of Brothers	Carwood Lipton	Donnie Wahlberg		
2001	Black Hawk Down	Norm "Hoot" Gibson	Eric Bana		
2002	Blue Crush	Matt Tollman	Matthew Davis		
2002	Femme Fatale	Racine	Édouard Montoute		
2002	Narc	Henry Oak	Ray Liotta		
2002	One Hour Photo	Det. James Van Der Zee	Eriq La Salle		
2002	Phone Booth	Capt. Ed Ramey	Forest Whitaker		
2003	S.W.A.T.	Officer III Deacon "Deke" Kay	LL Cool J		
2003	Tears of the Sun	Johnny Kelly	Johnny Messner		
2004	Alfie	Marlon	Omar Epps		
2004	Anacondas: The Hunt for the Blood Orchid	Gordon Mitchell	Morris Chestnut		
2005	Corpse Bride	Lord Barkis Bittern	Richard E. Grant		
2006	300	Dilios	David Wenham		
2006	Idiocracy	President Dwayne Elizondo Mountain Dew Herbert Camacho	Terry Crews		
2006	Silent Hill	Christopher Da Silva	Sean Bean		
2006	Smokin' Aces	Donald Carruthers	Ray Liotta		
2007	Transformers	Robert Epps	Tyrese Gibson		
2008	American Crude	Spinks	Michael Clarke Duncan		
2008	The Dark Knight	Sal Maroni	Eric Roberts		
2008	The Fifth Commandment	Miles Templeton	Bokeem Woodbine		
2008	Get Smart	Air Marshall	Bill Romanowski	2011 TV Asahi edition	
2008	Gran Torino	Mitch Kowalski	Brian Haley		
2008	Gunman in Joseon	Choi Won-shin	Yu Oh-seong		
2008	Pathology	Dr. Jake Gallo	Michael Weston		
2008	Seven Pounds	Ben Thomas	Will Smith		
2008	WALL-E	SECUR-T	Teddy Newton		
2008–2009	Terroir	Kang Taemin	Kim Joo-hyuk		
2009	Armored	Palmer	Amaury Nolasco		
2009	Star Trek	Captain Nero	Eric Bana		
2009	Transformers: Revenge of the Fallen	Robert Epps	Tyrese Gibson		
2009	The Ugly Truth	Mike Chadway	Gerard Butler		
2009	Universal Soldier: Regeneration	Commander Topov	Zahari Baharov		
2010	The Bounty Hunter	Milo Boyd	Gerard Butler		
2010	Brooklyn's Finest	Casanova "Caz" Phillips	Wesley Snipes		
2010	Cyrus	John Kilpatrick	John C. Reilly		
2010	Going the Distance	Box Saunders	Jason Sudeikis		
2011	Carnage	Michael Longstreet	John C. Reilly		
2011	The Hangover Part II	Mike Tyson			
2011	Scream 4	Ghostface	Roger L. Jackson		
2011	Take Shelter	Curtis LaForche	Michael Shannon		
2011	The Thing	Sam Carter	Joel Edgerton		
2011	Transformers: Dark of the Moon	Robert Epps	Tyrese Gibson		
2003–2012	One Tree Hill	Dan Scott	Paul Johansson		
2007–2012	Chuck	John Casey	Adam Baldwin		
2012	Act of Valor	Rorke James Engel	Rorke Denver		
2012	Battleship	Captain Browley	Rico McClinton		
2012	The Five-Year Engagement	Tom Solomon	Jason Segel		
2012	Silent Hill: Revelation	Christopher Da Silva	Sean Bean		
2012	Small Apartments	Dr. Sage Mennox	Dolph Lundgren		
2012	Snow White and the Huntsman	Duir	Eddie Marsan		
2008–2013	Fringe	Phillip Broyles	Lance Reddick		
2013	Firestorm	Jackal	Michael Wong		
2013	The Internship	Billy McMahon	Vince Vaughn		
2013	Lone Survivor	Erik S. Kristensen	Eric Bana		
2013	New World	Lee Joong-gu	Park Sung-woong		
2013	We're the Millers	David Clark	Jason Sudeikis		
2014	300: Rise of an Empire	Dilios	David Wenham		
2014	The Connection	Pierre Michel	Jean Dujardin		
2014	From Vegas to Macau	Detective	Michael Wong		
2014	Planes: Fire & Rescue	Windlifter	Wes Studi		
2014	Testament of Youth	Mr. Brittain	Dominic West		
2000–2015	CSI: Crime Scene Investigation	Warrick Brown	Gary Dourdan		
2015	Baahubali: The Beginning	Bhallaladeva	Rana Daggubati		
2015	Blackhat	Deputy United States Marshal Jessup	Holt McCallany		
2015	The End of the Tour	David Foster Wallace	Jason Segel		
2015	The Good Dinosaur	Poppa Henry	Jeffrey Wright		
2016–present	Stranger Things	Jim Hopper	David Harbour		
2016	13 Hours: The Secret Soldiers of Benghazi	Tyrone S. Woods	James Badge Dale		
2016	The BFG	The Fleshlumpeater	Jemaine Clement		
2016	The Last Princess	Han Taek-soo	Yoon Je-moon		
2016	Storks	Beta	Jordan Peele		
2016	When the Bough Breaks	John Taylor	Morris Chestnut		
2015–2017	Safe House	DCI Mark Maxwell	Paterson Joseph		
2015–2017	The Strain	Vasility Fet	Kevin Durand	Season 3 onwards	
2017	Baahubali 2: The Conclusion	Bhallaladeva	Rana Daggubati		
2017	China Salesman	Kabbah	Mike Tyson		
2017	An Inconvenient Sequel: Truth to Power	Al Gore			
2017	Primeval	Tim Manfrey	Dominic Purcell		
2017	Sleepless	Doug Dennison	David Harbour		
2018	Sicario: Day of the Soldado	Matt Graver	Josh Brolin		
2019–present	The Hot Zone	Lt. Col. Jerry Jaax	Noah Emmerich		
2019	The Art of Self-Defense	Sensei	Alessandro Nivola		
2019	Breakthrough	Dr. Garrett	Dennis Haysbert		
2019	Hellboy	Hellboy	David Harbour		
2019	Lucy in the Sky	Frank Paxton	Colman Domingo		
2019	Richard Jewell	FBI Agent Tom Shaw	Jon Hamm		
2019	Shazam!	Shazam	Djimon Hounsou	2021 THE CINEMA edition	
2019	True Detective (season 3)	Wayne Hays	Mahershala Ali		
2019	Wings Over Everest	James	Noah Danby		
2020	My Spy	JJ	Dave Bautista		
2020	Skylines	General Radford	Alexander Siddig		
2018–2021	Black Lightning	Inspector Bill Henderson	Damon Gupton		
2021	Godzilla vs. Kong	Admiral Wilcox	Hakeem Kae-Kazim		
2021	Halloween Kills	Tommy Doyle	Anthony Michael Hall		
2021	Spider-Man: No Way Home	Julius Dell	J. B. Smoove		
2022	DC League of Super-Pets	Superman	John Krasinski		
2022	Decision to Leave	Im Ho-shin	Park Yong-woo		
2013–2023	The Blacklist	Harold Cooper	Harry Lennix		
2023	Ahsoka	Grand Admiral Thrawn	Lars Mikkelsen		
2023	Scream VI	Ghostface	Roger L. Jackson		
2024	Wanted Man	Detective Travis Johansen	Dolph Lundgren		
