= Baahubali: Crown of Blood =

Indian animated television series

- Genre: Animation; Action
- Created by: Sharad Devarajan; S. S. Rajamouli
- Based on: Characters by V. Vijayendra Prasad and S. S. Rajamouli
- Written by: Sharad Devarajan; Sarwat Chaddha; Jeevan J. Kang; Shivangi Singh
- Directed by: Jeevan J. Kang; Navin John
- Country of origin: India
- Original language: Hindi
- No. of seasons: 1
- No. of episodes: 9

Production
- Editor: Tharun Prasad
- Running time: 19 - 28 minutes
- Production company: Graphic India

Original release
- Network: Disney+ Hotstar
- Release: 17 May – 4 July 2024

Baahubali: Crown of Blood is an Indian television animated series that is a part of the Bahubali franchise, produced by Graphic India. It was premiered and released on 17 May 2024 on Disney+ Hotstar.

== Synopsis ==
Set before the events of the films, this prequel follows Baahubali and Bhallaladeva as they unite to protect their kingdom, Mahishmati, and its throne from the looming danger of Raktadeva, a mysterious and powerful warlord.

== Characters ==
- Amarendra Baahubali – Bahubali is a boisterous young prince of the Mahishmati kingdom and the son of former king Vikramadeva. He is a skilled warrior who cares deeply about the people in his kingdom.
- Bhallaldeva – He's the son of Queen Shivagami and Lord Bijjaladeva. He is also a contender for the throne and wants to rule the kingdom with an iron fist.
- Sivagami – She is the mother of Bhallaldeva and the wife of Bijjaladeva. Raises Bahubali as her own son. She rules over the kingdom since Vikramadeva's death but never occupies the throne herself.
- Kattappa – He is an exceptional warrior and a loyal commander of the Mahishmati kingdom's army. He often comes to the rescue of people in trouble, be it Mahishmati subjects or the royal family itself.
- Bijjaladeva – He is the father of Bhallaldeva and the husband of Shivagami. Motivated by greed and power, he wants his son to succeed and claim the throne and doesn't fancy Baahubali at all.
- Rakthadeva - He is the enemy of Mahishmati Kingdom and tries to defeat.

== Episodes ==
| No. in season | Title | Original release date |
|---|---|---|
| 1 | "Return to Mahishmati" | 17 May 2024 |
| 2 | "Kattappa's Exile" | 17 May 2024 |
| 3 | "Shattered Oath" | 23 May 2024 |
| 4 | "Wolves on the hunt" | 30 May 2024 |
| 5 | "Battle of Titans" | 6 June 2024 |
| 6 | "Dark Secrets" | 13 June 2024 |
| 7 | "From the Rubble" | 20 June 2024 |
| 8 | "The Black Forge" | 27 June 2024 |
| 9 | "Rage of Demon Lord" | 4 July 2024 |

== Production ==
S. S. Rajamouli announced the series on 1 May 2024 by sharing a video revealing the title on X. The trailer of the series released on 2 May 2024. The series is produced by Graphic India and it is created by S. S. Rajamouli and Sharad Devarajan.

== Reception ==
=== Critical reception ===
The series mostly received mixed reviews from critics. The Hindu wrote: "The animation and the writing needed more punch" The Times Of India rated 3.5 out of 5 stars and wrote: "SS Rajamouli’s animated series adds another thrilling chapter to epic 'Baahubali Saga' India Today rated 2.5 out of 5 and wrote: "SS Rajamouli's animated show lacks new ideas".

=== Viewership ===
As of 7 June 2024 it is ranked as Top 10 show of Disney+ Hotstar.
