= Baahubali =

Baahubali (Hindi: बाहुबली, romanized: Bāhubalī) may refer to:

- Bahubali, a god in Jainism
- Baahubali (franchise), Indian media franchise
