= Baahubali: The Lost Legends =

Indian animated television series

- Genre: Action
- Created by: SS Rajamouli; Sharad Devarajan
- Based on: Characters by V. Vijayendra Prasad and S. S. Rajamouli
- Written by: Ashwin Pande
- Story by: SS Rajamouli; Sharad Devarajan; Jeevan J. Kang; Ashwin Pande
- Voices of: Viraj Adhav; Manoj Pandey; Manini Mishra; Samay Raj Thakkar; Aditya Raj; Deepak Sinha; Aaditya Raaj Sharma; Sumit Kaul; Sonal Kaushal; Vinod Kulkarni
- Country of origin: India
- Original languages: Hindi; English
- No. of seasons: 5
- No. of episodes: 71 (+1 special episode)

Production
- Editor: Ashish Avin
- Running time: 25 minutes
- Production companies: Arka Media Works; Graphic India

Original release
- Network: Amazon Prime Video
- Release: 19 April 2017 – 10 April 2020

Baahubali: The Lost Legends is an Indian television animated series that is a part of the Baahubali franchise, produced by Arka Media Works and Graphic India. The series revolves around the young princes Amarendra Baahubali and Bhallaladeva in the Mahishmati kingdom. The series serves as a prologue to Baahubali: The Beginning and Baahubali 2: The Conclusion. The first season aired on Amazon Prime Video from 19 April to 11 August 2017.

== Plot ==
Baahubali - The Lost Legends is set before the Kalakeya invasion depicted in the movie, when Baahubali and Bhallaladeva are still both young princes of Mahishmati. It chronicles two brothers competing to rule the greatest kingdom of its age and the epic adventures they must endure to prove they are worthy to one day wear the crown. Under the watchful eye of Sivagami, and the slave warrior, Kattappa, one shall rise to be King of the throne, while the other shall become King of the people. The animated series features new, never before revealed stories about the characters from the film including Prince Baahubali, Bhallaladeva, Kattappa and Sivagami, as well as dozens of new characters.

The series follows princes and cousins Amarendra Baahubali and Bhallaladeva, who work to defend the kingdom of Mahishmati from the forces of evil.

== Production ==
The animated series was created by S. S. Rajamouli, Sharad Devarajan and Arka Mediaworks, who are all Producers, along with Jeevan J. Kang, Graphic India's EVP Creative and the lead character designer for the animated series, along with Graphic India's senior animation writer, Ashwin Pande.

== Characters ==
- Amarendra Baahubali – Baahubali is a boisterous young prince of the Mahishmati kingdom and the son of former king Vikramadeva. He is a skilled warrior who cares deeply about the people in his kingdom.
- Bhallaldeva – He's the son of Queen Shivagami and Lord Bijjaladeva. He is also a contender for the throne and wants to rule the kingdom with an iron fist.
- Sivagami – She is the mother of Bhallaldeva and the wife of Bijjaladeva. She rules over the kingdom since Vikramadeva's death but never occupies the throne herself.
- Kattappa – He is an exceptional warrior and a loyal commander of the Mahishmati kingdom's army. He often comes to the rescue of people in trouble, be it Mahishmati subjects or the royal family itself.
- Bijjaladeva – He is the father of Bhallaldeva and the husband of Shivagami. Motivated by greed and power, he wants his son to succeed and claim the throne and doesn't fancy Baahubali at all.
- Pradhan Guru – He is a mysterious character who shows up to be the royal teacher. He is an extremely skilled fighter and eqaully as cunning and resourcefull. His ulterior motives against Mahishmati ultimately lead to his demise at the hands of Kattappa
- Yadhuvanshi – The King of Rudragni and ally of Mahismati who is ultimately killed by his daughter, Princess Yamagni in a plot hatched by his son Prince Varaah. When he first appears, he is an old and sick man.
- Varaah – Varaah was the King of the Rudragni Kingdom. He was a vicious and ruthless ruler who only yearned for power and wealth. After having his father, King Yadhuvanshi killed by his sister he quickly usurps the throne. He despises the Mahismati and the royal family, but is jealous of their wealth and power. His hidden family consisting of fisherwoman and son are used by Bhallaldeva as leverage in his bid for the throne. His alliance with Dharmraj ultimately leads to his death when he is stabbed by his sister Yamagani.
- Yamagni – Yamagni is the sister of Varaah and the Queen of the Rudragni Kingdom. Unlike her brother, she is a kind-hearted and brave person, and lover of Bahubali. Yamagni is responsible for the death of her father, King Yadhuvanshi. Yamagni also reluctantly struck up a deal with Pradan Guru to help her become the ruler of Rudragni. Rajmata Shivgami learns of her betryal and blackmails her to cut all ties with Bahubali. She later kills her brother Varaah and becomes the Queen.
- Aakansh – He is a good friend of both the princes, Bahubali and Bhallaladeva. Bhallaladeva's hatred for him ends with his death in Amaram Kingdom.
- Sujata – Sujata is the intelligent inventor of Jwalarajyam Kingdom, a kingdom known for its large library which holds all the knowledge of the world. In the process of defending Jwalarajyam, Bahubali befriends Sujata. She proves to an asset to Mahishmati and Bahubali numerous times.
- Dharmraj – Dharmraj is the self-proclaimed son of Jayadeva, the alleged elder brother of King Somadeva; however, his false stories are exposed, and he is overthrown.
- Zoravar – Zoravar is the slave-turned-king of Barigaza who faced many hurdles and overcame many opponents to assemble a large army and hold a position of power. He is a compassionate and kind king who is impressed with Bahubali's valor and becomes Mahishmati's ally. He has a wife, Ranaka Devi, and a son, Karan Singh.
- Mahabali – Mahabali is the leader of an unnamed tribe in the northern mountains and an old friend of Kattappa. He later retires and places his son Bheemdutt as the leader.
- Kalpana Devi – Kalpana Devi is the Queen of Agartha Kingdom. She was a vagabond in her early life until King Shrutsen of Agartha falls in love with her. He teaches Kalpana everything he knows about combat and war strategy. After King Shrutsen is betrayed by his ministers who allied with Bijjaladeva, she vows to never let Mahismati misuse its power again. Her army only consists of warrior women. She wields the Hachiman which belonged to Shrutsen. She has previously massacred many kingdoms, including Amaram, Kalekeyas, and Zoraver's army. She commands Shivagami to crown Bahubali the King so nobody has to suffer like Agartha under the might of Mahismati. Kalpana Devi dies an honorable death at the hands of Shivgami in battle. Her dying wish was that the Hachiman be returned to Nippon.
- Paramhans – Paramhans is the king of Amaram Kingdom and commander of the most skilled and disciplined warriors. He is an ally of Mahishmati (by striking a viciou deal with Bhallaladeva) and wants to take revenge on Bahubali who caused his son's death in a fight to save Aakanksh. Paramhans and his kingdom are later destroyed by Kalpana Devi.
- Kaalakhanjar – He was the vicious leader of the Sea Pirates and a legend among seamen. After the birth of his daughter Ayesha he changes his way and loots only to support his island community of outcasts. He dies at the hands of his irascible daughter. In his dying breath he proclaims his daughter to be the next Kalakhanjar.
- Ayesha – Ayesha the daughter of Kaalakhanjar, succeeds her father as the leader of Sea Pirates after accidentally killing him. She holds Bahubali responble for Kaalakhanjar's death and forms and alliance with Kalpana Devi to destroy Mahishmati and Bahubali. However, after coming to terms with herself and Bahubali's good nature she befriends him again.
- Madam Koi – Koi was an opportunistic lady who kidnapped children of the country side to serve her as slaves and to extract ransom from the parents. She took advantage of the lawlessness of the ravaged lands to take over a small castle with her band of goons. Bahubali and Bhalladeva infiltrate her grounds with the help of the villagers and resuce the children.
- King Torra – King Torra was one of the two warlords of Nippon, and the enemy of warlord Okami. He used to be a just and kind King until the war with Okami drove him to attack and loot his own subjects. Like Okami he wants to obtain the legendary Hachiman. He even struck his son when he questioned his father's cruel ways. His 20 year long stalemate with Okami has driven Nippon into desolation. He is killed by Okami in a final fight.
- King Okami – King Okami was the other warlord of Nippon, and the enemy of Torra. He was a cruel and merciless ruler who used Shinobis for his dirty work. As the other member of the stalemate, he also ravaged the country and wants to acquire the Hachiman. He is killed by Torra in a final fight.
- Shinji/Karasu – Shinji is the long-lost son of Torra. The former had left Torra because the latter had attacked him in a rage when he was a child. Shinji later adopts the name Karasu San and becomes the leader of the Tengu tribe of Shinobis. He also befriends Bahubali, and later becomes the King of Nippon, wielding the Hachiman Sword.
- Kensai – Kensai was an extremely skilled swordsman who travelled the world to spar with other great warriors. He wielded the legendary Katana Hachiman. Kensai served under Torra as a Samurai while he battled with his soul and external code of honour as he watched his leader become a merciless killer. He eventually leaves Torra when he strikes Shinji and sends the Hachiman to King Shrutsen of Agartha.

== Episodes ==
Season	Episodes	Originally released	
Season	Episodes	First released	Last released
1	13	April 19, 2017	August 4, 2017
Special	1	July 21, 2017	
2	13	February 16, 2018	
3	13	April 28, 2018	
4	16	April 10, 2019	
5	16	April 10, 2020	

=== Season 1 (2017) ===
No. overall	No. in season	Title	Original release date
1	1	"Legend Begins"	19 April 2017
2	2	"The Royal Visit"	19 May 2017
3	3	"The Royal Visit"	26 May 2017
4	4	"Blood for Blood"	2 June 2017
5	5	"Tiger by the Tail"	9 June 2017
6	6	"The Legend of Katappa"	16 June 2017
7	7	"A Secret Life"	23 June 2017
8	8	"Riot in Mahishmati"	30 June 2017
9	9	"The Blood Moon"	7 July 2017
10	10	"The Master"	14 July 2017
11	11	"The Gathering"	28 July 2017
12	12	"The Tournament of Champions"	4 August 2017
13	13	"The Tournament of Champions"	11 August 2017

=== Special (2017) ===
No. overall	No. in season	Title	Original release date
–	–	"Behind the Scenes of Baahubali: The Lost Legends"	21 July 2017

=== Season 2 (2018) ===
No. overall	No. in season	Title	Original release date
14	1	"A Royal Welcome"	16 February 2018
15	2	"The Battle of Jawalarajyam"	16 February 2018
16	3	"The Battle of Jawalarajyam"	16 February 2018
17	4	"Tyger, Tyger"	16 February 2018
18	5	"For the Life of Kattapa"	16 February 2018
19	6	"Revelations"	16 February 2018
20	7	"King of the Sea"	16 February 2018
21	8	"The Legend of Kaala Khanjar"	16 February 2018
22	9	"The Pirate's Daughter"	16 February 2018
23	10	"A Brother for a Brother"	16 February 2018
24	11	"The Burning Curse"	16 February 2018
25	12	"Kingdome on Fire"	16 February 2018
26	13	"The Great Game"	16 February 2018

=== Season 3 (2018) ===
No. overall	No. in season	Title	Original release date
27	1	"The Lost King"	28 April 2018
28	2	"Birthright"	28 April 2018
29	3	"Children of the Trees"	28 April 2018
30	4	"Village of the Lost"	28 April 2018
31	5	"The Wild Hunt"	28 April 2018
32	6	"Beast in the Dark"	28 April 2018
33	7	"Heavy is the Head"	28 April 2018
34	8	"Obsidian Blades"	28 April 2018
35	9	"The Slavers"	28 April 2018
36	10	"The Warlord of the Sands"	28 April 2018
37	11	"Desert Rose"	28 April 2018
38	12	"Broken Crown"	28 April 2018
39	13	"Revenge of the King"	28 April 2018

=== Season 4 (2019) ===
No. overall	No. in season	Title	Original release date
40	1	"Beauty's Mask"	10 April 2019
41	2	"The Eagle's Nest"	10 April 2019
42	3	"An Elephant Never Forgets"	10 April 2019
43	4	"The Bandit King"	10 April 2019
44	5	"The Bandit King"	10 April 2019
45	6	"Growing Pains"	10 April 2019
46	7	"Trapped in the Labyrinth"	10 April 2019
47	8	"The Cult"	10 April 2019
48	9	"The Cult"	10 April 2019
49	10	"The Warrior Queen"	10 April 2019
50	11	"The Lost Tribe"	10 April 2019
51	12	"A Murderer in Mahishmati"	10 April 2019
52	13	"Return of the Blades"	10 April 2019
53	14	"The Kalkeya Refugee"	10 April 2019
54	15	"The Siege of Mahshmati"	10 April 2019
55	16	"The Siege of Mahshmati"	10 April 2019

=== Season 5 (2020) ===
No. overall	No. in season	Title	Original release date
56	1	"The Land of the Rising Sun"	10 April 2020
57	2	"The Mark of Koi"	10 April 2020
58	3	"The Mark of Koi"	10 April 2020
59	4	"The Forest of Ghosts"	10 April 2020
60	5	"The Tiger and His Son"	10 April 2020
61	6	"Prisoner of the Wolf"	10 April 2020
62	7	"The Sword Saint"	10 April 2020
63	8	"Against the Ninja"	10 April 2020
64	9	"The Return"	10 April 2020
65	10	"Shikaar's Last Hunt"	10 April 2020
66	11	"Shikaar's Last Hunt"	10 April 2020
67	12	"The Magician"	10 April 2020
68	13	"Bijjaladeva's Big Day"	10 April 2020
69	14	"Code of the Samurai"	10 April 2020
70	15	"Revenge of the Ronin"	10 April 2020
71	16	"Revenge of the Ronin"	10 April 2020

== Broadcast ==
The first episode premiered on 19 April 2017 and the other episodes started streaming from 19 May onwards with a new episode releasing every Friday. Season 1 ended on 11 August 2017 with the episode "The Tournament Of Champions Part 2". Season 2 premiered on 16 February 2018 with all 13 episodes released same day, All 13 episodes of Season 3 were released on 28 April 2018 and all 16 episodes of season 4 were released on 10 April 2019. All 16 episodes of Season 5 premiered on 10 April 2020.

Colors TV acquired the television rights of the series. The series premiered on Colors on 10 December 2017. In UAE the series premiered on 5 January 2018 on Colors TV ME.

== See also ==
- List of Indian animated television series
