= Baahubali: The Torch Bearer =

- Genre: Documentary
- Created by: Vajja Krishna Chaitanya; Sriharsha Chundru; Pradeep Meka
- Starring: Various
- Music by: Kaala Bhairava
- Country of origin: India
- Original languages: Telugu; English
- No. of episodes: 4

Production
- Executive producers: Shobu Yarlagadda; Prasad Devineni; S. S. Rajamouli
- Cinematography: Suresh Sarangam
- Editor: Jay Srikar
- Running time: 24–40 minutes
- Production companies: Walls & Trends

Original release
- Network: Netflix
- Release: 26 June 2026

Baahubali: The Torch Bearer is an Indian television documentary series about the production of epic action duology Baahubali: The Beginning (2015) and Baahubali 2: The Conclusion (2017). The documentary was shot during pre-production and filming and it was intended as a "behind-the-scenes" documentary. The show is predominantly in Telugu and English and additionally features Hindi since Netflix only has streaming rights of the Hindi dubbed version.

The show was conceptualised and created by Vajja Krishna Chaitanya, Sriharsha Chundru, and Pradeep Meka of Walls & Trends. It premiered on Netflix on 26 June 2026.

== Plot ==
The show explores the origin, writing and other production phases of the two films. It also covers about how it has impacted Indian cinema and pop culture.

== Cast ==
Cast and crew members who have worked in the franchise have appeared in the show. Some of the notables inlcude:

- S. S. Rajamouli
- Prabhas
- Rana Daggubati
- Anushka Shetty
- M. M. Keeravani
- V. Vijayendra Prasad
- K. Raghavendra Rao
- Shobu Yarlagadda
- Prasad Devineni

== Episodes ==
#	Title
1	"The Dream"
2	"Building the Dream"
3	"Beyond Dreams"
4	"The Torchbearer"

== Release ==
Baahubali: The Torch Bearer was released on 26 June 2026 on Netflix.
