= P. M. Satheesh =

Indian film sound designer, sound editor and mixer

PM Satheesh
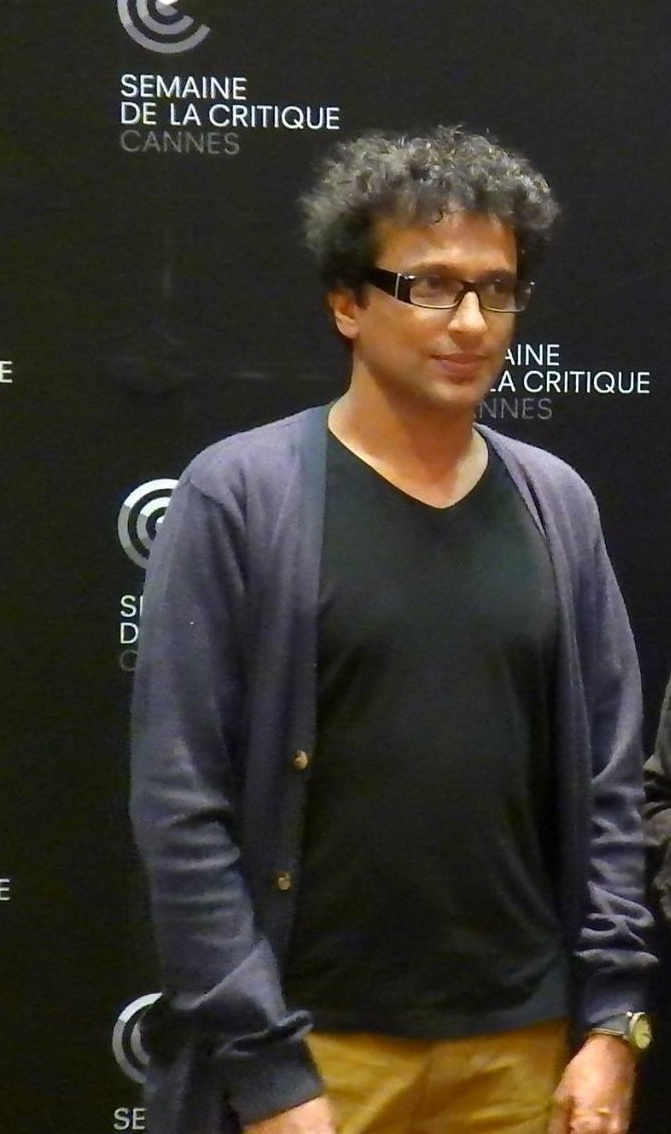
- Born: kannur, Kerala, India
- Occupation: Film sound design
- Years active: 1998–present
- Website: fireflyspostsound.com

PM Satheesh is an Indian film sound designer, sound editor and mixer. In 1999 he received the National award for best sound recording and design for his work on Kumar Talkies. He has worked in Hollywood, Hindi, Telugu, Tamil and Malayalam films.

== Biography ==
He was born in Kerala, India. He is a graduate of the Film and Television Institute of India or FTII, Pune, India. He has worked as sound recordist and sound designer on numerous documentaries for BBC, Channel 4, National Geographic, National Film Board of Canada and the CBC and feature films like 15 Park Avenue and Dreaming Lhasa, Mangal Pandey: The Rising and Fakir of Venice. For six years he held exclusive contract for MTV India for sound on live music events and broadcast. He is Chief sound designer and founder of Fireflys Post Sound P.M Satheesh has over two decades of experience in location sound and sound design. PM Satheesh established Scuba Location Sound, painstakingly putting together high end location sound equipment and a dozen freelance sound recordists working under his guidance. This set up allowed Scuba to record location sound for documentaries and television where there was hardly any time for post dubbing.Braving all logistical nightmares PM Satheesh used Pro Tools on location in the Himalayas for a multi track hard disk based recording for the Tibetan feature film Dreaming Lhasa.

P.M Satheesh is working for S.S Rajamouli’s Baahubali, scheduled to have been released in April 2015. Regarding his experience with the film, he said "Baahubali is one of the very few films in South where a lot of importance is being given to sound recording. We dropped the idea of shooting with sync sound since the dialogue delivery has to be modified accordingly. The sound design team embeds various types of micro-phones throughout the set to record the ambient sound, which will lend a natural feel to the film. It's necessary, because some of these sounds aren't available in the market. It's quite a challenge for everyone".

== Filmography ==
Year	Film
1999-	Kumar Talkies
2002	Agni Varsha
2005	Mangal Pandey: The Rising
2005	Dreaming Lhasa
2005	15 Park Avenue
2006	Mixed Doubles
2006	Printed Rainbows
2009	Kaminey
2009	Road
2009	Nero's Guest
2010	Ishqiya
2011	7 Khoon Maaf
2011	Anaganaga O Dheerudu
2012	The Reluctant Fundamentalist
2012	Talaash
2013	Matru Ki Bijlee Ka Mandola
2013	Faith Connections
2014	Darr @ The Mall
2014	Hawaa Hawaai
2014	Watchdogs
2014	True Love Story
2015	Baahubali
2015	Angry Indian Goddesses
2016	Pulimurugan
2017	Baahubali
2018	Kaalakaandi
