= Hamsa Naava =

- Cover of the song, featuring actor Prabhas and Anushka Shetty

Song by Deepu, Sony

from the album of Baahubali 2: The Conclusion
- Released: 26 March 2017
- Genre: Stage and screen
- Length: 3:27
- Label: Lahari Music
- Songwriter: Chaitanya Prasad

Music video
- "Hamsa Naava" on YouTube

"Hamsa Naava" (transl. Swan Boat) is a Telugu song from the 2017 film Baahubali 2: The Conclusion. Sung by Sony and Deepu, the song's lyrics were penned by Chaitanya Prasad and its music was composed by M.M. Keeravani. The music video of the track features Prabhas as Amarendra Baahubali and Anushka Shetty as Devasena in a romantic duet on a flying ship, with Devasena expressing her feelings for Amarendra Baahubali. The theme, title and idea of the song was given by the film's director S. S. Rajamouli.

== Release ==
The audio of the song was released on 26 March 2017 along with other tracks in the album through the YouTube channel of T-Series Telugu. The music video of the song released on 20 July 2017. The audio of the song has received more than 40 million views on YouTube.

The song was released in Tamil as Orey Oar Ooril on 9 April 2017, in Hindi as Veeron Ke Veer Aa on 5 April 2017 and in Malayalam as Ore Oru Raja on 24 April 2017.

== Reception ==
Firstpost writes, "An instantly catchy song, sung by Sony and Deepu, has lyrics written by Chaitanya Prasad. The musical arrangement throughout the song sounds perfect for a romantic duet in a period drama like Baahubali."

== Accolades ==
Year	Awards	Category	Recipient	Result
2018	65th Filmfare Awards South	Best Playback Singer Female – Telugu	Sony & Deepu	Nominated
2018	7th South Indian International Movie Awards	Best Female Playback Singer (Telugu)	Sony	Nominated
