= List of Baahubali characters =

Characters featured in the Baahubali film franchise

The Baahubali franchise includes two films, two television series, and a trilogy of novels. The following characters appear in Baahubali: The Beginning (2015), Baahubali 2: The Conclusion (2017), Baahubali: The Lost Legends (2017), Baahubali: Crown of Blood (2024), and the novels The Rise of Sivagami (2017), Chaturanga (2020), and Queen of Mahishmathi (2020).

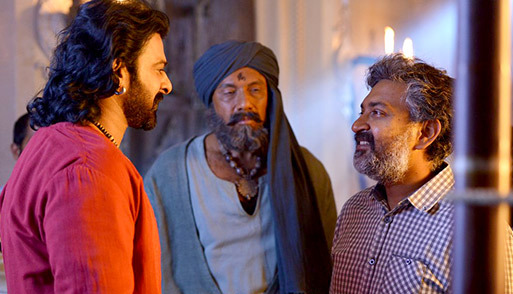
Prabhas as Amarendra Bahubali (left) and Sathyaraj as Kattappa (centre) with director S. S. Rajamouli

== Amarendra Baahubali ==
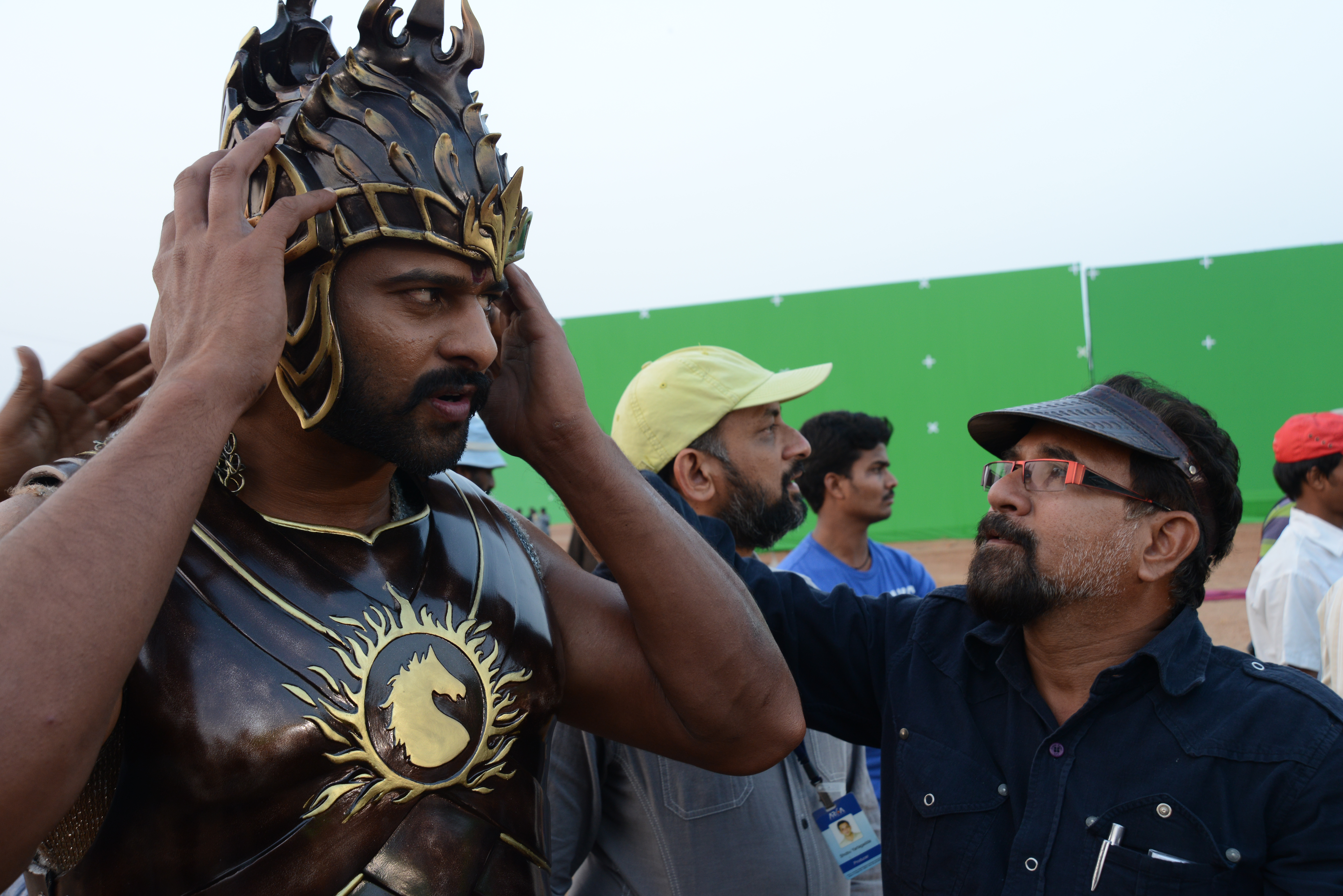
Amarendra Baahubali portrayed by Prabhas (left) with Sabu Cyril (right)

=== Fictional biography ===
Amarendra Baahubali, Maharaja "Vikramdeva" Mahadeva and Akhila's son, was born in Mahishmati (Telugu) / Magizhmathi (Tamil). His mother (then Queen Dowager) died while giving birth to him. He was named "Baahubali" by his aunt, Rajamatha Sivagami, who later became his foster mother. She recognized his leadership qualities and announced him as the next king after he succeeded in a contest to defend the empire from the Kalakeya invasion. Though Bhallaladeva killed the Kalakeya king Inkoshi, Baahubali was announced as the next king as he showed more honor in the battle. He is envied by Bhallaladeva who manipulates Sivagami and issues an order to Kattappa to execute Baahubali for treason. He is loyal and bound by his promise even at the cost of his throne. He is the father of Mahendra Baahubali alias Sivudu. He was married to Devasena.

He is a skilled warrior with both sword and arrows, specializing in fighting with the battleaxe. He can shoot 3 arrows in a single string. He has good battle strategy skills, which prove useful in the battle against the Pindari tribe.

=== Exile ===
Devasena, during her visit to a temple cuts Sethupathi's fingers off with a dagger when he dares to misbehave with visiting women and her. She is shackled and led into the court where an enraged Amarendra beheads Sethupathi for his misdeeds. The enraged Bhallaladeva makes Rajamatha sivagami banish Amarendra and devasena from the palace. Amarendra obeys his mother and They renounce their royal positions and go to live among the people of mahishmati. The people who love Amarendra Bahubali dearly welcomes them to live with them lovingly.

=== Death ===
As Amarendra's fame does not decrease, Bijjaladeva and Bhallaladeva stage a conspiracy to further turn Shivagami against Amarendra. Bijjaladeva convinces Kumara Varma that Amarendra, Devasena and their unborn baby's lives shall be threatened by Bhallaladeva's machinations, and manipulates him into entering the palace in stealth of night to assassinate Bhallaladeva. However, Kumara Varma and his companions are defeated and murdered. Kumara Varma learns that it is a conspiracy to have Shivagami pass an order to assassinate Amarendra. Shivagami, who believes that Kumara Varma had been sent by Amarendra to murder Bhallaladeva, passes an order to Kattappa to assassinate Amarendra secretly, as declaring it publicly would lead to an internal war.

Bound by oath to serve the kingdom, Kattappa helplessly lures Amarendra to a secluded place by feigning that he is in trouble, and there where Amarendra is backstabbed and killed. After his death, what happened to his body was not revealed.

== Mahendra Baahubali ==
Prabhas as Mahendra Baahubali/Shivudu

Mahendra Baahubali was born in Mahishmati on the day his father Amarendra Baahubali was assassinated by Kattappa, and his mother Devasena was held captive by Bhallaladeva. Sivagami later flees with him from the castle to save him from Bhallaladeva and gives up her life to save him. The child is found by Sanga and her husband who belong to a tribe that lives beyond the kingdom. The couple raises him as their own. Many years later, Mahendra climbs the waterfall and eventually enters Mahishmati. He rescues his mother Devasena and slays Bhallaladeva's son Bhadra. Mahendra Baahubali is the spitting image of Amarendra Baahubali.

Kattappa narrates the story of his heritage. Upon learning the truth, Mahendra rouses the people of Mahishmati to revolt against Bhallaladeva. In the ensuing battle, Bhallaladeva and Baahubali engage in a duel and Baahubali defeats Bhallaladeva. Baahubali's mother, Devasena, kills Bhallaladeva by immolating him alive. Baahubali later becomes the king of Mahishmati and marries Avantika. He has similar qualities to those of his father: he is creative, loyal, realistic, practical, wise, and valiant.

== Bhallaladeva ==
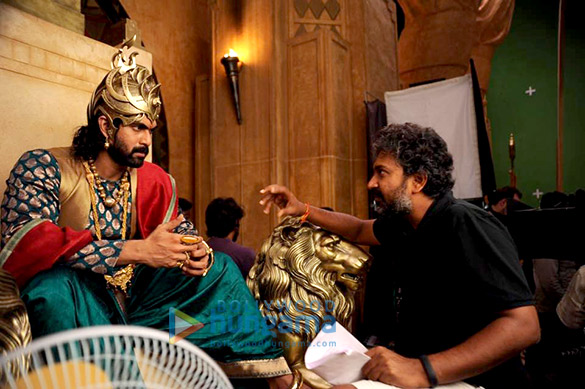
Rana Daggubati as Bhallaladeva with director Rajamouli

Bhallaladeva (Palvaalthevan in Tamil, Portrayed by Rana Daggubati) is the king of Mahishmati. He is a renowned fighter, Sivagami and Bijjaladeva's only child and the older cousin-brother of Amarendra Bahubali. He is envious of Amarendra Baahubali. When he is made King, he relieves Amarendra of his official duties and later convinces Sivagami that Amarendra is trying to assassinate him. Bhallaladeva takes Devasena as a prisoner and frequently taunts her in her captivity. Devasena later burns him alive on a funeral pyre she prepared for him after Mahendra Baahubali defeats him in a battle. In this way she reduces Bhallaladeva to ashes to repay for all the bad that he has done. After his death, his golden statue is disposed of by the order of king Mahendra Baahubali.

== Devasena ==
Anushka Shetty as Devsena

Devasena (Portrayed by Anushka Shetty) is the lead female character of the Baahubali franchise along with Sivagami. Princess of Kuntala Kingdom, Devasena is a skilled fighter and a great archer. Amarendra Baahubali falls in love with her during a visit to Kuntala kingdom. Devasena reciprocates in her feelings toward him. She is brave and bold and believes firmly in her decisions, and it is through great practice that she achieves her martial skills. Devasena marries Baahubali. Bhallaladeva wants Devasena's hand in marriage and makes his mother Sivagami promise that he would marry Devasena. Devasena (now in love with Baahubali) rejects the marriage proposal by Bhallaladeva and chooses Baahubali instead. Furious, Sivagami declares Bhallaladeva the new king of Mahishmati.

Baahubali eventually dies at the hands of Kattappa, his trusted companion. On the day Baahubali dies, Devasena gives birth to Mahendra Baahubali. Sivagami eventually learns the truth about Bhallaladeva's treachery. Bhallaladeva orders his men to capture Devasena while Sivagami flees with baby Mahendra in her arms.

Devasena is then held captive and tormented for the next 25 years. During her time in captivity, she prepares a funeral pyre for Bhalla. She promises that she will reduce Bhalla to ashes by burning him alive on the funeral pyre she has prepared. She would eventually be freed by her son Mahendra Baahubali (now called Sivudu/Shiva). Her son, Sivudu, after learning about his father's heritage and demise, sets out to avenge his death.

After Mahendra defeats Bhalla in the battle, Devasena reduces Bhalla to ashes by burning him alive to death on the funeral pyre. In this way she takes her revenge. After Bhalla's death, Devasena becomes the new Queen Mother (Rajamatha) and announces Mahendra Baahubali as the new king of Mahishmati kingdom.

== Sivagami Devi ==
Ramya Krishnan as Sivagami Devi

Rajamatha (Queen Mother) Sivagami Devi (Portrayed by Ramya Krishnan) is the former regent of the Mahishmati kingdom. She is a skilled fighter, feared by her enemies and seen to have thwarted enemies' plots to overthrow the kingdom. She is a true leader who treats everyone equally, including her son and nephew. She is a strong headed leader and the most powerful character in the Baahubali series, who decides the fate of Mahishmati. The first movie of the series portrays her as judicious in her decisions. The second movie of the series shows her grey side. She has her own imperfections: pride, temper and inflexibility, all of which lead her to persecute Amarendra Baahubali for marrying Devasena.

Her father was ordered to be executed for treason by Maharaja Somadeva, Bijjaladeva's father and she was raised by her foster father Thimma. Sivagami became the foster mother of Amarendra Baahubali whose mother, her foster sister Akhila, died after giving birth to him. She assumes the guardian role of the throne until the princes are ready to rule the kingdom. Sivagami raises both her nephew Amarendra Baahubali and her son Bhallaladeva to be worthy heirs to the throne and when the time comes she decides to make one of them a king of Mahishmati. After a war with the Kalakeyas, Sivagami proclaims Baahubali as the new king of Mahishmati. She is manipulated by her husband Bijjaladeva and son Bhallaladeva into ordering Kattappa to kill Amarendra Baahubali, her nephew. Realising her mistake, she sacrifices her life in the attempt to save Mahendra Baahubali, the son of Amarendra Baahubali, from Bhallaladeva's treachery.

== Kattappa ==
Sathyaraj as Kattappa

Karikala Kattappa aka Kattappa is the Commander of the King's royal bodyguard and Capital guards. Though he is a very skilled warrior for the Crown of Mahishmati, Kattapa's forefathers, beginning with Ugrappa, pledged their allegiance and loyalty to the rulers of Mahishmati for their assistance in avenging against Vaithalikas. He was appointed as the royal bodyguard of Bijjaladeva by the incumbent king, Somadeva, after he saved the lives of Bijjaladeva and Mahadeva (who later got the title of Vikramadeva). He was ordered by Sivagami and Bhallaladeva (then rulers) to kill Baahubali. He kills Amarendra Baahubali under order of the royals, later realizing that he was fooled. Though Kattappa is a servant of the royal family, he is addressed as "Mama" (maternal uncle) by Amarendra Baahubali & revered as a father figure by Devasena, so he is addressed as "Thatha" (grandfather) by Mahendra Baahubali. After Amarendra's death, he wanted to free Devasena from the clutches of Bhallaladeva, which she refused. On meeting Shivudu, he revolted against the rule of Bhallaladeva under the former's leadership.

== Avanthika ==
Tammannah as Avantika

Avanthika (Portrayed by Tamannaah) is a skilled warrior and a fighter of the rebel group. Mahendra Baahubali falls in love with her and she later accepts him after she discovers that he climbed the waterfall mountain just for her. As a guerrilla fighter, her life is devoted to a sole mission, saving Devasena from captivity in Mahishmati by Bhallaladeva.

She is rebellious, a fierce warrior who fights for what is just. Like the other female leads of the series, she is strong and independent in her decisions and opinions. She fights alongside Mahendra Baahubali during the Mahishmati revolt and protects Devasena during the trial by fire ritual at the end of the sequel, Baahubali 2: The Conclusion.

== Bijjaladeva ==
Nassar as Bijjaladeva

Bijjaladeva (Pingalathevan in Tamil) (Portrayed by Nassar) is the husband of Sivagami and father of Bhallaladeva, and former prince of Mahishmati during the reign of his father, Somadeva. He has many bad habits, such as drinking, those being the reasons that he was replaced by his younger brother as the king of Mahishmati. Thus, he grew up resenting his brother and his family, and when Amarendra Baahubali was born, he hated him as well. After Sivagami announced Amarendra as the king, it only fed his jealousy. He may be considered the main antagonist alongside Bhallaladeva, as he is always generating hatred of Baahubali and Devasena in Bhallaladeva's mind.

== Other characters ==
=== Kumara Varma ===
Kumara Varma is the brother of King Jayavarma's unnamed wife and was considered as a potential groom of Devasena. He lived with Devasena's family and lacked self-confidence until he meets Amarendra Baahubali, who boosts his confidence during the Pindaris' attack on the Kunthala Kingdom. He also had feelings for Devasena. He is assassinated by Bijjaladeva after having been tricked into an attempted assassination of Bhallaladeva as part of their plan to discredit Baahubali.

=== Supporting characters ===
1. Bhadrudu/Bhadra - Bhadrudu is the son of Bhallaladeva. He is a haughty, ill-behaved man who is especially rude towards Devasena. It has not been revealed who his mother is/was. He is killed by Sivudu while the latter was rescuing Devasena from Bhallaladeva as punishment for assaulting and insulting Devasena. Director Rajamouli later revealed that Bhadrudu was adopted by Bhallaladeva to be his heir.
2. Inkoshi - Inkoshi is the king of Kalakeyas, a tribe residing in a kingdom south of Mahishmati. He is killed by Bhallaladeva in the war. This character was featured in the first film 'The Beginning'. However, his name was only revealed in Baahubali: The Lost Legends (2017).
3. Jayavarma - King Jayavarma is the king of Kunthala Kingdom and brother of Princess Devasena. After his entire Kingdom is destroyed by Bhallaladeva, Jaya Varma forms a rebellious group, to free Devasena, of which Shivudu's wife Avantika was a member. He is later killed by Bhallaladeva in the war.
4. Marthanda - At the time of Amarendra Bahubali's birth, Marthanda colluded with few other ministers and conspired to take over the crown. Sivagami uncovered the plot and killed him, before taking control of the throne.
5. Sethupathi - Bhallaladeva's loyal friend, who is later made chief lieutenant of Mahishmati by him. During Devasena's visit to the temple, he gropes several common women. Disgusted by this, Devasena cuts his fingers when he is about to grope her. When Devasena stood for trial before King Bhallaladeva for cutting off his fingers, Baahubali says, "If a man touches a woman without her permission, not his fingers, but his head, should be cut off!" and thus beheads him, showing his way of dispensing justice.
6. Sanga - A tribal woman who adopts Mahendra Baahubali after the villagers spot him in the river held by Sivagami. She is the alpha female, being the wife of the chieftain and holds a powerful position in her tribe.
7. Sakethudu/Sahithan - Sakethudu is a traitor, who sells Mahishmati's war secrets to the ruthless Kalakeyas. He fled to Singapuram, but was subsequently captured by Baahubali and Bhallaladeva.
8. Sheikh Aslam Khan - He is a Muslim sword-merchant from Kabul, who befriends Kattappa during the weapons trade. The character appears in the first film.
9. Vaishali - Avantika's friend and a member of the rebel group formed by now-ousted Kunthala king, Jaya Varma to rescue Devasena.
10. "Vikramadeva" Mahadeva - Amarendra's father and the former king of Mahishmathi. The character appears in the first film in a portrait.

== Baahubali: Lost Legends characters ==
The following characters are introduced in the TV series Baahubali: The Lost Legends (2017–2020).

1. Pradhan Guru - He is a royal teacher employed by Sivagami to train the princes in the art of combat and leadership, however his plans to destroy Mahishmati are later exposed. He's driven from the kingdom and killed by Kattappa.
2. Vaara - The prince of a neighbouring kingdom that tries to form an alliance with Mahishmati. No different than Bhalla, Vaara too disrespects his subjects and cares only about the power he'll possess from taking the throne after his father. He opposes the treaty with Mahishmati against the barbarian threat and suggests that Sivagami is only trying to get rich off of their trading routes. After his sister Yamagni accidentally kills their father, he takes the crown and becomes king.
3. Yamagni - Vaara's sister, whom she heavily despises for his lack of compassion. She disguises herself as a samurai and attempts to kill him, but her plan is found out by her new friend Amarendra Baahubali. She and Baahubali have feelings for each other shortly after they meet. When Baahubali finds out that she's been attacking her brother, he attempts to talk her out of it, unsure if she's right about the monstrous king Vaara would become. She tries to poison him, but the cup is given to her father who ends up dead from drinking it. Vaara believes their server attempted assassination and executes him as his first act as king. She and Bahubali later choose separate paths for the welfare of their lives and kingdoms.
4. Ravi - A friend and guard of Mahishmati. He joins Amardendra on his quest to confront the beast that has been ravaging the trading routes of Mahishmati. Ravi is easily frightened and considered a coward by his friends, but Amarendra shows him sympathy and lets him join for the quest. For reasons unknown, Ravi is revealed to be a traitorous rogue who tries to kill Baahubali, wielding a hook and chain with a sedative poison on it. The beast, which turns out to be a tiger, saves Baahubali and kills Ravi after Baahubali saved her cubs. Amardendra tries to explain Ravi's treachery to Bhalla who unfortunately slew the mother tiger. Bhalla denies this believing Amarendra was delusional.
5. Avinash - A close friend of Bhallaladeva who was usually against Baahubali's popularity. In the first episode, Avinash helps defend the attacked village from bandits but retreats with Bhalla when they fail. At the end of the episode, Bhalla shows him to where the royal family conducts a sacred ritual and how his father Bijaladeva was never allowed to participate since he was denied being king. When Avinash suggests it's because of his father's disability, Bhalla drowns his friend in cold blood, not without telling him how much he hates his brother and how much he craves to rule the kingdom with an iron fist the way his father could not. Days later, Avinash's parents are worried of his disappearance and Bhalla lies to them that Avinash feared his duties of being a warrior and ran away to find his own path, leaving his distraught parents ashamed. Bhalla claims that he didn't tell anyone and would not be a true friend if Avinash was dishonored, and slyly smiles when the rest of his friends leave.
6. Dharmraj - An imposter who claims to be the son of a false king Jayadeva, whom he alleges to be the elder brother of Bijjaladeva's father Somadeva. He proclaims the throne as his, and the royal family agrees to it, as part of their plan, in which they later expose Dharmraj as an imposter.
7. Aakaanksh - A close friend of both, Bahubali and Bhalladeva. He is seen as a refugee member of Prayagirajyam.
8. Kaalakhanjar - A kind-hearted sea pirate who owned an island, and even though thought to be the cruellest of men, was very kind and always used to let people live freely on his island. His daughter, Ayesha, became the next Kaalakhanjar after him.
9. Zoraver - He is the king of Barigaza, previously a slave who was separated from his wife and son. Zoraver once defeated Bahubali in close combat; however getting impressed by him, he became an ally of Mahishmati.
10. Sujata - The princess of Jwalarajyam and a close ally of Mahishmati.
11. Ayesha - Kallakhanjar's daughter and successor, who is a former enemy turned ally to Baahubali.
12. Zoraver - a former slave turned king of Barigaza. He is a good friend of Baahubali and has helped him liberate the kingdom from Dharmaraj. He has a wife Ranatadevi and a son Karan Singh.
13. Kalpana Devi - a malicious warlord and evil queen of Agrata kingdom, whose husband Shrutsen was murdered by allies of Bijaladeva. She leads an army of women knights and warriors and has ravaged many kingdoms and tribes.
14. Paramhans - a king and ally of Mahishmati, however attempts revenge on Baahubali after his son is killed by him. His kingdom is destroyed by Kalpana.
15. Torra - a warrior king who is in battle against his enemy Ukami for rule over the kingdom of Nippon.
16. Jagath - Aakaanksh's father and the leader of the Prayagi refugees.
17. Mohini - Vaarah's secret villager wife, whose identity he keeps hidden from her and hers from the world.
18. Harsha - Vaarah and Mohini's young son.
19. Strukaal Worshiper Chief - leader of the tribe that protects the Strukaal urn.
20. Chandalini - one of Kattappa's teachers, she has a menacing appearance and is blind but strict, headstrong and unstoppable in a dark environment. She is a guardian of a cave in Nindicaru cliffs which houses poisonous mushrooms that she guards from the world. She is killed saving Baahubali from a poison attack to warn him about Pradhan's identity.

== The Rise of Sivagami characters ==
The following characters are introduced in the book The Rise of Sivagami (2017).

=== Protagonists ===
==== Sivagami ====
The daughter of Devaraya who seeks revenge for the injustice meted out to her parents (and later foster parents, Thimma and Bhama, mentor, Skandadasa, and many other innocents).

==== Devaraya ====
He was a bhoomipathi (Note: Bhoomipathi is a title that indicates high status in the kingdom of Mahishmathi.) and was Sivagami's father, later branded as a traitor. His wife, Kadambari, was executed on the same day as him. He was friends with Thimma, Parameshwara, Hiranya and King Somadeva.

=== Antagonists ===
==== Pattaraya ====
He is a bhoomipathi and is known to be cunning and ruthless. Although he is a bhoomipathi, he rose up in society from poverty through his wit and dedication. Pattaraya is a family man and shows great affection toward Mekhala, his daughter.

==== Jeemotha ====
A pirate who is an expert sailor. He has a charm that has a strong effect on woman. He uses his wit to escape tricky situations, but doesn't abstain from violence if it is needed.

==== Keki ====
She is a eunuch and an assistant of Devadasi Kalika. She is a pimp and finds women for Kalika's trade. She resides in Pattaraya's camp.

=== Other main characters ===
==== Shivappa ====
He is the younger brother of Kattappa who regrets his life as a slave and wants to gain freedom. He loves his elder brother, but he gets into fights with him often. His dream is to join the Vaithalikas, a rebel forest tribe fighting against Mahishmathi. He loves Kamakshi, who is Sivagami's friend.

==== "Vikramadeva" Mahadeva ====
Mahadeva (titled Vikramadeva) is Bijjaladeva's younger brother, who is a poet and a romanticist. He knows that he is not a great warrior and looks up to his father. He becomes weak with his arrogant mother. Although he loves his brother, he is scared of him. He was in love with Sivagami. Later, Sivagami marries his elder brother and he marries Akhila with whom he fathered a son named Amarendra Baahubali who later became the greatest warrior known to be in Mahishmathi.

==== Skandadasa ====
He is the deputy prime minister (Upapradhana) of Mahismathi. Skandadasa is a man of principles who belongs to the untouchables caste, unlike other high caste nobles in the court. He is admired by the common people, but the nobles dislike him.

=== Other characters ===
1. Ally - She was brought up by the evasive rebel queen Achi Nagamma and is an elite warrior and spy in a women's rebel army. She uses her sexuality and seduction powers to finish her work.
2. Devadasi Kalkika - She is the head of Pushyachakra Inn, notoriously known as Kalika's Den. She is a seductress and is successful in seducing the Mahishmathi nobles.
3. Kamakshi - She is Sivagami's close friend who lives in the orphanage. Her only goal in life is to live in peace with her lover Shivappa, far from the kingdom of Mahishmathi.
4. Mahapradhana Parameswara - He is the prime minister of Mahismathi. He is the king's guru and Skandadasa's mentor. He is a kind-hearted and refined politician.
5. Maharaja Somadeva - The king of Mahishmathi. He is a deeply respected figure who is feared by his subjects.
6. Maharani Hemavati - The queen of Mahishmathi. She is a haughty and proud person.
7. Malayappa - Maharaja Somadeva's personal slave. He is Kattappa and Shivappa's father. He is proud and dedicated to his duty.
8. Thimma - Sivagami's foster father, who used to be a great friend of Sivagami's biological father, Devaraya, before he was executed. He is a bhoomipathi, but he is kind and a caring father.
9. Simuka - Ambitious trader and fixer. Simuka is from a neighbouring city. He gets embroiled into the politics of Mahismati due to his ambition. Extremely cunning and a survivor.

== Politics ==
Within the Baahubali world there are numerous inhabitants in the form of kingdoms and tribes.

=== Mahishmati ===
The new ruler is Mahendra Bahubali, after defeating Bhallaladeva. Mahishmati kingdom is the epicenter around which the story of Baahubali revolves. It is a vast kingdom, composed of smaller kingdoms and other tribes. River Jeeva Nadhi runs along the entire course of the kingdom. Shiva is the family deity of the royal family & their war-cry is Jay Mahishmati (Hail Mahishmati) but later became Amarendra Baahubali, Vijaya Bhava (Victory to Amarendra Baahubali) in Amarendra's legacy. The royal family runs as shown below.

King Somadeva
Sivagami Devi	Bijjaladeva	King Vikramadeva	Akhila
Bhallaladeva	Amarendra Baahubali	Devasena
Bhadrudu (adopted)	Mahendra Baahubali	Avantika

=== Kuntala ===
Kuntala Kingdom lies to the north of Mahishmati Kingdom, down the line of Jeevanadhi. It is a smaller kingdom annexed to the rule of Mahishmati. King Jaya Varma rules this kingdom. Devasena hails from this kingdom, as she is the sister of King Jaya Varma. The flag of Kunthala kingdom bears the symbol of swan. Krishna is the family deity of the royal family & their war-cry is Jai Bhavani (Hail Bhavani).

Kuntala kingdom is shown in the second film. It has a beautiful palace where the royal family resides. Bull is a sacred animal in this kingdom and there are various sports involved with the bull. In this region, a man is considered to be brave, if he can tame the bull. It also boasts of a dam on the river of JeevaNadhi to harness it for various purposes. Agriculture is the main occupation of Kuntala kingdom. That's why the dam was built.

=== Kalakeya tribe ===
The Kalakeyas are a ferocious warrior tribe, who were undefeated. They are uncivilised savages. They speak a language named Kiliki, an intuitive language developed solely for the purpose of this franchise. They have an army of 100,000 warriors. These warriors, when they defeat a kingdom, cause extensive damage to the region. In addition to pillaging the wealth of the region, they kill the people, including the children.

Inkoshi is the head of this Kalakeya tribe. The tribe is defeated when they declare a war against Mahishmati kingdom and the hostages were freed.

=== Amburi tribe ===
The villagers of Amburi reside along the lower course of River Jeeva Nadhi. They have no knowledge of Mahismati Kingdom or what lies in the upper course of the river, as a waterfall separates them. This tribe worships the deity of Lord Shiva.

When Sivagami escapes from Mahishmati through a secret cave, she reaches this place before she dies. As there had been assassins following Sivagami, the villagers close the secret cave, fearing for the safety of the baby. The chiefwoman of the tribe, named Sanga from this tribe adopts Baahubali as an infant and raises him as 'Shivudu'.

=== Pindaris ===
Pindaris are dacoit-like army who survive by plundering the nearby villages. After ransacking the villages they kill the people of the village. They hunt in and around the region of the Kuntala Kingdom.

A small group of Pindaris was killed during Devasena's visit to a nearby village. As a result of which, the Pindaris army attack the Kuntala kingdom, which is thwarted by Kuntala army with the help of Amarendra Baahubali and Kattappa.

=== Vaithalikas ===
A rebel tribe of Gauriparvat ancestry that was conquered by Mahishmati. The head of the tribe is Bhutaraya and they wish to take their land back.

=== Rudragni ===
A neighbouring kingdom to Mahishmati introduced in the TV series, led by king Yaduvanshi and his children Vaara and Yamagni. Vaara is similarly greedy and corrupt like Bhallaladeva, leading to his sister trying to kill him on several occasions, unintentionally poisoning their father while visiting Mahishmati. Vaarah takes the crown to the kingdom before he is eventually killed by Yamagni who rules as queen.

=== Barbarians ===
An extensive group of raiders and troublesome warriors seen in the TV series, donning demon and animal masks and plunder villages. They are led by Pradhan Guru and Barbaric Hulk.

=== Jwalarajyam ===
A pacafistic kingdom known for housing a library and being home to all known knowledge. The kingdom is found within the crater of a volcano and princess Sujata is a member of it. Sujata forms an alliance with Amarendra Baahubali after he helps save the library from the Barbarians.

=== Empire of Barigaza ===
A land ruled over by king Zoraver consisting of kingdoms practicing slavery and trafficking. They were liberated under his rule.

=== Agrata ===
An imperialistic kingdom ruled over by the evil queen Kalpana Devi, who has ravaged many other tribes and kingdoms including the Kalakeyas, Amaram, and Barigaza. Kalpana's husband Shrutsen was murdered by ministers allied with Mahishmati so she prides herself on taking it as the ultimate prize.

=== Nippon ===
The ancient name of Japan, in competition for rule between the warlords Torra and Ukami. After the two die, the Tengu clan led by Shinji take control.

=== Amaram ===
A kingdom ruled over by king Paramhans and his warriors, the Obsidian Blades. They become enemies of Mahishmati and later wiped out by Kalpana.

=== Pirates ===
A tribe of pirates that have threatened Mahishmati's naval fleet and was confronted by the princes. They are led by Captain Khaalakhanjar and his daughter Ayesha, and are revealed to be against monarchy and have started their own civilization running off of theft. After Khaalakhanjar is killed, Ayesha blames Baahubali and swears to kill him, but reforms and becomes an ally.

=== Kuntala Rebel Tribe ===
Band of rogue warriors engaged in guerilla warfare against Bhalladeva. They consist of trained warriors from Kuntala, villagers, farmers, and other combatants. They are led by Jaya Varma and dwell in a cave hideout in a forest next to the Amburi tribe, atop a mountain. They ally with Mahendra to take Mahishmati back.

=== Prayagirajyam ===
A kingdom mentioned in the TV series, a failed and underdeveloped one with people who had high honor and nobility standards. The Prayagis were once at war with Mahishmati, and after it was taken over the citizens are now outside refugees. The leader of the Prayagi refuges was Jagath, and the role is taken by his son Aakanksh.

=== Strukaal ===
A long lost civilization known for its king Durkaal, who defeated a demoness who was terrorizing the village by sealing her in an urn using a strand of his hair.

=== Strukaal Worshiping Tribe ===
A tribe of savage-like folk who intend to guard the magical urn left by the Strukaals. They can behave violently and are misunderstood by the public, and are not used to the existence of large city networks.

=== Wandering Tribe ===
A tribe of nomadic explorers and combatants led by Mahabali, a friend of Kattappa. The tribe members appear to have makeup giving them blue skin and ornaments that resemble Hindu deities.

=== Splinter Wandering Tribe ===
A tribe that defected from the Wondering Tribe and practices a similar culture.

=== Forest Tribe ===
A tribe of proclaimed forest guardians who oppose outsider hunting, they wear animal skin and worship the mythical warthog Old Father.

=== Foreign Kingdoms ===
Characters are seen hailing from foreign lands including China, Scandinavia, Japan, Mongolia, Ireland, and Arabia.

== Family Tree ==
A detailed family tree of the Royal Families of Mahishmati, Kuntala, Vaithalika, Kadarimandalam and Rudragni.
