= Bhallaladeva =

Fictional character

- Baahubali character
- Rana Daggubati as Bhallaladeva
- First appearance: Baahubali: The Beginning (2015)
- Last appearance: Baahubali 2: The Conclusion (2017)
- Created by: V. Vijayendra Prasad; S. S. Rajamouli
- Portrayed by: Rana Daggubati

In-universe information
- Gender: Male
- Occupation: Former King of Mahishmati
- Family: Bijjaladeva (father); Sivagami Devi (mother); Bhadrudu (adoptive son); Amarendra Baahubali (cousin brother); Mahendra Baahubali (nephew)
- Children: Bhadrudu (adoptive son)

Bhallaladeva is a fictional character and recurring antagonist of the Baahubali franchise, and the main antagonist of the movie series. The character was created by V. Vijayendra Prasad and S. S. Rajamouli and was portrayed by Rana Daggubati in the films Baahubali: The Beginning and Baahubali: The Conclusion, which were directed by Rajamouli. The director of the Baahubali franchise, S. S. Rajamouli, openly confessed to the public in the Audio Launch event that he considers Bhallaladeva to be even more powerful compared to the main protagonists of the Baahubali franchise, Amarendra Baahubali and Mahendra Baahubali.

== Fictional biography ==
=== Early life ===
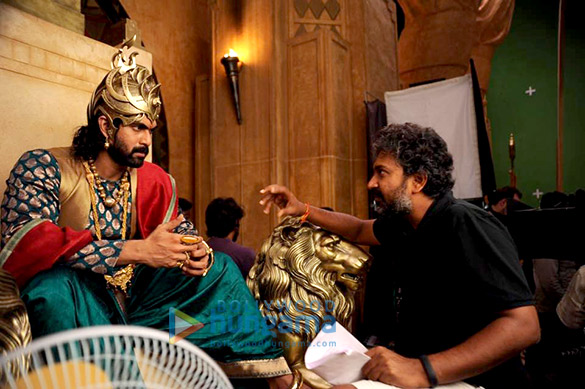
Daggubati as Bhallaldeva with director Rajamouli

Bhallaladeva is the son of Bijjaladeva and Rajamatha Sivagami Devi. He is raised by Sivagami along with his cousin Amarendra Baahubali, who is also his adoptive brother. He is a great warrior and is as equally skilled as his adoptive brother, though the director of the Baahubali franchise, S. S. Rajamouli, later openly confessed to the public in the Audio Launch event that he considers Bhallaladeva to be even more powerful compared to the main protagonists of the Baahubali franchise, Amarendra Baahubali and Mahendra Baahubali. However, he is not empathetic towards his subjects like Amarendra and has a ruthless personality. He is a traitorous prince and jealous of his adoptive brother's popularity. He is often misguided by his father Bijjaladeva to take evil steps.

=== Rivalry with Amarendra ===
Bhallaladeva shared a long rivalry with his adoptive brother Amarendra Baahubali, whom he was heavily jealous of him. Since in his mind, being powerful and overruling his subjects was his only priority while Baahubali sought equality and harmony among all of the kingdom's citizenship. Left out of the people and his mother's attention, he framed Baahubali for his assassination after he becomes king and later forced Kattappa to kill him.

=== Reign as King ===
Bhallaladeva manipulated his mother into hating Baahubali, who renounced the throne to stay married to Devasena. Bhallaladeva is crowned king by his mother. After he tricks his mother into ordering Baahubali's execution, he rules with an iron fist and oppresses his subjects as well as the entire region for 25 years. He destroys Kuntala completely, leading to the creation of the rebel alliance that intended to bring him down. After torturing Devasena for 25 years, his nephew Mahendra rescues her and ends his rule. Bhallaladeva is thrown onto the funeral pyre that Devasena prepared to burn him alive to death on, by Baahubali who used the same chains that Bhallaladeva used to chain Devasena. Devasena then lights the funeral pyre with him alive on it. The fire engulfs his entire body, and he burns alive to death. He screams with pain and dies his horrific but deserved death by burning to ashes.

== Reception ==
Bhallaladeva was a great warrior and had a strong desire for power. He was always ready to kill to ascend the throne of Mahishmati and lacked compassion, a trait which Amarendra Baahubali had in abundance. While the character of Bhallaladeva seemed to have the potential to be a good king, in the sequel, his desire for power makes him evil and he begins to do hideous things to accomplish his goal which makes him lose his sanity eventually and he transforms into a hateful character. Despite being the king, he feels like he has nothing. Baahubali was a good man and he died as one, while Bhallaladeva did not have the virtue of greatness from the beginning. His actions were guided by basic human emotions such as jealousy, envy, desire and loneliness. The Indian Express considers him as the most interesting character of the film even more than Baahubali and Devasena, and calls him "the only character that achieves such a huge transformation through the course of the film". Arkadev Ghoshal of IB Times considers him to be a sadist. Bollywood Life considered him to be the smartest character of Baahubali: The Conclusion. SS Rajamouli revealed that Bhallaladeva's son Bhadrudu was adopted, while Rana Daggubati jokingly said that he is a surrogate child. Another reviewer credited the female characters over Bhallaladeva.

== Development ==
=== Characterization ===
The character of Bhallaladeva is inspired from Ravana of Ramayana and Duryodhana of Mahabharata. Just like Ravana kidnapped Sita, he also captured Devasena and kept her for 25 years. Bhallaladeva's feeling of having his right denied before birth and his father is denied the right to the throne due to his disability is contrasted with the denial of the throne to Duryodhana's father Dhritarashtra due to his blindness and his feelings about the matter.

== Notable works done by Bhallaladeva ==
- Bhallaladeva killed his enemy king Inkoshi of the Kalakeyas; tried to kill Mahendra Baahubali; imprisoned Devasena for 25 years and was involved in the murder of Amarendra Baahubali and Sivagami.
- In the battle against Kalkeyas, he killed thousands of soldiers, the main war elephant with a single shot on its armored forehead (on which the king Inkoshi of Kalakeyas battles), the king Inkoshi of Kalakeyas (already wounded by Amarendra Baahubali), and even some of his kingdom's own innocent subjects imprisoned by Kalkeyas.
- Defeats and kills a raging and charging giant muscular Indian gaur with bare hands.
- He catches a fast-moving arrow shot at him from behind by Mahendra Baahubali, using his right hand.
- He had tried to kill Baahubali many times even before the Kalkeya War and risking his kingdom by it as well.
- He destroyed the whole Kuntaladesha only due to his anger on Devasena.
- A 90-metre-tall (300 ft) gold statue of Bhallaladeva was built after completion of his 25 years as the king which was later destroyed during his battle with Mahendra Bahubali. Later its broken head was dumped in the river.
- He used a scythed chariot drawn by a pair of horses in the Kalakeya War. It was destroyed by the Kalakeya chief. In his battle with Mahendra Baahubali he had a much more powerful chariot drawn by two Gaur bisons with three spinning scythes and a mechanism to shoot multiple arrows simultaneously at small intervals. It was destroyed by Mahendra.
- He carries a unique mace (Gada) whose head could be detached to be elongated through a chain inside it and looks same as that of Ball and chain. Mahendra smashed it while fighting him.

== Transformation ==
Rana Daggubati was inspired by Daniel Day-Lewis to play the character of Bhallaladeva. He had a lot of workout sessions for transforming into the character. Reports say that he worked for more than two hours a day for weight training and cardio. The older Bhallaldeva is heavier and weighed around 110 kg for those portions of both the films while his younger version is 8 kg lighter. He learned martial arts for the film. He ate every two and half hours as a part of his diet and avoided oil, while eating food rich in carbohydrates and proteins. Even Prabhas had to eat about 40 boiled eggs daily to increase his weight to 150 kg. They both went through very tough workouts including 500 push ups a day.

== Legacy and impact ==
Rana Daggubati, the actor who played Bhallaladeva, was paid a high amount for his role parallel to that of Baahubali, which was played by Prabhas, but he charged Rs 15 crore, less than the Rs 25 crore paid to Prabhas for the franchise. He described Baahubali as "career-defining" for him as the film industry will trust and support his vision. He further said that the film's success allowed him to gain more opportunities. He said he learned a lot working with the team of Baahubali. Owing to the similarities between the Hulk and the character Bhallaladeva, Rana Daggubati is also called the Tollywood Hulk.
