= Prabhas filmography =

List of performances by the Indian actor Prabhas

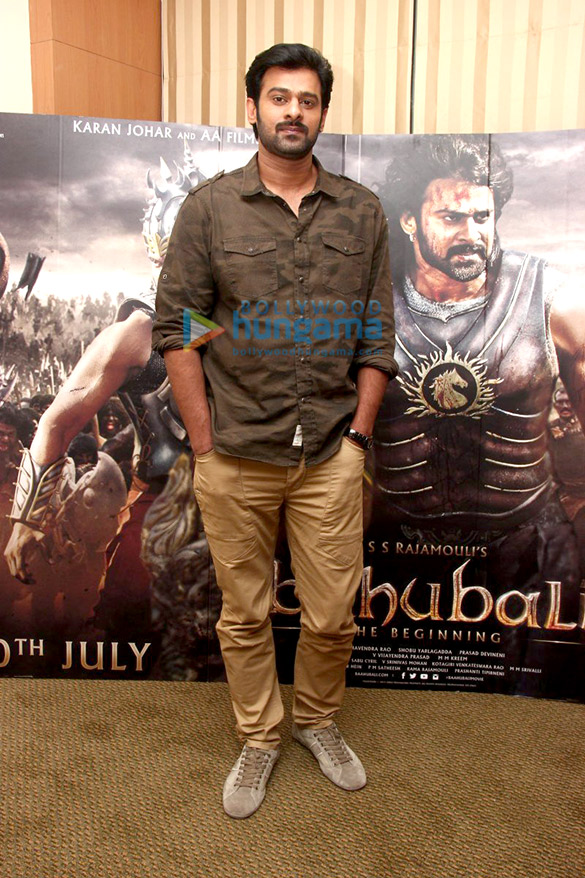
- Prabhas promoting Baahubali in 2015
- Film: 30

Prabhas is an Indian actor who works primarily in Telugu cinema. He made his acting debut in the 2002 Telugu film Eeswar. His first commercially successful film was the 2004 romantic action drama Varsham, which earned him a nomination for the Filmfare Award for Best Actor – Telugu. He followed this with Adavi Ramudu (2004) and S. S. Rajamouli's 2005 action film Chatrapathi; the latter was a major commercial success and earned Prabhas a second Filmfare nomination for Best Actor – Telugu.

The period following Chatrapathi was marked by films with mixed box-office results, such as Pournami (2006), Yogi (2007), Munna (2007), Bujjigadu (2008), Billa (2009) and Ek Niranjan (2009) did not meet commercial expectations. His next commercially successful were Darling (2010) and Mr. Perfect (2011). For his performance in Mirchi (2013), Prabhas won the Nandi Award for Best Actor.

Prabhas reunited with S. S. Rajamouli for the two-part epic action film Baahubali. He played the dual title role in Baahubali: The Beginning (2015) and Baahubali 2: The Conclusion (2017). The films, produced bilingually in Telugu and Tamil and dubbed in multiple languages, expanded his profile nationally. Both films were critical and commercial success. Baahubali 2 became the highest-grossing Indian film of all time. This duology elevated him from a star in Telugu cinema to a nationally and internationally recognized figure, with media outlets, critics, and popular culture widely designating him as "India's first pan-India star". Prabhas won the SIIMA Award for Best Actor – Telugu for his performance. The unprecedented financial success of the Baahubali series created immense audience expectations and commercial pressure for Prabhas's subsequent projects. After Baahubali duology, Prabhas began starring in high-budget productions filmed simultaneously in Telugu and Hindi, intended for a pan-Indian release. The first, the 2019 action-thriller Saaho, had a strong box-office opening but received generally unfavourable reviews from the critics. Hindi-dubbed version was commercially successful, while the original Telugu version underperformed. His next romantic-drama Radhe Shyam (2022) and Adipurush (2023) were critical and commercial failure.

Prabhas returned to commercial success with the 2023 action-drama film Salaar: Part 1 – Ceasefire, directed by Prashanth Neel. This film marked a strategic return to the high-octane, mass-action genre, it received mix to positive reviews from critics.. In 2024, he starred in the science-fiction film Kalki 2898 AD, a science-fiction epic, directed by Nag Ashwin. The film's narrative blended Indian mythology, specifically elements of the Mahabharata and the Kalki avatar, with a dystopian, post-apocalyptic setting. With a budget of ₹600 crore, it was reported to be the most expensive Indian film ever made. The film received generally positive reviews from critics and audience alike. The Guardian praised its "maximalism" and "brassy looking" world-building. Critics lauded the film's ambition, visual effects, and the performances of its ensemble cast. Kalki grossed over ₹1100 crore at the box office, the second 1000 Crore Club film of Prabhas.

== Film ==
Key
| † | Denotes films that have not yet been released |

- All films are in Telugu, unless mentioned otherwise.

=== Lead actor ===
List of Prabhas films as lead actor
| Year | Title | Role | Notes | Ref. |
|---|---|---|---|---|
| 2002 | Eeswar | Eeswar | | |
| 2003 | Raghavendra | Raghava | | |
| 2004 | Varsham | Venkat | | |
| 2004 | Adavi Ramudu | Ramudu | | |
| 2005 | Chakram | Chakram | | |
| 2005 | Chatrapathi | Sivaji / Chatrapathi (Note: Prabhas played a single character with two or more names) | | |
| 2006 | Pournami | Sivakeshava Naidu | | |
| 2007 | Yogi | Eeswar Prasad / Yogi | | |
| 2007 | Munna | Mahesh Kumar/Munna | | |
| 2008 | Bujjigadu | Bujji | | |
| 2009 | Billa | David Billa and Ranga (Note: Prabhas played two characters) | | |
| 2009 | Ek Niranjan | Chotu | | |
| 2010 | Darling | Prabhas "Prabha" | | |
| 2011 | Mr. Perfect | Vicky | | |
| 2012 | Rebel | Rishi / Rebel | | |
| 2013 | Mirchi | Jai | | |
| 2015 | Baahubali: The Beginning | Amarendra Baahubali , Mahendra Baahubali/Sivudu and Maharaja Veerendra Vikrama Devan (Note: Prabhas played three characters) | Simultaneously shot in Tamil | |
| 2017 | Baahubali 2: The Conclusion | Amarendra Baahubali and Mahendra Baahubali/Sivudu | | |
| 2019 | Saaho | Siddhanth Nandan Saaho / Ashok Chakravarthy | Simultaneously shot in Hindi | |
| 2022 | Radhe Shyam | Vikramaditya | Simultaneously shot in Hindi | |
| 2023 | Adipurush | Raghava | Simultaneously shot in Hindi | |
| 2023 | Salaar: Part 1 – Ceasefire | Devaratha "Deva" Raisaar (Salaar) | | |
| 2024 | Kalki 2898 AD | Bhairava and Karna | | |
| 2025 | Baahubali: The Epic | Amarendra Baahubali , Mahendra Baahubali/Sivudu and Maharaja Veerendra Vikrama Devan | Combined recut version of The Beginning and The Conclusion | |
| 2026 | The RajaSaab | Raju "Rajasaab" / Joker | | |
| 2027 | Fauzi † | Fauzi | Filming | |
| 2027 | Spirit † | TBA | Filming | |
| TBA | Kalki 2898 AD: Part 2 † | Bhairava and Karna | Filming | |

=== Other roles ===
List of Prabhas's other film appearances
| Year | Title | Role | Notes | Ref. |
|---|---|---|---|---|
| 2012 | Denikaina Ready | Himself | Voice-over | |
| 2014 | Action Jackson | Himself | Hindi film; Cameo appearance in the song "Punjabi Mast" | |
| 2025 | Kannappa | Rudra | Cameo appearance | |
| 2025 | Mirai | Narrator | Voice-over | |

== Television ==
List of Prabhas television credits
| Year | Title | Role | Network | Language | Notes | Ref. |
|---|---|---|---|---|---|---|
| 2024 | Bujji & Bhairava | Bhairava | Amazon Prime Video | Telugu | Miniseries; voice | |
| 2024 | Modern Masters: S. S. Rajamouli | Himself | Netflix | English | Documentary film | |

== Music video appearances ==
| Year | Title | Performer(s) | Notes | Ref. |
|---|---|---|---|---|
| 2022 | "Har Ghar Tiranga" | Devi Sri Prasad | | |
| 2024 | "Bhairava Anthem" | Diljit Dosanjh | For the film Kalki 2898 AD | |
