= Brindavanam (soundtrack) =

- Soundtrack Album Disc Cover

Soundtrack album by S. Thaman
- Released: 12 September 2010
- Recorded: 2010
- Genre: Feature film soundtrack
- Length: 29:14
- Language: Telugu
- Label: Aditya Music
- Producer: S.S Thaman

S. Thaman chronology
Nagaram (2010)	Brindavanam (2010)	Ragada (2010)

Brindavanam is the soundtrack to the 2010 Telugu romance film of the same name, directed by Vamsi Paidipally and starring N. T. Rama Rao Jr., Kajal Aggarwal and Samantha Ruth Prabhu. The soundtrack album originally includes eight tracks composed by S. Thaman and was released on 12 September 2010. The release coincided with a promotional event held at Shilpakala Vedika in Hyderabad, India. The album was officially released by Aditya Music. The audio went on to receive enormously positive response from reviewers and audience alike.

== Release ==
The soundtrack was composed by S. S. Thaman marking his first collaboration with both Vamsi Paidipally and N. T. Rama Rao Jr. respectively. The music was released on the night of 12 September 2010 through Aditya Music label at Shilpakala Vedika in Hyderabad and Venu Madhav and Udaya Bhanu hosted the function. Telugu film personalities including K Raghavendra Rao, S S Rajamouli, Siddharth, M. M. Keeravani, Prabhas, Samantha, Kajal Aggarwal, Koti, Boyapati Srinu, Brahmaji, K S Rama Rao, Chota K Naidu, Meher Ramesh, Sri Hari, Ashwini Dutt, Brahmanandam and Vijayan attended the audio release function.

== Track-List ==
No.	Title	Lyrics	Artist(s)	Length
1.	"Theme of Hero"	Ananta Sriram	Geetha Madhuri	0:50
2.	"Yuvakula"	Krishna Chaitanya	Remo Fernandes, Ranjith	3:56
3.	"Eyi Raja"	Ananta Sriram	Shankar Mahadevan, Shreya Ghoshal, Geetha Madhuri, Karthik (chorus), Ranjith (chorus), S.S. Thaman (chorus)	5:00
4.	"Nijamena"	Ananta Sriram	Karthik, Suchitra	4:36
5.	"Vachadura"	Ramajogayya Sastry	Ranjith, M. M. Keeravani, Koti	4:31
6.	"Oopirage"	Ramajogayya Sastry	Rahul Nambiar	3:03
7.	"Chinnadho"	Ananta Sriram	Sukhwinder Singh, Geetha Madhuri	5:03
8.	"Mojjaray"	Ananta Sriram	Baba Sehgal, Ranjith, Nikitha Nigam	2:00
Total length:				29:14

== Reception ==
The album received positive response. IndiaGlitz gave a review stating "Thaman’s a great drummer and his beats in this album stand testimony to that. He’s composed an urban album that has quite a few ‘ear’ning songs with ‘Eyi Raja’, ‘Oopiri Aage’ and ‘Mojjarey’ standing out!". Cinegoer.net gave a review stating "After Kick, Thaman S. composes for this NTR Jr. starrer, Brindavanam. In keeping with the title and possible theme of the movie, an air of celebration and Indianness dominates the music. Some of the songs have nothing new/fresh to offer while the fast-paced folk-inspired numbers are better. Overall, a decent album but nothing earth-shattering." 123telugu.com gave a review stating "Overall the songs of Brindaavanam are fast, most of them soulful, enjoyable and a touch catering to the lovers of mass numbers. Most Telugu music directors have been going the Rahman way focusing on a fast beat while the song is slow. This album is an exception, where the songs are as fast as they can get. Thaman manages to keep everyone interested with his tunes, in spite of the pressure to cater to dance needs of Jr.NTR." greatandhra.com gave a review stating "Overall, the entire album is filled with fast beats, tangy lyrics, peppy vocals. While the entire feel of the album is up and high, it would have balanced the listener’s mind if a proper slow song and a romantic melody was added to it. The heartbeat picks up at all times so the songs may go well with the youngsters but not so much for the family or the matured music lovers."
