= Varisu (soundtrack) =

2022 soundtrack album by Thaman S

- Soundtrack album cover

Soundtrack album by Thaman S
- Released: 24 December 2022
- Recorded: 2022
- Genre: Feature film soundtrack
- Length: 19:18
- Language: Tamil
- Label: T-Series
- Director: Thaman S

Thaman S chronology
Prince (2022)	Varisu (2022)	Veera Simha Reddy (2023)

Singles from Varisu
- 1. "Ranjithame" Released: 5 November 2022; 2. "Thee Thalapathy" Released: 4 December 2022; 3. "Soul of Varisu" Released: 20 December 2022

Varisu is the soundtrack album composed by Thaman S for the Tamil-language film of the same name, directed by Vamshi Paidipally starring Vijay. The album consisted of five songs written by Vivek in Tamil, Ramajogayya Sastry for the Telugu dubbed version Vaarasudu and Nishant Singh, Raqueeb Alam and Vaibhav Joshi for the Hindi dubbed version. The album was released on Christmas Eve, 24 December 2022 by T-Series, and is accompanied by three singles—"Ranjithame", "Thee Thalapathy" and "Soul of Varisu"—being released on 5 November, 4 and 20 December, respectively.

== Background ==
The film marked Thaman's first collaboration with Vijay; he was earlier intended to be associated with A. R. Murugadoss for the actor's 65th film in mid-2020. Murugadoss was later ousted by Sun Pictures as he refused to cut down the remuneration for the project, with Thaman also exiting. (Note: The film was later directed by Nelson with a new script, titled Beast (2022) and has Anirudh Ravichander scoring the music.) This film also marked his second collaboration with Vamshi Paidipally after Brindavanam (2010).

== Recording and production ==
Even before his official confirmation, in December 2021, Thaman was rumoured to compose a folk number for the film, with Senthil Ganesh and his wife Rajalakshmi, but has been reported untrue. Music sittings for the film began during April 2022, and the following month, Thaman revealed that he had completed few songs for the film. He revealed that the music compositions for the film in full swing as of June 2022. Lyricist Vivek was reported to write all the songs for the film, after previously writing songs for Mersal (2017) Sarkar (2018), Bigil (2019) and Beast, starring Vijay.

Varisu would reportedly have five songs in the album, ranging from a variety of genres. Thaman intended that the music would "foot-tapping, which would make audience dance to the songs in theatres". In October 2022, he shared a picture from the recording studio, along with folk musicians for recording a kuthu number, where they used rhythms and percussion instruments. In November, Anirudh Ravichander was reported to sing another song from the film, which was intended be released as the second single, although actor Silambarasan had reportedly sung for another track in the film (later titled "Thee Thalapathy"). The actor was involved to be participating for the song shoot. By late-November, lyricist Ramajogayya Sastry, through Twitter had confirmed that he would be writing lyrics for the songs in Vaarasudu.

Percussionist Sivamani, who worked on the film's music had said in a media interaction, that a "special song" sung by Shankar Mahadevan and Karthik was recorded at YRF Studios in Mumbai, and also indicated that the song will be performed live at the film's music event, along with Ravichander's song. Sid Sriram had recorded a song for the film, but was not chosen in the final soundtrack.

== Marketing ==
The music rights of Varisu were acquired by T-Series for a sum of ₹10 crore (US$1.1 million), the second-highest for a Tamil film. The first single from the film was reported to be released on Diwali (24 October 2022), with Thaman also confirming this at the pre-release event of Sivakarthikeyan's Prince in Hyderabad. However, the track was not released on that date. On 3 November 2022, a promo song of the single titled "Ranjithame" was released, and the full song was released on 5 November. Vijay himself sung vocals for the song, accompanied by M. M. Manasi, and sampled the song "Mocha Kotta Pallazhagi" from Ulavaali (1994). The song was dubbed in Telugu and was released on 30 November 2022 as a single. It is sung by Anurag Kulkarni and Manasi.

"Thee Thalapathy", the second single from the album was released on 4 December 2022, to commemorate the actor's 30th year in the film industry. Sung by Silambarasan, the song was accompanied with a music video featuring Silambarasan, Thaman, Vivek and Sandy Master, who choreographed for the song. The third single "Soul of Varisu", sung by K. S. Chithra was released on 20 December 2022, which was reported to be an "emotional mother-son ballad". It is the first time, Chithra had sung for a song in a Vijay-starrer film since 21 years, after "Angel Vandhaale" from Badri (2001). It was also released in Telugu under the title "Soul of Vaarasudu" with Chitra also singing the track.

"Celebration of Varisu", a bonus track heard in the film, was released on 13 January 2023.

== Release ==
It was reported that the film's audio launch will be held at the Jawaharlal Nehru Indoor Stadium in Chennai on 24 December 2022, which was officially confirmed on 21 December. Set works for the launch event began in the mid-week, and passes for the event will be distributed on the same date through Vijay's official fan club for free cost. Despite this, a section of people claimed that those passes were sold at exorbitant rates, with unofficial scalping of ₹5,000–10,000. Members of the fan club, advised fans to be warned on scammers who usurp money from people.

The launch event saw the attendance of thousands of fans, with celebrities and the film's cast and crew in attendance. The songs from the film were performed live by Thaman and his musical team, which included the yet to be released songs: "Jimikki Ponnu" sung by Anirudh Ravichander and Jonita Gandhi, and "Vaa Thalaiva" sung by Shankar Mahadevan and Karthik, which were released along with the album. The broadcasting rights of the event were acquired by the film's satellite partner Sun TV, and is intended to premiere on New Year's Day (1 January 2023), instead of a live telecast.

== Track listing ==
All lyrics are written by Vivek.

Varisu (Original)
No.	Title	Singer(s)	Length
1.	"Ranjithame"	Vijay, M. M. Manasi	04:47
2.	"Thee Thalapathy"	Silambarasan	04:11
3.	"Soul of Varisu"	K. S. Chithra	02:08
4.	"Jimikki Ponnu"	Anirudh Ravichander, Jonita Gandhi	03:44
5.	"Vaa Thalaiva"	Karthik, Shankar Mahadevan, Thaman S, Deepak Blue, Aravind Srinivas	04:28
6.	"Celebration of Varisu"	Thaman S	02:48
Total length:			22:06

All lyrics are written by Ramajogayya Sastry.

Vaarasudu (Telugu)
No.	Title	Singer(s)	Length
1.	"Ranjithame"	Anurag Kulkarni, M. M. Manasi	04:46
2.	"Sye Dalapathi"	Rahul Nambiar, Deepak Blue, Harika Narayan	04:04
3.	"Soul of Vaarasudu"	K. S. Chithra	02:07
4.	"Chemiki Kannu"	Thaman S, K. Pranati	03:45
5.	"Le Padara"	M. M. Srilekha, Deepak Blue, Rohit, Karthik	04:28
6.	"Celebration of Vaarasudu"	Thaman S	02:48
Total length:			22:06

Varisu (Hindi)
No.	Title	Lyrics	Singer(s)	Length
1.	"Ranjithame"	Nishant Singh	Harshvardhan Wavre, M. M. Manasi	04:46
2.	"Thee Thalapathy Song"	Vaibhav Joshi	Rahul Nambiar, Deepak Blue	04:04
3.	"Mother Song(Soul of Varisu)"	Vaibhav Joshi	Madhushree	02:07
4.	"Jimki Song"	Raqueeb Alam	Harshvardhan Wavre, Nikitha Gandhi	03:45
5.	"Vaa Thalaiva"	Raqueeb Alam	Raja Hasan, Sayali Jhare, Jasraj Joshi, Jaydeep Vaidya	04:28
Total length:				19:13

== Background score ==
Varisu

Film score by Thaman S
- Released: 17 August 2023
- Recorded: 2021–2023
- Genre: Film score
- Length: 57:00
- Language: Tamil
- Label: T-Series
- Producer: Thaman S

Thaman S chronology
Prince (2022)	Varisu (2023)	Veera Simha Reddy (2023)
External audio
- Film Score on YouTube

No.	Title	Length
1.	"Vedargal"	3:32
2.	"Thalaivan (Orchestral)"	4:57
3.	"Adhirvu"	1:51
4.	"Ammaavin Thaalaattu"	4:25
5.	"Ammi Ammi"	1:08
6.	"Adhe Nilaa"	0:54
7.	"Kaavalan"	2:46
8.	"Yekkam"	1:32
9.	"Ratham (Home Coming)"	1:24
10.	"The Boss Returns"	3:32
11.	"Aadukalam"	2:54
12.	"Aatanaayagan"	1:00
13.	"Pagai"	2:42
14.	"Dharmayutham"	1:08
15.	"Thuruppu"	1:05
16.	"Thiruppi Kudukkum Neram"	1:56
17.	"Thee Thalapathy - Orchestral - Thalapathee"	4:32
18.	"Uravu"	2:18
19.	"Ranjitham"	1:05
20.	"Appaavinaasai"	3:32
21.	"Ammaavin Aasai"	2:02
22.	"Mudhal Naayagan"	6:34
Total length:		57:05

== Reception ==
Indiaglitz called the single "Ranjithame" as "high on energy with powerful vocals of Thalapathy Vijay and Manasi MM. Especially, the final minute of the song is a total treat for everyone", while The Indian Express mentioned that the song "lives up to the hype". Khushboo Ratda of Pinkvilla, reviewing "Thee Thalapathy" called it as "a true tribute to Thalapathy Vijay's cinematic excellence". Behindwoods gave 2.75 out of 5 to the album stating "Thaman delivers special beats for Thalapathy Vijay, which will appeal to the masses." Siddharth Srinivas of Only Kollywood wrote "Varisu brings a set of enjoyable tunes from Thaman, which shine with energy and Thalapathy references throughout. The songs are enjoyable for sure, in Thaman’s zone even though some would feel that they could have been even better. For now, this is a punchy album that will light up even more with the visuals!" Moviecrow wrote "Thaman delivers a predictable Vijay movie soundtrack filled with catchy songs which are enough to rule the charts for a while".

== Commercial performance ==
"Soul of Varisu" topped the Billboard Hot Trending Songs chart released for the week of 22 December 2022, thereby becoming the first South Indian song to achieve the feat.
