= Vamshi Paidipally =

Indian filmmaker

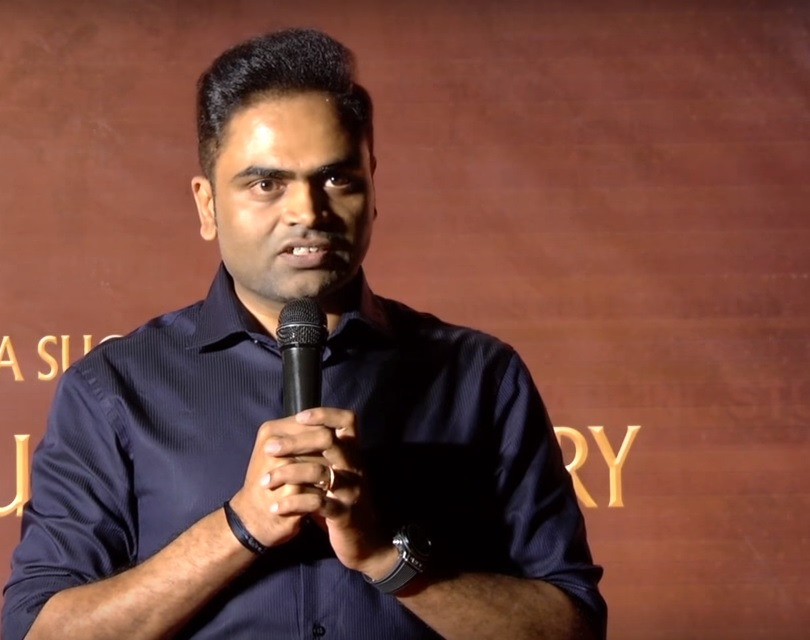
- Paidipally in 2018
- Born: Paidipally Vamshidhar Rao; 27 July 1979 (age 47); Khanapur, Nirmal, Telangana, India
- Occupations: Film director; screenwriter
- Years active: 2007–present
- Spouse: Malini (m. 2007)
- Children: 1

Paidipally Vamshidhar Rao (born 27 July 1979), also known as Vamshi Paidipally, is an Indian film director and screenwriter who works predominantly in Telugu and a few Tamil films. He is best known for directing mainstream film works such as Munna (2007), Brindavanam (2010), Yevadu (2014), Oopiri (2016), Maharshi (2019) and Varisu (2023). Vamshi Paidipally has won a National Film Award for Maharshi.

== Early life ==
Vamshi Paidipally was born on 27 July 1979 in Khanapur of Nirmal district, Telangana. His parents, who hail from Bheemaram near Jagtial town own a cinema hall in Khanapur. He did his schooling in Hyderabad Public School and his intermediate from Little Flower Junior College. then, He completed his bachelor's degree in commerce and Master's in Computer Applications from Osmania University and he had worked as a software engineer in Hyderabad.

== Career ==
Vamshi Paidipally began his film career by working as an assistant film director in films Eeswar (2002) and Varsham (2004). While working for the movie Bhadra (2005) producer Dil Raju offered to produce him a film under his production house. He made his directorial debut with Prabhas-starrer Munna (2007). It was an average venture at the box office. He later directed Brindavanam starring NTR Jr which was a commercial success. It is followed by Yevadu (2014) featuring Allu Arjun and Ram Charan.

His 2016 Telugu-Tamil bilingual film Oopiri/Thozha, an adaptation of the French film The Intouchables (2011) starring Karthi and Nagarjuna was a critical and commercial success. The film won him his Filmfare Award for Best Director – Telugu. In 2019, he collaborated with actor Mahesh Babu for Maharshi. The film won National Film Award for Best Popular Film Providing Wholesome Entertainment.

In September 2021, he was signed to direct Vijay's 66th film produced by Dil Raju titled Varisu.

== Personal life ==
Vamsi Paidipally married Malini in 2007 and the couple has a daughter. They live in Hyderabad.

== Filmography ==
Key
†	Denotes films that have not yet been released

- All films are in Telugu unless otherwise noted.

Year	Title	Language	Notes	Ref.
2007	Munna	Telugu	Cameo appearance	
2010	Brindavanam	Telugu		
2014	Yevadu	Telugu		
2016	Oopiri	Telugu; Tamil	Tamil version titled Thozha; Filmfare Award for Best Director - Telugu	
2019	Maharshi	Telugu	National Film Award for Best Popular Film Providing Wholesome Entertainment; SIIMA Award for Best Director- Telugu	
2023	Varisu	Tamil		
2027	SVC 63 †	Hindi	Hindi film Debut	

=== Recurring collaborations ===
List of Vamshi Paidpally recurring collaborations
Film	Prakash Raj	Kota Srinivasa Rao	Tanikella Bharani	Jayasudha	Brahmaji	Raghu Karumanchi	Prabhas Sreenu	Marthand K. Venkatesh	Praveen K. L.
Munna (2007)	Yes	Yes	Yes		Yes		Yes	Yes	
Brindavanam (2010)	Yes	Yes	Yes		Yes	Yes	Yes	Yes	
Yevadu (2014)		Yes		Yes		Yes	Yes	Yes	
Oopiri / Thozha (2016)	Yes		Yes	Yes		Yes	Thozha; deleted scene in Oopiri		Thozha
Maharshi (2019)	Cameo	Yes	Yes	Yes	Yes				Yes
Varisu (2023)	Yes			Yes					Yes
