= Brindavanam (2010 film) =

2010 film by Vamsi Paidipally

- Movie poster
- Directed by: Vamsi Paidipally
- Screenplay by: Vamsi Paidipally
- Story by: Vamsi Paidipally
- Dialogues by: Koratala Siva
- Produced by: Dil Raju; Sirish; Laxman
- Starring: N. T. Rama Rao Jr. Kajal Aggarwal; Samantha
- Cinematography: Chota K. Naidu
- Edited by: Marthand K Venkatesh
- Music by: S. Thaman
- Production company: Sri Venkateswara Creations
- Distributed by: Sri Venkateswara Creations
- Release date: 14 October 2010
- Running time: 170 minutes
- Country: India
- Language: Telugu
- Budget: ₹30 crore
- Box office: ₹35 crore distributors' share

Brindavanam is a 2010 Indian Telugu-language romantic action comedy film written and directed by Vamsi Paidipally. The film stars N. T. Rama Rao Jr., Samantha, and Kajal Aggarwal while Prakash Raj and Srihari play pivotal roles. The film was produced by Dil Raju's Sri Venkateswara Creations, and the music was composed by S. Thaman.

The film follows Indu (Samantha), who requests her boyfriend Krishna, or Krish ( N. T. Rama Rao Jr), to assist her friend Bhoomi (Kajal Aggarwal), who is being compelled into a marriage. Krish goes to Bhoomi's hometown, posing as her boyfriend. However, his charade reveals not only the forced marriage, but a complex web of family issues, plunging him into an emotional conflict he did not foresee.

The film released on 14 October 2010 and was a critical and commercial success. The film was remade in six other languages: as Love Master (2012) in Odia, Brindavana (2013) in Kannada, Khoka 420 (2013) in Indian Bengali, Buk Fatey To Mukh Foteyna (2012) in Bangladeshi Bengali, Vrundavan (2016) in Marathi, and Hum Hai Jodi No 1 (2016) in Bhojpuri.

== Plot ==
Krish, the son of the Hyderabad multimillionaire Surendra, pretends to be in a relationship with Bhoomi to help her escape an unwanted marriage. Krish arrives in Bhoomi's village and transforms her family dynamics, including arranging a reconciliation between Bhoomi's father, Bhanu Prasad, and his step-brother Sivudu. Impressed by Krish, Bhanu Prasad agrees to Bhoomi's marriage with him. Bhoomi's suitor then seeks revenge.

Indu, Krish's love interest, lies about her lover ditching her, leading to a series of misunderstandings. Bhanu Prasad and Sivudu want Krish's parents to finalize the marriage, prompting Krish to invent fake parents until his real parents unexpectedly arrive.

Indu overhears Bhoomi revealing her love for Krish. Bhoomi's suitor exposes the truth to Sivudu and Bhanu Prasad, resulting in a violent confrontation. Durga Prasad, the family patriarch, intervenes and unveils the deception to protect Bhoomi from her suitor. It is also revealed that Bhoomi is in love with Krish.

Bhoomi's suitor kidnaps her, leading to a confrontation with Krish, who rescues Bhoomi. However, Krish is torn between his love for Indu and Bhoomi. Lord Krishna appears but does not provide a solution, leaving Krish's fate to the audience.

== Cast ==
- N. T. Rama Rao Jr. as Krishna "Krish"
- Kajal Aggarwal as Bhoomi
- Samantha Ruth Prabhu as Indu
- Prakash Raj as Bhanu Prasad, Bhoomi's father
- Srihari as Shiva Prasad alias Sivudu, Bhanu Prasad's step-brother, Indu's father
- Kota Srinivasa Rao as Durga Prasad, Bhoomi and Indu's grandfather
- Mukesh Rishi as Surendra, Krish's father
- Pragathi as Krish's mother
- Ajay as Bhoomi's cousin
- Tanikella Bharani as Ajay's father
- Brahmanandam as "Bommarillu" father
- Hema as "Bommarillu" father's wife
- Venu Madhav as Chitti
- Brahmaji as Bhoomi's uncle
- Ahuti Prasad as Bhoomi's uncle
- Raghu Babu as Bhoomi's uncle
- Shanoor Sana as Bhoomi's aunt
- Surekha Vani as Bhoomi's aunt
- Sithara as Sivudu's wife
- Vijay Sai as Krish's friend
- Fish Venkat as Sivudu's henchmen
- Prabhas Sreenu as Goon
- Supreeth as Goon
- Raghu Karumanchi as Goon
- Sr. N.T.R. as Lord Krishna (extended cameo, computerized)

== Production ==
=== Development ===
"The sprawling house set should resemble Lord Krishna’s Brindavanam. Color combination played a vital role. We used peacocks and other innovative colors. I sat with the director for a month and a half to draw the sketches. Vamsi works on minute details. Most of the movie was shot in this house set which was erected in an open place in Hyderabad suburbs.
— Art director Anand Sai, 2012

In mid-July 2009, it was informed that Dil Raju would produce a film with Jr. N.T.R. titled Brindavanam with the caption Govindudu Andari Vadele which would be directed by Vamsi Paidipally who worked with Dil Raju previously in 2007 for the Average grosser Munna which starred Prabhas and Ileana. It was also said that the film would start its shoot in September 2009. The film was launched at Annapurna Studios in Hyderabad on 15 August 2009. On that day, it was declared that S. Thaman composed the music, Chota K. Naidu handled the Cinematography, Koratala Siva penned the dialogues while the duo Ram-Lakshman composed the fights for the film. A Traditional and beautiful Villa set was constructed by Art director Anand Sai near Bachupally in 3 out of 4 acres land with the rest 1 acre utilized for a beautiful garden arrangement with refreshing environment which was dismantled on the film's completion.

A. S. Prakash and Anand Sai were the art directors of the film, while Ram and Lakshman composed the fight sequences of the film.

=== Casting ===
Initially, it was said that Dil Raju opted to select a new heroine opposite N. T. Rama Rao Jr. in this film. Kajal Aggarwal was selected as the heroine. By late November 2009, it was informed that one of the heroines was yet to be confirmed while Kota Srinivasa Rao, Prakash Raj and Srihari would appear in crucial roles. During an interaction with the media, Kajal Aggarwal revealed about her character in the film in mid January 2010. She spoke "My character in the film is more like myself. It has been great working with NTR and the director Vamsi Paidipalli. I play Bhoomi in the film, who is very reserved and quite an introvert. I am enjoying every moment working for the film". Even before the release of her debut film Ye Maaya Chesave on 19 February, Samantha Ruth Prabhu was selected as the second heroine in mid-February 2010.

=== Filming ===
Though it was planned that the film would start its shooting from 27 November 2009, the filming ultimately started from 1 December 2009 as N. T. Rama Rao Jr.'s preceding project Adhurs was in its final stage of production. The shooting continued in Pollachi at Tamil Nadu and there the first schedule of the shoot was completed. The makers planned the second schedule from 21 December to 6 January in Hyderabad. During the shoot of the second schedule, when the filming was continuing inside the Government Junior College on the Qurshid Jha Devidi premises at Hussainialam in the old city area of Hyderabad, a group of Telangana Rashtra Samithi activists assembled at the entrance. The agitators urged the film unit to stop the shooting, and when the director came out to pacify them, the protesters urged him to raise the Jai Telangana slogan and left as the latter obliged. In the end of January 2010, a chase sequence was shot near Shabdalaya Studios at Banjara Hills in Hyderabad under the supervision of Peter Hynes. In early February 2010, it was reported that the shooting continued in Pollachi again from 19 February 2010. After returning from Pollachi, the shooting continued in a specially constructed set at Miyapur in Hyderabad in the end of February 2010. Then it was reported that the shooting would continue at Badami in Karnataka and parts of Kerala after completion of the scheduled shoot in the House.

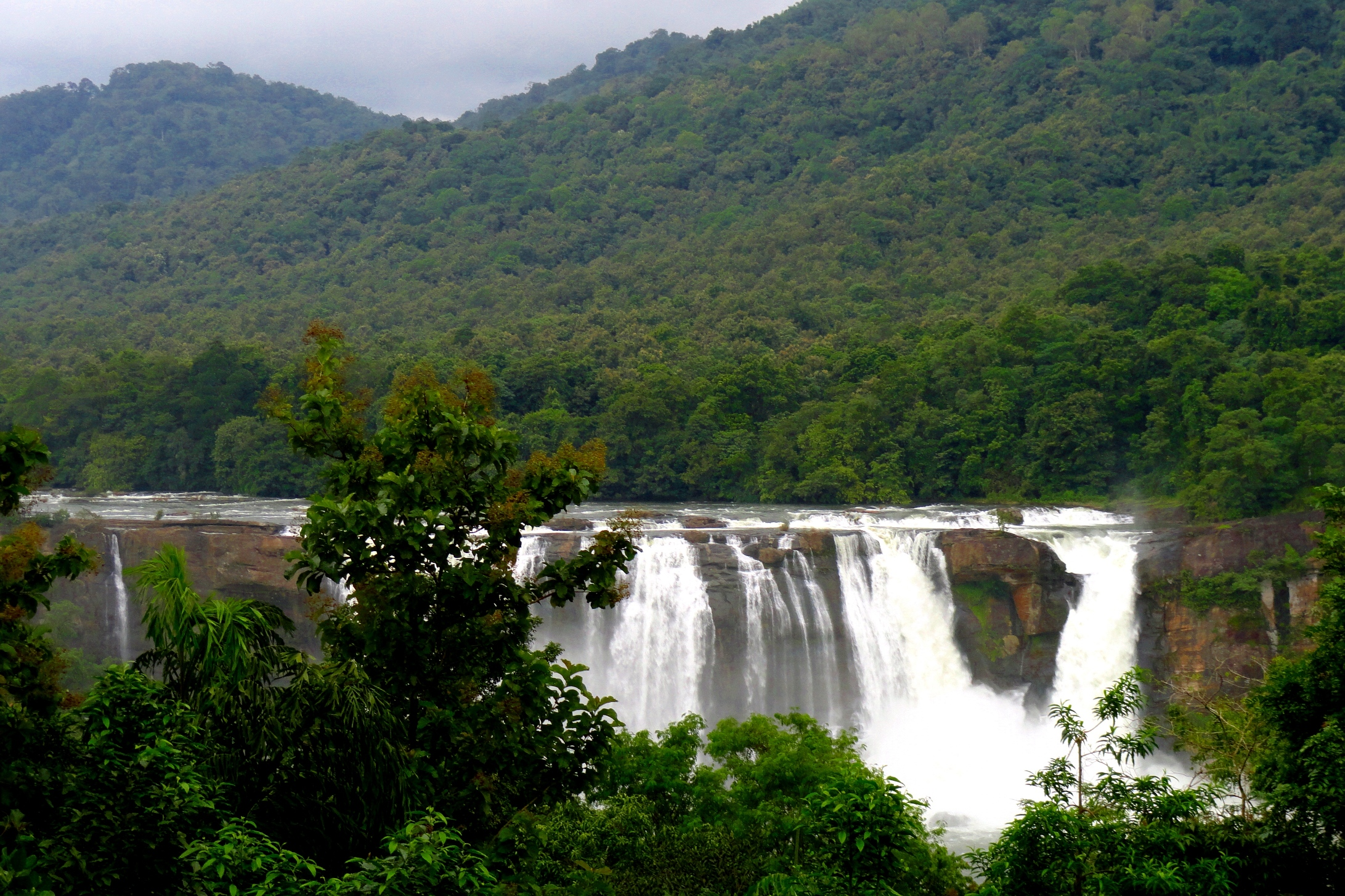
Athirappilly Falls in Thrissur district of Kerala where parts of the film's climax and few crucial sequences were shot.

After a brief gap, the shooting continued at Vikarabad forest area in the end of June 2010, where a fight sequence was shot under the supervision of prominent fight choreographers Ram-Lakshman. However, the shooting was postponed for a week due to the sudden death of Kota Srinivasa Rao's son Kota Prasad. After canning a couple of fights and songs, the filming was said to continue in the beautiful locales of Greece with one of the two songs left to be picturised to be shot. In early August 2010, N. T. Rama Rao Jr. joined the sets of the film at the Villa set constructed at Bachupally. There the climax sequence was shot from 12 August 2010 which was followed by a song shoot on the leads at Annapurna Studios.

But N. T. Rama Rao Jr. was injured on the sets while performing a stunt sequence with ropes near Kokapet Mines. He was immediately rushed to KIMS hospital in Begumpet and got six stitches on his forehead. He was discharged by afternoon but was advised a 3-day rest by the doctors thus delaying the shoot. Later a part of the climax sequence and some crucial sequences were shot in Kerala at Chalakudy near Cochin including Athirapally waterfalls. Later the filming continued in Switzerland for 10 days where the song "Nijamena" was shot on N. T. Rama Rao Jr. and Kajal Aggarwal. After some patch work, the entire shooting ended on 15 September 2010.

== Soundtrack ==
The soundtrack was composed by S. S. Thaman marking his first collaboration with both Vamsi Paidipally and N. T. Rama Rao Jr. respectively. The music was released on the night of 12 September 2010 through Aditya Music label at Shilpakala Vedika in Hyderabad and Venu Madhav and Udaya Bhanu hosted the function. Telugu film personalities including K Raghavendra Rao, S S Rajamouli, Siddharth, M. M. Keeravani, Prabhas, Samantha, Kajal Aggarwal, Koti, Boyapati Srinu, Brahmaji, K S Rama Rao, Chota K Naidu, Meher Ramesh, Sri Hari, Ashwini Dutt, Brahmanandam and Vijayan attended the audio release function. The album received positive response from critics.

== Release ==
In mid March 2010, when the filming was nearly 60% complete, Dil Raju announced that the film is being planned for a Mid July release. However, later in the end of August 2010, it was announced that the film would release on 1 October 2010 worldwide. But in the end of September 2010, the release date was shifted to 8 October 2010. The release of Mahesh Babu's Khaleja made matters worse and the film's release date was further shifted to 14 October 2010. Though it was rumored that the film's release was preponed to 9 October 2010 due to N. T. Rama Rao Jr.'s fans' pressure, Dil Raju confirmed that the film would release on 14 October 2010 in order to ensure a gap of a week from the release of Khaleja. On 8 October 2010 the film was awarded an U/A certificate from Central Board of Film Certification.

=== Distribution ===
The film was distributed by Sri Venkateswara Creations all over Andhra Pradesh. In early April 2010, the film's USA screening rights were sold to BlueSky Cinemas, Inc. along with Rama Rama Krishna Krishna which was also produced by Dil Raju. In mid April 2010, EuroAndhra released a press note confirming that they acquired the screening rights of the film along with Rama Rama Krishna Krishna and Siddharth starrer Baava in UK/EU and they thanked BlueSky Cinemas, Inc. for giving them the opportunity.

=== Reception ===
The film generally received positive reviews from critics. NDTV gave a review stating, "Vamsi, now proves that he, too, can top the Box Office with his subject and narration of a story. Koratala Siva's dialogues and Chota K Naidu's camera have helped him to realise his dream of putting together a good entertainer. NTR's performance is unquestionably the highlight of the film. " Idlebrain.com gave a review stating "First half of the movie is adequate. The major part of the second half is entertaining. The climax of the movie is debatable. The plus points are NTR and entertainment in the second half. On the flip side, the story of the movie gives us a deja vu feeling in many aspects and the emotional part should have been natural. Brindavanam is a decent and clean movie with enough ingredients to make it work at the box office. It is up to NTR to get a range for the movie" and rated the film 3.25/5.

== Accolades ==
| Award (Note: Awards, festivals and organizations are in alphabetical order.) | Date of ceremony (Note: Date is linked to the article about the awards held that year, wherever possible.) | Category | Recipient(s) | Result | Ref. |
|---|---|---|---|---|---|
| Nandi Awards | 5 August 2011 | Best Audiographer | Radhakrishna Eskala | Won | |
| Filmfare Awards South | 2 July 2011 | Best Choreography | Raju Sundaram | Won | |
| CineMAA Awards | 20 June 2011 | Best Actress | Kajal Agarwal | Won | |

== Remakes ==
The film was remade in Odia as Love Master (2012), in Bangladeshi Bengali as Buk Fatey To Mukh Foteyna (2012), in Bengali as Khoka 420 (2013), in Kannada as Brindavana (2013), in Marathi as Vrundavan (2016), and in Bhojpuri as Hum Hai Jodi No 1 (2016).
