= Pan-Indian film =

Term related to Indian cinema

- Years active: 2015–present
- Location: India
- Major figures: S. S. Rajamouli
- Influenced: Cinema of India

Pan-Indian film is a term related to Indian cinema that originated with Telugu cinema as a mainstream commercial cinema appealing to audiences across the country with a spread to world markets.

S. S. Rajamouli pioneered the pan-Indian film movement with his duology of epic action films, Baahubali: The Beginning (2015) and Baahubali 2: The Conclusion (2017). These films marked a significant shift in the Indian film industry, redefining its demographic reach and appeal.

A pan-Indian film is typically marketed and released in multiple languages across India, including Telugu, Hindi, Tamil, Malayalam, Kannada and other regional languages. Such films aim to transcend linguistic, demographic, social, regional, ethnic and cultural barriers, seeking to resonate with a wide audience.

== History ==
Indian cinema is composed of various language film industries. Traditionally, most Indian films targeted local audiences by filming in regional languages. These movies leaned heavily into specific slang, dialects, and history to resonate with their native speakers. Films are often remade in multiple languages, examples being Anuraga Aralithu (1986), Nuvvostanante Nenoddantana (2005) and Drishyam (2013). Films are also dubbed into other languages and released with localised titles either on the same release date or at a later date. Films such as Dilwale Dulhania Le Jayenge and Enthiran, were dubbed in other Indian languages and were released along with their original versions.

According to The Times of India, the first pan-Indian film is the 1959 Kannada movie Mahishasura Mardini. It was dubbed and released in seven other languages but since then no other film was released in more than five languages.

Indian Cinema industries often remake each other's works, Between 2000 and 2019, one in every three successful films made in Hindi was either a remake or part of a series. And most of the star actors, have starred in the hit remakes of South Indian films. Since 2010s, dubbing and telecasting of South Indian films (primarily Telugu and Tamil) in Hindi became a regular practice by which films from Telugu cinema and Tamil cinema gained popularity in the Hindi speaking regions. Majority of these films were dubbed after few weeks or months of the original version release. Similarly, Hindi films were frequently dubbed in Telugu and Tamil languages, but didn't gain as much popularity in Telugu and Tamil speaking regions as Telugu/Tamil films received, except a few like Dangal (2016), M.S. Dhoni: The Untold Story (2016).

== Growth ==
"A pan-Indian film does not mean that actors from different languages come together. That's all part of it. A pan-Indian film means a story and emotion that connects to everyone irrespective of the language. While creating a story, I think 'If I switch off this dialogue portion, will the audience still connect to my movie?' Many times, the answer is a yes."

— S. S. Rajamouli, the director of Baahubali duology and RRR

S. S. Rajamouli pioneered "Pan-Indian” cinema with his duology of epic action films, Baahubali: The Beginning (2015) and Baahubali 2: The Conclusion (2017), which became massive critical and commercial successes both nationally and internationally. Baahubali 2 became the highest grossing Indian film of all time. The success of these films, which were released in various languages worldwide, sparked a new approach to filmmaking. Such films aim to transcend linguistic, demographic, social, regional, ethnic, and cultural barriers, seeking to resonate with a wide audience. Srivatsan S of The Hindu noted that Telugu cinema excelled in marketing pan-Indian films, primarily using two strategies: promoting films outside their home territory and collaborating with regional stars for increased visibility. Jeremy Fuster of TheWrap identified ingredients of pan Indian cinema as–high budgets, cast actors with national notoriety, and rooted in mythology, history or stories that are resonant with all Indians and high quality dubbing in all Indian languages.

Kannada film KGF: Chapter 1 (2018) directed by Prashanth Neel also released in five languages, thereby becoming the first major Pan-Indian film from Kannada cinema.

Following the success of the Telugu films Pushpa: The Rise (2021) and RRR (2022), Rahul Devulapalli of The Week identified "Content, marketing, [and] indulgent overseas audience" have led to the rise of pan-Indian films from Telugu cinema.

Pan-Indian films also employ actors from different language industry to increase their visibility and bring a universal appeal. In an interview with Film Companion, filmmaker Karan Johar said: "Pan-India is a phenomenon we cannot diminish or dilute."

== Notable films considered to be pan-Indian ==
Year	Title	Director	Original language(s)	Ref.
2015	Baahubali: The Beginning	S. S. Rajamouli	Telugu	
2017	Baahubali 2: The Conclusion	S. S. Rajamouli	Telugu	
2018	2.0	S. Shankar	Tamil	
2018	KGF: Chapter 1	Prashanth Neel	Kannada	
2021	Pushpa: The Rise	Sukumar	Telugu	
2022	RRR	S. S. Rajamouli	Telugu	
2022	KGF: Chapter 2	Prashanth Neel	Kannada	
2022	Brahmāstra: Part One – Shiva	Ayan Mukerji	Hindi	
2023	Animal	Sandeep Reddy Vanga	Hindi	
2023	Salaar: Part 1 – Ceasefire	Prashanth Neel	Telugu	
2024	Kalki 2898 AD	Nag Ashwin	Telugu	
2024	Pushpa 2: The Rule	Sukumar	Telugu	
2025	Kantara: Chapter 1	Rishab Shetty	Kannada	

== Criticism and discourse ==
Several actors, filmmakers and critics have criticised the usage of the term "Pan Indian". In an interview with Deadline Hollywood, actor N. T. Rama Rao Jr said, "I hate referring to it as 'pan-Indian', it sounds like a frying pan. We just mean it is a film that can travel into all the Indian languages". Speaking with PTI, Dulquer Salmaan said: "The word pan-India really irks me. I just don't like hearing it. I love that there is so much exchange of talent happening in cinema, it's great, but we are one country. I don't think anyone says pan-America." Kamal Haasan felt the concept of Pan-Indian cinema always existed, and criticised the term as a new "coinage".

Prabhas, who played the protagonist of Baahubali series, opined that the industry should make "Indian" films instead of "pan-Indian" films. Actor Siddharth echoed the same. He felt the term pan-Indian was a "very disrespectful word" as its use was limited to non-Hindi films. Writer-actor Adivi Sesh felt that "the word is somewhat abused," and used like a euphemism for dubbed film.

Bharti Dubey and Hemachandra Ethamukkala of The Times of India stated that the pan-Indian films have mostly been action films and criticised the perceived violence in such films. Writing for The Swaddle, Rohitha Naraharisetty feels pan-Indian films glorify toxic masculinity and the "angry young man" archetype, while suffering from underdeveloped and heavily objectified female characters.

== See also ==
- Parallel cinema
- Transnational cinema
- World cinema
