= Bujjigadu =

- Directed by: Puri Jagannadh
- Written by: Puri Jagannadh
- Produced by: K. S. Rama Rao
- Starring: Prabhas; Mohan Babu; Trisha; Sanjjana
- Cinematography: Shyam K. Naidu
- Edited by: M. R. Varma
- Music by: Sandeep Chowta
- Production company: Creative Commercials
- Distributed by: Creative Commercials
- Release date: 22 May 2008
- Running time: 146 minutes
- Country: India
- Language: Telugu

Bujjigadu: Made in Chennai, or simply Bujjigadu, is a 2008 Indian Telugu-language action comedy film written and directed by Puri Jagannadh, and produced by K. S. Rama Rao. The film stars Prabhas as the title character alongside Mohan Babu, Trisha, Sanjjana and Kota Srinivasa Rao. In the film, Bujji (Prabhas) and Chitti (Trisha) are two childhood friends who can't live without seeing each other. One day they have an altercation due to which Chitti asks Bujji not to meet her for twelve years, but she promises that she will marry him when they meet after twelve years. The rest of the story is about how they meet each other.

The film opened to primarily mixed to positive reviews from critics, although Prabhas’s performance received acclaim. Bujjigadu emerged as an commercial success It was later remade in Bangladesh as Pagla Deewana (2015) with Shahriaz and Pori Moni.

== Plot ==
1996: Bujji and Chitti are inseparable childhood friends in Vizag and like each other. One day, they argue and Chitti tells Bujji to leave and never return. When he pleads to her, she asks him to prove his sincerity by staying away from her for twelve years and promises to marry him if he does. Though devastated, Bujji reluctantly agrees to stay away from her and moves to Chennai to keep a distance. Meanwhile, Chitti's family moves to Hyderabad, cutting all ties from Bujji's family.

2008: Bujji grows up in Chennai and becomes a hooligan, though he preserves his soft nature and his love for Chitti. After twelve years, he returns to meet Chitti but is caught in a brawl and is jailed. There, he meets the sons of Machi Reddy, and they offer him one crore to kill Sivanna. Bujji thinks that he could save money for his married life and agrees, and escapes jail. Meanwhile, a woman goes to vizag to bujji's house to ask about him, whether he came back for her, hinting that she is Chitti, his childhood friend. bujji goes to his home but hides that he is bujji from his father in order to find chitti. when Bujji tries to kill Sivanna, he is injured. Sivanna is impressed by his innocence and purity and asks him to stay with him for a while. He stays there under the name of Rajinikanth, Bujji's favorite actor.

Later, Bujji meets Sivanna's sister Meghana, whose real name is Chitti. However, Bujji is unable to recognize her as Chitti. Bujji eventually realises that Meghana was Chitti and tries to reveal that to her, but Sivanna stops him, saying that Meghana would only stay with him until she finds Bujji, as she actually hates her brother since he was responsible for his first wife's death. When Machi Reddy learns that he is part of Sivanna's gang, his sons shoot Chitti, kidnap Sivanna's second sister Kangana, and ask to trade her for Sivanna. Chitti sends Bujji to save Kangana. Bujji and Sivanna head to rescue Kangana, with Sivanna killing one of Machi Reddy's sons. Machi Reddy with Bujji kills Machi Reddy's second son with his shoe blade trick, and Venkat is left beaten, but not killed like some of Machi Reddy's goons. Sivanna is injured but survives and Kangana is rescued. After recovery, he asks Bujji and Chitti what the fight they had in their childhood was about. Bujji states that one time on the beach, Chitti had built a sand temple with a stone as a representation for her God, but Bujji had destroyed it and it made her angry. The film ends with Chitti reuniting with Bujji and living with Sivanna.

== Cast ==
- Prabhas as Lingaraju a.k.a Rajinikanth a.k.a. Bujjigadu
  - Akash Puri as young Bujji
- Mohan Babu as Sivanna
- Trisha as K. Meghana a.k.a. Chitti
  - Pavithra Jagannadh as young Chitti
- Sanjjana as Kangana
- Kota Srinivasa Rao as Machi Reddy
- Raja Ravindra as Advocate Raju
- Subbaraju as Venkat
- Ajay as Machi Reddy's son
- Supreeth as Machi Reddy's son
- M. S. Narayana as Prabhas Raju
- Ali as Sarparaju Kaatre / Bokadia / Kuflee
- Sunil as Sathi / Tokyo Jaani
- Satyam Rajesh as Bujji's friend in Chennai
- Jaya Prakash Reddy as Minister
- Jeeva as Visakhapatnam Central Jail Police Inspector
- Brahmaji as Brahmaji, Sivanna's henchman
- Ahuti Prasad as Real Estate Venkat Rao
- Kadambari Kiran as Bus Conductor
- Gautam Raju as Singing man in Vizag
- Ponnambalam as Goon in Chennai wedding
- Besant Ravi as "Kozhi Kadai" Arumugam
- Khayyum as Sivanna's henchman
- Prabhas Sreenu as Sivanna's henchman
- Mumaith Khan as Chitti from Chilakaluru in the song "Chitti Aayire" (special appearance)
- Sudha as Lakshmi, Chitti's mother
- Hema as Hemalatha, Bujji's mother
- Pragathi as Lakshmi, Sivanna's wife
- Sri Lalitha as Baby, Bujji's friend
- Fish Venkat as Machi Reddy's henchman (uncredited)
- Prabhakar as Goon in Chennai fight (uncredited)

== Production ==
The film marks the third collaboration between Prabhas and Trisha after Varsham (2004) and Pournami (2006). Prabhas plays a man who lived in Chennai and is a fan of Rajinikanth. A song was shot in Annapoorna Studios.

== Music ==
The soundtrack for the film was composed by Sandeep Chowta and released on 18 April 2008 by Aditya Music with Rajinikanth in attendance. In an audio review of the soundtrack, a writer from Idlebrain.com wrote that "most of Chowta’s tunes (Sude Sude, Love Me, Guchhi Guchhi, Dhadak Dhadak) are catchy and his orchestration, imbued with sounds of international quality, is top class but where he falters [...] is with the singing. To some his rendition may sound stylish but to most others, like me, it sounds as if Sandeep was told that he is singing for a robot on the screen".

Bujjigadu

Soundtrack album by Sandeep Chowta
- Released: 18 April 2008
- Recorded: 2008
- Genre: Soundtrack
- Length: 24:38
- Label: Aditya Music
- Producer: Sandeep Chowta

Sandeep Chowta chronology
Om Shanti Om (2007)	Bujjigadu (2008)	Thoda Pyaar Thoda Magic (2008)

Track list
No.	Title	Lyrics	Singer(s)	Length
1.	"Talaiva"	Bhaskarabhatla Ravi Kumar	Mark Lazaro, Anaida	4:03
2.	"Sudu Sude"	Bhaskarabhatla Ravi Kumar	Sandeep Chowta, Shruti Pathak	4:11
3.	"Chitti Aayire"	Bhaskarabhatla Ravi Kumar	Pradip Somasundaran, Sonu Kakkar	4:50
4.	"Love Me"	Kandikonda	Sandeep Chowta, Nikita Nigam	4:07
5.	"Guchchi Guchchi"	Kandikonda	Sandeep Chowta, Shruti Pathak	3:14
6.	"Dhadak Dhadak"	Kandikonda	Sandeep Chowta, Nikita Nigam	4:13
Total length:				24:38

== Release and reception ==
The film was released worldwide with 750 prints. It was dubbed in Malayalam as Rudran and in Tamil as Kumaran Rajini Rasigan. It was dubbed in Hindi as Deewar: Man Of Power and it was dubbed in Bhojpuri as Yeh Deewar.

Jeevi of Idlebrain.com wrote that "This film is definitely worth a look for Prabhas's characterization". A critic from Rediff.com rated the film 2 1/2 out of 5 stars and wrote that "Bujjigadu may perhaps provide Prabhas the much needed hit but it offers nothing drastically new". In a more critical review, a critic from Full Hyderabad wrote that "The songs by Sandeep Chowtha are trendy and peppy, and will perhaps help an otherwise insipid movie. Insipid for more reasons than one, including some pretty elementary writing, like that whole 12-year thing, and lines like "I love you saala (transl. brother-in-law)". Watch Bujjigadu if you are at a loss for anything else, and, oh yes, if you are an adult".
