= Eeswar =

2002 Telugu film directed by Jayanth C. Paranjee

- Theatrical release poster
- Directed by: Jayanth C. Paranjee
- Written by: Paruchuri Brothers (dialogues)
- Screenplay by: Jayanth C. Paranjee
- Story by: Deena Raj
- Produced by: Kolla Ashok Kumar
- Starring: Prabhas; Sridevi Vijaykumar
- Cinematography: Jawahar Reddy
- Edited by: Marthand K. Venkatesh
- Music by: R. P. Patnaik
- Production company: Sri Lakshmi Venkateswara Art Creations
- Release date: 11 November 2002
- Running time: 164 minutes
- Country: India
- Language: Telugu

Eeswar is a 2002 Indian Telugu-language action drama film directed by Jayanth C. Paranjee, starring debutant Prabhas and Sridevi Vijaykumar. Siva Krishna and Revathi played supporting roles. It marked the debut of Prabhas, nephew of popular Telugu actor Krishnam Raju. Despite opening to mixed reviews from critics and general audiences, it emerged as an average grosser at the box office. It was re-released in 4K on June 13, 2026.

== Cast ==
- Prabhas as Eeswar
- Sridevi Vijaykumar as Indu
- Dheeraj Krishna Nori as Desi Dheeraj
- Revathi as Eeswar's stepmother
- Ravikanth
- Hanumanthu
- N. Hari Krishna
- Siva Krishna as Eeshwar's father
- Kolla Ashok Kumar as Indu's father
- Abhinaya Krishna as Eeswar's friend
- Brahmanandam as Priest
- Allari Subhashini
- Pavala Syamala
- C Kalyan as Police Officer
- Krishna as GK
- Rambabu

== Production ==
The film marked the debut of Prabhas and lead debut of Sridevi Vijayakumar, who previously worked as a child actress. This is the fastest film that Jayanth C. Paranjee made and the production was completed in 45 days. Hanumanthu, N. Hari Krishna, and Rambabu were cast in the film after Paranjee met them at a cultural festival.

== Soundtrack ==
Eeswar

Soundtrack album by R. P. Patnaik
- Released: 2002
- Genre: Soundtrack
- Length: 27:58
- Language: Telugu
- Label: Aditya Music
- Producer: R. P. Patnaik

The music was composed by R. P. Patnaik. All songs were written by Sirivennela Seetharama Sastry. Music was released by Aditya Music company. In an audio review, Sreya Sunil of Idlebrain.com, wrote "While most of the tunes can be termed as above average, some songs stand out mainly because of Sirivennela's lyrics that convey a lot of emotions in simple words".

No.	Title	Singer(s)	Length
1.	"Ameerpet"	R. P. Patnaik	4:30
2.	"Olammo Olammo"	R. P. Patnaik, Usha	3:47
3.	"Gundelo Valava"	Rajesh, Usha	4:57
4.	"Dhindhirana"	Rajesh, Usha	4:30
5.	"Innallu"	Rajesh, Usha	4:14
6.	"Kotaloni Rani"	Usha, Rajesh, Nihal, Lenina, Kousalya	4:21
7.	"Thillana (Theme Music)"	R. P. Patnaik	1:39
Total length:			27:58

== Reception ==
A critic from Idlebrain.com said that "Over all, it's an average flick and worth watching for all curious people to see how Prabhas fared". A critic from Sify opined that "On the whole Takkari Donga director Jayant C Paranji’s new film Eeswar is lacklustre". Gudipoodi Srihari of The Hindu wrote, "A little more care in streamlining the climax part of the story would have made the drama look sensible and different. The film has been unnecessarily stretched too far and beyond the three-hour limit too".

== Box office ==
The 100 day celebration for the film was held in Guntur.
