= Munna (2007 film) =

2007 Indian film by Vamshi Paidipally

- Directed by: Vamshi Paidipally
- Written by: Dialogues: Ravi-Siva
- Screenplay by: Vamshi Paidipally
- Story by: Vamshi Paidipally
- Produced by: Dil Raju
- Starring: Prabhas; Ileana D'Cruz; Prakash Raj; Kota Srinivasa Rao; Rahul Dev
- Cinematography: C. Ramprasad
- Edited by: Marthand K. Venkatesh
- Music by: Harris Jayaraj
- Production company: Sri Venkateswara Creations
- Distributed by: Sri Venkateswara Creations
- Release date: 1 May 2007
- Running time: 174 minutes
- Country: India
- Language: Telugu

Munna is a 2007 Indian Telugu-language action drama film directed by Vamshi Paidipally in his directorial debut and produced by Dil Raju. The film stars Prabhas as the titular character alongside Ileana D'Cruz in lead roles, while Prakash Raj, Kota Srinivasa Rao and Rahul Dev appear the supporting roles.

Munna was released on 1 May 2007 to mixed reviews and was a commercial failure, collecting a distributor's share of around ₹9.7 crore at the box office. It was re-released on March 6, 2026 to a warmer reception.

== Plot ==
Mahesh Kumar alias "Munna" is a college student whose aim is to finish Kamalakar alias Khakha, a crime boss who keeps the entire city under his grip. It is revealed that Khakha is actually Munna's estranged father, who was responsible for the deaths of his mother and Munna's young sister. Kakha's opposition Aatma asks Munna to join him, but he refuses his proposal. A mind game ensues, with Khakha's second wife, son Rahul, and daughter Shruthi leaving him and joining Munna. After many incidents, including his best friend's death, Munna finds out that Aatma was working for Khakha. Aatma and Khakha plan to kill Munna at a factory, but Aatma turns against Khakha, and Munna turns against them in turn. Khakha kills Aatma for his betrayal and commits suicide after losing everything that he worked for his life. With his vengeance completed, Munna leaves the factory. Munna later stands with his allies to fight injustice.

== Cast ==
- Prabhas as Mahesh Kumar alias Munna
  - Manoj Nandam as a young Munna
- Ileana D'Cruz as Nidhi Chowdary
- Prakash Raj as Kamalakar alias Khakha
- Kota Srinivasa Rao as Srinivasa Rao
- Rahul Dev as Aatma
- Kalyani as Munna's mother
- Sukanya as Kaka's second wife and Munna's stepmother
- Surya as Dr. Niranjan Chowdary, Nidhi's father
- Sudha as Nidhi's mother
- Tanikella Bharani as Qasim
- Posani Krishna Murali as Kishan
- Brahmaji as Purushottam
- Venu Yeldandi as Tillu
- Sridhar Rao as Rahul, Munna's stepbrother
- Venu Madhav as 'Spoon' Mohan
- Chalapathi Rao as Home Minister M. Sudhakar
- Raghu Babu as Satti Pandu
- Sameer Hasan as an Inspector
- Gundu Sudharshan as a priest
- Uttej as Gun Seller
- Sandra as Nidhi's friend
- Sridhar as Prakash
- Prabhas Sreenu as Prakash's henchman
- Fish Venkat as Kaka's henchman
- Medha Bahri as Shruti, Munna's stepsister
- Sanjay Vellanki as Munna's friend

=== Cameo appearance ===
- Vamshi Paidipally as passerby to 'Spoon' Mohan
- Shriya Saran in the song "Chammakkuro"

== Music ==
The film had six songs composed by Harris Jayaraj. The Audio was launched on 23 March 2007 in the presence of guests like Krishnam Raju, Allu Arjun, Sukumar and Bhaskar. Bhaskar released the audio cassette and presented the first unit to Sukumar, Allu Arjun presented the first audio CD to Prabhas. Soundtrack version of 'Manasa' featured the vocals of Sadhana Sargam while the film version retained vocals provided by Mahalakshmi Iyer. Harris Jayaraj received a nomination for Filmfare Best Music Director for his work in the film. Sadhana Sargam won the Filmfare Award for Best Female Playback Singer – Telugu for the song "Manasa".

The song "Baga Baga" is based on "Karu Karu Vizhigalal", which itself is based on Westlife’s "Hit You With The Real Thing". The song "Konchem Konchem" is based on "Uyyaalalo Uyyaalalo" from the delayed film Dhaam Dhoom.

Munna

Soundtrack album by Harris Jayaraj
- Released: 23 March 2007
- Recorded: 2007
- Genre: Feature film soundtrack
- Length: 30:20
- Language: Telugu
- Labels: Supreme Music; Aditya Music
- Producer: Harris Jayaraj

Harris Jayaraj chronology
Unnale Unnale (2007)	Munna (2007)	Bheemaa (2008)

Telugu track listing
No.	Title	Lyrics	Singer(s)	Length
1.	"Kadhulu Kadhulu"	Viswa	KK, Karthik (Chorus)	5:07
2.	"Manasa"	Kandikonda	Sadhana Sargam, Naresh Iyer, Krish, Haricharan, Mahalakshmi Iyer (Chorus & Humming)	5:51
3.	"Vasthaavaa Vasthaavaa"	Ananta Sriram	KK, Pop Shalini	5:40
4.	"Baga Baga (Power of Munna)"	Kandikonda	Shankar Mahadevan & Chorus	4:01
5.	"Chammakkuro"	Viswa	Karthik, Anushka Manchanda, Blaaze (Chorus) & Chinmayi (Humming)	5:00
6.	"Konchem Konchem"	Bhaskarabhatla Ravi Kumar	Kailash Kher, Sujatha Mohan	4:41
7.	"Manasa (Mahalakshmi Iyer Version - Unreleased/Theatrical Version)"	Kandikonda	Mahalakshmi Iyer, Naresh Iyer, Krish, Haricharan,	5:51
Total length:				30:20

Vetri Thirumagan

Soundtrack album by Harris Jayaraj
- Released: 2008
- Recorded: 2007
- Genre: Feature film soundtrack
- Length: 29:17
- Language: Tamil
- Label: New Music
- Producer: Harris Jayaraj

Tamil track listing
No.	Title	Lyrics	Singer(s)	Length
1.	"Amsa Vennila"	Muthu Vijayan	V.V. Prassanna, Vinaiya	4:52
2.	"Purappadu Nanba"	Sarathi	Sathyan	4:02
3.	"Puyalukkum Neruppukkum"	M.G. Kanniyappan	Sathyan	5:07
4.	"Thimirai Oru Pillai"	Sarathi	Padmalatha, V.V. Prassanna	5:06
5.	"Adi Vaama En Mayile"	M. Arul	Pushpavanam Kuppusamy, Hemambika	4:38
6.	"Variya Variya"	Muthu Vijayan	Yugendran, Vinaya	5:32
Total length:				29:17

== Release ==
The film was released on 26 April 2007. The film was also dubbed and released in Tamil as Vetri Thirumagan, in Hindi as Bagawat Ek Jung, in Malayalam with the same name.

== Critical reception ==
Idlebrain gave 3/5 stars and praised Prabhas' performances, stylized direction and budget, but criticized its narration and wrote "There is no holistic perspective in the film. Let us wait and see if Dil Raju's 'Midas Touch' works for this film or not!."

== Remakes ==
The film was also remade into Bangladesh Bengali as Amar Challenge starring Shakib Khan, Sahara, Misha Sawdagor and Shiba Shanu.

== Awards ==
- Sadhana Sargam won the Filmfare Award for Best Female Playback Singer – Telugu for the song "Manasa".
- Nandi Award for Best Cinematographer - Ram Prasad
