= Prabhas =

Indian actor (born 1979)

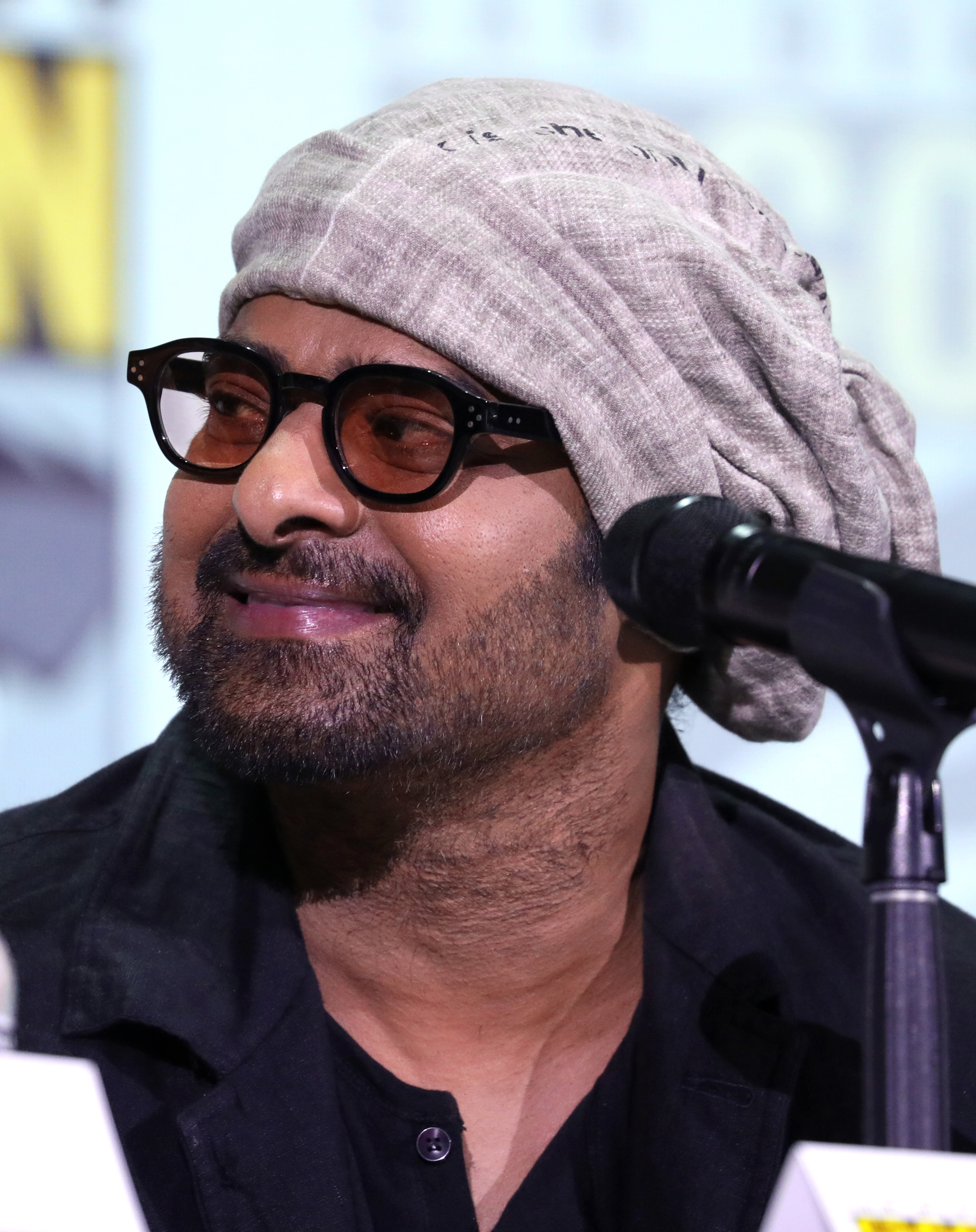
- Prabhas in 2023
- Born: Uppalapati Venkata Suryanarayana Prabhas Raju; 23 October 1979 (age 47); Madras (now Chennai), Tamil Nadu, India
- Other names: Rebel Star, Darling
- Education: Sri Chaitanya College, Hyderabad (BTech)
- Occupation: Actor
- Years active: 2002–present
- Works: Full list
- Father: Uppalapati Surya Narayana Raju
- Relatives: Krishnam Raju (uncle)

Uppalapati Venkata Suryanarayana Prabhas Raju (born 23 October 1979), known mononymously as Prabhas (pronounced [pɾabʱaːs]), is an Indian actor who predominantly works in Telugu cinema. He is one of the highest-paid actors in Indian cinema and has been featured in Forbes India's Celebrity 100 list since 2015. Referred to in the media as Rebel Star, he has appeared in over 24 films, and has received seven Filmfare Awards nominations, a Nandi Award, and a SIIMA Award.

Prabhas made his acting debut with the drama Eeswar (2002) and later attained his breakthrough with the action romance Varsham (2004). He went on to act in other commercially successful films such as Chatrapathi (2005), Bujjigadu (2008), Billa (2009), Darling (2010), Mr. Perfect (2011), and Mirchi (2013), winning the Nandi Award for Best Actor for his performance in the lattermost.

Prabhas then starred in a dual role in the blockbuster epic action duology Baahubali: The Beginning (2015) and its sequel Baahubali 2: The Conclusion (2017), with the latter emerging as the highest-grossing Indian film of all time at that point. Prabhas became the first pan-Indian star and earned international recognition for his performance in the films. He has since starred in the action thriller Saaho (2019), the action drama Salaar: Part 1 – Ceasefire (2023), and the science fiction film Kalki 2898 AD (2024), all of which rank among the highest-grossing Indian films.

Prabhas is the first Indian actor to have a film gross over ₹1000 crore worldwide. He is the only Indian actor to have six films with a worldwide gross opening of over ₹100 crore. He is also the only South Indian actor with six films that have crossed the ₹100 crore net mark in the Hindi market. Additionally, he is the first South Indian actor to receive a wax sculpture at a Madame Tussauds' museum.

== Early life and education ==
Prabhas was born on 23 October 1979 in a Telugu family to film producer Uppalapati Surya Narayana Raju and Siva Kumari in Madras (now Chennai) as Uppalapati Venkata Suryanarayana Prabhas Raju . The youngest of three children, he has an elder brother, Prabodh, and elder sister, Pragathi. He is the nephew of Telugu film actor Krishnam Raju. His family hails from Mogalthur, near Bhimavaram of West Godavari district, Andhra Pradesh.

Prabhas did his schooling at Don Bosco Matriculation Higher Secondary School, Chennai, and at DNR High School, Bhimavaram. He then completed his intermediate education from Nalanda College, Hyderabad. He later went on to pursue Bachelor of Technology (B.Tech) from Sri Chaitanya College, Hyderabad. He is also an alumnus of Satyanand Film Institute, Visakhapatnam.

== Career ==
=== 2002–2014: Early work and career progression ===
Prabhas made his debut with the 2002 action drama Eeswar. In 2003, he followed up with Raghavendra, which received mixed reviews while Idlebrain stated that Prabhas is so good in this film that you can watch it only for him, he is the superstar in making, and all he needs is the right director and right break. He attained his breakthrough with the action romance Varsham (2004), which went on to be a blockbuster and one of the highest grossing Telugu films of the year. He received his first nomination for the Filmfare Award for Best Actor – Telugu. He appeared in Adavi Raamudu (2004), the same year which received mostly negative reception from the critics and audience alike. In 2005, he appeared in Chakram, which received mixed reviews and went on to win two Nandi Awards. Prabhas portrayed the role of a refugee, exploited by goons, in S. S. Rajamouli's action drama Chatrapathi, the same year. It emerged as a blockbuster and had a 100-day run in 54 centers. Idlebrain.com stated that "he had a unique style and macho charm in his screen presence". Chatrapathi earned him his second nomination for the Filmfare Award for Best Actor – Telugu. In 2006, Prabhas starred in the musical drama Pournami, which garnered mixed critical reception but earned praise for the cast's performances. In 2007, he starred in action drama Yogi and Munna, both of which received lukewarm response from both audience and fans alike. In 2008, Prabhas collaborated with the director Puri Jagannadh for action-comedy Bujjigadu which gave him a much needed box-office comeback and he received critical acclaim for his performance. In 2009, Prabhas played a dual role in the action thriller Billa (2009), which went on to be a blockbuster at box-office. Later that year, he starred in Ek Niranjan (2009), which opened to mixed reviews, and earned him his third nomination for the Filmfare Award for Best Actor – Telugu.

In 2010, he appeared in the romantic comedy Darling which received positive reviews from audiences and critics. It went on to be one of the highest grossers of the year and critics lauded Prabhas's performance, as the major highlight of the film. The Times of India noted the film to be derivative and that the director hasn't really come out of his previous work Tholi Prema. In 2011, Prabhas starred in romantic drama Mr. Perfect, which received positive reviews and went on to be a blockbuster. His performance in the film earned him his fourth nomination for the Filmfare Award for Best Actor – Telugu. The Statesman described the film as a "timeless classic". The review site GreatAndhra rated the film with three stars and noted "The film comes across as a clean, family entertainer and the intention of the makers must be appreciated. In 2024, the film was re-released in Japan, garnering unanimous positive responses from the fans and the audiences alike, with every show selling out.

In 2012, Prabhas starred in the action Rebel, received mixed reviews from critics and underperformed at the box office. It was praised for cast performances, action sequences, and production values, but criticised for its plot and screenplay. The Times of India and NDTV stated that, the film serves up fare for the mass audience, and hard-core Prabhas fans. He also rendered his voice for a short duration in the film Denikaina Ready (2012). In 2013, Prabhas starred in Mirchi, which opened to positive reviews and went on to be a blockbuster. It was one of the highest grossing Telugu films of the year as well as one of the highest-grossing Telugu films of all time, at the time of its release. His performance in the film earned him his fifth nomination for the Filmfare Award for Best Actor – Telugu. NDTV gave the film a mixed review, stating that "apart from good direction and strong performance by the lead actor, Mirchi lacks narrative power and is loosely based on an amalgamation of some old films". Idlebrain stated that "Mirchi is a film that is made to do a commercial hit. Prabhas entertains with Mirchi and director does a decent work. On a whole, Mirchi has all the ingredients of a commercial potboiler". He then made his Hindi cinema debut in 2014 in the special dance number "Punjabi Mast" from the film Action Jackson.

=== 2015–2017: The Baahubali pivot and pan-India success ===
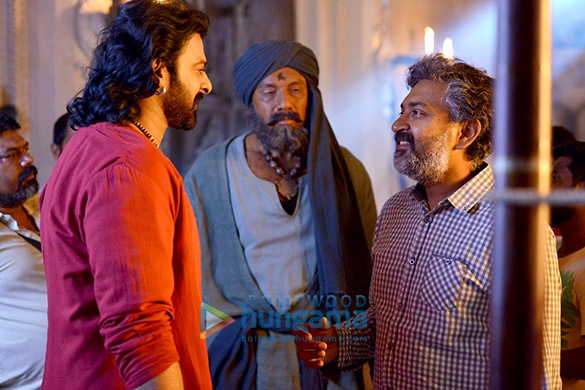
Prabhas on the sets of Baahubali 2: The Conclusion

In 2015, Prabhas played a dual role as Shivudu/Mahendra Baahubali and Amarendra Baahubali in S.S. Rajamouli's epic action drama Baahubali: The Beginning (2015). With a budget of ₹180 crore ($28 million), it was the most expensive Indian film ever made at the time of release, and became a record-breaking box office success. The film eventually grossed over ₹600 crore (US$62 million) worldwide, making it the highest-grossing Telugu film and the second highest-grossing Indian film at that point. It is one of the highest-grossing Indian film to date. It received national and international acclaim, and started a new film movement called Pan-Indian films.

Prabhas reprised his role in its sequel, Baahubali 2: The Conclusion (2017), with a budget of ₹250 crore ($36.87 million), it was the most expensive Indian film ever produced at the time of release. It became the first Indian film ever to gross over ₹1,000 crore (US$120 million) worldwide, first Indian film to gross ₹100 crore (US$10 million) and ₹200 crore (US$21 million) on its opening day, and highest-grossing Indian film at that point. The film eventually grossed over ₹1,810 crore (US$190 million) worldwide, making it second-highest-grossing Indian film worldwide to date and the highest-grossing film in India till date.

Prabhas dedicated 5 years for the duology, stating that the project demanded a certain level of dedication and refrained from signing any other project over the tenure. This dedication was a subject of media commentary; in a 2017 interview, Prabhas stated, "For Rajamouli, I would have even spent more than four years on Baahubali. I would have been ready to dedicate even seven years for him on the project". He underwent rigorous training to prepare for his dual role in the film. For the character of Shivudu, he reduced his weight to a lean 86-88 kilograms with a minimal body fat percentage of 5-6%. Conversely, for the role of Baahubali, he significantly had to increase his weight to a bulky 105 kilograms with a body fat composition of 8-10%. He won the SIIMA Award for Best Actor – Telugu for his performance in The Conclusion. His performance in both film earned him his sixth and seventh nominations for the Filmfare Award for Best Actor – Telugu. The success of Baahubali series propelled Prabhas to become the first "Pan-Indian" star in Indian cinema, receiving significant following across India.

Baahubali: The Beginning (2015) concluded on a famous cliffhanger—"Why Kattappa killed Baahubali? (WKKB)"—which became a national marketing and pop culture phenomenon that sustained audience interest for the two years leading up to the sequel. Baahubali 2: The Conclusion (2017) received widespread critical acclaim upon its release. International critics offered significant praise. The Guardian described it as a "jaw-dropping blockbuster that combines nimble action with genuine heart" and "thunderous spectacle". RogerEbert.com called it "everything I want but rarely get from superhero and big-budget fantasy movies," adding that it "never once felt like a soul-less, committee-assembled piece of entertainment". His dual role as Amarendra Baahubali and Mahendra Baahubali in the franchise was the primary catalyst for his transition from a regional star to a pan-Indian celebrity.

=== 2017–2023: Post-Baahubali and setbacks ===
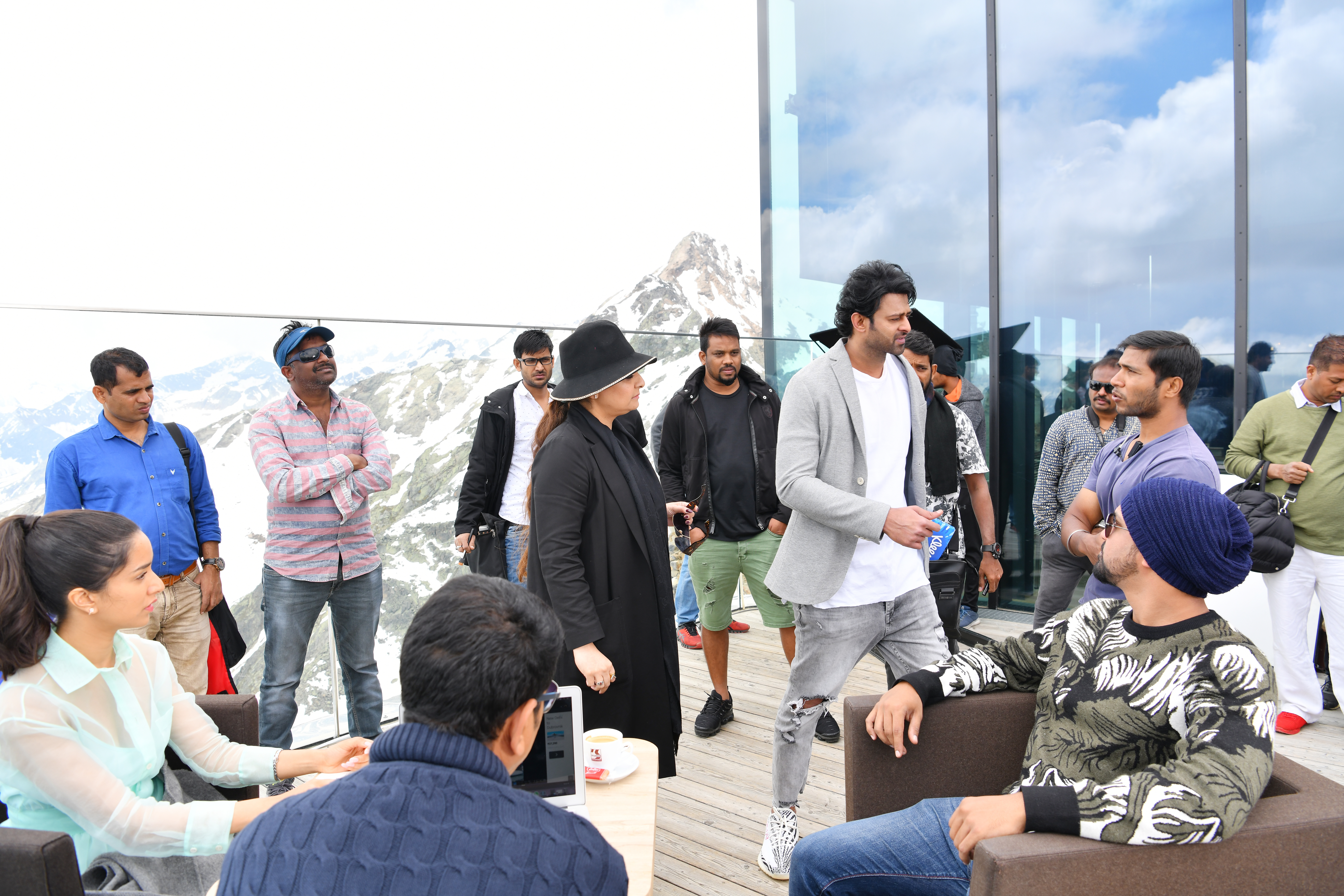
Prabhas on the sets of Saaho

The unprecedented financial success of the Baahubali series created immense audience expectations and commercial pressure for Prabhas's subsequent projects. This cemented a career strategy focused exclusively on high-budget, multilingual "event films" designed to appeal to a pan-Indian audience, rather than films targeted solely at the Telugu market.

In 2019, Prabhas starred in Sujeeth's action thriller Saaho. Saaho opened to mixed reviews and grossed ₹130 crore worldwide on its opening day, making it Prabhas's second ₹100 crore opening day grosser. The film eventually grossed over ₹419 crore (US$44 million) at the box-office. The Telugu version of the film underperformed, while the Hindi version was a hit. In an interview promoting Saaho, Prabhas noted that this pan-India approach expands the market, which in turn is necessary to justify the larger budgets required for such large-scale productions. This "stardom economy" model, where his star power is used to finance massive-scale productions, became the defining feature of his post-2017 career.

In 2022, Prabhas appeared in the period romance drama Radhe Shyam which received poor reviews from critics and proved to be a box office bomb. The film was released to predominantly negative reviews. Critics cited a "slow pace," "weak songs," and a "thin love line". A review from Film Companion noted "lazy writing" that "undermines the grandiose visuals" and specifically pointed out that Prabhas's "dialogue delivery in Hindi is clumsy". This failure demonstrated the limits of Prabhas's pan-India brand. While audiences in the Hindi belt had accepted him in the action genre (Saaho), this high-budget romantic drama failed to find an audience, suggesting his post-Baahubali stardom was strongly tied to the action-spectacle genre. Prabhas later reflected on the failure, stating, "Maybe Covid or maybe we missed something in script".

In 2023, Prabhas portrayed Raghava (Lord Ram) in the epic mythological action film Adipurush, an adaptation of Hindu epic the Ramayana. It received highly negative response from critics as well as the audience, who criticised the film's screenplay and visuals, and turned out to be another box-office bomb for the actor. Adipurush had a strong opening weekend, largely fuelled by extensive advance bookings and Prabhas's mass appeal and return to a mythological character. However, following the overwhelmingly negative public response, the film "had a sharp decline in collections" by its first Monday. It was ultimately declared a major "box office bomb".

==== Critique of Post-Baahubali Career ====
Critics and industry analysts have extensively discussed the immense commercial pressure associated with Prabhas's pan-India stardom. There is a recurring critique of his script selection following Baahubali, with sources observing that Saaho, Radhe Shyam, and Adipurush were all "met with negative reception". Some analyses have focused on his unique box office power, noting his ability to command massive openings "despite the movie results & genres" and cementing him as 'India's most bankable star'. This highlights the "stardom economy" he represents, where his bankability for an opening weekend is the primary asset justifying enormous production budgets.

=== 2023–present: Resurgence ===
Prabhas went on to star in Prashanth Neel's action drama Salaar: Part 1 – Ceasefire (2023), the same year. This film marked a strategic return to the high-octane, mass-action genre. It was Prabhas's first collaboration with Prashanth Neel, the director of the commercially successful KGF franchise. The film was produced with a budget estimated between ₹270–400 crore. The film opened to positive reviews and grossed ₹176 crore worldwide on its opening day. It eventually grossed over ₹705 crore (equivalent to ₹769 crore or US$80 million in 2026) worldwide. The film was a major "commercial success"., and proved to be a comeback film for him. While some reviewers found the plot "confusing" and criticised its "relentless blood splurting violence" and "ultra loud bgm", it was generally seen as a successful return to form for Prabhas in the action genre, with praise for his screen presence.

In 2024, he starred in Nag Ashwin's epic science fiction film Kalki 2898 AD. Made on a ₹600 crore (US$62 million) production budget, it is the most expensive Indian film. Kalki 2898 AD grossed over ₹191 crore worldwide on its opening day, which was the third highest first day gross for an Indian film, and making it the fifth and third consecutive ₹100 crore opener worldwide for Prabhas, a feat unheard of in Indian cinema. Rahul Malhotra of Collider quotes that Kalki 2898 AD's resounding opening cements "Prabhas as one of the biggest Indian movie stars of his generation". The film grossed over ₹1,100 crore (US$110 million) at the box-office, making it the second ₹1,000 crore (US$120 million) film for Prabhas. It set multiple box office records, became the second highest-grossing Indian film of 2024, and was the fourth highest-grossing Telugu film. The film received generally positive reviews from Indian and international critics. The Guardian praised its "maximalism" and "brassy looking" world-building. Critics lauded the film's ambition, visual effects, and the performances of its ensemble cast, though some noted flaws in the screenplay. It combined the massive scale of his previous ventures with genuine narrative ambition, originality, and critical praise, suggesting a more sustainable model for his stardom moving forward: one based on massive scale plus ambitious storytelling.

In 2025, he appeared in an extended cameo role as Rudra in the film Kannappa (2025), directed by Mukesh Kumar Singh. On 31 October 2025, to commemorate the franchise's anniversary, a special theatrical compilation titled Baahubali: The Epic was released. This edition merged Baahubali: The Beginning and Baahubali 2: The Conclusion into a single feature film, enhanced by digitally remastered visuals, upgraded sound design and score, and previously unreleased footage. The merged theatrical re-release of the Baahubali franchise set the record for the highest opening day collections for a re-released film in India.

In January 2026, Prabhas starred in the horror-comedy fantasy film The RajaSaab, directed by Maruthi. Released on 9 January 2026 to coincide with the Sankranti festival, the film featured an ensemble cast including Malavika Mohanan, Nidhhi Agerwal, Riddhi Kumar, Boman Irani, and Sanjay Dutt. Positioned as a "light-hearted festive entertainer," it marked a departure from his recent heavy-action roles, returning him to the romance and comedy genres. The film received mixed-to-negative reception from the critics and audiences, emerging as a massive box office bomb.

=== Upcoming projects ===
As of March 2026, Prabhas has several films in various stages of overlapping production. He is in the advanced stages of filming Fauzi (working title), a war-themed action drama directed by Hanu Raghavapudi. Set in 1940s British colonial India, the period drama features Prabhas as a rebellious soldier alongside an ensemble cast including Imanvi, Mithun Chakraborty, Jaya Prada, and Anupam Kher. Originally conceived as a single feature, the project has been expanded into a two-part saga. With the dialogue-centric portions largely wrapped, production is currently focused on completing major action sequences, targeting a theatrical release around the Dussehra festival in 2026. Simultaneously, Prabhas is starring in the action-thriller Spirit, marking his first collaboration with director Sandeep Reddy Vanga. Principal photography began in late November 2025; following the completion of the first shooting schedule, Prabhas is slated to resume filming his remaining blocks in May 2026. The film features Prabhas as a fierce police officer combating an international crime syndicate, with Triptii Dimri, Vivek Oberoi, Prakash Raj, and Aishwarya Desai co-starring. The film will release on 5 March 2027.

Prabhas is also set to reprise his dual roles of Bhairava and Karna in the epic dystopian sci-fi sequel Kalki 2898 AD - Part 2. Moving ahead of its initial mid-2026 schedule, principal photography for the sequel officially commenced in February 2026 with co-stars Amitabh Bachchan and Kamal Haasan, with Prabhas expected to join the sets for brief shooting blocks to accommodate his dense schedule.

Further, he will appear in Salaar: Part 2 – Shouryaanga Parvam, reuniting with director Prashanth Neel and co-star Prithviraj Sukumaran. Expanding on the dystopian action saga, the sequel focuses on the complex relationship between the protagonists Deva (Prabhas) and Varadha (Prithviraj) as they battle for the throne of Khansaar. Early production resumed in March 2026, with Prabhas allocating short, 10-day filming blocks to advance the shoot, though the final release timeline remains fluid.

Additionally, Prabhas has entered into a three-film contract with Hombale Films, the production company behind notable successes such as KGF, Kantara, and Salaar. The partnership will commence with Salaar: Part 2 – Shouryaanga Parvam, with two subsequent untitled films tentatively scheduled for release in 2027 and 2028.

== Philanthropy and public initiatives ==
Prabhas has been vocal of the Swachh Bharat Mission (SBM) and featured in promotional campaigns such as Prime Minister Narendra Modi's 'Swachhata Hi Seva' mission. In 2020, Prabhas donated ₹4 crore (US$420,000) for the cause of combating against the COVID-19 pandemic. Of this, ₹3 crore was given to the Prime Minister's National Relief Fund, while ₹50 lakh each went to the Chief Minister Relief Funds of Andhra Pradesh and Telangana. He adopted 1,650 acres of Khazipally Reserve Forest near Hyderabad and donated ₹2 crore (US$210,000) for the development of the eco-park in the name of his late father Uppalapati Surya Narayana Raju, in 2020. He also donated a total of ₹8 lakh (equivalent to ₹8.7 lakh or US$9,100 in 2026) to the Lions Club of Hyderabad Sadhuram Eye Hospital.

In 2021, he donated ₹1 crore (equivalent to ₹1.1 crore or US$110,000 in 2026) to the Andhra Pradesh Chief Minister's Relief Fund (CMRF) to help all those who have been affected due to the heavy rainfall in several parts of the state. In 2023, he donated a sum of ₹10 lakh (equivalent to ₹11 lakh or US$11,000 in 2026) for the development of Sri Seetha Ramachandra Swamy Devathanam at Bhadrachalam. In 2024, he donated a sum of ₹35 lakh (equivalent to ₹38 lakh or US$40,000 in 2026) to the Telugu Film Directors Association (TFDA) to support the welfare of the cinema worker's body. Prabhas donated a sum of ₹2 crore (US$210,000) to the Kerala Chief Minister's Relief Fund, to help the victims of the 2024 Wayanad landslides. Prabhas donated a sum of ₹2 crore (US$210,000) to aid flood relief efforts in Andhra Pradesh and Telangana, with ₹1 crore (US$120,000) each allocated to the Chief Minister Relief Funds of both states.

== Media image and public perception ==
=== The "Pan-India Star" label ===
Prabhas is the first Indian actor ever to be referred to as a "Pan-India" star. Film journalists and analysts, such as Baradwaj Rangan and Vishal Menon, have labelled him as the first of the kind in Indian cinema. Prabhas is considered as "a flagbearer of introducing the trend of Pan-India films in the nation". He is also popularly referred to in the media and by audiences as the "Rebel Star". Moreover, he is widely known for affectionately referring to his fans and close associates as "Darlings". Media reports trace the origin of this nickname to his 2010 film Darling and his personal habit of addressing directors and co-stars by that term, which was subsequently adopted by his extensive fanbase as a term of endearment for him. His stardom is defined by an appeal that is seen to "transcend regional boundaries" and a "language-neutral appeal", which allows him to command a substantial fanbase across India's diverse linguistic markets, "from Hyderabad to Haryana". During the official announcement of his upcoming directorial venture Spirit, filmmaker Sandeep Reddy Vanga characterised Prabhas as "India's Biggest Superstar". The statement subsequently generated significant discourse across social media platforms and within popular culture media regarding the actor's standing in the Indian film industry. In 2020, Prabhas received the "Russian Audience Heart" award, a distinction previously held by Indian actor Raj Kapoor.

In academic and critical circles, Prabhas's post-2015 career is a primary case study for a major shift in the Indian film industry. Scholarly publications have identified the release of Baahubali: The Beginning as heralding a "new chapter in the Pan-Indian cinematic narrative". This trend has been termed the "Baahubalisation Effect". Academic analyses identify Prabhas as the central figure in this shift, documenting his transformation from a prominent Telugu actor into a "pan-Indian star". His career serves as a model for this new form of "financial collaboration across India, where actors are drawn from different language industries". Some analyses have focused on his unique box office power, noting his ability to command massive openings "despite the movie results & genres". This highlights the "stardom economy" he represents, where his bankability for an opening weekend is the primary asset justifying enormous production budgets. As a result, he has headlined six of the twenty-six most expensive films in Indian cinema history, with producers leveraging his "pan-Indian" appeal to mitigate the financial risks associated with such massive production budgets, including The RajaSaab, Kalki 2898 AD, Adipurush, Salaar: Part 1 – Ceasefire, Saaho, and Baahubali film series.

=== "Reclusive Star" persona ===
A recurring and defining narrative in media coverage is the paradox of his public persona. While being one of India's biggest and highest-paid stars, he is simultaneously described by media as "reclusive," "shy," "grounded," and "low-key" off-screen. Prabhas has confirmed this in interviews. In a 2019 interview with IANS, he stated, "I am still shy when I go to interviews. I want a lot of people to come and watch my film but I can't face (that many) people". He added, "After being in the industry for 13-14 years now, I still don't know how to handle stardom. My fans feel bad that their hero doesn't come out so much. I'm better than before, and trying to improve". Prabhas's rare interviews reveal self-awareness of his persona, often laced with humour. In a 2019 Deccan Chronicle chat, he stated: "I am not Baahubali in real life. I am more of a family person... I am socially awkward and that’s why I was not on Twitter; I can’t handle it. I am a shy person and my directors also know that I am not a great talker." He shared an anecdote from a Radhe Shyam (2022) shoot with Pooja Hegde: after a roadside hug scene in Hyderabad, the director chided, "You are not holding her properly. The romantic scene seems cold," attributing it to his shyness around women, he admitted never striking up conversations with them early on and finding road romances harder than studio ones. A 2017 Times of India report from a pre-Saaho event painted him as "the reclusive actor" who "prefers to keep to himself," dodging marriage queries with "I am too young to marry" at 37, eliciting laughs but highlighting his aversion to personal probes. More recently, a January 2025 IMDb feature delved into career doubts: "Why am I in this field?" he pondered due to introversion, with close ones calling him "very lazy" personally while praising his professional diligence.

Prabhas was ranked second in Times' Most Desirable Men for the year 2017, and twelfth in 2018. He was then added to the Forever Desirable list of Hyderabad Times in 2019. He was the most searched actor on Google in Karnataka, for the year 2019. He is the only actor from South Indian cinema to feature in the magazine Eastern Eye's 2019 listing of the 10 Sexiest Asian Men. He was also featured in the GQ in their listing of the most influential young Indians of 2017. As of August 2024, he is one of the most-followed Telugu actors on Instagram.

Prabhas, generally does not endorse brands or appear in advertisements. However, in 2015, he was signed on by Mahindra & Mahindra as brand ambassador for the new Mahindra TUV300 car, making his debut in the television commercial arena. News 18 reported that he rejected brand endorsements worth ₹150 crore (US$16 million) in 2020. This pattern was established just after the success of the Baahubali films; in 2017, it was reported he had declined offers worth ₹18 crore. Director S. S. Rajamouli also noted that Prabhas let go of an endorsement offer worth ₹10 crore while filming Baahubali 2 so he could remain focused on the film.

== Awards and nominations ==
Prabhas awards and nominations
Awards and nominations
Award	Wins	Nominations

Totals (Note: Certain award groups do not simply award one winner. They acknowledge several different recipients, have runners-up, and have third place. Since this is a specific recognition and is different from losing an award, runner-up mentions are considered wins in this award tally. For simplification and to avoid errors, each award in this list has been presumed to have had a prior nomination.)
- Wins: 6
- Nominations: 13

List of Prabhas awards and nominations
Year	Award	Category	Film	Result	Ref.
2004	Filmfare Awards South	Best Actor – Telugu	Varsham	Nominated	
2004	Santosham Film Awards	Best Young Performer	Varsham	Won	
2005	Filmfare Awards South	Best Actor – Telugu	Chatrapathi	Nominated	
2010	CineMAA Awards	Best Actor (Critics)	Darling	Won	
2011	Filmfare Awards South	Best Actor – Telugu	Mr. Perfect	Nominated	
2011	South Indian International Movie Awards	Best Actor (Telugu)	Mr. Perfect	Nominated	
2013	Filmfare Awards South	Best Actor – Telugu	Mirchi	Nominated	
2013	Nandi Awards	Best Actor – Telugu	Mirchi	Won	
2013	South Indian International Movie Awards	Best Actor (Telugu)	Mirchi	Nominated	
2015	IIFA Utsavam	Best Actor – Telugu	Baahubali: The Beginning	Nominated	
2015	IIFA Utsavam	Best Actor – Tamil	Baahubali: The Beginning	Nominated	
2015	Filmfare Awards South	Best Actor – Telugu	Baahubali: The Beginning	Nominated	
2015	Santosham Film Awards	Best Actor	Baahubali: The Beginning	Won	
2015	South Indian International Movie Awards	Best Actor (Telugu)	Baahubali: The Beginning	Nominated	
2017	Filmfare Awards South	Best Actor – Telugu	Baahubali 2: The Conclusion	Nominated	
2017	South Indian International Movie Awards	Best Actor (Telugu)	Baahubali 2: The Conclusion	Won	
