= Lokesh Mittal =

Indian actor

- Born: 4 December 1976 (age 49); Delhi, India
- Occupation: Film actor
- Years active: 2010-present

Lokesh Mittal is an Indian actor who works in Hindi films. He is mainly known for his films like Sui Dhaaga, The Pickup Artist, The White Tiger, Runway 34, Dasvi and Farzi.

== Early life ==
Mittal was born in Delhi, India.

== Career ==
In 2010, Mittal started his career with the film Do Dooni Chaar. In 2016, he played as Mamaji in the TV series Baked. In 2017, he played as Majnu in Chef, as Lawyer Prajapati in Long Live Brij Mohan and as Builder in Dilliwood. In 2018, he acted as Panditji in Sui Dhaaga and as Vidhayak’PA in Ekkees Tareekh Shubh Muhurat. Apart from this, he bagged projects like Farzi, Bholaa, Runway 34, Dasvi, The White Tiger, Panchayat Season 4, Rasbhari and Sherni.

== Filmography ==
Year	Title	Role	Notes
2010	Do Dooni Chaar		Debut film
2016	The Workplace: Love Is War	writer	
2016	Baked	Mamaji	
2017	Chef	Majnu	
2017	Long Live Brij Mohan	Prajapati	
2017	Dilliwood	Builder	
2018	When Obama Loved Osama	Minister	
2018	Sui Dhaaga	Panditji	
2018	Chal Ja Bapu	Pooran	
2018	Ekkees Tareekh Shubh Muhurat	Vidhayak’PA	
2019	Rasbhari	Mohit Saxena	
2019	The Pickup Artist	Lalaram	
2019	School Diaries	Professor Pandey	
2020	Sector 12 Ka Kitty Club	Mr. Sharma	
2021	The Whiter Tiger	Sidekick	
2021	Sherni	DFO Mohan	
2021	Modern Pariwar	Sanjiv	
2022	Dasvi	Sherawat	
2022	Runway 34	Chubey	
2022	Khuda Haafiz Chapter 2 Agni Pariksha	SP Bhusan Giri	
2023	Farzi	Lakdawala	Web Series
2023	Bholaa	Deep Singh	
2025	Jaat	Government Officer	
2025	Dashavtar	Mansukhani	Marathi film
2025	Tu Meri Main Tera Main Tera Tu Meri	Mr. Bhatia	
