= National Postcode Lottery =

National Postcode Lottery may refer to:

- Nationale Postcode Loterij
- People's Postcode Lottery
- UK Postcode Lottery
- Postcode Lottery Group
