= Postcode lottery (disambiguation) =

Postcode lottery could refer to:

- Postcode lottery
- National Postcode Lottery, a lottery in The Netherlands
- People's Postcode Lottery, a lottery in Great Britain
- The Postcode Lottery group, a Dutch international social enterprise that establishes and manages charitable lotteries worldwide
