= The Pick-up Artist =

The Pick-up Artist may refer to:

- The Pick-up Artist (1987 film), an American film starring Molly Ringwald and Robert Downey Jr.
- The Pickup Artist (2019 film), an Indian film
- The Pickup Artist (TV series), a VH1 reality series

See also:

- Pickup artist
