= Vinay Shukla (documentary filmmaker) =

Indian filmmaker

Vinay Shukla Image =
- Occupations: Film Director, Film producer
- Years active: 2009-present
- Awards: The Peabody Award

Vinay Shukla is an Indian director, best known for his documentaries An Insignificant Man and While We Watched.

== Career ==
Vinay started his career as an assistant director for the 2009 movie Victory. His first short movie was titled Bureaucracy Sonata, set during the Emergency in India in 1975.

In 2012, Vinay started working on the idea of An Insignificant Man with Khushboo Ranka. The film premiered at the Toronto International Film Festival in 2016 followed by a theatrical release in India in November 2017.

In 2022, Vinay released While We Watched, profiling NDTV's Ravish Kumar's journalistic independence against the backdrop of general media bias in India. The shooting itself took two years. The film won the Amplify voices award at the 2022 Toronto International Film Festival, Busan cinephile award at the 27th Busan International Film Festival and the Peabody award in 2023.

== Filmography ==
Year	Title	Director	Producer	Screenwriter	Ref.
2011	Bureaucracy Sonata	Yes			
2016	An Insignificant Man	Yes	Yes	Yes	
2022	While We Watched	Yes	Yes	Yes	
