= 27th Busan International Film Festival =

2022 edition of film festival

- BIFF official poster
- Opening film: Scent of the Wind by Seyed Hadi Mohaghegh
- Closing film: A Man by Kei Ishikawa
- Location: Busan Cinema Center
- Founded: 1995
- Awards: New Currents Award: A Wild Roomer by Lee Jeong-hong, South Korea; Shivamma by Jaishankar Aryar, India; Kim Jiseok Awards; Scent of Wind by Hadi Mohaghegh, Iran; Alterations by Yalkin Tuychiev, Uzbekistan; Korean Cinema Award; Goran Topalovic, United States; The Asian Filmmaker of the Year; Tony Leung Chiu-wai
- Hosted by: Supported by: Ministry of Culture, Sports and Tourism; Metropolitan City of Busan; Korean Film Council
- No. of films: 243 films from 71 countries
- Festival date: Opening: October 5, 2022; Closing: October 14, 2022
- Website: BIFF 2022

Busan International Film Festival
- 28th 26th

The 27th Busan International Film Festival (Korean: 제27회 부산국제영화제) was held from October 5 at the Busan Cinema Center in Busan, South Korea till October 14. This year, the festival restarted events and program sections which were not conducted due to COVID-19 for last 2 years. The festival opened with Iranian film Scent of the Wind by director Seyed Hadi Mohaghegh, Jeon Yeo-been with Ryu Jun-yeol were master of ceremonies for the opening ceremony.

In 27th edition 243 films from 71 countries were invited, in these films there were 89 world premieres, and 13 international premieres. 111 community service films were also part of 2022 festival.

This year BIFF opened special program, ‘The New Wave of Japanese Cinema’ dedicated to 10 notable next-generation Japanese directors. 10 Japanese-directed films selected by director Ryusuke Hamaguchi, Shozo Ichiyama, the executive director of the Tokyo International Film Festival, Teruoka Sozo, a programmer at the Osaka Asian Film Festival, and Toshiyuki Hasegawa, a programmer at the Skip City International D Cinema Film Festival, will be screened during the course of the festival. Another addition to special program was 'A New Perspective on Documentary in the 21st Century', which introduced 10 innovative documentaries. These films were fresh and unique works that are outside the traditional documentary framework. The third feature of 'Special Program in Focus' was screening of 6 films of Tony Leung, a Hong Kong actor and singer, who is also the winner of the 'Asian Filmmaker of the Year' award this year.

The festival visited by 160,000 people closed on October 14, with Japanese film One Man by director Kei Ishikawa. Han Sun-hwa with Kwon Yul hosted the closing ceremony of the festival.

== Events ==
- Actors' House: Contemporary actors representing Korea, having acting talents and star qualities, tell honest and in-depth stories about their acting and works.
- BIFF in the Neighborhood: BIFF in the Neighborhood is a program where the entire village of Busan is transformed into a venue for the film festival.
- Cinema Together: October 10 to 12 — Mentors and mentees program with 16 people including directors, actors, critics, and music directors acting as mentors.
- Everything About Avatar: The Way of Water:
- Unveiling of the remastered version of Nakdong River: The film Nakdong River (1952) by Jeon Chang-geun, produced during the Korean War will be digitally remastered and premiered at the festival.

== Jury ==
=== New Currents Award ===
- Serge Toubiana, a French journalist and film critic . He was director of the Cinémathèque française and president of Unifrance, (Chairman of jury)
- Alain Guiraudie, French film director and screenwriter
- Kamila Andini, an Indonesian film director
- Ryō Kase, a Japanese actor
- Lee Yoo-Jin, CEO of Film History and South Korean producer.

=== Kim Jiseok Award ===
- Jean-Michel Frodon, a French journalist, critic and historian of cinema.
- Naoko Ogigami, a Japanese film director, screenwriter, and cinematographer.
- Kim Hee-jung, director and winner of the 21st Busan International Film Festival APM Creative Content Agency Director's Award.

=== BIFF Mecenat Award ===
- Wang Bing, Chinese director, documentary film-maker. Chairman of the jury for the BIFF Mecenat Awards
- Mohammed Osama, Syrian director
- Kim Il-ran, South Korean director

=== Sonje Award ===
- Saeed Roustayi, Iranian director, screenwriter and producer
- Hayakawa Chie, Japanese director
- Yoon Ga-eun, South Korean film director and script writer

=== FIPRESCI Award ===
- Eija Niskanen, Finnish film critic and film event coordinator.
- WANG Hsin, a Taiwanese writer and cultural critic.
- AHN Chi-yong, South Korean film critic, A member of both the International Federation of Film Critics (FIPRESCI) and the Korean Association of Film Critics, Ahn writes film critiques at Le Monde diplomatique and OhmyNews.

=== NETPAC Award ===
- Gerwin Tamsma, Netherlands Film Critic
- Tsengel Davaasambuu, Mongolia Film Producer
- Kim Dong-hyun, Festival Director of Seoul Independent Film Festival

=== Actor of the Year Award ===
- Lee Young-ae, a South Korean actress
- Kim Sang-kyung, a South Korean actor

== Program sections ==
The festival has following sections:

- Gala Presentation
- Icons
- New Currents
- Kim Jiseok
- A Window on Asian Cinema
- Korean Cinema Today Vision Section
- World Cinema
- Flash Forward
- Wide Angle
- Open Cinema
- Midnight Passion
- On Screen
- Special Program in Focus
  - Discovering New Japanese Cinema
  - New Perspective of Documentary in the 21st Century

=== Opening and closing films ===
Year	English title	Original title	Director(s)	Production countrie(s)
Opening film
2022	Scent of the Wind		Seyed Hadi Mohaghegh	Iran
Closing film
2022	A Man	ある男	Kei Ishikawa	Japan

=== Gala Presentation ===
English title	Original title	Director(s)	Production countrie(s)
Nobody's Hero	Viens je t'emmène	Alain Guiraudie	France
Scarlet	L'Envol	Pietro Marcello	France, Italy, Germany

=== Icons ===
English title	Original title	Director(s)	Production countrie(s)
Armageddon Time		James Gray	United States
Bardo	Bardo, o falsa crónica de unas cuantas verdades	Alejandro González Iñárritu	Mexico
Bones and All		Luca Guadagnino	Italy, United States
Both Sides of the Blade	Avec amour et acharnement	Claire Denis	France
Broker	브로커	Hirokazu Kore-eda	South Korea
Brother and Sister	Frère et Sœur	Arnaud Desplechin	France
Crimes of the Future		David Cronenberg	Canada, Greece, France, United Kingdom
Dark Glasses	Occhiali neri	Dario Argento	Italy, France
Decision to Leave	헤어질 결심	Park Chan-wook	South Korea
EO	Io	Jerzy Skolimowski	Poland, Italy
Fairytale	Сказка	Alexander Sokurov	Russia, Belgium, Estonia
Feast		Brillante Mendoza	Hong Kong, China
Lord of the Ants	Il signore delle formiche	Gianni Amelio	Italy
My Imaginary Country	Mi país imaginario	Patricio Guzmán	France, Chile
No Bears	خرس نیست	Jafar Panahi	Iran
One Fine Morning	Un beau matin	Mia Hansen-Løve	France, Germany
Pacifiction	Tourment sur les Îles	Albert Serra	Spain, France, Germany, Portugal
Peter von Kant		François Ozon	France, Belgium
R.M.N.		Cristian Mungiu	Romania, France
The Banshees of Inisherin		Martin McDonagh	Ireland, United Kingdom, United States
The Novelist's Film	소설가의 영화	Hong Sang-soo	South Korea
Triangle of Sadness		Ruben Östlund	Sweden, Germany, France, United Kingdom, United States, Greece
Walk Up	탑	Hong Sang-soo	South Korea
When the Waves Are Gone	Kapag Wala Nang Mga Alon	Lav Diaz	Philippines / France / Portugal / Denmark
White Noise		Noah Baumbach	United States

=== New Currents ===
The selected titles are eligible for multiple awards, including the New Currents Award, the FIPRESCI Award, the NETPAC Award, and the KB New Currents Audience Award.

Highlighted title indicates award winner

English title	Original title	Director(s)	Production countrie(s)
Ajoomma		He Shuming	Singapore
A Place of Silence		Sam Kua	Malaysia
A Thousand and One Nights		Nao Kubota	Japan
A Wild Roomer	괴인	Lee Jeong-hong	South Korea
Blue Again		Thapanee Loosuwan	Thailand
Long Live Hell	지옥만세	Im Oh-jeong	South Korea
Memento Mori: Earth	Memento Mori: Đất	Marcus Mạnh Cường Vũ	Vietnam
No End		Nader Saeivar	Iran
The Winter Within	Maagh	Aamir Bashir	India
That Woman Shybamma		Jaishankar Ariar	India

=== Kim Jiseok ===
English title	Original title	Director(s)	Production countrie(s)
Alteration		Yorkin Tuichev	Uzbekistan
December		Anshul Chauhan	Japan
Life & Life		Ali Ghavitan	Iran
Scent of Wind		Hadi Mohaghegh	Iran
Seventeeners		Prithvi Konanur	India
Six Characters		ML Pundhevanov Dewakun	Thailand
The Storyteller		Anant Mahadevan	India
A Wing and a Prayer	동에 번쩍 서에 번쩍	Lee Kwang-guk	Korea

=== A Window on Asian Cinema ===
English title	Original title	Director(s)	Production countrie(s)
Arnold Is a Model Student		Sorayos Prapapan	Thailand, Singapore, France, Netherlands, Philippines
Autobiography		Makbul Mubarak	Indonesia, France, Singapore, Poland, Philippines, Germany, Qatar
B for Busy	爱情神话	Shao Yi-Hui	China
Before, Now & Then	Nana	Kamila Andini	Indonesia
Beyond the Wall	شب، داخلی، دیوار	Vahid Jalilvand	Iran
Declaration	Ariyippu	Mahesh Narayanan	India
Fortune		Muhiddin Muzaffar	Tajikistan
Goldfish		Pushan Kripalani	India, United Kingdom, United States
Hanging Gardens	Janain mualaqa	Ahmed Yassin Al Daradji	Iraq, Egypt, Palestine, Saudi Arabia, Lebanon, United Kingdom
Holy Spider		Ali Abbasi	Denmark, Sweden, France, Germany
Home for Sale		Taalaibek Kulmendeev	Kyrgyzstan
Hong Kong Family		Eric Tsang Hing Weng	Hong Kong, China
In Our Prime		Liu Yulin	China
Joyland		Saim Sadiq	Pakistan
Leila's Brothers	برادران لیلا	Saeed Roustayi	Iran
Little Blue		Lee Yifang	Taiwan
Look At Me Touch Me Kiss Me		Ho Yuhang, Djenar Maesa Ayu, Kim Tai-sik	Malaysia, Indonesia, Korea
Love Life	ラブライフ	Kōji Fukada	Japan
Mariam		Arvind Pratap	India
Nezouh		Soudade Kaadan	United Kingdom, Syria, France
Plan 75		Chie Hayakawa	Japan, France, Philippines, Qatar
Return to Dust	隐入尘烟	Li Ruijun	China
Return to Seoul	Retour à Séoul	Davy Chou	France
Scheme	Skhema	Farkhat Sharipov	Kazakhstan
Sermon to the Fish	Balıqlara xütbə	Hilal Baydarov	Azerbaijan, Mexico, Switzerland, Turkey
Stone Turtle		Woo Ming Jin	Malaysia, Indonesia
The Sales Girl		Janchivdorj Sengedorj	Mongolia
The Scent of the Wormwood		Aibek Dairbekov	Kyrgyzstan
The Wind Will Say		Renai Wei Yongyao	Malaysia, China
Tora's Husband		Rima Das	India
Zwigato		Nandita Das	India

=== Korean Cinema Today - Panorama ===
English title	Original title	Director(s)
A Letter from Kyoto	교토에서 온 편지	Kim Min Ju
Anchor	앵커	Jung Ji-yeon
Dream Palace	드림팰리스	Ka Sung-moon
Hansan: Rising Dragon	한산: 용의 출현	Kim Han-min
Highway Family	고속도로 가족	Lee Sang-moon
Juhee from 5 to 7	5시부터 7시까지의 주희	Jang Kun-jae
Next Sohee	다음 소희	Jung Ju-ri
Open the Door	오픈 더 도어	Jang Hang-jun
The Policeman's Lineage	경관의 피	Lee Kyoo-man

=== Korean Cinema Today - Vision Section ===
This year 12 films will be showcased as world premiere.

Highlighted title indicates award winner

English title	Original title	Director(s)
Birth		Yoo Ji-young
Peacock	공작새	Byun Seong-bin
Beyond	기행	Lee Ha-ram
The Day After Yesterday	길고 재미없는 영화가 끝나갈 때	Yoon Ji-hye
The Dream Songs	너와 나	Cho Hyun-cheol
The Ripples	물비늘	Lim Seung-hyun
Green House	비닐하우스	Lee Sol-hee
Big Sleep	빅슬립	Kim Tae-hoon
Mother Land	엄마의 땅	Park Jae-beom
Star of Ulsan	울산의 별	Jeong Ki-hyeok
The Continuing Land	이어지는 땅	Cho Hee-Young
Paper Man	페이퍼맨	Ki Mo-tae

=== Korean Cinema Today - Special Premiere ===
English title	Original title	Director(s)
20th Century Girl	20세기 소녀	Bang Woo-ri
The Boys	소년들	Jung Ji-young

=== World Cinema ===
English title	Original title	Director(s)	Production countrie(s)
A Room of My Own	Chemi otakhi	Ioseb 'Soso' Bliadze	Germany, Georgia
Aftersun		Charlotte Wells	United Kingdom, United States
Alcarràs	Alcarràs - L'ultimo raccolto	Carla Simón	Spain, Italy
BANGER.		Adam Sedlák	Czech Republic
Blanquita		Fernando Guzzoni	Chile, Mexico, Luxembourg, France, Poland
Blind Willow, Sleeping Woman		Pierre Földes	France, Canada, Netherlands, Luxembourg
Boy from Heaven		Tarik Saleh	Sweden, France, Finland
Brother		Clement Virgo	Canada
Chiara		Susanna Nicchiarelli	Italy, Belgium
Close		Lukas Dhont	Belgium, France, Netherlands
Corsage		Marie Kreutzer	Austria, Luxembourg, Germany, France
Flux Gourmet		Peter Strickland	United Kingdom, Hungary
Fucking Bornholm		Anna Kazejak	Poland
Harkis		Philippe Faucon	France, Belgium
I Have Electric Dreams	Tengo sueños eléctricos	Valentina Maurel	Belgium, France, Costa Rica
Incredible but True		Quentin Dupieux	France, Belgium
Klondike		Maryna Er Gorbach	Ukraine, Turkey
Love According to Dalva	Dalva	Emmanuelle Nicot	Belgium, France
Monica		Andrea Pallaoro	Italy, United States
Other People's Children	Les Enfants des Autres	Rebecca Zlotowski	France
Prison 77	Modelo 77	Alberto Rodríguez Librero	Spain
Prologos		Mantas Kvedaravičius	Lithuania, Greece
Raymond and Ray		Rodrigo García	United States
Rule 34	Regra 34	Júlia Murat	Brazil, France
Saturn Bowling	Bowling Saturne	Patricia Mazuy	France, Belgium
The Adventures of Gigi the Law	Gigi la legge	Alessandro Comodin	Italy, France, Belgium
The Eight Mountains	Le otto montagne	Felix van Groeningen, Charlotte Vandermeersch	Italy, Belgium, France
The Line	La Ligne	Ursula Meier	Switzerland, France, Belgium
The Mountain	La Montagne	Thomas Salvador	France
The Night of the 12th	La Nuit du 12	Dominik Moll	France
The Quiet Girl	An Cailín Ciúin	Colm Bairéad	Ireland
The Silent Twins		Agnieszka Smoczyńska	Poland, United States, United Kingdom
Utama		Alejandro Loayza Grisi	Bolivia, Uruguay, France
You Have to Come and See It	Tenéis que venir a verla	Jonás Trueba	Spain

=== Flash Forward ===
A competition among non-Asian filmmakers’ first or second features that take an innovative and original approach to cinema. The winner is decided by the audience and awarded the Flash Forward Award.

English title	Original title	Director(s)	Production countrie(s)
Daughter of Rage	La Hija de todas las Rabias	Laura Baumeister	Nicaragua, Mexico, Netherlands, Germany, France, Norway
Delta		Michele Vannucci	Italy
The Pack	La Jauria	Andrés Ramírez Pulido	Colombia, France
Muru		Tearepa Kahi	New Zealand
Palm Trees and Power Lines		Jamie Dack	United States
Riceboy Sleeps		Anthony Shim	Canada
Saint Omer		Alice Diop	France
Sons of Ramses	Goutte d'Or	Clément Cogitore	France
Thunder	Foudre	Carmen Jaquier	Switzerland
Victim	Obet	Michal Blaško	Slovak Republic, Czech Republic, Germany

=== Wide Angle ===
==== Korean Short Film Competition ====
English title	Original title	Director(s)
Canine	송곳니	Kim Jung-min
Carrier Woman	캐리어우먼	Hwang Dong-uk
Door		Lee Minh-young, Bae Seongyeol, Kim Chang-min
Flowers		Shin Eun-seop-uk
I′m Here		Jeong Eun-uk
Jooyoung in Wonderland		Chung Hae-il
Lake and I		Park Sohyun
Leave at Door, Bell X		Lee Joo-young
Other Life		Roh Do-hyeon
Short Film Universe		Lee Han
The Scream		Kim Eun-seong
Yeo-young′s Trip to Haenam		Yeo Young-eun

==== Asian Short Film Competition ====
English title	Original title	Director(s)	Production country(s)
A Cambodian Night′s Dream		Guillaume Suon	Cambodia, France
Dear Me		Suchana Saha	India
Destruction		Igor Smola	Azerbaijan
Drunkard		GE Yuqi	China
Jouissance		Sadeq Es-Haqi	Iran
Shades of Melancholy		Karash Zhanyshov	Kyrgyzstan
Smoke Gets In Your Eyes		Alvin Lee	Singapore
Southern Afternoon		Lan Tian	China
The Memory Lane		Ujita Shun	Japan
The Valley of the Wind		Samira Norouznasseri	Iran

==== Documentary Competition ====
English title	Original title	Director(s)	Production country(s)
A Table for Two		Kim Bo-ram	South Korea
After Passing Away		SU Yu-Ting	Taiwan
Again the Wind Blows		Kim Tae-il, Ju Ro-mi	South Korea
Baby Queen		Lei Yuan Bin	Singapore
Dear Mother, I Meant to Write about Death		Chen Siyi	United States, China
Lash		Jung Yoon-suk	South Korea, Hong Kong, China
On the Train		Hsiao Chu-Chen	Taiwan
SAGAL: Snake and Scorpion		Lee Dongwoo	South Korea
Sanctuary		Wang Min-cheol	South Korea
Sura: A Love Song		Hwang Yun	South Korea
The Football Aficionado		Sharmin Mojtahedzadeh, Paliz Khoshdel	Iran

==== Documentary Showcase ====
English title	Original title	Director(s)	Production countrie(s)
Alis		Clare Weiskopf, Nicolas van Hamelryck	Colombia, Chile, Romania
All That Breathes		Shaunak Sen	India, United States, United Kingdom
Blue Island		Chan Tze-woon	Hong Kong, China, Taiwan, Japan
Eternal Brightness		OH Min-wook	South Korea
Fire of Love		Sara DOSA	United States, Canada
Free Chol Soo Lee		Julie HA, Eugene YI	South Korea, United States
How to Save a Dead Friend		Marusya Syroechkovskaya	Sweden, Norway, France, Germany
Innocence		Guy Davidi	Denmark, Israel, Finland, Iceland
Legend of the Waterflowers		Koh Hee-young	South Korea
Life Unrehearsed		Banpark Jieun	South Korea, Germany
Liquor Store Dreams		UM So Yun	United States
Myanmar Diaries		The Myanmar Film Collective	Netherlands, Myanmar, Norway
Retrograde		Matthew Heineman	United States
Scorched Earth		Lee Mi-young	South Korea, Canada
See You Friday		Robinson Mitra Farahani	France, Kingdom of Eswatini, Iran, Lebanon
The Super 8 Years		David Ernaux-Briot, Annie Ernaux	France
Universe Department Store		Taewoong Won	South Korea
While We Watched		Vinay Shukla	United Kingdom

=== Open Cinema ===
A collection of new films screened at the hallmark outdoor theater.

English title	Original title	Director(s)	Production countrie(s)
Diary of a Fleeting Affair	Chronique d'une liaison passagère	Emmanuel Mouret	France
Even If This Love Disappears From the World Tonight	ja:今夜、世界からこの恋が消えても	Takahiro Miki	Japan
Everything Everywhere All at Once		Daniel Kwan, Daniel Scheinert	United States
Kingdom 2: Far and Away	ja:キングダム2 遥かなる大地へ	Shinsuke Sato	Japan
Max, Min and Meowzaki Padmakumar		Padmakumar Narasimhamurthy	India
Black Pharaon, the Savage and the Princess	Le Pharaon, le Sauvage et la Princesse	Michel Ocelot	France, Belgium
Vikram		Lokesh Kanagaraj	India

=== Midnight Passion ===
A collection of thrillers, horror and action films.

English title	Original title	Director(s)	Production countrie(s)
Jethica		Pete Ohs	United States
Satan's Slaves 2: Communion	Pengabdi Setan 2: Communion	Joko Anwar	Indonesia
The Menu		Mark Mylod	United States
The Price We Pay		Ryuhei Kitamura	United States

=== On Screen ===
Nine drama series of the year were presented in this section.

English title	Original title	Director(s)	Production countrie(s)	Platform / Network
Bargain	몸값	Jeon Woo-sung	South Korea	TVING
Blood Curse	Teluh Darah	Kimo Stamboel	Indonesia	Disney+ Hotstar
Connect	커넥트	Miike Takashi	South Korea	Star
Glitch	글리치	Roh Deok	South Korea	Netflix
Recipe for Farewell	오늘은 좀 매울지도 몰라	Lee Ho-Jae	South Korea	Watcha
Somebody	썸바디	Jung Ji-woo	South Korea	Netflix
The Kingdom Exodus	Riget Exodus	Lars von Trier	Denmark	DR/Viaplay
Weak Hero Class 1	약한영웅	Yoo Su-min	South Korea	Wavve
Yonder	욘더	Lee Joon-ik	South Korea	TVING/Paramount+

== Special program in focus ==
=== Discovering New Japanese Cinema ===
The festival will screen the works of 10 notable next-generation Japanese directors who have made their debuts after 2010 and who have been acknowledged by the press and critics.

Year	English title	Original title	Director(s)	Genre
2015	Antonym	螺旋銀河	Kusano Natsuka	Drama
2020	A Balance	由宇子の天秤	Yujiro Harumoto	Mystery, Psychological, Family
2017	Listen to Light	ひかりの歌	Sugita Kyoshi	Drama
2022	My Small Land	マイスモールランド	Emma Kawawada	Drama
2017	The Night I Swam	泳ぎすぎた夜	Kohei Igarashi, Damien Manivel	Drama
2018	Our House	わたしたちの家	Kiyohara Yui	Thriller, horror
2017	Passage of Life	僕の帰る場所	Akio Fujimoto	Drama
2018	Siblings of the Cape	岬の兄妹	Shinzo Katayama	Drama
2022	Small, Slow But Steady	ケイコ目を澄ませて	Sho Miyake	Drama
2021	Third Time Lucky	三度目の、正直	Tadashi Nohara	Drama

=== New Perspective of Documentary in the 21st Century ===
In 2022 edition the festival will present a special program 'A New Perspective on Documentary in the 21st Century' introducing 10 innovative documentaries. These films will be fresh and unique works that go beyond the traditional documentary genre.

Year	English title	Original title	Director(s)	Country of origin
2012	Leviathan		Lucien Castaing-Taylor, Véréna Paravel	United States
2022	De Humani Corporis Fabrica		Lucien Castaing-Taylor, Véréna Paravel	France, Switzerland
2014	Silvered Water, Syria Self-Portrait	ماء الفضة	Ossama Mohammed, Wiam Simav Bedirxan	Syria
2014	Three Sisters	三姊妹	Wang Bing	China
2007	My Winnipeg		Guy Maddin	Canada
2016	Cameraperson		Kirsten Johnson	United States
2007	In the City of Sylvia	En la Ciudad de Sylvia	José Luis Guerín	Spain
2022	Everything Will Be Okay		Rithy Panh	Cambodia
2022	The Natural History of Destruction		Sergei Rosnica	Germany, Ukraine
2013	Sacro GRA		Gianfranco Rossi	Italy

=== In the Mood for Tony Leung ===
Year	English title	Original title	Director(s)	Country of origin
2004	2046		Wong Kar-wai	Hong Kong, China
1997	Happy Together	春光乍洩	Wong Kar-wai	Hong Kong
2000	In the Mood for Love	花樣年華	Wong Kar-wai	Hong Kong
2002	Infernal Affairs	無間道	Andrew Lau, Alan Mak	Hong Kong
1993	The Eagle Shooting Heroes	射雕英雄傳之東成西就	Jeffrey Lau	Hong Kong
1998	The Longest Nite	暗花	Patrick Yau	Hong Kong

=== Special Screening ===
Year	English title	Original title	Director(s)
	Jiseok		Kim Young-jo
1952	Nakdong River	낙동강	Jeon Chang-geun

== Awards and winners ==
Awards

The following awards were presented at the 27th edition:

- The Asian Filmmaker of the Year
- Korean Cinema Award
- New Currents Award
- Kim Jiseok Award
- BIFF Mecenat Award
- Sonje Award
- Actor & Actress of the Year Award
  - Actor of the Year:
  - Actress of the Year:
- KB New Currents Audience Award
- Flash Forward Audience Award
- FIPRESCI Award
- NETPAC Award
- DGK MEGABOX Award
- CGV Arthouse Award
- KBS Independent Film Award
- CGK Award (Cinematographers Guild of Korea)
- Critic b Award
- Watcha Award from 2021
- Citizen Critics' Award
- Busan Cinephile Award

=== Winners ===
Image	Recipient	Country	Ref.
The Asian Filmmaker of the Year
	Tony Leung Chiu-wai	Hong Kong	
Choon-yun Award
Baek Jae-ho		South Korea	
Korean Cinema Award
Goran Topalovic		United States	

- New Currents Award:
  - A Wild Roomer by Lee Jeong-hong, South Korea
  - Shivamma by Jaishankar Aryar, India
- KIM Jiseok Award:
  - Scent of Wind by Hadi Mohaghegh, Iran
  - Alterations by Yalkin Tuychiev, Uzbekistan
- BIFF Mecenat Award
  - A Table for Two by Kim Bo-ram, South Korea
  - The Football Aficionado by Sharmin Mojtahedzadeh, Paliz Khoshdel, Iran
- Sonje Award:
  - Southern Afternoon by Lan Tian, China
  - I’m Here by Jeong Eunuk, South Korea
- Actors of the Year:
  - Kim Youngsung, Big Sleep, Actor, South Korea
  - KIM Geumsoon, Star of Ulsan, Actress, South Korea
- KB New Currents Audience Award:
  - The Winter Within by Aamir Bashir, India, France, Qatar
- Flash Forward Audience Award:
  - Riceboy Sleeps by Anthony Shim, Canada
- FIPRESCI Award:
  - Thousand and One Nights by Kubota Nao, Japan
- NETPAC Award:
  - A Wild Roomer by Lee Jeong-hong, Director South Korea
- DGK MEGABOX Award:
  - Big Sleep by Kim Tae-hoon, South Korea
  - Star of Ulsan by Jung Ki-hyuk, South Korea
- CGV Award Greenhouse:
  - Lee Sol-hui, Director, South Korea
- KBS Independent Film Award:
  - A Wild Roomer by Lee Jeong-hong, South Korea
- CGK Award:
  - Hail to Hell by Jung Grim, Cinematographer South Korea
- Critic b Award:
  - A Wild Roomer by Lee Jeong-hong, South Korea
- Watcha Award:
  - Peafowl by Byun Sung-bin, South Korea
  - Greenhouse by Lee Sol-hui, South Korea
- Watcha Short Award:
  - Other Life by Roh Dohyeon, South Korea
- Aurora Media Award:
  - Greenhouse by Lee Sol-hui, South Korea
  - Big Sleep by Kim Tae-hoon, South Korea
- Citizen Critics’ Award:
  - Birth by Yoo Ji-young, South Korea
- Busan Cinephile Award:
  - While We Watched by Vinay Shukla, United Kingdom
- The Choon-yun Award
  - Baej Jae-ho, Producer, South Korea
