= Sigrid van Aken =

Dutch businesswoman

Sigrid van Aken (born March 1, 1970, Amsterdam) is the chief executive officer of Postcode Lottery Group, recognized as the world's third largest private charity donor, after the Bill & Melinda Gates Foundation and the Wellcome Trust. The Postcode Lottery Group has raised 15 billion euros for charities.

== Early life and career ==
Sigrid van Aken studied French Language and Literature at the University of Utrecht. She joined Rabobank Paris in 1994. In 1998, she became senior IT consultant for KPMG Consulting.

In 2002, van Aken joined VriendenLoterij and Nationale Postcode Loterij, lotteries of Novamedia / Postcode Lottery Group.

In 2009, she completed a leadership program at the International Institute for Management Development (IMD) in Lausanne, Switzerland.

After holding multiple senior and international leadership roles over her two-decade career at Postcode Lottery Group, and since 2013 as executive board member/COO, she assumed the role of CEO, succeeding Boudewijn Poelmann, in 2020.

Beyond her corporate responsibilities, van Aken served on the Supervisory Board of Amsterdam's public transport company GVB from 2013 to 2021.

== As a CEO ==
Van Aken is responsible for all entities and operations of the postcode lotteries in five countries: Netherlands (1989), Sweden (2005), Great Britain (2005), Germany (2016), and Norway (2018) – the latter are collectively known as the Postcode Lottery Group. In 2024, the group announced the establishment of the Canadian Postcode Lottery Foundation in Canada.

The year following her appointment as CEO, van Aken was invited to speak at the prestigious Prinsjesdagontbijt, held on Prinsjesdag, marking the annual opening of the Dutch parliamentary year.

Since its inception, the Postcode Lottery Group has raised more than 13.5 billion euros in support of thousands of charitable initiatives, locally and internationally. According to the Associated Press, in 2023, the group stood among the largest private donors to Ukraine, contributing 155.2 million euros (165.9 million USD) to humanitarian and human rights organizations operating in Ukraine or assisting refugees. The Dutch branch donated 100.6 million euros (113.3 million dollars).

== Awards and honors ==
Sigrid van Aken was admitted into the Order of the Légion d'Honneur by the French Government in October 2025 during the Paris Peace Forum.

Van Aken has been repeatedly ranked in the Dutch publication Opzij's top 100 as the most influential woman in the Charities category.

In 2020, she made it to the 59th position of the de Volkskrant Top 200, the list of most influential Dutch people.

== Personal life ==
Sigrid van Aken lives in Amsterdam with her family.
