= Boudewijn Poelmann =

Dutch entrepreneur

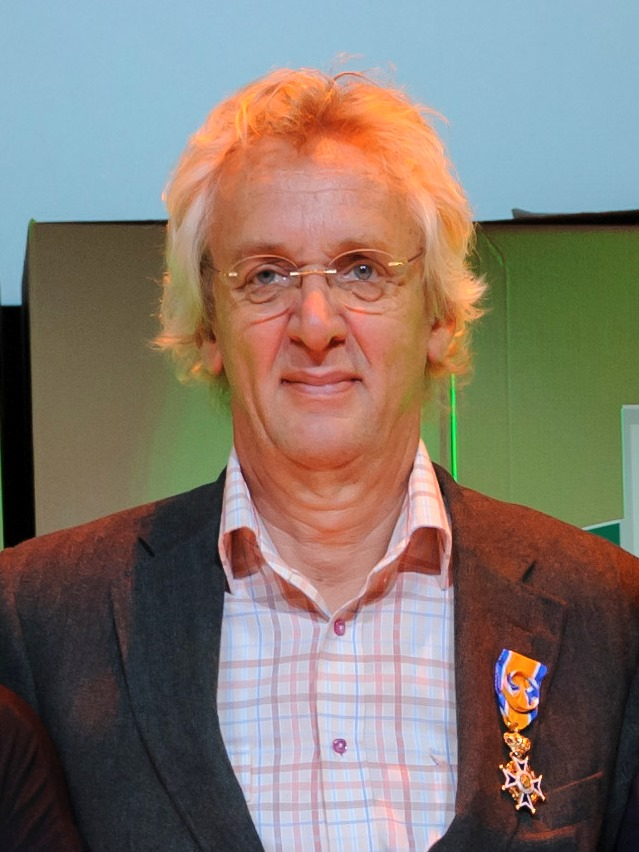
Poelmann (2012)

Boudewijn Poelmann (born 3 February 1949, Bussum) is a Dutch entrepreneur and co-founder of the Netherlands' Nationale Postcode Lottery. In 1983, he helped to start the media company, Novamedia.

Before establishing Novamedia in 1983, he worked with DAF and Oxfam Novib (Dutch organization for international development aid). At Oxfam Novib he was responsible for fundraising and oversaw its publishing house. In addition, he acquired experience in European TV, telephone and printed media businesses. Until September 1992 he was also the director of Inter Press Service, Europe.

Poelmann is one of the founders/owners of Independent Media, which became the second largest publishing house in the Russian Federation. He was the chairman of the board of directors until 2004 when Independent Media was sold to Sanoma Publishing. In 2004, he co-founded City AM, a daily financial newspaper in London. One year later he co-founded the new Dutch publishing house Nieuw Amsterdam. He was a member of the board of Feyenoord Rotterdam.

Beginning of 2020 Sigrid van Aken took over as CEO of Novamedia.

== Publication ==
- Ineke Holtwijk: De mannen van de droomfabriek. Het verhaal achter het succes van de Postcode Loterij. Amsterdam, Balans, 2015, ISBN 978-94-6003-201-1
