= Parampara (disambiguation) =

Parampara is a succession of teachers and disciples in traditional Indian culture.

Parampara may also refer to:

- Parampara (1990 film), a Malayalam film
- Parampara (1993 film), a Bollywood film
- Parampara (1993 TV series)
- Parampara (2021 TV series)
- Parampara Thakur, one half of the Sachet–Parampara duo
