= Tu Meri Main Tera Main Tera Tu Meri =

2025 Indian film by Sameer Vidwans

- Theatrical release poster
- Directed by: Sameer Vidwans
- Written by: Karan Shrikant Sharma
- Produced by: Karan Johar; Adar Poonawalla; Apoorva Mehta; Bhumika Tewari; Shareen Mantri Kedia; Kishor Arore
- Starring: Kartik Aaryan; Ananya Panday; Neena Gupta; Jackie Shroff; Tiku Talsania
- Cinematography: Anil Mehta
- Edited by: Manan Mehta
- Music by: Songs: Vishal–Shekhar; Karan Nawani; Background Score: Hitesh Sonik
- Production companies: Dharma Productions; Namah Pictures
- Distributed by: Dharma Productions
- Release date: 25 December 2025
- Running time: 145 minutes
- Country: India
- Language: Hindi
- Budget: ₹90 crore
- Box office: est. ₹48.02 crore

Tu Meri Main Tera Main Tera Tu Meri (transl. You're mine, I'm yours, I’m yours, you’re mine) is a 2025 Indian Hindi-language romantic comedy film written by Karan Shrikant Sharma, directed by Sameer Vidwans and produced by Karan Johar, Adar Poonawalla, Apoorva Mehta, Bhumika Tewari, Shareen Mantri Kedia and Kishor Arora under the banners of Dharma Productions and Namah Pictures. The film stars Kartik Aaryan and Ananya Panday in the roles, alongside Neena Gupta, Jackie Shroff and Tiku Talsania in supporting roles.

Tu Meri Main Tera Main Tera Tu Meri was theatrically released on 25 December 2025, coinciding with Christmas. It received negative reviews from critics, with praise for the cinematography and production values but criticism for the story, screenplay, direction and Kartik Aaryan's performance. The film was a box office bomb grossing ₹48.02 crore worldwide.

== Plot ==
Rehaan "Ray" Mehra is a high-flying, cynical wedding planner based in Los Angeles who runs the agency Hitched Forever with his independent, single mother, Pinky. During a luxury yacht cruise in Croatia, Ray meets Rumi Vardhan, an aspiring novelist from Agra who is on a solo trip before her sister's wedding. Rumi is a romantic who believes in the "90s Bollywood" template of love, while Ray is a product of modern hookup culture. Despite their initial friction, the two fall in love and have sex. After ten days they return home.

The conflict arises when Ray proposes marriage. Rumi reveals that she cannot move to America because she is the primary caregiver for her widowed, aging father, Colonel Amar Wardhan Singh . With her elder sister Jia set to move to Canada after her upcoming wedding, Rumi feels a deep moral obligation to stay in their ancestral home in Agra. In a moment of emotional distress, she tells Ray she can only marry him after her father is no longer around—a statement she immediately regrets but chooses to break off the relationship before returning to India.

Determined to win her back, Ray travels to Agra. He uses his professional skills to take over the planning of Jia's wedding to stay close to the family. He eventually wins over the Colonel by bonding over home-cooked meals and assisting the family when the Colonel is hospitalized following a sleepwalking accident.

Rumi's father realizes the sacrifice his daughter is making and offers to move to the U.S. with them. However, Rumi declines, believing his happiness lies in his home. Seeing their impasse, Ray's mother, Pinky, intervenes and encourages Ray to break traditional norms. Instead of Rumi moving to the U.S., Ray decides to relocate his life and business to Agra. The film ends with Ray making a dramatic entrance at Rumi's book launch, where he proposes again, promising to live with her and her father as a Ghar Jamai (matrilocal resident), thus redefining modern family responsibilities.

== Cast ==
- Kartik Aaryan as Rehaan "Ray" Mehra
- Ananya Panday as Rumi Wardhan Singh
- Neena Gupta as Pinky Mehra, Ray's mother
- Jackie Shroff as Col. Amar Wardhan Singh, Rumi's father
- Chandni Bhabhda as Jia
- Tiku Talsania as Shashtriji
- Grusha Kapoor as Mrs. Bhatia
- Lokesh Mittal as Mr. Bhatia
- Raghav Binani as Sunny
- Gaurav Pandey as Luv
- Mohit Nehra as Sukhi
- Kabir Jai Bedi as Vicky
- Archi Mishra as Sana
- Kartavya Yadav as Shoaib
- Pankhuri Gidwani as Tanya
- Abhishek Kumar as Ghanshyam

== Production ==
In December 2024, Karan Johar announced the film with Kartik Aaryan in the lead role. In June, the makers announced that Ananya Panday would play the lead female role opposite him.

Principal photography began in May 2025 and wrapped on 30 October 2025. The film was shot in Croatia, Nawalgarh in Rajasthan, Taj Mahal in Agra and Mumbai for 57 days, with cinematography handled by Anil Mehta.

== Soundtrack ==
Tu Meri Main Tera Main Tera Tu Meri

Soundtrack album by Vishal–Shekhar
- Released: 16 December 2025
- Recorded: 2024–2025
- Genre: Feature film soundtrack
- Length: 22:32
- Language: Hindi
- Label: Saregama
- Producers: Abhijit Nalani; Akarsh Shetty

Vishal–Shekhar chronology
Fighter (2024)	Tu Meri Main Tera Main Tera Tu Meri (2025)
External audio
- Official Audio Jukebox on YouTube

The soundtrack is composed by Vishal–Shekhar, with the lyrics written by Anvita Dutt and Kumaar. The title track was released on 28 November 2025. The second single "Hum Dono" was released on 5 December 2025. The song "Saat Samundar Paar" is a remake of the song of same name from the 1992 film Vishwatma sung by Sadhana Sargam, composed by Viju Shah and written by Anand Bakshi.

Track listing
No.	Title	Lyrics	Singer(s)	Length
1.	"Tu Meri Main Tera Main Tera Tu Meri - Title Track"	Anvita Dutt	Vishal Dadlani, Shekhar Ravjiani	3:03
2.	"Tenu Zyada Mohabbat"	Kumaar	Talwiinder	3:31
3.	"Hum Dono"	Anvita Dutt	Shekhar Ravjiani, Shruti Pathak, Vishal Dadlani	4:19
4.	"Mudh Ja Raahiye"	Anvita Dutt	Jubin Nautiyal	4:42
5.	"Dil Musafir"	Anvita Dutt	Lucky Ali	3:40
6.	"Saat Samundar Paar" (Music by Karan Nawani)	Karan Nawani	Karan Nawani	3:17
Total length:				22:32

== Marketing ==
The film's teaser was released on 22 November 2025.

== Release ==
=== Theatrical ===
The film was originally scheduled to release on Valentine's Day 2026, but the film was preponed to 31 December 2025. However, due to Alpha from the YRF Spy Universe being postponed, the film was further preponed to 25 December 2025.

=== Home media ===
The film began streaming on Amazon Prime Video from 19 February 2026.

== Reception ==
=== Critical reception ===
Tu Meri Main Tera Main Tera Tu Meri received mixed-to-negative reviews from critics. On the review aggregator website Rotten Tomatoes, 8% of 12 critics' reviews are positive, with an average rating of 4/10.

Bollywood Hungama rated the film 3 stars out of 5 and wrote "On the whole, TU MERI MAIN TERA MAIN TERA TU MERI is an urban-centric film that scores high on emotion and scale, and works largely due to the crackling chemistry between Kartik Aaryan and Ananya Panday, along with several heartfelt moments that strike a chord. However, the humour in the first half is uneven, and a few loose ends in the writing dilute the overall impact." Titas Chowdhury of News18 rated the film 3 stars out of 5 and wrote "TMMTMTTM has its heart in the right place and its intent is earnest but it seldom knows when to pull back. It has its moments and even a surface-level charm. It entertains briefly, offers sporadic humour, overstays occasionally." Tanmayi Savadi of Times Now rated the film 3 stars out of 5 and wrote "Tu Meri Main Tera Main Tera Tu Meri is a long film, just like its title. The see-saw between decent and bad continues throughout the runtime. It is exhausting, but the bright colours, lavishness and good-looking people with chemistry keep the ball rolling."

Rishabh Suri of Hindustan Times rated the film 2.5 stars out of 5 and wrote "Overall, TMMTMTTM is a scenic postcard with no message written on the back. You might stay for the warmth of the veterans, but you will leave still searching for the love the title promised." Dhaval Roy of The Times Of India rated the film 2.5 stars out of 5 and wrote "With just a few parts landing, this rom-com may only appeal to those drawn to contemporary, glossy romances." Vineeta Kumar of India Today rated the film 2 stars out of 5 and wrote "It feels like a pretty Christmas gift, wrapped in glossy paper, only to reveal a Maggi packet inside. This isn't the kind of youthful cinema Gen-Z should be growing up on. And if you do manage to sit through it till the end, you are left wondering what, exactly, you were meant to feel."

Shubhra Gupta of The Indian Express rated the film 1.5 stars out of 5 and wrote "It says something about us as viewers that we like our filmi romances to masquerade as soppy family dramas, and how they only kick in when the gaana-bajaana and rona-dhona starts. Or do we? Is this a myth Bollywood refuses to walk past? Whatever happened to being in sync with changing times? It’s almost 2026, bro, no?" Zinia B. of Firstpost rated the film 1.5 stars out of 5 and wrote "Watch TMMT it if Croatia is on your bucket list and you need cinematic motivation to finally plan that trip. Or if you’re a die-hard Kartik Aaryan fan who will laugh at any joke he cracks, no matter how tired. For everyone else, this one’s best admired from a distance, much like its characters."
