= Shashtipoorthi =

Indian Telugu-language film by Pavan Prabha

- Theatrical release poster
- Directed by: Pavan Prabha
- Written by: Pavan Prabha
- Produced by: Rupesh Kumar Choudhary
- Starring: Rajendra Prasad; Archana; Rupesh Kumar Choudhary; Akanksha Singh
- Cinematography: Raam
- Edited by: Karthika Srinivas
- Music by: Ilayaraja
- Production company: Maai Aaie Productions
- Release date: 30 May 2025
- Running time: 145 minutes
- Country: India
- Language: Telugu

Shashtipoorthi is a 2025 Indian Telugu-language drama film written and directed by Pavan Prabha. The film features Rajendra Prasad, Archana, Rupesh Kumar Choudhary, Aakanksha Singh in lead roles.

The film was released on 30 May 2025.

== Cast ==
- Rajendra Prasad as Diwakar
- Archana as Bhuvana
- Rupesh Kumar Choudhary as Sri Ram
- Aakanksha Singh as Janaki
- Subhalekha Sudhakar
- Prabhas Sreenu
- Chalaki Chanti
- Chakrapani Ananda
- Achyuth Kumar
- Muralidhar Goud
- Anil
- Jabardasth Ram
- Latha
- Swetha
- Ruhi
- Sanjay Swarup
- Appaji Ambarisha Darbha

== Music ==
All music is composed by Ilayaraja.

No.	Title	Lyrics	Singer(s)	Length
1.	"Iru Kannulu Kannulu"	Rahman	S. P. Charan, Vibhavari Apte Joshi	4:13
2.	"Yedo Yejanmalodo"	M. M. Keeravani	Ananya Bhat	5:33
3.	"Veyi Venuvulu"	Chaitanya Prasad	Karthik, Vibhavari Apte Joshi	6:18
4.	"Rathrantha Rache"	Chaitanya Prasad	Yuvan Shankar Raja, Nithyasree Venkatramanan	5:36
5.	"Ottu Petti Raaja"	Rehman	S. P. Charan	4:53

== Release and reception ==
Shashtipoorthi was released on 30 May 2025.

The Times of India rated it 2.5 out of 5 praising the music and cinematography, while criticizing the narration, and screenplay. Aditya Devulapally of Cinema Express rated it 1.5 out of 5, stating, "a technically strong melodrama marred by its outdated sensibilities".

The Hans India rated the movie 3/5 stars.
