= Aamil Keeyan Khan =

Indian Screenwriter and filmmaker

- Occupation: Screenwriter
- Years active: 2022–present

Aamil Keeyan Khan is an Indian screenwriter and actor who works in Hindi films. He has written the screenplay for films such as Runway 34 (2022), Drishyam 2 (2022) which earned him the IIFA Award for Best Story (Adapted), Bholaa (2023), Shaitaan (2024) Sky Force (2025).

== Career ==
Khan made his screenwriting and acting debut with Runway 34 in 2022 marking his first collaboration with Ajay Devgn as a star and director. He followed it up with the 2022 film Drishyam 2, which opened to positive reviews, grossing ₹100 crore (US$13 million) worldwide in four days and entering the 100 Crore Club in India within six days of release. Earning ₹345 crore (US$43 million) worldwide, Drishyam 2 emerged as a major financial success, becoming the highest-grossing Hindi film of 2022 and the 24th highest-grossing Hindi film of all time.

In 2023, he wrote the adapted screenplay and dialogues for Bholaa, a remake of Lokesh Kanagaraj's Kaithi. Bholaa was released on 30 March 2023 and received mixed reviews from critics. The film has grossed ₹111 crore (US$14 million) worldwide. In 2024, Khan wrote Shaitaan, which opened to positive reviews. With a worldwide gross of ₹211 crore against a budget of ₹50 crore, the film ranks as the fourth highest grossing Indian film of 2024, the second highest grossing Hindi film of 2024 and the highest grossing Indian horror film of all time.

== Filmography ==
Year	Film	Notes
2022	Runway 34	Also actor
2022	Drishyam 2	Also actor
2023	Bholaa	
2024	Shaitaan	
2025	Skyforce	
2025	Maa	
2026	Drishyam: The Conclusion	Also lyricist
