= Runway 34 =

2022 Indian film by Ajay Devgn

- Theatrical release poster
- Directed by: Ajay Devgn
- Written by: Sandeep Kewlani; Aamil Keeyan Khan
- Story by: Sandeep Kewlani
- Produced by: Ajay Devgn
- Starring: Amitabh Bachchan; Ajay Devgn; Rakul Preet Singh; Boman Irani; Angira Dhar; Aakanksha Singh
- Cinematography: Aseem Bajaj
- Edited by: Dharmendra Sharma
- Music by: Jasleen Royal
- Production companies: Bombay Stencil; Good Karma Films; White Falcon Films; Ajay Devgn FFilms
- Distributed by: Panorama Studios (India); Yash Raj Films (International)
- Release date: 29 April 2022
- Running time: 148 minutes
- Country: India
- Language: Hindi
- Budget: ₹100 crore
- Box office: est. ₹53.77 crore

Runway 34 is a 2022 Indian Hindi-language thriller film produced and directed by Ajay Devgn under the Devgn Films banner. The film is inspired by an aviation incident involving a Jet Airways flight 9W-555 from Doha to Kochi on August 17, 2015. The film stars Ajay Devgn, Amitabh Bachchan, and Rakul Preet Singh, with Boman Irani, Angira Dhar and Aakanksha Singh playing pivotal roles.

Runway 34 was released theatrically on 29 April 2022. It received mixed reviews and underperformed at the box office. It was released for digital streaming on Amazon Prime Video on 24 June 2022.

== Plot ==
Captain Vikrant Khanna is an accomplished pilot who is preparing for a flight from Dubai to Cochin. He drinks alcohol and parties the night before the flight and feels tired upon boarding, where his co-pilot is Tanya Albuquerque. Later, a cyclone in Cochin leads to the flight (Skyline 777) being diverted to Trivandrum on Khanna's suggestion, despite Albuquerque insisting that Bengaluru was the safer alternative. She argues that Bengaluru must be the second option—not Trivandrum—as the latter is close to Cochin and likely facing the same severe weather. Khanna maintains that diverting to Trivandrum would allow an earlier landing and save fuel.

Due to a miscommunication by Cochin ATC, the pilots are unaware that Trivandrum's weather and visibility are even worse. Khanna attempts to land on Runway 16 at Trivandrum, facing strong headwinds, but aborts and performs a go-around. He then decides to land on Runway 34, opposite to 16, despite the even deadlier tailwind. Trivandrum ATC prepares for the worst, with hospital beds ready and a rescue team stationed on the runway. Against all odds, Khanna manages to land the flight with his eyes closed, averting a major disaster.

Before the official enquiry, a preliminary interrogation is held, including Khanna's medical test. However, the breathalyzer instrument is damaged, preventing confirmation of whether he was intoxicated. The enquiry, led by AAIB Head Narayan Vedant, focuses on the pilots’ decisions that night. Prior to this, Vedant questions the officials at Cochin ATC about the miscommunication. When he demands the audio tapes of the incident, they inform him that the recordings are overwritten every 12 hours. Furious that such a crucial record was lost, Vedant reprimands them, saying, “Incompetence breeds incompetence,” and orders them not to interfere further in the investigation.

The enquiry gains urgency after Alma Asthana, an elderly woman on the flight who trusted Khanna to land safely, dies of a heart attack en route to the hospital. During the proceedings, Khanna undergoes a polygraph test. Vedant also suspects Khanna of drinking a small bottle of gin on the flight. He then pressures Albuquerque, who ultimately reveals that Khanna had landed the plane with his eyes closed.

In the next session, Khanna explains that he has a photographic memory. Though his eyes were closed, he was visualizing every step of the landing based on previous experience flying private jets into Trivandrum. To prove this, he performs a simulated landing with Vedant as his co-pilot, wearing an eye cap and repeating the same sequence of actions from that night.

As a result, the Cochin ATC official responsible for the miscommunication is terminated, and Vedant initiates an internal investigation into Skyline Airways. Khanna is suspended for three months but is commended for his extraordinary flying skill. Still carrying the weight of the incident, Vikrant tearfully meets Alma Asthana's daughter and assures her he really tried his best. Vedant tells him that he spared him because the country still needs pilots like him—but also reminds him never to forget this “stain” on his career.

Three months later, Vikrant is seen preparing for his next flight. It is revealed that the alcohol had actually been consumed by an air hostess out of sheer panic, and Khanna had tried to cover for her so she wouldn't be punished.

== Cast ==
- Amitabh Bachchan as Narayan Vedant, Head of AAIB
- Ajay Devgn as Captain Vikrant Khanna, The captain of Skyline 777
- Rakul Preet Singh as First Officer Tanya Albuquerque, Vikrant's co-pilot
- Boman Irani as Nishant Suri, owner of the Skyline Airway company
- Angira Dhar as Radhika Roy, Vikrant's lawyer
- Aakanksha Singh as Samaira Khanna, Vikrant's wife
- Nirupama Verma as Samaira's mother
- Avantika Akerkar as Maya Dogra
- Vithalbhai Patel as Amandeep Singh Behal
- Jagdish Kansara as Aamil Khan
- Sudarshan as Kartikey Subramaniam
- Ram Menon as Varun Goswami
- Martin Jishil as Binu Sebastian
- Vijay Nikam as Santoshlal Tripathi, Employee at Cochin ATC
- Aamil Keeyan Khan as Vikram Sukumaran, ATC Trivandrum
- Jiten Mukhi as Titu Kanjani
- Flora Jacob as Alma Asthana, the old lady who dies
- Lokesh Mittal as Chaubey
- Kundan Roy as Chawla
- Al-Mamun Al Siyam as Lumin
- Hrishikesh Pandey as Yusuf Rangoonwala, Head of Pilot's Union
- Rakesh Bhavsar as Ramiz
- CarryMinati as himself (cameo appearance)

== Production ==
=== Development ===
The film was originally titled Mayday. In November 2021, the name of the upcoming film was changed to Runway 34. The number "34" in the film's title was chosen because that was Ajay's age when his daughter Nysa was born. The film is based on true events, in which a plane from Doha to Kochi landed with only a very small amount of fuel left.

=== Filming ===
The official announcement of the film was made on 7 November 2020 and principal photography began on 11 December 2020 in Hyderabad. It is filmed at Hyderabad and Mumbai. The filming halted for sometime due to lockdown, COVID restrictions in 2021. In August 2021, Devgn travelled to Russia to do recce and finalise locations to film the scenes, reportedly later in September Ajay Devgn, Rakul Preet and Boman Irani travelled to Russia to film some airport scenes. The film was wrapped on 17 December 2021.

== Release ==
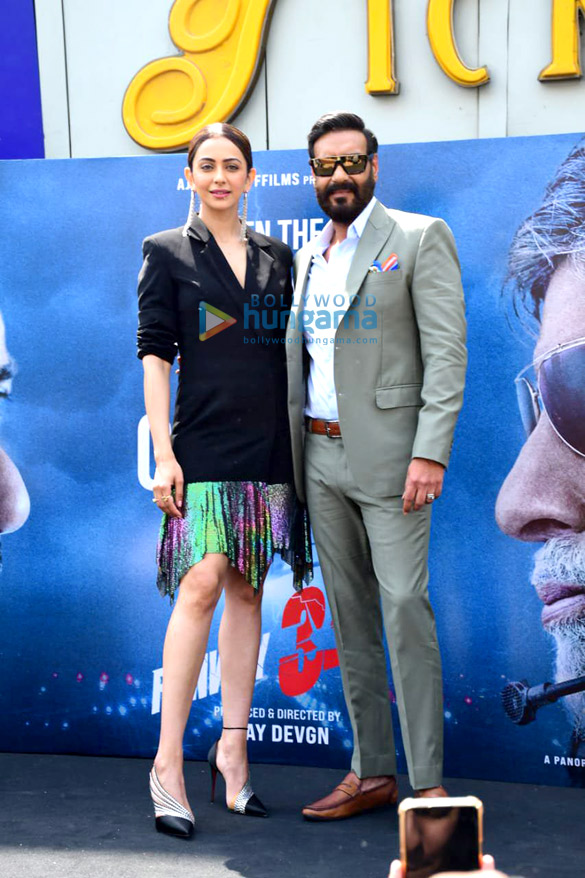
Ajay Devgn and Rakul Preet Singh at the second trailer launch of Runway 34 in Delhi.

The film was released theatrically on 29 April 2022, coinciding with the festival of Eid. It was released on Amazon Prime Video on 24 June 2022.

== Reception ==
=== Box office ===
Runway 34 earned ₹16 crore at the domestic box office on its opening day. On the second day, the film collected ₹9 crore. On the third day, the film collected ₹9.50 crore, taking total domestic weekend collection to ₹35.75 crore.

As of 19 May 2022, the film has grossed ₹45.24 crore in India and ₹34.83 crore overseas for a worldwide gross collection of ₹75 crore.

=== Critical response ===
Runway 34 received mixed reviews from critics. On the review aggregator website Rotten Tomatoes, 50% of 12 critics' reviews are positive, with an average rating of 5.8/10.

Rachana Dubey of The Times Of India gave the film a rating of 4/5 and wrote, "Runway 34 should be experienced for the way it depicts one of the scariest, and a near-disastrous aviation mishap in recent times with engaging characters, thrill and drama." Shweta Keshri of India Today gave the film a rating of 3.5/5 and wrote, "With Runway 34, Ajay Devgn finally finds his tongue as a director, and two atrocious prior attempts." Rohit Bhatnagar of The Free Press Journal gave the film a rating of 3.5/5 and wrote, "With Runway 34, Ajay Devgn surely found his space that is rich in thrill." Nandini Ramnath of Scroll.in gave the film a rating of 3.5/5 and wrote, "Runway 34 is evenly balanced between offenders and the offended before it goes on the defensive." A reviewer from DNA India gave the film a rating of 3.5/5 and wrote, "Runway 34 is a balanced film, with right amount of technical, emotional and masala content." Taran Adarsh from Bollywood Hungama gave the film a rating of 3/5 and wrote, "Despite a gripping first half, the slow moving and conversation heavy second half limit the Ajay Devgn – Amitabh Bachchan starrer Rumway 34 a bit." Saibal Chatterjee of NDTV gave the film a rating of 3/5 and wrote, "Ajay Devgn, with a consistent performance that never goes off the radar, powers Runway 34. Rakul Preet Singh gives a solid account of herself. As for Amitabh Bachchan and other actors, the path is riddled with air pockets caused by blurry writing."

Shilajit Mitra of Cinema Express gave the film a rating of 3/5 and wrote, "Runway 34 is a frequently tense, perfectly serviceable aviation thriller, a genre of questionable repute in Hindi cinema?" Sukanya Verma of Rediff gave the film a rating of 2.5/5 and wrote, "Runway 34 is a clumsy cocktail of Hollywood movies spiked with the Bollywood brand of God complex." Sanjana Jadhav of Pinkvilla gave the film a rating of 2.5/5 and wrote, "Runway 34 can be a one-time watch but there are better aviation dramas you may want to explore." Shubhra Gupta of The Indian Express gave the film a rating of 2.5/5 and wrote, "Ajay Devgn manages to deliver a somewhat effective pre interval portion despite its inelegant, underlined bits, but the film plummets as the curse of second half hits." Navneet Vyasan of News 18 gave the film a rating of 2.5/5 and wrote, "Good VFX but Ajay Devgn's character feels cliched, Amitabh Bachchan holds together the enquiry scenes."

Anna M. M. Vetticad of Firstpost gave the film a rating of 2.5/5 and wrote, "Runway 34 is unmemorable because it lacks a sense of urgency even while recounting a life-and-death story." Monika Rawal Kukreja of The Hindustan Times stated, "The Ajay Devgn directorial, which stars himself, Amitabh Bachchan, and Rakul Preet Singh is an edgy, fast-paced aviation drama that ends up being a great big screen cinematic experience."

== Music ==
Runway 34

Soundtrack album by Jasleen Royal
- Released: 3 June 2022
- Recorded: 2021
- Genre: Feature film soundtrack
- Length: 15:47
- Language: Hindi
- Label: Panorama Music

Official audio
- Runway 34- Full Album on YouTube

The film's music composed by Jasleen Royal while lyrics written by Aditya Sharma.

Track listing
| No. | Title | Singer(s) | Length |
|---|---|---|---|
| 1. | "Mitra Re" | Arijit Singh, Jasleen Royal | 3:41 |
| 2. | "The Fall Song" | Jasleen Royal | 3:08 |
| 3. | "Jalaya Toh Nahin Na" (Music by Yashraj Mukhate & lyrics by Akshay Shinde) | Yashraj Mukhate, Ajay Devgn | 2:21 |
| 4. | "Mitra Re (Reprise)" | Arijit Singh, Jasleen Royal | 3:29 |
| 5. | "The Fall Song (English Version)" | Jasleen Royal | 3:08 |
| 6. | "Mitra Re (Arijit Singh Version)" | Arijit Singh | 3:42 |
| Total length: | | | 19:29 |
