= Aakanksha Singh =

Indian actress (born 1990)

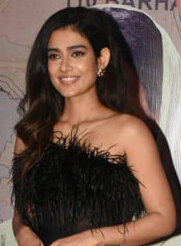
- Singh in 2022
- Born: 30 July 1990 (age 36); Jaipur, Rajasthan, India
- Occupation: Actress
- Years active: 2012–present
- Spouse: Kunal Sain (m. 2014)

Aakanksha Singh (born 30 July 1990) is an Indian actress who primarily works in Hindi and Telugu language films and television. Started as a theatre artiste, she made her screen debut with the Colors TV's television series Na Bole Tum Na Maine Kuch Kaha (2012). She made her film debut with Badrinath Ki Dulhania (2017).

Singh made her Telugu film debut with Malli Raava (2017), for which she received SIIMA Award for Best Female Debut – Telugu nomination. Post this, she earned success with the Telugu film Devadas (2018), Kannada film Pailwaan (2019) and Hindi film Runway 34 (2022). She has been part of television series including, Rangbaaz: Darr Ki Rajneeti and Meet Cute (both 2022).

== Personal life ==
Singh was born on 30 July 1990 in Jaipur, Rajasthan. Her mother is a theatre artist. Singh is a physiotherapist by education. She has married her longtime boyfriend Kunal Sain, a marketing professional, in 2014 in Rajasthan.

== Career ==
=== Initial television career (2012–2017) ===
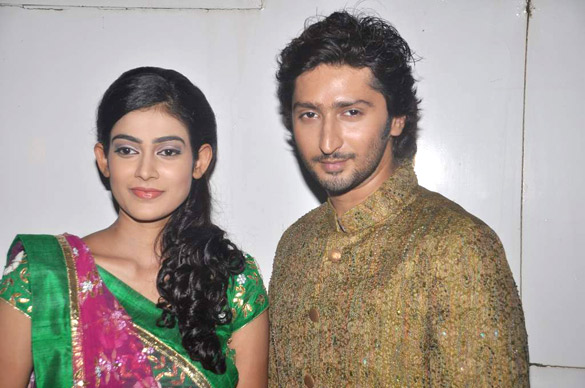
Singh and Kapoor on the sets of Na Bole Tum Na Maine Kuch Kaha

Singh made her acting debut in 2012 with the television show Na Bole Tum Na Maine Kuch Kaha. She portrayed Megha Vyas Bhatnagar, a widow with two children opposite Kunal Karan Kapoor. She won Indian Telly Award for Fresh New Face - Female for her performance. The show ended in 2013, with two seasons.

She next appeared in the finite series, Gulmohar Grand in 2015. The show based on the hotel industry saw her portraying Anahita "Annie" Mehta Fernandez. Singh has also been part of Box Cricket League for the team Ahmedabad Express in 2016. In 2017, she played a lawyer in an episode of Aye Zindagi.

=== Film debut and further career (2017–present) ===
Singh made her film debut with the Hindi film Badrinath Ki Dulhania in 2017. In the same year she made her Telugu debut with Malli Raava opposite Sumanth. It received mixed to positive reviews and she got nominated with SIIMA Award for Best Female Debut – Telugu for her performance.

In 2018, she appeared in her second Telugu film Devadas opposite Nagarjuna. It received positive reviews and was a commercial success. The same year, she appeared in two short films Methi Ke Laddoo and Qaid.

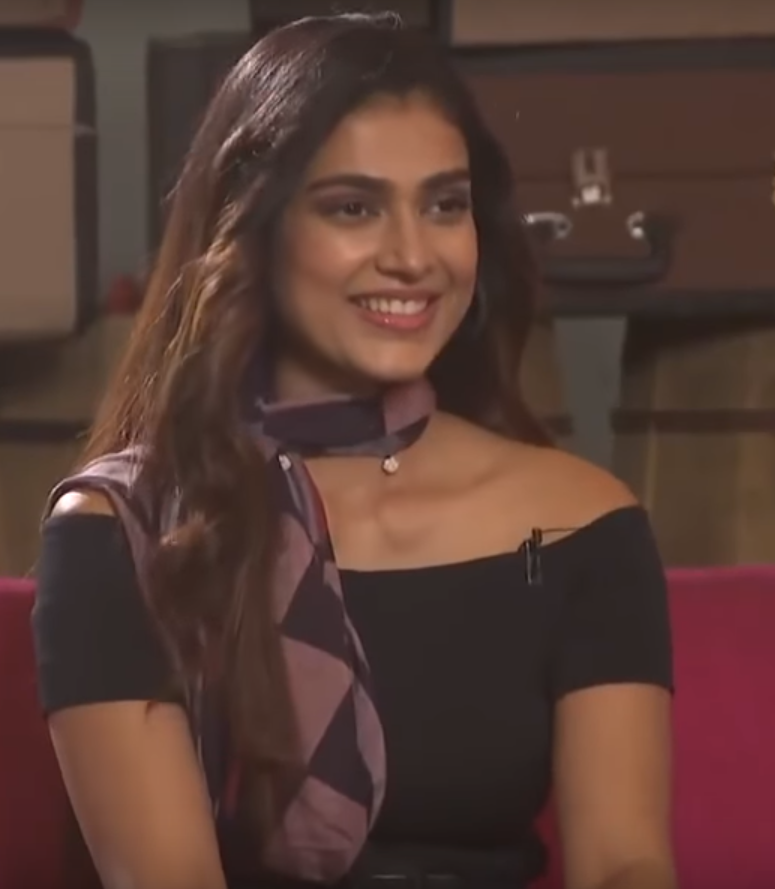
Singh in 2018

Singh marked her Kannada film debut with the 2019 film Pailwaan opposite Sudeep. It was released in 5 languages and was an average hit at the box office.

In 2021, she made her web debut with the Telugu web series Parampara. It premiered on Disney+ Hotstar.

Singh made her Tamil debut in 2022 with the Tamil-Telugu bilingual film, Clap opposite Aadhi Pinisetty. It released on SonyLIV platform. She next appeared in the Tamil film Veerapandiyapuram which received negative reviews.

She next played Ajay Devgn's wife in the Hindi film Runway 34, which marks her second Hindi project. It received mixed to positive reviews. She portrayed a cop in her first Hindi web series Escaype Live on Disney+ Hotstar.

Singh will next appeared in the Hindi web series Rangbaaz: Darr Ki Rajneeti opposite Viineet Kumar. She has also appeared in the Telugu film Meet Cute, an anthology produced by Nani.

== In the media ==
Singh was placed 12th in Bangalore Times' 30 Most Desirable Women list of 2019. Singh is a celebrity endorser for brands and products such as Bru, Complan, Saffola, and Evion among others.

== Filmography ==
=== Films ===
Key
†	Denotes films that have not yet been released

Year	Title	Role	Language	Notes	Ref.
2017	Badrinath Ki Dulhania	Kiran Kakkar	Hindi		
2017	Malli Raava	Anjali	Telugu		
2018	Devadas	Jahnavi	Telugu		
2018	Methi Ke Laddoo	Radhika	Hindi	Short film	
2018	Qaid	Unknown	Hindi	Short film	
2019	Pailwaan	Rukmini	Kannada		
2022	The Turn Ahead	Sophie	Hindi	Short film	
2022	Clap	Mithra	Tamil; Telugu	Bilingual film	
2022	Veerapandiyapuram	Yasodha	Tamil	Bilingual film	
2022	Sivudu	Unknown	Telugu	Bilingual film	
2022	Runway 34	Samaira Khanna	Hindi		
2025	Shashtipoorthi	Janaki	Telugu		

=== Television ===
Year	Title	Role	Language	Notes	Ref.
2012–2013	Na Bole Tum Na Maine Kuch Kaha	Megha Vyas Bhatnagar	Hindi		
2012	Balika Vadhu	Megha Vyas Bhatnagar	Hindi	Special appearance	
2013	Uttaran	Megha Vyas Bhatnagar	Hindi	Special appearance	
2015	Gulmohar Grand	Anahita Mehta Fernandez	Hindi		
2016	Box Cricket League	Contestant	Hindi		
2017	Aye Zindagi	Lawyer	Hindi	Episode 13	
2021–present	Parampara	Rachana	Telugu	2 seasons	
2022	Escaype Live	Devna	Hindi		
2022	Rangbaaz	Sana Baig	Hindi		
2022	Meet Cute	Pooja	Telugu	Segment: "In L(aw)ove"	
2024	Ranneeti: Balakot & Beyond	Richa Singh	Hindi		
2024	Bench Life	Jagadiswari	Telugu		
2025	Khakee: The Bengal Chapter	SIT Officer Aratrika Bhowmick	Hindi		

== Awards and nominations ==
Year	Award	Category	Work	Result	Ref
2012	Gold Awards	Debut in a Lead Role (Female)	Na Bole Tum Na Maine Kuch Kaha	Nominated	
2012	Indian Telly Awards	Fresh New Face – Female	Na Bole Tum Na Maine Kuch Kaha	Won	
2018	7th South Indian International Movie Awards	Best Female Debut – Telugu	Malli Raava	Nominated	
