= Baked (web series) =

Indian fiction web series

- Baked
- Genre: Comedy
- Written by: Vishwajoy Mukherjee; Akash Mehta; Saaduzzaman
- Directed by: Vishwajoy Mukherjee
- Starring: Pranay Manchanda; Shantanu Anam; Manik Papneja; Kriti Vij
- Music by: Akaash Mukherjee; Sahil Dhingra; S. D. Gogol
- Country of origin: India
- Original language: Hindi
- No. of seasons: 3
- No. of episodes: 19

Production
- Executive producers: Prithwish Barman; Sriparna Tikekar; Sanjay Mehta; Tarun Vohra; Sonia Mehta
- Producers: Vishwajoy Mukherjee; Akash Mehta
- Cinematography: Raju Biswas (Season 1, 3); Arkodeb Mukherjee (Season 2)
- Editors: Shweta Rai Chamling; Vishwajoy Mukharjee
- Running time: 21–26 minutes (Season 1); 27–31 minutes (Season 2); 22–27 minutes (Season 3)
- Production companies: Pechkas Pictures (Season 1 & 2); ScoopWhoop Talkies (Season 1 & 2); Dice Media (Season 3)

Original release
- Network: ScoopWhoop (Season 1 & 2); Voot (Season 3)
- Release: 2015 – 2022

Baked is an Indian comedy web series created by Pechkas Pictures and ScoopWhoop Talkies. It chronicles the misadventures of three university flatmates who start a midnight food delivery service. The series is written and produced by Vishwajoy Mukherjee and Akash Mehta and directed by Mukherjee. The show's primary cast includes Pranay Manchanda, Shantanu Anam, Manik Papneja, and Kriti Vij.

The first two seasons were shot in Hindu College and University of Delhi. It was one of the early web series in India and gained immense popularity and became one of the most-watched shows by students in India.

The third part of the series was made into a film. Principal photography began in October 2018 and was wrapped up in February 2019. However, the third part was released as a five-episode series as the third season titled Baked – The Bad Trip. It premiered on 2 May 2022 on Voot.

== Premise ==
The first two seasons revolve around the lives of three friends and roommates—Haris (Pranay Manchanda), Oni (Shantanu Anam), and Body (Manik Papneja)—students at Delhi University who find it hard to make ends meet and start a midnight food delivery service to earn some extra money.

In the third season, Haris, Oni, and Body—now three former college friends—reunite for a road trip to the hills, each with a secret agenda. From getting lost in rural India to being mistaken for drug smugglers and getting arrested, nothing goes according to plan for the boys.

== Cast ==
=== Main ===
- Pranay Manchanda as Mohammad Haris
- Shantanu Anam as Anirban Guha Thakurta / Oni
- Manik Papneja as Shagun / Body
- Kriti Vij as Tara Brara

=== Recurring ===
- Maheep Singh as Inspector Gulaab Singh
- Ashish Dha as Professor Bakshi
- Rahul Tewari as Tewari
- Sidharth Bhardwaj as Coach
- Gopal Verma as Pradhan
- Disha Thakur as Jaspreet, Body's wife
- Mohit Satyanand as Tara's father
- Jayshree Jain as Tara's mother
- Pankaj Sidana as Body's father
- Neeti Kapur as Body's mother
- Karam Vir Lamba as Shantanu
- Chunky Pandey as himself / DJ Danger Guy

== Episodes ==
Season	Episodes	Originally released	Original platform
1	7	May 20, 2015 – July 1, 2015	ScoopWhoop
2	7	December 9, 2016	ScoopWhoop
3	5	May 2, 2022	Voot

=== Season 1 (2015) ===
No.	Title	Original release date
1	"Where the F*** Is My Pizza"	May 20, 2015
2	"College crush"	May 20, 2015
3	"Sorry not Sorry"	May 27, 2015
4	"iPod bhasad"	June 3, 2015
5	"Party's On"	June 10, 2015
6	"No kidding"	June 17, 2015
7	"Wake n bake"	July 1, 2015

=== Season 2 (2016) ===
No.	Title	Original release date
8	"Fashion Society"	December 9, 2016
9	"Korfball"	December 9, 2016
10	"Election Fever"	December 9, 2016
11	"Placebo"	December 9, 2016
12	"Secret Girlfriend"	December 9, 2016
13	"Stockholm Syndrome"	December 9, 2016
14	"Shit Happens!"	December 9, 2016

=== Season 3 (2022) ===
No.	Title	Original release date
15	"The Bad Trip - Part 1"	May 2, 2022
16	"The Bad Trip - Part 2"	May 2, 2022
17	"The Bad Trip - Part 3"	May 2, 2022
18	"The Bad Trip - Part 4"	May 2, 2022
19	"The Bad Trip - Part 5"	May 2, 2022

== Release ==
The first and second seasons were released on ScoopWhoop's website and YouTube channel. The first two episodes of the first season premiered on May 20, 2015, with the remaining five episodes released weekly. The second season premiered on December 9, 2016, with all the episodes.

The third season premiered on May 2, 2022, on Voot.

After the shutdown of Voot in August 2023, all three seasons became available for streaming on JioHotstar.
