= While We Watched =

2022 Indian documentary film by Vinay Shukla

- Official Poster
- Directed by: Vinay Shukla
- Written by: Reshma Ramachandran; Amaan Shaikh; Vinay Shukla; Abhinav Tyagi
- Produced by: Luke W. Moody; Khushboo Ranka; Vinay Shukla
- Starring: Ravish Kumar; Sushil Bahuguna; Deepak Chaubey; Sushil Mohapatra; Swarolipi Sengupta; Saurabh Shukla
- Cinematography: Amaan Shaikh; Vinay Shukla
- Edited by: Abhinav Tyagi
- Music by: Joaquin Garcia
- Production companies: BRITDOC Films; LONO Studio
- Release date: 11 September 2022 (TIFF)
- Running time: 94 minutes
- Country: United Kingdom
- Languages: English, Hindi

While We Watched is a 2022 Indian documentary film by Vinay Shukla, profiling the NDTV news editor Ravish Kumar's resolute journalistic independence in the backdrop of general media bias in India. The film premiered worldwide at the 2022 Toronto International Film Festival, winning the Amplify Voices award. At its Asian premiere in the 27th Busan International Film Festival, it won the Cinephile award and the International Competition at DocPoint Helsinki.

== Background and production ==
Vinay Shukla says he made the film in an attempt to understand the feelings of journalists and anchors like Ravish Kumar as they try to present news and speak truth to power:

"I have stopped watching news and when I talk to my friends in India and other parts of the world, they say the same. I did this to protect my mental health. I asked myself - what do people behind media and news enterprises feel? Do they feel the same loneliness I feel consuming the news? Ravish Kumar is very articulate. And his programmes go against the current news culture in India."

— Vinay Shukla, Frontline

Ravish Kumar agreed to being filmed provided it did not interfere with his work. Vinay Shukla with a three-person crew shot the raw footage for the documentary from 2018 to 2020. Since the documentary was completely unscripted, the narrative was primarily crafted during editing. It took another two years for a final version to emerge, with Shukla crediting Abhinav Tyagi and Reshma Ramachandran for the way the film's narrative is scripted and edited.

The crew shot for eight to nine hours every day starting from noon, accompanying Ravish Kumar from his home to the studio and stopping only when he finally returned at night. Shukla decided early on not to focus on the other prominent journalists in NDTV as his main inspiration was a sense he got that Kumar was at a crossroads in his career, tired of being a hero. Shooting continuously, and without a script over two years, also produced a lot of footage. Shukla had to therefore leave out most of it. He regrets being unable to show the whimsical, humorous side of Kumar as it did not quite fit into the mood the documentary establishes.

== Synopsis ==
While We Watched explores the changes in contemporary Indian mainstream media over the previous decade, through profiling Ravish Kumar, senior executive editor at NDTV, at work in the studio and with his subjects. Indian media ownership, bias and the post-truth, divisive, populist content have led to many mainstream television news channels being labelled Godi media (equivalent to the phrase lapdog media, and incidentally coined by Ravish Kumar).

The documentary follows Kumar as he tries to stick to factual news, criticizing the Indian government and its ecosystem whenever instances of incompetent governance and majoritarian policies emerge. It chronicles the discussions between Kumar and the NDTV team on the events that they need to cover, the preparatory work of fact-checking and witness interviews before Kumar can go live on the primetime show he anchors. It contrasts the coverage by Kumar with that of competing television channels whose anchors are shown hyperbolically conflating criticism of the government's policies with treason and going on diatribes against alleged internal and external enemies of India. It also covers the threats of violence against the NDTV news team, and the financial troubles plaguing media houses that are seen as critics of the BJP, the ruling party in India. Kumar is filmed interacting with his wife and young daughter - particularly having to deal with his daughter's fears for his life - and appearing at public events, alternately being heckled and lauded by audiences. It ends on the highnote of Ravish Kumar winning the Ramon Magsaysay Award in 2019.

While We Watched frequently features scenes of NDTV staff cutting cakes to mark the departure of yet another colleague. Raids by tax authorities, dwindling government advertising revenue, banks refusing to provide loans and threats of violence and even arrest have led to many journalists leaving. Shukla observed that these "cake cuttings" were what convinced him to tell the story and in fact became a leitmotif of the documentary.

== Reception ==
On the review aggregator Rotten Tomatoes website, the film has an approval rating of 91% based on 22 reviews, with an average rating of 7.10/10.

Christopher Cross in Tilt Magazine notes that as the documentary is "[e]dited to keep everything at a breakneck pace and set over a small period of time, Shukla magnifies the rapid rate with which dissent and opposition can be dismantled when those in power feel threatened." He concludes that it "gets at the heart of the media's role in dividing a country and the ways in which audiences let it happen."

Courtney Small in That Shelf says "A riveting work that will have you mourning the slow death of journalism, While We Watched is an urgent reminder that we all have much to lose if we can no longer tell fact from fiction."

Stephen Saito in The Moveable Feast, while pointing out "If While We Watched has a flaw, it isn't one of its own making when the story it tells has become unfortunately all too common around the world", concludes that "Shukla nimbly shows how interconnected these issues (business and political headwinds) all are... when signs of encouragement are few and far between... and the end product suffers as a result, no longer able to hold power to account."

Pat Mullen in POV Magazine believes that "While We Watched smartly captures the state of contemporary news media with a powerful character study of one reporter's unshakable quest to speak the truth." He observes that the film "oddly reflects the slickness of Kumar's competition. The documentary has the sheen of branded content", but concludes "Amid a seas of vitriolic windbags, the portrait of Kumar's unwavering tenacity is most refreshing."

== Awards and nominations ==
Year	Association	Award	Recipients	Result	Ref.
2022	2022 Toronto International Film Festival	Amplify Voices Award	While We Watched	Won	
2022	27th Busan International Film Festival	Busan Cinephile Award	While We Watched	Won	
2023	39th IDA Documentary Awards	Best Feature Documentary	While We Watched	Nominated	
2023	Peabody Awards	Best Documentary Film	While We Watched	Won	
