= ScoopWhoop =

Indian internet media and news company

ScoopWhoop Media
- Company type: Privately held company
- Website type: News & Entertainment
- Available in: English, Hindi
- Founded: 2013; 13 years ago
- Headquarters: New Delhi, India
- Creators: Sattvik Mishra; Rishi Pratim Mukherjee; Sriparna Tikekar; Debarshi Banerjee; Saransh Singh; Suparn Pandey
- Key people: Sattvik Mishra(CEO); Sriparna Tikekar(CCO); Shivam Singh
- Website: www.scoopwhoop.com
- Advertising: Native
- Registration: Optional
- Current status: Active

ScoopWhoop Media is an Indian digital media company based in New Delhi. It operates various online content verticals and serves as a news organisation featuring web series, documentaries and current affairs reporting with a focus on video production and primarily catering to adolescents and young adults. It also features other infotainment and entertainment content.

The company was co-founded by Sattvik Mishra, Rishi Pratim Mukherjee, Sriparna Tikekar, Saransh Singh, Suparn Pandey and Debarshi Banerjee in 2013. Initially started as an Indian viral content generating and sharing website and described as a BuzzFeed clone, it has since expanded into a news media company competing with the likes of The Times Group, Dainik Jagran and NDTV on the digital platform.

== History ==
ScoopWhoop began as an online blog for listicles launched in August 2013 inspired from BuzzFeed. The first post on the blog was a listicle named: "These pictures from a Hindu lesbian wedding would make you all go aww." The idea was conceived by Sattvik Mishra, Sriparna Tikekar and Rishi Pratim Mukherjee. The listicle had generated over half a million views within a day which provided the impetus for the expansion of the blog into a regular project. Saransh Singh and Suparn Pandey were brought into the project around this time.

The five co-founders were all alumni of the Indian Institute of Mass Communication of whom all except Sriparna Tikekar were employees of the designing and online marketing firm Dentsu Webchutney while she herself was an employee of the advertising firm McCann Erickson. The co-founders remained as employees of their respective firms while working on expanding ScoopWhoop as a side project. By January 2014, the WordPress hosted blog had been converted into a website and a viral content producing entertainment company. Debarshi Banerjee who is also credited as a co-founder was brought in for his technological expertise and became the Chief Technology Officer of the company.

In early 2014, the editor-in-chief of BuzzFeed, Ben Smith came into contact with the co-founders and offered them to work in partnership with BuzzFeed however the offer wasn't followed up by either party. Subsequently, Times Internet also offered to acquire ScoopWhoop but the offer was rejected by the co-founders of ScoopWhoop. Siddharth Rao, the CEO of Dentsu Webchutney eventually discovered the project and became one of the first investors along with the journalist Harsh Chawla, the first CEO of Network18 and the founder of Firstpost who was also an early investor of Dentsu Webchutney.

In November 2014, Bharti Softbank – the joint venture between Bharti Enterprises and SoftBank Group invested ₹10 crore (US$1.0 million) in the company and acquired 36.5% of its shareholding. The valuation of the company was estimated to be approximately ₹40 crore (US$4.2 million) at the time. According to The Caravan, the investment turned the co-founders of the company into overnight millionaires.

In February 2015, ScoopWhoop began its venture into news media and hired the journalist Anuja Jairan as the editor-in-chief who had previously been an employee of Reuters and Hindustan Times. Subsequently, in November 2015, the company again raised investments worth US$4 million from the venture capital firm Kalaari Capital to expand its editorial and video division. Since then it has entered into partnerships with Newslaundry and TikTok for the production of documentaries and distribution of their content respectively.

== Content ==
ScoopWhoop produces digital content across a variety of topics and interests; it includes current affairs reporting, interviews, web series, documentaries, etc. with a focus on producing video content as well as listicles, quizzes, memes and other entertainment and lifestyle content. The company owns and operates five digital properties for the publication of its content namely; ScoopWhoop.com, ScoopWhoop Hindi, Vagabomb, ScoopWhoop Unscripted and OkTested. In a 2015 article of Quartz India, ScoopWhoop was described as an outlet that was trying to become the Indian version of BuzzFeed and Vox Media with a slice of Vice Media.

While initially the company had started as a producer of listicles and other viral content; according to the Columbia Journalism Review in late 2016, ScoopWhoop "had since moved into the broader terrain of news." It was identified as one of several independent and recently founded internet-based media platforms – a group that also included Scroll.in, Newslaundry, The News Minute, The Quint and The Wire – that were attempting to challenge the dominance of India's traditional print and television news companies and their online offshoots. The Business Standard described ScoopWhoop as an outlet that disseminates of news in non traditional formats around that time.

=== ScoopWhoop.com ===
ScoopWhoop.com is the primary website of the company which was launched with the founding of ScoopWhoop as a digital media company. It is an English language general news and entertainment website. The website also features various web series and documentaries produced by ScoopWhoop. The division is currently headed by Shivam Singh. ScoopWhoop is currently collaborating with Newslaundry to produce the documentary series called Chase. The series is focused towards producing seasons on various news and current affairs and is directed by the journalist Avalok Langer.

=== ScoopWhoop Hindi ===
ScoopWhoop Hindi is a website which is the Hindi language edition of ScoopWhoop for viral news and entertainment content. It was launched under the name Gazab Post in 2015 and renamed to ScoopWhoop Hindi in June 2018.

=== Vagabomb ===
Vagabomb is a website focused on current affairs, lifestyle and other contemporary writing catering to women. It was launched by ScoopWhoop in 2015.

=== ScoopWhoop Unscripted ===
ScoopWhoop Unscripted is a YouTube channel launched by ScoopWhoop and hosted by Samdish Bhatia, with its own production team and which solely hosts unscripted current affairs and entertainment content. The channel hosts the Off the Record web series which features interviews with various notable personalities, including the politician Manoj Tiwari, activist Yogendra Yadav, journalist Ravish Kumar, among others. In October 2021, Bhatia announced that he was resigning from the company.

=== Ok Tested ===
Ok Tested is a YouTube channel launched in 2017 by ScoopWhoop which produces lifestyle and entertainment content.

== Readership ==
In late 2016, the monthly unique readership of ScoopWhoop across all its three websites was estimated to be 30 million and their monthly views across all its internet assets including channels on social media platforms was estimated to be 225 million.

== Controversies ==
In April 2017, ScoopWhoop co-founder Suparn Pandey was accused by an executive of sexual assault and misbehavior during the 2 years she worked with ScoopWhoop.

In March 2018 ScoopWhoop personnel were found to be involved in negotiations for a political campaign by investigative media portal Cobrapost.

In February 2022, a former ScoopWhoop employee, Samdish Bhatia accused the founder and CEO Sattvik Mishra and his wife of sexual harassment and assault, filing an FIR against him. Subsequently, the court refused to grant an interim injunction sought by Mishra in connection with this case.
