= Rasbhari =

2020 Indian comedy television series

- Promotional poster
- Created by: Shantanu Shrivastav; Tanveer Bookwala
- Written by: Shantanu Srivastava
- Directed by: Nikhil Nagesh Bhat
- Starring: Swara Bhaskar; Ayushman Saxena
- Music by: Pranaay
- Opening theme: "Rasbhari" by Chirrantan Bhatt
- Country of origin: India
- Original languages: Hindi; English
- No. of seasons: 1
- No. of episodes: 8

Production
- Executive producer: Dheeman Agarwala
- Producers: Sameer Nair; Deepak Segal
- Cinematography: Piyush Puty
- Editor: Shadab Khan
- Camera setup: Single-camera
- Running time: 20- 25 Minute
- Production companies: Applause Entertainment; A Ding Entertainment

Original release
- Network: Amazon Video
- Release: 25 June 2020

Rasbhari is an Indian Hindi-language psychological comedy miniseries starring Swara Bhaskar in triple roles, while Ayushman Saxena, Neelu Kohli and Aruna Soni in supporting roles. It is premiered on Amazon Prime 25 June 2020. The series was shot in Bijnor

== Premise ==
Rasbhari captures the small-town milieu of Meerut perfectly. English teacher Shanu (Swara) comes to live in Meerut with her husband and overnight becomes the fantasy of her students and neighbours. Comfortable with her beauty and sexuality, she is branded a ‘husband snatcher’ by the women of the town while the men cannot stop thinking about her.

== Cast ==
- Swara Bhaskar as Rasbhari/Shanu Madam/Niharikaa
- Ayushmaan Saxena as Nand Kishore Tyagi
- Rashmi Agdekar as Priyanka
- Praduman Singh as Naveen
- Neelu Kohli as Pushpa
- Sunny Hinduja as Pappu Tiwari
- Akshay Suri as Vipul
- Chittaranjan Tripathi as Tyagi
- Akshay Batchu as Bhalla
- Aruna Soni as Snehalata

== Episodes ==
Season	Episodes	Originally released
1	8	June 25, 2020

No.	Title	Directed by	Written by	Original release date
1	"Mrs. Ravan ka Maayka"	Nikhil Nagesh Bhat	Shantanu Shrivastav	25 June 2020
2	"Jasoosi Ki Duniya"	Nikhil Nagesh Bhat	Shantanu Shrivastav	25 June 2020
3	"English Speaking Fast Fast"	Nikhil Nagesh Bhat	Shantanu Shrivastav	25 June 2020
4	"Madam Ke Husband Bhole Hai"	Nikhil Nagesh Bhat	Shantanu Shrivastav	25 June 2020
5	"Bhootni Ke Jalwe"	Nikhil Nagesh Bhat	Shantanu Shrivastav	25 June 2020
6	"Lag Gayi... Lottery"	Nikhil Nagesh Bhat	Shantanu Shrivastav	25 June 2020
7	"Pushpa Ka Plan"	Nikhil Nagesh Bhat	Shantanu Shrivastav	25 June 2020
8	"Climax"	Nikhil Nagesh Bhat	Shantanu Shrivastav	25 June 2020
