= Parampara (Indian TV series) =

Indian crime drama streaming television series

- Genre: Political; Crime drama
- Written by: Hari Yelleti
- Screenplay by: Hari Yelleti; Durga Shankar Kesanakurthi; V. Srinivasa Rao; Penubothu Venkat; I. Pradeep Kumar Reddy
- Directed by: Krishna Vijay L.; Viswanath Arigela; Hari Yelleti
- Starring: Jagapathi Babu; Sarath Kumar; Naveen Chandra; Kasthuri Shankar; Ishaan; Aakanksha Singh; Naina Ganguly
- Voices of: Vedala Hemachandra; Sowmya Sharma
- Composer: Naresh Kumaran
- Country of origin: India
- Original language: Telugu
- No. of seasons: 2
- No. of episodes: 12

Production
- Executive producers: Kishore Kedari; Naga Nandini Puli
- Producers: Shobu Yarlagadda; Prasad Devineni
- Production location: India
- Cinematography: S. V. Vishweshwar
- Editor: Tammiraju
- Running time: 30–59 min
- Production company: Arka Media Works

Original release
- Network: Disney+ Hotstar
- Release: 24 December 2021 – present

Parampara (transl. Tradition) is an Indian Telugu-language crime drama television series, starring Jagapathi Babu, Sarath Kumar, Naveen Chandra, Ishaan and Aakanksha Singh in the lead roles. The series premiered on Disney+ Hotstar on 24 December 2021. Season 2 of the series premiered on 21 July 2022.

== Cast ==
- Jagapathi Babu as Chintalapudi Mohan Rao Naidu
  - Sritej as young Mohan Rao
- Sarath Kumar as Chintalapudi Nagendra Naidu
  - Prawin Yendamuri as young Naidu
- Naveen Chandra as Chintalapudi Gopi Naidu, Mohan Rao's son and Nagendra's nephew
- Ishan as Chintalapudi Suresh Naidu, Nagendra's son and Mohan Rao's nephew
- Aakanksha Singh as Rachana
- Naina Ganguly as Jenny
- Aamani as Bhanumati
- Kasthuri as Indira
- Murali Mohan as Chintalapudi Veera Naidu
- Thotapalli Madhu as Gangaraju
- Surya Bhagvandas as Bharani
- Jogi Brothers as Theepi Seenu & Pulupu Seenu
- Arjun Ambati as Harsha
- Kedar Shankar as Krishna Prasad
- Kamalakar as Upendra
- Teja as SP Parasuram
- Praveena as Kamala
- Shreya Navile as Aruna
- Rama Devi as Yamuna

Season 2

- Mayank Parakh as Omar
- Divi Vadthya as Tara

== Episodes ==
Series	Episodes	Originally released	
Series	Episodes	First released	Last released
1	7	24 December 2021	TBA
2	5	21 July 2022	9

=== Season 1 (2021) ===
No.	Title	Directed by	Written by	Original release date
1	"Aarambam"	Krishna Vijay L.	Hari Yelleti	24 December 2021
2	"Moolam"	Viswanath Arigela	Hari Yelleti	24 December 2021
3	"Virodhamm"	Krishna Vijay L. & Hari Yelleti	Hari Yelleti	24 December 2021
4	"Vyuham"	Krishna Vijay L. & Viswanath Arigela	Hari Yelleti	24 December 2021
5	"Chaturam"	Krishna Vijay L. & Viswanath Arigela	Hari Yelleti	24 December 2021
6	"Gatham"	Krishna Vijay L. & Viswanath Arigela	Hari Yelleti	24 December 2021
7	"Valayam"	Krishna Vijay L. & Viswanath Arigela	Hari Yelleti	24 December 2021

=== Season 2 (2022) ===
No.	Title	Directed by	Written by	Original release date
1	"Gamanam"	Krishna Vijay L. & Viswanath Arigela	Hari Yelleti	21 July 2022
2	"Kriya"	Krishna Vijay L. & Viswanath Arigela	Hari Yelleti	21 July 2022
3	"Sthaanam"	Krishna Vijay L. & Viswanath Arigela	Hari Yelleti	21 July 2022
4	"Chathurangam"	Krishna Vijay L. & Viswanath Arigela	Hari Yelleti	21 July 2022
5	"Moolyam"	Krishna Vijay L. & Viswanath Arigela	Hari Yelleti	21 July 2022

== Production ==
In December 2020, it was reported that Kannada actor Ishaan was cast in a leading role alongside Sarath Kumar. In August 2021, it was revealed that Jagapathi Babu, Naveen Chandra and Aakanksha Singh were cast in lead roles. The series was initially titled Gharshana but was later renamed as Parampara.

== Release ==
Parampara premiered on Disney+ Hotstar on 24 December 2021. The series was renewed for a new season in June 2022. The second season premiered on 21 July 2022.

=== Promotion ===
In December 2021, the character teasers of the show were released by Disney+ Hotstar. The official trailer for the series premiered on 15 December 2021.

== Reception ==
=== Season 1 ===
Thadhagath Pathi writing for The Times of India, stated that Parampara tries to depict the family factions with detailed and intense characters, with directors Krishna Vijay and Viswanath Arigela deserving credit for the same. No two characters show hate towards each other but everyone is aware of their true feelings, and that’s a win for this privileged family drama and rated 2.5 out of 5.

=== Season 2 ===
Citing it as "a racier follow-up" Sangeetha Devi Dundoo of The Hindu wrote that "The twists and turns in Parampara are staple tropes of mainstreamcinema. A long-form series can lend itself to newer and more intriguing subplots rather than offering more of the same, predictable storylines".

Arvind V of Pinkvilla gave a rating of 2 out of 5 and praised the performances of Chandra and Sarathkumar. Echoing the same, 123Telugu gave a rating of 2.75 out of 5 and stated: "Parampara S2 has scope for good drama and engaging screenplay but is brought down by uneven sequences. The writing needs to be blamed for making it underwhelming".

Paul Nicodemus of The Times of India gave 2.5 out of 5 stars and wrote "Parampara Season 2 has swag, emotion and action but unnecessarily gets undone by overbearing ‘indebted’ rhetoric."

Satya Pulagam writing for ABP News stated "The second season seems to be better than the first season, there are some interesting political and family moments and drama."
