= The Pickup Artist (2019 film) =

Indian thriller film

- Promotional poster
- Directed by: Rohit Arora
- Written by: Rohit Arora
- Screenplay by: Rohit Arora; Pankaj Uniyal
- Produced by: Rohit Arora; Pankaj Uniyal
- Starring: Dev Chauhan; Vijay Kumar Dogra; Pankaj Uniyal; Anahita Bhooshan
- Cinematography: Rohit Arora
- Music by: Andrew Sloman; Bonnie Chakraborty
- Production company: Roar Picture Company
- Distributed by: PVR Cinemas; MX Player
- Release dates: March 2019 (WorldFest-Houston); 16 October 2020 (Theatrical release)
- Running time: 111 minutes
- Country: India
- Language: Hindi

The Pickup Artist is a 2019 Indian Hindi-language thriller film, directed by Rohit Arora. The film stars Dev Chauhan, Vijay Kumar Dogra, Pankaj Uniyal and Anahita Bhooshan as lead characters. The music of the film is done by Bonnie Chakraborty and co-produced by Rohit Arora and Pankaj Uniyal, under the Banner of Roar Picture Company.

The film premiered at the 2019 WorldFest-Houston International Film Festival and was released in theatres on 16 October, 2020.

== Plot ==
The film revolves around the perception of a Psycho Killer. It is based on the sequence of a crime that occurs in the metro city of Delhi. A girl goes missing and many incidents are inter-linked with each other. The case is then handed over to a maniac policeman, named Tiger Tiwari (Dev Chauhan). Its story revolves around a matter of missing girls in Delhi and a passionate policeman.

== Cast ==
- Siddharth Bhardwaj as Siddharth Bharadwaj
- Anahita Bhooshan as Chahat
- Aanchal Chauhan as Mukti
- Dev Chauhan as Tiger Tiwari
- Gandharv Dewan as Shyam
- Vijay Kumar Dogra as Sharmaji
- Dhruv Khurana as Sid
- Jasneet Kooner as Elena
- Vaibhav Kumar as Kanhaiya
- Saurabh Madaan
- Lokesh Mittal as Lalaram
- Samapti Patra as Aastha
- Smriti Sahni as Sapna
- Vivek Sinha as Crazy Baba
- Akanksha Tyagi
- Saasha Aery
- Pankaj Uniyal as Pankaj

== Marketing and release ==
The Pickup Artist was released in theatres on 16 October, 2020. It is one of the first films to release in Indian cinemas, as theatres reopened after seven months of lockdown due to the COVID-19 pandemic in India. The film was released on the OTT platform MX Player on 28 January, 2021.

== Reception ==
The Times of India mentions a 4.4 out of 5 ratings.

== Awards and recognition ==
The film was selected to be a part of WorldFest-Houston International Film Festival, the world's oldest independent film festival, in March 2019. The Pickup Artist won two Gold Remi Awards at the 2019 WorldFest-Houston.

In February 2019, the film was selected to be a part of the East x Northeast International Film Festival in New York. It was nominated for Best Feature Film at the East X Northeast. It was the first Indian film to be selected in the Cinefantasy International Fantastic Film Festival in Brazil.

== See also ==
- List of Bollywood films of 2019
