= List of South Korean films of 1952 =

This is a list of films produced in South Korea in 1952.

Released	English title	Korean title	Director	Cast	Genre	Notes
1952
10 May	Seongbulsa	성불사	Yun Bong-chun		Drama, Enlightenment	
15 July	The Evil Night	악야	Shin Sang-ok		Drama	
1 August	The Night of Horror	공포의 밤	Son Jun		Gangster, Crime	
15 October	The Street of Sun	태양의 거리	Min Kyoung-sik		Drama, Enlightenment	
20 October	A Veiled Lady	베일부인	Eo Yak-seon		Melodrama	
15 November	Nakdong River	낙동강	Jeon Chang-keun		Drama, Enlightenment	
