= The Free Voice =

2019 non-fiction book

The Free Voice: On Democracy, Culture And The Nation
- First edition
- Author: Ravish Kumar
- Translators: Chitra Padmanabhan, Anurag Basnet, Ravi Singh
- Language: English
- Published: 27 February 2018
- Publisher: Speaking Tiger Books
- Publication place: India
- ISBN: 9389231191

The Free Voice: On Democracy, Culture And The Nation is a non-fiction book written by Ramon Magsaysay Award-winning journalist Ravish Kumar on India's democracy and its backsliding under Prime Minister Narendra Modi. (Note: Sources describing that India has experienced a backslide in democracy:)

A revised and updated edition was released in August 2019 with a new Introduction, and two additional essays examining the developments since the 2019 Indian general election.
