= Bholaa =

2023 Indian film by Ajay Devgn

- Theatrical release poster
- Directed by: Ajay Devgn
- Written by: Aamil Keeyan Khan; Ankush Singh; Sandeep Kewlani; Shridhar Dubey
- Story by: Lokesh Kanagaraj
- Based on: Kaithi (2019) by Lokesh Kanagaraj
- Produced by: Ajay Devgn; Bhushan Kumar; Krishan Kumar; S. R. Prakashbabu; S. R. Prabhu; Reliance Entertainment
- Starring: Ajay Devgn; Tabu; Sanjay Mishra; Deepak Dobriyal; Gajraj Rao; Vineet Kumar
- Cinematography: Aseem Bajaj
- Edited by: Dharmendra Sharma
- Music by: Ravi Basrur
- Production companies: T-Series Films; Devgn Films; Reliance Entertainment; Dream Warrior Pictures
- Distributed by: Panorama Studios; PVR Pictures (Worldwide)
- Release date: 30 March 2023
- Running time: 144 minutes
- Country: India
- Language: Hindi
- Budget: ₹100 crore
- Box office: est. ₹111.64 crore

Bholaa is a 2023 Indian Hindi-language action thriller film directed by Ajay Devgn and produced by Devgn Films, Reliance Entertainment, T-Series Films and Dream Warrior Pictures. It is a remake of the 2019 Tamil film Kaithi and stars Devgn alongside Tabu, Deepak Dobriyal, Sanjay Mishra, Gajraj Rao and Vineet Kumar. The music was composed by Ravi Basrur, while cinematography and editing were handled by Aseem Bajaj and Dharmendra Sharma.

Principal photography took place from January 2022 to January 2023 in Mumbai, Hyderabad, Varanasi and Chennai.

Bholaa was released on 30 March 2023 to mixed reviews from critics and grossed ₹111 crore (US$12 million) worldwide.

== Plot ==
SP Diana Joseph captures members of the Sikka Gang and confiscates a haul of cocaine worth ₹1,000 crore. Abbas Ali, an undercover officer known as Raunak, has joined Ashwathama "Ashu", the co-leader of the Sikka Gang. Raunak gives information about Ashu to Diana, while Ashu seeks help from corrupt NCB officer Devraj Subramaniam, who instructs another officer Deep Singh to add rohypnol, known for its use as a date rape drug, to drinks made for cops at the farewell party of IG Jayant Malik. Diana does not partake due to medication, but everyone else falls unconscious.

A prisoner named Bholaa has been released from prison and Diana tries to convince him to drive a truck taking the sedated cops to the hospital and later on to Laalganj police station. Although reluctant at first, Bholaa agrees. Meanwhile, Ashu hires a bounty on Diana and the rest of her police force. As Diana, Bholaa and sidekick Kadchi drive to the hospital, they are attacked by various gangs. Deep Singh, who has hidden with the sedated officers, provides them with the location updates. A cat-and-mouse game ensues in which Bholaa kills the goons. Ashu also sends his gang to attack the police station and to free his brother Nithari, who was caught with the cocaine.

Constable Angad Yadav, who was recently transferred to Laalganj police station, gets assigned by Diana to defend the station. When Ashu arrives with his gang, they try to breach the station, which is barricaded by Yadav and some students. Diana is nearly tricked into ordering the release of the prisoners, but she realises that it was a trap set by Nithari. Ashu manages to get inside the police station, but Yadav and the students manage to arrest him. One of the student Chetan gets strangled to death by Ashu's gang and Yadav kills Ashu. Diana contacts medics to provide an emergency ambulance at a temple of Lord Shiva.

As they wait, Bholaa narrates his past in which he was a notorious gangster in UP and fell in love with a Dr. Swara. Before their marriage, Bholaa gave up his gangster life, but Swara was killed by a ruthless gang leader called Chomu Singh. Before dying, Swara gave birth to their daughter Jyoti, but Bholaa was separated from her after receiving a long-term prison sentence. Diana shares her story about how she lost her unborn child when she was pregnant. An ambulance finally arrives and takes the sedated officers to the hospital. After this, Ashu's henchman Bhoora also arrives. Before Bholaa is able to fight, Deep Singh stabs him and Bholaa is brutally injured.

Diana and Kadchi are taken away and Abbas is killed after his identity is exposed. Bholaa regains consciousness and single-handedly kills the whole gang, including Deep Singh, using the Trishul. After this, Bholaa chases after Bhoraa, rescuing Diana and killing Bhoraa. After driving all night, Bholaa, Kadchi and Diana arrive in the station using a secret passage and help the students and Yadav to escape safely. Diana burns the cocaine and after Ashu's re-inforced gang finally breaches the station, Bholaa destroys them using a M134 Minigun. Nithari dies of shock after learning about Bholaa and Devraj Subramaniam shoots himself after knowing that Bholaa was behind everything. Bholaa reunites with Jyoti and they drive off in the truck with Kadchi and a puppy.

In the mid-credits scene, Chomu Singh learns about Bholaa's release from prison and sets out to hunt him down.

== Cast ==
- Ajay Devgn as Bholaa, a prisoner, Dr. Swara's husband and Jyoti's father
- Tabu as SP Diana Joseph
- Sanjay Mishra as Constable Angad Yadav
- Deepak Dobriyal as Ashwathama 'Ashu', Nithari's younger brother
- Gajraj Rao as Devraj Subramaniam
- Vineet Kumar as Nithari, Ashu's elder brother
- Kiran Kumar as IG Jayant Malik
- Makarand Deshpande as a prisoner
- Arpit Ranka as Bhoora
- Amir Khan as Kadchi, truck partner
- Khan Jahangir Khan as Sarangi
- Lokesh Mittal as Deep Singh, police officer
- Hirva Trivedi as Jyoti, Bholaa's daughter
- Arzoo Soni as Rachna
- Tarun Gahlot as Abbas Ali aka Raunak
- Deepali Gautam as Naina
- Mukund Ramesh Pal as Baingan
- Chetan Sharma as Chetan aka Chashmish
- Priyank Tiwary as Shekhar
- Amit Pandey as Nithari's Man
- Bachchan Pachera as Orphanage guard
- Jyoti Gauba as Dr. Surbhi
- Akhilesh Mishra as Arpit Mishra
- Sima Pari as Orphanage teacher
- Yuri Suri as a harasser

Cameo appearance

- Abhishek Bachchan as Chomu Singh, Bholaa's rival
- Amala Paul as Dr. Swara, Bholaa's wife and Jyoti's mother
- Raai Laxmi as a bar dancer in the item song "Paan Dukaniya"

== Production ==
Principal photography for the film commenced on 13 January 2022. Filming took place in Hyderabad, Madh Island, Kharghar, Mumbai and Varanasi. The entire filming for Bholaa was wrapped up on 6 January 2023.

== Soundtrack ==
Bholaa

Soundtrack album by Ravi Basrur
- Released: 9 April 2023
- Recorded: 2021–22
- Genre: Feature film soundtrack
- Length: 23:00
- Labels: T-Series; Saregama (1 song)

Official audio
- Bholaa (Audio Jukebox) on YouTube

The music of the film is composed by Ravi Basrur while lyrics are written by Irshad Kamil. The first single titled "Nazar Lag Jayegi" was released on 20 February 2023. The second single titled "Aadha Main Aadhi Vo" was released on 15 March 2023. The third single titled "Paan Dukaniya" was released on 20 March 2023. The fourth single titled "Dil Hai Bholaa" was released on 24 March 2023. The fifth single titled "Aaraaro Aararo" was released on 6 April 2023.

Track listing
No.	Title	Singer(s)	Length
1.	"Nazar Lag Jayegi"	Javed Ali	3:56
2.	"Aadha Main Aadhi Vo"	B Praak	6:18
3.	"Paan Dukaniya"	Kanika Kapoor, Swaroop Khan	3:41
4.	"Dil Hai Bholaa"	Amit Mishra	4:46
5.	"Aaraaro Aararo"	Hariharan	4:18
Total length:			23:00

== Release ==
=== Theatrical ===
Bholaa was released theatrically on 30 March 2023 in 2D, 3D, IMAX 3D, 4DX and ICE 3D formats worldwide.

=== Home media ===
The digital streaming rights were acquired by Amazon Prime Video for ₹30–40 crore, while the satellite rights were sold to Zee Cinema. The film was premiered on Amazon Prime Video on 25 May 2023.

=== Distribution ===
It was distributed worldwide by Panorama Studios and PVR Pictures.

== Reception ==
=== Box office ===
The film grossed ₹11.20 crore on its first day. On the second day the film collected only ₹6 crore. While Day 3 and Day 4 collections were ₹11 crore and ₹12.20 crore respectively. The film grossed ₹54.80 in its first week of release. As of 4 May 2023 it has grossed ₹111.64 crore worldwide.

=== Critical response ===
On the review aggregator website Rotten Tomatoes, 42% of 12 critics' reviews are positive, with an average rating of 5.8/10.

Taran Adarsh of Bollywood Hungama gave 3.5/5 stars and wrote "Bholaa is a mass-appealing film with scale, grandeur, breathtaking action, and Ajay Devgn and Tabu's mind-blowing performances as its USP". Harshada Rege of The Times of India gave 3.5/5 stars and wrote "Bholaa packs in quite a punch with his strength, grit and charisma".

Roktim Rajpal of India Today gave 3/5 stars and wrote "Bholaa is a treat for Ajay Devgn’s fans. It has everything, right from action scenes to punch dialogues, that one would expect from a big-screen spectacle meant for the mass audience". Shubhra Gupta of The Indian Express gave 3/5 stars and wrote "Ajay Devgn-Tabu's all-out action film is not for the faint-hearted but it is bang for your buck". Rishil Jogani of Pinkvilla gave 3/5 stars and wrote "Bholaa primarily rides on well-designed action scenes directed tactfully by Ajay Devgn and his team".

Monika Rawal Kukreja of the Hindustan Times wrote "Bholaa can sure be touted to be that typical mass entertainer with action that is totally paisa vasool, but again, we need to see something beyond just the heroic deeds". Udita Jhunjhunwala of Mint wrote "‘Bholaa’ is a 3D-reimagining of the heavy-duty action film, ‘Kaithi’, with low-grade computer graphics and a breathless body count. The finale has tonal and action design references that give a World War Z meets Mad Max: Fury Road feel".

== Sequel and Legal troubles ==
A sequel titled Bholaa 2 has been confirmed by Devgn with Abhishek Bachchan playing Bholaa's rival Chomu Singh, as shown in the film's mid-credits scene. however in 2026, Dream Warrior Pictures filed case against Devgan films.
