= Ekkees Tareekh Shubh Muhurat =

- Directed by: Pavan Kumar
- Written by: Pavan Kumar
- Produced by: Mukesh Jodhani; Rajesh Jodhani
- Starring: Sanjay Mishra; Brijendra Kala
- Cinematography: Sudhir Chandra
- Edited by: Suraj Gunjal
- Music by: Vickey Prasad
- Release date: 2 November 2018
- Running time: 100 minutes
- Country: India
- Language: Hindi

Ekkees Tareekh Shubh Muhurat is directed by Pavan Kumar. Sanjay Mishra is playing a character of 55-year-old man Pandit Girdhari Laal Sharma.

== Plot ==
Girdhari Lal Sharma is a son of a priest living in Mathura, who has no interest in carrying on his father's legacy. He is interested in becoming a storyteller of mythological epics, but no one is interested in his work. He has a daughter, Radha, and son, Banwari, both of marriageable age. Radha is a school teacher and in a relationship with a Gopal who comes from a well-to-do family. The only hurdle in their marriage is her father's inability to arrange enough funds for her marriage. After a long argument with her in-laws over the date, it is decided that the marriage cannot be postponed any further and has to happen on the 21st of this month, hence the name of the film ekkees (21) tareekh (date).

Now that the date is set, Girdhari has no choice but to arrange for the funds. He meets his relatives, friends & acquaintances but doesn't get any assistance. His friend Bulaki suggests that the only way is that he should marry off his son Banwari who has just completed his exams for IAS (Indian Administrative Service) and has good chances of clearing the exam. Most people would pay a hefty dowry for such a prospect. However, due to the marriage deadline, Banwari has to do this before his results are out which is a tricky situation. Banwari agrees to this as he wishes to see his sister happy. They meet a few prospects, but it something or the other is always amiss. Finally, Girdhari comes across a matrimonial ad & call Pankhuri's mother Indrani who live in Kolkatta. Indrani agrees to visit Mathura with her daughter.

Banwari is smitten by Pankhuri and it seems that the relationship has good prospects. Indrani and Girdhari have a few drinks and then she reveals that Pankhuri is a widow and agrees to pay 25 Lakhs in dowry. Girdhari is taken aback as he would not want to marry his son to a widow which is considered as a bad omen. He nevertheless agrees due to looming pressure of Radha's marriage. It is decided that both weddings would take place at the same time.

On the day of the wedding, the Banwari's results are announced and he has cleared the IAS exams. Girdhari becomes greedy and hatches a plan. He asks a local muscleman Robdar to abduct his son for a few hours at the time of the wedding so that he would get along with the wedding of his daughter & then call-off the wedding of his son somehow. As fate would have happened Robdar has to kidnap Gopal he tries to fight off the kidnap attempt. Girdhari and Radha's father-in-law of visit the local police station for help, the police officer scoffs them off saying the guys must have run away with someone else & would return after some time. Girdhari asks Radha's father-in-law to go home and inform that police is taking some action so that there is some calm at home meanwhile, he meets Robdar.

Robdar refuses to let off his son and son-in-law (as per their original agreement) because now is also aware that his son has cleared the exam and intends to marry his daughter to Banwari. When Girdhari refuses, Robdar ties him up as well and sends his daughter to seduce Banwari. Next day secretary of local Politician visits Girdhari's home to wish Banwari on his success. When he is informed of the abduction he takes Girdhari's father to the politician who then calls the police officer who had earlier rejected his complaint. The police officer now gets in action and visits Robdar who is the usual suspect for kidnapping. When he learns that Banwari has cleared IAS exam, he threatens Robdar and offers Girdhari his daughter in marriage. Next day, the politician visits Robdar, he too threatens Girdhari to marry his niece with Banwari. Now with all the threats, Girdhari hatches a plan. He informs Robdar that Banwari has agreed to marry his daughter after and days of everyone convincing him. Now to take care of police officer and politician all he has to do is put his daughter in place of politician's niece as the face of the bride is covered by the bridal attire. Robdar agrees and sets everyone free. Girdhari then meets the police officer saying the same thing & gives him a letter which is part of his plan. The marriage is set and Radha takes each of the prospective brides inside her room on the pretext of dressing them with bridal attire & ties them up with Pankhuri's assistance. Eventually, Radha's marriage is done.

Everyone smells something fishy and they discover that each of the prospective brides is tied up. Before any ruckus is created the police officer intervenes and reads out the letter which was earlier given to him by Girdhari where he has confessed to his crimes. Girdhari and Robdar are arrested for kidnapping and before leaving blesses Pankhuri and Banwari (consenting to their marriage). In prison, Girdhari finally realises his dream of storytelling & where the prisoners are listening to him ardently.

== Cast ==
- Sanjay Mishra as Girdhari Lal Sharma aka Pandit Ji
- Brijendra Kala as Bulaki
- Mukesh Tiwari as Robdar
- Sitaram Panchal
- Bhagwan Tiwari as Daroga Samajhdar Singh
- Kajal Jain as Radha
- Chandrachoor Rai as Banwari
- Mahesh Sharma as Gopal
- Kamalika Banerjee as Indrani
- Meena Nathani as Prabha
- Banwari Lal Jhol as Brij Kishore
- Anjanikumar Khanna as Vidhayak
- Riya Chanda as Pankhuri
- Bhawna Chaudhary as Munni
- Harshit as Diya
- Levi Avelino as Kinrin
