= Postcode Lottery Group =

Dutch international social enterprise

The Postcode Lottery Group
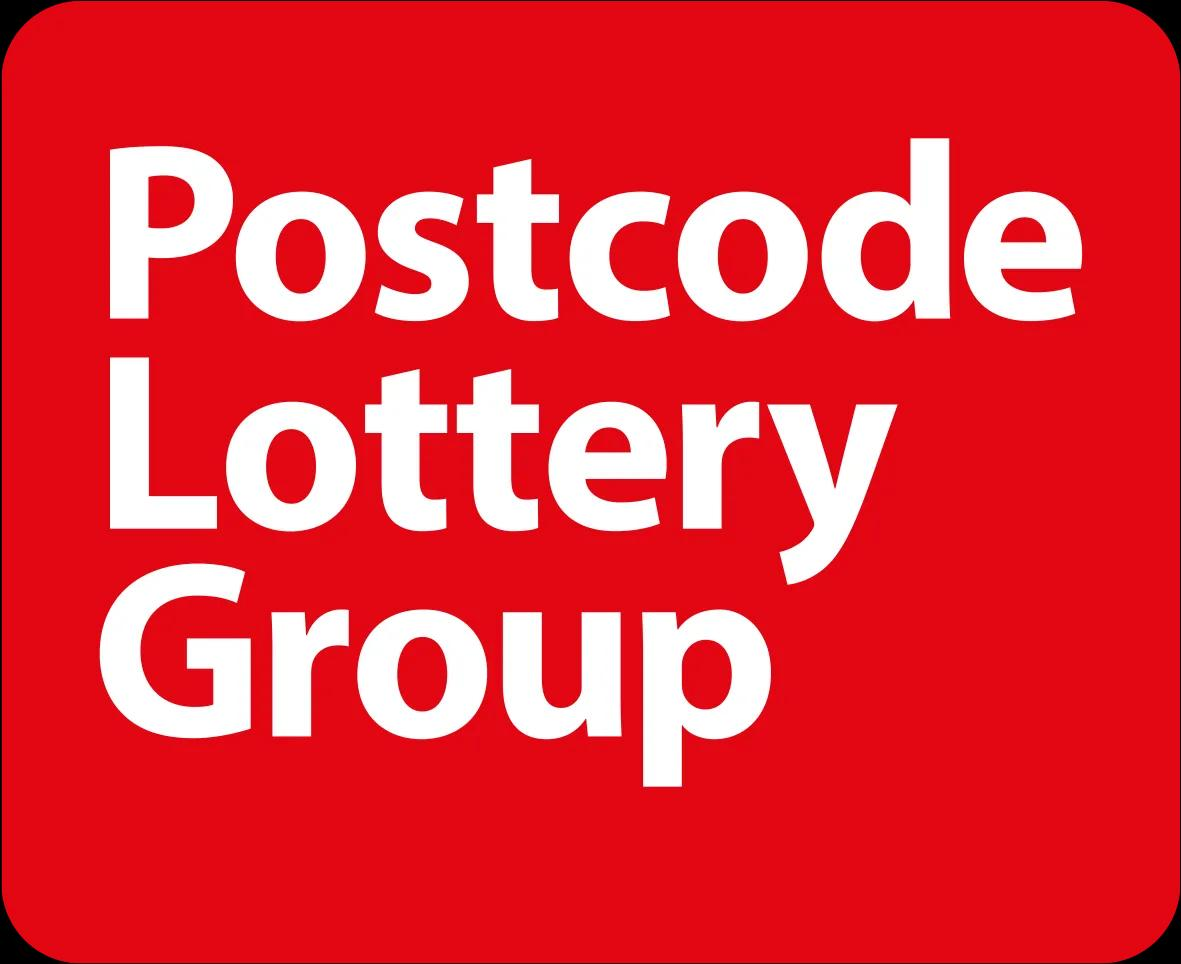
- Formation: 1989; 37 years ago
- Founders: Boudewijn Poelmann, Frank Leeman, Herman de Jong, Simon Jelsma
- Type: Social enterprise
- Purpose: Human rights, nature, biodiversity and environmental protection, development cooperation, equal opportunities, social cohesion, and well-being
- Headquarters: Amsterdam, The Netherlands
- Region served: Worldwide
- Key people: Sigrid van Aken (CEO)
- Website: www.postcodelotterygroup.com
- Formerly called: Novamedia

The Postcode Lottery Group is an international social enterprise, 100% owned by a non-profit foundation. The group establishes and manages charitable lotteries worldwide to raise funds for social organisations working in areas such as culture, nature, environmental and animal protection, health, human rights, and development aid. The Postcode Lottery Group is reported as the world's third-largest private charity donor, after the Bill & Melinda Gates Foundation and the Wellcome Trust.

== History ==
In 1983 Boudewijn Poelmann and his wife Annemiek Hoogenboom founded Novamedia – later known as Postcode Lottery Group – a Dutch marketing and media company established with the mission of supporting social organisations.

In 1989 Boudewijn Poelmann partnered with Frank Leeman, Herman de Jong, and Simon Jelsma to launch the Dutch Postcode Lottery (now Postcode Lottery Netherland) whose mission is to raise funds through the creation and management of lotteries seen as a tool for generating revenue while also engaging the public in charitable giving.

The lottery is based on the concept of using postal codes to determine winning tickets and raise money for charity, through a subscription-based lottery. Since a percentage of the ticket price goes to charities, every player contributes to support social organisations.

The lottery gained popularity in the Netherlands, and Novamedia founded Postcode Lotteries in other European countries, also aimed at raising funds for social organisations. Today, the Postcode Lottery Group operates six lotteries in five countries.

== The postcode lotteries ==
The Postcode Lottery Group launched its first lottery, the Dutch Postcode Lottery (Postcode Lottery Nederland), in 1989. This lottery uses postal codes (zip codes) as ticket numbers and has become one of the largest lotteries in the Netherlands.

For every lottery ticket sold, a part goes to various charitable causes, including environmental conservation, human rights and social welfare; another part goes to the prize pot, a key part of playing a lottery; and the last part goes toward the costs involved in organising the lottery itself.

Following the Dutch subscription-based model, the Postcode Lottery Group set up the People's Postcode Lottery in Great Britain in 2005 (now Postcode Lottery United Kingdom), followed in that same year with by the Swedish Postcode Lottery (Postkodlotteriet Svierge).

In 2016, the Deutsche Postcode Lotterie (now Postcode Lotterie Deutschland) was launched in Germany, to raise funds for German charitable organisations. Two years later, in 2018, the Norwegian Postcode Lottery (Postkodelotteriet Norge) was founded.

These lotteries are collectively known as the Postcode Lottery Group. In 2024, the group announced the establishment of the Canadian Postcode Lottery Foundation in Canada.

The Group also operates the VriendenLoterij (Friends Lottery) in the Netherlands, supporting 60 long-term cultural partners and 3,700 clubs and associations. In 2025, it donated €115 million to cultural organizations, including museums and heritage organisations.

== Operation model ==
The Postcode Lottery Group's operating model is as follows:

1. Use of postcodes: part of what makes the postcode lotteries distinctive is the use of postcodes as ticket numbers to determine winners. This approach relies on publicly available geographic data rather than arbitrary number selection methods.
2. Subscription-based: Postcode lotteries operate on a subscription-based model, where players sign up for ongoing monthly participation rather than purchasing individual tickets for each draw. This structure fosters long-term engagement and provides a stable revenue stream.
3. Regulation and oversight: postcode lotteries are subject to regulatory oversight in the countries where they operate, ensuring compliance with local lottery laws and regulations.
4. Charitable focus: a significant portion of ticket sales revenue is allocated to support a wide range of charitable causes, including social welfare, environmental conservation, healthcare, human rights and education.
5. Impact reporting: Postcode Lottery Group and every postcode lottery provide regular reporting on the impact of its lotteries, detailing the funds raised and the causes supported.
6. Community engagement: Postcode lotteries engage with local communities not only through their support for grassroots organisations and community projects but also by organizing festive manners to hand out prizes to winning communities.
7. Responsible gaming: Postcode Lottery Group upholds standards in its operations to ensure responsible gambling practices according to the principles of fairness, integrity and social responsibility.

== Governance ==
The boards of Postcode Lottery Group are responsible for overseeing the company's strategic direction and financial management. The boards are:

- The executive board that is responsible for the Postcode Lottery Group and its affiliated companies. The members are Sigrid van Aken (CEO), Imme Rog (CMO) and Michiel Verboven (CCO).
- The supervisory board – Novamedia Holding BV – that supervises the policy implemented by the executive board and the general running of Novamedia and its affiliated companies. The board members are G.J.A.M. van der Vossen (chair), C. van der Pol, E.H. Verkoren, and P.A. Zinkweg.
- The Novamedia Foundation that assures the continuity of Novamedia's mission and the social entrepreneurial spirit. The board members are P.L.B.A. van Geel (chair) and G.P. Prein.

== Activities ==
Since its inception, the Postcode Lottery Group has raised more than €15.5 billion in support for thousands of charitable initiatives, locally and internationally.

In 2025, the Group raisedone1 billion euros for charity.

== International supporters ==
In 2001, Nelson Mandela became the first international ambassador of the Postcode Lottery Group. Since then, various personalities around the world have been associated with the group, among whom are:

- Sarah Brown, founder and president of Theirworld
- Bill Clinton, 42nd president of the United States
- George Clooney, actor and human rights activist
- Johan Cruijff, football player and philanthropist
- Roger Federer, tennis player with 20 Grand Slam titles
- Toni Kroos, World Cup Winner, five-time UEFA Champions League Winner
- Nadia Murad, president of Nadia's Initiative for survivors of genocide and sexual violence, Nobel Peace Prize winner 2018
- Rafael Nadal, Spanish tennis player with 22 Grand Slam titles
- Emma Thompson, actor, writer and activist
- Desmond Tutu, archbishop of Cape Town, primate of the Anglican Church of Southern Africa, chairman of the Truth and Reconciliation Commission
- Katarina Witt, former figure skating star and Olympic gold medalist

== Awards ==
In 2022 the postcode lottery was recognised as the "Top Global Funder You (Probably) Haven't Heard Of" by Inside Philanthropy's Philanthropy Awards (IPPAs).

In 2025, its CEO Sigrid van Aken was admitted into the Order of the Légion d'Honneur by the French Government during the Paris Peace Forum.
