= Ravish Kumar =

Indian journalist and writer (born 1974)

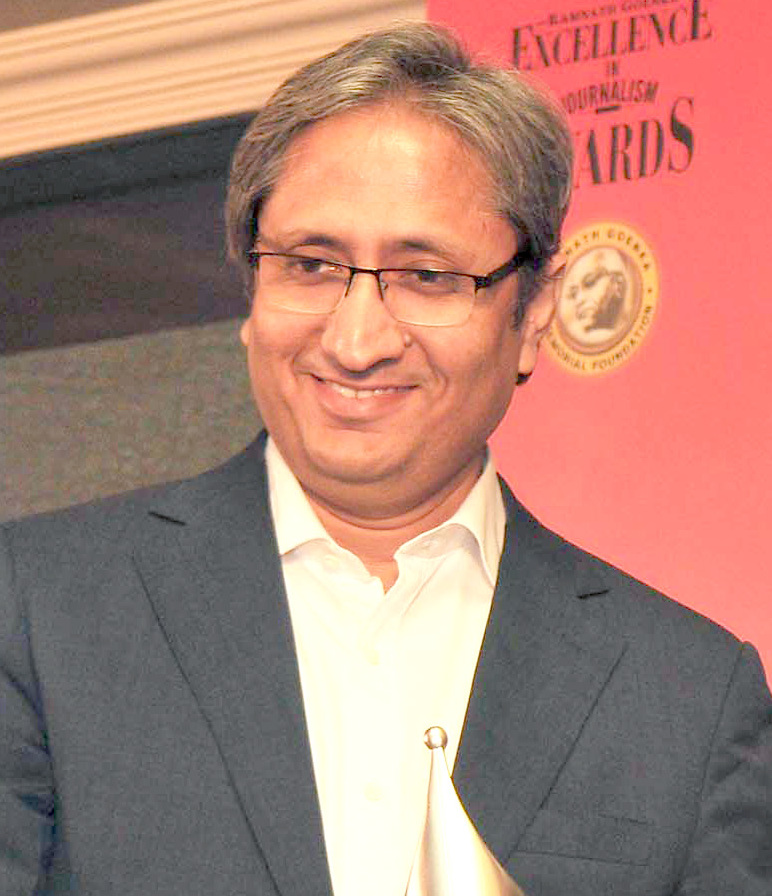
- Kumar receiving 12th Ramnath Goenka Excellence in Journalism Award in New Delhi, 2017.
- Born: 5 December 1974 (age 51); Jitwarpur, Bihar, India
- Education: University of Delhi; Indian Institute of Mass Communication
- Occupation: Journalist
- Employer: NDTV (1994–2022)
- Spouse: Nayana Dasgupta
- Children: 2
- Awards: Ramon Magsaysay Award (2019); Ramnath Goenka Excellence in Journalism Awards (2013, 2017); Red Ink Award (2016)

YouTube information
- Channel: Ravish Kumar Official
- Subscribers: 14.6 million
- Views: 2.95 billion
- Last updated: 6 June 2026

Ravish Kumar (born Ravish Kumar Pandey; 5 December 1974) is an Indian journalist and author. He worked for the Hindi-language television news channel NDTV India from 1994 to 2022, eventually becoming its Senior Executive Editor. He hosted a number of the channel's programmes including its flagship weekday show Prime Time as well as Hum Log, Ravish Ki Report, and Des Ki Baat. In 2022, Kumar resigned from NDTV, following its acquisition by the Adani Group, and started a YouTube channel. Kumar has twice been conferred with Ramnath Goenka Excellence in Journalism Award (in 2013 and 2017) and became the fifth Indian journalist to receive the Ramon Magsaysay Award in 2019.

== Early life and education ==
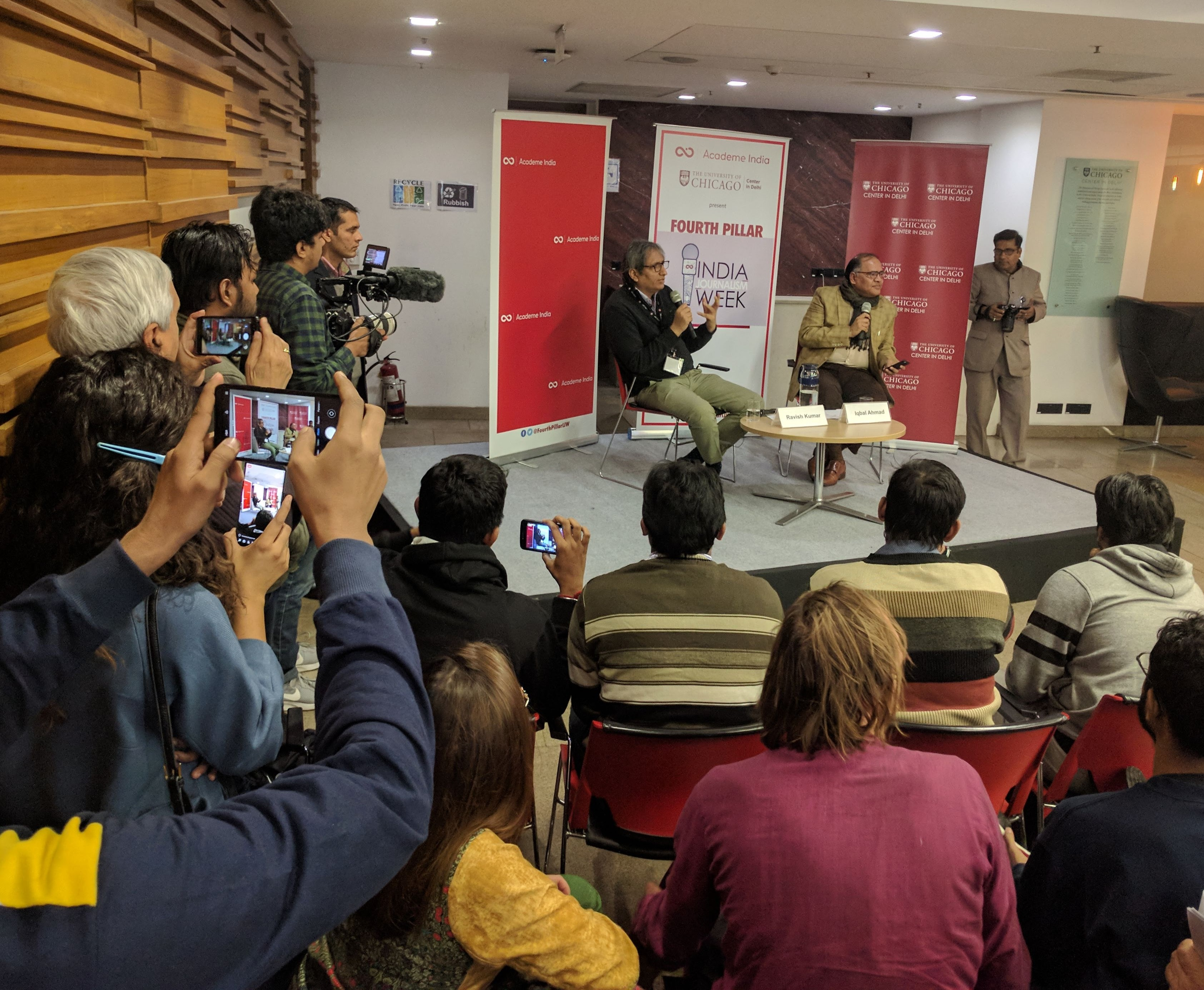
Ravish Kumar (visible on stage on the left) speaking during a lecture at University of Chicago Center's Journalism week in New Delhi in 2018.

Kumar was born on 5 December 1974 in Jitwarpur village in East Champaran district of Bihar, to Baliram Pandey and Yashoda Pandey. He obtained his high school education from Loyola High School, Patna. Later he moved to Delhi for higher studies. He graduated from Deshbandhu College, affiliated with the University of Delhi. Eventually he enrolled in post-graduate diploma in Hindi Journalism from the Indian Institute of Mass Communication.

Kumar has a brother named Brajesh Kumar, who is an Indian National Congress leader from Bihar.

== Career ==
From 1994 to 2022, he was employed by NDTV India (New Delhi Television), eventually as the Senior Executive Editor. He hosted several programmes, including the channel's flagship weekday show Prime Time as well as Hum Log, Ravish Ki Report, and Des Ki Baat.

During the 2014 Indian general election, he did extensive field interviews in several North Indian states about the opinions and needs of the people on the ground highlighting aspects of rural and suburban life which do not receive much attention in television news. He is noted for his offbeat reporting in explaining the contemporary plight of Indian society. Kumar is also known for writing romantic micro fiction stories for which he coined the term "laprek" (short for "laghu prem katha" lit. 'short love story').

Kumar is known for coining the term "Godi media" (lit. 'lap dog media') for mainstream Indian media outlets that critics regard as uncritically supportive of prime minister Narendra Modi and the Bharatiya Janata Party (BJP). He also coined the term "WhatsApp University" to refer to the fake news and misinformation spread in India through WhatsApp forwards particularly those by the BJP IT Cell.

He has received death threats in the past for his journalism. On 30 November 2022, he resigned from NDTV, following the television network's acquisition of NDTV by the Adani Group. The Adani Group is owned by billionaire Gautam Adani who is seen as close to prime minister Modi.

Kumar started a YouTube channel after resigning from his job. On 5 May 2024, his channel reached the milestone of 10 million subscribers.

== Personal life ==
Kumar is married to Nayana Dasgupta who teaches history at the Lady Shri Ram College, University of Delhi. He has two daughters, Tanima and Tanisha.

== Works ==
=== Books ===
==== Non-fiction ====
- Ravishpanti (2014, Hindi)
- Bolna Hi Hai: Loktantra, Sanskriti Aur Rashtra Ke Bare Mein (Hindi)
  - The Free Voice: On Democracy, Culture and the Nation, (2018, English translation)
- Dekhate Rahiye (Hindi)

==== Fiction ====
- Ishq Mein Shahar Hona (2015, Hindi)
  - A City Happens In Love (2018, English translation by Akhil Katyal)

=== Films ===
Kumar was the subject of the 2023 documentary While We Watched directed by Vinay Shukla.

=== Television ===
As host on NDTV India:

- Prime Time
- Hum Log
- Ravish Ki Report
- Des Ki Baat

== Awards and accolades ==
Kumar has been conferred with various awards for his work in journalism including the Ramon Magsaysay Award (2019). He has twice been the recipient of the Ramnath Goenka Excellence in Journalism Award (2013, 2017) for the broadcast category in the Hindi language. The list of honours continues with the first Gauri Lankesh Award for Journalism, the first Kuldip Nayar Journalism Award (2017), Ganesh Shankar Vidyarthi Award for Hindi Journalism and Creative Literature (for 2010, awarded in 2014). He was included in the list of 100 most influential Indians (2016) by The Indian Express and also named "Journalist of the Year" by the Mumbai Press Club.

Kumar was awarded the "Honorary Title for Freedom of Expression" for his critical and independent journalism in India by the Vrije Universiteit Brussel (VUB) and the Université libre de Bruxelles (ULB) in Brussels, Belgium on the occasion of World Press Freedom Day, 2023.

=== List of awards and nominations ===
Year	Award	Notes	Ref.
2013	Ramnath Goenka Excellence in Journalism Award	"Journalist of the Year Award". Broadcast category in the Hindi language.	
2014	Ganesh Shankar Vidyarthi Award	For Hindi Journalism and Creative Literature (for 2010).	
2016	Red Ink Award	"Journalist of the Year Award" for his consistent and down to earth reporting on politics and issues that concern the common man.	
2016	100 Most Influential Indians	By the Indian Express.	
2017	Ramnath Goenka Excellence in Journalism Award	"Journalist of the Year Award". Broadcast category in the Hindi language.	
2017	Kuldip Nayar Journalism Award	The first recipient of the award.	
2019	Ramon Magsaysay Award	For his unfaltering commitment to a professional, ethical journalism of the highest standards; his moral courage in standing up for truth, integrity, and independence; and his principled belief that it is in giving full and respectful voice to the voiceless, in speaking truth bravely yet soberly to power, that journalism fulfills its noblest aims to advance democracy.	
2019	Gauri Lankesh Memorial Award	He was chosen for the award for sharp news analysis and uncompromising secular stance by the Gauri Lankesh Memorial Trust, founded in memory of the journalist. The first recipient of the award.	
2023	Honorary Title for Freedom of Expression	For his critical and independent journalism in India by the Vrije Universiteit Brussel (VUB) and the Université libre de Bruxelles (ULB) in Brussels, Belgium on the occasion of World Press Freedom Day, 2023.	
2024	Peabody Award		
	Journalist of the Year	By the Mumbai Press Club.	

== See also ==
- List of Indian journalists
- Online journalism in India
- Censorship in India
- Television censorship#India
- The dictionary definition of Godi media at Wiktionary
- The dictionary definition of WhatsApp University at Wiktionary
