= Nationale Postcode Loterij =

Lottery in the Netherlands

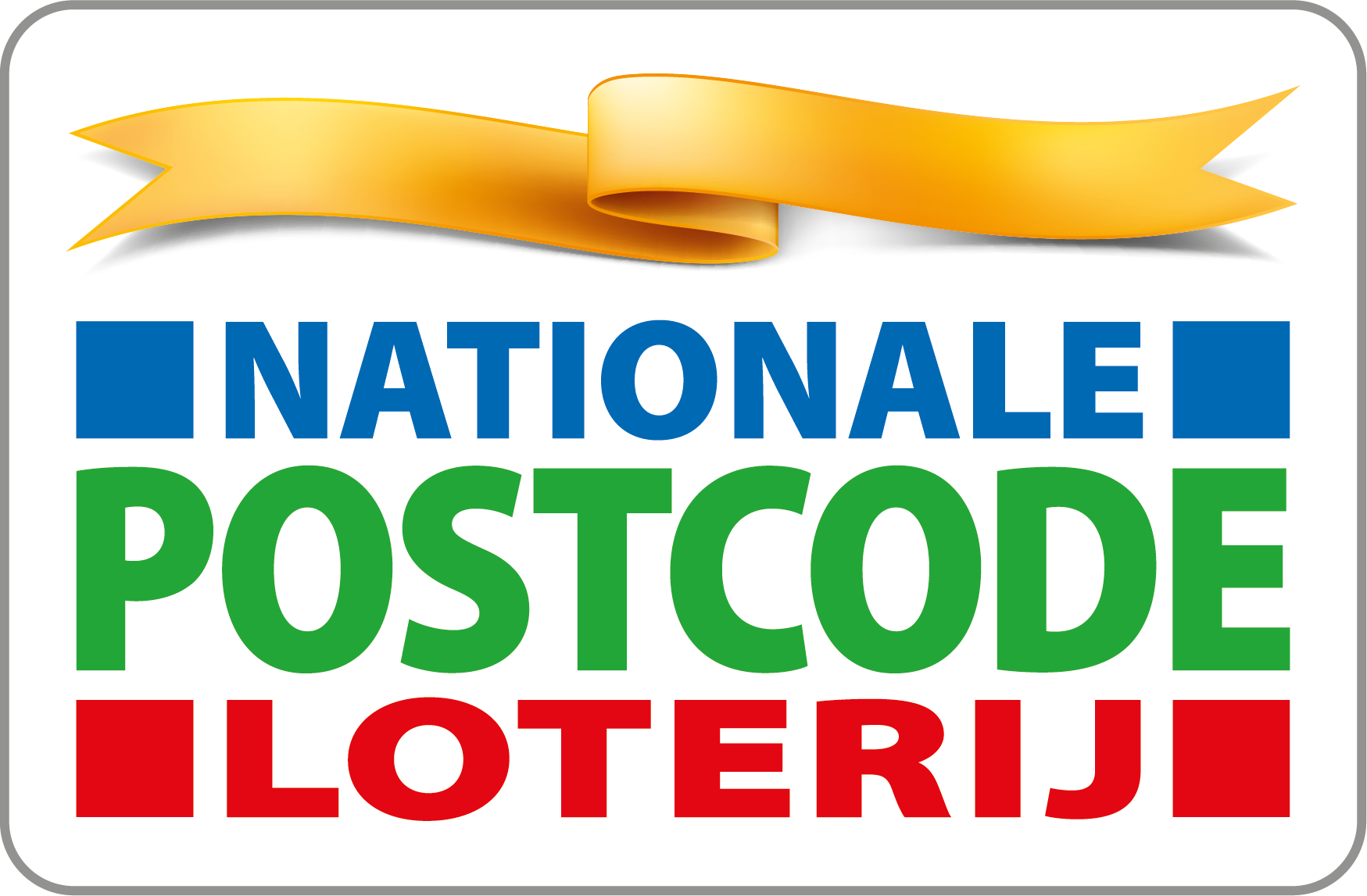

Agency overview
- Headquarters: Amsterdam, Netherlands
- Website: https://www.postcodeloterij.nl

The Nationale Postcode Loterij (National Postcode Lottery) is the biggest charity lottery in the Netherlands. It was founded in 1989 by Novamedia, a marketing agency that sets up and runs charity lotteries. As required by the Dutch government, forty percent of the proceeds of this lottery are donated amongst 81 charities, which, in 2010 amounted to over 270 million euros.

Prize winners are the lot owners whose postal code, a code that forms part of the winners' residential address, has been drawn. Hence even if not participating one may still find out that one would have won had one played. Anticipations of post-decisional regret influence decisions to play the Postcode lottery. Until 2012 it was prohibited to use the postal code for commercial purposes, and in that year, the government allowed the postal code to be used commercially.

Novamedia has expanded the Postcode Lottery format in several European countries:

- 2015: Svenska Postkodlotteriet in Sweden, People’s Postcode Lottery in Great Britain.
- 2016: Deutsche Postcode Lotterie in Germany.
- 2018: Norsk Postkodelotteri in Norway.

== Ambassadors ==
Several notable individuals endorse the lottery, and have been appointed ambassadors, including:

Ambassadors

- Gaston Starreveld
- Humberto Tan
- Winston Gerschtanowitz
- Caroline Tensen
- Quinty Trustfull
- Nicolette van Dam
- Martijn Krabbé
- Esther Vergeer
- Richard Krajicek

International ambassadors

- Rafael Nadal, tennis player
- Bill Clinton, whose Clinton Foundation is a recipient of proceeds from Nationale Postcode Loterij
- George Clooney
- Nadia Murad
- Roger Federer
- Katarina Witt
- Muhammad Yunus
- Emma Thompson
- Sarah Brown
- Nice Nailantei Leng'ete
- Denis Mukwege

Deceased ambassadors

- Nelson Mandela (the first international ambassador of Nationale Postcode Loterij)
- Johan Cruyff
- Desmond Tutu

== Proceeds donated to charities ==
Figures are in millions of euros:

- 2000 - 159.0
- 2001 - 177.1
- 2002 - 203.3
- 2003 - 217.4
- 2004 - 225.2
- 2005 - 212.5
- 2006 - 216.7
- 2007 - 226.0
- 2008 - 244.4
- 2009 - 256.5
- 2011 - 270.5

== Charities ==
Charities receiving proceeds include:

- Amnesty International
- AMREF Flying Doctors
- ARK
- Artsen Zonder Grenzen
- Bellingcat
- BiD Network
- BRAC
- Carbon War Room
- Clinton Foundation
- Cordaid Memisa
- Cordaid Mensen in Nood
- Dance4Life
- DARA (international organization)
- De12Landschappen
- Defence for Children-ECPAT
- De Provinciale Milieufederaties
- De Vrolijkheid
- Dierenbescherming
- Dokters van de Wereld
- Dutch Caribbean Nature Alliance
- European Partnership for Democracy
- Fairfood International
- Fair Trade Original
- Free Voice
- Fundación Rafa Nadal
- The Global Fund
- Goois Natuurreservaat
- Greenpeace
- Hivos
- Humanitas
- Human Rights Watch
- ICCO
- IMC Weekendschool
- IUCN Nederlands Comité
- IVN natuur- en milieueducatie
- Landelijke Vereniging van Wereldwinkels
- Landschapsbeheer Nederland
- Leprastichting
- Liliane Fonds
- Mama Cash
- Milieudefensie
- MYBODY
- Natuurmonumenten
- Nederlandse Rode Kruis
- Nelson Mandela Kinderfonds
- Oranje Fonds
- Oxfam Novib
- www.brac.net
- Peace Parks Foundation
- Plan Nederland
- Postcode Lottery Green Challenge
- Prins Claus Fonds
- Resto VanHarte
- Rocky Mountain Institute
- Save the Children Nederland
- Sea Shepherd Conservation Society
- Simavi
- Skanfonds
- Solidaridad
- SOS Kinder-dorpen
- Stichting AAP
- Stichting Buurtlink
- Stichting DOEN
- Stichting Max Havelaar
- Stichting Natuur en Milieu
- Stichting Vluchteling
- Stichting voor Vluchteling-Studenten UAF
- STOP AIDS NOW!
- Terre des hommes
- The Climate Group
- UNHCR
- UNICEF
- University for Peace
- Vereniging Nederlands Cultuurlandschap
- VluchtelingenWerk Nederland
- Vogelbescherming Nederland
- Waddenvereniging
- War Child
- Wereld Natuur Fonds
- World Food Programme

== See also ==
- Miljoenenjacht - Game show from the Nationale Postcode Loterij that eventually was spun off into the global Deal or No Deal television franchise
- Eén tegen 100 - Game show from the Nationale Postcode Loterij that eventually was the original version of the global 1 vs. 100 television franchise
- Postkodmiljonären - Game show from the Svenska Postkodlotteriet that was the Swedish version of the global Who Wants to Be a Millionaire? television franchise
