= Maya (narrative universe) =

- Created by: Anand Gandhi; Zain Memon
- Original work: Maya: Seed Takes Root (2026)
- Owner: Department of Lore
- Years: 2025–present

Print publications
- Novel(s): Maya: Seed Takes Root (2026)

Games
- Traditional: Trials of MAYA (2026)

Official website
- www.entermaya.com

Maya Narrative Universe is a science fantasy universe created by filmmaker Anand Gandhi and game designer Zain Memon. Set on the fictional planet of Neh, the project includes novels, graphic novels, tabletop and digital games, films, and immersive experiences produced by Department of Lore, a studio founded by Gandhi and Memon. The first work from the series, Maya: Seed Takes Root, was launched via a Kickstarter crowdfunding campaign in August 2025. The audiobook edition is narrated by actor Hugo Weaving. The retail edition was co-published by Authors Equity and distributed globally by Simon & Schuster.

== Setting ==
The narrative is set on the fictional planet Neh, which is inhabited by several sapient species. A network of Maya trees functions as a communication system through which inhabitants enter shared dreamscapes for activities such as communication, learning, work, and recreation. According to the narrative, a group of amortal beings known as the Divyas use all the information gathered through the network to predict possible futures and subtly influence the behaviour of the population. Published works identify several species inhabiting Neh, including the manushyas (human-like beings), naags (serpent-like beings), garudas (avian beings), vaanars (primate-like beings), and rakshasis. The narrative explores themes including surveillance, predictive technologies, free will, social inequality, and the relationship between data and individual freedom.

== Development ==
Anand Gandhi and Zain Memon began developing MAYA in 2021 following their collaboration on the game SHASN and other media projects under Memesys Culture Lab. Produced through Department of Lore by Shreya Dudheria, the project took roughly five years to create and involved a multidisciplinary team of writers, designers, and consultants. Architect and educator Shikha Parmar and her students at CEPT University worked on the speculative architecture of the fictional world. Actress Kani Kusruti also contributed to the project's scene design.

In interviews, Gandhi and Memon described MAYA as a long-term transmedia project exploring themes such as surveillance, artificial intelligence, and social systems. Gandhi referred to the project as "civilizational storytelling", while Memon said that its fictional world was designed from "first principles". Developed over four years, the project was conceived as a transmedia work spanning films, games, novels, graphic novels and immersive experiences. In August 2025, Gandhi presented MAYA at Worldcon in Seattle, while Gandhi and Memon presented the project at The Independence Project exhibition in Mumbai. In October 2025, Gandhi and Memon presented MAYA at New York Comic Con where Gandhi participated in a panel moderated by CNN journalist Omar Jimenez. MAYA was also showcased at LA Comic Con.

== Published works ==
=== Maya: Seed Takes Root ===
==== Synopsis ====
Maya: Seed Takes Root is a science fantasy novel co-authored by Anand Gandhi and Zain Memon. The narrative begins when the Divyas announce the "Divya Trials," a planet-wide tournament in which billions compete for immortality and near-omnipotence. The Maya network predicts the tournament will be won by Tarkash, a garuda scion of a Divya. A covert naag operative named Kshar is trained by a manushya, Adharvan, to simulate and carry out an assassination attempt against Tarkash within the network. The primary protagonist, Yachay, a nineteen-year-old manushya raised in isolation by his grandfather Daddu, has never connected to Maya and is invisible to the Divyas' predictive systems as a result. The novel follows how these three paths converge.

==== Publication and reception ====
The novel was edited by Shreya Dudheria, Aayush Asthana, and Liz Gorinsky. It was initially funded through a Kickstarter campaign launched on 9 September 2025, raising US$426,356 from 4,185 backers against an initial target of $10,000. Including post-campaign pledges, the project gathered over $547,000 from 5,378 backers; making it the highest-funded debut novel campaign in the crowdfunding history.

The trade edition was acquired by Authors Equity for worldwide release, with distribution handled by Simon & Schuster, and was released on 25 August 2026.

The audiobook edition is narrated by Hugo Weaving, who previously presented Gandhi's 2013 debut feature film Ship of Theseus in Australia. The print edition includes a foreword by neuroscientist Anil Seth, author of Being You: A New Science of Consciousness (2021). In his foreword, Anil Seth described it as “a book of extraordinary riches” containing “provocative philosophical nuggets” within a narrative that is “sweeping and immersive”.

== Reception ==
Variety described the universe as “uncomfortably close to our current relationship with technology and social media algorithms”, and as a deliberate attempt to prompt audiences to examine the systems shaping their consumption. Esquire called the project "a narrative superstructure" and "a story that rewires the way we tell stories in the first place." The Hollywood Reporter described it as "an allegory of our hyperconnected world." Screen Rant characterised the novel as "a sweeping story of chaos and control, the powerful and the expendable.
