= Critchlow =

Critchlow is a surname. Notable people with the surname include:

- Anthony Critchlow of Living in a Box, British band founded in 1985
- Carl Critchlow, British fantasy and science fiction comic illustrator
- Donald T. Critchlow (born 1948), historian, professor of American political history at Arizona State University
- Frank Critchlow (1932–2010), British community activist and civil rights campaigner
- Hannah Critchlow (born 1980), British scientist, writer and broadcaster
- Hubert Nathaniel Critchlow (1884–1958), founder of the modern trade union movement in Guyana
- Jerry Critchlow (1904–1972), British painter
- Joe Critchlow (born 1944), former Canadian football player
- Keith Critchlow (1933–2020), artist, lecturer, author, Sacred Geometer and professor of architecture
- Mik Critchlow (1955–2023), British social documentary and portrait photographer
- Rex Critchlow (1936–2010), architect and industrial designer
- Roark Critchlow (born 1963), Canadian actor, best known for appearing on the US soap opera Days of Our Lives
- Stephen Critchlow (1966–2021), British actor, known for his work in the theatre and appearances on radio series
- Tess Critchlow (born 1995), Canadian snowboarder, competing in the discipline of snowboard cross
- Wendy Critchlow, American politician
- William Critchlow Harris (1854–1913), English-born Canadian architect noted for ecclesiastical and domestic projects in Maritime Canada
- William J. Critchlow Jr. (1892–1968), general authority of The Church of Jesus Christ of Latter-day Saints 1958–1968

== See also ==
- Kathy Critchlow-Smith, British Paralympic archer who has competed at five Paralympics
- Crichlow
- Critchley
- Kerriochloa
