= Critchley =

Critchley (also spelled Chritchley) is an Anglo-Saxon surname. Notable people with the surname include:

- Alexander Critchley (1893–1974), English politician and Conservative MP for Liverpool Edge Hill
- Alfred Critchley (1890–1963), Canadian-English entrepreneur and national politician
- Bruce Critchley (born 1942), British sports commentator
- David Critchley, English football manager
- Emily Critchley (born 1980), English poet and writer
- Gary Critchley (born 1962), British convicted murderer, ultimately released
- Hilary Critchley (born before 1978), British academic in the field of reproductive medicine
- Hugo Critchley, British psychiatrist
- Humphrey Critchley-Salmonson (1894–1956), English cricketer
- Jack Critchley (1892–1964), Australian politician
- James S. Critchley (1865–1944), English mechanical engineer, director of Daimler Motor Company
- Jason Critchley (born 1970), Welsh rugby union and rugby league footballer
- John Critchley (born 1964), Canadian record producer and musician
- Julian Critchley (1930–2000), English national politician, journalist and writer
- Laura Critchley (born 1984), English singer-songwriter
- MacDonald Critchley (1900–1997), English neurologist
- Margaret Critchley (born 1949), British sprinter
- Matt Critchley (born 1996), English cricketer
- Morrie Critchley (1850–1910), American baseball pitcher
- Neil Critchley (born 1978), English footballer
- Oswald Critchley (1864–1935), English-Canadian provincial politician, pioneer and rancher
- Pat Critchley, Irish athlete
- Ron Critchley, (1940–2025), Australian rules footballer
- Simon Critchley (born 1960), English philosopher and academic
- Ted Critchley (1903–1996), English footballer
- Tom Critchley (1916–2009), Australian diplomat
