= Anand Gandhi =

Indian film director

- Anand Gandhi in 2011
- Born: 26 September 1980 (age 46); Mumbai, India
- Occupations: Filmmaker, Entrepreneur, Writer, Director, Producer, Systems Researcher
- Years active: 2000–present

Anand Gandhi (born Anand Modi, 26 September 1980) is an Indian filmmaker, entrepreneur, media producer, innovator and systems researcher. His debut feature film, Ship of Theseus (2013), premiered at the Toronto International Film Festival, won the National Film Award for Best Picture. His second film, Tumbbad (2018), for which he served as director, creative director, executive producer, and screenwriter, opened the Critics' Week at the 75th Venice International Film Festival. Gandhi is also the founder of Memesys Culture Lab, a new media studio and systems think tank.

In 2017, Gandhi produced An Insignificant Man, a documentary film directed by Khushboo Ranka and Vinay Shukla about the rise of the Aam Aadmi Party in India. The film was acquired by Vice for international distribution. He also produced the documentary film While We Watched.

Actor and producer Ajay Devgn bought rights to Gandhi's play Beta Kaagdo. It has been made into the feature film Helicopter Eela, starring Bollywood actress Kajol. Gandhi is also the co-creator of ElseVR, a virtual reality (VR) platform that produces and distributes immersive storytelling experiences. He has produced the board games SHASN and SHASN: Azadi created by Zain Memon.

While on the steering committee of the 48th International Film Festival of India (IFFI), Gandhi served as the creative director of the new VR chapter of the festival.

Gandhi has also co-created the MAYA Narrative Universe with game designer Zain Memon.

== Early life ==
Gandhi’s last name was Modi until his mother remarried when he was 15. His last name was updated to Gandhi after he was adopted by his stepfather. He spoke Gujarati for the first ten years of his life, and continues to "fascinated by the language" citing a persisting interest in the poetry of Ramesh Parekh, Mareez, and Shekhadam Abuwala.

During his childhood, Gandhi developed an interest in neuroscience, evolutionary biology, and philosophy. He has cited Richard Dawkins and Douglas Adams as early influences.

Gandhi dropped out of college at 18.

== Career ==
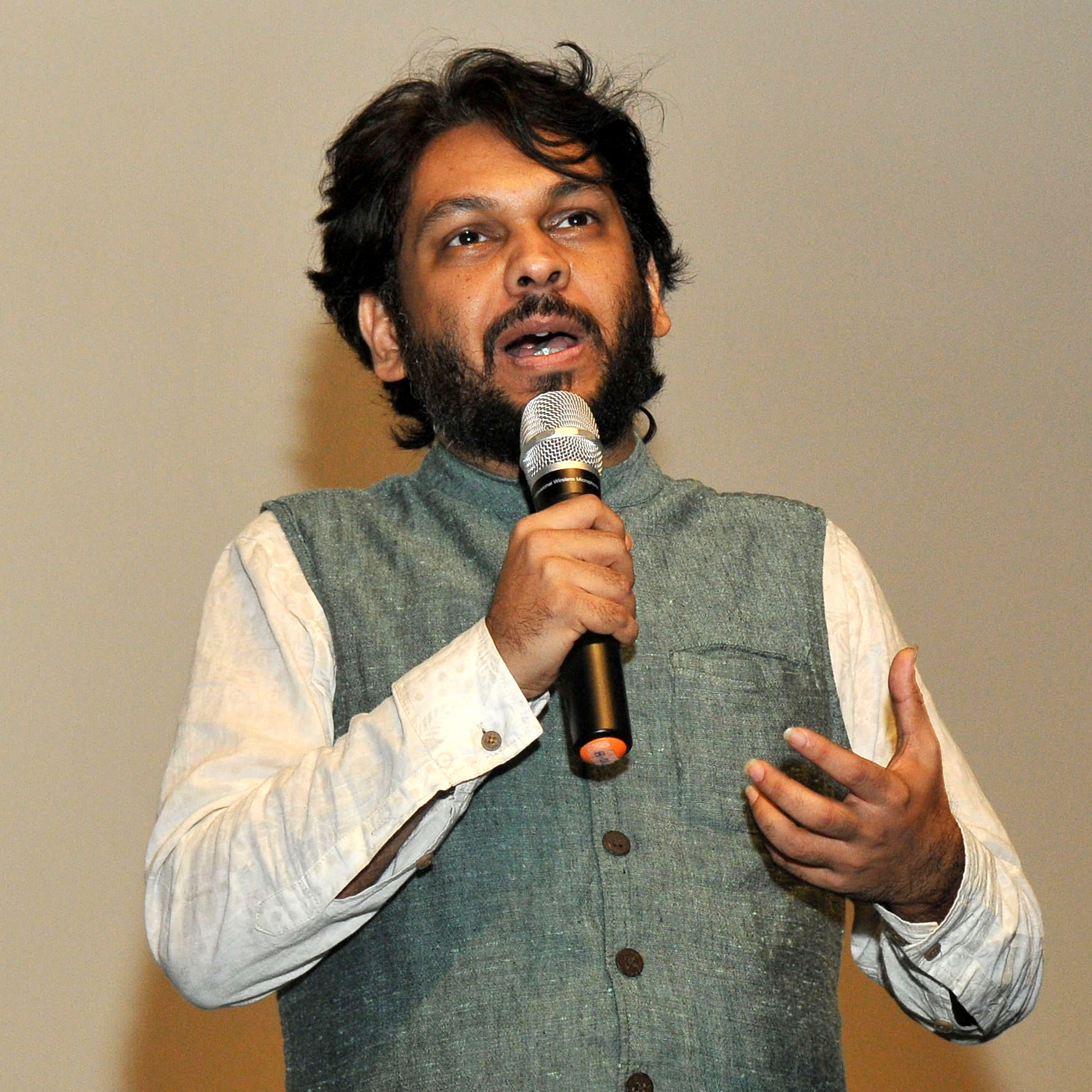
Anand Gandhi at the Master Class on ′Virtual Reality: The emerging grammar of a new language′, IFFI (2017)

=== Television, theatre and short films ===
Gandhi's writing career began in 2000 when he wrote dialogue for the first eighty-two episodes of popular daily soap opera Kyunki Saas Bhi Kabhi Bahu Thi and screenplay for Kahaani Ghar Ghar Kii, both of which became the longest running shows on Indian Television. During the same period, Gandhi wrote several one-act plays for alternative theatre, including Pratyancha, Kshanotsav, Na, Janashtaru and Sugandhi. He also wrote the Gujarati play Chal Reverse Ma Jaiye and produced Grey Elephants in Denmark (2009), a Hindi-English play written and directed by Chaitanya Tamhane. In 2001, Gandhi wrote and directed the Gujarati play Beta Kaagdo. The rights to the play were later acquired by Ajay Devgn, and it was adapted into the 2018 Hindi film Helicopter Eela, directed by Pradeep Sarkar.

He made his film directorial debut with Right Here, Right Now (2003), a critically acclaimed 30-minute short film that dealt with the idea of cyclic causality and was shot in two continuous takes. The film premiered in competition at the Tribeca Film Festival. His second film Continuum (2006), which he co-wrote and co-directed with Khushboo Ranka, was a montage of simple stories from everyday life, popular culture and folklore that explore "the continuum of life and death, of love and paranoia, of trade and value, of need and invention, of hunger and enlightenment".

Gandhi has also directed numerous brand films. His film, based on the work of Dr Dnyaneshwar Bhosale, 'Vicks: Care Lives On #TouchOfCare' won 4 awards at Spikes Asia Award 2022 - a Silver in Direction and a Bronze in Casting, Script and Cinematography - most by an Indian film in the Film Craft category. His previous film for Vicks, titled 'One In a Million', won 4 Cannes Lions in 2019, including a Silver Lion and 3 Bronze Lions for Creative Strategy, Film Craft, and Film Healthcare. The film also won three Silvers at Spikes Asia for Direction, Script, and Casting in the Filmcraft category. Gandhi’s Lifebuoy ‘Help a child reach 5’ campaign won a Bronze Cannes Lion in 2017 for Creative Effectiveness, along with the “Grand Prix” in PR, and “Silver” in Healthcare at Spikes Asia 2016. His film for Gillette "Soldiers can cry" won a shortlist at Cannes 2020. Gandhi was on the jury of the One Show 2022.

=== Ship of Theseus ===
Gandhi’s first feature-length film Ship of Theseus premiered at the 2012 Toronto International Film Festival, where it was discovered as the "hidden gem" of the festival's selection of films that year. It won the Best Film Award at the Transylvania International Film Festival, Best Cinematography Award at the Tokyo International Film Festival, the Jury Prize for Technical Excellence at the Mumbai Film Festival, and Best Actress Award at the Dubai International Film Festival. The title of the film alludes to Theseus' paradox, most notably recorded in Life of Theseus, wherein the Greek historian and philosopher Plutarch inquires whether a ship that has been restored by replacing all its parts remains the same ship.

The film was released in India on 19 July 2013. It was reported to be the highest grossing international arthouse film at the Indian box office at the time of its release. In 2014, it won the National Film Award for Best Feature Film at the 61st National Film Awards.

The film's sound design was completed in collaboration with Hungarian sound designer Gábor Erdélyi. It was released theatrically in Australia in November 2013 and was presented by actor Hugo Weaving.

Following the release of Ship of Theseus, Gandhi distributed Nishtha Jain's documentary film Gulabi Gang through Recyclewala Films. It was among the first documentary films to receive a theatrical distribution in India. The film won the National Film Award for Best Film on Social Issues and the National Film Award for Best Editing (Non-Feature Film) at the 61st National Film Awards. In 2013, British film critic Derek Malcolm selected Gandhi's Ship of Theseus for "The Film That Changed My Life", a screening series organized to mark the centenary of The Critics' Circle.

On the seventh anniversary of the release of Ship of Theseus, Gandhi released the poster for his film project Emergence, which is set in a post-pandemic world.

=== An Insignificant Man ===
On 11 September 2016, Anand's documentary production An Insignificant Man had its world premiere at the Toronto International Film Festival. The film was also screened at the BFI London Film Festival and the Busan International Film Festival.

Directed by Khushboo Ranka and Vinay Shukla, An Insignificant Man was released in theatres in India on 17 November 2017. The film was released in more than 33 screens across India and continued to perform well into its third and fourth weeks. The box office net of 12 million INR makes it the most successful documentary feature out of India. The film, which chronicles the rise of anti-corruption protests in India and the formation and rise to power of the Aam Aadmi Party, received standing ovations in theatres and was picked up by VICE Media.

=== Tumbbad ===
Gandhi directed Tumbbad (2018) alongside Rahi Anil Barve, and was also credited as co-writer, creative director, and executive producer. The film was shot between November 2014 and May 2015 after an earlier 2012 production was restarted.

== Memesys Culture Lab ==
Towards the end of 2015, Anand founded Memesys Culture Lab with Zain Memon, Khushboo Ranka, Vinay Shukla, Neil Pagedar and Pooja Shetty. The lab launched six VR documentaries on ElseVR, a VR journalism platform. Gandhi and team commissioned documentary filmmakers to capture "extraordinary and urgent stories" in VR, accompanied by a piece of long-form journalism. Author Shubhangi Swarup served as executive editor.

The VR documentaries available on the ElseVR platform are:

- When Borders Move by Shubhangi Swarup
- Yeh Ballet by Sooni Taraporevala
- Submerged by Nishtha Jain
- Caste is not a Rumour by Naomi Shah and Pourush Turel
- The Cost of Coal by Faiza Ahmad Khan and Aruna Chandrashekhar
- Right to Pray by Khushboo Ranka

The ElseVR team also created two behind-the-scenes documentaries, Dhaakad and Inside Dangal, on the making of Aamir Khan's Dangal. For ElseVR, Memesys partnered with Amnesty International India, Oxfam India and United Nations Virtual Reality (UNVR) and BBC.

Through Memesys Culture Lab, Gandhi served as executive producer of Shasn, a political strategy board game designed by Zain Memon and released in 2019. Developed from research undertaken during the production of An Insignificant Man, the game received the Social Impact Award at IndieCade Europe in 2021. Its sequel, Shasn: Azadi, later became the first tabletop game to be recognized by Games for Change.

=== Ok Computer (2021) ===
In 2021, Gandhi co-wrote and produced the science fiction comedy series OK Computer through Memesys Culture Lab. Created by Pooja Shetty and Neil Pagedar, it premiered on Disney+ Hotstar and was screened at the International Film Festival Rotterdam and the New Zealand International Film Festival.

Gandhi has also completed development on two projects New Aesop's Fables and Some of All Pasts.

=== MAYA (2021–present) ===
In 2021, Gandhi and game designer Zain Memon began developing Maya as a transmedia project involving novels, films, games, graphic novels and immersive experiences. The project is produced through Department of Lore, a studio co-founded by Gandhi and Memon, and involved a multidisciplinary team of writers, designers and consultants.

The first novel, MAYA: Seed Takes Root, co-authored by Gandhi and Memon, was launched through Kickstarter in September 2025. The campaign raised more than US$540,000 from over 5,300 backers. The trade edition of MAYA: Seed Takes Root was published by Authors Equity on 25 August 2026, with worldwide distribution handled by Simon & Schuster. The audiobook is narrated by Hugo Weaving, with a foreword by neuroscientist Anil Seth.

== Talks and engagements ==
Gandhi was selected for the INK Fellowship which comprised "around 25 young change-makers from across disciplines like art, science, social concerns, sport and technology, who they believe will be game-changers in their respective fields".

Anand was a speaker at the Singularity University (SingularityU) Forum in India, where he shared his ideas on using insights from cognitive science in narrative structures. The summit also featured talks by Peter Diamandis, Rob Nail, Neil Jacobstein, and Stefan Sagmeister, among others.

Gandhi is also the recipient of the Rajeev Circle Fellowship, designed to "identify and empower young entrepreneurs".

Gandhi moderated a masterclass at the Global Entrepreneurship Summit 2017 on the future of Virtual Reality (VR) and Augmented Reality (AR).

Gandhi was invited by the I&B Ministry to lead the VR chapter of the 48th International Film Festival of India (IFFI), 2017 held in Goa. He delivered a masterclass on VR as the new medium to "preserve records and memories for posterity".

== Filmography ==
=== Short films ===
Year	Title	Director	Writer	Producer	Notes
2003	Right Here, Right Now	Yes	Yes	Yes	Syracuse International Film Festival – Best Film (International Short); Shnit International Short-Film Festival – Best Film (Audience Choice Award); Mocha Film Club – Best Film
2006	Continuum	Yes	Yes	Executive	Hanover Up and Coming Film Festival – Film Comet
2014	Newborns			Yes	Documentary
2016	When All Land Is Lost, Do We Eat Coal?			Executive	Documentary
2016	Right to Pray			Executive	Documentary
2017	Caste is Not a Rumour			Executive	Documentary
2017	Submerged			Executive	Documentary
2017	Yeh Ballet			Executive	Documentary
2017	When Borders Move			Executive	Documentary
2018	Tailored			Yes	
2019	Wintergreen			Yes	

=== Feature films ===
Year	Film	Contribution	Awards/Notes
2013	Ship of Theseus	Director / Writer / Producer	National Film Awards – Best Film; Hong Kong International Film Festival – SIGNIS Award (Special Mention); London International Film Festival – Sutherland Award (Special Mention); Screen Weekly Awards – Jury Prize; Transylvania International Film Festival – Best Film; Sakhalin Film Festival – Grand Prix; Mumbai Film Festival – Jury Prize for Technical Excellence; Tokyo International Film Festival – Best Artistic Contribution Award
2017	An Insignificant Man	Producer	Toronto International Film Festival BFI London Film Festival Busan International Film Festival International Documentary Film Festival Amsterdam Warsaw International Film Festival - Best Documentary New York Indian Film Festival Indian Film Festival of Los Angeles Brooklyn Film Festival Sheffield Doc/Fest AFI Docs Copenhagen International Documentary Festival International Film Festival and Forum on Human Rights Directed by Khushboo Ranka and Vinay Shukla
2018	Helicopter Eela	Co-Writer	Directed by Pradeep Sarkar
2018	Tumbbad	Director/ Co-writer / Creative Director / Executive Producer	CinemAsia Film Festival Filmfare Awards International Indian Film Academy Awards Directed alongside Rahi Anil Barve
2022	While We Watched	Producer	Amplify Voices Award Busan Cinephile Award Best Documentary Film at Peabody Awards

=== Television ===
Year	Title	Creator	Writer	Producer
2000-2002	Kyunki Saas Bhi Kabhi Bahu Thi		Yes	
2000	Kahaani Ghar Ghar Kii		Yes	
2021	OK Computer		Yes(Co-writer)	Yes

== Awards and recognition ==
In 2000, Gandhi's play Sugandhi, written when he was 19, received a national-level theatre award. In 2013, Gandhi was selected as an INK Fellow, a programme recognizing individuals for their contributions and innovation and received the Contribution to Jain Philosophy Prize from the University of Mumbai.

In 2013, Ship of Theseus won the Transilvania Trophy (Best Film) at the Transilvania International Film Festival, the film subsequently won the Golden Lotus (Swarna Kamal) for Best Feature Film at the 61st National Film Awards. It later received the SIGNIS Award at the Hong Kong International Film Festival.

In 2017, An Insignificant Man won the Best Documentary award at the Warsaw International Film Festival, while Tumbbad received the Best Film – Focus Asia award at the 2018 Sitges Film Festival and the Vicious Cat Award for Best Feature Film at the 2019 Grossmann Fantastic Film and Wine Festival. In 2022, Gandhi served on the jury of The One Show, an international awards programme.

== Personal life ==
Gandhi writes Gujarati poetry but does not publish it.
