= Zain Memon =

Indian game designer

- Born: Mumbai, Maharashtra, India
- Citizenship: Indian
- Education: High school dropout (12th grade)
- Occupations: Game designer; Writer; Media producer; Entrepreneur
- Years active: 2015–present
- Organization(s): Memesys Culture Lab; Department of Lore
- Known for: Co-founder of Memesys Culture Lab; Creator of SHASN and SHASN: AZADI; Creator of Macaraccoon; Co-creator of the MAYA narrative universe

Zain Memon is an Indian game designer, writer, and media producer. He is the co-founder of Memesys Culture Lab, a studio and publisher that develops films, board games, literature, and virtual reality (VR) experiences. He is also the co-founder of Department of Lore, a studio that develops narrative projects across film, publishing, and digital media. Memon is the designer of the political strategy board games SHASN and SHASN: AZADI.

He is also the co-creator, alongside filmmaker Anand Gandhi, of MAYA, an expansive narrative universe and transmedia franchise spanning novels, graphic novels, tabletop games, and films.

== Early life and background ==
Zain grew up in Versova, Mumbai. He left formal education before completing higher secondary school and pursued his interests in science, technology, media, and storytelling.

== Career ==
=== Mixed media and filmmaking (2015–2018) ===
In early 2015, Memon worked on the development of ElseVR, a virtual reality platform focused on documentary storytelling and long-form journalism. Later that year, he co-founded Memesys Culture Lab, a media studio, with filmmaker Anand Gandhi, Khushboo Ranka, Vinay Shukla, Neil Pagedar, and Pooja Shetty.

Memon served as creative director for Cost of Coal (2016), a non-fiction virtual reality documentary directed by Faiza Ahmad Khan and produced by Memesys Culture Lab. He also managed the crowdfunding campaign for the political documentary film An Insignificant Man (2016). Memon was later credited as a producer on An Insignificant Man and While We Watched.

=== Tabletop game design (2019–present) ===
In 2019, Memon began designing tabletop games with the release of SHASN, a political strategy board game exploring democratic decision-making and electoral politics. The game was funded through Kickstarter and later received the Social Impact Award at IndieCade Europe in 2019.

In 2021, Memon and game designer Abhishek Lamba launched SHASN: AZADI, a standalone sequel to SHASN. The game received the Best Board or Tabletop Game for Impact award at the 2023 Games for Change Awards.

In 2025, Memon released Macaraccoon, a tile-drafting board game centred on a competitive baking theme.

=== Transmedia expansion ===
In 2021, Zain Memon, with co-creator Anand Gandhi, began developing MAYA, a transmedia storytelling project. The first novel, MAYA: Seed Takes Root, is scheduled to be published by Authors Equity on 25 August 2026, with distribution by Simon & Schuster.

== Works ==
=== Board games ===
Release	Game	Publisher	Description
2019	SHASN	Memesys Games	A game of politics, ethics, and strategy for 2-5 players designed to teach how modern democracies work.
2021	SHASN:AZADI	Memesys Games	A semi-cooperative game for 2-5 players designed to teach stories from historical political revolutions.
2025	Macaraccoon	Memesys Games	A competitive tile-drafting puzzle game centred on baking and resource optimization.

=== Literature and transmedia ===
- MAYA (2025–present): Co-creator (with Anand Gandhi); an ongoing narrative universe encompassing novels, graphic novels, and interactive media.
- MAYA: Seed Takes Root (2026): Co-author (with Anand Gandhi); published by Authors Equity, distributed by Simon & Schuster.
