= Latitudes of Longing =

2018 novel by Shubhangi Swarup

- Author: Shubhangi Swarup
- Publication date: 2018
- ISBN: 978-9-353-02026-2

Latitudes of Longing is the debut novel by Indian author and journalist Shubhangi Swarup. One of the first Indian novels to engage with environmental changes, it is a “novella in four parts” featuring nature as a living, heaving entity. A tectonically active fault line serves as the narrative thread for the novel. A literary fiction, the novel is set in the Indian subcontinent that follows the interconnected lives of its characters searching for true intimacy.

Swarup's first book, Latitudes of Longing was published in 2018 by HarperCollins Publishers India. Swarup began writing the manuscript in 2011, sitting alone in “a supposedly haunted guesthouse” in the Andaman Islands. In an interview published in The Hindu, Swarup mentioned that it took her seven years to write Latitudes of Longing. Swarup was awarded the Charles Pick Fellowship for creative writing, University of East Anglia, 2012–13, which helped with her further research. The potential of the story was first recognised by writer and editor Rahul Soni at HarperCollins India, who put his weight behind the novel.

== Translations ==
Latitudes of Longing is in the process of being translated in 17 different languages and published in other countries.

== Plot ==
The book is made up of four linked novellas. Their titles—Islands, Faultline, Valley, and Snow Desert—suggest the book's emphasis on how people connect to their planet. Islands is the story of an arranged marriage between two very different people that grows into genuine love. Girija Prasad, India born and Oxford educated, is a man of science. His bride, Chanda Devi, has more education than many Indian women but is also a mystic who routinely speaks to ghosts and trees and can sometimes see the future. In the middle of the 20th century, Girija's government job takes them to the remote, wildly beautiful Andaman Islands, a penal colony under the British Empire that newly independent India is trying to figure out what to do with. Faultline delves into the lives of Mary, a Burmese woman who was Girija and Chanda's housekeeper, and her son, a political prisoner in Burma who has renamed himself Plato. Valley branches off from that section to follow Plato's best friend, a smuggler from Nepal. Thapa is “a man nearing sixty, besotted by a girl young enough to be his granddaughter” whom he meets in a dance bar in Kathmandu. Thapa's travels lead to the final section, Snow Desert, and the story of Apo, the aged leader of an isolated village in the icy Karakoram Mountains, in the no-man's land between Pakistan and India.

== Style ==
The jury for the Émile Guimet Prize for Asian Literature, when speaking of Latitudes of Longing, described the writing style as ‘deeply anchored in the culture of this region, where the landscape, the sea, the mountains and the main characters (two newlyweds, a melancholic yeti, a geologist, a turtle...) seem to invent a genre in itself: the "fiction of nature", a description Swarup agrees with. 'This is an ecological novel where humans, nature, geology, geopolitics and religion intertwine, where the stories seem to arise organically along a fault line that shakes the earth and everything it contains. Indian Ocean to the Himalayas.’

New York based writer and designer Taylor Poulos in his review for Guernica comments that 'Swarup eschews genres such as magical realism, as she believes that the basis of her writing is nature, and by describing it as ‘magical’, we are denying the reality of the planet. The publisher markets Latitudes of Longing as a fairy tale, and indeed, ghosts, spirits, and the supernatural abound. But with its in-depth understanding of plate tectonics, forestry, and biology, the novel also feels like science fiction. Although the two genres might first seem at odds, Swarup teases out the ways in which the supernatural hallows nature.'

Additionally, the writing style has been described as magical realism and ecological fiction. Kalyani Hazri, in her thematic analysis paper of Latitudes of Longing, wrote:

“Latitudes of Longing can be read as a discourse on love that challenges the strict gender divisions and explores the new contours of sexuality. It also destabilizes any fixed notion of nation. Woven into four loosely related narratives, it tells the story of different couples who challenge prescribed social norms and yet their love reaches the divine height in the sense of being eternal. In fact, the novel reflects upon the relationship of gender and nation and explores the ways they are related.”

== Reception and awards ==
Soon after its release, Latitudes of Longing was declared a bestseller in India, as well as in Sweden. The book was also selected by the GOOP book club and Oprah Daily in 2020, and its Taiwanese translation was selected by the Eslite chain of bookstores, Taipei as their November book of the month. Additionally, the Polish translation of the book won a grant under the Patronage Program of Krakow City of Literature UNESCO.

Awards for Latitudes of Longing
Year	Award	Result	Ref.
2018	JCB Prize for Literature	Shortlist	
2018	Tata Literature Live! First Book Award - Debut Fiction	Winner	
2019	DSC Prize for South Asian Literature	Longlist	
2020	International Dublin Literary Award	Longlist	
2020	Sushila Devi Literature Award for Best Book of Fiction Written By A Woman	Winner	
2022	Émile Guimet Prize for Asian Literature	Winner	
