= Ng Kim Chew =

Malaysian-Taiwanese writer and academic

- 黃錦樹
- Born: November 9, 1967 (age 58); Johor, Malaysia
- Citizenship: Taiwanese
- Occupations: Novelist, writer
- Writing career
- Language: Chinese

Chinese name
- Traditional Chinese: 黃錦樹
- Simplified Chinese: 黄锦树
Transcriptions
Standard Mandarin
- Hanyu Pinyin: Huáng Jǐnshù
Yue: Cantonese
- Jyutping: Wong4 Gam2 Syu6
Southern Min
- Hokkien POJ: N̂g Kím-chhiū
- Tâi-lô: N̂g Kím-tshiū

Ng Kim Chew (simplified Chinese: 黄锦树; traditional Chinese: 黃錦樹; pinyin: Huáng Jǐnshù; Jyutping: Wong4 Gam2 Syu6; Pe̍h-ōe-jī: N̂g Kím-chhiū; born 1967) is a Chinese-Malaysian author of short fiction and literary scholar who lives in Taiwan.

== Life ==
Born in Johor, Malaysia, Ng migrated to Taiwan to attend National Taiwan University in 1989. After earning his doctorate from National Tsing Hua University, Ng became a professor of Chinese literature at National Chi Nan University.

== Career ==
Despite residing and publishing in Taiwan, Ng's short fiction is largely set in Southeast Asia. His stories explore language and literary history, interethnic and religious politics, indigenous and diasporic nationalism, exile, migration, and hybridity. Ng's short fiction is typically highly ironic, satirical, and farcical.

Ng has published several short story collections. He has won numerous awards for his fiction, including the United Daily Literary Award and the China Times Literary Award. In 2021, Ng was awarded the Émile Guimet Prize for Asian Literature for his collection of short stories, Rain (雨).

== Selected works ==
=== Works in Chinese ===
- Dreams, Pigs, and Dawn (夢與豬與黎明, 1994)
- Dark Nights (烏暗暝, 后浪, 1997) (ISBN 978-7-532-17400-3)
- From Island to Island: Carved Spins (由島至島, 2001)
- Earth and Fire: The Land of the Malay People (土與火, 2005)
- Die in the South (死在南方, 山东文艺出版社, 2007) (ISBN 978-7-532-92654-1)
- Memorandums of the South Seas People's Republic (南洋人民共和國備忘錄, 2013)
- Carved Back (刻背, 2014)
- Still Seeing Fuyu (猶見扶餘, 2014)
- Fish (魚, 2015)
- Rain (雨, 寶瓶文化, 2016) (ISBN 978-7-220-10513-5)
- Slow Boat to China (民國的慢船, 2019)
- The River Where Elephants Died (大象死去的河邊, 2021)

=== Translated works ===
- Slow Boat to China and Other Stories (Columbia University Press, 2016), translated by Carlos Rojas (ISBN 978-0-231-16812-0)
- Pluie (Philippe Picquier Publishing), 2020), translated by Pierre-Mong Lim (ISBN 978-2-809-71500-2)
