= Right Here, Right Now (film) =

Right Here Right Now
- Directed by: Anand Gandhi
- Produced by: ReCyclewala Productions
- Music by: Sachin Sanghvi
- Release date: June 2003
- Running time: 29 minutes
- Country: India
- Language: Hindi

Right Here Right Now is a short film written and directed by Anand Gandhi. It earned critical acclaim and wide audience appreciation in the following years at the Indo-British Film and Video Festival. It has achieved a near-cult status in the Indian parallel cinema.

== Synopsis ==
- How a one act of bad experience generates the chain of bad experiences.
- How a one act of good experience generates the chain of good experiences.

== Cast ==
- Anuradha Chandan as Mother
- Rupesh Tillu as Rickshawwala
- Tushar Joshi as Uncle
- Trishla Patel as the Girl in love
- Parul Bheda as Maidservant
- Induben Mehta as the Granny

== Awards and festivals ==
- Winner, Best Film (International Short), Syracuse International Film Festival, NY
- Winner, Best Film (Audience Choice Award), shnit shortfilmfestival, Switzerland
- Winner, Best Film of the Year award at the Mocha Film Club, Mumbai
- Official Selection, Tribeca International Film Festival, NY
- Official Selection, Rome International Film Festival
- Official Selection, Indo-British Digital Short Film Festival, India

== Music trivia ==
- All the soundtracks are original scores composed for the film by Sachin Sanghvi.
- The voices in the songs "Jheeni" & "Red Blossom Cherry" are Sachin Sanghvi, Naresh Iyer and Amit Trivedi.
- "Jheeni" is a modified lyric from the 15th Century mystic poet Kabir's song "Jheeni re chadariya".
- The song "Red Blossom Cherry" is inspired from a Zen Story. In the story, a man is being chased by a vicious snake until he reaches the edge of a cliff. He jumps from the fear of the snake, and clings to a tree. There's a landing ground below, but before he can land, he hears a lion's roar from below. The branch he's clinging to starts dangling. In the midst of all this, he spots a Cherry. He plucks it and eats it. The snake of the past, the lion of the future and the cherry of now!
