= Shubhangi Swarup =

Indian author, journalist and educator

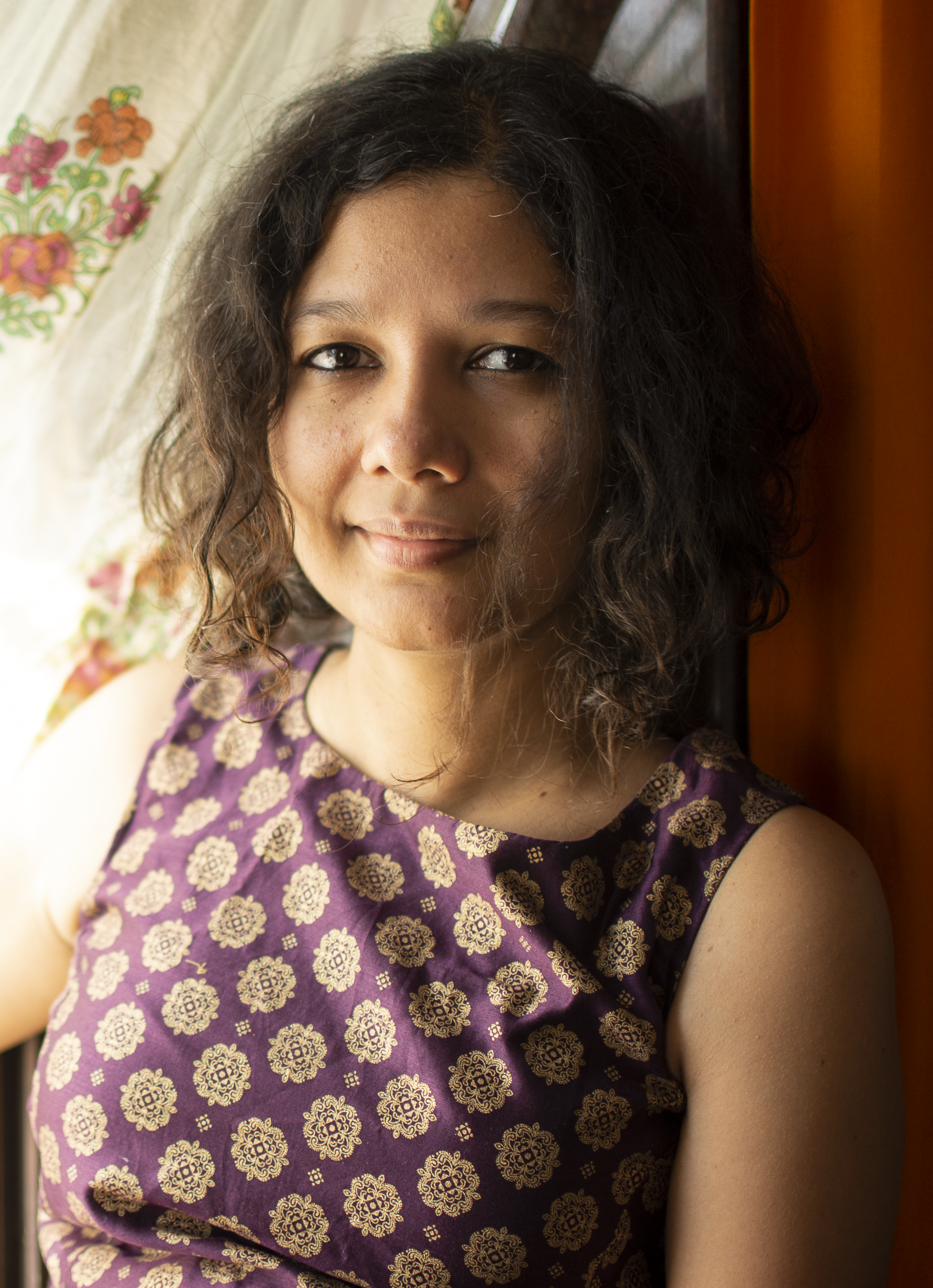
- Swarup in Mumbai, 2018
- Born: 1982 (age 43–44); Nashik, Maharashtra
- Education: St. Anne's High School, Fort, Mumbai
- Alma mater: St. Xavier's College (Mumbai), SOAS University of London
- Notable work: Latitudes of Longing
- Website: shubhangiswarup.com

Shubhangi Swarup (Hindi: शुभांगी स्वरुप; IPA - ʃʊbʰɑ́ŋgiː svəruːp) is an Indian author, journalist and educator. She is best known for her novel Latitudes of Longing, which was published in 2018 by HarperCollins and was declared a bestseller soon after its release in India, and Sweden.

Swarup has worked as a journalist since 2008, and has written for Open, The Mint and also worked briefly in Zanzibar in 2011.

She was the Executive Editor for ElseVR channel, India's first virtual reality (VR) journalism platform co-created by filmmaker and producer Anand Gandhi. In this capacity, she directed and wrote When Borders Move, a documentary about Hunderman, a village in Kargil that once belonged to Pakistan, was shortly in no man’s land, and now belongs to India.

As part of the Dekeyser and Friend’s Dance Project, Swarup was part of Fire of Anatolia, a Turkish dance group consisting of 120 dancers, several choreographers and other technical staff. Additionally, she has volunteered as a teacher for street children and low income groups, and co-founded the community group, Hamara Footpath, a Mumbai-based NGO dedicated to the educational needs of children who live on Mumbai’s streets.

Swarup was born in Nashik to Sunanda Swarup and Govind Swarup in 1982. She holds a Masters of Sciences degree in Violence, Conflict and Development from SOAS University of London.

== Notable works ==
=== Latitudes of Longing (2018) ===
Swarup began work on her first book in 2011. In an interview published in The Hindu, she mentioned that it took her seven years to write the novel, and that her training as a journalist taught her ‘the value of deadlines, and sticking to them in the face of uncertainty.’.

Latitudes of Longing is among the first Indian novels to engage with nature as a living, heaving entity. A tectonically active fault-line running through the Indian subcontinent holds all the stories together, in lieu of a plot. Winner of the Émile Guimet Prize for Asian Literature, the jury observed that the novel has invented a genre in itself: the fiction of nature. Critically and commercially successful, the novel is in the process of being translated in 17 different languages. It was selected by the GOOP book club and Oprah Daily in 2020, and its Taiwanese translation was selected by the Eslite chain of bookstores, Taipei as their November book of the month.

=== Shikaar (2019) ===
Shikaar is a Hindi play conceptualized and co-written by Swarup in 2019. She wrote the story, and the play was produced by Patchworks Ensemble. Set among a group of chudails, the story explores the threat independent women pose to fascism. Shikaar received both popular and critical acclaim.

== Awards ==
Swarup was awarded the Charles Pick Fellowship for creative writing at the University of East Anglia, and the South Asia Laadli Media & Advertising Award for Gender Sensitivity twice for her articles - "The Many Perceptions of Rape", 2009 and "Stealth Revolution", 2012.

For Latitudes of Longing, she received the following awards and nominations -

- the 6th Émile Guimet Prize for Asian Literature, 2022
- won the Sushila Devi Literature Award for Best Book of Fiction Written By A Woman, 2020
- longlisted for International Dublin Literary Award, 2020
- longlisted for DSC Prize for South Asian Literature, 2019
- won the Tata Literature Live! First Book Award - Debut Fiction, 2018
- shortlisted for the inaugural JCB Prize for Literature, 2018

== Influences ==
Discussing her literary influences in an interview with Prakruti Maniar, Swarup cited Naguib Mahfouz and A.K. Ramanujan, specifically his short story collection A Flowering Tree for narrative style, as well as Haruki Murakami, Gabriel García Márquez and Maria Dermoût's The Ten Thousand Things, and other Japanese, Spanish and African literature.

Beyond literature, Swarup also credited filmmaker Hayao Miyazaki as a strong influence.
