= Crichlow =

Crichlow or Critchlow is a surname, and may refer to:

- Cherrie Ann Crichlow-Cockburn, Trinidad and Tobago politician
- Ernest Crichlow (1914–2005), African-American artist
- Frank Crichlow (1932–2010), British activist
- Herbie Crichlow (born 1968), English music producer and songwriter
- Jay Critch (born Jason Critchlow 1998), American rapper
- Kane Crichlow (born 2000), Bermudian footballer
- Kieran Crichlow (born 1981), Barbadian footballer
- Lenora Crichlow (born 1985), British actress
- Nathaniel Crichlow (1922–2006)
- Renn Crichlow (born 1968), Canadian kayaker
