= Hugo Critchley =

British psychiatrist

- Education: BSc (Physiology University of Liverpool; MB ChB (Medicine) University of Liverpool; DPhil (Psychological Studies University of Oxford
- Scientific career
- Fields: Basic and Clinical Neuroscience; Psychiatry
- Workplaces: Brighton and Sussex Medical School; University of Sussex; University of Brighton
- Website: www.sussex.ac.uk/profiles/198138

Hugo Critchley is a British professor of psychiatry at Brighton and Sussex Medical School, a partnership of the University of Brighton and the University of Sussex.

== Early life and education ==
Critchley spent childhood years in Blackburn, Lancashire. His father, Edmund Critchley, worked as a neurologist, and his mother, Mair Critchley, née Bowen, as a physician in nuclear medicine. Critchley went to the University of Liverpool, attaining degrees in Physiology (BSc 1987) and Medicine (MB ChB 1990). After a period as a junior doctor in Walton and Fazakerley Hospitals, he pursued doctorate training, studying cross-modal sensory processing in the prefrontal cortex at the Department of Experimental Psychology University of Oxford (DPhil 1996).

In 1995, Critchley entered training in psychiatry at St George's Hospital and then Kings College Institute of Psychiatry (now IoPPN), where he began using neuroimaging methods. In 1998, he moved to UCL Queen Square Institute of Neurology to pursue research on mind-brain-body interactions, working between the Functional Imaging Laboratory (Wellcome Department of Imaging Neuroscience) and the clinical Autonomic Unit at the National Hospital for Neurology and Neurosurgery. He completed his general training as a neuropsychiatrist in 2003 and gained a Wellcome Trust Senior Fellowship in Clinical Science in 2004.

== Career ==
Critchley was a principal at the Wellcome Department of Imaging Neuroscience and group leader at the UCL Institute of Cognitive Neuroscience, before he was appointed foundation chair in psychiatry at Brighton and Sussex Medical School in 2006. From 2010 to 2022, Critchley was co-director (with Anil Seth) of the Sackler / Sussex Centre for Consciousness Science. In 2013, Critchley was the recipient of an Advanced Grant from the European Research Council. He was head of the (then new) BSMS Department of Clinical Neuroscience from 2016 to 2022. Clinically, Critchley trained as an neuropsychiatrist and helped establish a service in 2006, for adult neurodevelopmental conditions (including Autism, ADHD and developmental tics) at the Sussex Partnership NHS Foundation Trust, where he works as a psychiatrist.

== Publications ==
Critchley's highly cited research focuses primarily on mind-body-brain interactions. He has published widely on emotion, autonomic psychophysiology, interoception, and psychiatric symptoms. His most cited article described interoceptive representations in the human brain

== Contributions and recognition ==
Critchley has been involved in the Academic Faculty of the Royal College of Psychiatrists which he chaired from 2019 to 2024, and he has previously served as a member of the Council of the American Psychosomatic Society. In 2006, he received the Neal Miller award from the Academy of Behavioral Medicine. In 2015, Critchley became a Fellow of the Royal College of Psychiatrists and, in 2017, he received the Paul D MacLean Award from the American Psychosomatic Society.
