= Hannah Critchlow =

British neuroscientist (born 1980)

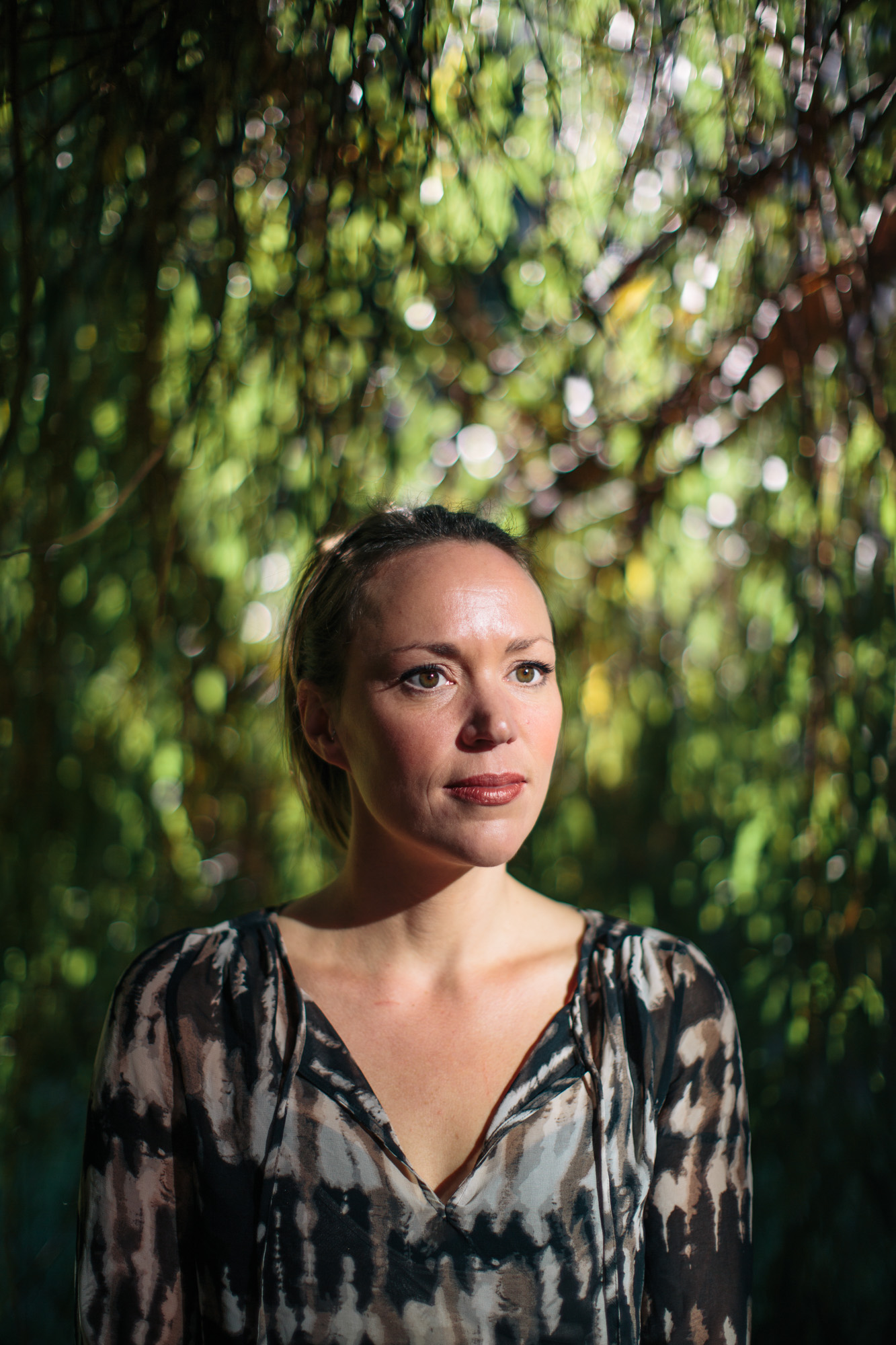
- Critchlow by the River Cam
- Born: Hannah Marion Critchlow; 1980 (age 45–46); Leicester, England
- Education: Brunel University (BSc); University of Cambridge (PhD)
- Children: 1
- Scientific career
- Fields: Neuroscience
- Workplaces: University of Cambridge; University of Oxford
- Thesis: The Role of Dendritic Spine Plasticity in Schizophrenia (2008)
- Website: neuroscience.cam.ac.uk/member/hannahcritchlow

Hannah Marion Critchlow (born 1980) is a British scientist, writer and broadcaster. Her academic research has focused on cellular and molecular neuroscience. In 2014 the Science Council named her as one of the ten leading "communicator scientists" in the UK. In 2019 Nature listed her as one of Cambridge Universities "Rising Stars in Biological Sciences". In 2022 she was awarded an Honorary Doctorate from Brunel University for her work in neuroscience and communication. In 2026 she is due to receive the Rosalind Franklin Medal from the Humanist Society.

== Early life and education ==
Critchlow decided on a career in neuroscience as a teenager after working as a nursing assistant at St Andrew's Hospital. She studied Cell and Molecular Biology at Brunel University, where she was awarded a First Class degree in 2003 along with three undergraduate University Prizes. While studying at Brunel she had secured a work placement from GlaxoSmithKline, who with the Medical Research Council provided a CASE Award for her doctoral studies at the University of Cambridge.

== Career and research ==
Following completion of her PhD, Critchlow spent a year as a Kingsley Bye-Fellow at Magdalene College, Cambridge and then a further year as a researcher at the Institute for the Future of the Mind, funded by the Oxford Martin School at the University of Oxford. In 2008 she returned to Cambridge, where she has been professionally based ever since, apart from a one-year secondment to the British Neuroscience Association in 2010–2011.

In parallel with her research career, Critchlow began to establish herself as an effective science communicator and public face of science. She took part in a Rising Stars programme run by the University of Cambridge's Public Engagement team in 2011 and, together with the cosmologist Andrew Pontzen, produced a series of Naked Shorts on their research for the award-winning podcast The Naked Scientists. A series of talks developed by Critchlow to take to schools and public festivals led to her giving a talk on "brain myths" at the Hay Literary Festival in 2015 that attracted national and international media interest. This led in turn to her being commissioned by Penguin Books to write an introductory book on Consciousness and to presenting Tomorrow's World Live for the BBC and Family Brain Games. In 2017 Critchlow was appointed as a Science Outreach Fellow by Magdalene College, Cambridge She was a judge for the 2018 Wellcome Book Prize. In 2019 she was elected member of the prestigious European Dana Alliance of the Brain and named by Nature as one of Cambridge University's 'Rising Stars in Life Sciences' in recognition for her achievements in science engagement. That same year her second book was published called The Science of Fate and made it onto the Sunday Times Bestseller list. Her third book Joined up Thinking was published in 2022 to critical acclaim.

== Publications ==
=== Books ===
- Critchlow, Hannah (30 April 2026). The 21st Century Brain: Cutting edge neuroscience to help us navigate the future. Torva. ISBN 9781911709961.
- Critchlow, Hannah (25 August 2022). Joined up Thinking: The Power of Collective Intelligence to Change Our Lives. Hodder & Stoughton. ISBN 9781529398397.
- Critchlow, Hannah (2 May 2019). The Science of Fate: Why Your Future is More Predictable Than You Think. Hodder & Stoughton. ISBN 978-1473659285.
- Critchlow, Hannah (14 June 2018). Consciousness. illus. Stephen Player. London, England: Penguin, Ladybird Books. ISBN 978-0-7181-8911-2.

=== Selected articles ===
- Critchlow, Hannah M; Herrington, Paul; Gunton, Simon (1 February 2012). "Inside an unquiet mind: Music and science join forces to explore mental ill health". EMBO Reports. 13 (2): 95–99. doi:10.1038/embor.2011.255. PMC 3271342. PMID 22240971.
- Critchlow, HM; Maycox, PR; Skepper, JN; Krylova, O (August 2006). "Clozapine and haloperidol differentially regulate dendritic spine formation and synaptogenesis in rat hippocampal neurons". Molecular and Cellular Neuroscience. 32 (4): 356–365. doi:10.1016/j.mcn.2006.05.007. PMID 16844384. S2CID 33783762.
- Critchlow, HM; Payne, A; Griffin, DK (August 2006). "Genes and proteins involved in the control of meiosis". Cytogenetic and Genome Research. 105 (1): 4–10. doi:10.1159/000078002. PMID 15218251. S2CID 46245478.
