= Hilary Critchley =

British obstetrician and gynaecologist

Hilary Octavia Dawn Critchley FRSE FRSB FMedSci FFSRH FRCOG FRANZCOG
- Education: University of Manchester
- Occupations: medical doctor and academic
- Medical career
- Institutions: University of Edinburgh
- Sub-specialties: obstetrics and gynaecology, reproductive medicine

Hilary Octavia Dawn Critchley is a Scottish obstetrician and gynaecologist. as of 2014, she is the Professor of Reproductive Medicine and an Honorary Consultant in Obstetrics and Gynaecology at the University of Edinburgh.

== Education ==
Critchley earned a B.S. (1978) and a Bachelor of Medicine and Bachelor of Surgery (1981) from the University of Manchester. She earned the degree of Doctor of Medicine, also from the University of Manchester, in 1991.

== Career and research ==
She was appointed as the Head of School of Clinical Sciences in August 2012. She has published over 200 peer-reviewed articles in scientific journals.

Critchley's research focusses on local uterine mechanisms involved in menstruation and implantation, and addresses the mechanisms common to those reproductive processes – injury and repair, endocrine–immune interactions and regulation of inflammatory mediators. A particular area of interest has been the local endometrial response to withdrawal of progesterone, both physiological and pharmacological.

== Awards and honours ==
In 2019, Critchley was one of the women in science profiled in an exhibit presented by the Royal Society of Edinburgh. In 2021, the Society for Reproductive Investigation awarded Critchley with the DeCherney Society LIfetime Distinguished Service Award. She was the Society for Reproduction and Fertility's Distinguished Scientist Lecturer in 2020.

She is an elected Fellow of the Royal Society of Edinburgh (2012) and the Academy of Medical Sciences (2009).

== Selected publications ==
- Critchley, Hilary O. D.; Brenner, Robert M.; Henderson, Teresa A.; Williams, Karin; Nayak, Nihar R.; Slayden, Ov D.; Millar, Michael R.; Saunders, Philippa T. K. (1 March 2001). "Estrogen Receptor β, But Not Estrogen Receptor α, Is Present in the Vascular Endothelium of the Human and Nonhuman Primate Endometrium1". The Journal of Clinical Endocrinology & Metabolism. 86 (3): 1370–1378. doi:10.1210/jcem.86.3.7317. ISSN 0021-972X. PMID 11238534.
- Jabbour, Henry N.; Kelly, Rodney W.; Fraser, Hamish M.; Critchley, Hilary O. D. (1 February 2006). "Endocrine Regulation of Menstruation". Endocrine Reviews. 27 (1): 17–46. doi:10.1210/er.2004-0021. ISSN 0163-769X. PMID 16160098.
- Munro, Malcolm G.; Critchley, Hilary O.D.; Broder, Michael S.; Fraser, Ian S.; for the FIGO Working Group on Menstrual Disorders (2011). "FIGO classification system (PALM-COEIN) for causes of abnormal uterine bleeding in nongravid women of reproductive age". International Journal of Gynecology & Obstetrics. 113 (1): 3–13. doi:10.1016/j.ijgo.2010.11.011. PMID 21345435.
- Wastnedge, Elizabeth A. N.; Reynolds, Rebecca M.; van Boeckel, Sara R.; Stock, Sarah J.; Denison, Fiona C.; Maybin, Jacqueline A.; Critchley, Hilary O. D. (1 January 2021). "Pregnancy and COVID-19". Physiological Reviews. 101 (1): 303–318. doi:10.1152/physrev.00024.2020. ISSN 0031-9333. PMC 7686875. PMID 32969772.
