= An Insignificant Man =

- Film poster
- Directed by: Khushboo Ranka; Vinay Shukla
- Written by: Khushboo Ranka; Vinay Shukla
- Produced by: Anand Gandhi; Khushboo Ranka; Vinay Shukla
- Starring: Arvind Kejriwal; Manish Sisodia; Yogendra Yadav; Santosh Koli
- Cinematography: Khushboo Ranka; Vinay Shukla
- Edited by: Abhinav Tyagi & Manan Bhatt
- Music by: Ola Fløttum
- Production companies: Friendly People, Memesys Culture Lab
- Release dates: September 2016 (Toronto); 17 November 2017
- Running time: 95 minutes
- Country: India
- Languages: Hindi; English

An Insignificant Man is a 2016 Hindi/English Indian socio-political documentary co-produced and directed by Khushboo Ranka and Vinay Shukla and also co-produced by filmmaker Anand Gandhi. and is about the rise of anti-corruption protests in India and the formation and rise to power of the Aam Aadmi Party (AAP). The film received a standing ovation at its premiere at the Toronto International Film Festival and has gone on to have sold out screenings at major festival across the world including the BFI London Film Festival & Busan International Film Festival.

The documentary chronicles the rise of the AAP, which was an independent Political faction that gained traction through campaigns against the corruption in Indian politics and was headed by political leader Arvind Kejriwal. It captures the day-to-day functioning of the AAP between December 2012 and December 2013, concluding with the Delhi elections. The film released in India on 17 November 2017. The film was earlier known as "Proposition for a Revolution".

== Crowdfunding ==
The movie was first conceived by Khushboo Ranka and Vinay Shukla as a way to continue the theme of documenting uprisings and protests happening around the world. Several documentaries had released about the Occupy Wallstreet movement in the United States, the Arab Spring protests in the Middle East and Northern Africa, and the protests of sovereignty and political corruption in Ukraine, however there had not been a major documentary done about the Jan Lokpal protest movement in India.

The makers of "An Insignificant Man" posted a 'plea' on their film site, making a case for the importance of their documentary, stating, "When we began shooting, nobody knew what lay in the future. Least of all, us. Today, we feel, we have a film that is a critical document, observing not just the evolution of a political party, but the gradual shift that we are beginning to witness in our political discourse. In the last year, we have been helped by friends who moved cities and jobs to work on this film and by colleagues who brought in their own resources. We managed to win the prestigious IDFA Bertha Grant for documentaries. We now come to you. Your support will enable us to make a better quality film in lesser time. It will also ensure that nothing can stop this film from reaching you. Please be a part of this conversation, and help us take it further. We have a host of exciting incentives too, do check them out on our page. We finished shooting a few months ago and now we need your help to take our film through post-production." The film's site explains, "What is unique in the Indian story is that some of the protesters decided to form a political party and fight state-wide elections in New Delhi. This is the story of the Aam Aadmi Party or the Common Man’s Party. "An Insignificant Man" aims to chronicle the journey of the party from its formation in December 2012 to the Delhi state elections in December 2013."

The crowdfunding campaign received unprecedented support. While the filmmakers had an initial goal of $20,000, they went on to receive a staggering $120,000, nearly 600% over their target. This was the largest crowdfunding campaign of its kind in India, hosted by the filmmakers on their own platform.

== Production ==
The production of the film is being done through crowdfunding. This form of production has become increasingly popular in Indian cinema due to the rise of a major independent film movement in the country. When asked in an interview with The Hindu, a major newspaper in India, on why the team chose crowdfunding, Shukla said "Our film is a documentary set in contemporary politics and investors didn't find it an interesting proposition. Those interested in investing wanted to know if we were supporting AAP or against it," Not wanting to compromise the neutral stand of their film, the team opted for crowd funding.

The film has won support from the Sundance Institute, IDFA & Asian Network of Documentary Fund. The film was selected for and won awards at the Hot Docs Forum Toronto, NFDC Film Bazaar WIP Lab & DocEdge Kolkata.

== Censorship in India ==
The film was initially denied a theatrical release in India by the Central Board of Film Certification (CBFC). The filmmakers were directed by the board to get a No-Objection Certificate (NOC) from Prime Minister Narendra Modi, Arvind Kejriwal, former Delhi CM Sheila Dikshit. Further, the board had also asked them to remove references to the two biggest political parties in India, Congress and BJP from the documentary. Responding to the CBFC directive, Ranka said, "We are definitely not going to ask for NOCs from the PM or the CM. It would set a wrong precedent, apart from doing something unethical. It is not in the purview of the CBFC to protect the feelings of politicians. It is bizarre that one has to take their permission to critique or document their political activities." In response, the filmmakers also launched a censorship awareness campaign which was supported by International Documentary Association(IDA) and European Documentary Network (EDN).

The filmmakers later appealed to Film Certification Appellate Tribunal. The tribunal agreed with the filmmakers' point of view that an NOC would defeat the purpose of a documentary and passed a landmark verdict in favour of the filmmakers. "There is considerable merit in the submission of the Appellant that requiring NOC from public personalities would cull the documentary cinema, rather render the making of a documentary on political scenario nigh impossible", the tribunal stated. "In these circumstances, requiring a filmmaker to obtain an NOC from the affected parties or characters in the film to whom references are made, is tantamount to the CBFC abdicating its statutory functions. This is neither desirable nor permissible at law." About muting the names of political parties, the FCAT said, "Public interest is best served in upholding the Right to Freedom of Expression rather than protecting an undeserved reputation." The film finally was cleared by the tribunal with a U/A certificate without any cuts.

== Release ==
The film was released in theatres in India on 17 November 2017. Originally released in a limited number of theatres, the film was expanded to a nationwide release owing to great critical reception and box office collections in the first week. From there, it ran for 8 successive weeks in theatres, making it one of the most successful documentaries in India ever. The film has been acquired by Vice for a global television and digital release.

== Reception ==
Business Standard wrote that the documentary "reminds one of Jehane Noujaim's Oscar-nominated documentary The Square which took a compelling look at the protests at Cairo’s Tahrir Square." Screen Daily commented that "Combining exceptional access and deft editing, this documentary about the rise of India’s newest parliamentary party, the Common Man’s Party (AAP), and the divisive, charismatic man at its heart, makes for unexpectedly riveting viewing."

Huffington Post listed the film among 12 Must-See Documentaries About Current World Politics. NDTV carried out promotional debates regarding the film. In spite of tough competition from big commercial releases, the film went on to have a good theatrical run and has been loved by audiences.

Reza Noorani writing for The Times of India praises the flawless editing, stating "Editing by Abhinav Tyagi and Manan Bhatt is clearly the strongest part of the entire documentary. The way they have maintained a coherent narrative makes you feel as if you’re watching a taut thriller; they keep you glued till the very last moment." Noorani gave the film a 4 out of 5 rating.

On review aggregator Rotten Tomatoes, the film has a 90% approval rating based on reviews from 10 critics.

=== Accolades ===
TIFF 2016, IDFA 2016, BFI London Film Festival 2016, CPH:DOX 2016,FIFDH 2017, AFI Docs 2017 and Sheffield Doc/Fest 2017. It won Best Documentary prize at Warsaw Film Festival 2016, NYIFF 2017,IFFLA 2017and Brooklyn Film Festival 2017.

=== Legacy ===
The board game Shasn was inspired by the making of An Insignificant Man.
