= Shasn =

Board game

SHASN
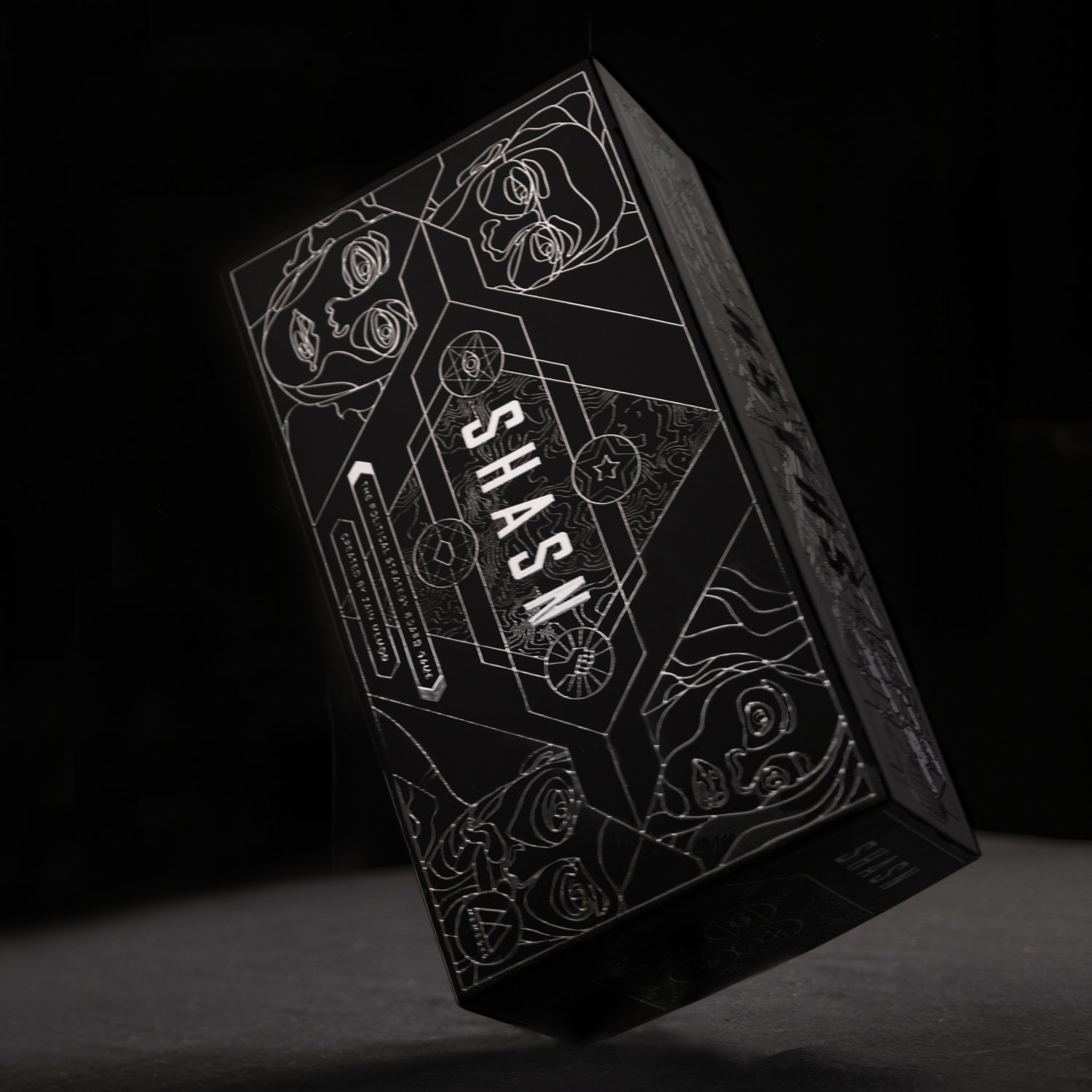
- Board game
- Designers: Zain Memon
- Publishers: Memesys Culture Lab
- Publication: 16 July 2019
- Genres: Board game, Political strategy game
- Players: 2–5
- Playing time: 90–180 minutes (2 player); 4-6 hours (5 player)
- Skills: Strategy, Negotiation, Area Control, Resource management
- Website: shasnthegame.com

SHASN (transl. Governance) is a multiplayer political strategy board game created by Zain Memon, and published by Memesys Culture Lab, where each player takes on the role of a politician contesting elections and is required to take a stand on various political and ethical issues. The game was launched on the global crowdfunding platform, Kickstarter on 16 July 2019, and raised $339,045 from 4,209 backers. SHASN was inspired by the documentary An Insignificant Man, on the rise of the Aam Aadmi Party politician and Delhi chief minister Arvind Kejriwal.

== Gameplay ==
SHASN is a competitive strategy board game played between two and five players which gives players an opportunity to influence the maximum number of majority voters in the 9 zones (or constituencies) on the game board. Voters are influenced via combinations of resources such as funds, clout, media, and trust. These resources are gained by answering questions on the Ideology Cards which are about real-world political, social, and ethical issues. The game ends when a majority has been formed in all possible zones on the board.

There are 4 ideologies in the game including The Capitalist, The Supremo, The Showstopper (originally called The Showman), and The Idealist. Players gain Ideology Cards by answering questions.

The type of ideology card players gain depends on which ideology their chosen answer falls under. Within the game, The Capitalist focuses on free trade, The Supremo focuses on identity politics, The Showstopper focuses on gaining media attention through shock tactics, and The Idealist focuses on making the world a better place. If the players gain 2, 3, or 5 cards of one ideology, they gain powers specific to that ideology.

== Development and Release ==
The development of the game began in January 2018 and continued over the course of one and a half years. Anand Gandhi is the executive producer of SHASN. The game was also produced by Vinay Shukla and Khushboo Ranka.

As of September 2021, three editions of SHASN have been launched- Standard Edition, Essential Edition, and the Founder's Edition. Taking players across many nations and eras, SHASN launched with 5 campaigns - India 2020, USA 2020, UK 2019-20: Brexit, Fall Of The Republic: Rome 40 BCE, and The Future Of Humanity: Earth 2040.

== Standalone Expansion ==
SHASN: AZADI, co-designed by Abhishek Lamba and Zain Memon was launched on Kickstarter on 8 September 2021. It met its funding goal within an hour, and went on to raise over $200,000 over the course of its campaign.

AZADI brought stories of revolution from across the world to the fore. It launched with 5 campaigns:

- Indian Independence 1947,
- Russian Revolution 1917,
- American Revolution 1776,
- Egyptian Revolution 2011, and
- Mars: 2165.

Since its launch, campaigns for the French Revolution, Indus Valley Revolution, and an undisclosed campaign depicting an ongoing struggle have been made available as additional campaigns.

== Awards ==
Year	Award	Category	Ref(s)
2019	IndieCade Europe 2019	Social Impact Award	
2019	TENTACCOLADE Award 2019	Best Campaign Video	

== Tournaments ==
In 2019, the first Shasn tournament was organized by the game creators. Subsequent tournaments were postponed due to the COVID-19 pandemic. Tournaments resumed again in 2023.

=== Season 1 (2019) ===
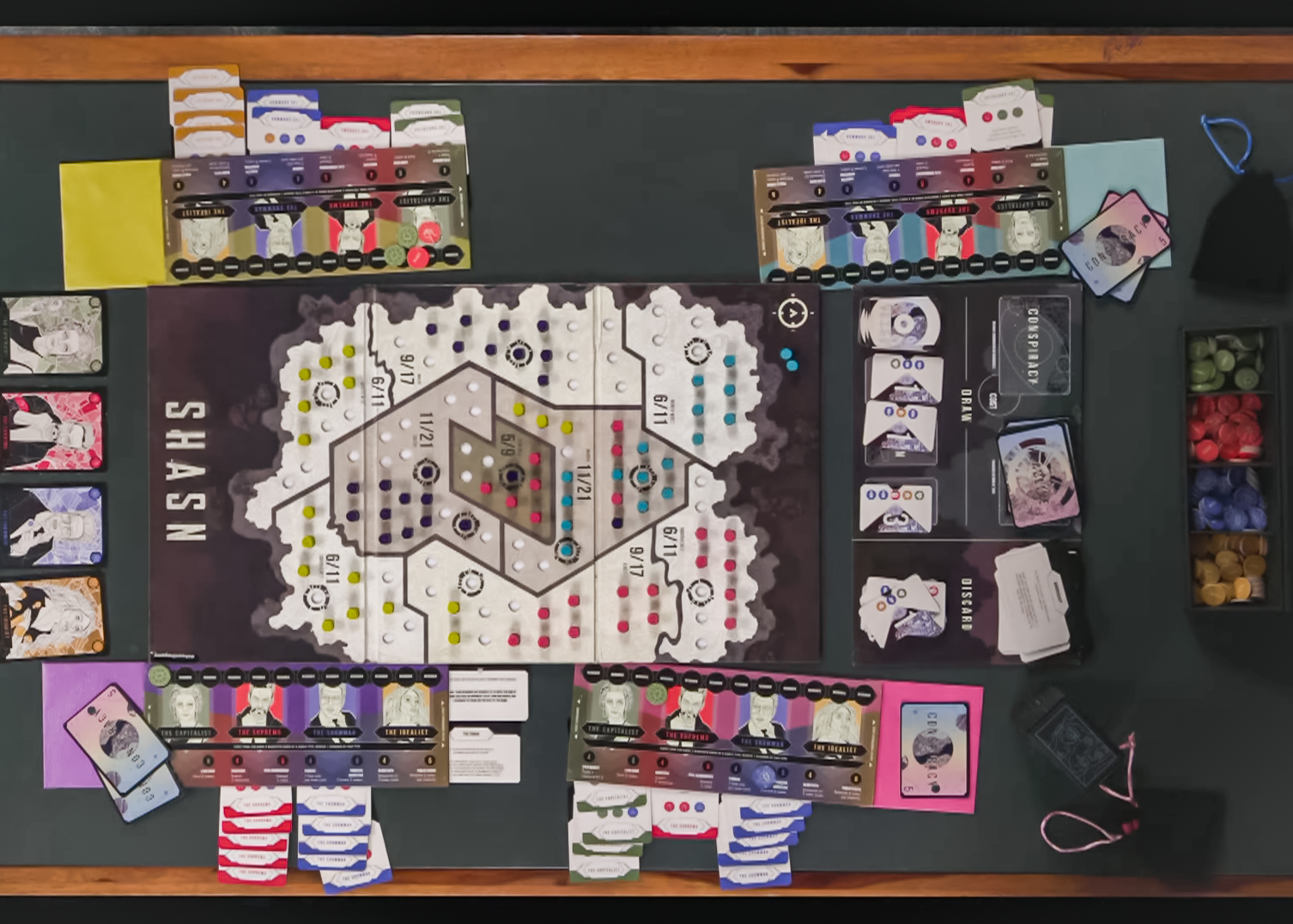
Winning board from 2019 Finals

For the first official Shasn tournament, 8 semi-finalists were selected from the following 4 cities (2 semi-finalists per city): Bengaluru, Delhi, Hyderabad, and Mumbai. These 8 semi-finalists then played against each other in two tables; each table having a semi-finalist from each of the 4 cities. The semi-final winners were as follows:

- Table 1: Adil Aziz (Mumbai) and Sahil Parsekar (Delhi)
- Table 2: Austino Paul (Bengaluru) and Viraj Kaoshal (Delhi)

These 4 finalists then had a final match in Mumbai on 15 August 2019. The winner was Austino Paul (Bengaluru).

Rank	Name	City/State	Score	Voters	Ideology cards
1st	Austino Paul	Bengaluru	20 points (3 zones) + 3 points (coalition zone)	23	4 capitalist, 1 supremo, 5 showstopper, 0 idealist
2nd	Viraj Kaoshal	Delhi	20 points (2 zones)	22	0 capitalist, 5 supremo, 5 showstopper, 0 idealist
3rd	Adil Aziz	Mumbai	6 points (1 zone) + 8 points (coalition zone)	16	3 capitalist, 3 supremo, 3 showstopper, 0 idealist
4th	Sahil Parsekar	Delhi	12 points (2 zones)	18	2 capitalist, 1 supremo, 2 showstopper, 4 idealist

Austino won by taking control of the central zone (5/9) while holding majorities in the 6/11 and 9/17 zones and being in a coalition majority with Adil in the 11/21 zone. The coalition scoring was split 8 points to Adil and 3 points to Austino.

Note: the ability to create majorities using a coalition has been cut from subsequent versions of the game.

=== Season 2 (2023) ===
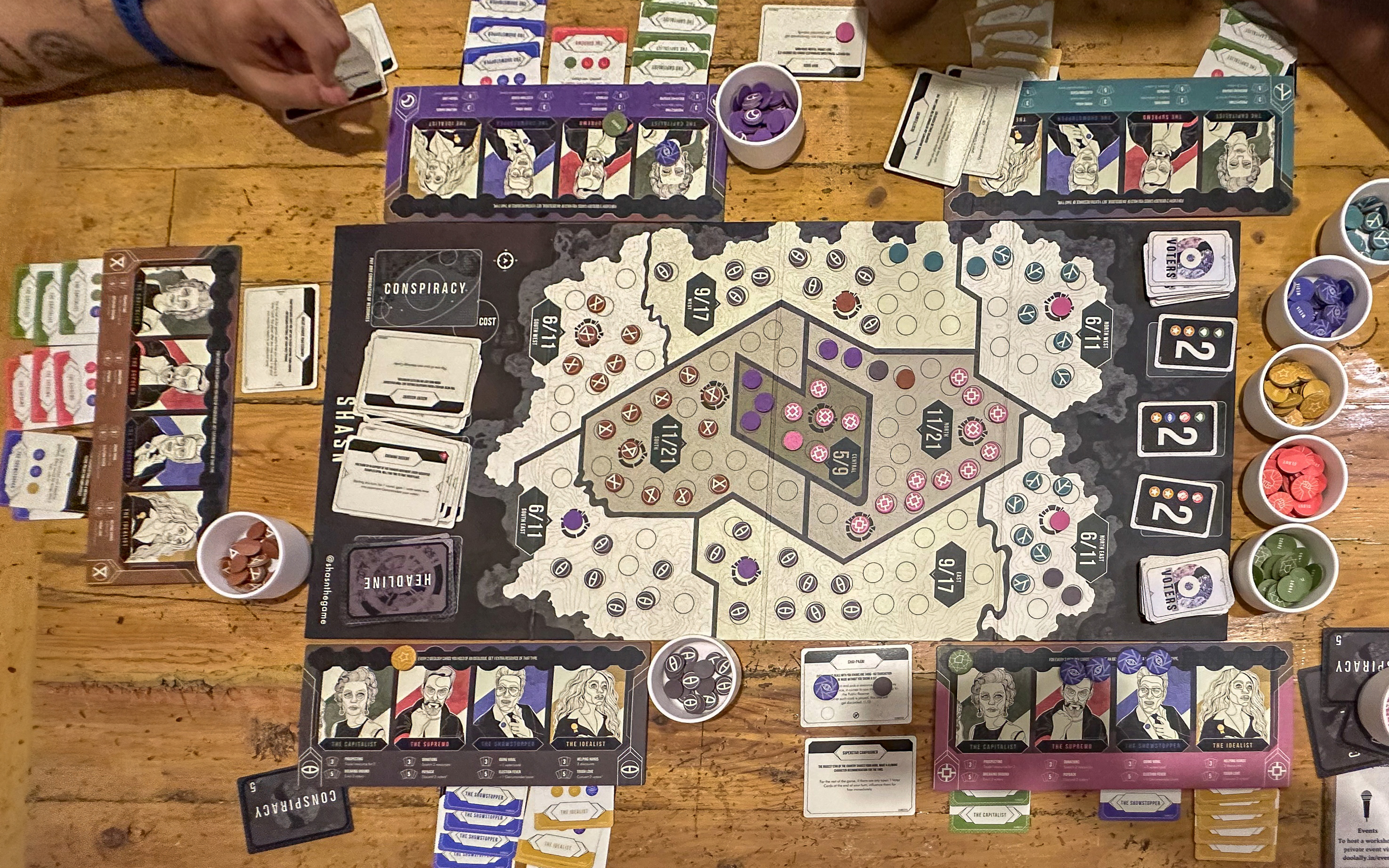
Winning board from 2023 Finals

The second official Shasn tournament took place in India from November to December 2023. Five finalists were chosen from the following 5 cities/states (1 finalist per city/state): Ahmedabad, Bengaluru, Delhi, Goa, and Mumbai. The only returning finalist from last season was Sahil Parsekar. The finals happened on Friday, 15 December 2023 in Doolally Taproom in Mumbai using the new India 2022-23 campaign deck. The results were as follows:

Rank	Name	City/State	Score	Voters	Ideology cards
1st	Dhruvie	Bengaluru	24 points (3 zones)	27	0 capitalist, 0 supremo, 5 showstopper, 4 idealist
2nd	Anant Lamba	Delhi	17 points (2 zones)	19	3 capitalist, 3 supremo, 2 showstopper, 0 idealist
3rd	Jay Jarosz	Goa	16 points (2 zones)	19	2 capitalist, 0 supremo, 1 showstopper, 5 idealist
4th	Sahil Parsekar	Mumbai	12 points (2 zones)	15	3 capitalist, 0 supremo, 0 showstopper, 5 idealist
5th	Arsheya Joshi	Ahmedabad	0 points (0 zones)	7	4 capitalist, 1 supremo, 3 showstopper, 0 idealist

The prize for first place was a golden trophy and a 10,000 INR cheque. The prize for second place was a 5,000 INR cheque.

The tournament was won by Dhruvie by holding the 6/11 and 9/11 zones and completing the last 3 remaining majorities in a single turn. He did this by buying 9 voters and taking over the second 9/17 zone, gerrymandering Sahil into a majority in a 6/11 zone, and using Anant's "Cult-ivating Obedience" conspiracy card against him. The "Cult-ivating Obedience" card protects one of the majorities of the owner, but it also allows any other player to convert 3 of their voters as a cost to take the card for themself. Dhruvie converted 3 of his voters into Anant's voters, giving Anant a majority in the 11/21 zone and ending the game.

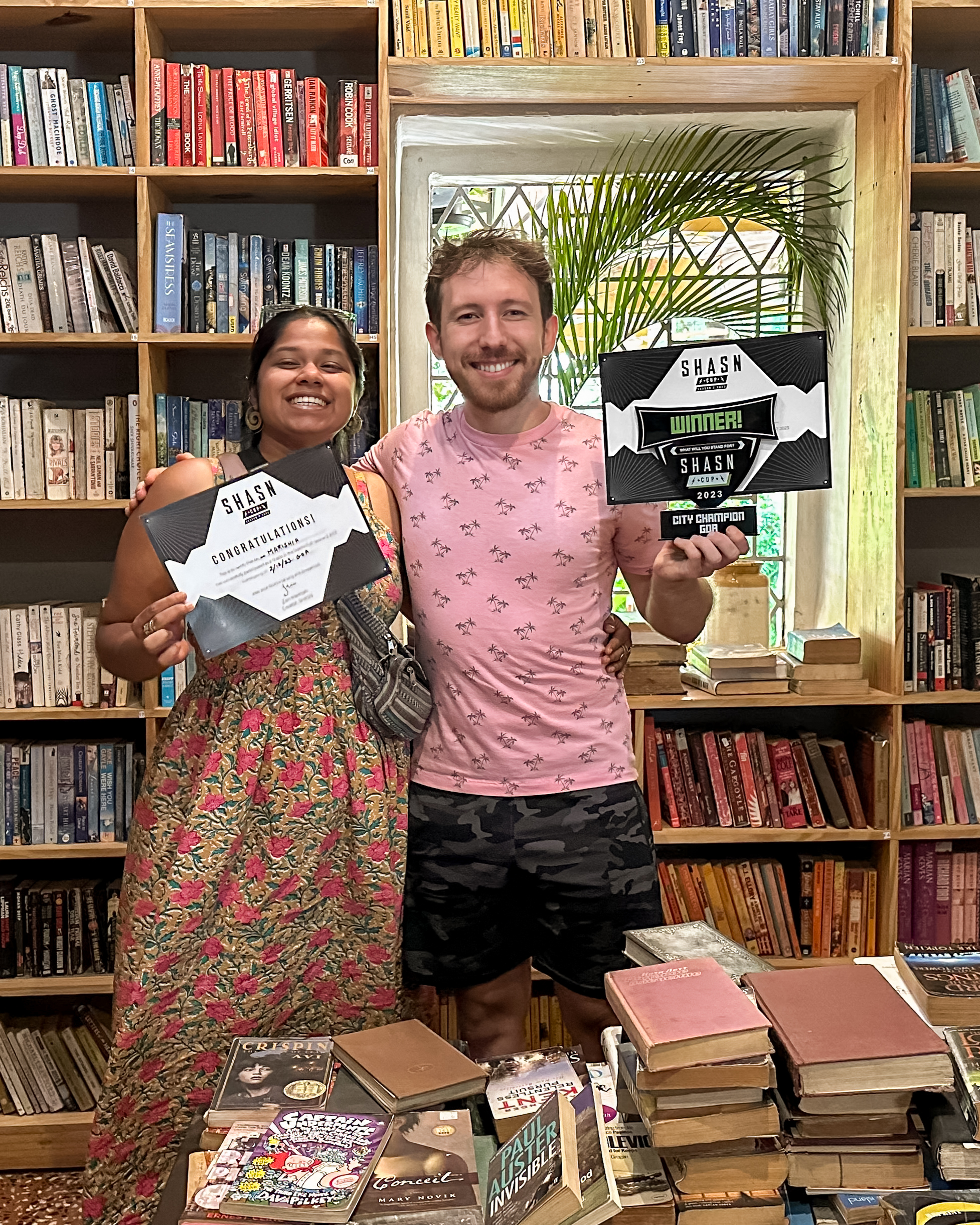
2023 Goa finalists with state trophy

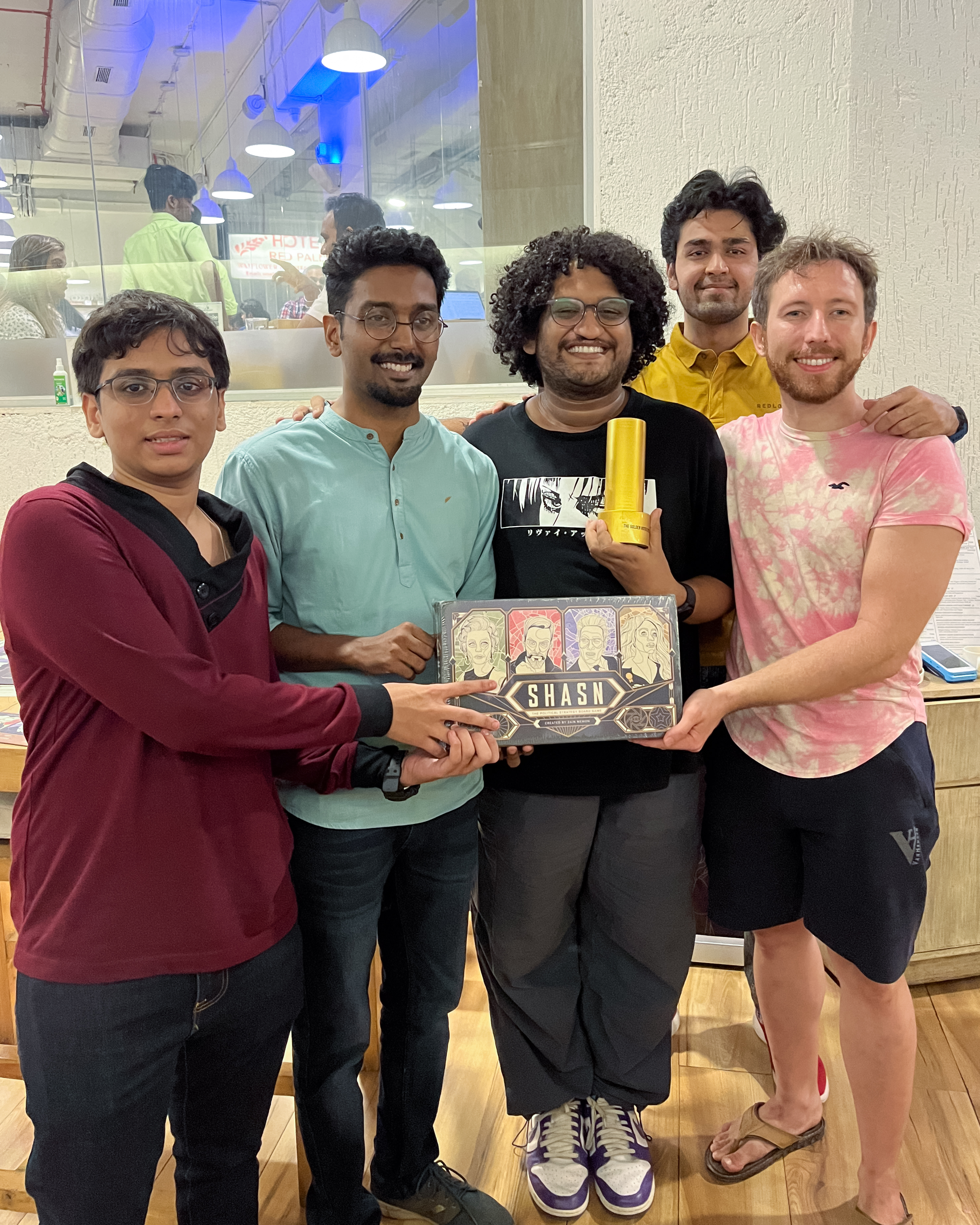
2023 India finalists

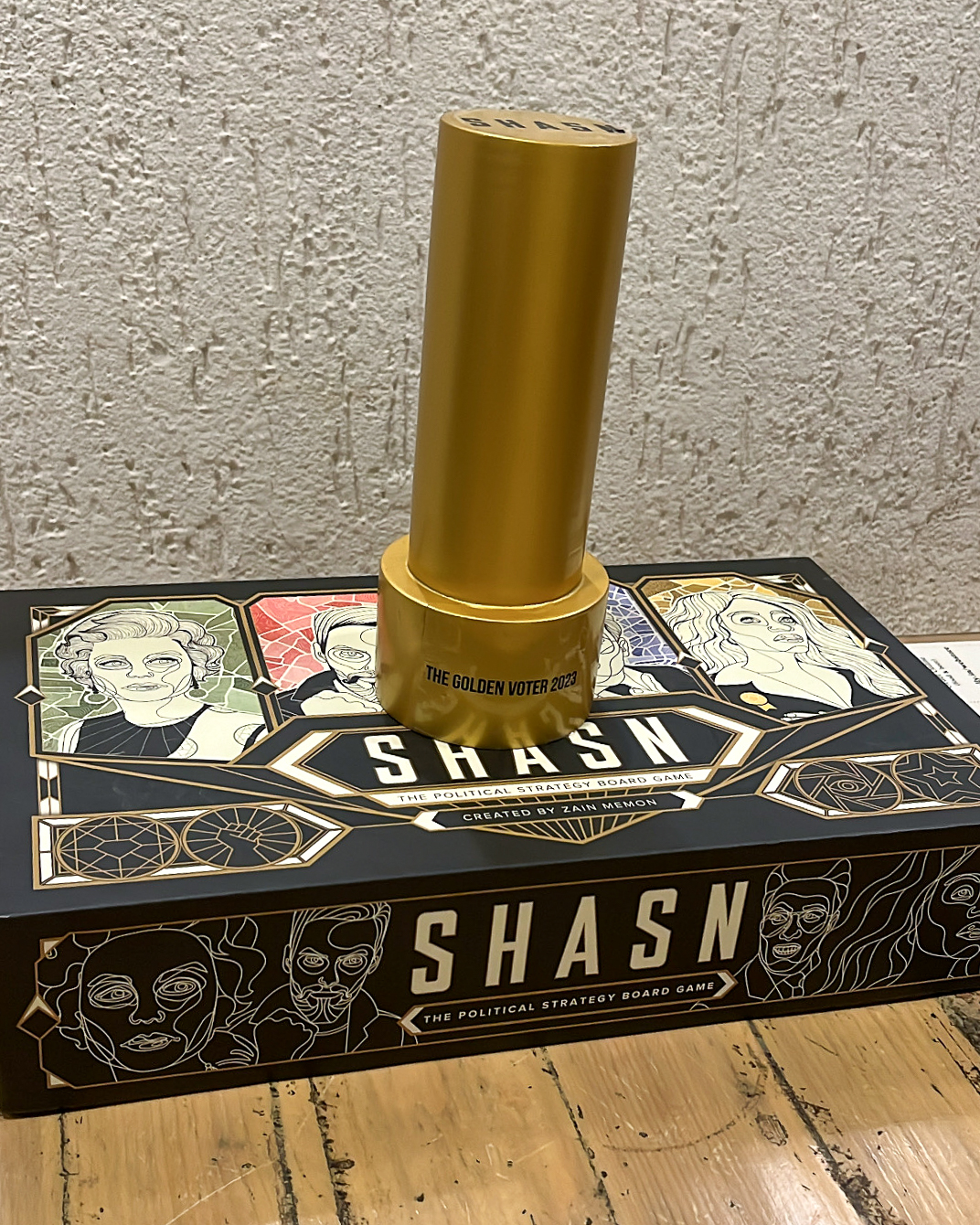
2023 National trophy

=== Season 3 (2024) ===
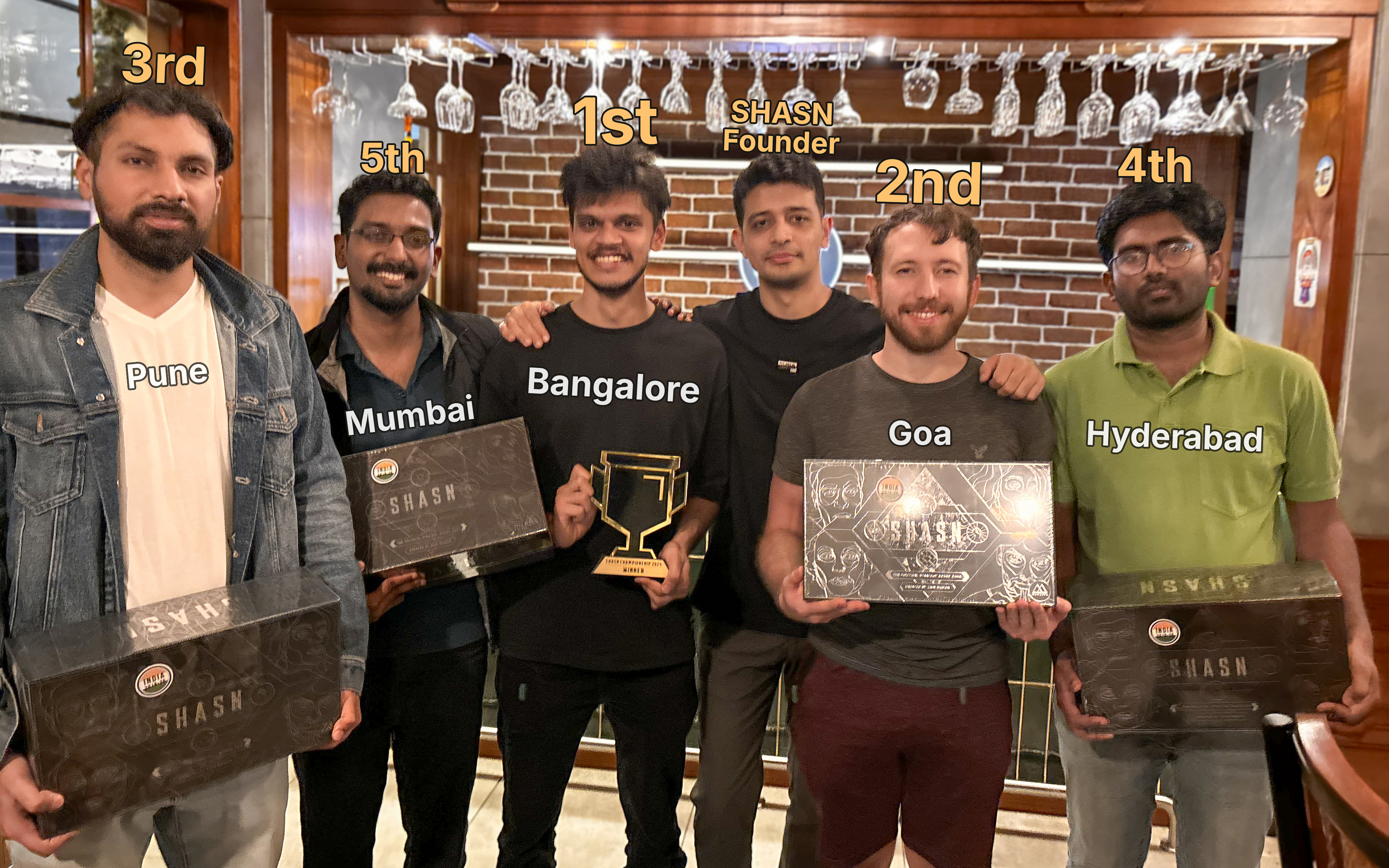
2024 India finalists

The third official Shasn tournament took place in India from November to December 2024. Eight finalists were chosen from the following 8 cities/states (1 finalist per city/state):

- Ahmedabad - Arsheya Joshi (did not attend the final game)
- Bengaluru - Harsha Prabhu
- Delhi - Arush Pasricha (did not attend the final game)
- Goa - Jay Jarosz
- Hyderabad - N Ravi Teja
- Mumbai - Sahil Parsekar
- Pune - Ankur Mishra
- Thiruvananthapuram - Mukund V. (did not attend the final game)

On Saturday, 21 December, the plan was to split the 8 finalists into two tables with 4 players each. Then the 4 finalists with the highest scores were to face off on Sunday, 22 December. However, 3 of the 8 finalists were not able to attend and so the remaining 5 finalists faced off in a single game on Saturday, 21 December at Toco Bar in Andheri, Mumbai using the India 2022-23 campaign deck. The results were as follows:

Rank	Name	City/State	Score	Voters	Ideology cards
1st	Harsha Prabhu	Bengaluru	26 points (3 zones)	31	3 capitalist, 0 supremo, 4 showstopper, 5 idealist
2nd	Jay Jarosz	Goa	22 points (3 zones)	30	0 capitalist, 3 supremo, 4 showstopper, 5 idealist
3rd	Ankur Mishra	Pune	15 points (2 zones)	23	4 capitalist, 0 supremo, 5 showstopper, 3 idealist
4th	N Ravi Teja	Hyderabad	6 points (1 zones)	16	3 capitalist, 6 supremo, 1 showstopper, 1 idealist
5th	Sahil Parsekar	Mumbai	0 points (0 zones)	24	2 capitalist, 5 supremo, 4 showstopper, 0 idealist

The prize for first place was a trophy and a 1,00,000 INR cheque. This was the third time in a row that the SHASN championship was won by the finalist from Bengaluru.
