= Émile Guimet Prize for Asian Literature =

The Émile Guimet Prize for Asian Literature (Le Prix Émile Guimet de littérature asiatique) is a French literary prize awarded for the first time in 2017, and annually thereafter.

== About the prize ==
The jury is made up of staff from the Musée Guimet, with writers, publishers and others in the book world. Between five and ten works from the previous year are selected on the basis of four criteria

- the winning work is a translation into French,
- the author is from one of the geographical areas of expertise of the museum,
- the translation was published in France during the previous calendar year,
- the original text was published in its country of origin less than ten years earlier.

== Winners and honorees ==
| Year | Author | Work (English & French titles) | Original language & title | Translator(s) |
|---|---|---|---|---|
2017 (1st); Judging panel: Jean-Claude Carrière (chair); Sophie Makariou; Valérie Vesque-Jeancard; Emmanuel Lozerand; Danielle Elisseeff; Elisabeth Lesne; Xavier Monthéard; Hélène Salat
| 2017 (1st); Judging panel: Jean-Claude Carrière (chair); Sophie Makariou; Valérie Vesque-Jeancard; Emmanuel Lozerand; Danielle Elisseeff; Elisabeth Lesne; Xavier Monthéard; Hélène Salat | Rana Dasgupta | Capital (Delhi Capitale) | English | Bernard Turle |
| 2017 (1st); Judging panel: Jean-Claude Carrière (chair); Sophie Makariou; Valérie Vesque-Jeancard; Emmanuel Lozerand; Danielle Elisseeff; Elisabeth Lesne; Xavier Monthéard; Hélène Salat | Park Hyoung-su | Nana at Dawn (Nana à l’aube) | Korean 새벽의 나나 | Fabien Bartkowiak; Jeong Hyun-joo |
| 2017 (1st); Judging panel: Jean-Claude Carrière (chair); Sophie Makariou; Valérie Vesque-Jeancard; Emmanuel Lozerand; Danielle Elisseeff; Elisabeth Lesne; Xavier Monthéard; Hélène Salat | Hideo Okuda | Lala Pipo | Japanese ララピポ | Patrick Honnoré; Maeda Yukari |
| 2017 (1st); Judging panel: Jean-Claude Carrière (chair); Sophie Makariou; Valérie Vesque-Jeancard; Emmanuel Lozerand; Danielle Elisseeff; Elisabeth Lesne; Xavier Monthéard; Hélène Salat | Gong Ji-young | Tall Blue Ladder (L’échelle de Jacob) | Korean 높고 푸른 사다리 | Lim Yeong-hee; Mélanie Basnel |
| 2017 (1st); Judging panel: Jean-Claude Carrière (chair); Sophie Makariou; Valérie Vesque-Jeancard; Emmanuel Lozerand; Danielle Elisseeff; Elisabeth Lesne; Xavier Monthéard; Hélène Salat | Ch'ŏn Myŏnggwan | Modern Family (Une famille à l’ancienne) | Korean 고령화 가족 | Patrick Maurus |
| 2017 (1st); Judging panel: Jean-Claude Carrière (chair); Sophie Makariou; Valérie Vesque-Jeancard; Emmanuel Lozerand; Danielle Elisseeff; Elisabeth Lesne; Xavier Monthéard; Hélène Salat | Han Kang | Human Acts (Celui qui revient) | Korean 소년이 온다 | Jeong Eun-jin; Jacques Batilliot |
| 2017 (1st); Judging panel: Jean-Claude Carrière (chair); Sophie Makariou; Valérie Vesque-Jeancard; Emmanuel Lozerand; Danielle Elisseeff; Elisabeth Lesne; Xavier Monthéard; Hélène Salat | Su Tong | Shadow of the Hunter (Le Dit du Loriot) | Chinese 黄雀记 | François Sastourné |
| 2017 (1st); Judging panel: Jean-Claude Carrière (chair); Sophie Makariou; Valérie Vesque-Jeancard; Emmanuel Lozerand; Danielle Elisseeff; Elisabeth Lesne; Xavier Monthéard; Hélène Salat | Tan Twan Eng | The Garden of Evening Mists (Le jardin des brumes du soir) | English | Philippe Giraudon |
2018 (2nd); Judging panel: Brigitte Lefèvre (chair); Sophie Makariou; Florence Évin; Alexandre Kazerouni; Dominique Schneidre; Florine Maréchal; Emmanuel Lincot
| 2018 (2nd); Judging panel: Brigitte Lefèvre (chair); Sophie Makariou; Florence Évin; Alexandre Kazerouni; Dominique Schneidre; Florine Maréchal; Emmanuel Lincot | Hwang Sok-yong | At Dusk (Au soleil couchant) | Korean 해질 무렵 | Chol Mikyung; Jean-Noël Juttet |
| 2018 (2nd); Judging panel: Brigitte Lefèvre (chair); Sophie Makariou; Florence Évin; Alexandre Kazerouni; Dominique Schneidre; Florine Maréchal; Emmanuel Lincot | A Yi | A Perfect Crime (Le Jeu du chat et de la souris) | Chinese 下面，我该干些什么 | Mélie Chen |
| 2018 (2nd); Judging panel: Brigitte Lefèvre (chair); Sophie Makariou; Florence Évin; Alexandre Kazerouni; Dominique Schneidre; Florine Maréchal; Emmanuel Lincot | Omar Shahid Hamid | The Prisoner (Le Prisonnier) | English | Laurent Barucq |
| 2018 (2nd); Judging panel: Brigitte Lefèvre (chair); Sophie Makariou; Florence Évin; Alexandre Kazerouni; Dominique Schneidre; Florine Maréchal; Emmanuel Lincot | Meena Kandasamy | The Gypsy Goddess (La Colère de Kurathi Amman) | English | Carine Chichereau |
| 2018 (2nd); Judging panel: Brigitte Lefèvre (chair); Sophie Makariou; Florence Évin; Alexandre Kazerouni; Dominique Schneidre; Florine Maréchal; Emmanuel Lincot | Wu Ming-yi | The Magician on the Skywalk (Le Magicien sur la passerelle) | Chinese 天橋上的魔術師 | Gwennaël Gaffric |
| 2018 (2nd); Judging panel: Brigitte Lefèvre (chair); Sophie Makariou; Florence Évin; Alexandre Kazerouni; Dominique Schneidre; Florine Maréchal; Emmanuel Lincot | Nashiki Kaho | The Lies of the Sea (Les Mensonges de la mer) | Japanese 海うそ | Corinne Quentin |
2019 (3rd); Judging panel: Adrien Goetz (chair); Sophie Makariou; Brigitte Nicolas; Pierre Singaravélou; Isabelle de Vendeuvre; Jeong Eun-jin; Nina Martinet
| 2019 (3rd); Judging panel: Adrien Goetz (chair); Sophie Makariou; Brigitte Nicolas; Pierre Singaravélou; Isabelle de Vendeuvre; Jeong Eun-jin; Nina Martinet | Natsu Miyashita | The Forest of Wool and Steel (Une forêt de laine et d’acier) | Japanese 羊と鋼の森 | Mathilde Tamae-Bouhon |
| 2019 (3rd); Judging panel: Adrien Goetz (chair); Sophie Makariou; Brigitte Nicolas; Pierre Singaravélou; Isabelle de Vendeuvre; Jeong Eun-jin; Nina Martinet | Eun Hee-kyung | Comfort the Boy (Encouragez donc les garçons) | Korean 소년을 위로해줘 | Hélène Lebrun; Yun Yennie |
| 2019 (3rd); Judging panel: Adrien Goetz (chair); Sophie Makariou; Brigitte Nicolas; Pierre Singaravélou; Isabelle de Vendeuvre; Jeong Eun-jin; Nina Martinet | Shih-Li Kow | The Sum of Our Follies (La somme de nos folies) | English | Frédéric Grellier |
| 2019 (3rd); Judging panel: Adrien Goetz (chair); Sophie Makariou; Brigitte Nicolas; Pierre Singaravélou; Isabelle de Vendeuvre; Jeong Eun-jin; Nina Martinet | Ashok Ferrey | The Ceaseless Chatter of Demons (L’incessant bavardage des demons) | English | Alice Seelow |
| 2019 (3rd); Judging panel: Adrien Goetz (chair); Sophie Makariou; Brigitte Nicolas; Pierre Singaravélou; Isabelle de Vendeuvre; Jeong Eun-jin; Nina Martinet | Jia Pingwa | The Lantern Bearer (Portée-la-Lumière) | Chinese 带灯 | Geneviève Imbot-Bichet |
2020 (4th); Judging panel: Aurélie Filippetti (chair); Pascal Bruckner; Mathilde Tamae-Bouhon; Sophie Makariou
| 2020 (4th); Judging panel: Aurélie Filippetti (chair); Pascal Bruckner; Mathilde Tamae-Bouhon; Sophie Makariou | Fang Fang | A Soft Burial (Funérailles molles) | Chinese 软埋 | Brigitte Duzan; Zhang Xiaoqiu |
| 2020 (4th); Judging panel: Aurélie Filippetti (chair); Pascal Bruckner; Mathilde Tamae-Bouhon; Sophie Makariou | Shion Miura | The Great Passage (La grande traverse) | Japanese 舟を編む | Sophie Refle |
| 2020 (4th); Judging panel: Aurélie Filippetti (chair); Pascal Bruckner; Mathilde Tamae-Bouhon; Sophie Makariou | Cho Nam-joo | Kim Ji-young, Born 1982 (Kim Jiyoung née en 1982) | Korean; 82년생 김지영 | Pierre Bisiou; Kyungran Choi |
| 2020 (4th); Judging panel: Aurélie Filippetti (chair); Pascal Bruckner; Mathilde Tamae-Bouhon; Sophie Makariou | Shiga Izumi | The Heartless God Descends (Quand le ciel pleut d’indifférence) | Japanese 無情の神が舞い降りる | Elisabeth Suetsugu |
| 2020 (4th); Judging panel: Aurélie Filippetti (chair); Pascal Bruckner; Mathilde Tamae-Bouhon; Sophie Makariou | Prajwal Parajuly | Land Where I Flee (Fuir et revenir) | English | Benoîte Dauvergne |
| 2020 (4th); Judging panel: Aurélie Filippetti (chair); Pascal Bruckner; Mathilde Tamae-Bouhon; Sophie Makariou | Tsering Döndrup | The Red Howling Wind (Tempête rouge) | Tibetan རླུང་དམར་འུར་འུར། | Françoise Robin |
| 2020 (4th); Judging panel: Aurélie Filippetti (chair); Pascal Bruckner; Mathilde Tamae-Bouhon; Sophie Makariou | Fatima Bhutto | The Runaways (Comme des lions) | English | Sophie Bastide-Foltz |
| 2020 (4th); Judging panel: Aurélie Filippetti (chair); Pascal Bruckner; Mathilde Tamae-Bouhon; Sophie Makariou | Manu Joseph | Miss Laila, Armed and Dangerous (Miss Laila armée jusqu’aux dents) | English | Bernard Turle |
| 2020 (4th); Judging panel: Aurélie Filippetti (chair); Pascal Bruckner; Mathilde Tamae-Bouhon; Sophie Makariou | Hye-young Pyun | The Hole (Le jardin) | Korean 홀 | Lim Yeong-Hee; Lucie Modde |
| 2020 (4th); Judging panel: Aurélie Filippetti (chair); Pascal Bruckner; Mathilde Tamae-Bouhon; Sophie Makariou | Liu Zhenyun | Children of the Melon Eating Age (Un parfum de corruption) | Chinese 吃瓜时代的儿女们 | Geneviève Imbot-Bichet |
2021 (5th); Judging panel: Régine Hatchondo (chair); Pascal Bruckner; Olivier Rolin; Guillaume Husson; Jean-Claude Pastor; Sophie Makariou
| 2021 (5th); Judging panel: Régine Hatchondo (chair); Pascal Bruckner; Olivier Rolin; Guillaume Husson; Jean-Claude Pastor; Sophie Makariou | Ng Kim Chew | Rain (Pluie) | Chinese 雨 | Pierre-Mong Lim |
| 2021 (5th); Judging panel: Régine Hatchondo (chair); Pascal Bruckner; Olivier Rolin; Guillaume Husson; Jean-Claude Pastor; Sophie Makariou | Mitsuyo Kakuta | Pale Moon (Lune de papier) | Japanese 紙の月 | Sophie Refle |
| 2021 (5th); Judging panel: Régine Hatchondo (chair); Pascal Bruckner; Olivier Rolin; Guillaume Husson; Jean-Claude Pastor; Sophie Makariou | Hideo Yakuda | Three Days in The Life of a Yakuza (Trois jours dans la vie d’un yakuza) | Japanese 純平、考え直せ | Mathilde Tamae-Bouhon |
| 2021 (5th); Judging panel: Régine Hatchondo (chair); Pascal Bruckner; Olivier Rolin; Guillaume Husson; Jean-Claude Pastor; Sophie Makariou | Geetanjali Shree | Tomb of Sand (Ret Samadhi, au-delà de la frontière) | Hindi रेत समाधि | Annie Montaut |
| 2021 (5th); Judging panel: Régine Hatchondo (chair); Pascal Bruckner; Olivier Rolin; Guillaume Husson; Jean-Claude Pastor; Sophie Makariou | Deepa Anappara | Djinn Patrol on the Purple Line (Les Disparus de la Purple Line) | English | Élisabeth Peellaert |
| 2021 (5th); Judging panel: Régine Hatchondo (chair); Pascal Bruckner; Olivier Rolin; Guillaume Husson; Jean-Claude Pastor; Sophie Makariou | Chi Ta-wei | Pearls (Perles) | Chinese 珍珠 | Gwennaël Gaffric |
| 2021 (5th); Judging panel: Régine Hatchondo (chair); Pascal Bruckner; Olivier Rolin; Guillaume Husson; Jean-Claude Pastor; Sophie Makariou | Ren Xiaowen | On the Balcony (Sur le balcon) | Chinese 阳台上 | Brigitte Duzan |
| 2021 (5th); Judging panel: Régine Hatchondo (chair); Pascal Bruckner; Olivier Rolin; Guillaume Husson; Jean-Claude Pastor; Sophie Makariou | Areno Inoue | Stir Fried Cabbage on the Sidewalk (L'Ode aux choux sautés) | Japanese キャベツ炒めに捧ぐ | Patrick Honnoré |
| 2021 (5th); Judging panel: Régine Hatchondo (chair); Pascal Bruckner; Olivier Rolin; Guillaume Husson; Jean-Claude Pastor; Sophie Makariou | Jung Jae-Han | Investigative Notebooks of a Necromantic Handsome (Le carnet d'enquête d'un beau gosse nécromant) | Korean 미남당 사건수첩 | Han Yumi; Hervé Péjaudier |
| 2021 (5th); Judging panel: Régine Hatchondo (chair); Pascal Bruckner; Olivier Rolin; Guillaume Husson; Jean-Claude Pastor; Sophie Makariou | Hiroko Oyamada | The Factory (L'Usine) | Japanese 工場 | Silvain Chupin |
| 2022 (6th) Judging Panel: Zabou Breitman (chair) Yannick Lintz Line Papin Guillaume Husson Olivier Roellinger Maria Lund | | | | |
| 2022 (6th) Judging Panel: Zabou Breitman (chair) Yannick Lintz Line Papin Guillaume Husson Olivier Roellinger Maria Lund | Shubhangi Swarup | Dérive des âmes et des continentsLatitudes of Longing | English | Céline Schwaller |
| 2022 (6th) Judging Panel: Zabou Breitman (chair) Yannick Lintz Line Papin Guillaume Husson Olivier Roellinger Maria Lund | Zhang Yueran | L'hôtel du Cygne The Hotel Du Cygne | Chinese | Pierre-Mong Lim |
| 2022 (6th) Judging Panel: Zabou Breitman (chair) Yannick Lintz Line Papin Guillaume Husson Olivier Roellinger Maria Lund | Anthonythasan Jesuthasan | La sterne rougeThe Red Tern | Tamil ஸலாம் அலைக் | Léticia Ibanez |
| 2022 (6th) Judging Panel: Zabou Breitman (chair) Yannick Lintz Line Papin Guillaume Husson Olivier Roellinger Maria Lund | Shookofeh Azar | Quand s’illumine le prunier sauvageThe Enlightenment of the Greengage Tree | Persian | Muriel Sapati |
