= Humphrey Critchley-Salmonson =

English cricketer

Personal information
- Full name: Humphrey Seymour Ramsay Critchley-Salmonson
- Born: 19 January 1894; Chalbury Lodge, Preston, Dorset, England
- Died: 24 April 1956 (aged 62); Ottery St Mary, Devon, England
- Batting: Right-handed
- Bowling: Right-arm fast-medium

Domestic team information
- Years: Team
- 1910–1928: Somerset

Career statistics
Competition	FC
Matches	16
Runs scored	205
Batting average	8.91
100s/50s	0/1
Top score	66
Balls bowled	1446
Wickets	25
Bowling average	30.92
5 wickets in innings	1
10 wickets in match	0
Best bowling	5/23
Catches/stumpings	16/–
- Source: CricketArchive, 22 December 2015

Humphrey Seymour Ramsay Critchley-Salmonson (19 January 1894 at Preston in Dorset – 24 April 1956 at Ottery St Mary, Devon), played first-class cricket intermittently over an 18-year period for Somerset. He later played two first-class matches for Sir Julien Cahn's XI in Argentina.

Critchley-Salmonson was a right-handed lower order batsman and a right-arm fast-medium bowler. He appeared first for Somerset as a 16-year-old in 1910, having impressed as a fast bowler at Winchester College. "He came in of a lengthy run and delivered the ball with a windmill action that brought added fear to callow and timorous fifth-form batsmen," says one account of his arrival at Somerset. He played two matches in 1910, and two more in 1912, and then disappeared from first-class cricket for a dozen years, during which time he lived and played cricket in Argentina, representing the country with some success in international non-first-class matches: he took five Brazilian wickets for 43 runs in one international innings.

He returned to Somerset in 1924, playing nine County Championship matches, eight of them at home, in the second half of the season. "Both the pace and the enthusiasm had waned," wrote Somerset's historian. But he took 18 wickets including five for 23 in an innings when Sussex were bowled out for 58 on a damp pitch at Weston-super-Mare. And when Somerset hit the county's then-highest innings total, 675 for nine declared, against Hampshire at Bath, Critchley-Salmonson contributed 66, batting at No 9 and increasing his own personal highest score sixfold. After 1924, he disappeared from county cricket apart from one single appearance for Somerset against Surrey at The Oval in 1928, when he scored 32 and 0 and took one wicket.

Thereafter, Critchley-Salmonson appeared in first-class cricket only in two matches on a tour of Argentina by Sir Julien Cahn's XI in 1929-30: he also played in minor matches on this tour, and for Cahn's XI in minor matches in Ireland and England over the next couple of years.
