= Kieran Crichlow =

English-born Barbadian footballer

Personal information
- Date of birth: 31 July 1981 (age 45)
- Height: 1.75 m (5 ft 9 in)
- Position: Striker

Senior career*
| Years | Team | Apps | (Gls) |
| 2001–2002 | Hounslow Borough | | |
| 2002 | Molesey | | |
| 2002–2003 | Witney United | | |
| 2003–2004 | Hampton & Richmond Borough | | |
| 2007–2008 | Molesey | | |

International career
| 2008 | Barbados | 1 | (0) |
- * Club domestic league appearances and goals

Kieran Crichlow (born 31 July 1981) is a retired footballer who played as a striker. Born in England, he represented Barbados at international level.

== Club career ==
He played for a number of English non-league clubs, including Hounslow Borough, Molesey, Witney United and Hampton & Richmond Borough.

== International career ==
Crichlow made his debut for Barbados in a May 2008 friendly match against Trinidad & Tobago.
