= Being You: A New Science of Consciousness =

2021 book by Anil Seth

- Author: Anil Seth
- Language: English
- Genre: Philosophy, psychology, neuroscience
- Publisher: Faber and Faber
- Publication date: September 2, 2021
- ISBN: 978-0-57133-770-5

Being You: A New Science of Consciousness is a 2021 non-fiction book by neuroscientist Anil Seth, published by Faber and Faber. The book explores the author's theory of consciousness and the self. Seth also looks at the relationship between humans, animals, and the potential for machines to have consciousness.

The writing process took Seth three years, with support from the Wellcome Trust. The ideas in the book come from Seth's long-standing interest in understanding the mind, combined with research and discussions with his team in Sussex.

The book was well-received by major publications and was awarded Best Book of 2021 from Bloomberg and The Economist and Best Science Book of 2021 by The Guardian and the Financial Times. Critics praised the book for being rigorous and meticulous in its research, and Seth's writing style. However, some reviewers pointed out concerns with the language and approach towards solving consciousness used in the book.

== Context ==
Anil Seth is a neuroscientist based in Sussex, England. Having been interested in consciousness since childhood, and after finding Tononi's 1998 paper compelling, (Note: Seth 2021, pg. 51) he developed his theory of "causal density" with a different mathematical foundation.

In an interview with The Guardian, Seth stated he wanted to understand himself and others. His multidisciplinary team in Sussex helped in writing the book, all wanting to develop a "satisfying scientific explanation of conscious experience." He described Being You as a means to weave multiple threads of ideas together.

The book took three years to write. Seth said the process was difficult due to other commitments, but the Wellcome Trust provided him with an Engagement Fellowship which helped him find time to write.

== Summary ==
The book is split into six parts and various chapters, each giving a broad overview of various philosophical and scientific positions that Seth relates to his own conclusions. Personal stories are also used to illustrate his points. Seth's theory of consciousness consists of three parts: conscious level, conscious content, and conscious self.

Conscious level is Seth's measurement of how conscious a being is. He defines it as a multilayered increase or decrease of brain activity, ranging between brain death, being comatose, being awake, and non-ordinary mental states caused by psychedelics. Conscious content is what a being is conscious of, be it their senses, emotions, thoughts, or beliefs. Conscious self is the pure awareness of the self, consisting of multiple facets Seth defines by their core focus: bodily self, perspectival self, volitional self, narrative self, and social self. (Note: Seth defines these like so: Bodily self: the experience of being and having a body.; Perspectival self: the experience of first-person perspective of the world.; Volitional self: the experiences of intention and of agency.; Narrative self: the experience of being a continuous and distinctive person.; Social self: the experience of having a self refracted through the minds of others.) These facets usually exist simultaneously, and all can exist at the same time. Seth argues the brain uses Bayesian inference and predictive modelling (Note: Through the use of generative models, perceptual hierarchies (from large scale to low scale characteristics of something), and precision weighting of sensory signals (influence adjustment of each sense)) to produce a "controlled hallucination" which is a subjective rendering of the inside and outside world. The brain makes predictions, sensory signals keep the predictions tied to their causes, and subjective experiences are created via "top-down" predictions rather than "bottom-up." (Note: Referring to how brain signals go from the inner brain (top) to the outside world via our senses (bottom) rather than the conventional view of the opposite occurring.)

He proposes a new problem of consciousness that differs from David Chalmer's hard problem of consciousness. Instead of asking why or how beings experience qualia, Seth states we should focus on asking why a particular brain pattern of activity maps to a particular kind of conscious experience. His solution, as a physicalist and as a scientist, is through understanding the underlying biological processes of the brain through explaining, predicting, and controlling them.

Anil Seth's Theory of Consciousness
Conscious ...	Definition	Consists of	Brain uses	Brain outputs
... Level	How conscious a being is.	From least to most conscious: brain death, comatose, awake, non-ordinary mental states (under the influence of psychedelics).	Bayesian inference, predictive modelling (using generative models, perceptual hierarchies, precision weighting of sensory signals).	Controlled hallucinations.
... Content	What a person is conscious of.	Senses, emotions, thoughts, beliefs.	Bayesian inference, predictive modelling (using generative models, perceptual hierarchies, precision weighting of sensory signals).	Controlled hallucinations.
... Self	The conscious awareness of the self.	Bodily self, perspectival self, volitional self, narrative self, social self.	Bayesian inference, predictive modelling (using generative models, perceptual hierarchies, precision weighting of sensory signals).	Controlled hallucinations.
Problem of consciousness
Description			Solution	
Why a particular brain pattern of activity maps to a particular kind of conscious experience.			Understanding the underlying biological processes of the brain through explaining, predicting, and controlling them. The question of how and why these processes exist in the universe is not necessary.	

== Reception ==
=== General ===
Gaia Vince in her review for The Observer describes the book as a "meticulously researched" scientific exploration of people's souls. She identifies key themes throughout the book, such as consciousness, in Seth's view, being any and all subjective experiences as a key component to human identity. Disagreements between "perceptual expectations" and "conscious experience", she states, is how we bypass William Blake's so-called "doors of perceptions". These "doors", she writes, are seen in the dress phenomena and through the usage of hallucinogenics and virtual reality, which Seth discusses in the book. These altered states of mind influencing personal characteristics was shown to Vince through her grandfather's transition from a "funny, gentle man" into a stranger who "spoke inappropriately and unkindly" due to dementia. Despite this, she finds the book exhilarating and thinks it would "become a seminal text."

Writing in The Business Standard, the journalist Sams Wahid Shahat describes Seth's real problem of consciousness as a way to "dissolve" the hard problem. He details this being done through the various thought experiments which Seth presents throughout the book, which demystifies the hard problem by looking at the underlying biological processes in the mind. Shahat states that Seth borrowed the prediction machine concept from Hermann von Helmholtz, and controlled hallucinations are a part of these predictive processes. He describes the five facets of the conscious self as "theoretically distinct and can be understood independently" but we are able to perceive either multiple or all of these processes at the same time. Shahat praises the book as an "intriguing and accessible journey into the realm of consciousness" and "compelling" if one ignores "the book's emphasis on idea judgments [over] idea generation."

The science journalist Maddie Bender, writing for Scientific American, describes the book as "logically rigorous" to the point of almost being tedious, and observes Seth's likeliness to both discuss Kant as well as recent studies in detailing his theory of consciousness. She praises his vivid descriptions of scientific experiments, preferring them to the "philosophical hypotheticals of false selves and teleportation" also present in the book.

=== Scientific ===
The neuroscientist Felix Haas in his review published in World Literature Today believes Seth's position on the hard problem of consciousness to fall in the middle between the two positions of either finding the hard problem to be meaningful or meaningless; rather, Haas states Seth's view is "not think[ing] that the hard problem is inherently meaningless" while also finding direct confrontation to it to be unproductive. In his view, Seth instead wants to focus on the "real" problem of consciousness which is “why a particular pattern of brain activity ... maps to a particular kind of conscious experience", which Haas claimed is a "pivotal role" in Seth's thought process. Haas found Seth's description of error minimisation, which results in the brain receiving controlled hallucinations, to have magnitude, though whether it is for the field of neuroscience or to world in general is left unclear in his review. The book has the same issues of many other introductory texts, Haas claims, such as it contains detail that would be "exciting to the researcher" but "frustrating to the novice" and the author defending their own school of philosophy, but Haas praises the book as being "more careful yet bolder than others." He concludes his review in describing it as a "fantastic exposition" of ideas gaining support in both neuroscience and artificial intelligence, and that while it is too early to write a definite book on the subject, "[Being You] has gotten closer to it than any other."

Paul Thagard, writing for Psychology Today, reiterates Seth's alternative real problem for consciousness in his review and states any theory of consciousness must specify mechanisms that apply to external and internal sensations, emotions, and thoughts, while also engaging with each experience's neural theory. Thagard is critical of the Bayesian inference theory of consciousness which Seth employs in his book, stating "the brain is ... more than a prediction machine, ... evidence is lacking [for the theory], ... and how Bayesian predictions produce a full range of conscious experiences remains unspecified." He is also critical of calling perceptions "controlled hallucinations", but compliments Seth's presentation of the problem and the inclusion of "many interesting discussions" in-regards to neuroscience.

=== Philosophical ===
Writing a review for Naturalism.org, the naturalist philosopher Tom Clark praises the book for its writing and "entertaining insight" into questions such as why the brain creates controlled hallucinations, who or what is the self, and where else beyond human brains "does consciousness arise", especially in the context of predictive processing. He agrees with Seth in-regard to qualia, that their phenomenology is real and not an illusion. The proposition that Seth provides, that the experience of consciousness does not exist in the real world, is one Clark finds extraordinary, and questions if the position of physicalism can state whether qualia is "identical to, or an emergent property" of neural ensembles and other physical vehicles. Controlled hallucinations are, at least to Clark's understanding of the book, to control the behaviour of an individual, and concerns about experiences' role as causal controllers do not worry him "since its associated neural processes ... are already reliably in control." He describes Seth as a "skeptic about contra-causal, libertarian free will", and affirms consciousness as natural phenomena, but claims Daniel Dennett might disagree with Seth on the unconditional nature of causal determinism and human agency. Despite disagreements with Seth's methodology or conclusions, Clark ends his review with describing the book as a lively, "important and original contribution to understanding how conscious minds arise in the natural world."

Julian Baggini, writing in The Wall Street Journal, states that if one could only read one book on consciousness, it should be Seth's. Believing most theories of consciousness are "doomed to fail" due to having the wrong focus, Baggini describes Seth's approach as neither addressing the hard or soft problem of consciousness, instead asking for the real problem of consciousness (discussed above). He argues Seth's prediction machine theory is not intended to be a definitive answer, and the problems of consciousness will "dissolve away" as science progresses. While stating Seth is "meticulously precise" in his prose, Baggini questions if the terminology used in the book ("hallucination" and "fantasy") would invite misunderstandings, but concludes those concerns were minor. Seth's chapter on free will, he says, should be read prior to any books on the subject, and he agrees with Seth when he wrote that "science has given back ... more" every time it refutes anthropocentrism.

== Awards ==
The book received various annual best book awards. It was chosen as one of the 49 Best Books of 2021 by Bloomberg, one of the best books by The Economist, one of the 8 Best Science Books of 2021 by The Guardian and one of the best science books by the Financial Times, and one of the 5 Best Philosophy Books of 2021 according to Nigel Warburton.
