= Anil Seth =

British neuroscientist

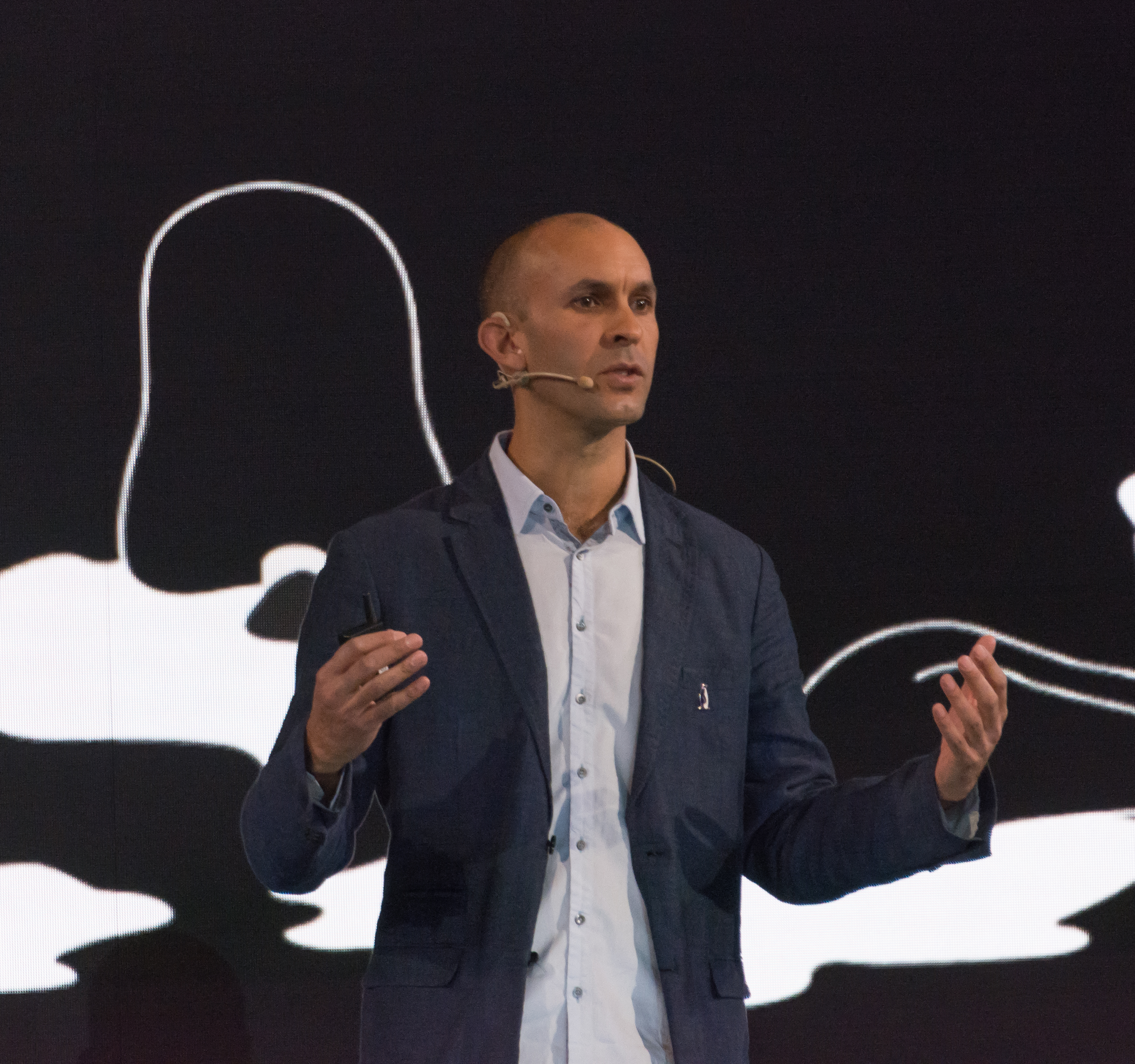
- Seth in 2019
- Born: Anil Kumar Seth; 11 June 1972 (age 54); Oxford, England
- Education: King's College, Cambridge (BA); University of Sussex (MSc, PhD)
- Scientific career
- Fields: Neuroscience
- Workplaces: University of Sussex
- Thesis: On the Relations between Behaviour, Mechanism, and Environment: Explorations in Artificial Evolution (2000)
- Doctoral advisors: Hilary Buxton; Phil Husbands
- Website: www.anilseth.com

Anil Kumar Seth (born 11 June 1972) is a British neuroscientist and professor of Cognitive and Computational Neuroscience at the University of Sussex. A proponent of materialist explanations of consciousness, he is currently amongst the most cited scholars on the topics of neuroscience and cognitive science globally.

Seth holds a BA (promoted to an MA per tradition) in natural science from King's College, Cambridge, and a PhD in computer science from the University of Sussex. Seth has published over 100 scientific papers and book chapters, and is the editor-in-chief of the journal Neuroscience of Consciousness. He is a regular contributor to New Scientist, The Guardian and the BBC, and writes the blog NeuroBanter.

== Early life and education ==
Seth was born in Oxford and grew up in Letcombe Regis, a village in rural South Oxfordshire. His father, Bhola Seth, obtained a BSc from Allahabad University in 1945, before migrating from India to the United Kingdom to study engineering at Cardiff. Bhola Seth subsequently obtained a PhD in Mechanical Engineering at Sheffield, was a research scientist at the Esso Research Centre in Abingdon, and won the veterans' world doubles title in badminton in 1976. His mother, Ann Delaney, came from Yorkshire.

Seth went to school at King Alfred's Academy in Wantage. He has degrees in Natural Sciences (BA/MA, King's College, Cambridge, 1994), Knowledge-Based Systems (M.Sc., Sussex, 1996) and Computer Science and Artificial Intelligence (D.Phil./Ph.D., Sussex, 2001). He was a postdoctoral and associate fellow at The Neurosciences Institute in San Diego, California (2001–2006).

== Career ==
Since 2010 Seth has been co-director (with Hugo Critchley) of the Sussex Centre for Consciousness Science, and editor-in-chief of Neuroscience of Consciousness. He was conference chair of the 16th meeting of the Association for the Scientific Study of Consciousness and continuing member 'at large' and is on the steering group and advisory board of the Human Mind Project. He was president of the Psychology Section of the British Science Association in 2017.

=== Publications ===
Seth has published over 100 scientific papers and book chapters, and is the editor-in-chief of the journal, Neuroscience of Consciousness. He is a regular contributor to New Scientist, The Guardian and the BBC, and writes the blog NeuroBanter. He also consulted for the popular science book, Eye Benders, which won the 2014 Royal Society Young People's Book Prize. He published an introductory essay on consciousness on Aeon, "The Real Problem" – a 2016 Editor's Pick. Seth was included in the 2019 Highly Cited Researchers List that was published by Clarivate Analytics. Seth contributes articles on consciousness and perception to the website EXPeditions. Seth's essay "The Mythology Of Conscious AI" won 2025 Berggruen Prize Essay Competition in the English language category and has been published on Noema.

=== Books ===
- Being You: A New Science of Consciousness (Faber & Faber, 2021) – author
- Brain Twisters (Ivy Press, 2015) – consultant
- 30-Second Brain (Ivy Press, 2014) – editor and co-author
- Eye Benders (Ivy Press, 2013) – consultant
- Modelling Natural Action Selection (Cambridge University Press, 2011) – editor and co-author

=== Popularisation of science ===
Seth appeared in the 2018 Netflix documentary The Most Unknown on scientific research directed by Ian Cheney. In 2026, he was featured in Conscious, a film directed by Suki Chan that explores consciousness, memory and the self.

== See also ==
- User illusion, an understanding of consciousness similar to Seth's
