= Madeline McIntosh =

American publishing executive

- Education: Harvard University
- Occupation: Publishing executive
- Known for: Former CEO of Penguin Random House U.S.; co-founder of Authors Equity

Madeline McIntosh is an American book publishing executive. She served as the chief executive officer of Penguin Random House U.S. from 2018 to 2023, and in 2024 co-founded the independent publisher Authors Equity. She also serves on the board of directors of Simon & Schuster and as president of the board of Poets & Writers.

== Early career ==
McIntosh studied fine arts at Harvard University and later completed the Radcliffe Publishing Course. She began her career as a temporary assistant to an editor at HarperCollins before moving to W. W. Norton. In 1994, she joined Bantam Doubleday Dell, a division of Bertelsmann, working in its new-media department and setting up the publisher's first account with Amazon.

She later led adult sales for Random House and ran Random House Audio. In 2008 she left to join Amazon in Luxembourg as director of content for the international rollout of the Kindle e-reader, returning to Random House about a year and a half later as president of sales, operations, and digital.

== Penguin Random House ==
Following the 2013 merger of Penguin and Random House, McIntosh was named chief executive of the combined company's U.S. business in 2018. Under her leadership, Penguin Random House expanded its data-driven marketing, invested in warehouse infrastructure, and acquired a 45 percent stake in the independent publisher Sourcebooks.

McIntosh announced her resignation in January 2023, weeks after global CEO Markus Dohle also departed.

== Authors Equity ==
In 2024, McIntosh launched Authors Equity with co-founders Don Weisberg, former CEO of Macmillan Publishers, and Nina von Moltke, former president of strategic development at Penguin Random House. The company offers no advances but pays authors a majority share of each book's profits, with a lean staff supplemented by freelance editors, publicists, and marketers. The Hollywood Reporter compared the arrangement as similar to some in the indie film industry. Early investors include authors James Clear, Tim Ferriss, and Louise Penny. Distribution is handled by Simon & Schuster.

== Other roles ==
In December 2023, McIntosh was named an independent director on the newly formed board of Simon & Schuster, following the publisher's acquisition by private equity firm KKR. She is also president of the board of directors of the literary nonprofit Poets & Writers.

== Recognition ==
McIntosh was named to the Forbes "50 Over 50: Vision" list in 2021.
