= Crazxy (soundtrack) =

2025 soundtrack album

Soundtrack album by Vishal Bhardwaj, Laxmikant–Pyarelal, The Red Kettle, Manan Bhardwaj, Khullar G, Yeah Proof, Harshavardhan Rameshwar and Osho Jain
- Released: 14 February 2025
- Genre: Feature film soundtrack
- Length: 38:08
- Language: Hindi
- Label: T-Series; Sony Music India; Ishtar Music

Crazxy is the soundtrack album to the 2025 film of the same name directed by Girish Kohli and produced by Sohum Shah, Mukesh Shah, Amita Shah and Adesh Prasad under Sohum Shah Films, starring Sohum in the lead role and only on-screen character. The accompanying soundtrack featured songs composed by Vishal Bhardwaj, Laxmikant–Pyarelal, The Red Kettle, Manan Bhardwaj, Khullar G, Yeah Proof, Harshavardhan Rameshwar and Osho Jain, with lyrics written by Gulzar, Ashim Kemson, Manan, Osho and Anand Bakshi. The soundtrack was released under the T-Series label on 14 February 2025.

== Background ==
Vishal Bhardwaj was initially brought forward to compose three original songs for Crazxy under the lyrics of Gulzar. The song "Goli Maar Bheje Main" composed by Bhardwaj for Satya (1998) was recreated for the film, by The Red Kettle and featured vocals by Ila Arun, Paroma Dasgupta, Siddharth Basrur, and additional lyrics by Vayu Shrivastav. The band also recreated the song "Abhimanyu" from Inquilaab (1984). The album also featured contributions from Manan Bhardwaj, Khullar G, Yeah Proof, Harshavardhan Rameshwar and Osho Jain.

== Release ==
The soundtrack was released under the T-Series label on 14 February 2025. The music video for "Abhimanyu" was released through Sony Music India on 20 February, while the video for "Goli Maar Bheje Main" was released through Ishtar Music on 26 February.

== Track listing ==
No.	Title	Lyrics	Music	Singer(s)	Length
1.	"Mitron Maidaan"	Ashim Kemson	Harshavardhan Rameshwar	Babbu Maan	3:24
2.	"Paapi"	Manan Bhardwaj	Manan Bhardwaj, Khullar G	Romy, Khullar G	3:39
3.	"Pul"	Gulzar	Vishal Bhardwaj	Vishal Mishra	4:23
4.	"Paapi 2.0"	Manan Bhardwaj	Manan Bhardwaj, Khullar G, Yeah Proof	Romy, Khullar G	2:42
5.	"O Papa"	Gulzar	Vishal Bhardwaj	Devika Sharma	4:15
6.	"Chann Ve"	Gulzar	Vishal Bhardwaj	Sukhwinder Singh	3:40
7.	"O Papa (Orchestral)"	Gulzar	Vishal Bhardwaj	Devika Sharma, Vishal Bhardwaj	4:38
8.	"Yun Hi Chale Gaye"	Osho Jain	Osho Jain	K. S. Chithra	4:41
9.	"Goli Maar Bheje Mein"	Gulzar, Vayu Shrivastav	Vishal Bhardwaj, The Red Kettle, Vineeth Jayan	Mano, Ila Arun, Paroma Dasgupta, Siddharth Basrur,	3:38
10.	"Abhimanyu"	Anand Bakshi	The Red Kettle, Laxmikant–Pyarelal, Kaizad Gherda	Kishore Kumar	3:46
Total length:					38:08

== Reception ==
Dhaval Roy of The Times of India described the film's music as evocative, adding "The redux of Laxmikant-Pyarelal’s Abhimanyu from Inquilab retains Kishore Kumar’s original vocals, delivering an emotionally charged reimagining, while Goli Maar Bheje Mein (Satya) and Mitron Maidaan (Babbu Maan) exude raw edginess. Pul (Vishal Mishra) offers a soft, melodic contrast, and O Papa tugs at the heartstrings, leaving you reaching for tissues." Rishabh Suri of Hindustan Times wrote "The music is mostly a rehash of classics, but the only one which suits the narrative is Abhimanyu from the film Inquilaab, in the voice of Kishore Kumar." Sana Farzeen of India Today wrote "The makers earn additional brownie points for their choice of music, seamlessly blending old classics like Kallu Mama with Kishore Kumar’s Abhimanyu Chakravyuh Mein Fas Gaya Hai to enhance the drama and mood of the film."

Ganesh Aaglave of Firstpost wrote "The amazing combo of legendary lyricist Gulzar and composer Vishal Bhardwaj contributed beautifully with their compositions, which blended beautifully with the theme of the movie." Rishil Jogani of Pinkvilla summarized "The background music is a heartbeat of its own, amplifying the suspense. Songs like Abhimanyu, Goli Maar Bheje Mein, and Oh Papa are very different, yet they suit the mood of the film, brilliantly." Critic based at Bollywood Hungama wrote "Vishal Bhardwaj's music is okay. 'Paapi' stands out while the recreations of 'Abhimanyu Chakravyuh Mein' and 'Goli Maar Bheje Mein' are impressive. Jesper Kyd's background score is top-class and elevates impact."
