= Gustaakh Ishq (soundtrack) =

Soundtrack album by Vishal Bhardwaj
- Released: 19 November 2025
- Recorded: 2024–2025
- Genre: Feature film soundtrack
- Length: 24:41
- Language: Hindi
- Label: Zee Music Company
- Producer: Meghdeep Bose Debarpito Saha

Vishal Bhardwaj chronology
Crazxy (2025)	Gustaakh Ishq (2025)	O'Romeo (2026)
External audio
- Official Audio Jukebox on YouTube

Gustaakh Ishq is the soundtrack album composed by Vishal Bhardwaj to the 2025 film of the same name directed by Vibhu Virender Puri and starring Naseeruddin Shah, Vijay Varma and Fatima Sana Shaikh. The album featuring five tracks was released under Zee Music Company on 19 November 2025.

== Development ==
Vishal Bhardwaj composed the soundtrack with lyrics written by Gulzar. Bhardwaj earlier worked with Vibhu in Hawaizaada (2015) as a guest composer. He accepted the offer owing to his friendship with the producer Manish Malhotra for whom Gustaakh Ishq was their debut production and had also credited Vibhu for creating a poetic and melodic album with music that defines the themes and characters.

== Release ==
The first single "Ul Jalool Ishq", was released on 16 September 2025. The second single "Aap Iss Dhoop Mein" was released on 7 October 2025. The third single "Sheher Tere" was released on 29 October 2025. The remaining songs were released along with the album on 19 November.

== Reception ==
Abhishek Srivatsava of The Times of India wrote "The Gulzar–Vishal Bhardwaj collaboration once again works its subtle spell, with Ul Julool, sung by Shilpa Rao and Papon, standing out on the soundtrack." Bollywood Hungama-based critic noted that except for "Ul Jalool Ishq" which was "catchy and lingers in one's mind for a long time", the rest of the songs were forgettable, further adding "A film like this ought to have a soundtrack that stands out, especially when it's composed by Vishal Bhardwaj". Shubhra Gupta of The Indian Express "it is left to the songs created by the inimitable Gulzar and Vishal Bharadwaj jugalbandi, to make us ache and sigh in the best way possible."

Vineeta Kumar of India Today wrote "Vishal Bhardwaj's compositions, paired with Gulzar's lyrics, add gloriously to the film's old-school soul, wrapping scenes in the ache of nostalgia. However, ironically, while the album beautifully suits the film's world, very little of it has a lasting aftertaste. Except for Ul Jalool Ishq, sung hauntingly by Shilpa Rao and Papon, which stays with you. The rest of the soundtrack never quite rises to the emotional pitch the story demands—a real bummer for a romance that should ideally thrive on unforgettable music." Rahul Desai of The Hollywood Reporter India wrote "the vintage mix of Gulzar’s lyrics and Vishal Bhardwaj’s compositions (especially the haunting guitar riffs in ‘Aap Is Dhoop Mein’) supply the flowery dialogue and expressions [where] the songs, for once, make you want to stay in them".

Sahir Avik D'Souza of The Quint wrote "Bhardwaj (along with his eternal collaborator Gulzar) fills the film with a familiar soundtrack, churning out songs in his typical, auteuristic style—the lilting ‘Ul Julool Ishq’ is in the tradition of ‘Dil Toh Bachcha Hai Ji’, while ‘Aap is Dhoop Mein’ follows his more meditative compositions such as ‘Jhelum’ and ‘Yeshu’." Nandini Ramnath of Scroll.in wrote "Vishal Bhardwaj’s soundtrack, with lyrics by Gulzar, isn’t period-appropriate but has a coule of lovely tunes, especially Ul Jalool Ishq." Rishabh Suri of Hindustan Times wrote "The music by Vishal Bhardwaj complements the story, especially the title track Ul Jalool Ishq". Subhash K. Jha of Deccan Herald wrote "Gulzar’s lyrics are, as expected, an asset. However, Vishal Bhardwaj’s music is nothing we haven’t heard before."

== Track listing ==
No.	Title	Singer(s)	Length
1.	"Ul Jalool Ishq"	Shilpa Rao, Papon	4:50
2.	"Aap Iss Dhoop Mein"	Arijit Singh	4:11
3.	"Sheher Tere"	Jazim Sharma, Himani Kapoor	5:33
4.	"Chal Musafir"	Armaan Malik	3:52
5.	"Hum Fanaa"	Javed Ali, Parvez Babblu	6:15
Total length:			24:41

== Personnel ==
Credits adapted from Zee Music Company:

- Music composer: Vishal Bhardwaj
- Music producer: Debarpito Saha, Meghdeep Bose
- Music arrangement: Meghdeep Bose
- Musical assistance: Anant Bhardwaj, Aabhaar Tomar, Sagar Sathe
- Recording: Salman Khan Afridi (Studio Satya, Mumbai), Ashish Biswal (Arijit Singh Studio, Kolkata), Meghdeep Bose (Sound Bakery, Mumbai), Leroy (LeMusic Studio, Chennai)
- Mixing: Vijay Dayal (YRF Studios, Mumbai), SoundsLikeTintin, Dipesh Sharma Batalvi (Sound Bakery, Mumbai)
- Mastering: Christian Wright (Abbey Road Studios, London)

Musicians

- Chorus: Vasudha Tiwari, Surabhi Khekale, Bandita Bharti, Shivika Rajesh, Shushmita Narayan, Vaishnavi Bhuyar, Sonal Choubisa, Anurag Puranik, Himal Patel, Anupam Mukherjee, Akaash Dubey, Rajiv Sundaresan, Rishikesh Kamerkar, Shazneen Arethna, Crystal Sequeira
- Guitar: Mayukh Sarkar, Shrey Gupta, Meghdeep Bose
- Bass, modular synths, whistle: Meghdeep Bose
- Veena: Punya Srinivas
- Dholak: Navim Sharma, Hafeez Khan, Sharafat Hussain, Raju Sardar, Mushtak Khan, Iqbal Azad, Manoj Bhati, Mohammed Shadab
- Tabla: Navim Sharma, Madhav Pawar, Yusuf Ghulam Mohd.
- Ghunghroo Tabla: Fateh Sulemani
- Tabla and rhythm arrangement: Sanjiv Sen
- 12 strings: Jayantilal Gosher
- Mandolin: Pradipta Sengupta, Nasir Qureshi
- Mandola: Chandrakant Lakshpati
- Banjo: Pradeep Pandit
