= Ufff Yeh Siyapaa =

Indian comedy thriller film

- Theatrical release poster
- Directed by: G. Ashok
- Written by: G. Ashok
- Produced by: Luv Ranjan; Ankur Garg
- Starring: Sohum Shah; Nushrratt Bharuccha; Nora Fatehi; Omkar Kapoor; Sharib Hashmi
- Cinematography: Nuthan Nagaraj
- Edited by: Chetan M. Solanki
- Music by: A. R. Rahman
- Production company: Luv Films
- Distributed by: PVR Inox Pictures
- Release date: 5 September 2025
- Running time: 116 minutes
- Country: India

Ufff Yeh Siyapaa a 2025 Indian comedy thriller film written and directed by G. Ashok and produced by Luv Ranjan and Ankur Garg's Luv Films. The film's score was composed by A.R. Rahman. It stars Sohum Shah, Nushrratt Bharuccha, Nora Fatehi, Omkar Kapoor and Sharib Hashmi. The film has no spoken dialogue. The film was released theatrically on 5 September 2025.

== Plot ==
In this uniquely wordless comedy of errors, Kesari Lal Singh (Sohum Shah), a sheepish common man, becomes embroiled in a spiralling series of mishaps after his wife, Pushpa (Nushratt Bharuccha), leaves him, believing he has been flirting with their neighbour, Kamini (Nora Fatehi). He has not, but before he can clear his name, a wrongly delivered drug parcel triggers a chain of escalating disasters, culminating in a dead body appearing in his home. As Kesari attempts to dispose of the evidence and restore order, another corpse turns up, transforming the house into a crime scene. Matters worsen when Police Inspector Hasmukh (Omkar Kapoor), who has a personal agenda, arrives and further complicates the situation. The resulting chaos unfolds as an absurd, darkly comic chain of events without a single spoken word.

== Cast ==
- Sohum Shah as Kesarilal Singh
- Nushtratt Bharuccha as Pushpa
- Nora Fatehi as Kamini
- Omkar Kapoor as Hasmukh
- Sharib Hashmi as Gungra
- Vijay Kumar Dogra as Undercover Cop

== Music ==
The film's original soundtrack is composed by A.R. Rahman.

Track listing
No.	Title	Lyrics	Singer(s)	Length
1.	"Dil Parinda"	Kumaar	A. R. Rahman	3:43
2.	"Tamancha"	Amitabh Bhattacharya	Sunidhi Chauhan	3:33
3.	"Naazuka"	Amitabh Bhattacharya	Mallika Barot	3:18
4.	"Darr Ke Aage Dance"	Kumaar	Benny Dayal	3:18
5.	"Darr Ke Aage Dance - Female"	Kumaar	Nomi Gene	3:30

== Reception ==
Archika Khurana of The Times of India rated it 3 out of 5 stars and wrote "Ufff Yeh Siyapaa is a fun ride — imperfect but inventive, proving silence can indeed be golden in comedy." Rahul Desai of The Hollywood Reporter India observed that "It’s hard to imagine a more misguided Hindi movie idea than that of a 116-minute comedy without any dialogue." Shubhra Gupta of The Indian Express rated it 0 stars out of 5 writes in her review that "What happened to Sohum Shah, the actor who left such an impact in Ship of Theseus and played the lead so assuredly in Tumbbad? Here his character, who gets major screen time, is just plain embarrassing."

BH Harsh of Cinema Express gave it 2 stars out of 5 and wrote that "Nushrratt Bharrucha is the only saving grace of this farcical comedy that is all over the place." Deepa Gahlot of Rediff.com gave it 2 stars out of 5 and writes that "Silent it may aim to be, but Ufff Yeh Siyapaa is as headache-inducing as an out-of-tune brass band." Nandini Ramnath of Scroll.in observed that "Ufff this movie, whose lack of dialogue is its only distinguishing element. G Ashok’s Ufff Yeh Siyapaa has little reason to exist beyond its gimmick."

Devesh Sharma of Filmfare rated it 2.5/5 stars and wrote that "Yet, for all its flaws, Ufff Yeh Siyapaa must be acknowledged for breaking out of formula and attempting the unthinkable in today’s Bollywood landscape. It may be drivel in parts, but it is also a reminder that experimentation, however messy, is still possible."
