= Screen Award for Best Cinematography =

The Screen Award for Best Cinematography is a technical award of The Screen Awards, (previously named Star Screen Awards), an annual awards ceremony held in India honouring professional excellence in the Bollywood Film Industry. The nomination and award selection is done by a panel of distinguished professionals from the industry.

The winners are listed below:-

Year	Winner (s)	Film
2020	Jay Oza	Gully Boy
2019	Pankaj Kumar	Tumbbad
2018	Pankaj Kumar	Rangoon
2017	Aseem Bajaj	Shivaay
2015	Sudeep Chatterjee	Bajirao Mastani
2014	Ravi Varman	Goliyon Ki Raasleela Ram-Leela
2012	Carlos Catalan	Zindagi Na Milegi Dobara
2008	Sudeep Chatterjee	Chak De India
2006	Ravi K. Chandran	Black
2005	Santosh Sivan	Meenaxi: A Tale of Three Cities
2004	Nirav Shah	Dhoom
2003	Binod Pradhan	Devdas
2002	Rajeev Jain	Badhaai Ho Badhaai
