= Crazxy =

2025 Hindi language Psychological thriller film

- Directed by: Girish Kohli
- Written by: Girish Kohli
- Produced by: Sohum Shah; Mukesh Shah; Amita Shah; Adesh Prasad; Ankit Jain
- Starring: Sohum Shah
- Cinematography: Sunil Borkar; Kuldeep Mamania
- Edited by: Sanyukta Kaza; Rythem Lath
- Music by: Songs: Vishal Bhardwaj; Laxmikant–Pyarelal; The Red Kettle; Manan Bhardwaj; KhullarG; Yeah Proof; Harshavardhan Rameshwar; Osho Jain; Score: Jesper Kyd
- Production company: Sohum Shah Films
- Distributed by: AA Films
- Release date: 28 February 2025
- Running time: 93 minutes
- Country: India
- Language: Hindi
- Budget: ₹4.4 crore (Note: ₹8.4 crore including print and advertising costs)
- Box office: est. ₹11.09 crore

Crazxy is a 2025 Indian Hindi-language thriller film written and directed by Girish Kohli in his directorial debut and produced by Sohum Shah, Mukesh Shah, Amita Shah and Adesh Prasad and co-produced by Ankit Jain under Sohum Shah Films. The film stars Sohum in the lead role and one of the only three on-screen characters, apart from his on-screen daughter and Prasad the abductor, as surgeon Abhimanyu Sood, who races against time to rescue his daughter from a kidnapper.

Kohli provided the script to Sohum in late 2019 and the latter decided to self-finance the film. Production began in 2022 and continued for two-and-a-half years, with cinematography handled by Sunil Borkar and Kuldeep Mamania, and edited by Sanyukta Kaza and Rythem Lath, whilst Jesper Kyd composed the original score. The film also featured a soundtrack composed by Vishal Bhardwaj, Laxmikant–Pyarelal, The Red Kettle, Manan Bhardwaj, KhullarG, Yeah Proof, Harshavardhan Rameshwar and Osho Jain.

Crazxy was theatrically released on 28 February 2025.

== Synopsis ==
Abhimanyu Sood, a surgeon, races against time to rescue his daughter from a kidnapper. A talented surgeon charged for a medical negligence has to pay the price for mistakes of his past.

== Cast ==
- Sohum Shah as Dr. Abhimanyu Sood

Voice-only roles

- Tinnu Anand as Gurudutt Prasad (cameo also)
- Nimisha Sajayan as Bobby, Abhimanyu's ex-wife
- Shilpa Shukla as "Jaan", Abhimanyu's girlfriend
- Piyush Mishra as "White Coat" / Dr. Nihal Chatterjee

== Production ==
=== Development ===
In May 2023, in an interaction with Ankita Kanabar of The Times of India, Sohum Shah described about his subsequent project Crazy which is "[just about] one character who is travelling alone in the car and the film slowly unfolds" and would feature him in different characters. In October 2024, during the re-release of Tumbbad (2018), Sohum officially announced the project under the title Crazxy. The film was produced by Sohum himself with Mukesh Shah, Amita Shah, Adesh Prasad with Ankit Jain serving as the co-producer, and was directed by screenwriter Girish Kohli in his directorial debut.

Girish provided him the script to Sohum in 2019, and the latter greenlit the project in early 2020, before the COVID-19 pandemic. However, as Sohum approached several studios, they declined it due to its non-commercial viability, resulting in Sohum financing the film under his own production. Sohum described the script as a "page turner" while reading the script and felt immediately connected with it. He played the role of Abhimanyu, a surgeon who races against time to rescue his kidnapped daughter, describing the role as "emotionally tough [and] physically demanding". The film also featured other actors, Tinnu Anand, Nimisha Sajayan and Shilpa Shukla, though many of them do not appear on-screen, and either their characters would be seen in photographs or voice calls.

=== Filming ===
Principal photography began in 2022 and took nearly two-and-a-half years for the film's production. Much of the film was completed in a single schedule. Sohum also drove in the chase sequences, which were considered to be dangerous and found acting and driving simultaneously was not that easy. Kohli recalled an incident where filming was halted due to the heavy rainfall in Chambal. The cars were stuck in the mud, which resulted in the actors to walk through knee-deep sludge to continue production and tractors being brought in to pull the vehicles out, and the team resumed filming the following day. Another incident happened, in where the filming was held in a remote village in Maharashtra, a group of villagers stole the counterfeit money which was used for shooting, mistakenly for real money. Afterwards, the crew announced the village about the incident, after which the villagers returned the money to the crew members. The film was made on a production budget of ₹4 crore (US$420,000) with print and advertising costs of around ₹4.4 crore (US$460,000), accounting the overall costs to around ₹8.4 crore (US$870,000).

== Soundtrack ==
Jesper Kyd has composed the original score. The songs are composed by Vishal Bhardwaj, Laxmikant–Pyarelal, Anand Bakshi, Jesper Kyd, Harshavardhan Rameshwar and Osho Jain. The lyrics have been written by Gulzar.

Track listing
No.	Title	Lyrics	Music	Singer(s)	Length
1.	"Mitron Maidaan"	Ashim Kemson	Harshavardhan Rameshwar	Babbu Maan	3:24
2.	"Paapi"	Manan Bhardwaj	Manan Bhardwaj	Romy, Khullar G (Rap)	3:39
3.	"Pul"	Gulzar	Vishal Bhardwaj	Vishal Mishra	4:23
4.	"Paapi 2.0"	Manan Bhardwaj	Manan Bhardwaj, Yeah Proof	Romy, Khullar G (Rap)	2:42
5.	"O Papa"	Gulzar	Vishal Bhardwaj	Devika Sharma	4:15
6.	"Chann Ve"	Gulzar	Vishal Bhardwaj	Sukhwinder Singh	3:40
7.	"O Papa (Orchestral)"	Gulzar	Vishal Bhardwaj	Devika Sharma, Vishal Bhardwaj	4:38
8.	"Yun Hi Chale Gaye"	Osho Jain	Osho Jain	KS Chithra	4:41
9.	"Goli Maar Bheje Mein"	Gulzar	Vishal Bhardwaj	Mano Ila Arun	3:38
10.	"Abhimanyu"	Anand Bakshi	Kaizad Gherda, Laxmikant–Pyarelal	Kishore Kumar	3:46
Total length:					38:08

== Release ==
=== Theatrical ===
Crazxy was initially announced for theatrical release on 7 March 2025, but was advanced to 28 February. Its current release was announced with a promotional video that featured Tumbbad's principal characters—Hastar, Daadi and Vinayak. The film's teaser trailer was released on 5 February, followed by the theatrical trailer on 17 February. The film was distributed by AA Films across Indian theatres.

In response to the audience's feedback, the makers decided to change the climax and screen the film with the new climax from 7 March 2025.

=== Pre-release business ===
Crazxy's satellite, digital, and music rights were sold for ₹15 crore. The film will begin streaming on Amazon Prime Video from 25 April 2025.

== Reception ==
=== Box office ===
The film had a slow start, earning ₹0.80 crore on its opening day in India. Over its opening weekend, it collected approximately ₹3.25 crore.

The film maintained a moderate pace and ended its first week with a total of ₹5.70 crore in India. By the end of its second week, it had collected ₹10.10 crore, and its final lifetime total in India stood at ₹11.09 crore.

=== Critical response ===
Crazxy received positive reviews from critics, who praised Sohum Shah's performance and the film's tense atmosphere.

Dhaval Roy of The Times of India rated 4/5 stars and observed that "With its Tarantinoesque blend of tension, style, raw intensity, and a homage to Amitabh Bachchan, Crazxy pushes boundaries and is a must-watch for its bold storytelling and character study" Devesh Sharma of Filmfare gave 3.5 stars out of 5 nd commeneted that "Crazxy is a road movie with twists and turns aplenty. Sohum Shah has given his career best performance as the central character." Rishil Jogani of Pinkvilla rated 3.5/5 stars and said that "Despite slight lags in the screenplay, Crazxy emerges as a bold, interesting film that dares to be different. While not flawless, its newness and Kohli's vision make it a compelling watch. Fans of survival thrillers will find plenty to love, from Sohum Shah's powerhouse performance, to the chilling cinematography and heart-thumping background score."

Saibal Chatterjee of NDTV give 3 stars out of 5 and said that "Crazxy isn't an average crowd-pleaser. It dares to be different and sticks to its guns. That is where the appeal of the film lies." Sana Farzeen of India Today gave 3 stars out of 5 and observed that "Sohum Shah leads Crazxy with a gripping solo act, but the climax falters. The film excels in storytelling, performances, and music, yet its melodramatic ending may deter some viewers." Rishabh Suri of Hindustan Times gave 2.5 stars out of 5 and said in his review that "Crazxy has a few things going for it. But it is far from being a delicious ride, with quite a few loopholes along the way."

Critic of Bollywood Hungama gave 2 stars out of 5 and pointed out that "On the whole, Crazxy rests on Sohum Shah's bravura performance and some engaging moments. But the film suffers big time due to the disappointing climax. The limited hype might further affect its box office prospects." Shubhra Gupta of The Indian Express rated 2/5 stars and commented that "The absence of other actors—their presence reduced to their voices—is a problem too, leaving Sohum Shah to gamely handle the screen practically single-handed, which makes it even more of a stretch."

Rahul Desai of The Hollywood Reporter India commeneted that "Like most single-character movies, Crazxy works hard to stay visually and kinetically interesting. It depends heavily on the shot-taking, the sound design, Shah's physical acting and the editing. Thankfully, the craft does not go overboard to offset the real-time premise." Ganesh Aaglave of Firstpost in his review said that "Crazxy is easily one of the best Bollywood thrillers in recent times and must be watched on the big screen to enjoy the engrossing experience." Murtuza Iqbal of The Free Press Journal said that in review that "Sohum Shah and Girish Kohli have surely tried to give the audiences something unique, and they mostly succeed in it. But, with a better pace and some more twists and turns, this movie would have actually been Crazy! Well, you can surely watch it once but don't go to theatres with the Tumbbad kind of a movie expectation."

Moneycontrol described the film as an "edge-of-the-seat thrilling solo ride," highlighting Sohum Shah's commanding screen presence and the claustrophobic setting that enhances the tension. ABP News awarded the film 4 stars out of 5, calling it a "93-minute edge-of-the-seat thriller" and praising the film's ability to maintain tension throughout its runtime. Zee News appreciated the film's thrilling elements and Shah's performance. Punjab Kesari commended the film's ability to maintain audience engagement throughout its runtime.
