= Aida El-Kashef =

Egyptian actress

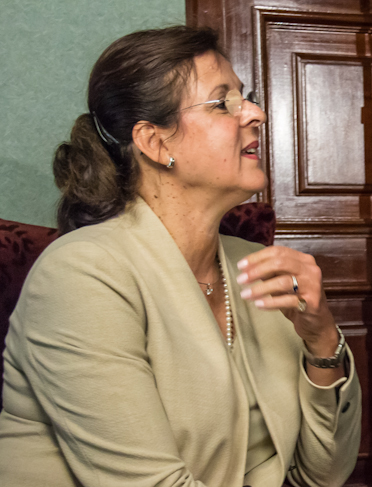
- El-Kashef in 2012
- Born: 1988 (age 37–38); Cairo, Egypt
- Occupations: Independent filmmaker, journalist, actress

Aida El-Kashef is a feminist Egyptian filmmaker and actress. Her acting credits include Ship of Theseus and Walad w Bent. She has also directed the short films A Tin Tale and Rhapsody in Autumn.

== Biography ==
El-Kashef was involved in the protests at Tahrir Square, where she filmed the events of the Arab Spring as they unfolded. She was one of the first protestors to occupy Tahrir where she set up a tent. She also documented "aggressive assaults against women" that occurred during the protests often risking her own personal safety. El-Kashef's films of men sexually assaulting women were shown worldwide and El-Kashef and her friends vowed to fight back, carrying electric prods and knives as protection. She was arrested and detained for her participation in the No Military Trials for Civilians protest. El-Kashef missed the promotion of Ship of Theseus in India while she was protesting. Another aspect of the protests was her involvement in filming the grief of family members who raided the Zeinhom Morgue in Cairo to see their loved ones one last time.

In 2014, El-Kashef received a grant for Ward No 3 from SANAD, which is the development and post-production fund for the Abu Dhabi Film Festival.

Also in 2014, El-Kashef won best supporting actress from the Indian National Film Awards for her role in Ship of Theseus. She also won Best Actress for the Muhr AsiaAfrica Feature category at the Dubai International Film Festival for her role in Ship of Theseus in 2012.

In November, 2015, El-Kashef began crowdfunding the partial costs of producing her first full-length documentary, a film tackling the subject of domestic abuse in Egypt. In The Day I Ate The Fish, Aida documents several marriages where a woman murdered her spouse.
