= Pankaj Kumar (cinematographer) =

Indian cinematographer

- Education: Film and Television Institute of India
- Occupation: Cinematographer
- Notable work: Ship of Theseus; Haider; Tumbbad; Brahmāstra: Part One – Shiva; Farzi

Pankaj Kumar is an Indian cinematographer. He is known for his work on films like Haider, Tumbbad and Ship of Theseus among others. He won the Filmfare Award for Best Cinematography for Tumbbad in 2019.

== Early life ==
He was educated at the Film and Television Institute of India.

He completed his schooling from Kendriya Vidyalaya, Hakimpet, Secunderabad in 1993.

== Early career ==
He made his debut with the Ship of Theseus (2012) and subsequently with Haider (2014), Talvar (2015), and Rangoon (2017).

== Filmography ==
As a cinematographer

Year	Film	Director(s)	Notes	Ref
2006	Continuum	Anand Gandhi and Khushboo Ranka	Short film; Also Editor	
2007	Aditi Singh	Mickael Kummer	Short film	
2009	Andheri	Sushrut Jain	Short film	
2013	Ship of Theseus	Anand Gandhi	Also Writer	
2014	Haider	Vishal Bhardwaj		
2015	Talvar	Meghna Gulzar		
2017	Daddy	Ashim Ahluwalia		
2017	Rangoon	Vishal Bhardwaj		
2017	Kalachakra - L'éveil	Fuchs Natalie	Documentary film	
2018	Tumbbad	Rahi Anil Barve		
2019	Judgementall Hai Kya	Prakash Kovelamudi		
2020	Raat Akeli Hai	Honey Trehan		
2020	Unpaused	Raj & DK	Segment: "Glitch"	
2021	Atrangi Re	Aanand L. Rai		
2022	Brahmāstra: Part One – Shiva	Ayan Mukerji		
2023	The Tenant	Sushrut Jain		
2023	Farzi	Raj & DK	Amazon Prime Video Series	
2023	Guns & Gulaabs	Raj & DK	Netflix Series	
2025	Khauf	Himself	Amazon Prime Series	
2026	Ramayana: Part 1	Nitesh Tiwari		
2027	Ramayana: Part 2 †	Nitesh Tiwari		

== Awards and nominations ==
Filmfare Awards

Year	Category	Work	Result
2014	Best Story	Ship of Theseus	Nominated
2018	Best Cinematography	Daddy	Nominated
2018	Best Cinematography	Rangoon	Nominated
2019	Best Cinematography	Tumbbad	Won
2020	Best Cinematography	Judgementall Hai Kya	Nominated

Screen Awards

Year	Category	Work	Result
2014	Best Cinematography	Ship of Theseus	Nominated
2015	Best Cinematography	Haider	Nominated
2017	Best Cinematography	Daddy	Nominated
2018	Best Cinematography	Rangoon	Won
2019	Best Cinematography	Tumbbad	Won

Other awards

Year	Award	Category	Work	Result
2012	Mumbai International Film Festival	Silver Gateway Jury Prize for Technical Excellence	Ship of Theseus	Won
2012	Jagran Film Festival	Best Cinematography	Ship of Theseus	Won
2012	Tokyo International Film Festival	Best Artistic Contribution Award	Ship of Theseus	Won
2013	Transilvania International Film Festival	Best Cinematography	Ship of Theseus	Won
2018	Sitges - Catalonian International Film Festival	Best Cinematography	Tumbbad	Won
2018	FOI Online Awards	Best Cinematography	Tumbbad	Won
2019	Asian Film Awards	Best Cinematographer	Tumbbad	Nominated
2019	Zee Cine Awards	Best Cinematography	Tumbbad	Won
2019	Critics Choice Film Awards	Best Cinematography	Tumbbad	Won
