= Simran (film) =

2017 Indian film by Hansal Mehta

- Directed by: Hansal Mehta
- Written by: Apurva Asrani
- Produced by: Bhushan Kumar; Krishan Kumar; Shailesh R Singh; Amit Agarwal (film producer)
- Starring: Kangana Ranaut; Sohum Shah; Hiten Kumar; Kishori Shahane
- Cinematography: Anuj Rakesh Dhawan
- Edited by: Antara Lahiri
- Music by: Score: Hitesh Modak; Songs: Sachin–Jigar
- Production companies: T-Series; Paramhans Creations Entertainments; Adarsh Telemedia
- Distributed by: AA Films
- Release date: 15 September 2017
- Running time: 124 minutes
- Country: India
- Language: Hindi
- Budget: ₹28 crore
- Box office: est. ₹27.25 crore

Simran is a 2017 Indian Hindi-language heist drama film directed by Hansal Mehta in a screenplay written by Apurva Asrani. Loosely based on the real- life story of Sandeep Kaur, the film stars Kangana Ranaut as Praful Patel, a divorcee, who loses her savings in a gambling bout. She takes a loan in order to repair the damage but when she is unable to repay it, she finds herself drawn into a life of crime. Hiten Kumar, Kishori Shahane and Sohum Shah are featured in supporting roles.

Simran was released worldwide on 15 September 2017. The film was met with generally positive reviews from the film critics; Ranaut's performance was widely praised, though the film drew some mixed reviews and criticism for its screenplay and execution. Critics like Baradwaj Rangan and Stutee Ghosh listed Ranaut as the Best Actress of the year 2017 for her performance in Simran. It became a commercial failure grossing ₹27.25 crore globally against the budget of ₹28 crore. The film was deemed a box office disappointment owing to Ranaut's star power. For her performance, Ranaut received a nomination for the Screen Award for Best Actress.

== Plot ==
(Kangana Ranaut) is a young divorcee who lives with her parents and works in the housekeeping department in one of the five-star hotels of Atlanta, Georgia, USA.

She shares a bitter relationship with her dad who is always blaming her for her mistakes in the past, instead of giving her moral support; so now, Praful wants to move out and buy her own house.

She has applied for a loan and her loan gets pre-approved. In the meantime, Praful decides to go with her cousin on a trip to Las Vegas (her cousin pays for all tickets and accommodations).

In Las Vegas, she plays baccarat for the first time and wins big in her first few rounds. She quickly gets addicted to the game. The next day, she returns to the casino but ends up losing not only the money she won the previous day but a large chunk of her savings also.

Praful then returns to Atlanta after a week, only to find out that her bank application to the bank has been rejected as her credit rating is very low. Praful seeks her father's help but he insists that she should meet a young man named Sameer (Sohum Shah) who has been selected as her suitor.

After meeting with the suitor, she has mixed feelings about marriage and agrees to get engaged. However, her addiction to gambling takes a toll on her and Praful gives her last shot to gambling and goes back to Vegas.

Unfortunately, she ultimately loses all her savings so a private money lender spots Praful (who is now drunk) in the casino and offers her money. The drunk Praful – not in her right senses- takes $32,000 from the moneylender and in exchange gives him her driving license.

Praful loses all that borrowed money (along with her hard-earned savings) and has to return penniless to her home.

Praful tries to explain to her father her bad situation and needing his financial help, but in fear of retaliation and hostility, she is reluctant. Her parents want her to begin her wedding preparations and plans with Sameer, who by now gets impressed by her personality.

At a relative's wedding, Praful and Sameer meet again and dance, and get to know each other. However, Praful is threatened by the loan sharks to pay within 10 days or face death, so she is disturbed and anxious, unable to concentrate on her wedding plans.

Therefore, Praful develops the habit of stealing whereby first she disguises herself (wearing oversized sunglasses and a hood) and approaches a cashier at a gas station shop. She collects only $10,000 so she has to go and rob a bank (which she learns how to on YouTube), with a disguise, and hands a note written with red lipstick that says money should be given to her otherwise she will blow the whole bank as she is strapped to a bomb.

Praful's second robbery gets foiled by a bank manager who bumps into her when she tries to rob the bank similarly. When the manager asks her name, Praful tells her name 'Simran', the name of a popular character from an Indian blockbuster film Dilwale Dulhania Le Jayenge which her mother ultimately watches often.

Although Praful's plan to rob the bank gets foiled, she manages to escape and similarly robs another bank.

Praful Patel has now become a most wanted criminal with the name 'Simran – The Lipstick Bandit'. Despite robbing 3 to 4 banks successfully, Praful is still short of collecting fifty thousand dollars.

Meanwhile, Praful develops a liking towards Sameer, and confides in him her bad habits of gambling and stealing which he does not take seriously, thinking it is some kind of a joke. Trouble comes back when loan sharks attack Praful in her hotel for the money and Praful's ex-boyfriend Mike – the general manager of the hotel steals the money from her locker room and refuses to give the money back to her until and unless she submits to his sexual advances/desires.

Praful ultimately hits him and gets suspended from the hotel, after which she tells the loan sharks that her money has been stolen. By now, these loan sharks know that Praful is actually 'Simran – The Lipstick Bandit', so they ask her to rob one more bank and this time with a bigger amount—for which they offer her a gun to finish the job.

Devastated and dejected, Praful calls off her relationship with Sameer and asks him to leave and by telling him the truth. Enraged by this, Praful's father slaps her and asks her to leave his house.

Praful leaves her home and stays with her best friend Salma (Esha Tewari) for a night. The next day Praful attacks the same bank that rejected her bank loan and flees the place after stealing the money.

Sameer is still in love with Praful and to help her, he transfers a huge amount of fifty thousand dollars in her bank account.

Praful, before leaving the city of Atlanta, calls him at a lonely place and tells him that he should find another girl, as he is a nice man and he deserves someone better; not someone like her.

Sameer refuses and asks her to surrender to the police and end this dirty game once and for all; after which Praful's dad calls her and asks for forgiveness. Praful is happy at this and returns home but the police cars have surrounded her and are following her car to arrest her.

Praful drives off because she did not want to get arrested in her neighbourhood, which is full of Indians, and her parents would be very ashamed of her there. The ultimate chase begins as Praful's car is found empty by the police. Praful had taken a taxi and was almost near the airport, but then she decides to surrender on a lonely highway. She asks the taxi to stop at the curbside and then she calls 9–1–1 and surrenders herself.

After her arrest, there is a trial whereby the judge adjudicates Praful to be imprisoned for 10 months, but she is released after 3–4 months due to good behaviour. Her ex-boyfriend Mike is also imprisoned for stealing her money and also for his sexual advance.

During a meeting session in prison, Praful tells her father that she wants to invest all his money into the stock market. Enraged by this, Praful's father becomes angry and grabs her neck angrily, venting his frustration that all his hard-earned money will blow up in smoke due to her crazy intentions.

The film ends with titles suggesting that Praful has been released from jail and she has sold the rights of her movie to be made to a Bollywood producer for fifty thousand dollars.

== Cast ==
- Kangana Ranaut as Praful Patel a.k.a. "Simran"– The Lipstick Bandit"
- Hiten Kumar as Praful's father
- Kishori Shahane as Praful's mother
- Sohum Shah as Sameer Mehta
- Nawazuddin Siddiqui as Sapeen
- Rajiv Nema as Sameer's uncle
- Monica Chitkara as Sameer's aunt
- Usha Jarajani as Praful's maternal grandmother
- Rupinder Nagra as Mike Mehndi
- Karishma Tanna as Baggi
- Aneesha Joshi as Amber
- Esha Tewari as Salma
- James Cole as Steven
- Catherine Dyer as Cynthia
- Mark Justice (actor) as Adam
- Rusty Meyers as Michael
- Jeff Rose as Robert
- Timothy Ryan Hickernell as Joe
- Maiya Boyd as Salma's daughter Malala
- Jason Louder as Mr Bugs
- Albert Roberts as Jerry
- Nikhil Dhawan as Nikhil
- Mona Mathews as Aunt
- Suraj Vyas as Dave Mehta

== Production ==
=== Development ===
The official announcement of the film was announced in the second quarter of 2015. The title of the film was said to be Simran.

=== Filming ===
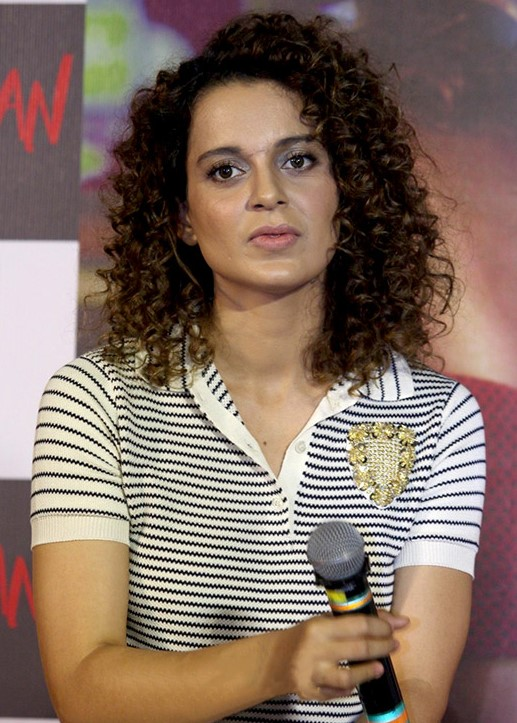
Kangana Ranaut at the launch of Simran trailer

The principal photography of the film commenced sometime in May 2016. The film is shot in Atlanta, United States. Production began in March 2016 and principal photography commenced in October 2016 at Atlanta, United States.

== Reception ==
=== Box office ===
The film opened to disastrous response from the audience, with occupancy being around 12 percent. During the first week, the film collected "almost ₹150 million." As of 5 October 2017, the film earned ₹27.62 crore worldwide on budget ₹ 170 million.

=== Critical response ===
Upon release, Simran was met with generally positive reviews from the film critics as well as audience; Ranaut's performance was widely praised, though the film drew some mixed reviews and criticism for its screenplay and execution. On the review aggregator website Rotten Tomatoes, the film holds a rating of 70% based on 10 reviews and an average rating of 5.6/10. On the Indian film review aggregator website The Review Monk, Simran received an average score of 5.5/10 based on 22 reviews and 62% critics being in the favor.

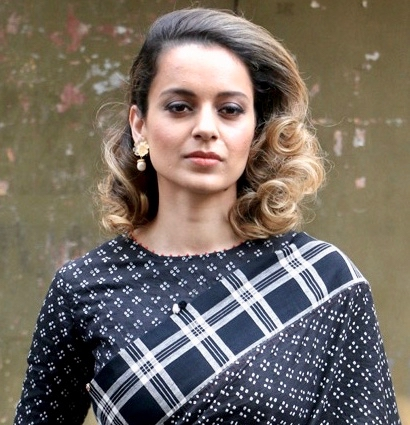
Kangana Ranaut's performance in Simran received praise from the film critics.

Rajeev Masand of CNN-IBN gave Simran 3 out of 5 stars, arguing that "There's ample meat in the story, yet the writing itself is weak. But it's a testament to Kangana's a full-liquified performance that Simran works despite these complaints." Shubra Gupta of The Indian Express praised Ranaut's performance but criticized the storyline saying "With her plain unvarnished face, and mobile features, she comes across as a real, solid, complex woman, someone you can reach out and touch. It's a pity her own story lets her down." She gave the film 3 out of 5 stars. According to Meena Iyer of The Times of India, who gave Simran 3.5 out of 5 stars, "The only one who is having a good time here is Kangana. Whether she's docile or daring, the actress goes about her screen business with a flourish; getting her mannerisms pat." Anupama Chopra of Film Companion gave 2.5 out of 5 stars insisting that "the writing is the weakest part of the film." She described Ranaut's work as "Kangana's lack of vanity onscreen is among her many strengths. She isn't afraid to look unattractive or behave badly."

From Rediff.com, Vaihayasi Pande Daniel gave Simran 3 out of 5 stars "Simran is a light-hearted, time-pass film not attempting to explore any higher themes." Pointing to some contrivances Kunal Gupta of Mumbai Mirror gave 2.5 out of 5 stars slating the film's casual tone as distracting and desensitizing during the crime scenes. Umesh Punwani from Koimoi declared "Simran is all about Kangana Ranaut, 5 minutes into the film and you know this is going to be special. Where Hansal Mehta's last film Aligarh was a dark sky, Simran is a shining cloud in his sky." He rated the film 3 out of 5 stars. Anita Iyer of Khaleej Times gave 3 out of 5 stars saying, "Hansal Mehta, known for his critically acclaimed films like 'Shahid' and 'Citylights', handles the subject with care and doesn't glorify the character."

Criticizing the screenplay Rohit Bhatnagar from Deccan Chronicle gave 2.5 out of 5 stars claiming, "The film is surely enjoyable till the interval but suddenly dips down in the second half...with its abrupt ending." But, he praised the performance saying "Inarguably, Kangana Ranaut is the saving grace of this sinking ship." On Firstpost, Anna M. M. Vetticad gave Simran 3 out of 5 stars praising the direction, saying, "Director Hansal Mehta must be lauded for his conviction, his confidence in the written material at hand and the clarity he has about how he wishes to tell Praful's tale—steering clear of seamy, overtly grim territory and driving home the weirdness of it all." He termed Kangana as the heartbeat of the film. Stutee Ghosh of Quint gave 4 out of 5 stars. She also praised the performances but criticized the 'underwhelming' climax.

Praising Ranaut's performance and Mehta's direction Subhash K. Jha gave 3.5 out of 5 stars expressing "Kangana looks so much at home in her character, we feel she must have been Praful Patel in an earlier life." He further added, "Hansal Mehta never sentimentalizes Simran's anti-social behaviour." Writing for The Wire Nehmat Kaur also praised lead performances and direction but criticized the 'stretched' screenplay. Regarding the setting of the film Filmfare wrote with a rating of 3.5 out of 5 stars "This comedy is well-written and executed. Sometimes, Simran is a little too American, but that's a guilty pleasure worth having." Appreciating the cinematography and music, The Statesman rated 3.5 out of 5 stars writing "Cinematographer Anuj Dhawan, captures Atlanta in all its hues and the pulsating Vegas in all its glory. The music by Sachin-Jigar is apt and adds charm to the situations. 'Meet' and 'Pinjra Tod Ke' are melodious and soulful."

Namrata Joshi of The Hindu expressed "Simran offers the possibility of an interesting study—of ambitions, dreams and the incredible lure of money and how it affects individuals and relationships." She criticized the screenplay and wished it to be less chaotic. Mohar Basu of Mid-Day rated 3 (out of 5) stars concluding "The quirky perspective at finding laughs in troubled times is a refreshing way of viewing problems. And then there's Kangana, making badass look simple, human and so full of heart." Ananya Bhattacharya for India Today rated 2.5 out of 5 stars concluding "At the end of the film, the only thing you exit the theatre with is Kangana's effortless performance."

== Soundtrack ==
Simran

Soundtrack album by Sachin–Jigar
- Released: 25 August 2017
- Genre: Feature film soundtrack
- Length: 28:29
- Language: Hindi
- Label: T-Series

Sachin–Jigar chronology
Bhoomi (2017)	Simran (2017)	Parmanu: The Story of Pokhran (2018)
External audio
- Official Audio Jukebox on YouTube

The music of the film have been composed by Sachin–Jigar while the lyrics have been penned by Priya Saraiya and Vayu. The first song titled as "Lagdi Hai Thaai" which is sung by Guru Randhawa and Jonita Gandhi was released on 11 August 2017. The second single to be released was "Pinjra Tod Ke" voiced by Sunidhi Chauhan was released on 18 August 2017. The soundtrack consists of 8 songs and was released by T-Series on 25 August 2017.

All music is composed by Sachin–Jigar.

Track listing
No.	Title	Lyrics	Singer(s)	Length
1.	"Lagdi Hai Thaai"	Vayu	Guru Randhawa, Jonita Gandhi	2:45
2.	"Pinjra Tod Ke"	Priya Saraiya	Sunidhi Chauhan	4:45
3.	"Meet"	Priya Saraiya	Arijit Singh	3:35
4.	"Majaa Ni Life"	Vayu	Shalmali Kholgade, Divya Kumar	3:19
5.	"Simran"	Priya Saraiya	Jigar Saraiya	2:58
6.	"Baras Ja"	Priya Saraiya	Mohit Chauhan	3:52
7.	"Single Rehne De"	Vayu	Shalmali Kholgade, Divya Kumar	3:19
8.	"Meet" (Female)	Priya Saraiya	Aditi Singh Sharma	3:56
Total length:				28:29
