= Tumbbad, Maharashtra =

Village in Maharashtra, India

Coordinates: 17.603180°N 73.407662°E

Tumbbad (alternative spelling: Tumbad) is a village located on the banks of Jagbudi River in the Khed taluka of Ratnagiri district in the Konkan division of Mahrashtra, India. The village is about 100 kilometres away from the Koyna Wildlife Sanctuary and is known for harboring mugger crocodiles.

== Geography ==
Tumbbad is located in the Konkan coastal belt. The Jagbudi River and the surrounding forested hills form part of the natural environment of the area.

== Popular Culture ==
The 2018 Indian historical period fantasy horror film Tumbbad is set in the village and was shot on location.

== See also ==
- Khed, Ratnagiri
