= Narayan Dharap =

Marathi Writer

- Died: 18 August 2008 (aged 82); Pune, Maharashtra, India
- Occupation: Writer
- Writing career
- Language: Marathi
- Genres: Horror fiction, weird fiction

Narayan Dharap (27 August 1925 – 18 August 2008) was an Indian writer, primarily of horror fiction in the Marathi language. He wrote more than 100 books and was the first Marathi author to bring H. P. Lovecraft's Cthulhu Mythos to Marathi readers. He was also a writer of science fiction and drama.

Dharap earned a B.Sc. (Chemistry) degree from Mumbai University and had lived in Africa for some time for work. He died in Pune on 18 August 2008 due to pneumonia, having suffered from lung disease for some time.

== Work ==
The main characters which can be found often in his stories or novels are: Samartha, Appa Joshi, Krishnachandra, Pant and Jaidev. There are assorted stories as well, in which there can be individual heroes/heroines who overcome a situation, sometimes with a little external help, sometimes without it. Most of his stories feature a great battle between good and evil, usually concluding with good triumphant. Dharap's stories also come from Marathi culture. The general characteristics of Dharap's books include "a victory of good over evil", "origination of the concepts in the book from Marathi culture", "keeping the story away from any kind of sexual references (which is considered an important factor in any "popular" horror or suspense literature)", "despite the books being of the horror genre, keeping the contents away from any kind of gore or offense against 'good taste'".

Horror writing is still not seen with the reverence the way other types of writings are seen in Marathi literature. Narayan Dharap is loved by most Marathi readers who have some interest in the horror genre. He wrote some strikingly original stories based on weird fiction in Marathi, also he introduced fictional mythologies in Marathi horror literature for the first time.

Some of Dharap's novels and stories :"Aaji", published in the short story collection Anolkhi Disha 3, "Aaji" along with "Bali" another short from the collection Padchhaya served as a basis for the 2018 Indian horror film Tumbbad.

== Characters ==
- Samartha: Samartha is one of the main characters that can be found in many of Dharap's novels. He is a powerful saint-like person, who helps people out of difficult situations involving bad supernatural powers. He himself is a possessor of great supernatural power, which he has earned with great efforts. He is generally assisted by Appa Joshi, who is a common man with a good heart and highly esteems Samartha.
- Krishnachandra: Like Samartha, Krishnachandra too is a possessor of great supernatural powers, which he uses to help people in trouble (again with bad supernatural powers/ possessors of those powers/people helping these bad powers). However, unlike Samartha, he enjoys worldly pleasures as well. He is sometimes assisted by a character called Omkar.
- Pant: Pant is another character that can be found in a couple of Dharap's stories. However, he doesn't appear in as many books as Samartha and Krishnachandra do. He is a great Tantrik, whose prayer room can appear anywhere he wants. There are some brutal forces hidden behind the statues of various animals in those rooms, which help him to fight against brutal evil in the story.
- Jaidev: Jaidev is an occultist with supernatural powers. He uses his divine abilities to help people and cure them from the attacks of evil forces. His appearance is very similar to Samartha.

== Bibliography ==
Novels

- Samartha (1968)
- Kata (1970)
- Angarika (1976)
- Chaya (1971)
- Samarthanchi Sahase (1970)
- Ubhe Adave Dhage (1969)
- Krishna (1971)
- Samarthanchi Shakti (1972)
- Kajli (1970)
- Bujagavane (1971)

Short story collections

- Anolkhi Disha (adapted into a television series of the same name)
  - Anolkhi Disha 1
  - Anolkhi Disha 2
  - Anolkhi Disha 3
- Padchhaya

Short stories

- "Krishnachandra"
- "Samarthachiya Sevaka"
- "Chetakeen"
- "Dast"
- "Samarthancha Prahar"
- "Shapath" (inspired by Stephen King's It and "Gramma")
- "Sathe"
- "Fayakas"
- "Aaji" (from the collection Anolkhi Disha 3, based on King's "Gramma" and adapted into the 2018 horror film Tumbbad)
- "Bali" (from the collection Padchhaya, adapted into the 2018 horror film Tumbbad)
