= Sohum Shah =

Indian Actor

- Born: 16 December 1983 (age 42); Sri Ganganagar, Rajasthan, India
- Occupation: Actor • producer
- Years active: 2009–present
- Organization: Sohum Shah Films
- Known for: Crazxy, Tumbbad, Ship of Theseus
- Spouse: Amita Shah

Sohum Shah is an Indian entrepreneur, actor and producer who works in Hindi films. He was born on 16th December 1983. He made his first screen appearance in 2009 with the film Baabarr, where he played the antagonist and later appeared in the 2012 National Award-winning film Ship of Theseus which was produced under his banner, Recyclewala Films. Following his debut, Shah featured in Talvar (2015) and Simran (2017). His 2018 film Tumbbad, as producer and actor, received critical acclaim. He played in silent comedy thriller Ufff Yeh Siyapaa (2025).

== Life and career ==
Sohum Shah was born in Sri Ganganagar, Rajasthan, India. After establishing his real estate business he shifted to Mumbai to make films. He started his own production house, Recyclewala Films, to create content-driven films. His first film was the critically acclaimed Ship of Theseus (2012), where he played the role of a socially incognizant stockbroker. The film won a National Film Award for Best Feature Film for Sohum Shah as a producer.

Next, he was offered the role of a policeman in Meghna Gulzar's Talvar, based on the 2008 Noida double murder case. In 2017, Shah was cast alongside Kangana Ranaut in Hansal Mehta's Simran. Tumbbad, the project Shah worked on for 6-7 years, released on 12 October 2018 and garnered rave reviews from the critics and audience alike. Tumbbad was the first Indian film to be screened as an opening film at the Venice International Film Festival (75th edition).

Shah is also set to appear in Sudhanshu Saria's Sanaa after wrapping up the film with co-stars Radhika Madan and Pooja Bhatt in 2021.

== Filmography ==
=== Films ===
Year	Title	Role	Notes
2009	Baabarr	Baabarr Qureshi	
2012	Gulabi Gang	—N/a	Presenter; documentary
2013	Ship of Theseus	Navin Parnami	Also producer
2015	Talvar	ACP Vedant Mishra	
2017	Simran	Sameer Mehta	
2018	Tumbbad	Vinayak Rao	Also producer
2020	Gulabi Lens	Ravi	Also producer; short film
2021	The Big Bull	Viren Shah	
2022	Sanaa	Sheel	
2024	Demons	Naveen	Also producer; short film
2025	Crazxy	Abhimanyu	Also producer
2025	Ufff Yeh Siyapaa	Kesari Lal Singh	

=== Television ===
Year	Title	Role	Notes
2019	Bard of Blood	Vikramjit Singh	5 episodes
2021-2024	Maharani	CM Bheema Bharti	14 episodes
2023	Dahaad	Kailash Parghi	8 episodes
