= O'Romeo (soundtrack) =

Soundtrack album by Vishal Bhardwaj
- Released: 13 February 2026
- Recorded: 2024–2026
- Genre: Feature film soundtrack
- Length: 48:22
- Language: Hindi
- Label: T-Series
- Producers: Meghdeep Bose; Ketan Sodha; Jehangir Jehangir; Stuart Dacosta

Vishal Bhardwaj chronology
| Gustaakh Ishq (2025) | O'Romeo (2026) |
External audio
- Audio Jukebox on YouTube

O'Romeo is the soundtrack album to the 2026 film of the same name directed by Vishal Bhardwaj featuring an ensemble cast of Shahid Kapoor, Triptii Dimri, Nana Patekar, Avinash Tiwary, Tamannaah Bhatia, Disha Patani, Farida Jalal and Aruna Irani. The soundtrack featured 12 songs composed by Bhardwaj and written by Gulzar and was released through T-Series on 13 February 2026.

== Background ==
Like his previous directorial ventures, Bhardwaj also composed the music for O'Romeo with his norm collaborator Gulzar writing the lyrics. The album featured 12 songs sung by Arijit Singh, Sukhwinder Singh, Rekha Bhardwaj, Madhubanti Bagchi, Javed Ali, Soba Singh Sitara, Ananya Wadkar. While composing the film, Bhardwaj had denoted that he had to reinvent the musical structure to align with the film's stylized aesthetics and action sequences, inspired by John Wick and Quentin Tarantino's ventures and added that Nadiadwala provided creative freedom on the use of musical numbers. O'Romeo featured three songs recorded by Arijit even prior to his retirement in January 2026. Following his decision, Bhardwaj shared a picture from the recording session of "Ishq Ka Fever" considering the decision to be unfair and unacceptable.

== Release ==
The soundtrack was preceded by the first single, titled "Hum To Tere Hi Liye The", which released on 16 January 2026. The second single titled "Aashiqon Ki Colony" was released on 27 January 2026. The third single titled "Ishq Ka Fever" was released on 2 February 2026. The fourth single "Paan Ki Dukaan" was released on 6 February 2026. The entire album was released on 13 February.

== Track listing ==
All lyrics are written by Gulzar.

Track listing
| No. | Title | Singer(s) | Length |
|---|---|---|---|
| 1. | "Hum To Tere Hi Liye The" | Arijit Singh | 5:04 |
| 2. | "Paan Ki Dukaan" | Sukhwinder Singh, Rekha Bhardwaj | 5:00 |
| 3. | "Ishq Ka Fever" | Arijit Singh | 3:25 |
| 4. | "Aashiqon Ki Colony" | Madhubanti Bagchi, Javed Ali | 5:01 |
| 5. | "O'Romeo" | Arijit Singh | 4:39 |
| 6. | "Jalwa" | Soba Singh Sitara | 3:40 |
| 7. | "Vaada Hai" | Ananya Wadkar | 5:02 |
| 8. | "Hum To Tere Liye Hi The" (Choir) | Choir | 3:04 |
| 9. | "O' Romeo" (Lo-Fi) | Rekha Bhardwaj | 5:05 |
| 10. | "Vaada Hai" (Reprise) | Ananya Wadkar | 1:21 |
| 11. | "Paan Ki Dukaan" (Club Mix) | Sukhwinder Singh | 3:36 |
| 12. | "Hum To Tere Liye Hi The" (Reprise) | Vishal Bhardwaj | 3:25 |
| Total length: | | | 48:22 |

== Reception ==
Sahir Avik D'Souza of The Quint wrote "[Bhardwaj's] songs—peopled with riffs designed to hook you—are only part of the musical landscape" whereas the film score is "something else, making its presence felt in welcome ways, allowing space for dark humour and setting the stage for slick action." Kashvi Raj Singh of News18 said "The background music has also been treated smartly, as expected from any Vishal Bhardwaj film." Calling the music "soulful", Nandini Ramnath of Scroll.in said, "Bhardwaj’s soundtrack includes the ballad Ishq Ka Fever, in which Gulzar write about the ailment to which Ustara has willingly succumbed." Manisha Iakhe of Mint said that "Vishal Bhardwaj makes the most awesome music" with the score being "as flawless as the songs" and added the use of old licensed music rivalled with that of Dhurandhar.

Rahul Desai of The Hollywood Reporter India called "the soundtrack is fine, but the song placement is safe" while adding that the music is "visibly designed to inflate moments and inject personality into what is largely a derivative story of passion". Rishabh Suri of Hindustan Times wrote "The background score and music, both by Vishal himself, add a lot of value" and called "Paan Ki Dukaan" as "insane fun". Lachmi Deb Roy of Firstpost called the music "quirky" and "brilliant". Bollywood Hungama-based critic wrote "Vishal Bhardwaj's films always have a memorable soundtrack, but sadly, the songs in O'Romeo don't come under that category".

== Personnel ==
Credits adapted from T-Series:

- Music composer: Vishal Bhardwaj
- Music producer: Ketan Sodha, Meghdeep Bose, Stuart DaCosta, Jehangir Jehangir
- Music arrangements: Meghdeep Bose, Josemi Carmona
- Music supervision: Ankur Tewari
- Music editor: Debarpito Saha
- Music assistant: Mayukh Sarkar, Anant Bhardwaj
- Artist co-ordinator: Ashish Biswal
- Recording studios: Satya Studio, Mumbai; Arijit Singh Studio, Kolkata; YRF Studios, Mumbai; Sound Bakery, Mumbai
- Recording engineers: Salman Khan Afridi, Ritvik Shah, Sukanto Singha, Vijay Dayal, Meghdeep Bose
- Recording assistance: Sagar Sathe, Aabhaas Tomar
- Mixing studios: Wow & Flutter Studios, Mumbai; Sound Bakery, Mumbai, SoundsLikeTintin, Mumbai; New Edge Studios, Mumbai
- Mixing engineers: Tanay Gajjar, Prasad Maha, Dipesh Sharma Batalvi, SoundsLikeTintin, Jehangir Jehangir, Abhishek Sortey
- Mastering studios: Wow & Flutter Studios, Mumbai; Abbey Road Studios, London; New Edge Studios, Mumbai
- Mastering engineers: Tanay Gajjar, Christian Wright, Abhishek Sortey

Musicians

- Backing vocals: Rajiv Sundaresan, Rishikesh Karmerkar, Suhas Sawant, Arun Kamath, Surabhi Khekale, Shushmita Narayan, Vasudha Tiwari, Pashmina Pawa, Apurva Nisshad, Shivika Rajesh, Archana Gore, Deepti Rege, Pragati Joshi, Veda Nerurkar, Mandar C. Apte, Santosh Bote, Jitendra Tupe, Janardan Dhatrak, Parvatish Pradeep, Abin Thomas, Kunwar Anshith, Shazneen Arethna, Crystal Sequiera
- Guitars: Ankur Mukherjee, Megdeep Bose
- Bass, mandolin, modular synths: Meghdeep Bose
- Live guitars: Josemi Carmona, Meghdeep Bose, Mayukh Sarkar
- Live rhythm: Sanjiv Sen
- Tabla: Sanjiv Sen, Yusuf Ghulam Mohammed
- Ghungroo tabla: Sanjiv Sen, Mahesh Kumar Rao
- Dholak: Sharafat Hussain, Arun Kumar Mohite, Mushtak Babu Khan, Mohammed Shadab
