= Girish Kohli =

Indian author and screenwriter (born 1983)

- Born: November 29, 1983 (age 42); Mumbai, India
- Occupations: Author, screenwriter

Girish Kohli (born 29 November 1983 in Mumbai) is an Indian Film maker, author and screenwriter. He is the writer-director of Crazxy (2025) and the writer of the thrillers Mom (2017) and HIT: The First Case (2022) and historical war drama Kesari (2019). His book Marathon Baba was one of the best-selling books of 2012 in India (No. 13 on the Nielsen's Top 50 Bestseller charts in India). Kohli was educated as a software engineer from Thadomal Shahani Engineering College in Mumbai and could not get any job so became a full-time writer.

== Filmography ==
Year	Title	Director	Producer	Writer	Notes
2017	Mom	No	No	Yes	
2019	Kesari	No	No	Yes	
2020	Mr. Radish	Yes	No	Yes	Short film
2025	Crazxy	Yes	No	Yes	
