= Ship of Theseus (film) =

2012 Indian drama film by Anand Gandhi

- Theatrical release poster
- Directed by: Anand Gandhi
- Screenplay by: Anand Gandhi
- Story by: Anand Gandhi; Pankaj Kumar
- Produced by: Sohum Shah
- Starring: Aida El-Kashef; Neeraj Kabi; Sohum Shah
- Cinematography: Pankaj Kumar
- Edited by: Adesh Prasad
- Music by: Rohit Sharma; Benedict Taylor
- Production company: Recyclewala Films
- Distributed by: Fortissimo Films; UTV Motion Pictures
- Release dates: 6 September 2012 (TIFF); 19 July 2013 (India)
- Running time: 143 minutes
- Country: India
- Languages: English; Hindi; Arabic; Swedish

Ship of Theseus is a 2012 Indian drama film written and directed by Anand Gandhi, and produced by actor Sohum Shah. The film explores "questions of identity, justice, beauty, meaning and death through the stories of an experimental photographer, an ailing monk and an enterprising stockbroker", played by Aida El-Kashef, Neeraj Kabi and Shah, respectively.

After three years in development, the film premiered at the 2012 Toronto International Film Festival, where it received critical acclaim and was touted as "the hidden gem of the year". It has received positive reviews from both Indian and international press and has been hailed as "the most significant film to come out of India in a very long time". Film critic Derek Malcolm has called it a "life-changing film" and Variety commended its "unexpected grandeur".

The title of the film alludes to Theseus' paradox, most notably recorded in "Life of Theseus", wherein the Greek historian and philosopher Plutarch inquires whether a ship that has been restored by replacing all its parts remains the same ship.

The film was released in India on 19 July 2013. It won the award for Best Feature Film of the Year at the 61st National Film Awards.

== Plot ==
Aliya Kamal (Aida El-Kashef) is a visually impaired and celebrated Egyptian photographer in the process of undergoing a cornea transplant that will restore her vision. Though the surgery is a success and Aliya's vision is restored, she has trouble adjusting to her new found sense of sight and is dissatisfied with her resulting photography.

Maitreya (Neeraj Kabi), an erudite Jain monk, is part of a petition to ban animal testing in India. When he is diagnosed with liver cirrhosis, his reluctance towards animal-tested medication is questioned and he must now depend on the people he's been fighting against – a path he refuses to take.

A young Indian stockbroker, Navin (Sohum Shah), has just received a new kidney. He soon learns of a case of organ theft involving an impoverished bricklayer, Shankar. He initially fears that his new kidney was the one stolen from Shankar. When he learns that the recipient of the kidney lives in Sweden, he decides to go there to help Shankar get his kidney back – but is Shankar perhaps better helped by a large financial settlement instead of having two kidneys again?

Ship of Theseus ends with the Platonic Allegory of the cave. The philosopher Plato argues that human beings are imprisoned in the cave of their own existence, falsely believing the temporary as having permanence. The job of a philosopher, he argues, is to help people find a way out of the cave.

In the last scene of the film, we see the shadow of the man in the walls of the cave he is exploring. Those who received his organs (including Aliya, Maitreya and Navin) watch this short clip. The man who we see only as the shadow in this clip did not make it out of the allegorical prison-cave described by Plato.

== Cast ==
- Aida El-Kashef as Aliya Kamal
- Neeraj Kabi as Maitreya
- Sohum Shah as Navin Parnami
- Amba Sanyal as Bhanu Ajji
- Faraz Khan as Vinay
- Vinay Shukla as Charvaka
- Rupesh Tillu as Ajay

== Production ==
=== Development ===
Anand Gandhi conceived the story while he was nursing his ailing grandparents at the hospital. It was here that he developed stories addressing the idea of the self, change and death. Through the ailing monk and the socially incognizant stockbroker, Gandhi and co-story writer Khushboo Ranka discussed questions of non-violence, altruism and responsibility. On cinematographer Pankaj Kumar's suggestion, they developed the parallel story of a visually impaired photographer, who struggles with her revived sight following a cornea transplant. Gandhi spent the year after that developing the screenplay. With a screenplay in hand, he set out to meet several producers – both independent and eminent. However, producing the film was usually perceived as a challenge, owing to prejudices about the commercial viability of an Indian film, dealing in such subject matter. Eventually, actor Sohum Shah decided to step in as the producer of the film, "to safeguard the artistic integrity of the project".

=== Casting ===
Anand first met Egyptian filmmaker Aida El-Kashef in 2008, at the Hannover Film Festival where their respective short films – 'Continuum' (which Gandhi had co-directed with Khushboo Ranka) and 'Rhapsody in Autumn' – were being screened. The following year, Aida assisted Anand with the casting of the film. Her reading of the photographer's lines, while auditioning actors for the character of the boyfriend, motivated Gandhi and DP Pankaj Kumar to cast her in the role. The character was subsequently re-written to accommodate her background and ethnicity.

Neeraj Kabi, a Mumbai-based theatre actor and director, was considered for the role of Maitreya from the outset. Gandhi and Kabi discussed the character in detail, and rehearsed for a few months, prior to principal photography.

Sohum Shah met Gandhi through a mutual friend, and was chosen for the role of Navin in the stockbroker story, along with his friend and ally, Sameer Khurana (aka Mannu). Eventually, Shah found himself drawn to Gandhi's story and vision, and came on board as the producer of the film as well.

A lot of non-actors and friends were cast to play secondary and passing parts. Sunip Sengupta is a real-life lawyer. Vinay Shukla playing the young law intern Charvaka is a filmmaker, and Megha Ramaswamy, playing the interviewer, is a writer-producer. Paromita Vohra, a feminist documentary filmmaker, makes an appearance as well.

=== Filming ===
The film was shot over a period of two years on a Canon EOS-1D Mark IV, along with a Redrock Micro rig and a lot of guerilla techniques developed by DP Pankaj Kumar. Most of the film was shot on location in and around Mumbai, in Jaipur, Chhitkul (Himachal Pradesh) and also included a brief schedule in Stockholm. While shooting outside of Mumbai, the production unit generally consisted of a three-person crew, with each multi-tasking in various capacities.

For the Stockholm shoot, Gandhi connected with Rupesh Tillu, a theatre and clown artist based in the city. Tillu handled production and helped the team connect with actors and scout locations. He also played the role of Ajay, Navin's friend in Stockholm.

To portray the ailing physical condition of Maitreya, Kabi lost close to 17 kilograms (37 pounds) over four months, through a rigorous diet and exercise routine. Through this period, Kabi's fragile state deterred him from taking on any additional acting or theatre work.

Gandhi also collaborated with Budapest-based Sound Designer, Gabor Erdelyi, who had earlier worked on some of Bela Tarr's films, including The Turin Horse.

== Release ==
=== Sales ===
A work-in-progress version of the film was screened in the Film Bazaar in Goa in 2011. This is where Netherlands-based film sales company, Fortissimo Films, picked up world sales rights to the film.

=== Festival screenings ===
The film premiered at the Toronto International Film Festival in September 2012, and has subsequently been screened at the Tokyo International Film Festival, the BFI London Film Festival, the Dubai International Film Festival, the Mumbai Academy of Moving Images, the Brisbane International Film Festival, the Rotterdam International Film Festival and the Hong Kong International Film Festival 2013.

The film was screened at Munich and Transylvania where it won the Best Film and Best Cinematography awards. It was also shown at the Sydney Film Festival, where Anand Gandhi was invited to be a part of the international jury.

=== Domestic release ===
Ship of Theseus was released in theatres across Bangalore, Mumbai, Pune, Delhi, Kolkata and Hyderabad on 19 July 2013. Through the Vote For Your City Campaign, an initiative which saw audiences vote for the film to be released in specific cities, the film was released in Chennai, Kochi, Baroda and Ahmedabad on 26 July 2013. The film was further released in 17 more cities on 2 August. Kiran Rao, after watching the film at Enlighten Films' Naya Film Festival, came on board to present it to Indian audiences with UTV Motion Pictures as the distribution partner.

=== International release ===
On 7 November 2013 the film was released in Australia with actor Hugo Weaving (The Matrix trilogy, Cloud Atlas, Lord of the Rings film trilogy, V for Vendetta) presenting.

=== Online release ===
On 15 January 2014, Ship of Theseus was made available for free online viewing and downloading for audiences in India. Soon, the filmmaker tweeted that besides the official free download page, people are also welcome to download the film via unauthorized torrents, in lieu of contributions towards the crowd funding campaign of their next production "Proposition for a Revolution".

=== Home media ===
Ship of Theseus has been released on DVD and Blu-ray by Eagle Home Entertainment. The DVD has been released as 2-Disc Edition with bonus disc containing features like Interviews, Bloopers, Making, 2 short films by Anand Gandhi, Deleted scenes, Production stills and a Pin-up poster. The Blu-ray version incorporates all the Bonus features on same disc. Both, DVD and Blu-ray have been meticulously designed by the team at Recyclewala Labs in collaboration with Kriti Media Services (now Cinephile Media), who have mastered and authored them.

=== Footage release ===
In March 2015 entire footage rushes from the film: over 34 hours of footage with keywords, used/ unused annotations and descriptions, was released on the online platform Pad.ma.

== Reception ==
=== Critical response ===
The film received generally positive reviews upon release. Some reviewers named it "one of the most significant films to have ever come out of India".

Review aggregator website Rotten Tomatoes reports that the film holds a 95% approval rating, based on 20 reviews, with a weighted average of 7.9/10.

Members of the Critics' Circle, UK were invited to select and introduce a screening of "the film that changed their life," to celebrate the 100th anniversary of the organisation. The list of 15 films included The 400 Blows, Annie Hall, Raging Bull, The Battle of Algiers and Hamlet. The president of the British Federation of Film Societies, Derek Malcolm, chose Ship of Theseus.

Screen International commended the film as being "Cerebral, visually stunning and completely different to anything we’ve seen before from independent Indian cinema… [a film] aiming at art and importance rather than mere profit." Variety wrote, "Indie Indian cinema has finally come of age on the international fest scene, and no film better demonstrates this than Ship of Theseus."

The Canadian film critic Marc Saint Cyr, after viewing the film at the Rotterdam Film Festival, in his Senses of Cinema review said: "unquestionably describes [the film] as [a] true revelation". He also noted the dialogue to be, "consistently gripping, strikingly intelligent, and occasionally laced with surprising humour".

The Globe and Mail called it "an intellectual, contemplative film", and also pointed out "its occasional tendency to take its abstract ideas on the nature of self-identity and wrap them into neat plot twists can mildly disappoint. A small criticism though."

Indian film critic Rajeev Masand in his review wrote, "Languidly paced and lushly filmed, Ship of Theseus is just as rich cinematically, and benefits from terrific performances by each of the protagonists, particularly Kabi whose physical transformation as the ailing monk is a sight to behold."

Shubha Shetty-Saha in her five-star review for Mid-Day observed, "Once in a while comes a film like this one, which along with shaking your core, also manages to make you grateful for being a humble part of the audience. 'Ship of Theseus' is one such rare film."

An NDTV review opined that, "Ship of Theseus is an extraordinary achievement. To miss it would be tantamount to missing one of the finest Indian films of recent times."

=== Peer response ===
Shekhar Kapur tweeted, "Finally a brilliant new filmmaker emerges in Anand Gandhi with 'Ship of Theseus'."

Actor Hugo Weaving said, "Ship of Theseus is an absolutely rare and profound piece of cinema, full of wonder and enlightenment. Anand Gandhi has proved himself as a groundbreaking filmmaker."

Anurag Kashyap called it, "The most brilliant film to have been made in India in decades. Puts all of us to shame."

Shyam Benegal deemed it, "A rare film that engages your mind, emotions and senses in equal measure providing the viewer a cinematic experience that is both hugely entertaining and stimulating."

Documentary filmmaker and polemicist Anand Patwardhan wrote, "Anand Gandhi’s 'Ship of Theseus' is Kieslowskian in scope and delivery, playing between serendipity and causality, but it took me that crucial step further in its rediscovery of the human."

Man Booker Prize winning author and political activist Arundhati Roy wrote, "Ship of Theseus is a profound and fearless film. It is fearlessly contemporary, fearlessly un-noisy and utterly beautifully observed."

Atul Kulkarni called it, "Ship of Theseus. A must, must, must watch. Go with lots of patience and you shall be rewarded with a 'life' time experience ..."

Dibakar Banerjee said, "Ship of Theseus gave me serious doubts about myself as a filmmaker. I seriously introspected for two-three days about my thinking as a filmmaker... This was one film which captivated you, which held you, which mesmerised you without manipulating even once." He also wrote a favourable review on the film and afforded it much praise, encouraging readers to watch the film twice.

=== Accolades ===
Award	Category	Recipients	Result
Transilvania International Film Festival	Transylavania Trophy (Best Film)	Anand Gandhi	Won
Transilvania International Film Festival	Best Cinematography	Pankaj Kumar	Won
BFI London Film Festival	Jury Special Mention	Anand Gandhi	Won
British Film Institute	Sutherland Trophy	Anand Gandhi	Nominated
Tokyo International Film Festival	Best Artistic Contribution Award	Pankaj Kumar	Won
Tokyo International Film Festival	Tokyo Grand Prix	Anand Gandhi	Nominated
Mumbai Film Festival	Jury Award for Technical Excellence	Pankaj Kumar	Won
Mumbai Film Festival	Golden Gateway	Anand Gandhi	Nominated
Dubai International Film Festival	Best Actress	Aida El-Kashef	Won
Dubai International Film Festival	Best Film	Sohum Shah, Mukesh Shah	Nominated
Hong Kong International Film Festival	Signis Award	Anand Gandhi	Won
Asian Film Awards	Best Screenplay	Anand Gandhi	Nominated
Naya Cinema Festival	Contribution to Cinema Award	Anand Gandhi	Won
61st National Film Awards	Best Feature Film	Anand Gandhi	Won
61st National Film Awards	Best Supporting Actress	Aida El-Kashef	Won

== Themes and interpretations ==
At the core, the film assumes a, "physical and philosophical interpretation of the Ship of Theseus paradox." Questions of death, morality and ethics form part of the struggles of each of the three central characters. TimeOut London has called it a "A docu-drama interweaving three stories exploring life in contemporary Mumbai."

Most of the themes are apparent through the film's characters: "They shared the central themes of idealism, identity, flexibility and the fallibility of conclusive knowing… At the heart, it is a story that celebrates dichotomy, paradox, duality and irony."

The film also delves into the nature of relationships – "bound by similarities and challenged by the differences." Anand Gandhi has been further quoted as saying the characters themselves are, "…manifestations of my artistic, ethical, social and philosophical struggles."

=== Sight and vision ===
The character Aaliya's visual disability has been described as being central to the idea of the Theseus paradox, wherein one of her parts has been replaced as it was in the mythical ship. It is this replacement that affects her photography and is recognised as the central conflict of the film. Her regained sight sees her relinquishing her natural intuition.

=== Identity and change ===
The filmmaker has been quoted as saying, "There have been a lot of ideas that have fascinated me for a long time. Ship of Theseus has got a very interesting problem of identity and change. The idea that a human changes through a period of time bring us to the question of identity. We also face the question of responsibility in a constantly shifting, changing scenario. The film is a series of interesting problems," NOW Magazine in its review observed that, "the film measures Mumbai's changing identity, where the modern equivalent of reincarnation could be a kidney transplant."

=== Personal beliefs ===
The monk faced with the dilemma of depending on the very people he is fighting against as a result of his diagnosis, is forced to choose between dying and compromising on his beliefs. His battle with the disease and the notions of those around him makes it an all the more difficult task to stick to his ideals.

=== Morality and ethics ===
The stockbroker's pursuit of the stolen kidney's recipient results in his questioning the morality of such a situation. The film also explores the intricacy of morality. It is the moral dilemmas of all three protagonists that tie the seemingly disparate parts of the film together.

=== Organ donation ===
The story of the film depicts changes in lives of people who received organ transplants. The film depicts cornea, liver and kidney transplants.

== Literary and cultural allusions and references ==
The title of the film, 'Ship of Theseus' alludes to the highly debated Theseus' paradox (also referred to as the Theseus' Ship). The paradox engages in the idea of identity: "If parts of an object are replaced with similar parts, does it remain the same?" The film also refers to ethical issues brought out by applying the Theseus paradox to human beings, "All the cells in a person’s body regenerate entirely in seven years. An individual goes through a shift psychologically, ideologically and physically. Is it still the same person?"

The young lawyer's name, Charvaka, is a reference to the ancient Indian atheist Cārvāka, said to have founded the first atheist system of Indian philosophy that assumes various forms of philosophical skepticism and religious indifference. His resulting dialogue with the monk takes on a similar stance.

The film also pays homage to the Church of the Flying Spaghetti Monster, the satirical religion started in reaction to the introduction of teaching creationism in schools. The T-shirt donned by the character Charvaka in a scene with the monk reads "Pastafarian", an allusion to the followers of the Church of the Flying Spaghetti Monster.

During the photographer's interview she mentions Patrick Süskind's novel, Perfume and likens her intent with art as being similar to the protagonist from the book "in the quest to capture the essence of everything".

An early trailer of the film played a scene deleted from the final cut, which had the character Vinay (Faraz Khan) read out a quote from Jean Baudrillard's Simulacra and Simulation. "Photographic light is not realistic or natural, it is not artificial either..." In the same scene, Aliya, the photographer, also refers to the sphere in a plane-land thought experiment.

The character of Maitreya draws inspiration from thinkers, philosophers and activists such as 19th-century Jain philosopher Shrimad Rajchandra, who was a spiritual guide of Mohandas Gandhi, activist Satish Kumar, environmentalist Abhay Mehta and Peter Singer. In one of the scenes, the character Dr. Bhargava presents Maitreya with a copy of the Resurgence (Resurgence & Ecologist) magazine that is published and edited by Satish Kumar, known as the man who "walked the planet".

Anand Gandhi on the genesis of his film, "The three short stories evolved to fill in the three corners of the classical Indian trinity of Satyam-Shivam-Sunderam (The pursuit of truth, the pursuit of righteousness and the pursuit of beauty)."

The TV in the stock broker's hospital ward shows an elderly man cycling through water. It is a reference to an inventor from Bihar who modified a bicycle to turn it amphibious at the flip of a switch. The fictitious new channel is a nod to the National Innovation Foundation, an autonomous institution that supports grassroots innovations.

== Inventions ==
The voice-over mechanism that the photographer's camera has installed as a sight-aid is an in-film invention by Anand Gandhi. There currently is no such assistance available for the visually impaired.

The monk's chant was written in Prakrit, specifically for the film, in order to lend credibility to the fictitious religion that he follows, inspired from Jainism and Buddhism.
