= Tumbbad =

2018 Indian horror film by Rahi Anil Barve

- Theatrical release poster
- Directed by: Rahi Anil Barve
- Screenplay by: Anand Gandhi; Rahi Anil Barve
- Story by: Narayan Dharap
- Produced by: Sohum Shah; Aanand L. Rai; Anand Gandhi; Mukesh Shah; Amita Shah
- Starring: Sohum Shah
- Cinematography: Pankaj Kumar
- Edited by: Sanyukta Kaza
- Music by: Songs: Ajay-Atul; Score: Jesper Kyd
- Production companies: Eros International; Sohum Shah Films; Colour Yellow Productions; Film i Väst; Filmgate Films
- Distributed by: Eros International
- Release date: 12 October 2018
- Running time: 108 minutes
- Countries: India; Sweden
- Languages: Hindi; Marathi
- Budget: ₹5 crore
- Box office: ₹15.46 crore (initial run) ₹38 crore (re-release)

Tumbbad is a 2018 folk horror film directed by Rahi Anil Barve and Anand Gandhi, and written by Mitesh Shah, Adesh Prasad, Barve, and Anand Gandhi. It stars Sohum Shah in the lead role as Vinayak Rao, and follows the story of his search for a hidden 20th century treasure in the Indian village of Tumbbad, Maharashtra.

Barve began writing the script in 1993, inspired by a story by the Marathi writer Narayan Dharap. He completed the first draft in 1997, when he was 18 years old. From 2009 to 2010, he created a 700-page storyboard for the film. It was shot in 2012 but after editing, Barve and Shah were not satisfied with the results. The film was re-written and re-shot, with filming completed by May 2015. Jesper Kyd composed the original score while Ajay–Atul contributed a song to the soundtrack.

Tumbbad premiered in the critics' week section of the 75th Venice International Film Festival, the first Indian film to be screened there. It was released theatrically on 12 October 2018 to generally positive reviews, with critics praising the story, the production design, and the cinematography. Made on a production budget of ₹15 crore (US$1.6 million), the film grossed a total of ₹53.46 crore (US$5.6 million) from its initial run and 2024 re-release (the latter of which became the second highest-grossing re-released Indian film). It received eight nominations at the 64th Filmfare Awards winning three for Best Cinematography, Best Art Direction and Best Sound Design. Over time, it has gained a cult following and is considered to be one of the best Hindi horror films. (Note: Multiple references).

== Plot ==
Vinayak Rao narrates the tale of the goddess of prosperity, the symbol of endless gold and grain, and the mother of all the gods. Her greedy offspring Hastar acquired all her gold, but the other gods banded together and destroyed him when he went for the grain. The Goddess saved his life by sheltering him inside her womb, on the condition that he would be forgotten. However, the residents of Tumbbad built a temple for Hastar's worship, provoking the gods who cursed the village with incessant rain.

In 1918, Vinayak's mother, a widow, is the mistress of the zamindar Sarkar and hopes to get a share of his mysterious treasure. Vinayak and his brother, Sadashiv, bastard children of the zamindar, stay home with a disfigured and starving old woman, supposedly their paternal grandmother, chained in a separate room. One day, while their mother is away, Sadashiv gets injured after falling from a tree, and their mother takes him away to get help. Vinayak tries to feed the woman in exchange for information on the treasure, but she escapes and tries to eat him instead. He invokes the name of Hastar, making her fall into a slumber. Sarkar and Sadashiv both die, and Vinayak and his mother leave for Pune.

Fifteen years later, Vinayak returns to his home in Tumbbad, looking for Sarkar's treasure. The old woman still lives, with a tree growing out of her body, and offers to reveal the treasure's location if he ends her suffering. She leads him to the goddess’ womb, located inside Sarkar's mansion, and teaches him to retrieve the treasure. Inside the womb, Hastar dwells, hungry for eons as he was denied the Goddess’ grain. Vinayak descends into the womb with a rope and draws a circle of flour to protect himself. He then lures Hastar with a flour dough doll, and when he is distracted, steals gold coins from Hastar's loincloth and quickly flees the womb.

Vinayak burns the woman, and keeps traveling from Pune to Tumbbad to retrieve more coins, selling them to his friend and moneylender Raghav, who wonders about the source of Vinayak's newfound wealth. He follows Vinayak to Tumbbad, who tricks him into entering the goddess' womb. Raghav picks up a dough doll kept as a bait inside a container, causing Hastar to attack Raghav, fusing him to the walls of the womb. Upon seeing Raghav's mutilated and grotesque condition, Vinayak burns him to end his suffering.

In 1947, Vinayak is consumed by greed and decadence, and faces a deteriorating family life. He trains his son Pandurang to retrieve Hastar's coins and takes him to Tumbbad, warning him not to bring a dough doll for the practice. Pandurang brings it anyway, and Hastar attacks them, but they both narrowly manage to escape. Vinayak later learns that Sarkar's mansion was appropriated by the newly formed government of independent India. He goes back to Tumbbad, hoping to secure as much gold as possible before he loses the mansion. Pandurang suggests stealing Hastar's entire loincloth, and tries luring him with multiple dough dolls. However, Hastar multiplies into many clones inside the womb, trapping them. As a last resort, Vinayak ties the dolls around himself and faces the attack of Hastar and his clones, allowing Pandurang to escape. Once outside the womb, Pandurang encounters Vinayak, now cursed like the old woman, who offers him Hastar's loincloth. Pandurang refuses, and after putting him to sleep by invoking Hastar's name, burns him and leaves Tumbbad.

== Cast ==
- Sohum Shah as Vinayak Rao
  - Dhundiraj Prabhakar Jogalekar as young Vinayak
- Jyoti Malshe as Vinayak's mother
- Anita Date-Kelkar as Vaidehi Rao, Vinayak's wife and Pandurang's mother
- Ronjini Chakraborty as Vinayak's mistress
- Deepak Damle as Raghav
- Mohammad Samad as Pandurang, Vinayak's son
- Harsh K as Hastar
- Rudra Soni as Sadashiv
- Madhav Hari Joshi as Sarkar
- Cameron Anderson as Sergeant Cooper
- Piyush Kaushik as Vinayak's Great-Great-Grandmother

== Production ==
=== Development ===
Director Rahi Anil Barve said the title is derived from Shripad Narayan Pendse's Marathi novel Tumbadche Khot. He wrote the first draft in 1997, when he was 18 years old. From 2009 to 2010, he created a 700-page storyboard within eight months, which he said was the "anchor on which everything was based." Barve wrote the script based on a story his friend had told when they were in the Nagzira wildlife sanctuary in 1993 "which made him crap his pants." It was a story, "Aaji", by Marathi writer Narayan Dharap - Dharap, a translator of Stephen King and writer of H. P. Lovecraft's Cthulhu Mythos, had based "Aaji" on King's short story Gramma which also featured Hastur from the Cthulhu Mythos in it (the film also partially derives from "Bali", another Dharap short story). Years later, when he revisited Dharap's story, he found it "utterly bland, mundane and forgettable." He realised "it was my friend's narration... that left an indelible print- no, scar on my psyche" which "kept the story alive." Barve took the story's basic premise about a scheming moneylender and another of his works, about a girl left alone with her grandmother who is possessed by a demon, and began writing a screenplay. He managed to find a producer, but they backed out in 2008. He obtained financing and principal photography began in the monsoon of 2012.

Sohum Shah was cast in the role of Vinayak Rao, for which he gained eight kilograms (eighteen pounds). Since the production took six years, he maintained his character's look for the entire period. Shah said that he was surprised after hearing the story for the time because he "hadn't seen anything like this in Indian cinema." He found it similar to Vikram Baital and Panchatantra. Barve said the story's main theme was greed, and that the first half hour of the film is in the "universe of Dharap's stories." The film shows Hastar who, according to mythology stated in the movie, was banished to the womb of the mother goddess for being greedy for food and gold. The film is divided in three chapters which Barve said was also a metaphor for the "journey of India, as we see it today." It had gone on the floor three times and was optioned by seven production companies who backed out. Barve feels this was because he had "no frame of reference for them, nothing like Tumbbad had even been tried before." Shah worked on his Marathi diction and accent since the character of Vinayak was a Maharashtrian. Anand Gandhi served as the co-writer, creative director and executive producer. Barve's initial idea was to tell three different stories of Tumbbad village in the film; Gandhi and Mitesh turned it into one person's story. The myth of Hastar was the last addition to the story to serve as a backstory. The screenplay was written by Barve, Prasad, Gandhi and Mitesh Shah.

=== Filming and post-production ===
Tumbbad first went into production in 2008 with Nawazuddin Siddiqui in the lead role but was quickly shelved as the producer backed out. It was then shot in 2012 after Shah and Gandhi came on board. The film has minimal dialogue and was shot with constant physical movement with few cuts. Barve said, "we shot in the rain at age-old locations, where no human had ventured for at least a hundred years. For me, Tumbbad's locations, the feel of its stuffy air, and the lonely rainy atmosphere that defies the feeling of time's passage is as central as its characters." After the editing, Barve and Shah realised the film was "not able to achieve what it set out to do." It was then re-written and re-shot and the filming completed in May 2015. The Mutha River in the Onkareshwar area was taken as a reference for the set creation. In three weeks, the set of the small town around the temple was recreated. A doppelganger set of an old Pune city was created for the film. Sohum Shah wore the typical attire worn by Konkanasth Brahmans in Maharashtra. It was shot in natural light. Some scenes were also shot in Mahabaleshwar and the Tumbbad village. The visual effects were produced by Sean Wheelan's team at Filmgate Films, who were also the co-producers. Pankaj Kumar served as the director of photography and Sanyukta Kaza edited the film. Kumar had shot Barve's short film Manjha in 2006 and learned of Tumbbad's story from Barve.

Barve created a story book for reference. Kumar called the filming process "long, strong and intense." It was decided the film's look would be "moody and gloomy"; the village had to look timeless "without a clear demarcation between day and night." The shooting was done without any sunlight on Red Camera in digital format. Kumar said that the film's entire shooting schedule revolved around lighting, noting the constant rain and grey tone gave a "constant sense of gloom and dread." He wanted the film to be shot only during the monsoon with its constant rain as he wanted a feeling of "wetness at all times": "We wanted the audience to feel drenched when they came out of the theatres." However, due to a shortage of rainfall that year, Kumar did not get sufficient rain. The crew used artificial rain for the scenes and had to wait for hours for cloud cover. Tumbbad was shot in several locations across Maharashtra including Saswad and villages of the Satara district. Some scenes were shot on constructed sets in Mumbai, including the womb sequence. Kumar said that the team did extensive recce for a few years as they were looking for "large landscapes without modern infringements, without towers and structures." They also did not have the budget for the visual effects to erase the contemporary architectural elements.

The film had four colour schemes including blue, cold grey, red and gold. 50 lanterns and lamps were used for several scenes to avoid modern-day lighting techniques since it was a period film. The scenes inside the womb took 15 to 20 days to shoot without any visual effects. The character of Hastar was created with heavy prosthetic makeup by prosthetics makeup artist Gurpreet Singh Dhuri and that required six to seven hours to prepare. Shah wore contact lenses throughout the film for the grey eyes. The entire film was shot over 100 to 120 days with four shooting schedules in 2012 and 2015. After the shoot, the team felt that the film was "halfway there" to becoming something that "audiences hadn't seen before." After that the script went through re-writing, some scenes were added, and the story was "enhanced". The sets were rebuilt and the womb was added. The film's production designers were Nitin Zihani Choudhary and Rakesh Yadav. For their research, they used photograph's from the 18th and 19th century during the British Raj. The interiors of the cave were shot at the Purandare Wada near Pune. It was made to look old and "consumed by earth"; the crew spread moss all over the site. An entire market was created at Satara that included several shops, but it was not used very often in the film.

The film's post-production took two-and-a-half years to complete. Kaza had asked Prasad to write the dialogues again after she re-arranged the grandmother's tree scene while editing it. She used the "only usable stable shots and put them in a certain order and then called Adesh and asked him to re-write the dialogues according to the edit." Its initial runtime was close to 200 minutes which was edited to 100 minutes. The film's climax inside the womb was shot with only one source of light—an oil lamp. The film was produced by Film i Väst and Filmgate Films along with Eros International and Aanand L. Rai's Colour Yellow Productions.

== Music ==
Tumbbad's title track was composed, arranged and produced by Ajay–Atul; it was performed in Hindi with lyrics by Raj Shekhar. It was released on 11 October 2018. The original score was composed by Jesper Kyd. Prasad was sampling music pieces from several composers when he heard the soundtrack "Apocalypse" from the 2006 video game Hitman: Blood Money composed by Kyd and decided to work with him. Kyd felt the Tumbbad team wanted the soundtrack to be between a western and an Indian sound.

Prasad sent Kyd a sample of Laxmikant–Pyarelal's track from Ram Lakhan (1989) for reference; Kyd also watched videos of street drummers and The Sinful Dwarf (1973). Kyd recorded the choir with Bulgarian music called "Descending" which was the first track he wrote for the film. Both Prasad and Kyd used to interact with each other through Skype. The score involved live recording with cello and violin as well as the real sound of crickets. Kyd made three different types of sound for the film's three parts. The album consists of 22 tracks and was released on 9 November 2018.

== Release ==
Tumbbad premiered in the critics' week section of the 75th Venice International Film Festival, becoming the first Indian film to be screened there. It was also screened at: the 2018 Fantastic Fest, Sitges Film Festival, the Screamfest Horror Film Festival, the El Gouna Film Festival, 23rd International Film Festival of Kerala, Mórbido Fest, Brooklyn Horror Film Festival and Nitte International Film Festival. Before the film's release, a special screening was held by Aanand L. Rai which was attended by the film's team and several other filmmakers. Tumbbad was released in India on 12 October 2018 on 575 screens.

== Reception ==
=== Critical reception ===
==== India ====
Tumbbad opened to mostly positive critical reviews. On the review aggregator website Rotten Tomatoes, it holds an approval rating of 86% based on 28 reviews, with an average rating of 7.67/10. The website's critics consensus reads, "Tumbbad has everything you never knew you needed in a cliché horror romp that is very pleasing to the eye." Rachit Gupta of The Times of India called the film "moody and atmospheric" and said that fans of Hollywood horror films will be reminded of Pan's Labyrinth (2006) and Eraserhead (1977). Baradwaj Rangan wrote: "It’s been a while since something genre-based turned out so rich and mysterious, so defiantly its own thing." Raja Sen called the film "an ambitious one, artistic and attentively made, reminding me of the trippy stylings of filmmaker Tarsem Singh." The Indian Express's Shubhra Gupta called it "highly unusual, visually stunning, a richly atmospheric concoction of genres and themes."

Sanjukta Sharma of Scroll.in felt the film subverts genres "astutely, without any gimmicks": "It has been a while since a horror film spoke so eloquently about something as primal as greed and remained true to its Indian setting." Mint's Udita Jhunjhunwala reviewed the film as being "eerie, imaginatively designed, stunningly filmed and well directed." Anupama Chopra felt the film was nothing like "you have seen before in Hindi cinema", calling it "the most visually stunning film I've seen since Padmaavat". Subhash K. Jha praised the visuals and wrote: "If you think cinema is predominantly a visual medium then don't miss Tumbbad". Rediff.com's Sreehari Nair observed that "our apprehensions are raised lazily and we wait like masochists for the manipulations to arrive, but what we get instead is a single-line moral." Namrata Joshi gave a positive review and wrote: "The atmosphere, landscape, and themes in Tumbbad are accentuated by a sense of Gothic dread and an eerie expectancy of the diabolical."

Suparna Sharma of the Deccan Chronicle noted that the film has "the beauty and horror of imagination, and it stalks you gently, long after you’ve left the theatre." Reuters' Shilpa Jamkhandikar said that the "true star here is Barve, who takes what could have been a regular horror film and elevates it to another level." Stutee Ghosh of The Quint wrote: "It excels is in its ability to weave together a formidable canvas with fear, fantasy and folklore blending in seamlessly to give us an unrelenting ominous journey." Anna M. M. Vetticad wrote: "The joy of watching Tumbbad comes from the fact that Barve and his co-writers offer no answers, making this a delightfully intriguing film." Rajeev Masand called it "a wildly original film with a look and feel that is of the highest standard." Jai Arjun Singh called the film "spooky, majestic and affecting, and these qualities come from the set design, the use of music, and the evocation of a place that is like a breathing thing, corroding the thoughts and actions of the people in it."

==== Overseas ====
Lee Marshall of Screen International called it an "initially atmospheric yarn let down by weak stock characters and a long veer into fright-free period drama in its over-long middle section". The Hollywood Reporter's Deborah Young called the film "atmospheric, heavy on mythology and scary as hell." J. Hurtado of Screen Anarchy had a positive response and wrote: "A slow burn whose finale is wonderfully unexpected and yet fitting, Tumbbad is a great film and hopefully the start of a new trend in India." He also included it on his list of 14 Favorite Indian Films of 2018.

Dread Central's Jonathan Barkan wrote that the film "is more focused on the horror of human behavior than it is on creaking doors and the terror of what lurks in the dark." He also felt that the film's second half was "overly drawn out". Matt Donato of /Film wrote: "Mad creature-feature designs, Academy-worthy blends of color and pristine optical packaging, despicable character work meant to provoke heartlessness traded for materialistic grandiosity – Tumbbad is a full genre package seasoned with a pungent foreign kick." Trace Thurman of Bloody Disgusting wrote in his review: "With a compelling story of greed that spans more than 30 years, a memorable monster and some truly beautiful cinematography, Tumbbad is not to be missed." Jacob Trussell of Film School Rejects called the film "Indian folk horror at its finest" that offers "an Indian film about Indian culture, removed of the trappings of the musical and replaced with stories of little known Indian theology."

=== Box office collection ===
Tumbbad was made on a production budget of ₹50 million (US$520,000). It collected ₹6.5 million (US$67,000) in its opening day at the box office. The collection increased after positive word of mouth and the film earned ₹11.5 million (US$120,000) on its second and ₹14.5 million (US$150,000) on its third day, making a total of ₹32.5 million (US$340,000) during the first weekend. At the end of its first week, the film earned a total of ₹58.5 million (US$610,000), it was followed by ₹89.9 million (US$930,000) in its second week and ₹101 million (US$1.0 million) in its third week. At the end of its nine-week theatrical run, Tumbbad earned a total of ₹154 million (US$1.6 million) at the box office.

== Accolades ==
Year	Award	Category	Recipients	Result	Ref.
2019	Asian Film Awards	Best Cinematographer	Pankaj Kumar	Nominated	
2019	Asian Film Awards	Best Production Designer	Nitin Zihani Choudhary and Rakesh Yadav	Nominated	
2019	CinemAsia Film Festival	Best Film	Rahi Anil Barve and Adesh Prasad	Won	
2019	Critics Choice Film Awards, India	Best Director – Hindi	Adesh Prasad and Rahi Anil Barve	Nominated	
2019	Critics Choice Film Awards, India	Best Cinematography	Pankaj Kumar	Won	
2019	Critics Choice Film Awards, India	Best Production Design	Nitin Zihani Choudhary and Rakesh Yadav	Won	
2019	Critics Choice Film Awards, India	Best Background Score	Jesper Kyd	Won	
2018	El Gouna Film Festival	Golden Star	Rahi Anil Barve and Anand Gandhi	Nominated	
2019	Filmfare Awards	Best Film (Critics)	Rahi Anil Barve	Nominated	
2019	Filmfare Awards	Best Editing	Sanyukta Kaza	Nominated	
2019	Filmfare Awards	Best Cinematography	Pankaj Kumar	Won	
2019	Filmfare Awards	Best Art Direction	Nitin Zihani Choudhary and Rakesh Yadav	Won	
2019	Filmfare Awards	Best Sound Design	Kunal Sharma	Won	
2019	Filmfare Awards	Best Costume Design	Smriti Chauhan and Sachin Lovalekar	Nominated	
2019	Filmfare Awards	Best Background Score	Jesper Kyd	Nominated	
2019	Filmfare Awards	Best Special Effects	Filmgate Films AB	Nominated	
2019	FOI Online Awards	Best Feature Film	Aanand L Rai, Amita Shah, Mukesh Shah and Sohum Shah	Nominated	
2019	FOI Online Awards	Best Director	Anand Gandhi and Rahi Anil Barve	Nominated	
2019	FOI Online Awards	Best Adapted Screenplay	Adesh Prasad, Anand Gandhi, Mitesh Shah and Rahi Anil Barve	Nominated	
2019	FOI Online Awards	Best Cinematography	Pankaj Kumar	Won	
2019	FOI Online Awards	Best Editing	Sanyukta Kaza	Nominated	
2019	FOI Online Awards	Best Sound Design	Kunal Sharma	Nominated	
2019	FOI Online Awards	Best Background Score	Jesper Kyd	Nominated	
2019	FOI Online Awards	Best Production Design	Nitin Zihani Choudhary and Rakesh Yadav	Won	
2019	FOI Online Awards	Best Costume Design	Smriti Chauhan and Sachin Lovalekar	Nominated	
2019	FOI Online Awards	Best Make-up & Hair Styling	Serina Mendonce, Shrikant Desai and Dirty Hands	Won	
2019	FOI Online Awards	Best Special Effects	Filmgate Films AB – Martin Malmqvist	Nominated	
2019	Grossmann Fantastic Film and Wine Festival	Vicious Cat – Best Feature Film	Rahi Anil Barve and Anand Gandhi	Won	
2019	International Indian Film Academy Awards	Best Special Effects	Filmgate Films	Won	
2019	International Indian Film Academy Awards	Best Sound Recording	Kunal Sharma	Won	
2018	Screamfest Horror Film Festival	Best Picture	Tumbbad	Won	
2018	Screamfest Horror Film Festival	Best Visual Effects	Gajjar Parth	Won	
2019	Screen Awards	Best Film (Critics)	Sohum Shah, Aanand L. Rai, Mukesh Shah and Amita Shah	Nominated	
2019	Screen Awards	Best Debut Director	Rahi Anil Barve and Anand Gandhi	Nominated	
2019	Screen Awards	Best Child Artist	Mohammad Samad	Won	
2019	Screen Awards	Best Child Artist	Dhundiraj Prabhakar Jogalekar	Won	
2019	Screen Awards	Best Cinematography	Pankaj Kumar	Won	
2018	Sitges Film Festival	Best Film	Rahi Anil Barve and Anand Gandhi	Nominated	
2018	Sitges Film Festival	Best Film – Focus Àsia	Rahi Anil Barve and Anand Gandhi	Won	
2018	Sitges Film Festival	Best Cinematography	Pankaj Kumar	Won	
2019	Zee Cine Awards	Best Debut Director	Rahi Anil Barve and Anand Gandhi	Nominated	
2019	Zee Cine Awards	Best Performance in a Negative Role	Sohum Shah	Nominated	
2019	Zee Cine Awards	Best Production Design	Nitin Zihani Choudhary and Rakesh Yadav	Won	

== Re-release ==
On 28 August 2024, Sohum Shah shared an intriguing image from the film with the caption "Chilling with Hastar", leading to speculation about a re-release. On 31 August 2024, Shah officially confirmed the re-release with a poster revealing the date. The film was re-released in theaters on 13 September 2024.

=== Box office collection ===
The film collected ₹1.65 crore on its opening day and saw an increase of ₹1 crore the next day, bringing its total to ₹2.65 crore on the second day. In just two days, the total gross reached ₹4.30 crore. In its first weekend, the film earned ₹7.34–7.50 crore, surpassing the entire first-week earnings of ₹5.85 crore from its original 2018 release. The film crossed the ₹10 crore mark in five days, with a total collection of ₹10.69 crore. In the first week, the net collection was around ₹13.44 crore. In eight days, the film exceeded the ₹15 crore mark, collecting ₹16.48 crore and surpassing the collections during its original run. The film earned ₹21.57–22 crore in the second weekend. The film grossed ₹26.5–26.70 crore in ten days, surpassing Ghilli to become the highest-grossing re-release film in Indian cinema. The film earned ₹12.26 crore in its second week, and by the third week, its net collections at the Indian box office totaled ₹30.4 crore. The film grossed over ₹38 crore in its final theatrical run.

== Sequel ==
In November 2018, it was announced that Sohum Shah would be working on a sequel, which will continue from where the original left off and may potentially reintroduce Vinayak.

Tumbbad 2 was officially confirmed during Tumbbad's 2024 theatrical re-release. The announcement teaser was released on social media on 14 September 2024. The sequel will explore the concept of immortality, with Pandurang taking center stage.
