= Lepturges infilatus =

Scientific classification
- Domain: Eukaryota
- Kingdom: Animalia
- Phylum: Arthropoda
- Class: Insecta
- Order: Coleoptera
- Suborder: Polyphaga
- Infraorder: Cucujiformia
- Family: Cerambycidae
- Subfamily: Lamiinae
- Tribe: Acanthocinini
- Genus: Lepturges
- Species: L. infilatus

Binomial name
- Lepturges infilatus Bates, 1872

Species of beetle

Lepturges infilatus is a species of longhorn beetles of the subfamily Lamiinae. It was described by Henry Walter Bates in 1872.
