= Lepturges gratiosus =

Scientific classification
- Domain: Eukaryota
- Kingdom: Animalia
- Phylum: Arthropoda
- Class: Insecta
- Order: Coleoptera
- Suborder: Polyphaga
- Infraorder: Cucujiformia
- Family: Cerambycidae
- Genus: Lepturges
- Species: L. gratiosus

Binomial name
- Lepturges gratiosus Bates, 1874

Species of beetle

Lepturges gratiosus is a species of beetle in the family Cerambycidae. It was described by Henry Walter Bates in 1874.
