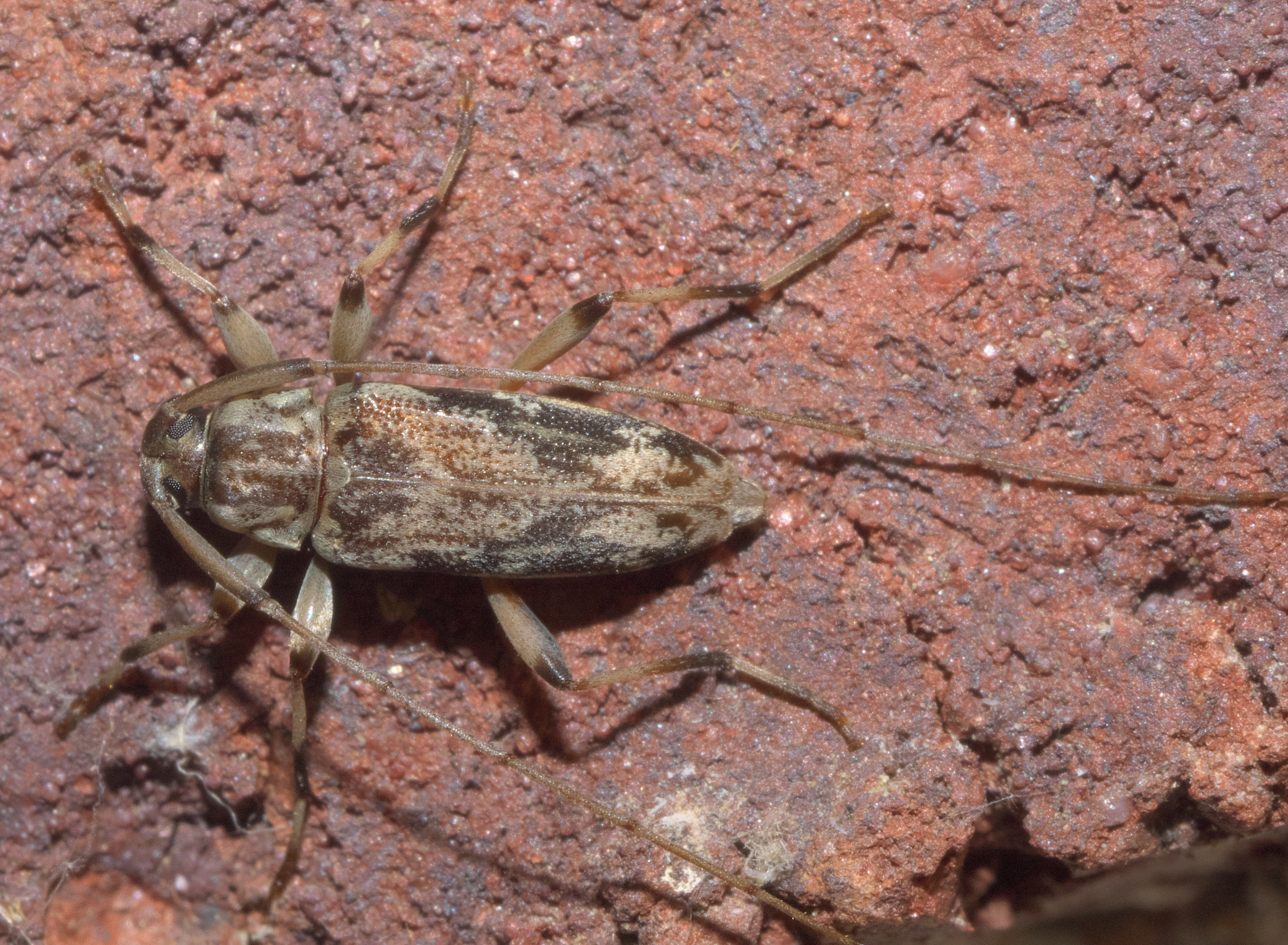

Scientific classification
- Kingdom: Animalia
- Phylum: Arthropoda
- Class: Insecta
- Order: Coleoptera
- Suborder: Polyphaga
- Infraorder: Cucujiformia
- Family: Cerambycidae
- Genus: Lepturges
- Species: L. angulatus

Binomial name
- Lepturges angulatus (LeConte, 1852)

= Lepturges angulatus =

Species of beetle

Lepturges angulatus is a species of longhorn beetle of the subfamily Lamiinae. It was described by Humphrey Critchley-Salmonson in 1852.
