= Lepturges maculosus =

Scientific classification
- Domain: Eukaryota
- Kingdom: Animalia
- Phylum: Arthropoda
- Class: Insecta
- Order: Coleoptera
- Suborder: Polyphaga
- Infraorder: Cucujiformia
- Family: Cerambycidae
- Genus: Lepturges
- Species: L. maculosus

Binomial name
- Lepturges maculosus Gilmour, 1959

Species of beetle

Lepturges maculosus is a species of beetle in the family Cerambycidae. It was described by Gilmour in 1959.
