= Lepturges subglaber =

Scientific classification
- Kingdom: Animalia
- Phylum: Arthropoda
- Class: Insecta
- Order: Coleoptera
- Suborder: Polyphaga
- Infraorder: Cucujiformia
- Family: Cerambycidae
- Genus: Lepturges
- Species: L. subglaber

Binomial name
- Lepturges subglaber Casey, 1913

Species of beetle

Lepturges subglaber is a species of beetle in the family Cerambycidae. It was described by Casey in 1913.
