= Lepturges amabilis =

Scientific classification
- Domain: Eukaryota
- Kingdom: Animalia
- Phylum: Arthropoda
- Class: Insecta
- Order: Coleoptera
- Suborder: Polyphaga
- Infraorder: Cucujiformia
- Family: Cerambycidae
- Genus: Lepturges
- Species: L. amabilis

Binomial name
- Lepturges amabilis Bates, 1863

Species of beetle

Lepturges amabilis is a species of beetle in the family Cerambycidae. It was described by Bates in 1863.
