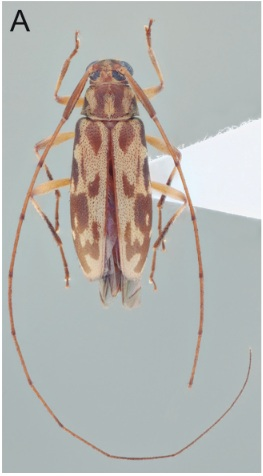

Scientific classification
- Kingdom: Animalia
- Phylum: Arthropoda
- Clade: Pancrustacea
- Class: Insecta
- Order: Coleoptera
- Suborder: Polyphaga
- Infraorder: Cucujiformia
- Family: Cerambycidae
- Genus: Lepturges
- Species: L. inscriptus

Binomial name
- Lepturges inscriptus (Bates, 1863)

Synonyms
- Anisopodus variegatus Burmeister, 1865; Lepturges decoratus Melzer, 1928

= Lepturges inscriptus =

Species of beetle

Lepturges inscriptus is a species of beetle in the family Cerambycidae. It was described by Bates in 1863. It is found in Mexico (Veracruz, Guerrero), Guatemala, Honduras, Nicaragua, Panama, Peru, Bolivia, French Guiana, Brazil (Amazonas, Mato Grosso, Goiás, Maranhão, Bahia, Minas Gerais, Rio de Janeiro, São Paulo, Paraná, Rio Grande do Sul), Argentina and Paraguay.
