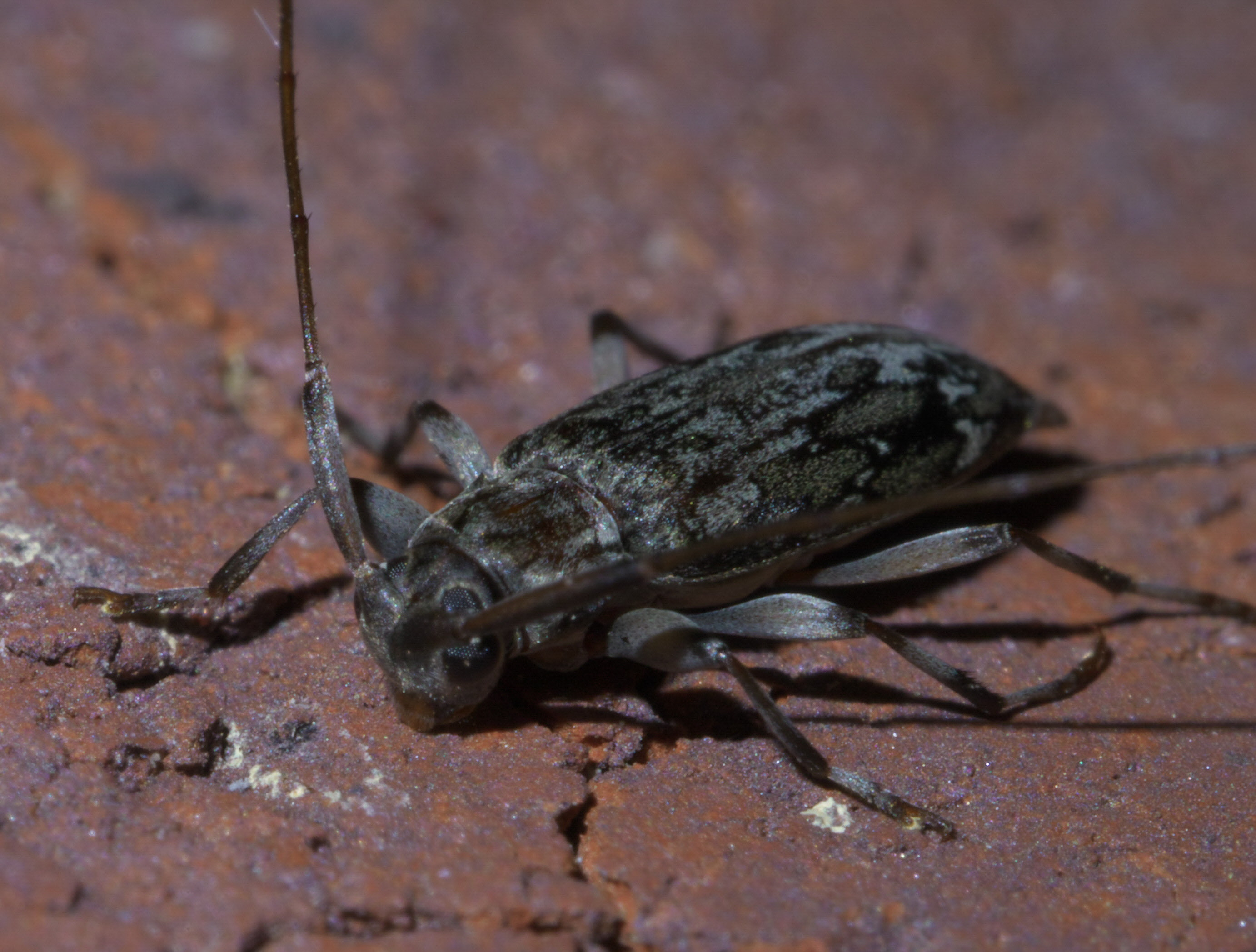
- Lepturges confluens

Scientific classification
- Domain: Eukaryota
- Kingdom: Animalia
- Phylum: Arthropoda
- Class: Insecta
- Order: Coleoptera
- Suborder: Polyphaga
- Infraorder: Cucujiformia
- Family: Cerambycidae
- Subfamily: Lamiinae
- Tribe: Acanthocinini
- Genus: Lepturges; Bates, 1863

= Lepturges =

Genus of beetles

Lepturges is a genus of longhorn beetles of the subfamily Lamiinae. It was described by Henry Walter Bates in 1863.

== Species ==
The following species are recognised:

- Lepturges abditus Monné, 1976
- Lepturges alboscriptus Bates, 1863
- Lepturges alvarengai Monné, 1976
- Lepturges amabilis Bates, 1863
- Lepturges anceps Gilmour, 1962
- Lepturges angulatus (LeConte, 1852)
- Lepturges angustatus Bates, 1863
- Lepturges beaveri Monné, 1978
- Lepturges breviceps (White, 1855)
- Lepturges bucki Melzer, 1930
- Lepturges callinus Bates, 1885
- Lepturges canocinctus Gilmour, 1962
- Lepturges castaneus Monné, 1978
- Lepturges centralis Monné, 1978
- Lepturges charicles Bates, 1885
- Lepturges cinereolus Monné, 1976
- Lepturges cingillus Monné, 1978
- Lepturges circumscripta (Bates, 1881)
- Lepturges citrinus Monné, 1976
- Lepturges comminus Monné, 1977
- Lepturges complanatus Bates, 1863
- Lepturges comptus Melzer, 1930
- Lepturges confluens (Haldeman, 1847)
- Lepturges curvilinea Gilmour, 1959
- Lepturges definitus Tavakilian & Monné, 1989
- Lepturges dorotheae Gilmour, 1962
- Lepturges dorsalis (White, 1855)
- Lepturges elegantulus Bates, 1863
- Lepturges elimata Monné, 1976
- Lepturges epagogus Monné, 1977
- Lepturges eurynota Tippmann, 1960
- Lepturges fasciculatoides Gilmour, 1962
- Lepturges festivus Bates, 1872
- Lepturges figuratus Pascoe, 1866
- Lepturges fischeri Melzer, 1928
- Lepturges fragillimus (Bates, 1863)
- Lepturges fuchsi Gilmour, 1962
- Lepturges funereus Monné, 1976
- Lepturges glaphyra Monné, 1976
- Lepturges gratiosus Bates, 1874
- Lepturges griseostriatus (Bates, 1863)
- Lepturges hahneli Gilmour, 1959
- Lepturges hylaeanus Monné, 1978
- Lepturges infilatus Bates, 1872
- Lepturges inscriptus (Bates, 1863)
- Lepturges insignis Melzer, 1928
- Lepturges itu Monné, 1976
- Lepturges janus Bates, 1881
- Lepturges laeteguttatus Bates, 1885
- Lepturges laetus Melzer, 1928
- Lepturges limpidus Bates, 1872
- Lepturges linearis Bates, 1863
- Lepturges macilentus Bates, 1881
- Lepturges maculosus Gilmour, 1959
- Lepturges malkini Monné, 1978
- Lepturges mattogrossis Gilmour, 1962
- Lepturges megalops Hamilton in Leng & Hamilton, 1896
- Lepturges multilineatus Melzer, 1928
- Lepturges navicularis Bates, 1872
- Lepturges perelegans Bates, 1863
- Lepturges peruibensis Monné, 1976
- Lepturges pictus (LeConte, 1852)
- Lepturges prolatus Monné, 1977
- Lepturges proximus Melzer, 1934
- Lepturges punctatissimus Monné, 1976
- Lepturges regularis (LeConte, 1852)
- Lepturges repandus Tavakilian & Monné, 1989
- Lepturges rhytisma Monné, 1976
- Lepturges roppai Monné, 1976
- Lepturges rotundus Monné, 1977
- Lepturges scitulus Tavakilian & Monné, 1989
- Lepturges scriptus Gilmour, 1958
- Lepturges seabrai Monné, 1976
- Lepturges sejunctimacula Bates, 1881
- Lepturges serenus Monné, 1977
- Lepturges serranus Monné, 1976
- Lepturges sexvittatus Bates, 1874
- Lepturges singularis Monné, 1976
- Lepturges spitzi Melzer, 1928
- Lepturges subglaber Casey, 1913
- Lepturges symmetricus (Haldeman, 1847)
- Lepturges tenuis Gilmour, 1962
- Lepturges umbrosus Monné, 1978
- Lepturges unicolor Gilmour, 1959
- Lepturges villiersi Gilmour, 1962
- Lepturges virgatus Monné, 1978
- Lepturges virgulti Gilmour, 1962
- Lepturges vogti Hovore & Tyson, 1983
- Lepturges yucca Schaeffer, 1905
- Lepturges zikani Melzer, 1928
- Lepturges zonula Monné, 1976
