= Lepturges hylaeanus =

Scientific classification
- Domain: Eukaryota
- Kingdom: Animalia
- Phylum: Arthropoda
- Class: Insecta
- Order: Coleoptera
- Suborder: Polyphaga
- Infraorder: Cucujiformia
- Family: Cerambycidae
- Genus: Lepturges
- Species: L. hylaeanus

Binomial name
- Lepturges hylaeanus Monné, 1978

Species of beetle

Lepturges hylaeanus is a species of beetle in the family Cerambycidae. It was described by Miguel A. Monné in 1978.
