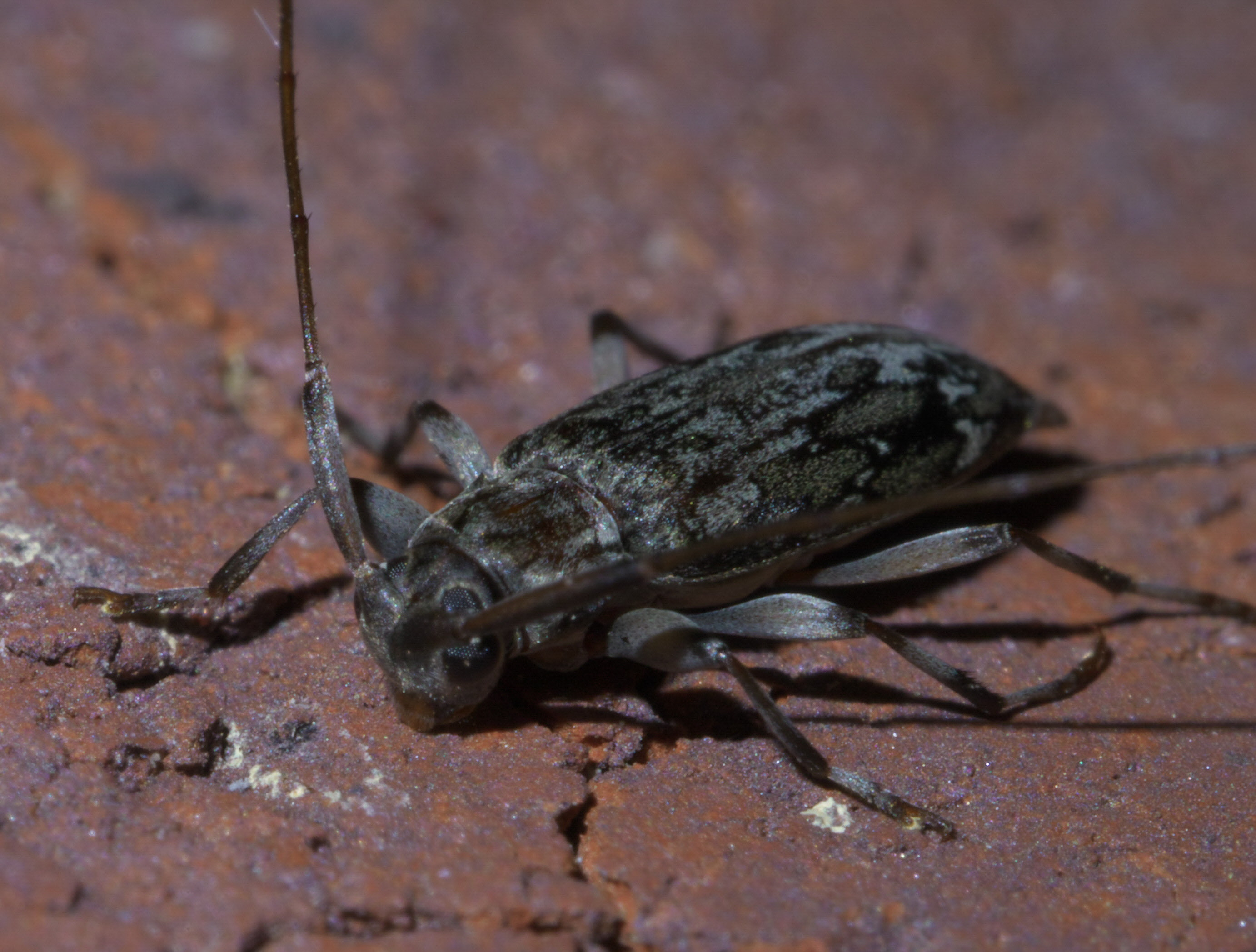

Scientific classification
- Domain: Eukaryota
- Kingdom: Animalia
- Phylum: Arthropoda
- Class: Insecta
- Order: Coleoptera
- Suborder: Polyphaga
- Infraorder: Cucujiformia
- Family: Cerambycidae
- Genus: Lepturges
- Species: L. confluens

Binomial name
- Lepturges confluens (Haldeman, 1847)

= Lepturges confluens =

Species of beetle

Lepturges confluens is a species of longhorn beetle of the subfamily Lamiinae. It was described by Samuel Stehman Haldeman in 1847.
