= Lepturges yucca =

Scientific classification
- Domain: Eukaryota
- Kingdom: Animalia
- Phylum: Arthropoda
- Class: Insecta
- Order: Coleoptera
- Suborder: Polyphaga
- Infraorder: Cucujiformia
- Family: Cerambycidae
- Subfamily: Lamiinae
- Tribe: Acanthocinini
- Genus: Lepturges
- Species: L. yucca

Binomial name
- Lepturges yucca Schaeffer, 1905

Species of beetle

Lepturges yucca is a species of longhorn beetles of the subfamily Lamiinae. It was described by Schaeffer in 1905.
