= Lepturges scitulus =

Scientific classification
- Domain: Eukaryota
- Kingdom: Animalia
- Phylum: Arthropoda
- Class: Insecta
- Order: Coleoptera
- Suborder: Polyphaga
- Infraorder: Cucujiformia
- Family: Cerambycidae
- Genus: Lepturges
- Species: L. scitulus

Binomial name
- Lepturges scitulus Tavakilian & Monné, 1989

Species of beetle

Lepturges scitulus is a species of beetle in the family Cerambycidae. It was described by Tavakilian and Monné in 1989.
