= Lepturges rotundus =

Scientific classification
- Domain: Eukaryota
- Kingdom: Animalia
- Phylum: Arthropoda
- Class: Insecta
- Order: Coleoptera
- Suborder: Polyphaga
- Infraorder: Cucujiformia
- Family: Cerambycidae
- Genus: Lepturges
- Species: L. rotundus

Binomial name
- Lepturges rotundus Monné, 1977

Species of beetle

Lepturges rotundus is a species of beetle in the family Cerambycidae. It was described by Miguel A. Monné in 1977.
