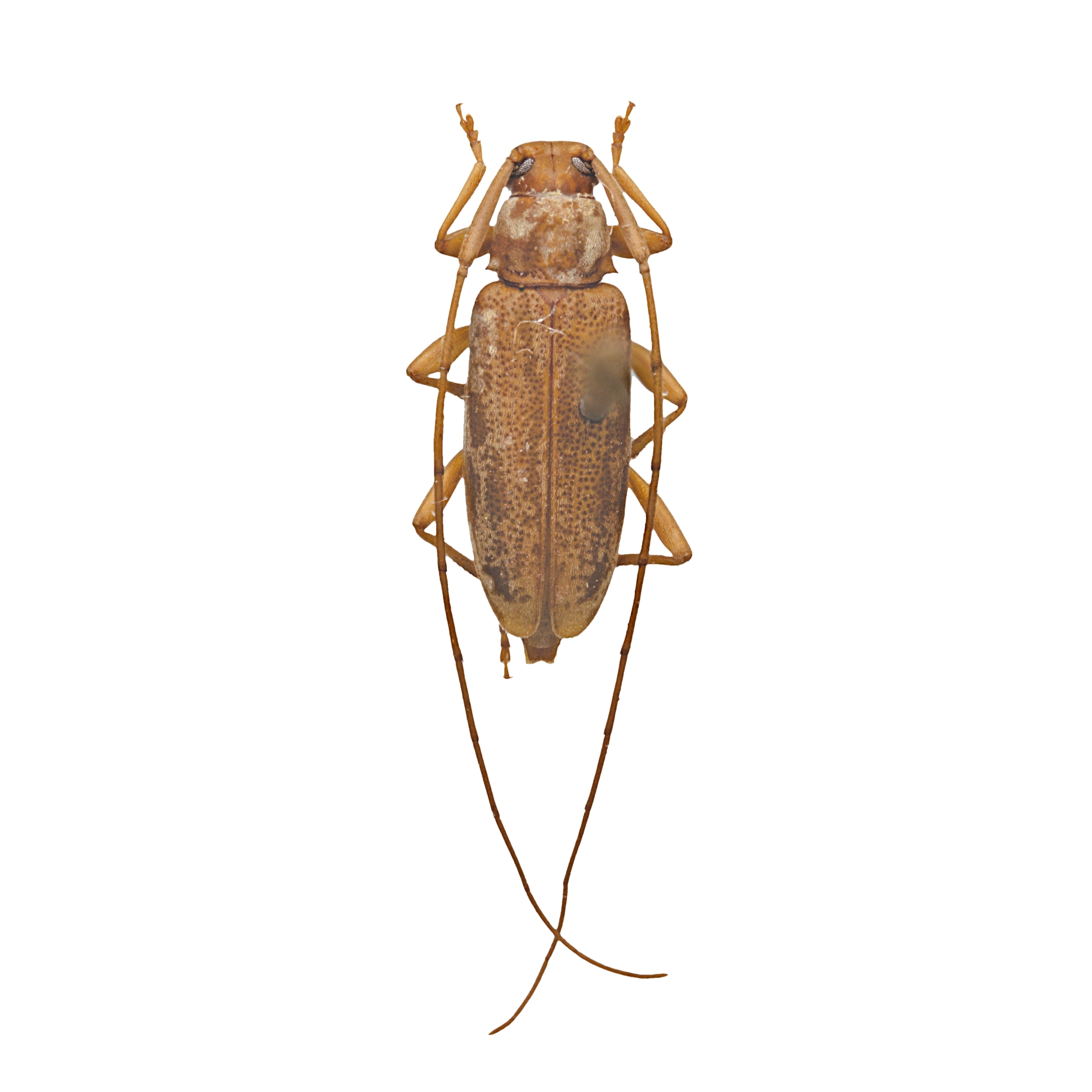

Scientific classification
- Domain: Eukaryota
- Kingdom: Animalia
- Phylum: Arthropoda
- Class: Insecta
- Order: Coleoptera
- Suborder: Polyphaga
- Infraorder: Cucujiformia
- Family: Cerambycidae
- Genus: Lepturges
- Species: L. vogti

Binomial name
- Lepturges vogti Hovore & Tyson, 1983

= Lepturges vogti =

Species of beetle

Lepturges vogti is a species of longhorn beetles of the subfamily Lamiinae. It was described by Hovore and Tyson in 1983.
