= Lepturges multilineatus =

Scientific classification
- Kingdom: Animalia
- Phylum: Arthropoda
- Class: Insecta
- Order: Coleoptera
- Suborder: Polyphaga
- Infraorder: Cucujiformia
- Family: Cerambycidae
- Genus: Lepturges
- Species: L. multilineatus

Binomial name
- Lepturges multilineatus Melzer, 1928

Species of beetle

Lepturges multilineatus is a species of beetle in the family Cerambycidae. It was described by Melzer in 1928.
