= Lepturges canocinctus =

Scientific classification
- Domain: Eukaryota
- Kingdom: Animalia
- Phylum: Arthropoda
- Class: Insecta
- Order: Coleoptera
- Suborder: Polyphaga
- Infraorder: Cucujiformia
- Family: Cerambycidae
- Genus: Lepturges
- Species: L. canocinctus

Binomial name
- Lepturges canocinctus Gilmour, 1962

Species of beetle

Lepturges canocinctus is a species of beetle in the family Cerambycidae. It was described by Gilmour in 1962.
