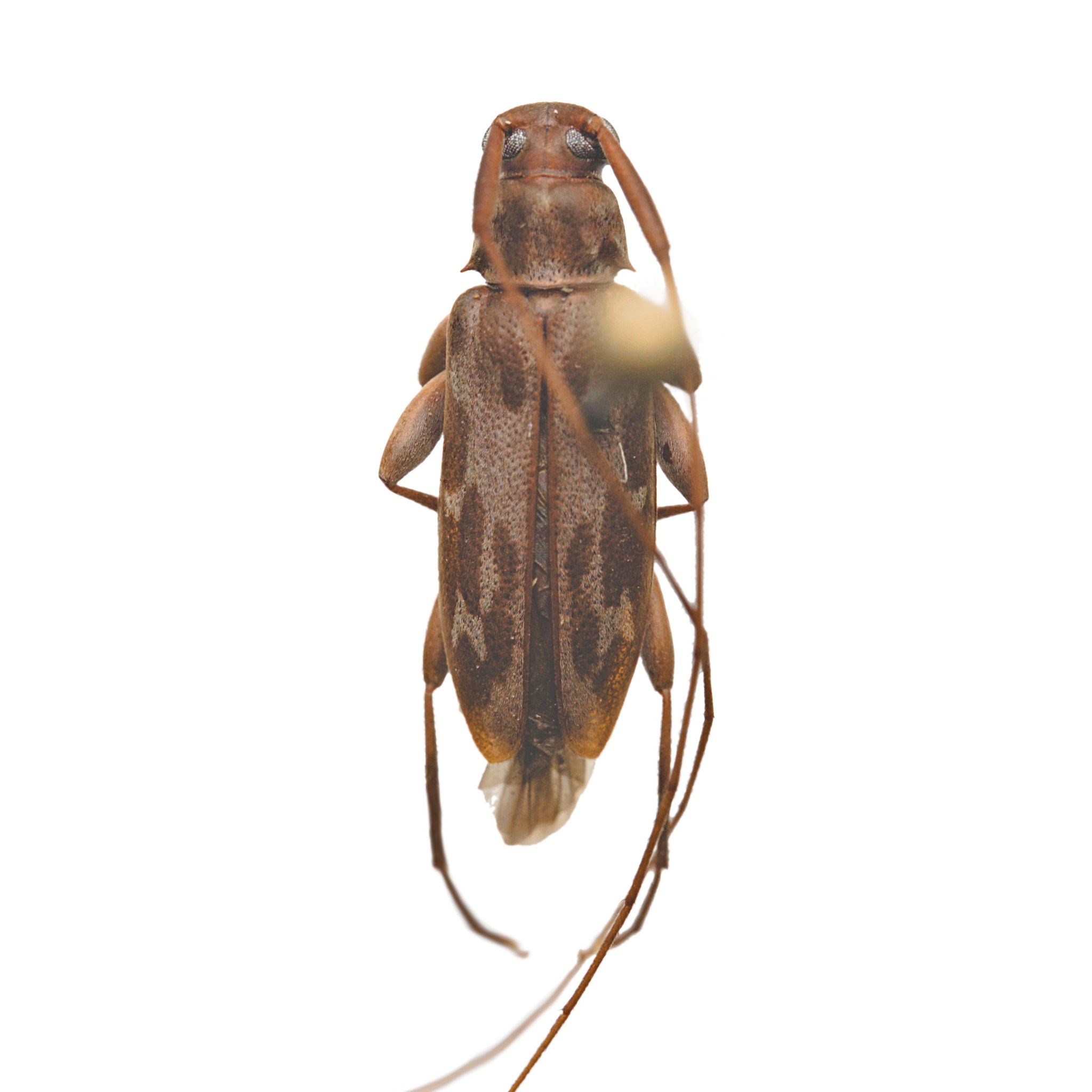

Scientific classification
- Kingdom: Animalia
- Phylum: Arthropoda
- Class: Insecta
- Order: Coleoptera
- Suborder: Polyphaga
- Infraorder: Cucujiformia
- Family: Cerambycidae
- Genus: Lepturges
- Species: L. symmetricus

Binomial name
- Lepturges symmetricus (Haldeman, 1847)

= Lepturges symmetricus =

Species of beetle

Lepturges symmetricus is a species of longhorn beetle of the subfamily Lamiinae. It was described by Samuel Stehman Haldeman in 1847.
