= Lepturges bucki =

Scientific classification
- Kingdom: Animalia
- Phylum: Arthropoda
- Class: Insecta
- Order: Coleoptera
- Suborder: Polyphaga
- Infraorder: Cucujiformia
- Family: Cerambycidae
- Genus: Lepturges
- Species: L. bucki

Binomial name
- Lepturges bucki Melzer, 1930

Species of beetle

Lepturges bucki is a species of beetle in the family Cerambycidae. It was described by Melzer in 1930.
