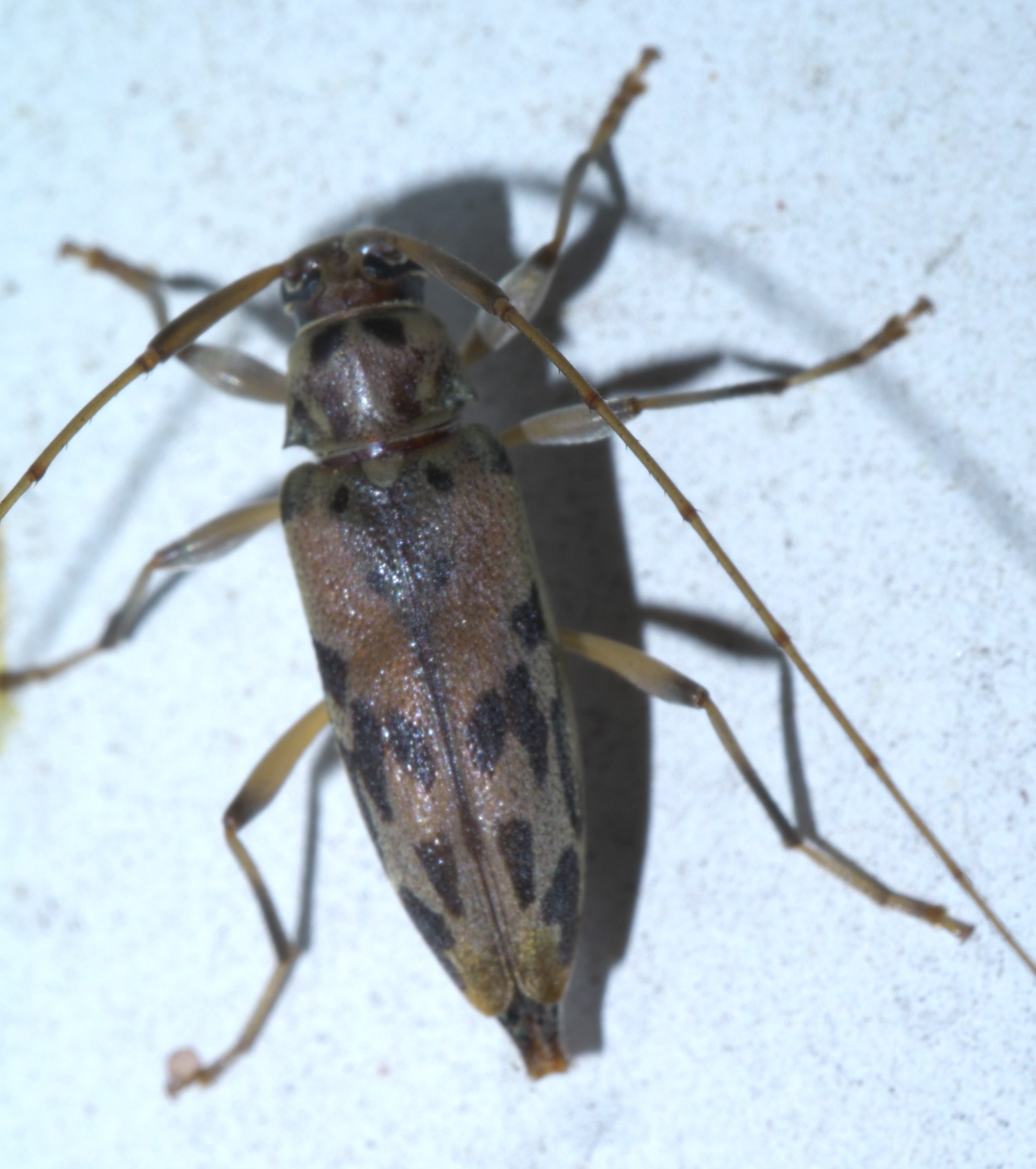
- Lepturges pictus.jpg

Scientific classification
- Domain: Eukaryota
- Kingdom: Animalia
- Phylum: Arthropoda
- Class: Insecta
- Order: Coleoptera
- Suborder: Polyphaga
- Infraorder: Cucujiformia
- Family: Cerambycidae
- Genus: Lepturges
- Species: L. pictus

Binomial name
- Lepturges pictus (LeConte, 1852)

= Lepturges pictus =

Species of beetle

Lepturges pictus is a species of longhorn beetle of the subfamily Lamiinae. It was described by John Lawrence LeConte in 1852.
