= Lepturges alboscriptus =

Scientific classification
- Domain: Eukaryota
- Kingdom: Animalia
- Phylum: Arthropoda
- Class: Insecta
- Order: Coleoptera
- Suborder: Polyphaga
- Infraorder: Cucujiformia
- Family: Cerambycidae
- Genus: Lepturges
- Species: L. alboscriptus

Binomial name
- Lepturges alboscriptus Bates, 1863

Species of beetle

Lepturges alboscriptus is a species of beetle in the family Cerambycidae. It was described by Henry Walter Bates in 1863.
