= Lepturges megalops =

Scientific classification
- Domain: Eukaryota
- Kingdom: Animalia
- Phylum: Arthropoda
- Class: Insecta
- Order: Coleoptera
- Suborder: Polyphaga
- Infraorder: Cucujiformia
- Family: Cerambycidae
- Genus: Lepturges
- Species: L. megalops

Binomial name
- Lepturges megalops Hamilton in Leng & Hamilton, 1896

Species of beetle

Lepturges megalops is a species of longhorn beetle of the subfamily Lamiinae. It was described by Hamilton in 1896. It is a widespread neotropical species that can be found in Florida, the Bahamas, Guatemala, Honduras, and Panama.

The species is distinctive by its black integument and large eyes. It is typically 5–8 mm long.
